= Egyptian Revival architecture =

Architectural style

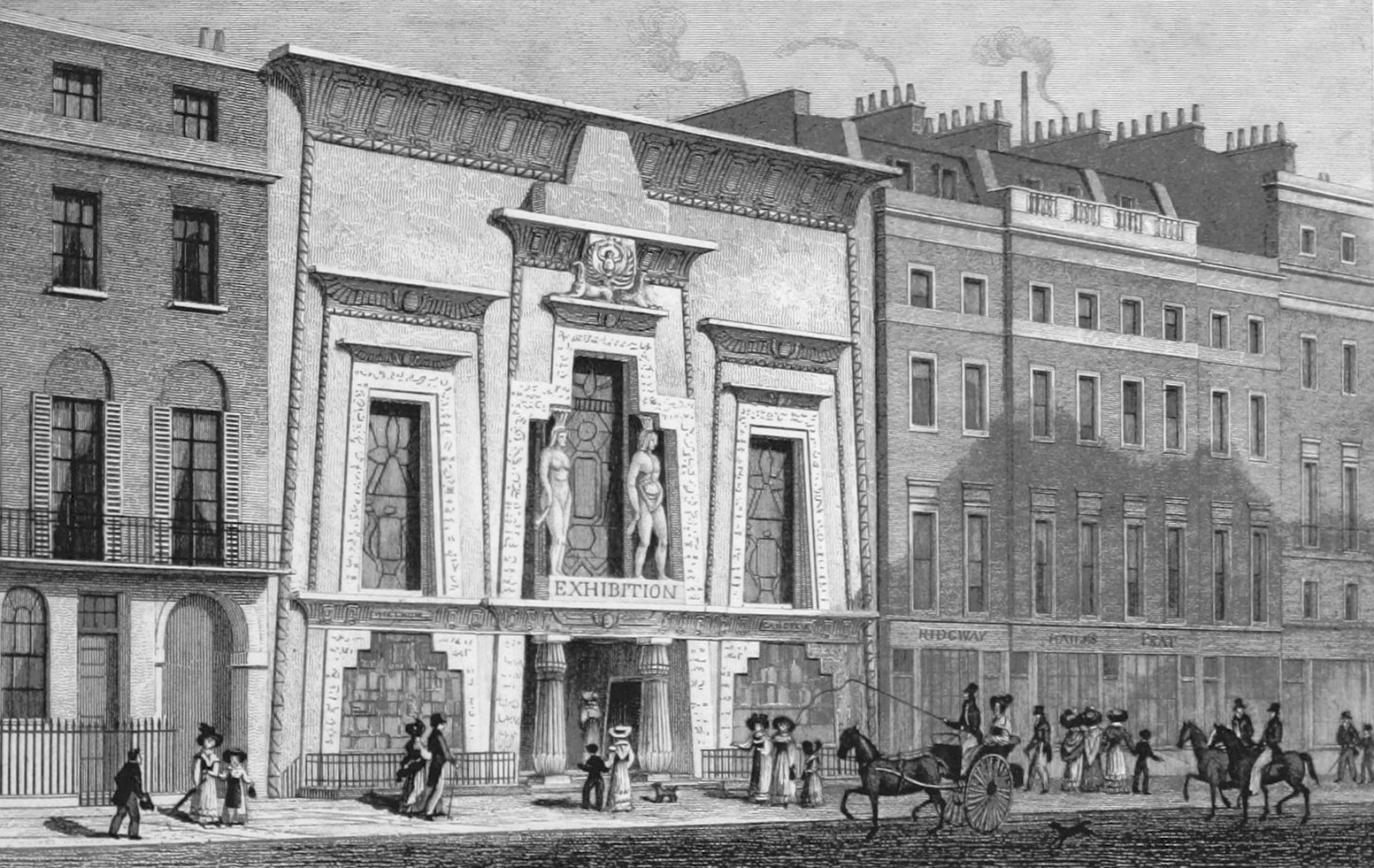
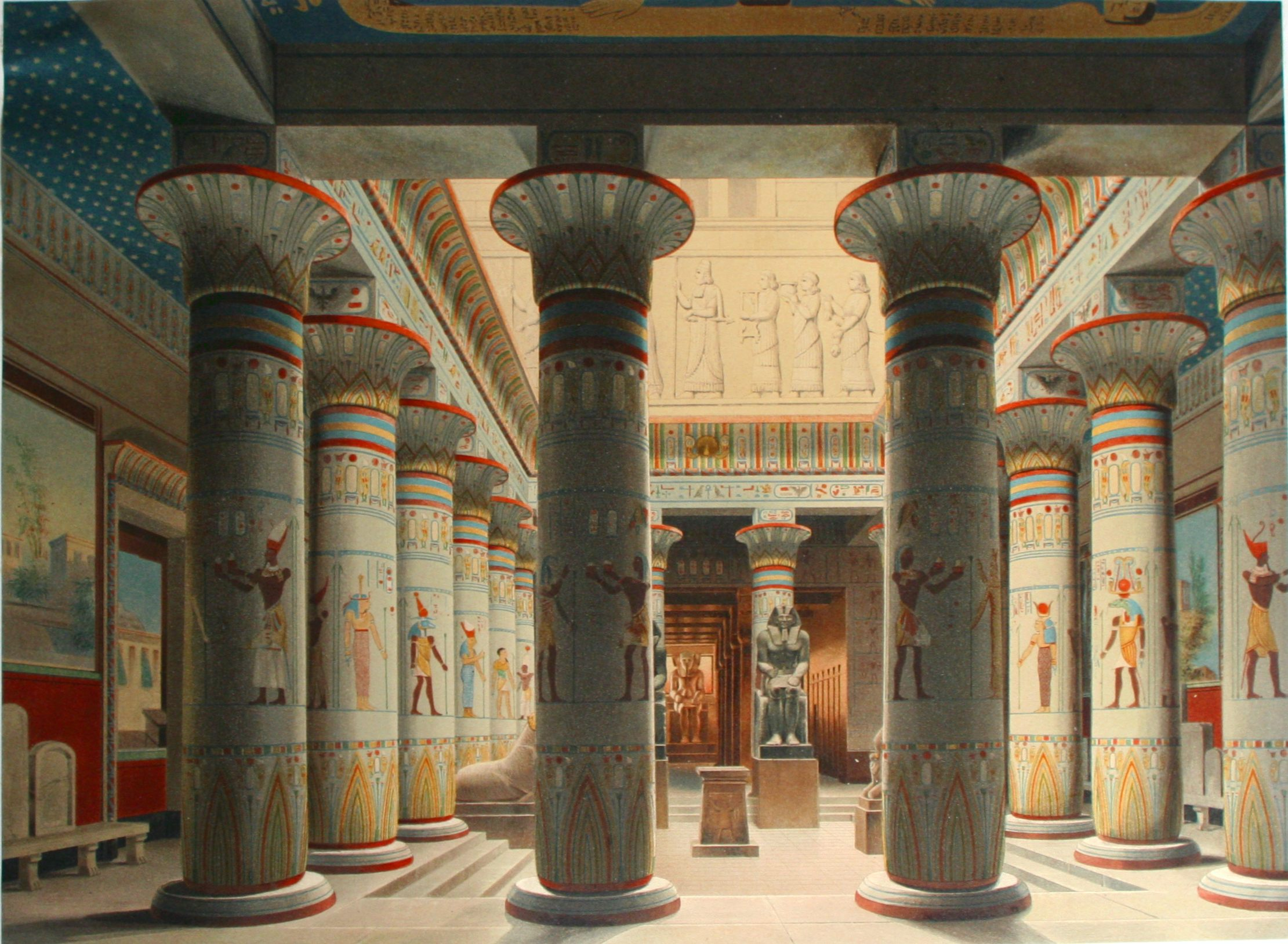
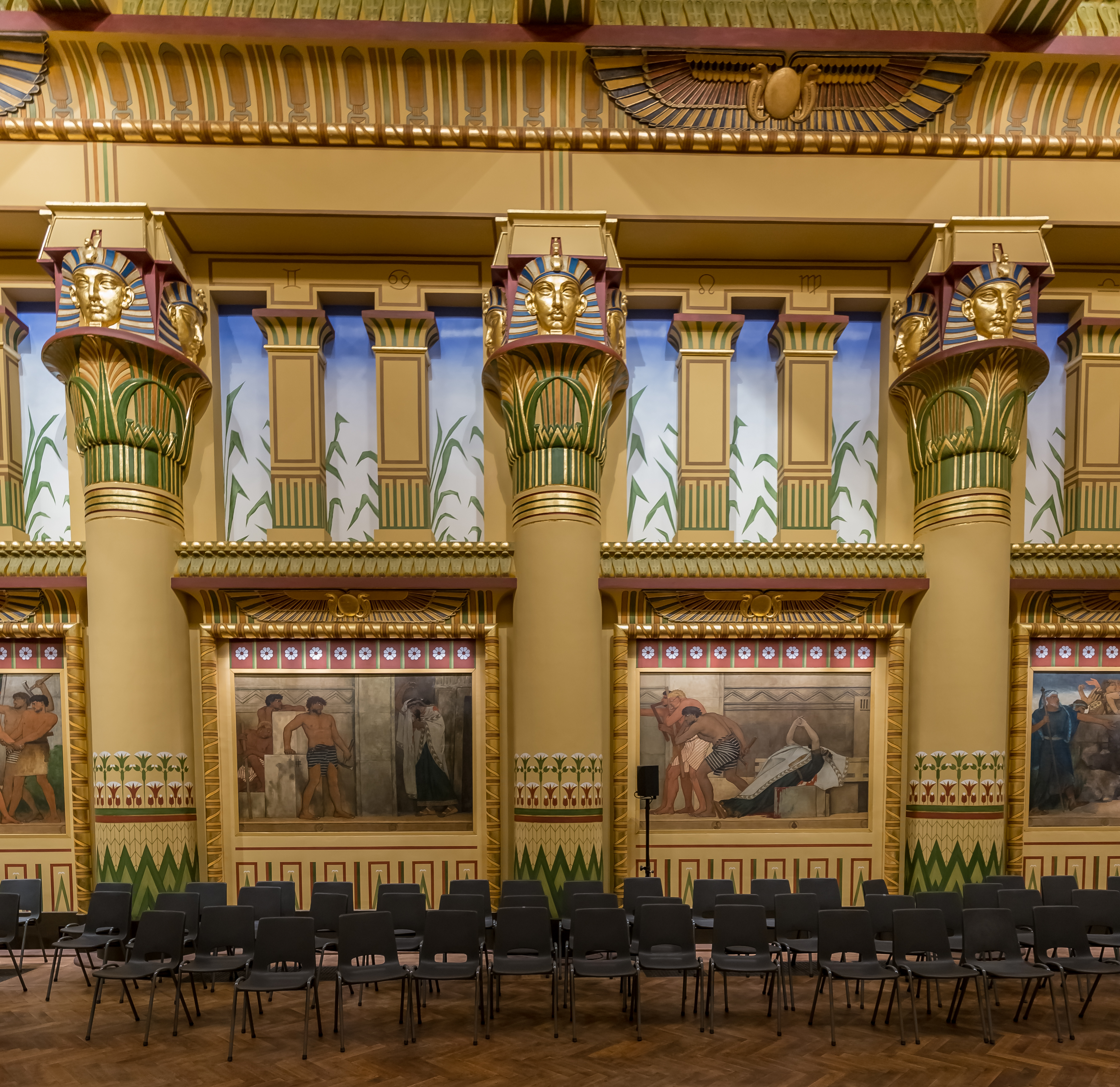
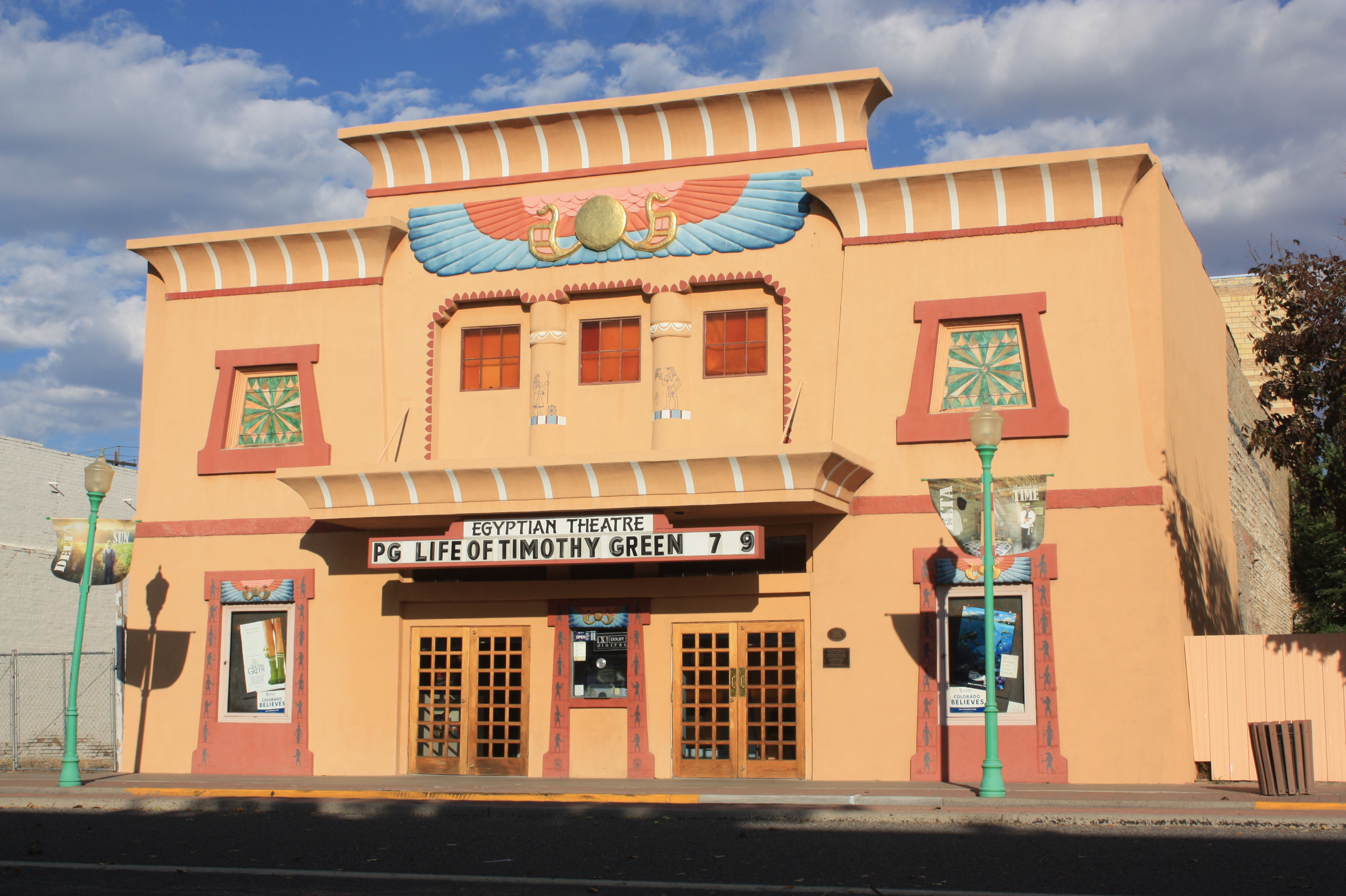
- A: The Egyptian Hall in London (1812 destroyed in 1905); B: 1862 lithograph of the Aegyptischer Hof (English: Egyptian court), from the Neues Museum, Berlin (early of mid-19th century); C: Interior of the Temple maçonnique des Amis philanthropes in Brussels, Belgium (1877–1879); D: Egyptian Theatre, Colorado, U.S. (1928)
- Years active: Late 18th–present
- Location: Western world

Egyptian Revival is an architectural style that uses the motifs and imagery of ancient Egypt. It is attributed generally to the public awareness of ancient Egyptian monuments generated by Napoleon's invasion of Egypt in 1798, and Admiral Nelson's defeat of the French Navy at the Battle of the Nile later that year. Napoleon took a scientific expedition with him to Egypt. Publication of the expedition's work, the Description de l'Égypte, began in 1809 and was published as a series through 1826. The size and monumentality of the façades discovered during his adventure cemented the hold of Egyptian aesthetics on the Parisian elite. However, works of art and architecture (such as funerary monuments) in the Egyptian style had been made or built occasionally on the European continent since the time of the Renaissance.

== History ==
=== Egyptian influence before Napoleon ===
Much of the early knowledge about ancient Egyptian arts and architecture was filtered through the lens of the Classical world, including ancient Rome. Prior to Napoleon's influence an early example is the Obelisk of Domitian, erected in 1651 by Bernini on top of the Fontana dei Quattro Fiumi in Piazza Navona, Rome, which went on to inspire several Egyptian obelisks constructed in Ireland during the early 18th century. It influenced the Stillorgan Obelisk constructed as a family funeral memorial by Sir Edward Lovett Pearce for the Allen family at Stillorgan in Ireland in 1717, one of several Egyptian obelisks erected in Ireland during the early 18th century. Others may be found at Belan, County Kildare; and Dangan, County Meath. Conolly's Folly in County Kildare is probably the best known, albeit the least Egyptian-styled.

Egyptian buildings had also been built as garden follies. The most elaborate was probably the one built by Duke Frederick I of Württemberg in the gardens of the Château de Montbéliard. It included an Egyptian bridge across which guests walked to reach an island with an elaborate Egyptian-influenced bath house. Designed by Jean-Baptiste Kléber, later French commander in Egypt, the building had a billiards room and a bagnio.

During the 2nd half of the 18th century, with the rise of Neoclassicism, sometimes architects mixed the Ancient Greek, Roman and Egyptian styles. They wanted to discover new shape and ornament ideas, rather than to be just faithful copyists of the past.

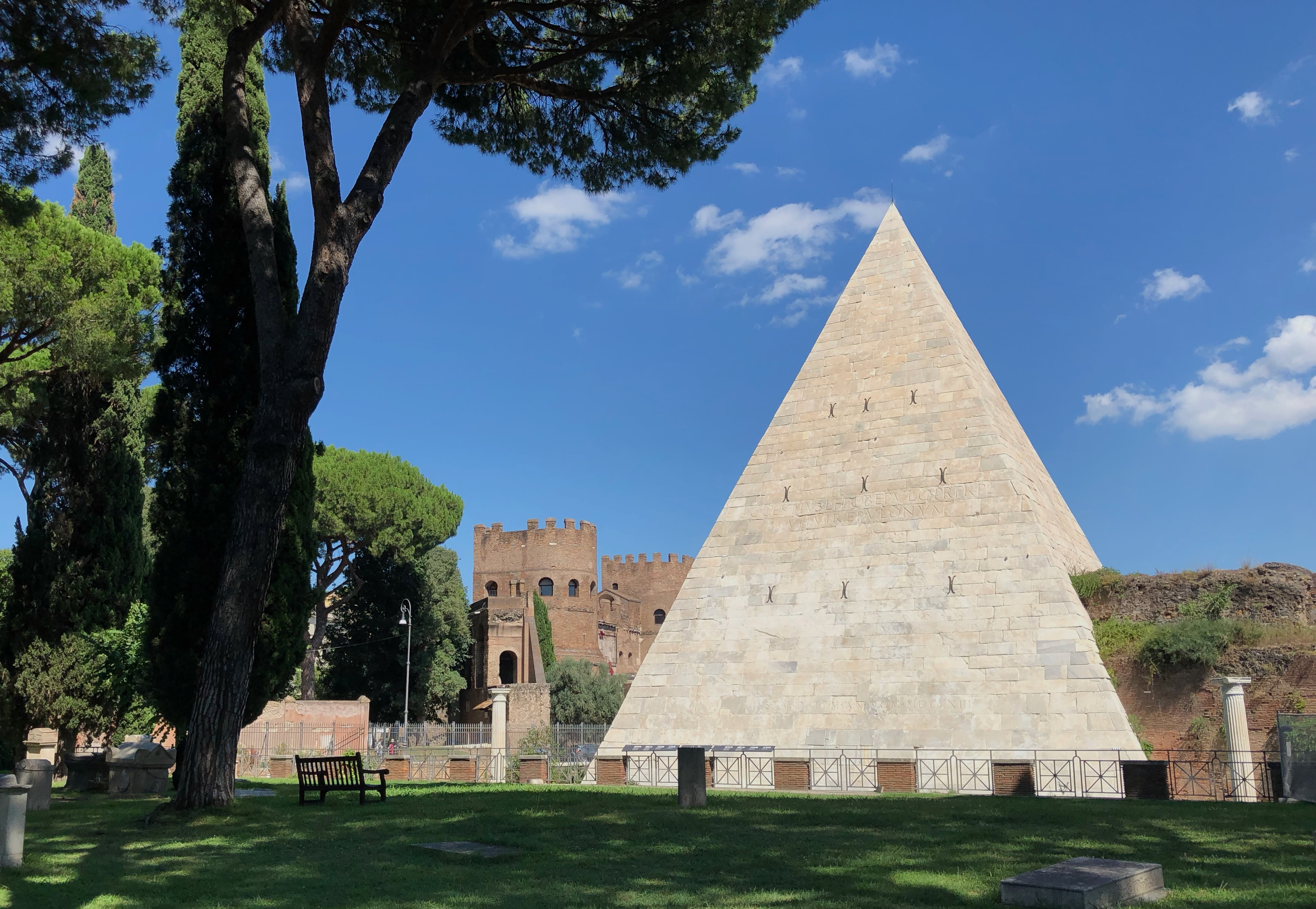
Pyramid of Cestius, Rome, by Gaius Cestius, c.12 BC

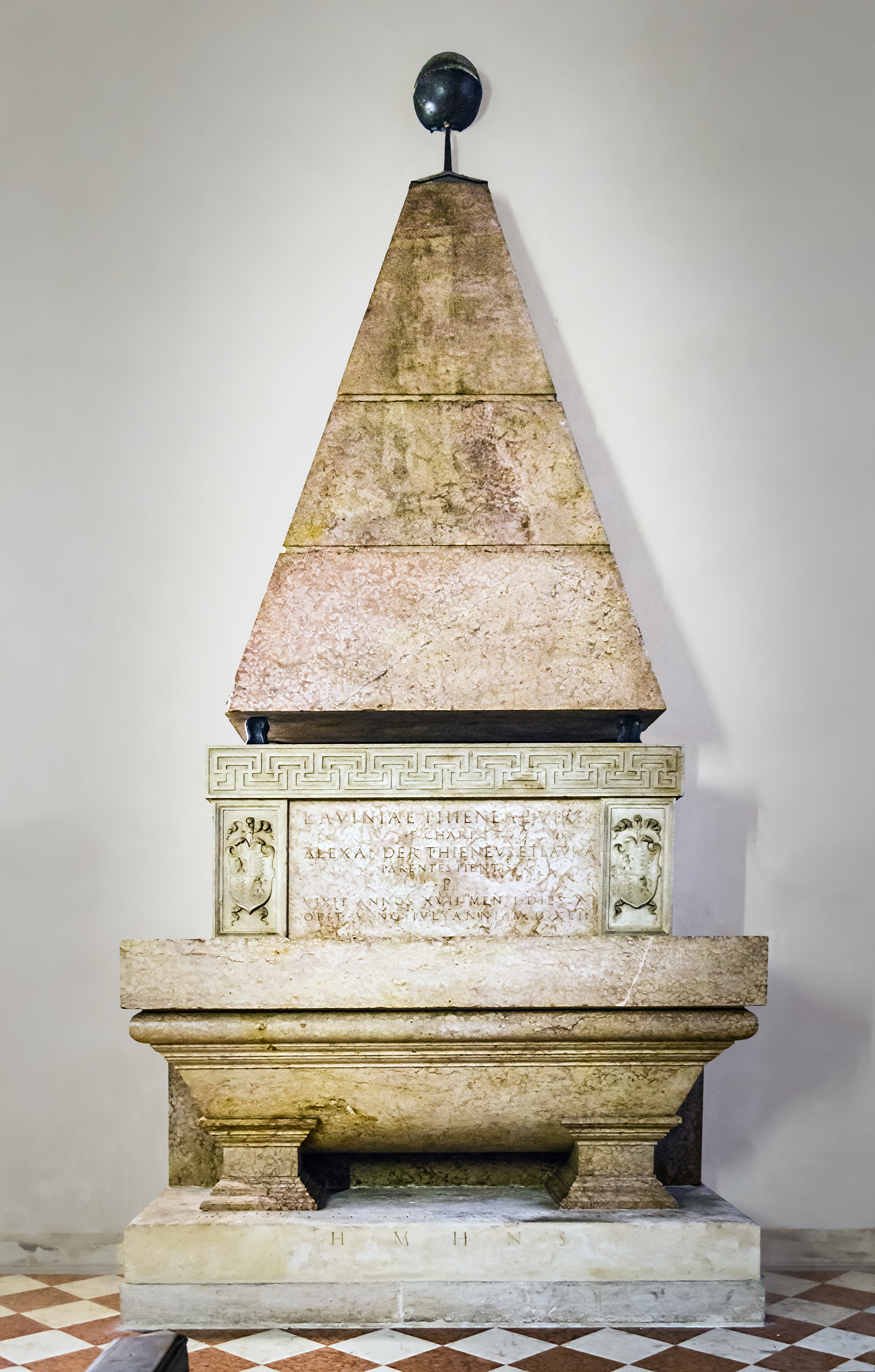
Renaissance monument to Lavinia Thiene, with an Egyptian-inspired pyramid on it, Vicenza Cathedral, Vicenza, Italy, by Giulio Romano, 1544

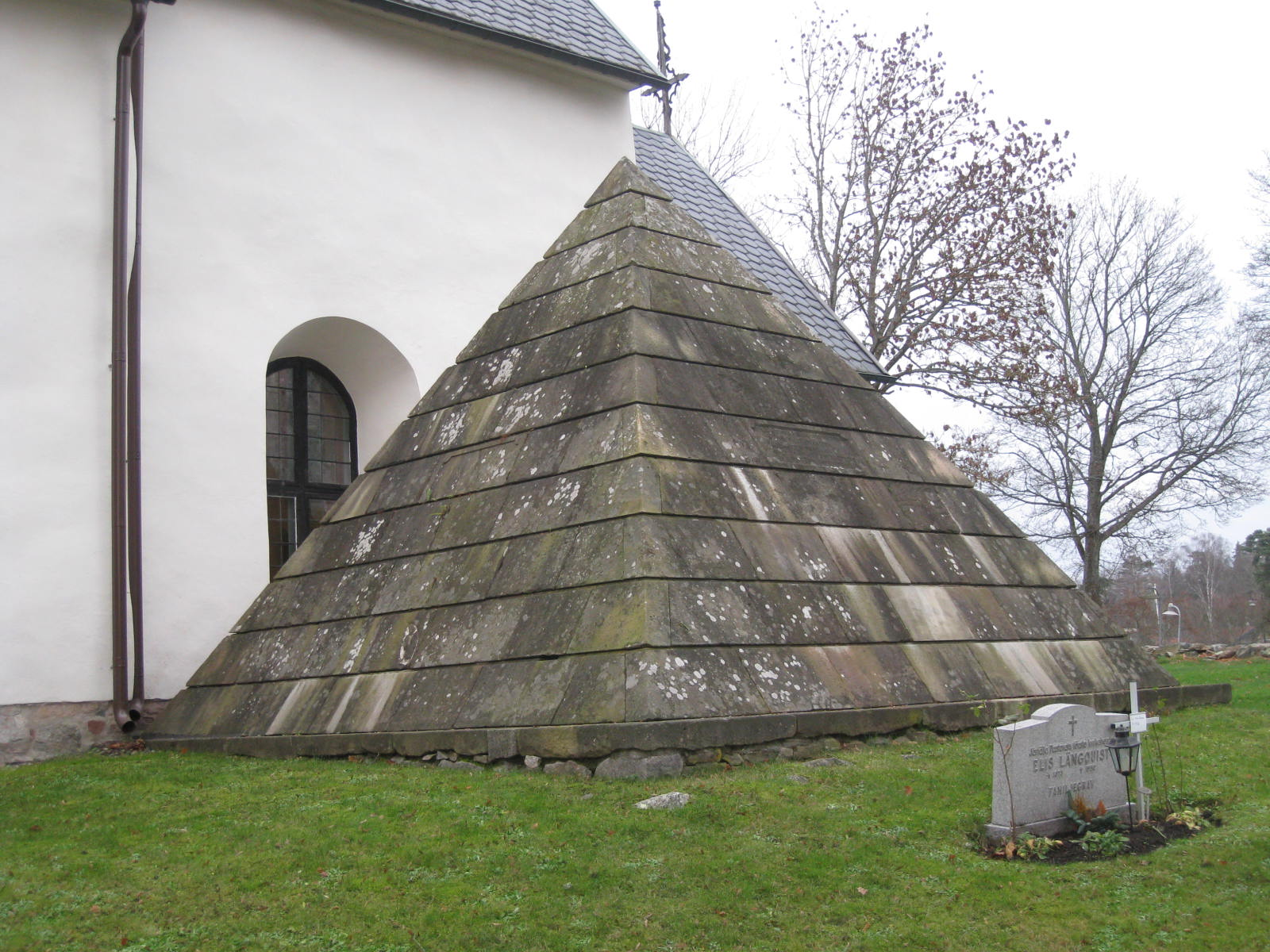
Pyramid grave, churchyard in Järfälla, Sweden, unknown architect, 18th century

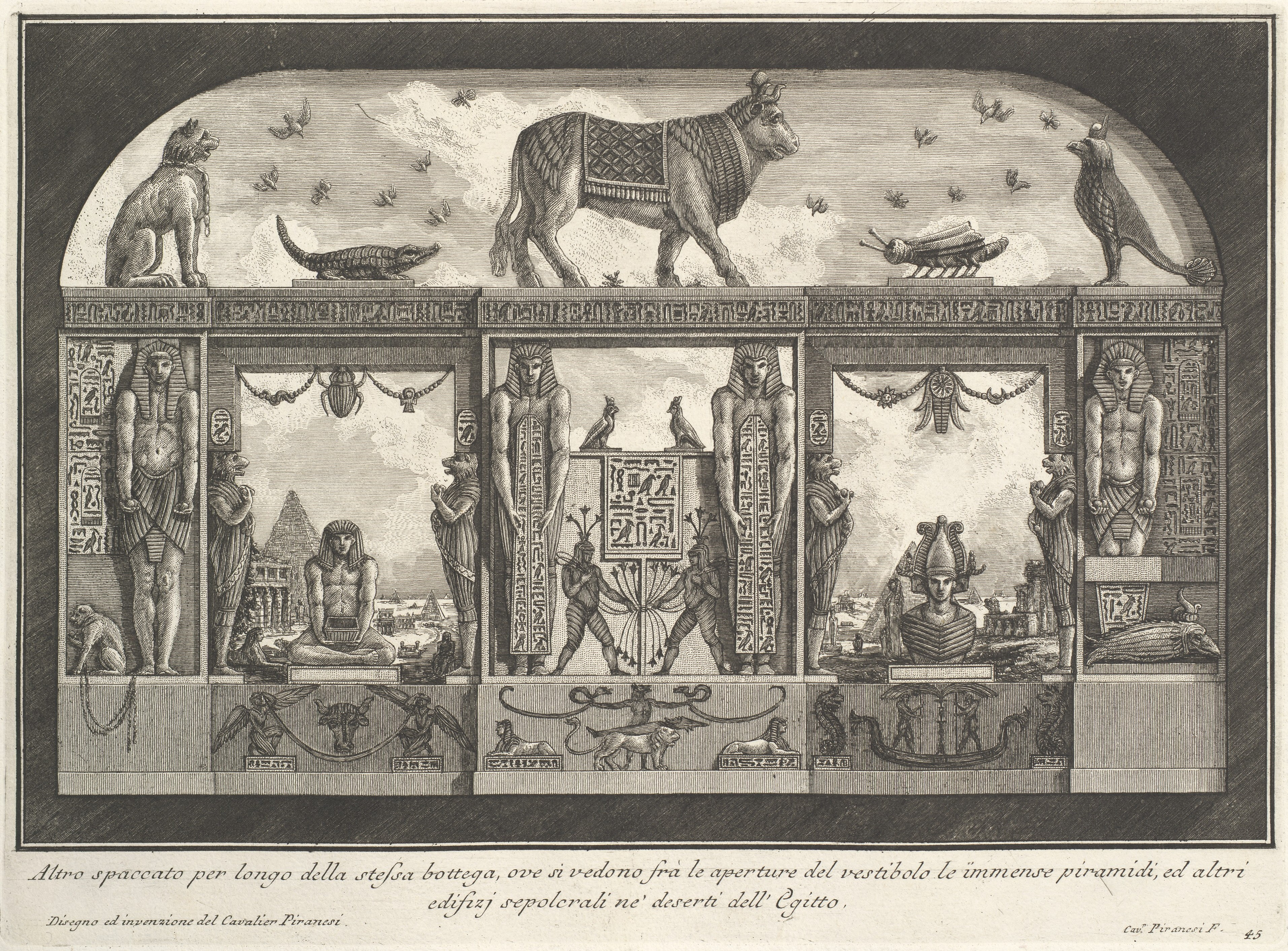
Mural Decoration for the Caffè degli Inglesi, Piazza di Spagna, Rome, Metropolitan Museum of Art, New York City, by Giovanni Battista Piranesi, 1769

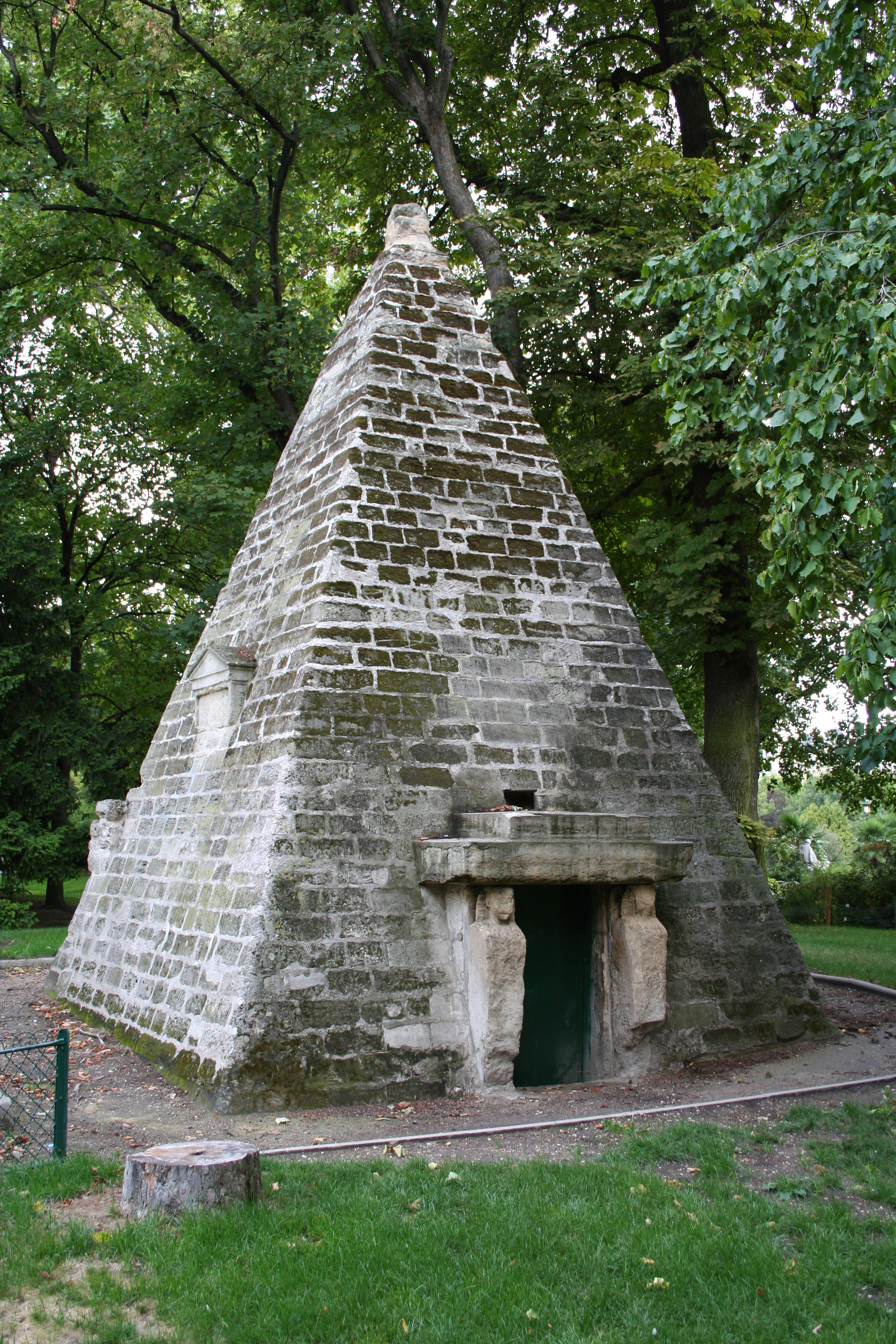
Pyramid in the gardens of Parc Monceau, Paris, unknown architect, 1778

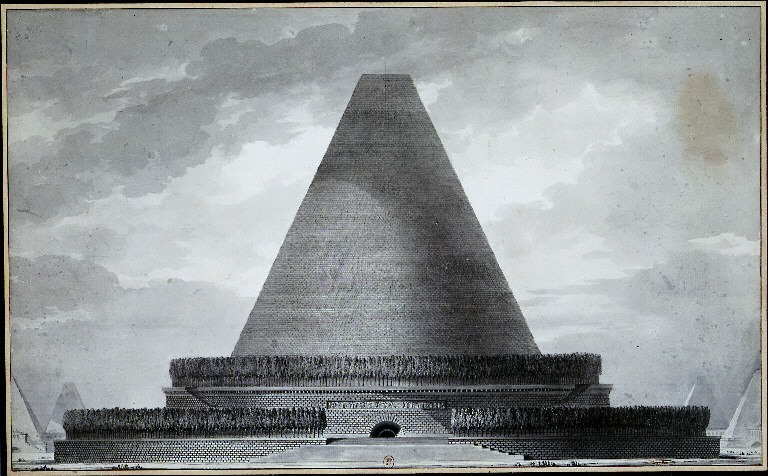
Cenotaph in Egyptian Style, Bibliothèque Nationale de France, Paris, by Étienne-Louis Boullée, c.1786

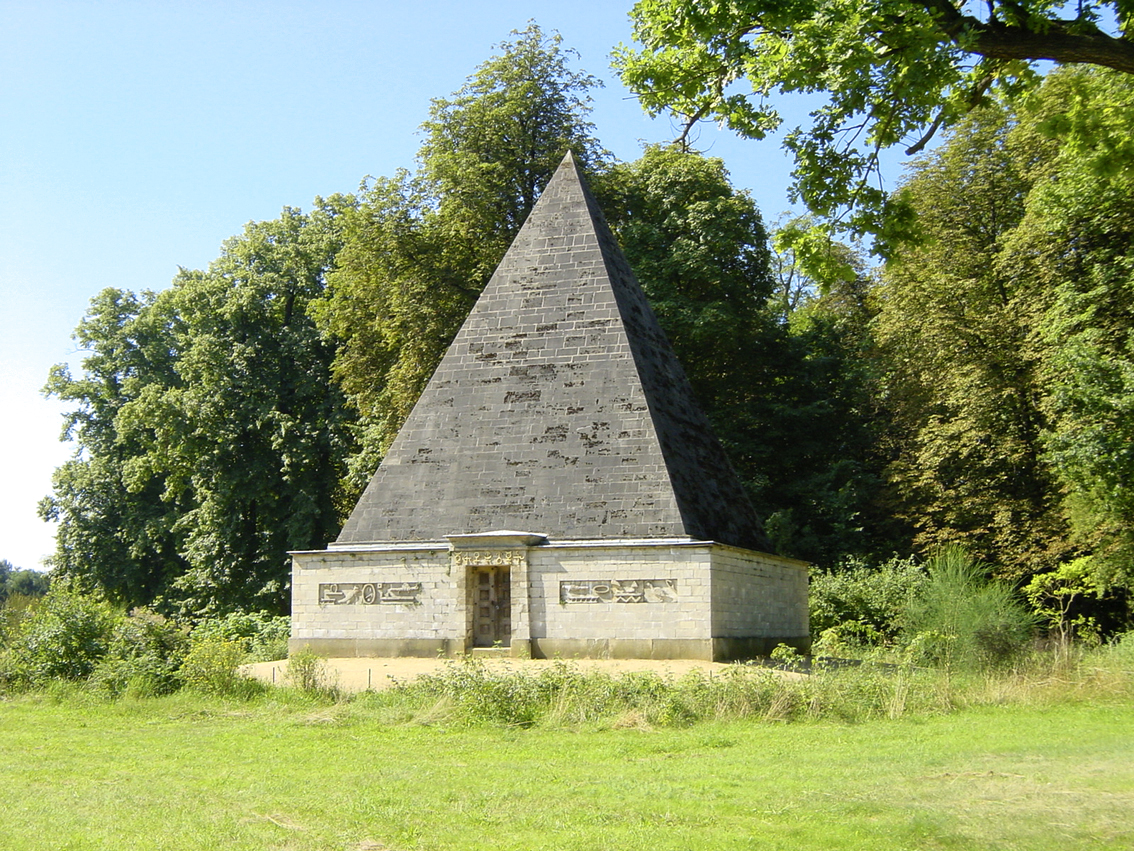
Pyramid used as a cold store, New Garden, Potsdam, Germany, by Andreas Ludwig Krüger, 1791–1792

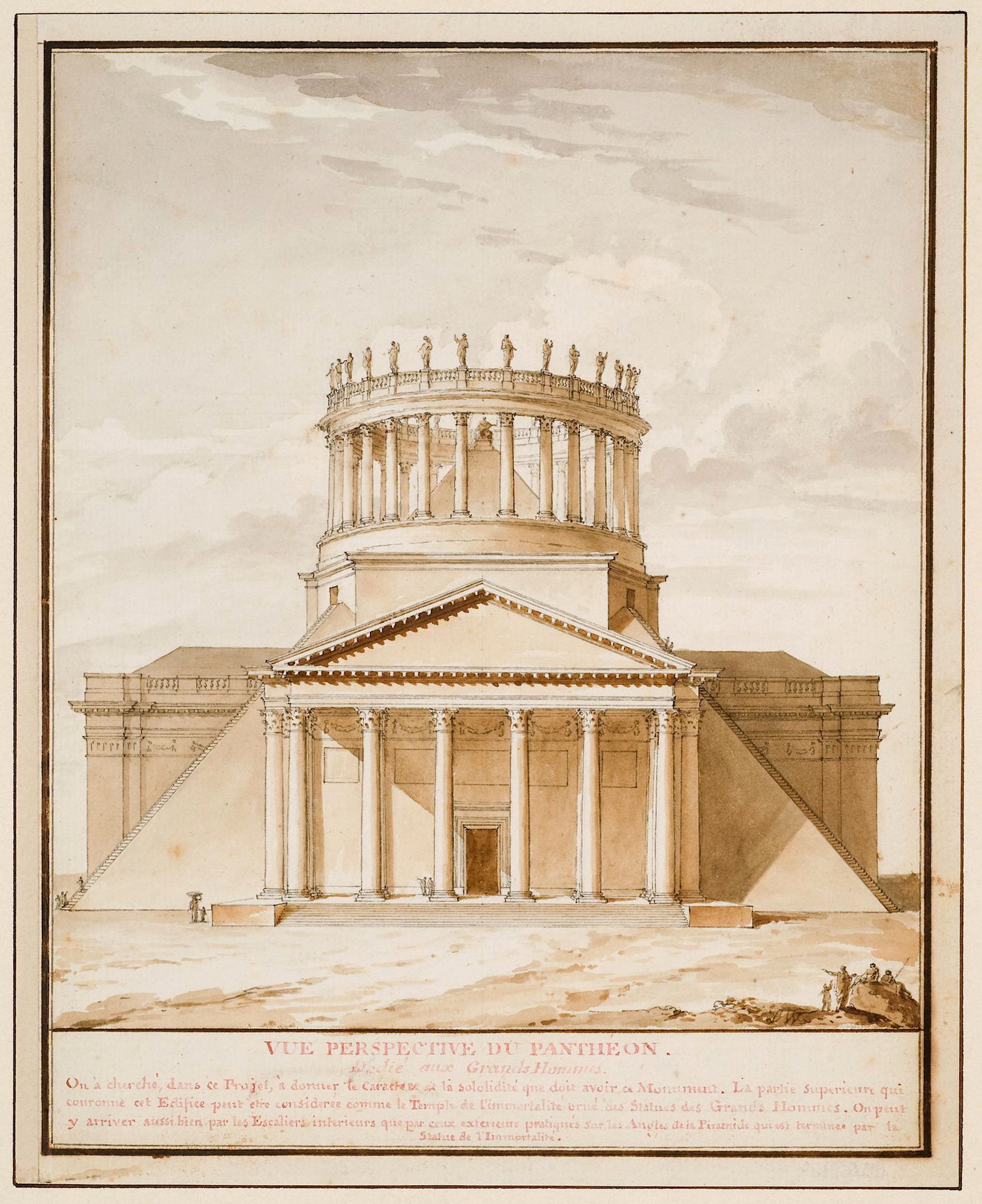
Project to transform the Panthéon, by Charles de Wailly, 1797

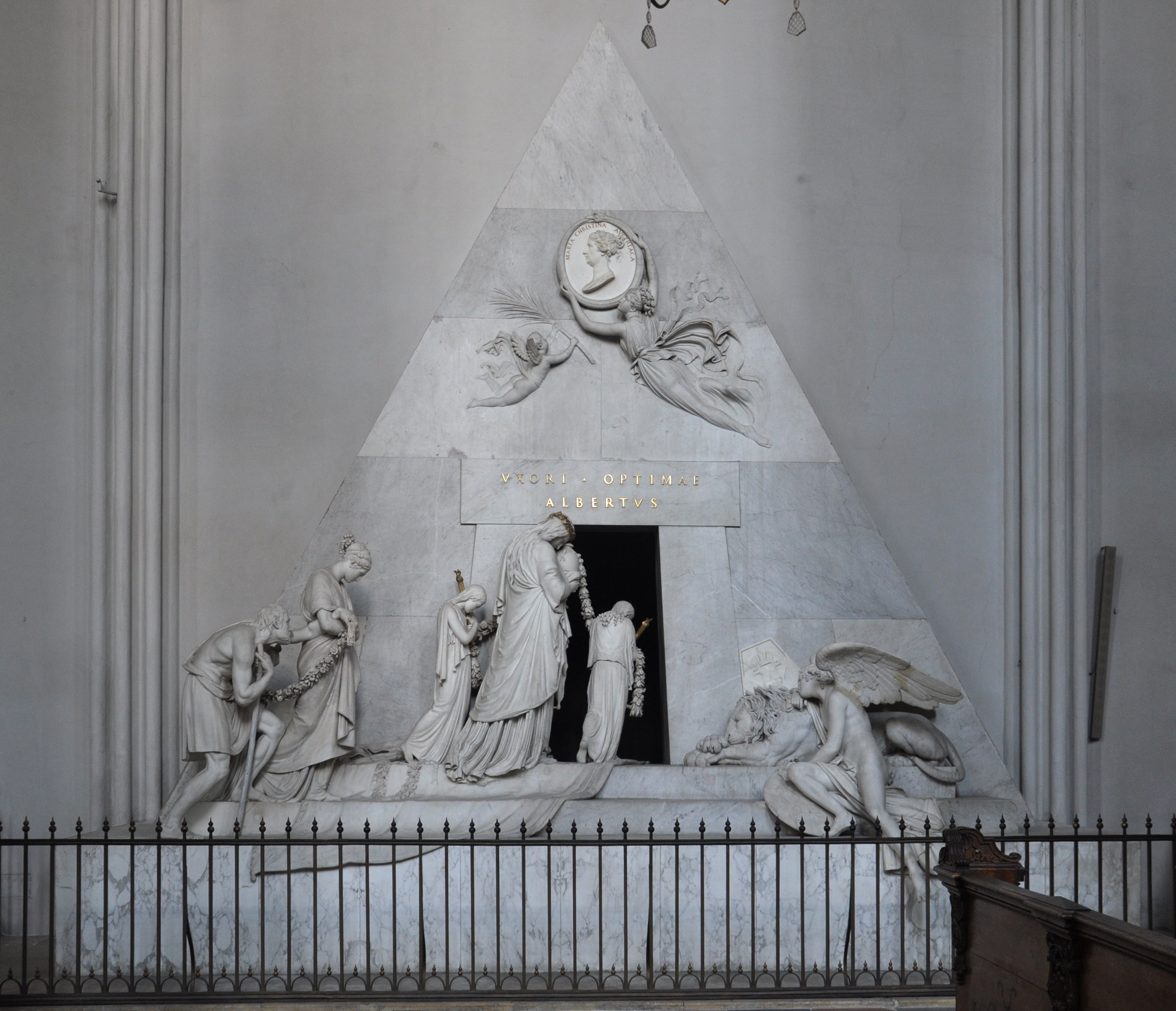
Cenotaph of Archduchess Maria Christina, Duchess of Teschen, Augustinian Church, Vienna, Austria, by Antonio Canova, 1798–1805

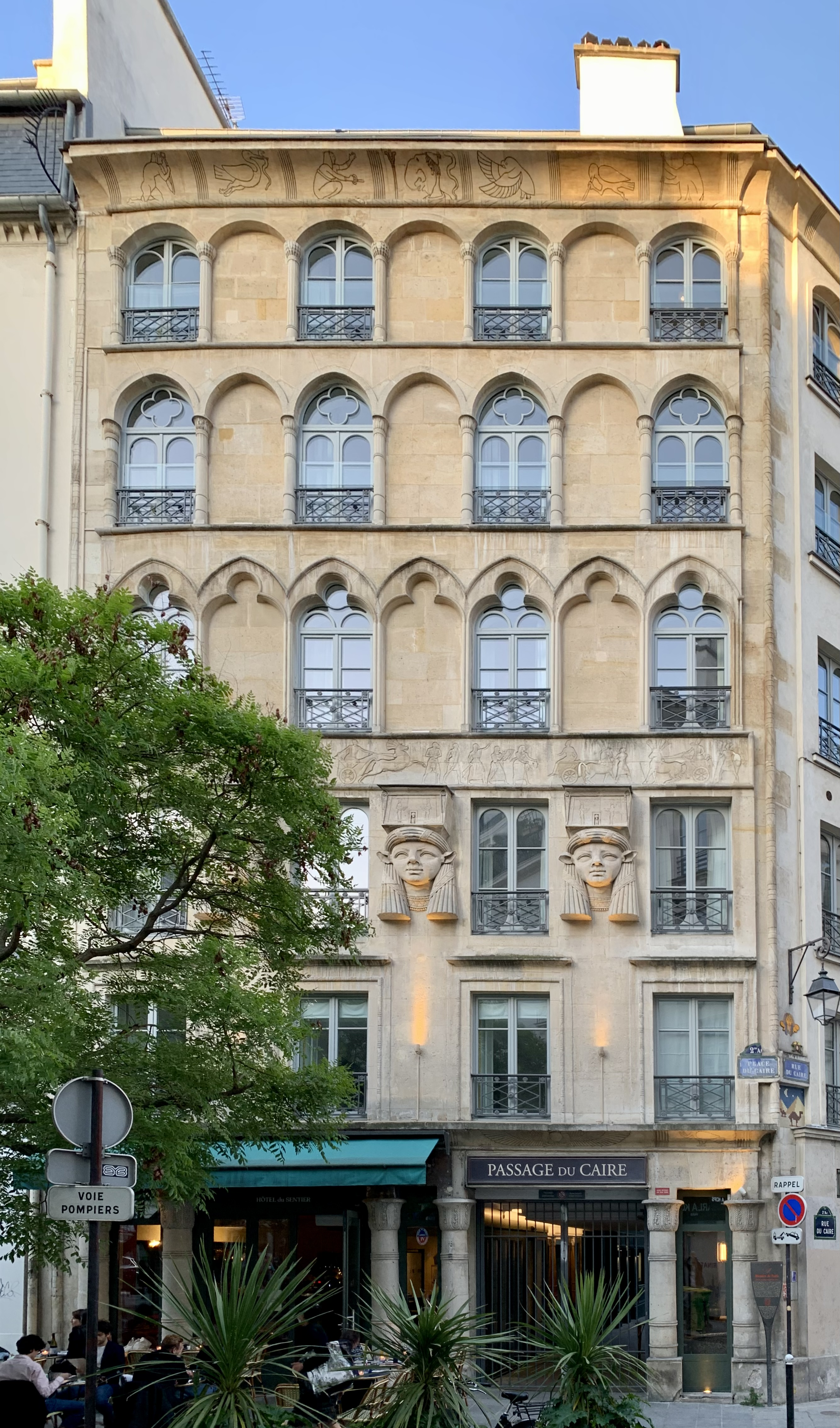
Passage du Caire (Place du Caire No. 2), Paris, by Philippe-Laurent Prétrel 1798

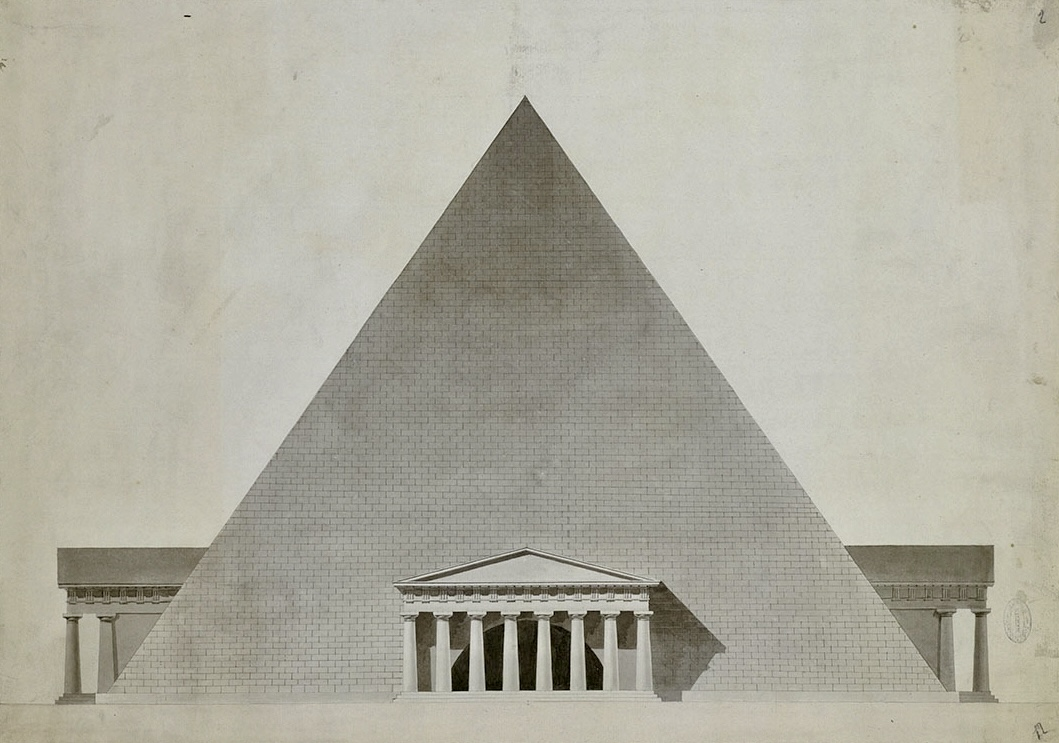
Design for the Elysium, by Louis-Sylvestre Gasse, 1799

=== Napoleonic and Post-Napoleonic eras ===
After the Napoleonic invasion, there was a sudden increase in the number of works of art, and for the first time, entire buildings began to be built to resemble those of ancient Egypt. In France and Britain, this was at least partially inspired by the successful war campaigns each country conducted in Egypt.

For Napoleon's intention of cataloguing the sights and findings from the campaign, hundreds of artists and scientists were enlisted to document "antiquities, ethnography, architecture, and natural history of Egypt"; and later these notes and sketches were taken back to Europe. In 1803, the compilation of "Description de l'Égypte" was started based on these documents and lasted over twenty years. The content of this archaeological text includes translations of the Rosetta Stone, the pyramids, and other scenes, arousing interest in Egyptian arts and culture in Europe and America.

According to James Stevens Curl, people started to present their imaginations about Egypt in various ways. First, combinations of crocodiles, pyramids, mummies, sphinxes, and other motifs were widely circulated. In 1800, an Egyptian opera festival was staged in Drury Lane, London, with Egyptian-themed sets and costumes. On the other hand, William Capon (1757–1827) suggested a massive pyramid for Shooter's Hill as a National Monument, while George Smith (1783–1869) designed an Egyptian-style tomb for Ralph Abercromby in Alexandria.

According to David Brownlee, the 1798 Karlsruhe Synagogue, an early building by the influential Friedrich Weinbrenner was "the first large Egyptian building to be erected since antiquity." According to Diana Muir, it was "the first public building (that is, not a folly, stage set, or funeral monument) in the Egyptian revival style." The ancient Egyptian influence was mainly shown in the two large engaged pylons flanking the entrance; otherwise, the windows and entrance of the central section were pointed arches, and the overall plan was conventional, with Neo-Gothic details.

Among the earliest monuments of the Egyptian Revival in Paris is the Fontaine du Fellah, built in 1806. It was designed by François-Jean Bralle. A well-documented example, destroyed after Napoleon's deposition, was the monument to General Louis Desaix in the Place des Victoires, built in 1810. It featured a nude statue of the general and an obelisk, both set upon an Egyptian Revival base. Another example of a still-standing site of Egyptian Revival is the Egyptian Gate of Tsarskoe Selo, built in 1829.

A street or passage named the Place du Caire or Foire du Caire (Fair of Cairo) was built in Paris in 1798 on the former site of the convent of the "Filles de la Charité". No. 2 Place du Caire, from 1828, is essentially in overall form a conventional Parisian structure with shops on the ground floor and apartments above, but with considerable Egyptianizing decoration including a row of massive Hathor heads and a frieze by sculptor J. G. Garraud.

One of the first British buildings to show an Egyptian Revival interior was the newspaper office of the Courier on the Strand, London. It was built in 1804 and featured a cavetto (coved) cornice and Egyptian-influenced columns with palmiform capitals. Other early British examples include the Egyptian Hall in London, completed in 1812, and the Egyptian Dining Room at Goodwood House (1806). There was also the Egyptian Gallery, a private room in the home of connoisseur Thomas Hope to display his Egyptian antiquities, and illustrated in engravings from his meticulous line drawings in his book Household Furniture (1807), were a prime source for the Regency style of British furnishings.

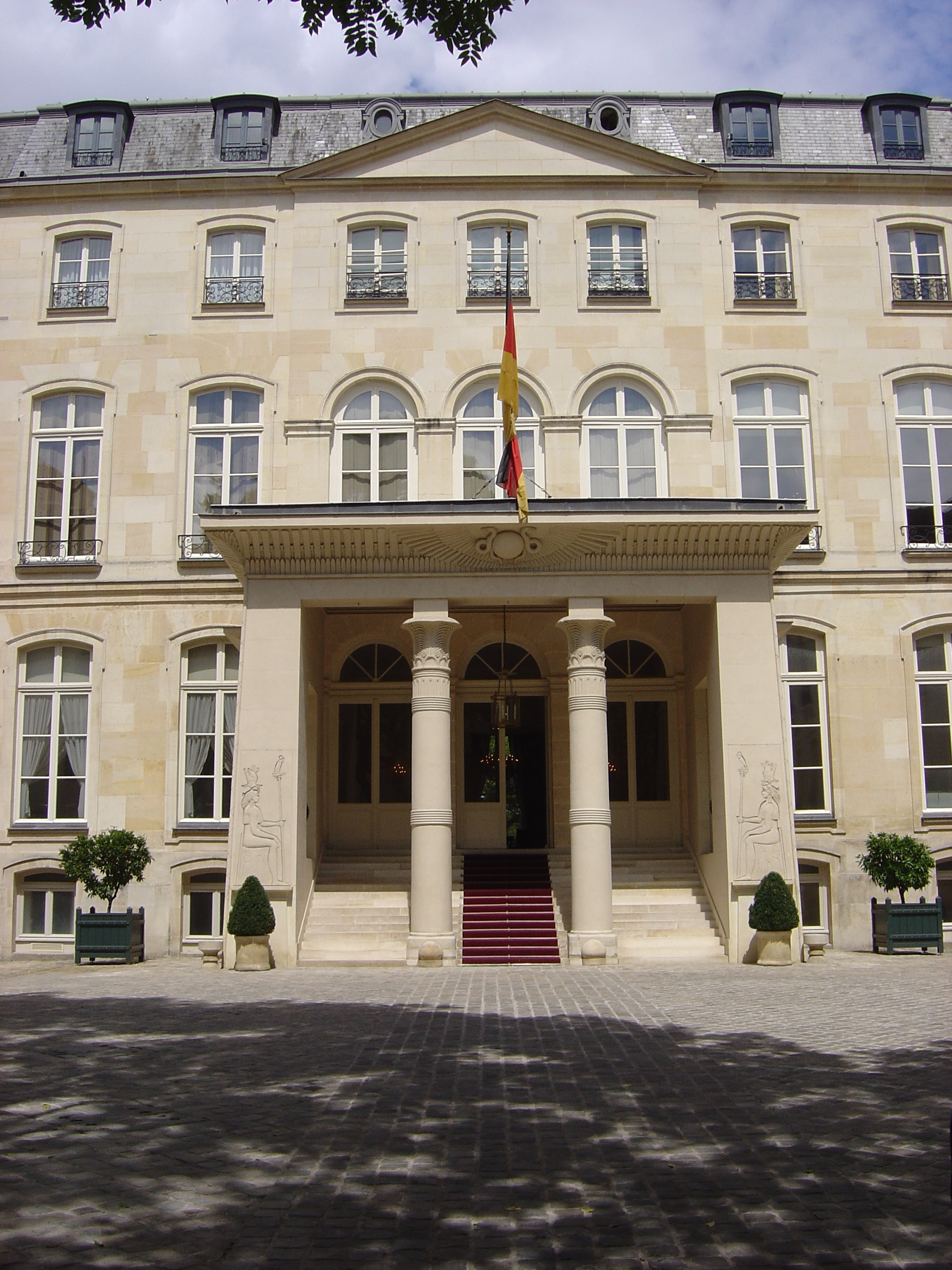
Portico of the Hôtel Beauharnais, Paris, by L.E.N. Bataille, c.1804

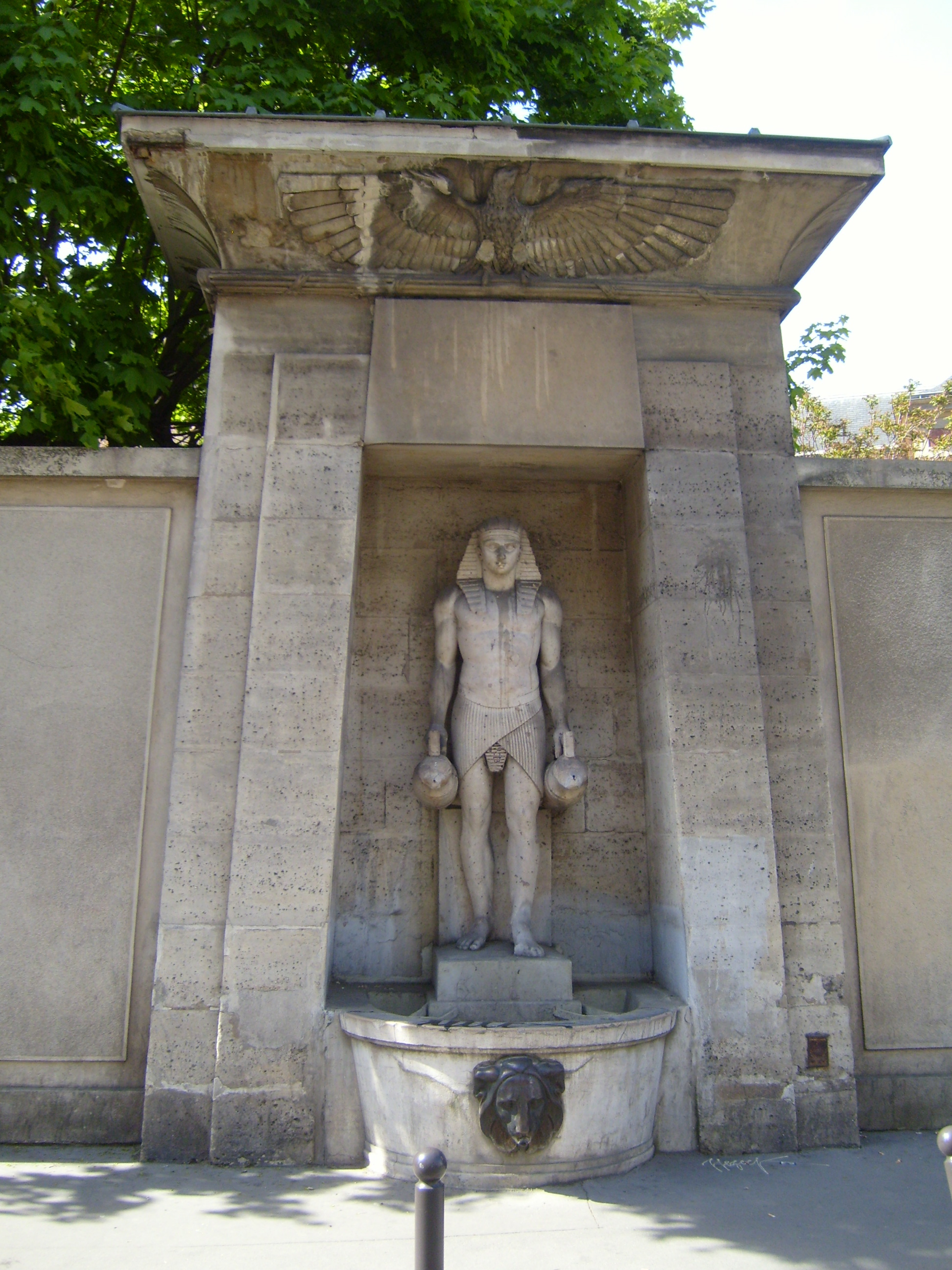
Fontaine du Fellah, Paris, by François-Jean Bralle, 1806

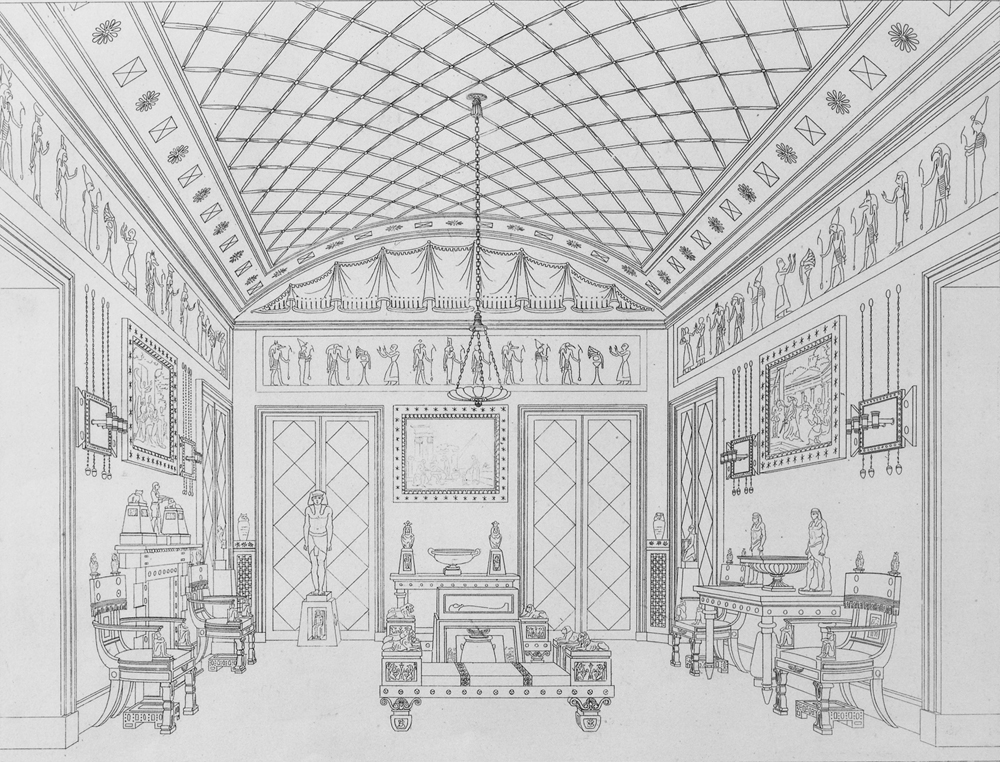
Egyptian room design, unknown location, by Thomas Hope, 1807

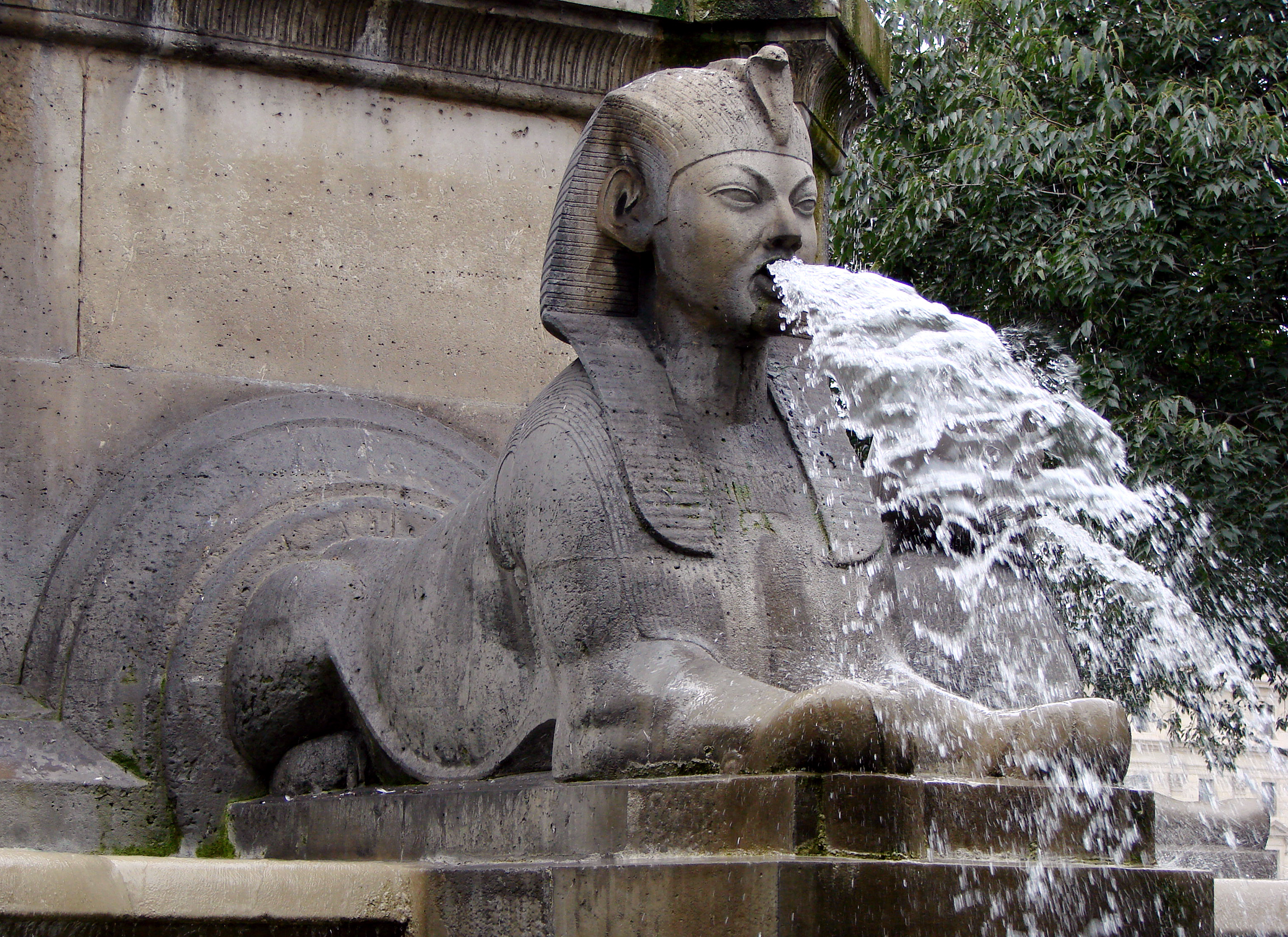
Sphinx of the Fontaine du Palmier, Paris, unknown sculptor, 1808 and 1858

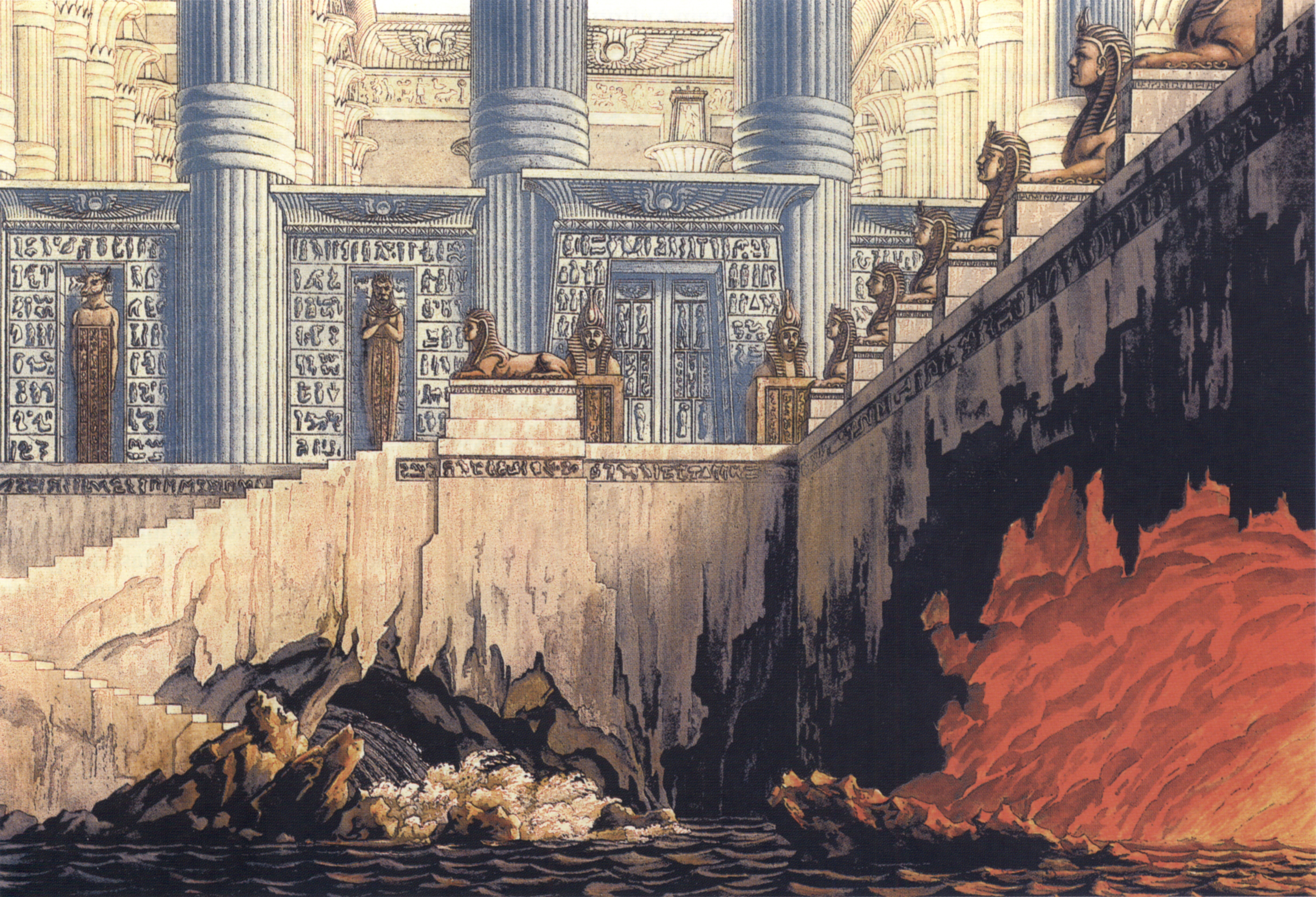
Design for an Egyptian set for Act II of The Magic Flute, by Karl Friedrich Schinkel, 1815, watercolour on paper, Bibliothèque de l'Opéra National, Paris

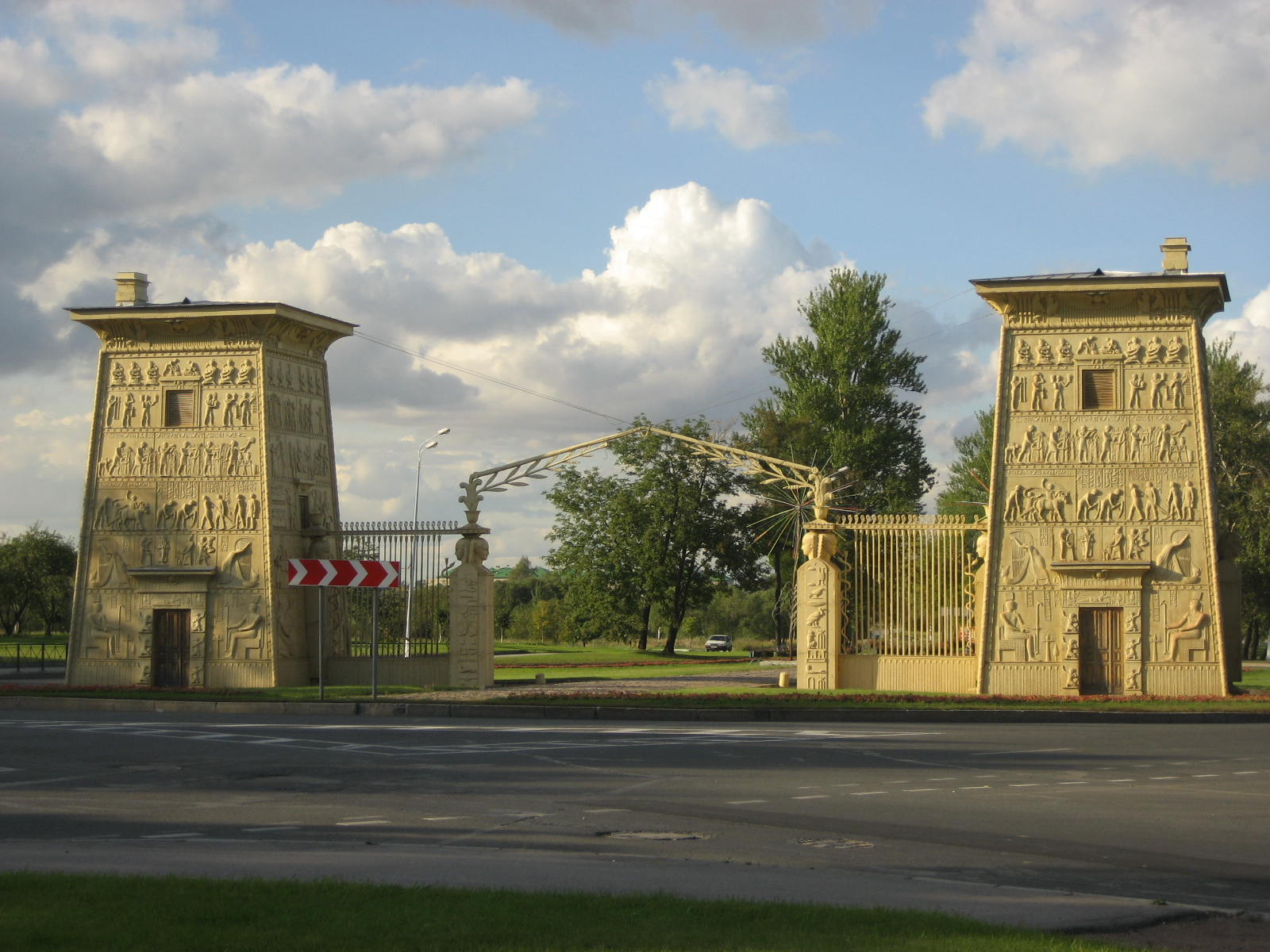
Egyptian Gate of Tsarskoye Selo, Saint Petersburg, Russia, unknown architect, 1829

=== Rise of Egyptian Revival in America ===
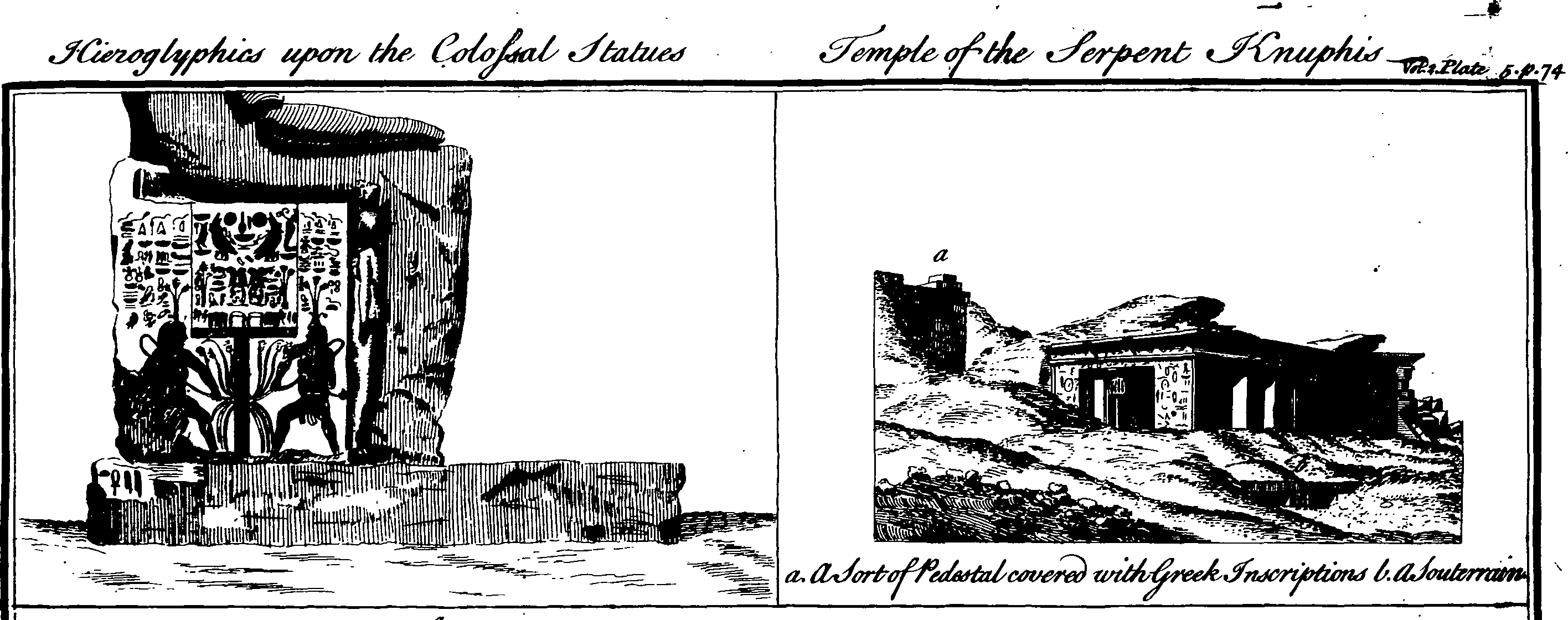
Travels in Egypt and Nubia, Fredrick Norden, 1757

The first Egyptian Revival building in the United States was the 1824 synagogue of Congregation Mikveh Israel in Philadelphia. It was followed by a series of major public buildings in the first half of the 19th century including the 1835 Moyamensing Prison, Philadelphia, Pennsylvania, United States, the 1836 Fourth District Police Station in New Orleans and the 1838 New York City jail known as the Tombs. Other public buildings in Egyptian style included the 1844 Old Whaler's Church in Sag Harbor, New York, the 1846 First Baptist Church of Essex, Connecticut, the 1845 Egyptian Building of the Medical College of Virginia in Richmond and the 1848 United States Custom House (New Orleans). The most notable Egyptian structure in the United States was the Washington Monument, begun in 1848, this obelisk originally featured doors with cavetto cornices and winged sun disks, later removed. The National World War I Museum and Memorial in Kansas City, Missouri, is another example of Egyptian revival architecture and art.

Around the 1870s, Americans began to show an increasing interest in other cultures, including those of Japan, the Middle East, and North Africa, which led to a second period of interest in the Egyptian Revival. Egyptian motifs and symbols were commonly used in the design including elements of "gilt bronze fittings shaped like sphinxes, Egyptian scenes woven into textiles, and geometric renderings of plants such as palm fronds".

Some Americans in the 1880s believed that the United States was a nation without art and therefore wanted to innovate in the field of aesthetic design to distinguish it from Egyptian pyramids and obelisks, Greek temples, and Gothic spires. But implementing such innovations was difficult, and as Clarence King said, "Till there is an American race there cannot be an American style". The creation of the American style was also hindered by the fact that the ethnic mix of the American people did not constitute a race. In the time that followed, however, America's own culture was assimilating Egyptian revivalist architecture, and their tectonic significance became unstable. This may be because the United States of the early 20th century was a confident nation, and the approach of defining one's own spiritual world by establishing a connection to a great civilization like ancient Egypt faded in such a cultural context.

=== Other countries ===
The South African College in the then-British Cape Colony features an "Egyptian building" constructed in 1841; the Egyptian Revival building of the Cape Town Hebrew Congregation is also still standing.

The York Street Synagogue was Australia's first Egyptian revival building, followed by the Hobart Synagogue, the Launceston Synagogue, and the Adelaide Hebrew Congregation, all by 1850. The earliest obelisk in Australia was erected at Macquarie Place, Sydney, in 1818.

=== Later revivals ===
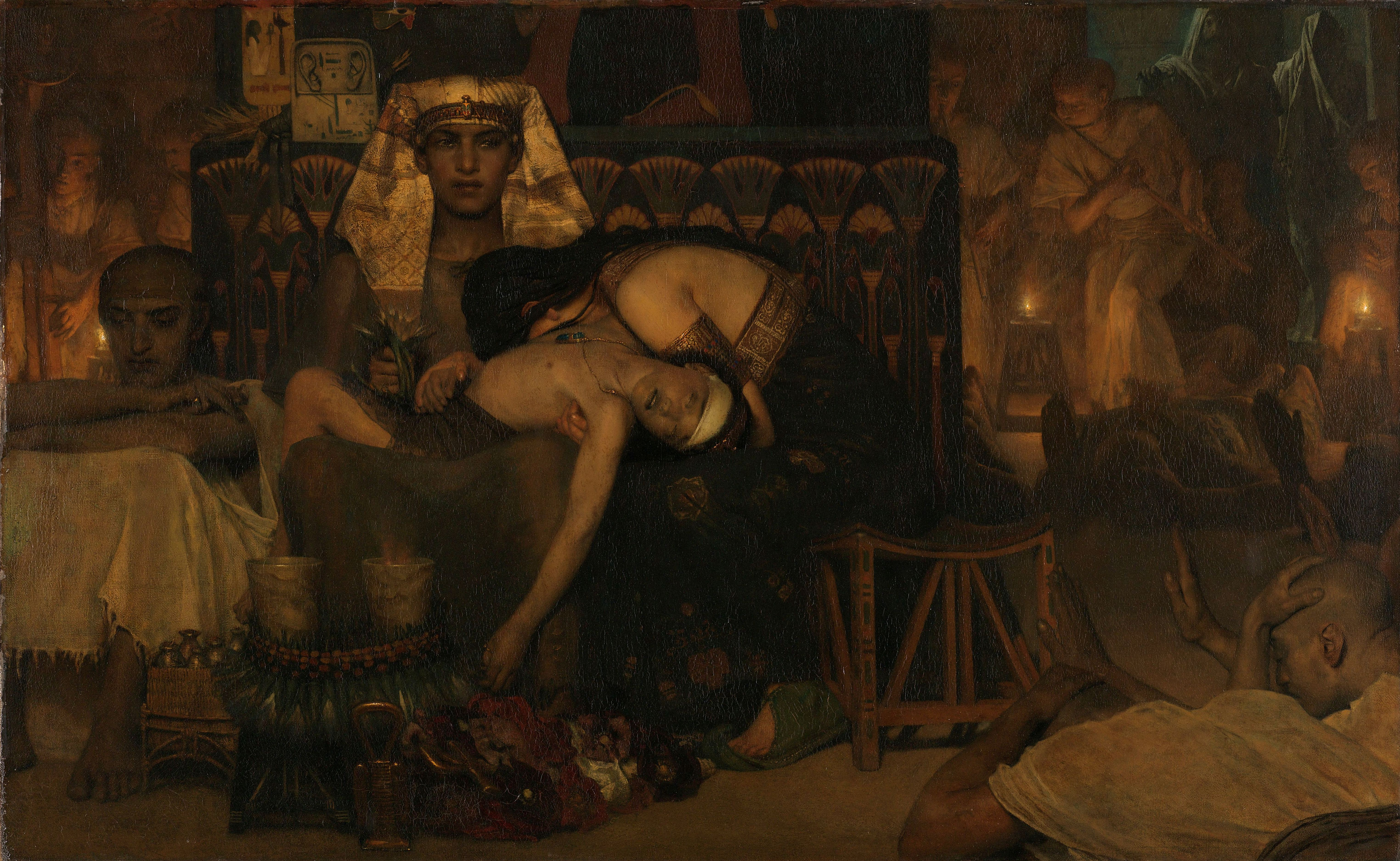
The Death of the Pharaoh's Firstborn Son, by Lawrence Alma-Tadema, 1872, oil on canvas, 77 × 124.5 cm, in the Rijksmuseum in Amsterdam. Revivals of the arts of ancient Egypt were not limited only to architecture. There were also Egyptian Revival designs of furniture, ceramics, candelabra, jewelry, etc. Also, some 19th and very early 20th century Academic paintings shows scenes from Ancient Egypt

The expeditions that eventually led to the discovery in 1922 of Tutankhamun's tomb by archaeologist Howard Carter resulted in a 20th-century revival. The revival during the 1920s is sometimes considered to be part of the Art Deco style. This phase gave birth to the Egyptian Theatre movement, largely confined to the United States. The Egyptian Revival decorative arts style was present in furniture and other household objects, as well as in architecture.

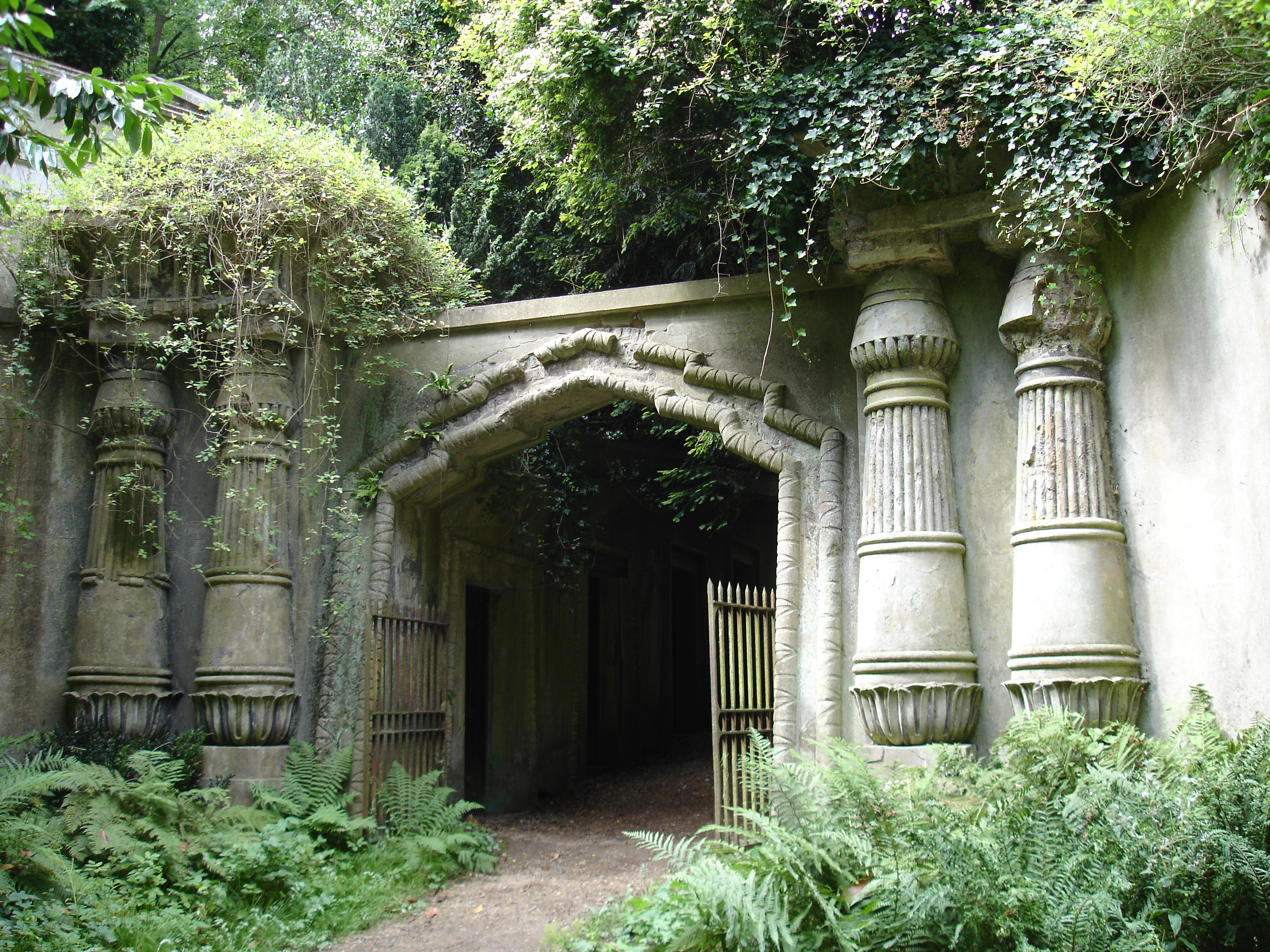
Entrance to Egyptian Avenue of the Highgate Cemetery, London, unknown architect, 19th century

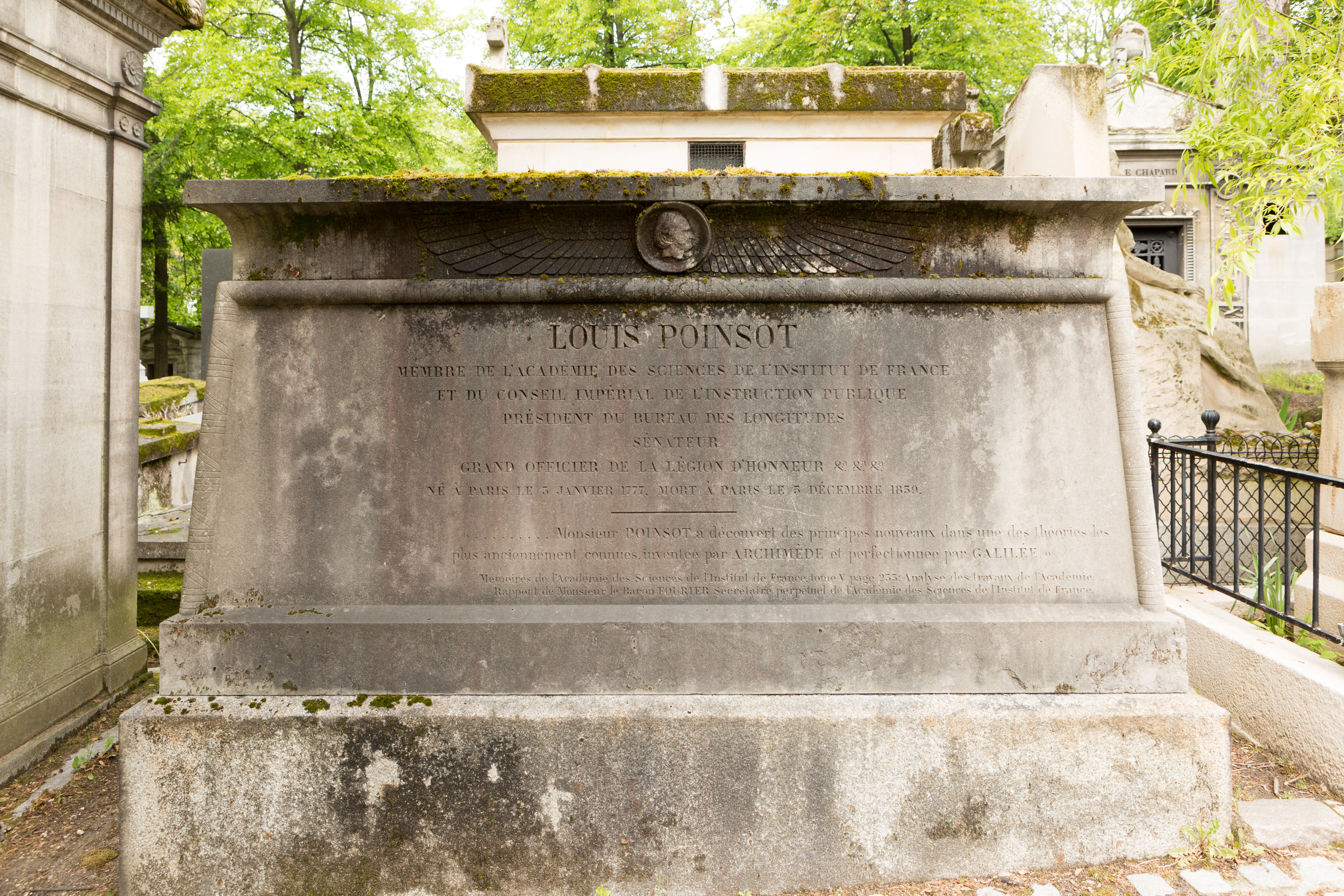
Mixed with Neoclassicism – Grave of Louis Poinsot in Père-Lachaise Cemetery in Paris, by David d'Angers, mid-19th century

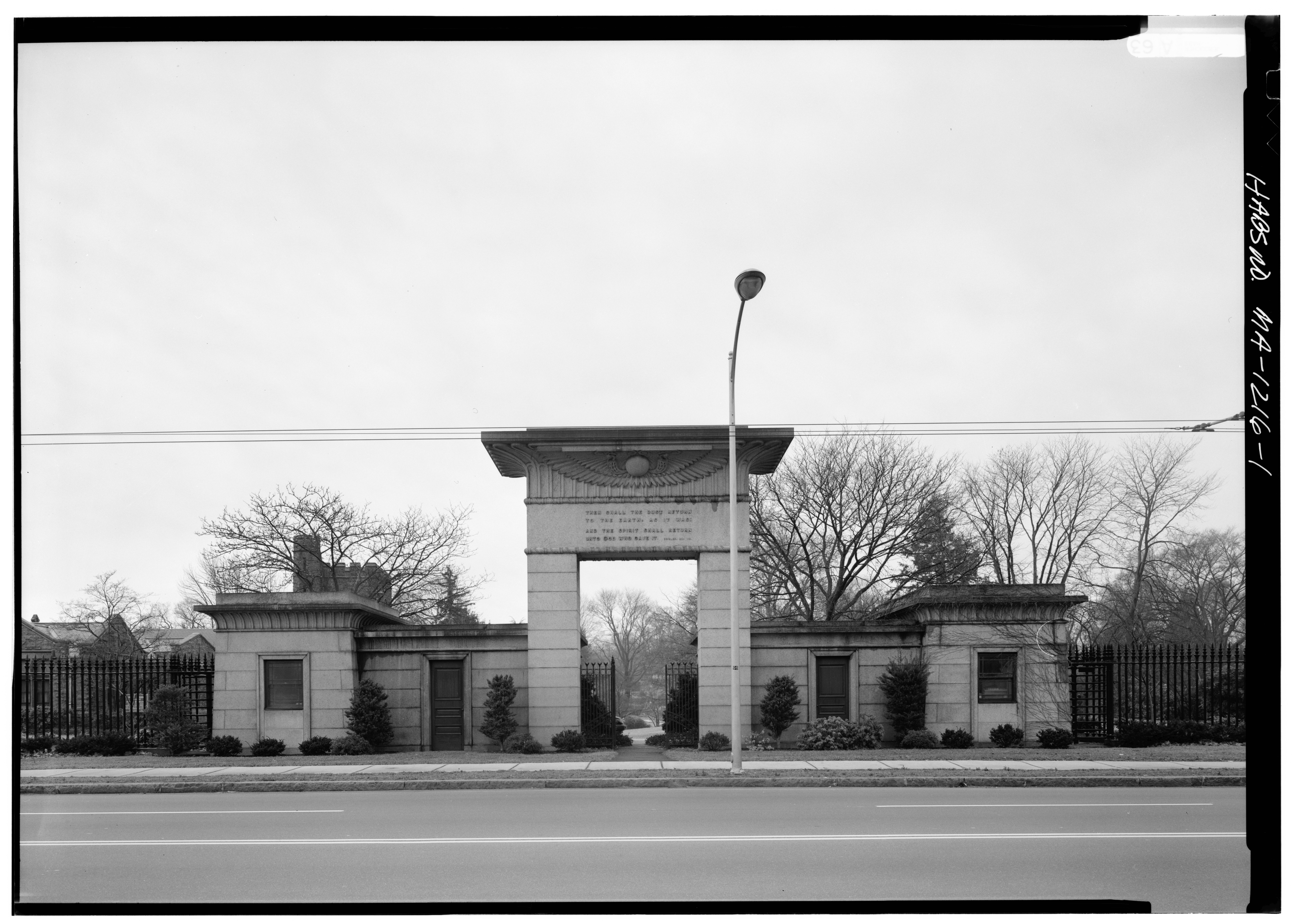
Entry gate of the Mount Auburn Cemetery, located on the line between Cambridge and Watertown, Massachusetts, by Jacob Bigelow

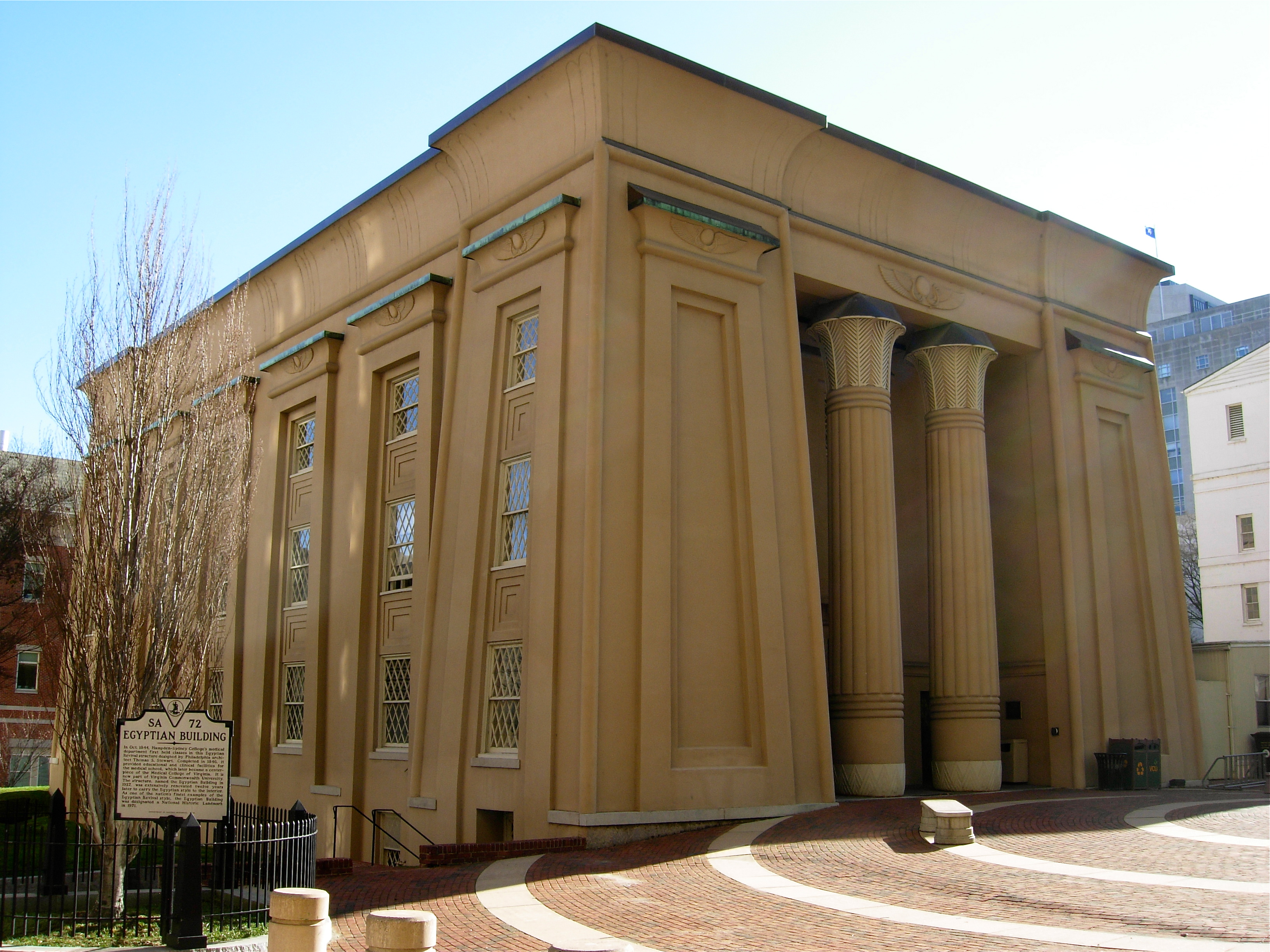
Egyptian Building, part of the Virginia Commonwealth University, Richmond, Virginia, by Thomas Somerville Stewart, 1845

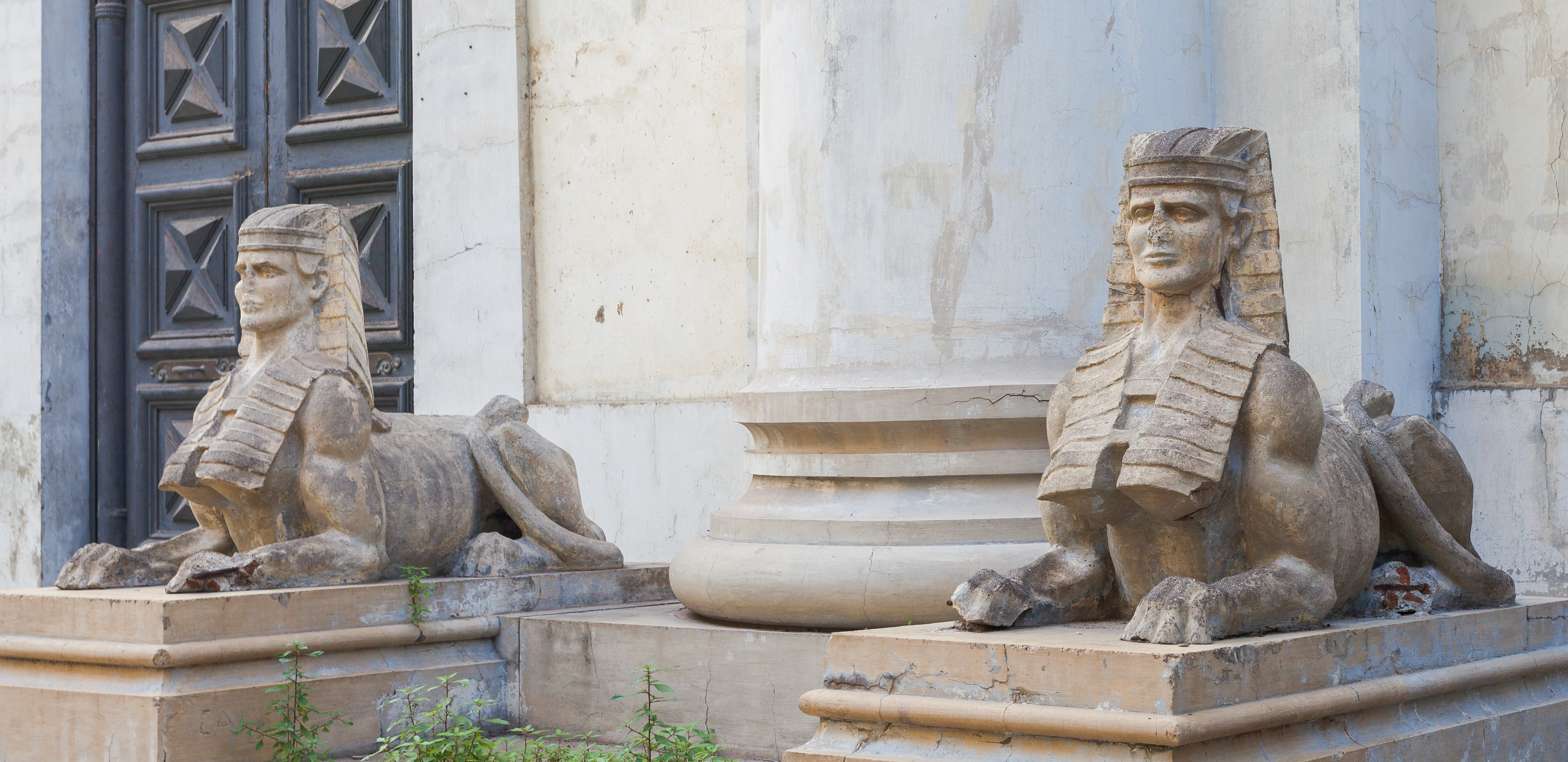
Sphinxes of the Masonic Temple of Santa Cruz de Tenerife, Spain, by Manuel de Cámara, 1899–1902

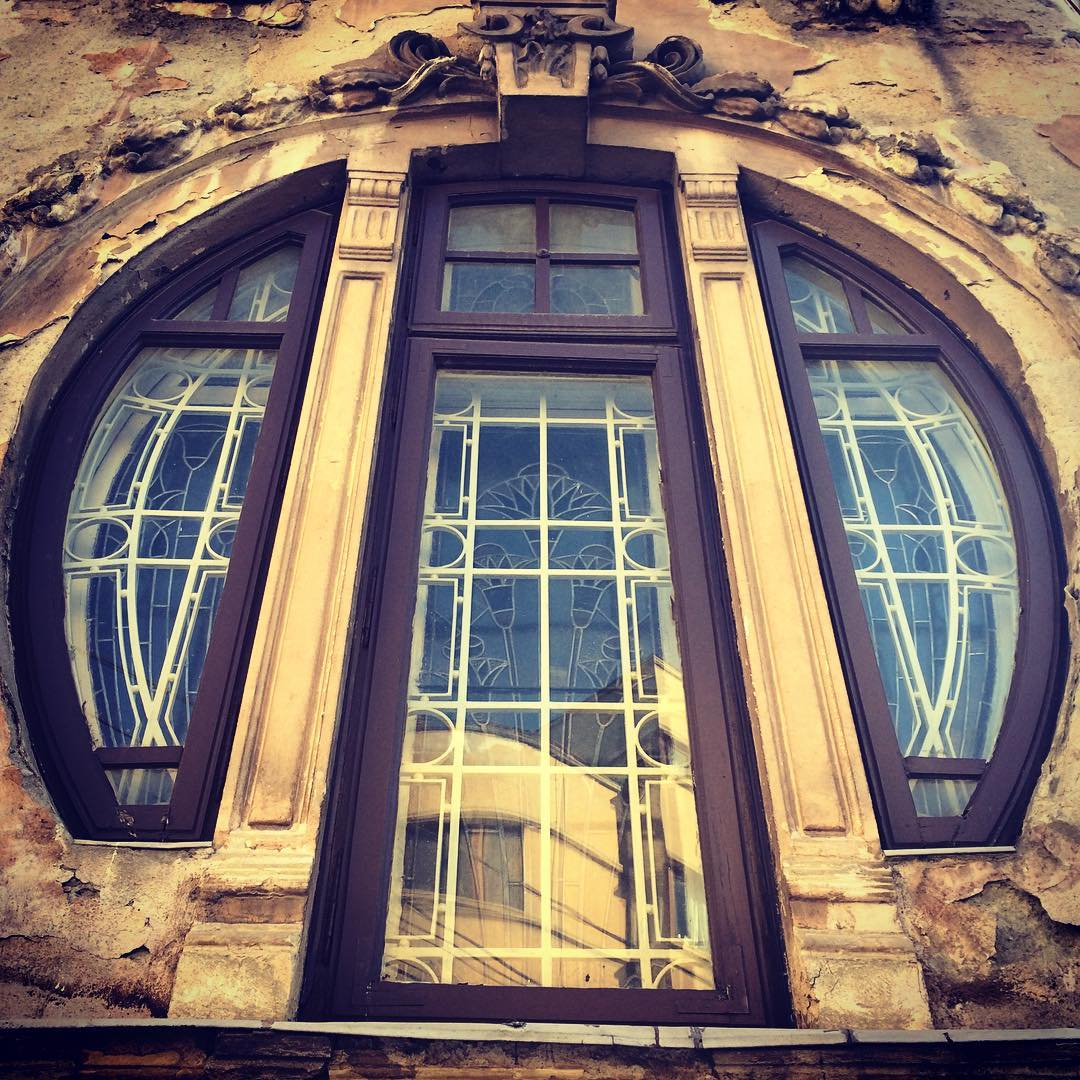
Mixed with Art Nouveau – Stained glass window of the Romulus Porescu House, decorated with lotus flowers, Bucharest, Romania, 1905, by Dimitrie Maimarolu

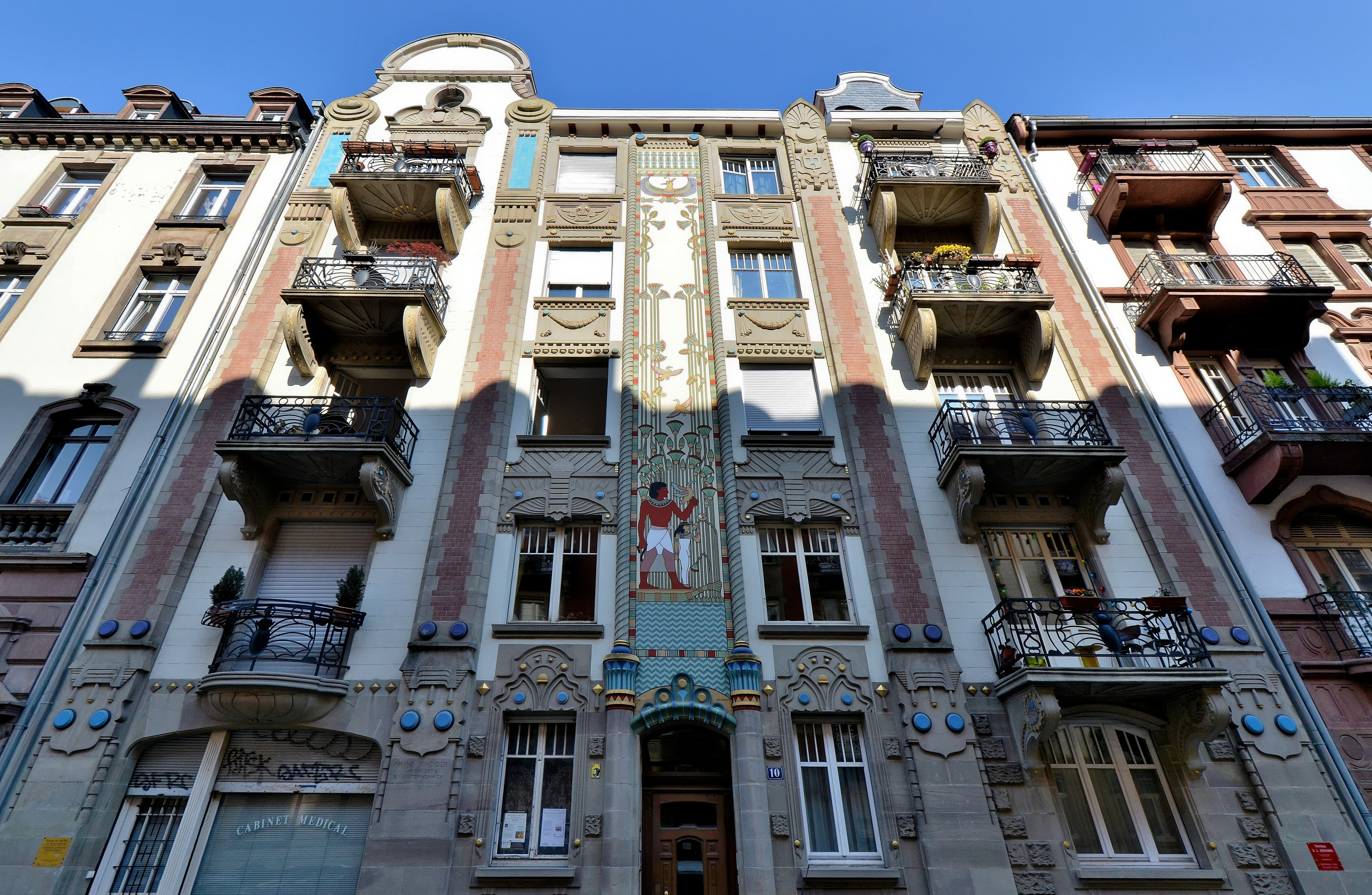
Mixed with Art Nouveau – Egyptian House (Rue du Général Rapp no. 10), Strasbourg, France, designed by the architect Franz Scheyder in collaboration with painter Adolf Zilly, 1905–1906

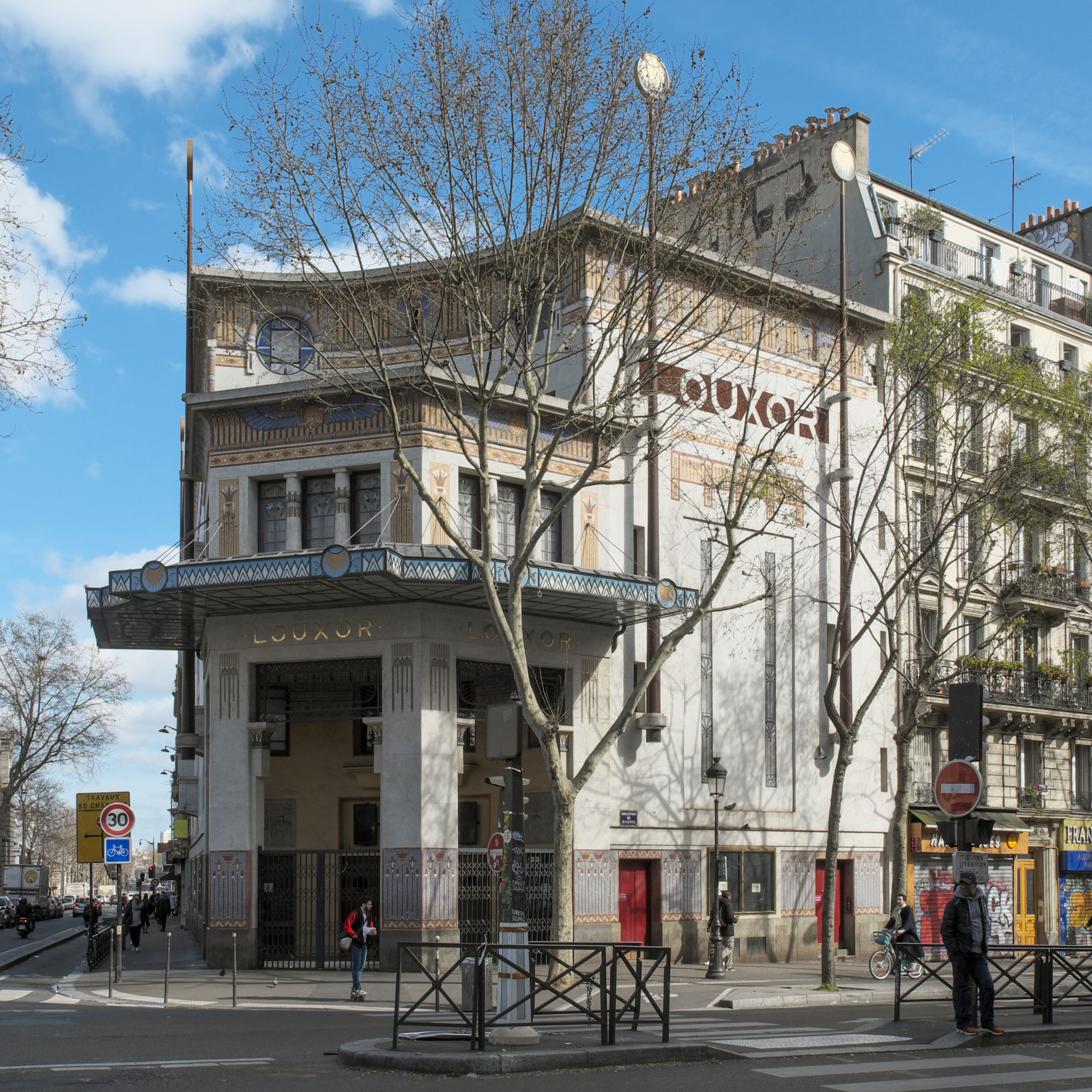
Mixed with Art Deco – Le Louxor Cinema, Paris, by Henri Zipcy, 1919–1921

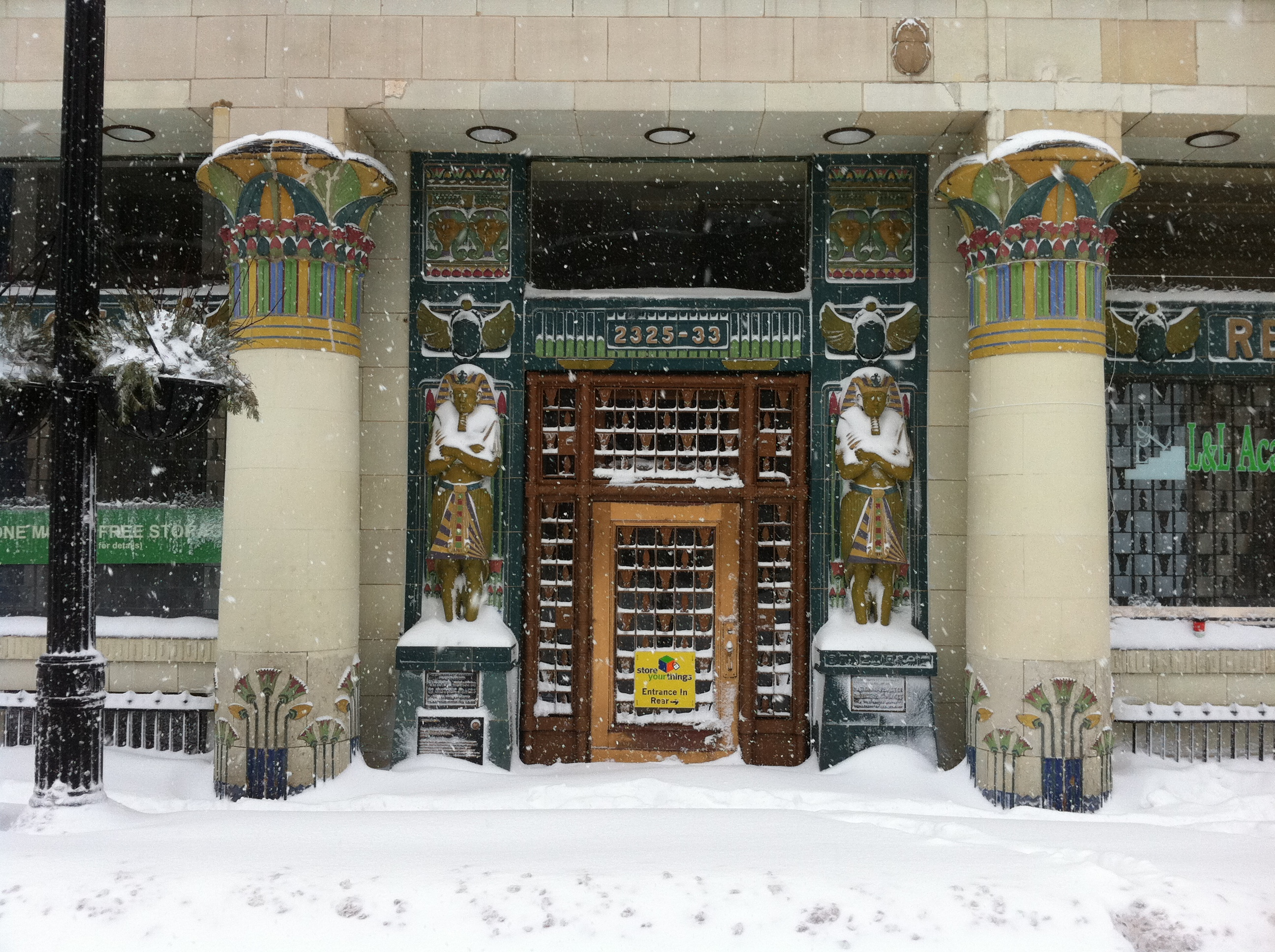
Reebie Storage Warehouse, Chicago IL, 1922, architect George Kingsley and sculptor Fritz Albert

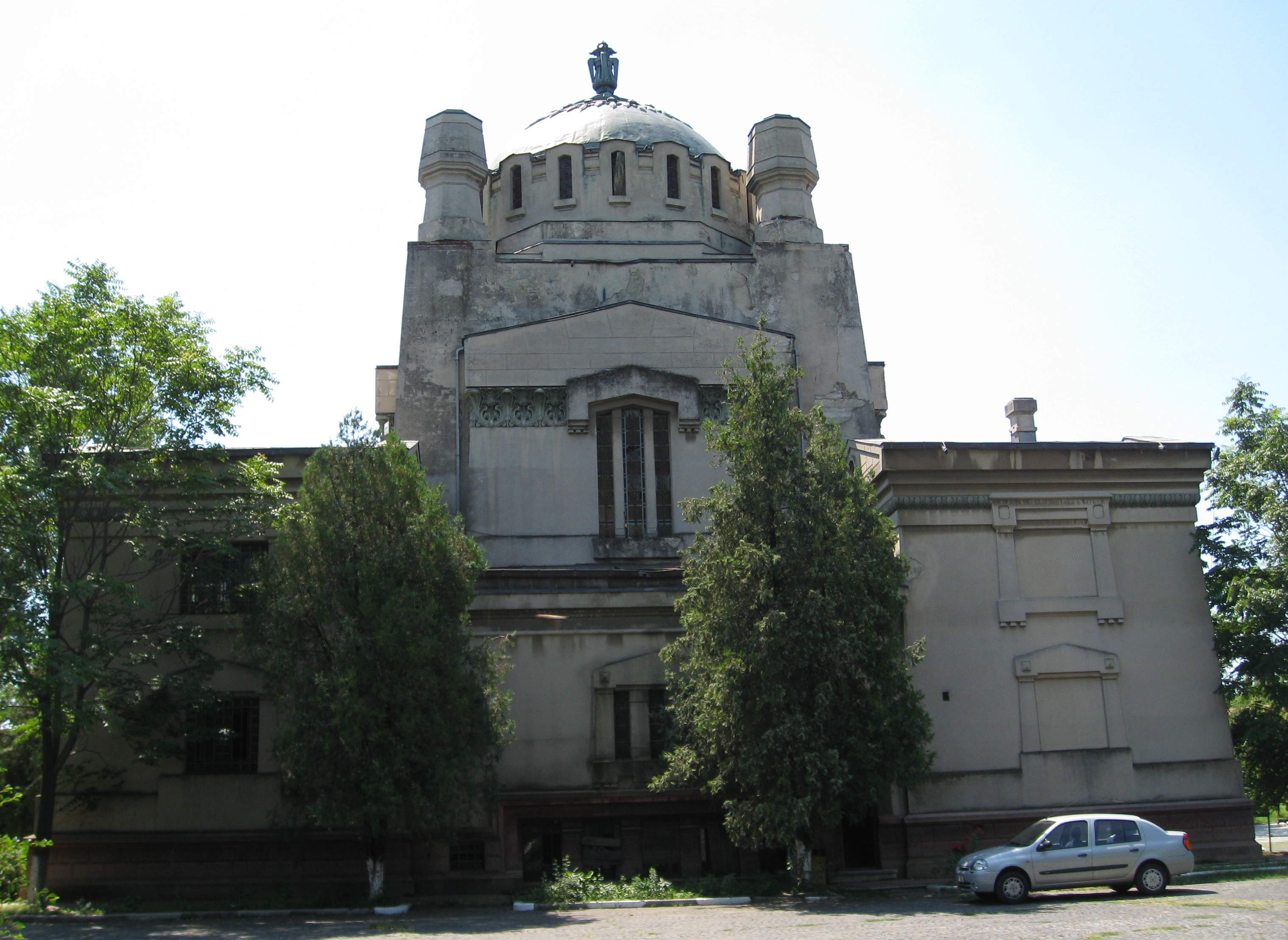
Mixed with Romanian Revival and Art Deco – Cenușa Crematory, mixing Egyptian Revival volumes and shapes with other styles, Bucharest, by Duiliu Marcu, 1925–1934

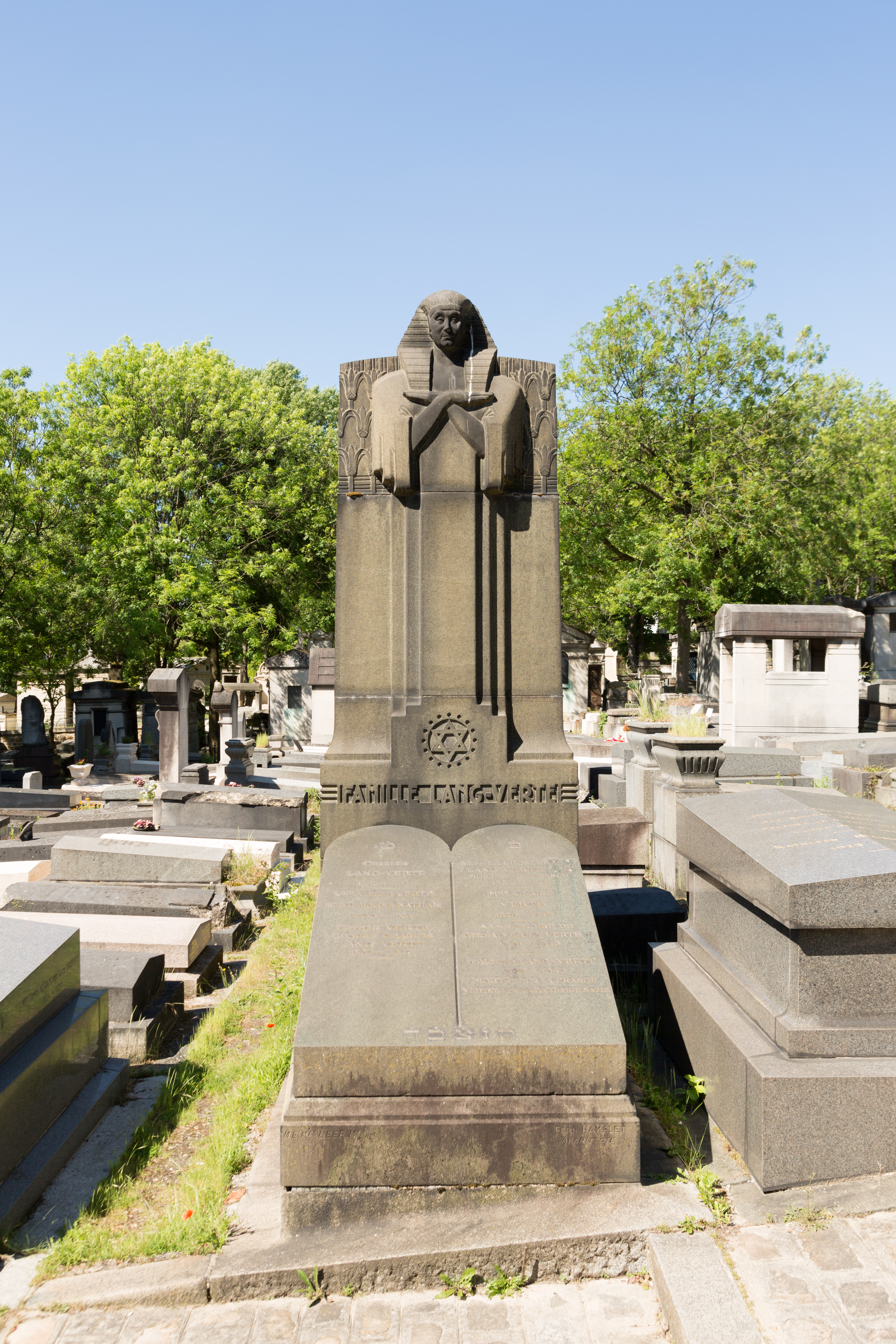
Mixed with Art Deco – Grave of Lang-Verte, Père-Lachaise Cemetery, unknown architect, c.1920s

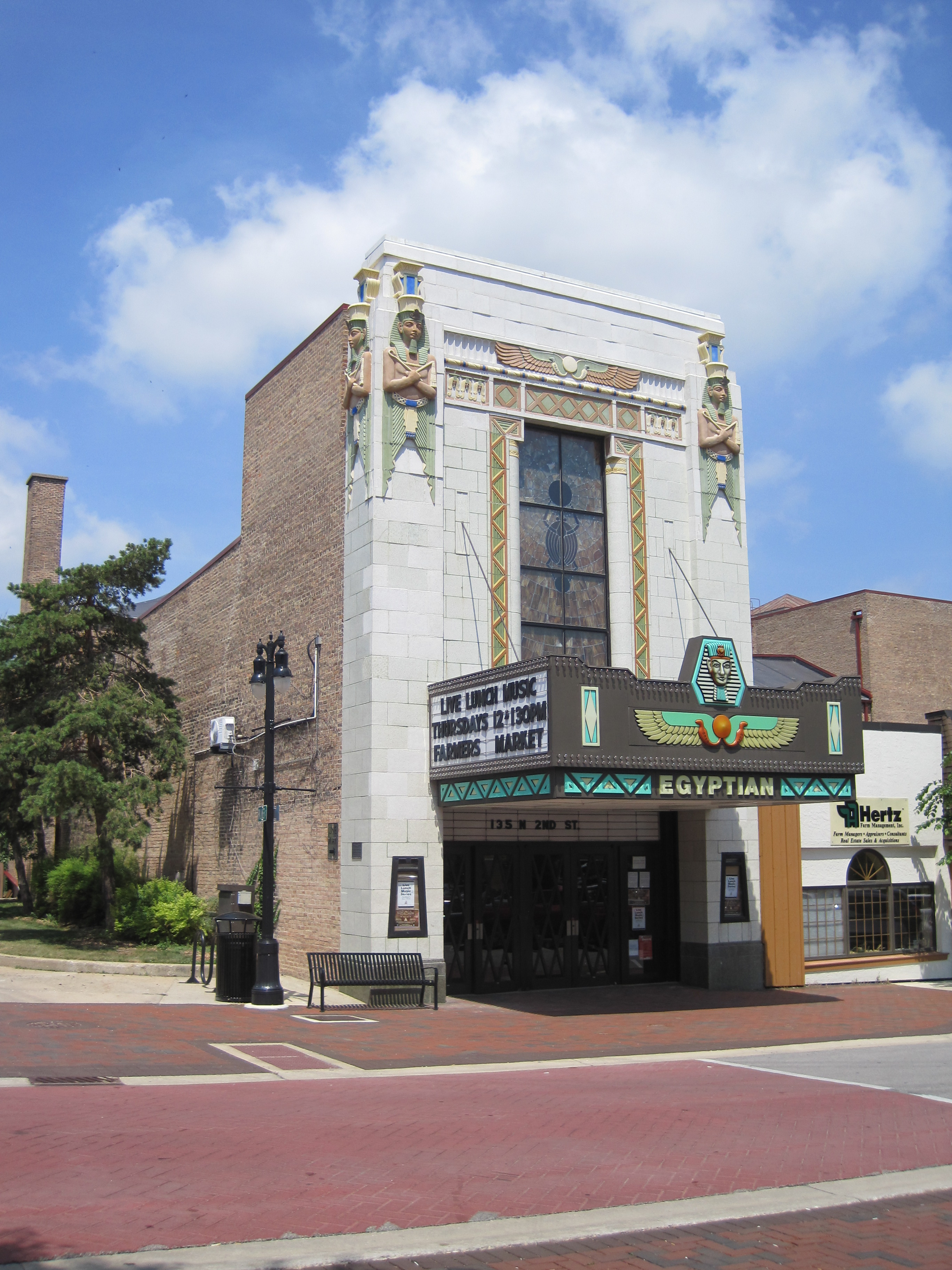
Mixed with Art Deco – Egyptian Theatre (DeKalb, Illinois), by Elmer F. Behrns, 1929–1930

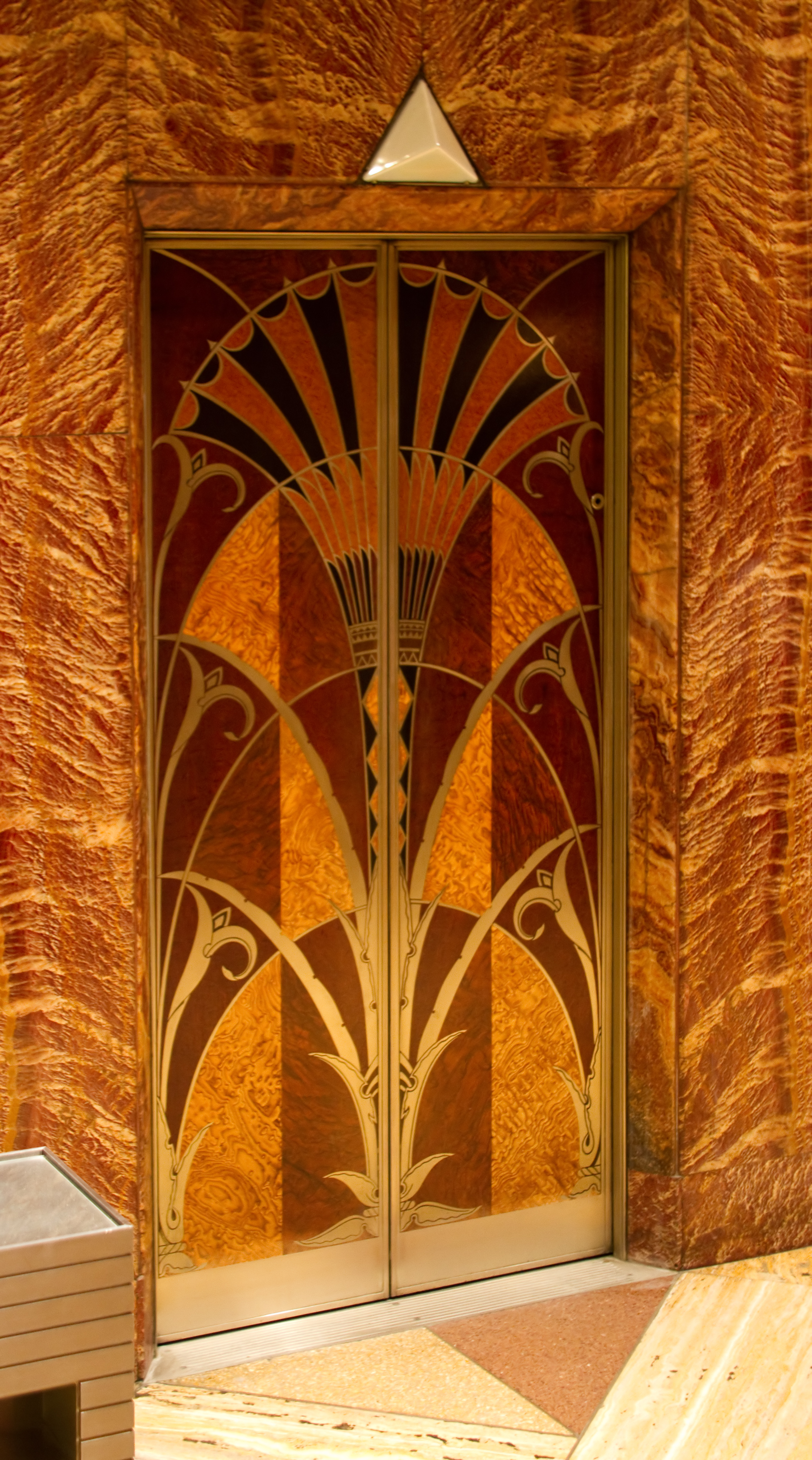
Mixed with Art Deco – Elevator door in the Chrysler Building, New York City, by William van Alen, 1929–1930

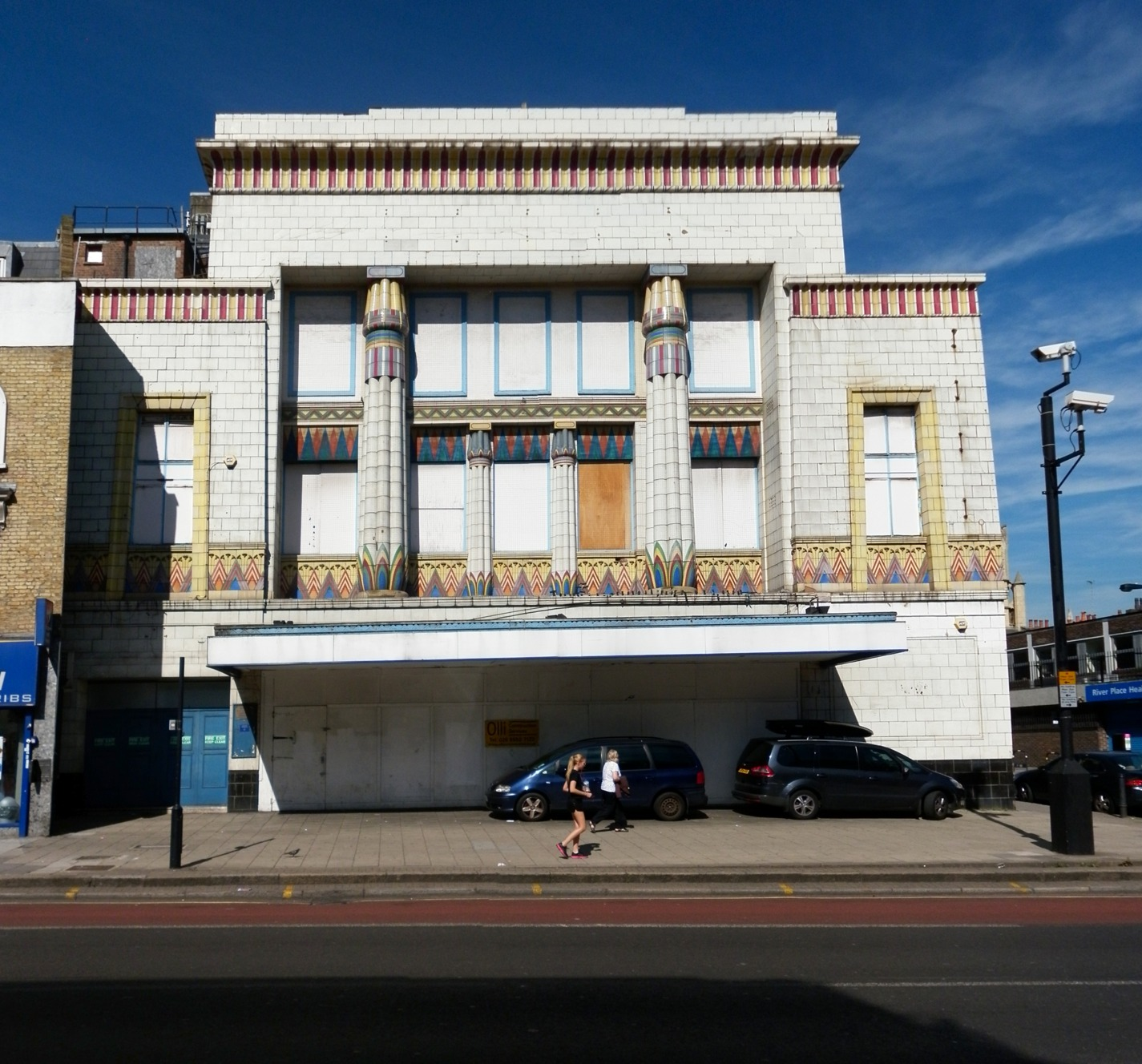
Mixed with Art Deco – Carlton Cinema, Essex Road, Islington, London, by George Coles, 1930

Contemporary revivals

Contemporary Egyptian revival architecture is not as prevalent as it was in the 30s, even up to the 50s. There are two types of contemporary Egyptian Revival described here: concepts of Egyptian architecture or highly themed Egyptomania architecture. An example of an Egyptian revival architecture concept is the I.M. Pei Louvre Pyramid (1984 to 1989), although the architect refuses the correlation to the Ancient Egyptians, stating that the pyramid is a demonstration of pure form. But the public connects the Louvre Pyramid to the Giza Pyramids, which has caused controversy, almost leading to the project's cancellation. Also, researchers discovered connections of the I.M. Pei pyramids to Ancient Egyptian themes, themes like civilization. The reason for the connection is the Louvre's and Egyptian archaeology's mutual history. Additionally, the underground elements of the pyramid correlate to the underground structures of the Egyptian Pyramids, according to the same researchers. The only additional ideologies in contemporary Egyptian revival architecture are based on the philosophical and religious ideology of immortality, and within the last 30 years, Egyptian pyramid elements in cemeteries are still prevalent for that reason. Some contemporary architecture uses Egyptian revival to tie buildings to Ancient Egyptian ideologies. Some include museum exhibitions (ex., the Royal Ontario Museum train station), justice buildings to tie to ancient Egyptian justice ideals, schools to tie to their scientific progress, and tombs or shrines to immortality.

In the 1970s through to the 2000s, there was some Egyptian revival because of America's re-fascination with King Tutankhamun due to the 1976 to 1979 exhibition of the king's tomb. Another revival reason for Egyptomania in contemporary architecture is "mummy mania". The version of ancient Egypt in movies created an interest in ancient Egypt, which led to the construction of themed experiences. The construction of themed experiences for monetization in entertainment and retail heightened in the early contemporary architecture, which brought to life the Luxor Hotel (1993, Las Vegas) by Veldon Sympson, with immersive experiences and a themed hotel experience around Ancient Egypt. Contemporary Egyptomania architecture was themed around ancient Egyptian fantasicalization, and an example of contemporary Egyptian Revival in residential architecture is Jim Onon's property built in the 1980s. Jim Onan was a wealthy American who transformed part of his property in Illinois with an Egyptomania theme, which caused controversy. The construction included an alley of sphinxes and multiple pyramids, with one being coated in 24-carat gold.

An example of museum Egyptian revival architecture is The Royal Ontario Museum Metro Station by Diamond Schmitt, which was built in 2008 in Toronto, Canada. As one of the most recent Egyptian Revival Architecture, it is entirely based on artifacts from the museum, including the hieroglyphs and the sculptures. The architects consulted historians and scholars to design the station, the statue of a mummified Osiris with a king's headdress, and to replicate historical artifacts, which are all replicas from the ones in the museum, including all the hieroglyphs (based on the reliefs in the gallery). This project aims to enhance the quality of life and connect history to the community.

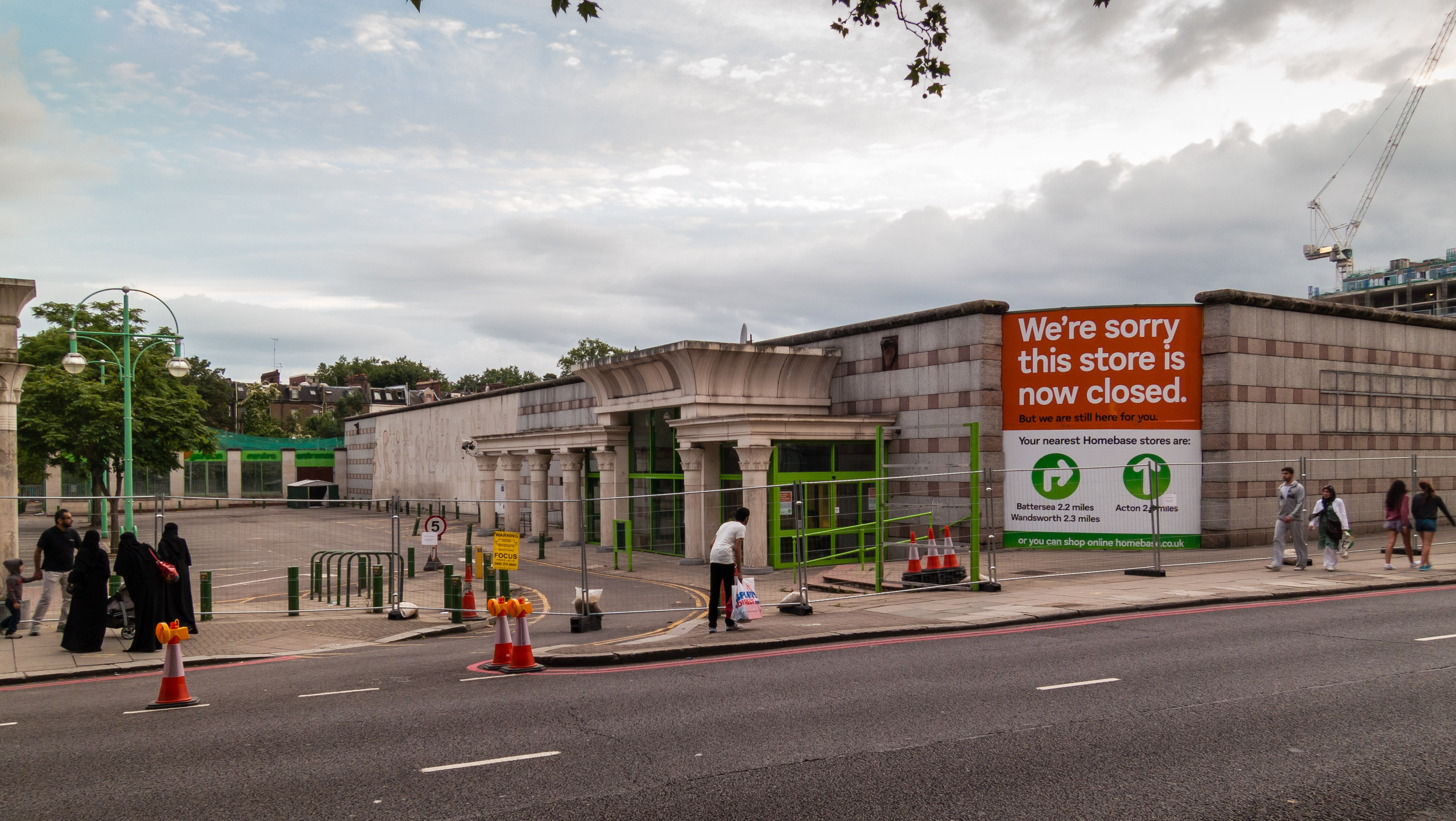
Mixed with Postmodernism – Homebase (Warwick Road, Royal Borough of Kensington and Chelsea, London, by Ian Pollard, 1998–1990, demolished in 2014

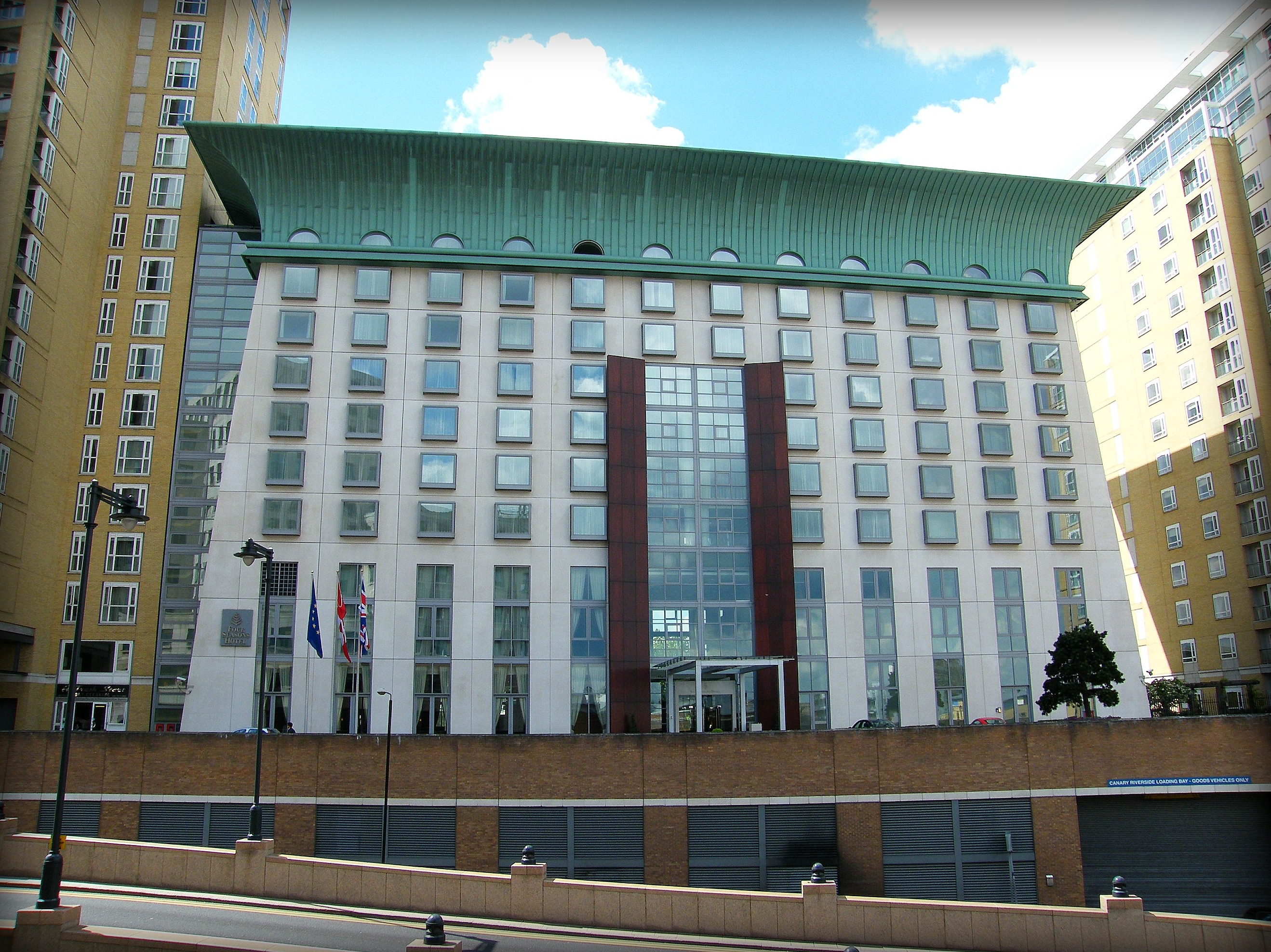
Mixed with Postmodernism – Canary Riverside Plaza, London, by César Pelli, 1991

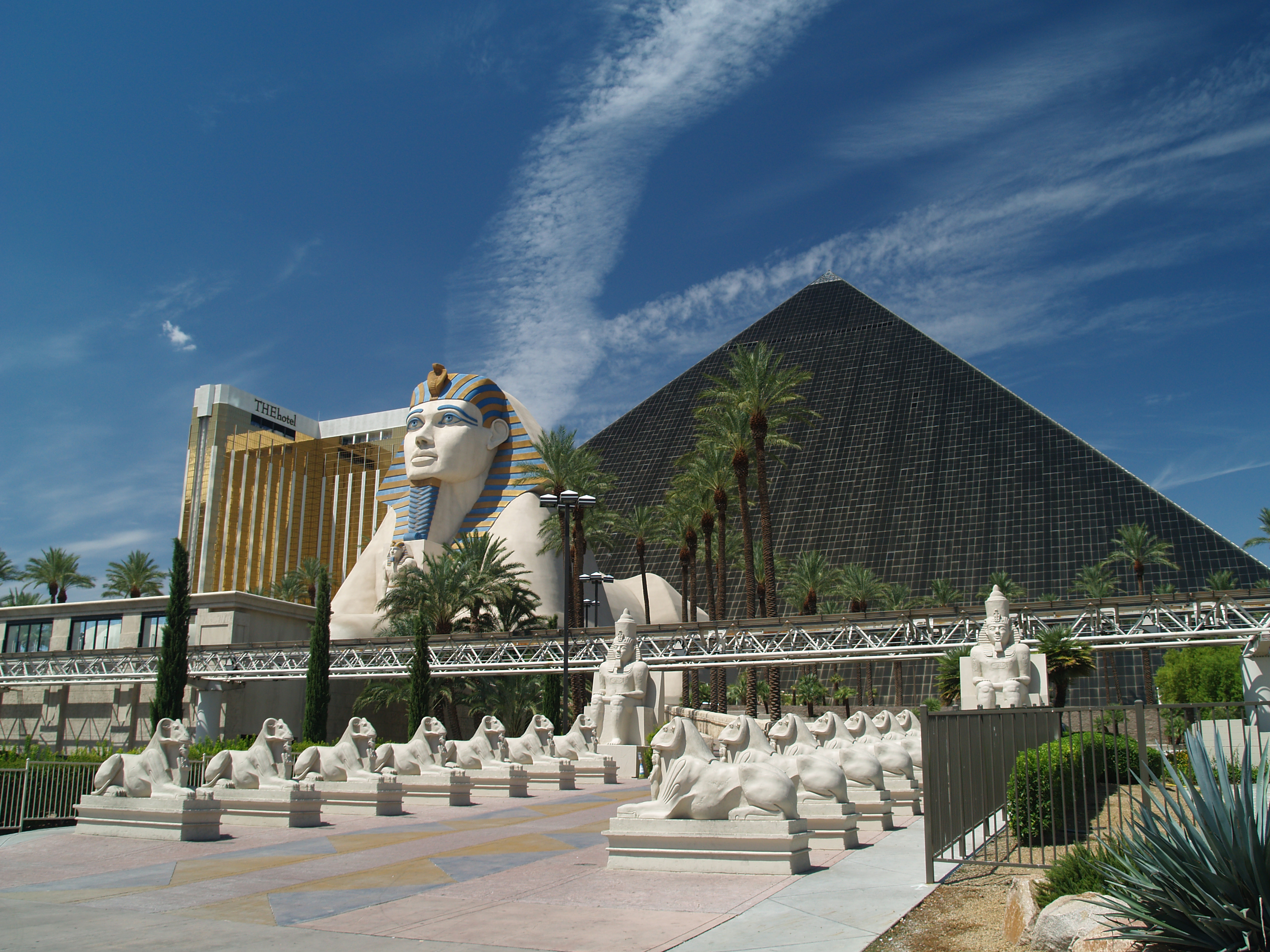
Mixed with Postmodernism – Luxor Hotel and Casino in Las Vegas, by Veldon Simpson and Perini Building Company, 1992–1993

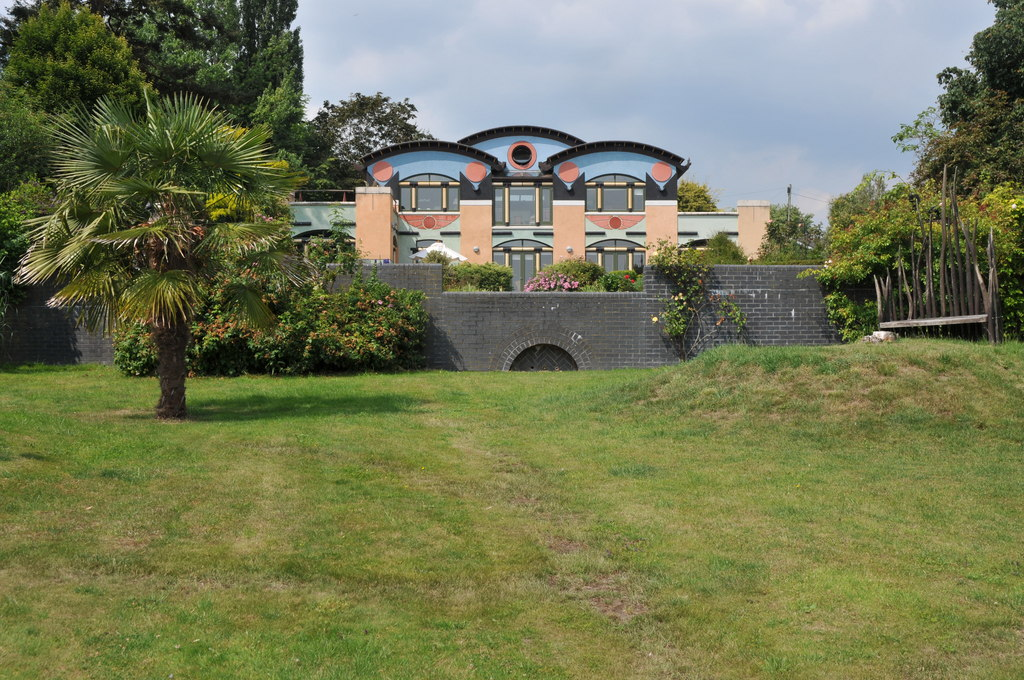
Mixed with Postmodernism – Sphinx Hill, Moulsford, UK, by John Outram, 1999

==== Hieroglyphics ====
Many notable works in Britain featured attempts by architects to translate and depict messages in Egyptian hieroglyphs. Although sincere attempts at compositions, understanding of hieroglyphic syntax and semantics has advanced since they were built and errors have been discovered in many of these works. Although both public and private buildings were built in Britain in the Egyptian Revival style, the vast majority of those with attempts at accurate inscriptions were public works or on entrances to public buildings.

In 1824, French classical scholar and Egyptologist Jean-François Champollion published Précis du système hiéroglyphique des anciens Égyptiens 1824, which spurred the first notable attempts to decipher the hieroglyphic language in Britain. Joseph Bonomi the Younger's inscriptions in the entrance lodges to Abney Park Cemetery in 1840 were the first real recorded attempt to compose a legible text. An Egyptologist himself, Bonomi and other scholars such as Samuel Birch, Samuel Sharpe, William Osburne, and others would compose texts for a variety of other British projects throughout the nineteenth century including Marshall's Mill in Leeds, an aedicula in the grounds of Hartwell House, Buckinghamshire, and as part of an Egyptian exhibition in The Crystal Palace after it was re-erected in southeast London.

The content of the inscriptions varied depending on the nature of their specific projects. The Crystal Palace exhibition features several different inscriptions, with the main inscription detailing the construction and content of the hall and proclaiming it as an educational asset to the community. It ends with a message to invoke good fortune, translated as "let it be prosperous". Other smaller inscriptions on the cornice of the exhibit entrance feature the names of the builders and a message in Greek wishing for the health and well-being of Queen Victoria and Prince Albert, members of the royal family. The main inscription is accompanied by an English translation, with the characters spaced to match the position of the English words. However, Chris Elliot notes that the translation overly relies on phonetic transliteration and features some unusual characters for words that were difficult to translate into hieroglyphs.

== List of buildings ==
=== In Africa ===
- c. 1820: Donkin Memorial, Port Elizabeth, South Africa
- 1849: Cape Agulhas Lighthouse, the second-oldest lighthouse in South Africa; also called the "Pharos of the South"

=== In Asia ===
- 1914: Regional Studies Museum, Krasnoyarsk, Russia

=== In Europe ===
- 18–12 BC: Pyramid of Cestius, Rome
- 1798: Karlsruhe Synagogue
- 1822: Egyptian temple in Łazienki Park, Warsaw, Poland
- 1824: 42 Fore Street in Hertford, known locally as the Egyptian House, is an English Heritage Grade II listed building built on the site of a former inn; a grocery store from the Victorian era until the 1960s, now a restaurant
- 1835–1837: Egyptian House, Penzance, Cornwall; built by local bookseller John Lavin as a museum, it is still standing
- 1836–1840: Temple Works, a former flax mill, Holbeck, Leeds, England; built for textile industrialist John Marshall and held the distinction of being the largest single room in the world when it was built
- 1838–1839: The Egyptian Avenue and inner circle of the Lebanon Circle in Highgate Cemetery, London, England
- 1838–1840: Temple Lodges Abney Park, London Borough of Hackney, England
- 1839–1849 Thorvaldsen Museum, Copenhagen, Denmark
- 1846–1848: Old Synagogue at Canterbury, England
- 1856: Egyptian Temple housing elephants at the Antwerp Zoo; designed by Charles Servais
- 1862–1864: Egyptian temple in the park of Stibbert Museum in Florence, Italy
- 1870: The Egyptian Halls, Glasgow; designed by Alexander Thomson
- 1881–1889: Mausoleo Schilizzi, Naples, Italy
- 1891: The Typhonium near Wissant; designed by Belgian architect Edmond De Vigne
- 1899: Sha'ar Hashamayim Synagogue, Cairo, Egypt
- 1902: Masonic Temple of Santa Cruz de Tenerife, Spain
- 1919: Mukhtar Museum, Cairo
- 1921: Louxor theater, Paris
- 1922: Collège des Frères d'Heliopolis, Cairo
- 1925: AbdulHamid al-Shawarby Pasha building, Cairo
- 1927: Mausoleum of Saad Zaghloul, Cairo
- 1927– 1928: Collins & Parri's Arcadia Works for Carreras, London
- 1926–1928: Carreras Cigarette Factory, Camden, London
- 1930: Foyer of Oliver Percy Bernard's Strand Palace Hotel, London (destr. 1967–8; parts now London, V&A)
- 1932: Ismailia Monuments Museum in Ismailia, Egypt
- 1933: Moussa Dar'i Synagogue, Cairo
- 1934 Pyramid Theatre, Sale, Greater Manchester, UK (formerly a cinema, both independent and Odeon, now a Sports Direct)
- 1930–1937: National Museum of Beirut
- 1942: Faculty of Engineering, Alexandria University campus in Alexandria, Egypt
- 1946: Royal Rest House, Giza Pyramid Complex, Giza, Egypt
- 1961: Cairo Tower, Cairo
- 1974: Unknown Soldier Memorial in Cairo
- unknown: Lamati Court, Minya, Egypt
- 1924–1929: Lenin's Mausoleum, Moscow; designed by Aleksey Shchusev using elements borrowed from the Pyramid of Djoser
- 1825–1826: Egyptian Bridge, St. Petersburg; collapsed on 20 January 1905, but the 1955 replacement incorporated sphinxes, and several portions of it remain
- 1827–1830: Egyptian Gate of Tsarskoe Selo, St. Petersburg

=== In North America ===
- Washington Monument, Washington, D.C.
- Battle Monument, Baltimore, Maryland
- 1826–1830: Groton Monument, Groton, Connecticut
- 1833–1836: New Jersey State Penitentiary in Trenton, New Jersey; designed by John Haviland
- 1834–1835: American Institute, New York City
- 1835: Moyamensing Prison, Philadelphia; designed by Thomas Ustick Walter; demolished in 1968
- 1836: 4th Precinct Police Station on Rousseau Street, New Orleans; designed by Benjamin Buisson, it originally served as a jail and police station. Later altered significantly; now used by the Knights of Babylon krewe for Mardi Gras float storage
- 1838: Green-Wood Cemetery, New York City
- 1838: The Tombs, a court and jail complex, New York City; by John Haviland; demolished in 1902
- 1838: Pennsylvania Fire Insurance building, Philadelphia; by John Haviland
- 1839: Predecessor of Union Station, Springfield, Massachusetts; destroyed by fire in 1851
- 1840: Gates of the Granary Burying Ground, Boston; by Isaiah Rogers
- 1842: Croton Distributing Reservoir, New York City
- 1827–1843: Bunker Hill Monument, Charleston neighborhood of Boston
- 1843: Gates and gatehouses of Mount Auburn Cemetery, Cambridge, Massachusetts; designed by Jacob Bigelow
- 1844: Old Whaler's Church, Sag Harbor, New York; designed by Minard Lafever
- 1845: Medical College, Richmond, Virginia; designed by Thomas Somerville Stewart
- 1845: The brownstone entry gates of the Grove Street Cemetery, New Haven, Connecticut; by Henry Austin,
- 1849–1851: Downtown Presbyterian Church, Nashville, Tennessee; designed by William Strickland
- 1846: First Baptist Church, Essex, Connecticut
- 1856: Skull and Bones undergraduate secret society at Yale University, New Haven, Connecticut (architect's attribution in dispute—may also be Henry Austin of the Grove Street Cemetery gates)
- 1894: The Cairo apartment building, Washington, D.C.
- 1914: Masonic Temple, Charlotte, North Carolina (1914–87)
- 1914–1916: Winona Savings Bank Building, Winona, Minnesota
- 1915: Colonial Theatre, Bethlehem, New Hampshire
- 1920: Marmon Hupmobile Showroom, Chicago; designed by Paul Gerhardt
- 1922: Grauman's Egyptian Theatre, Los Angeles
- 1924: Peery’s Egyptian Theater, Ogden, Utah
- 1925: Egyptian Theatre, Coos Bay, Oregon
- 1926: Bala Theatre, Bala Cynwyd, Pennsylvania
- 1926: Egyptian Theatre, Park City
- 1927: The Egyptian Theatre, Boise, Idaho
- 1927: Pythian Temple, New York City
- 1928: Lincoln Theatre, Columbus, Ohio; interior only
- 1928: Egyptian Theatre, Delta, Colorado
- 1929: Egyptian Theatre, DeKalb, Illinois
- 1939: Social Security Administration Building, Washington, DC
- 1966: Rosicrucian Egyptian Museum, San Jose, California

=== In Oceania ===
- 1844: Launceston Synagogue, Tasmania, Australia
- 1845: Hobart Synagogue, Tasmania, Australia
- 1927: Emulation Hall, Melbourne, Victoria, Australia
- 1931: Masonic Centre, Sandringham, Melbourne, Victoria, Australia
- 1934: Former Perth Girls' School, Perth, Western Australia, Australia
- 1937: Manly Town Hall, Sydney, New South Wales, Australia

=== Post-Modern variants ===
- 1989: Louvre Pyramid, Paris
- 1991: Pyramid Arena, Memphis, Tennessee
- 1992: Cheesecake Factory
- 1993: Tama-Re, Eatonton, Georgia; demolished 2005
- 1993: Luxor Hotel and Casino, Las Vegas
- 1995: City Stars Heliopolis, Cairo
- 1996: The Lost World of Reptiles, an exhibit at the Australian Reptile Park, Somersby, New South Wales, Australia
- 1997: Wafi City, Wafi, Dubai City, Dubai, UAE
- 1997: Sunway Pyramid, Bandar Sunway, Malaysia
- 2000: Muvico Cinema, Arundel Mills, Maryland (sold to Cinemark in 2009)
- 2001: Embassy of the Arab Republic of Egypt, Berlin
- 2001: Supreme Constitutional Court of Egypt building, Cairo
- 2001: Scotiabank Theatre Chinook Centre, Calgary, Alberta
- 2010: Sohag International Airport terminal building, Sohag, Egypt
- 2010: Fairmont Nile City, Cairo
- 2019–present: New Administrative Capital, Egypt, including Iconic Tower (Egypt), Oblisco Capitale, The Octagon (Egypt), Egyptian New Parliament, Presidential Palace, and more
- 2022: Cairo Security Directorate, New Cairo, Egypt

== See also ==
- Egyptian Revival decorative arts
- Ancient Egyptian architecture
