= Montgomery Park (Portland, Oregon) =

Historic building in Portland, Oregon, U.S.

- Montgomery Ward & Company Building
- U.S. National Register of Historic Places
- Portland Historic Landmark
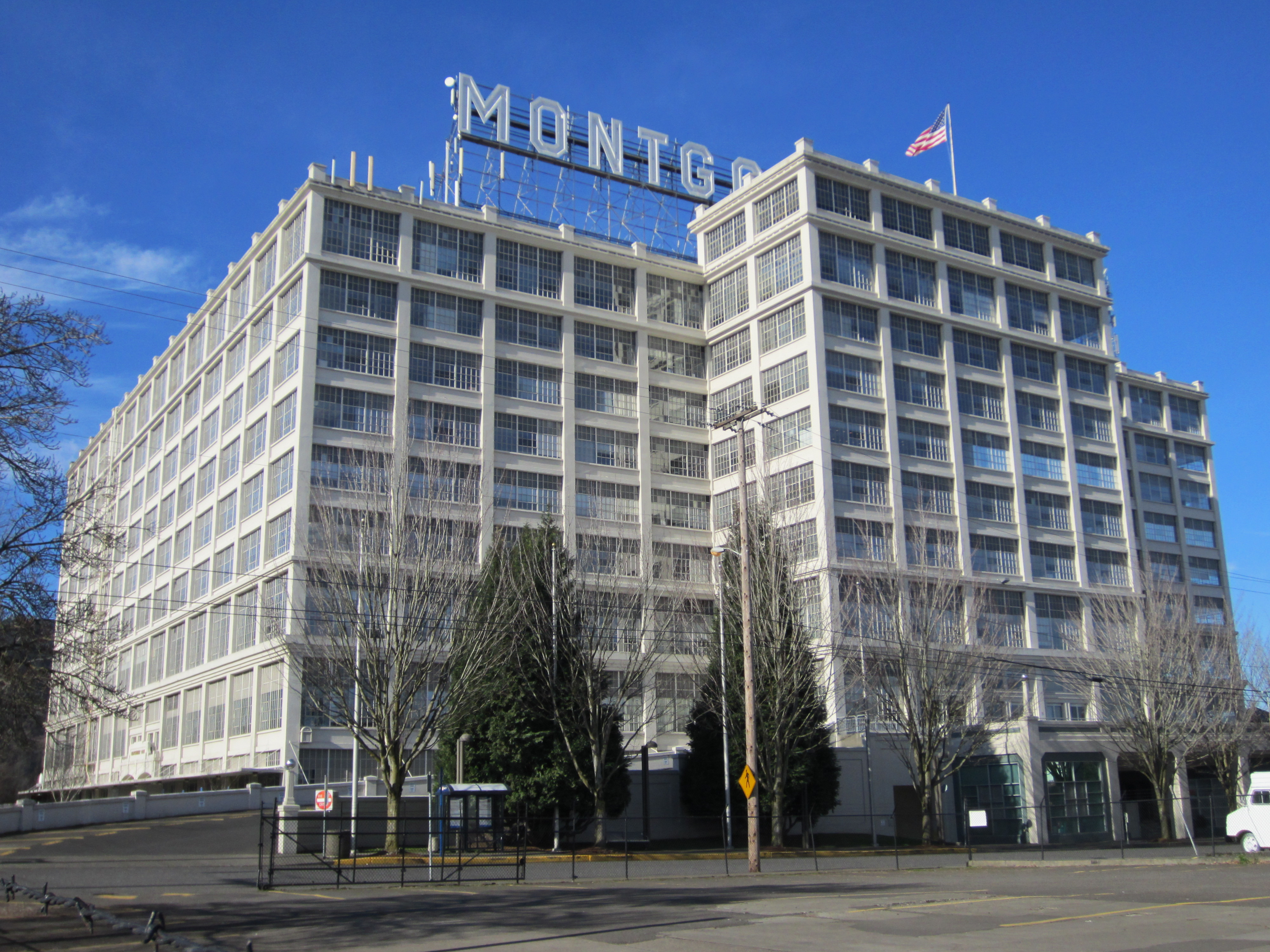
- Montgomery Park in 2012, east façade

- Location within Portland, Oregon
- Location: 2741 NW Vaughn Street, Portland, Oregon
- Coordinates: 45°32′15″N 122°42′28″W
- Area: 8.59 acres (3.48 ha)
- Built: 1920; expanded 1935–36
- Architect: W. H. McCaully
- NRHP reference No.: 85001184; 100006705 (decrease)

Significant dates
- Added to NRHP: June 6, 1985
- Boundary decrease: July 9, 2021

Montgomery Park is an office building and former Montgomery Ward mail-order catalog warehouse and department store located in Portland, Oregon, United States, built in 1920. It is listed on the National Register of Historic Places under its historic name Montgomery Ward & Company Building. The building is located on property once used for the Lewis and Clark Centennial Exposition, of 1905. It was occupied by Montgomery Ward from 1920 until 1985, although the majority of the company's operations at this location ended in 1982. After the U.S. Bancorp Tower and the Wells Fargo Center, the building is the third-largest office building in Portland with 756,055 square feet (70,239.8 m^{2}).

== Description and original uses ==
At the time of its completion, in September 1920, the building was the largest in the city, as measured by floor space, which was approximately 569,000 square feet (52,900 m^{2}) originally. A 229,000-square-foot (21,300 m^{2}) wing was added to the building's northwest corner in 1935–36, changing what had been an L-shaped building to a roughly U-shaped one. The building has nine floors plus a basement. The 4th through 9th floors were used almost exclusively as warehouse space, while most portions of the 2nd and 3rd floors functioned as office and mail-order workspace. The first floor was used primarily for loading and unloading of freight arriving and leaving by truck or rail and temporary storage of such goods. Three rail spurs served the facility, extending into the ground floor. Among other things, the building is known for its large steel-framed roof sign, the largest sign in Portland, which was constructed in 1925.

=== Retail store ===
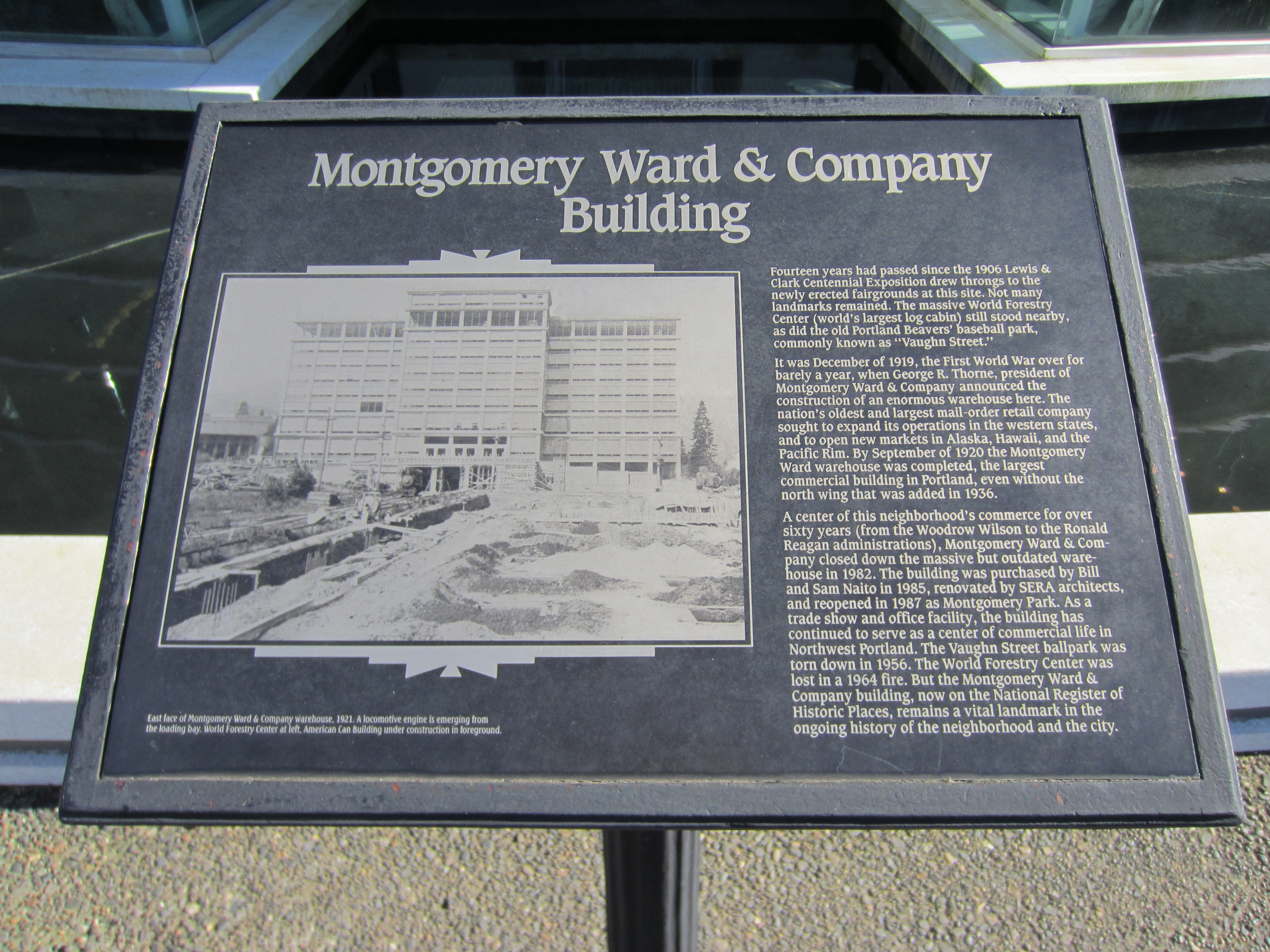
Historical plaque

Retail service at this location was relatively limited in its first years. A 1936 expansion added retail space, covering a variety of goods, occupying a new mezzanine floor and parts of the 2nd and 3rd floors. A tire store was opened in an adjacent annex. In the post-World War II years, the Vaughn Street store's business declined steadily. An increasing proportion of the store's customers were attracted to new suburban shopping malls, and in the early 1970s Montgomery Ward began to follow the same path itself, opening stores at Mall 205 and Jantzen Beach Mall, along with a stand-alone store in Beaverton. The Northwest Portland store closed in July 1976, and the building remained in use only for warehouse and mail-order functions and as a "catalog overstock outlet". In 1978, the company built a new warehouse in Portland's Rivergate Industrial District, and in 1982 it closed the Northwest Portland warehouse, eliminating 500 jobs at the site. Only the small "clearance outlet" store continued to operate, and following the 1984 sale of the building, that store closed finally in July 1985.

== Renovation ==
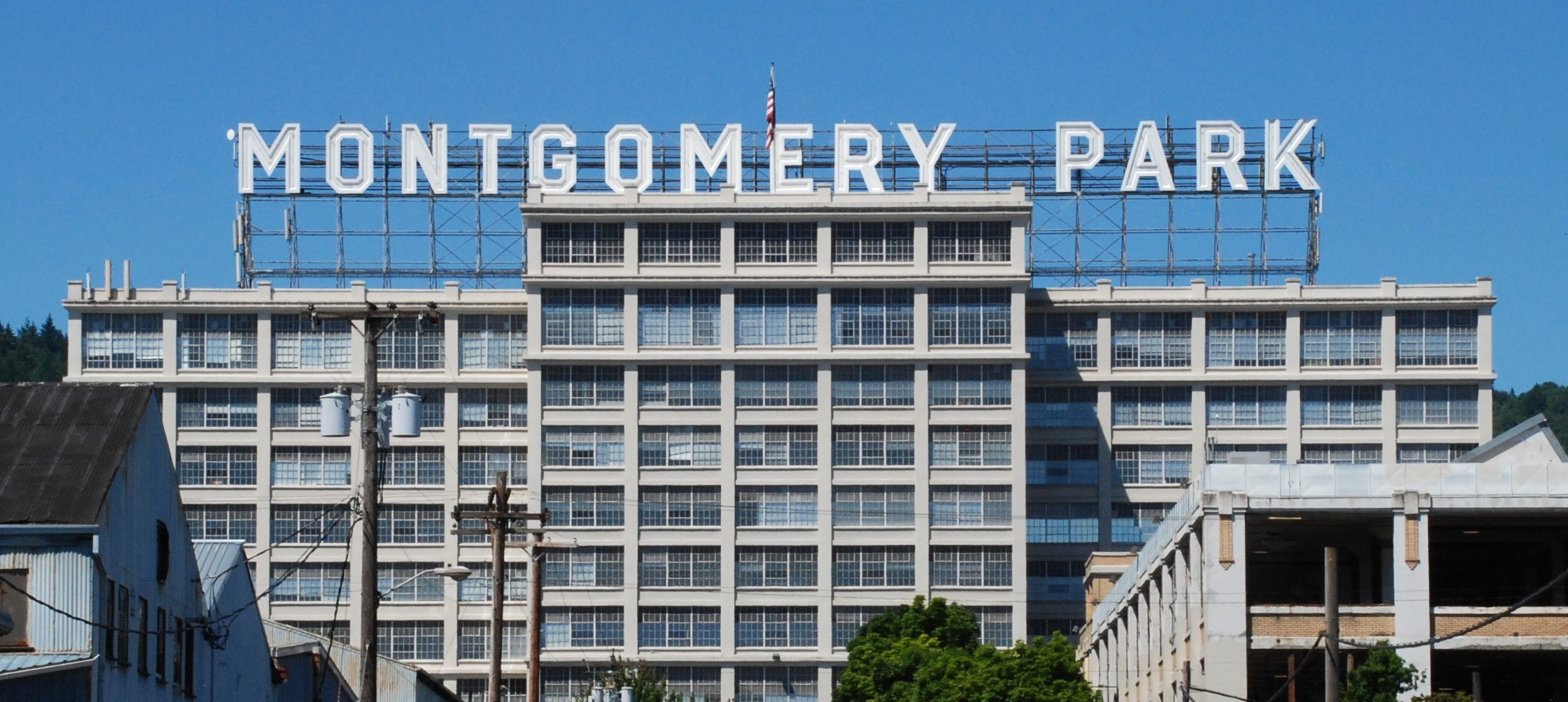
Only two letters of the large rooftop neon sign had to be altered when the building was renamed from Montgomery Ward to Montgomery Park.

In 1984, the building was acquired by the Norcrest China Company, a Portland property development company owned by Bill Naito and his brother Sam Naito. In 1985, the Naitos initiated a rehabilitation and refitting of the building's interior for use for trade shows, banquets and offices. As part of the renovations, the building was renamed "Montgomery Park". The "notoriously frugal" Bill Naito liked the new name, because it meant that only the "W" and "D" of "Ward" in the huge 14-letter neon rooftop sign needed to be altered, with "P" and "K" letters. The sign was changed in May 1986, at which time most of the renovations also were completed and the building opened for regular use for trade shows, among other uses.

== Foreclosure ==
A lender initiated foreclosure proceedings on a loan tied to the Montgomery Park office complex, owned by Unico Properties. The borrowers owed nearly $150 million, according to a paperwork filed with Multnomah County Recorder’s Office on September 29, 2023.

In August 2024, Montgomery Park was sold for $33 million to Menashe Properties, a family-owned real estate firm. The Menashe family has acquired several other buildings in Portland, including the J. K. Gill Company Building and the historic Portland American Bank Building, taking advantage of reduced prices amid challenges in the city's commercial property market.

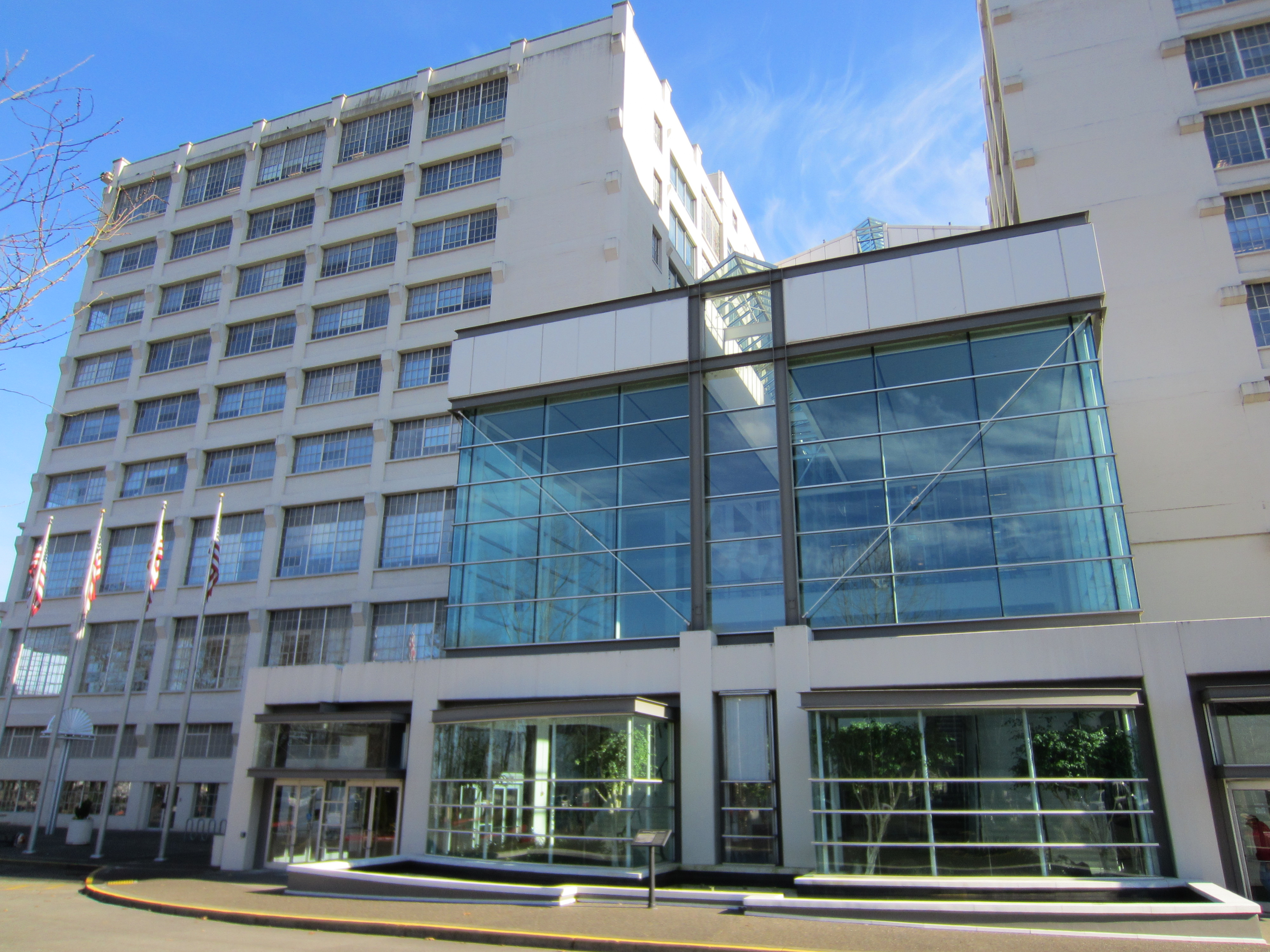
Entrance in 2012, on building's west side

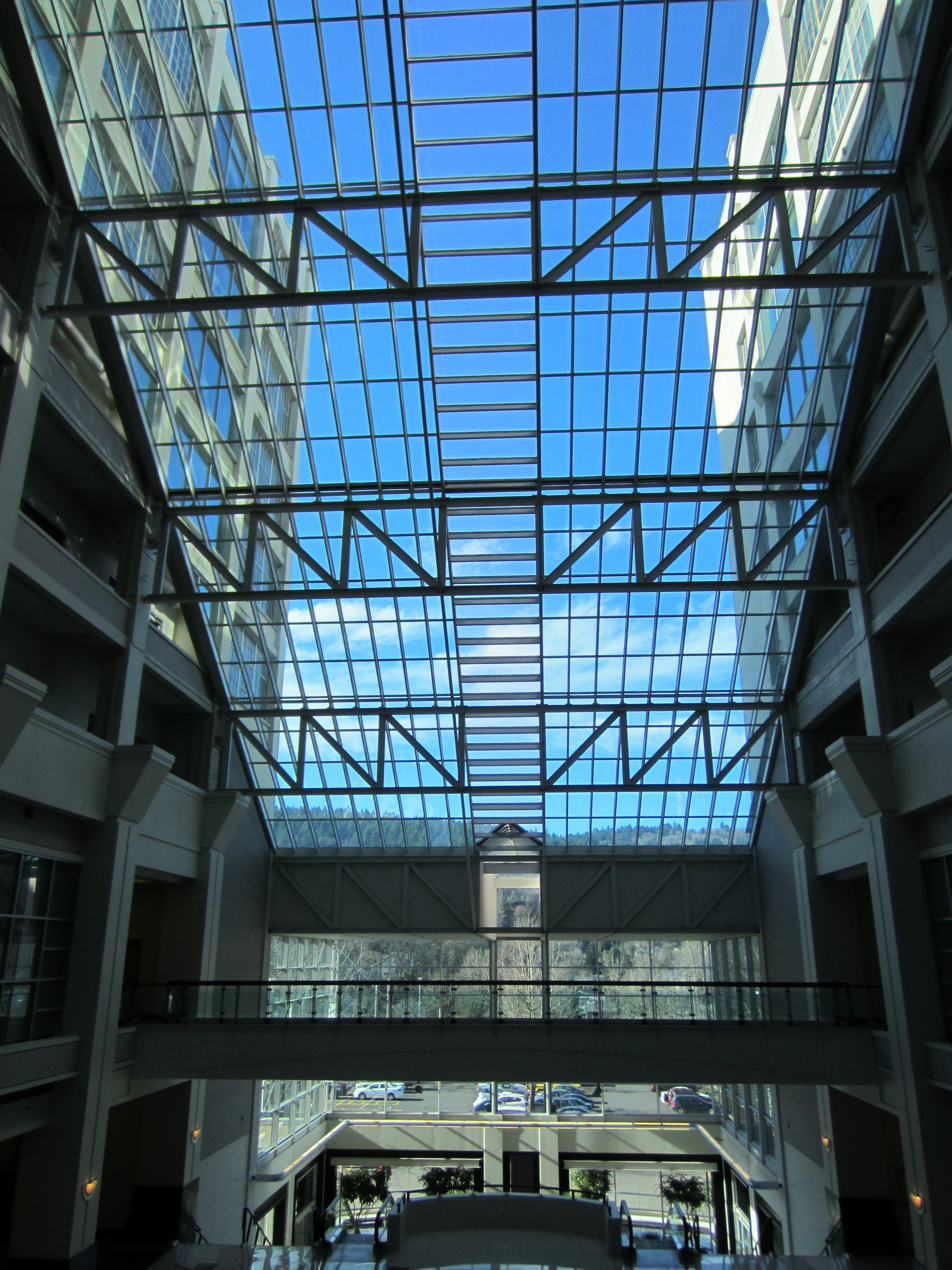
Windows above central atrium

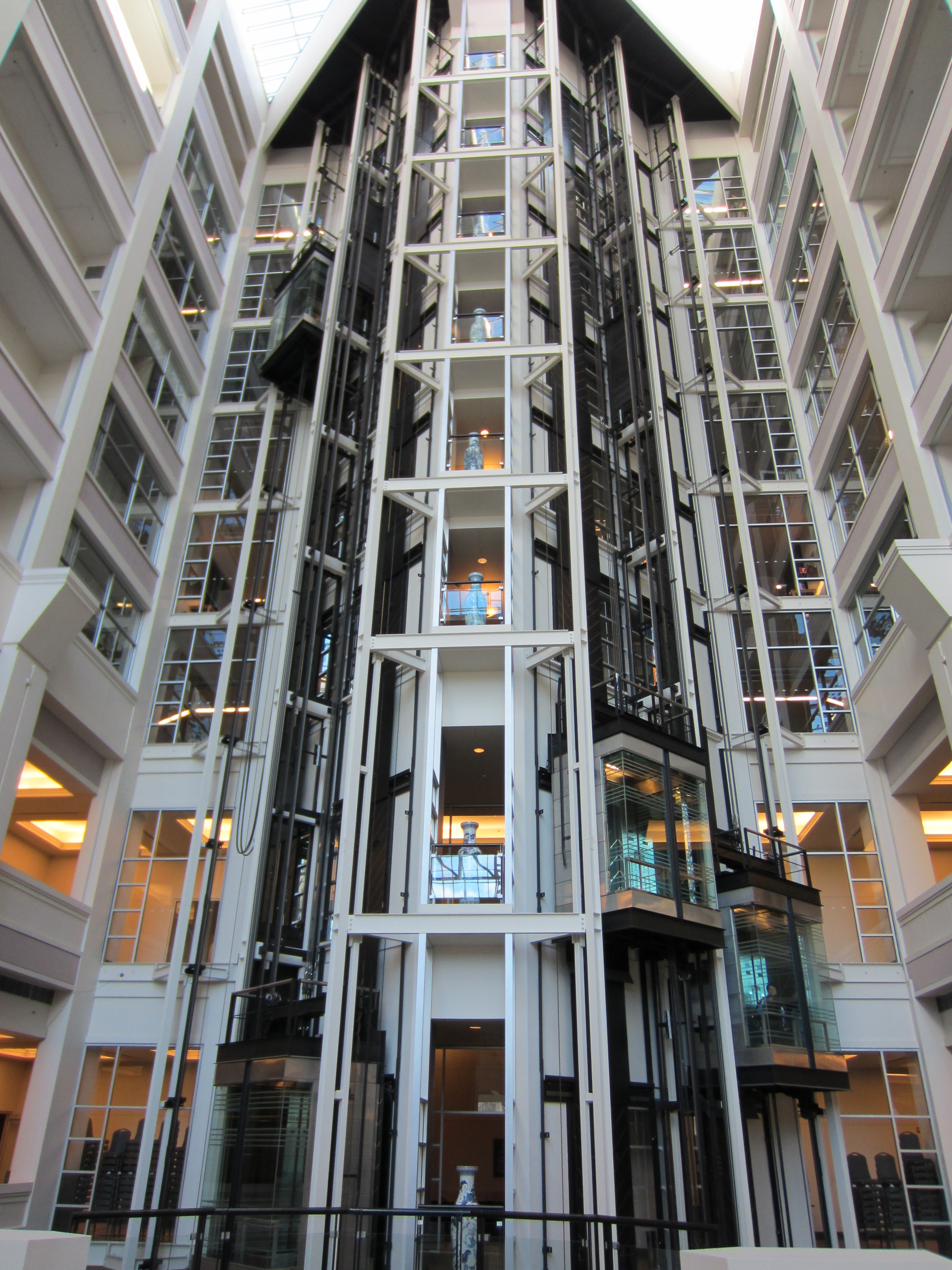
Elevator bank

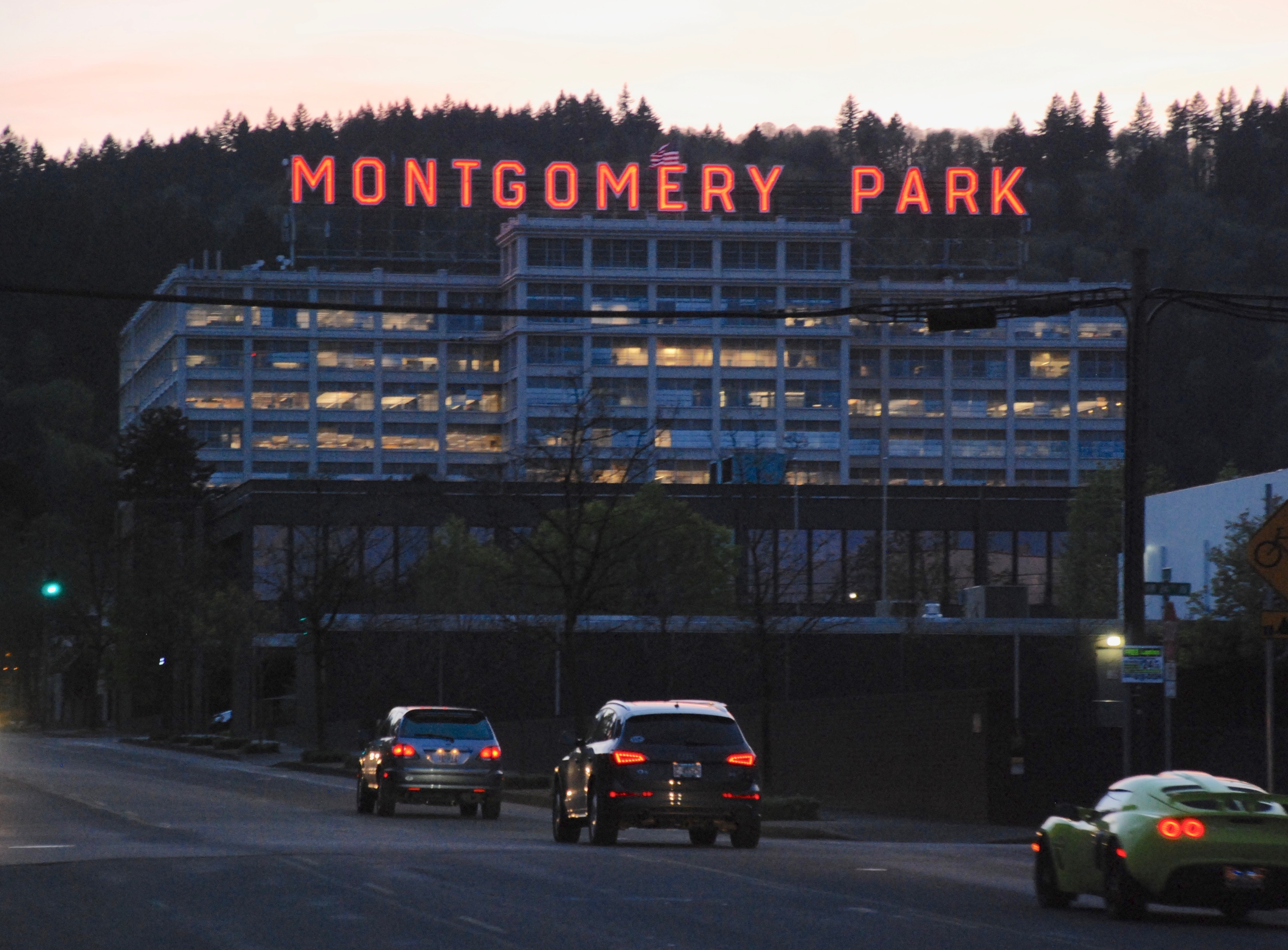
The large rooftop sign, which is white in daylight, glows in red neon at night.

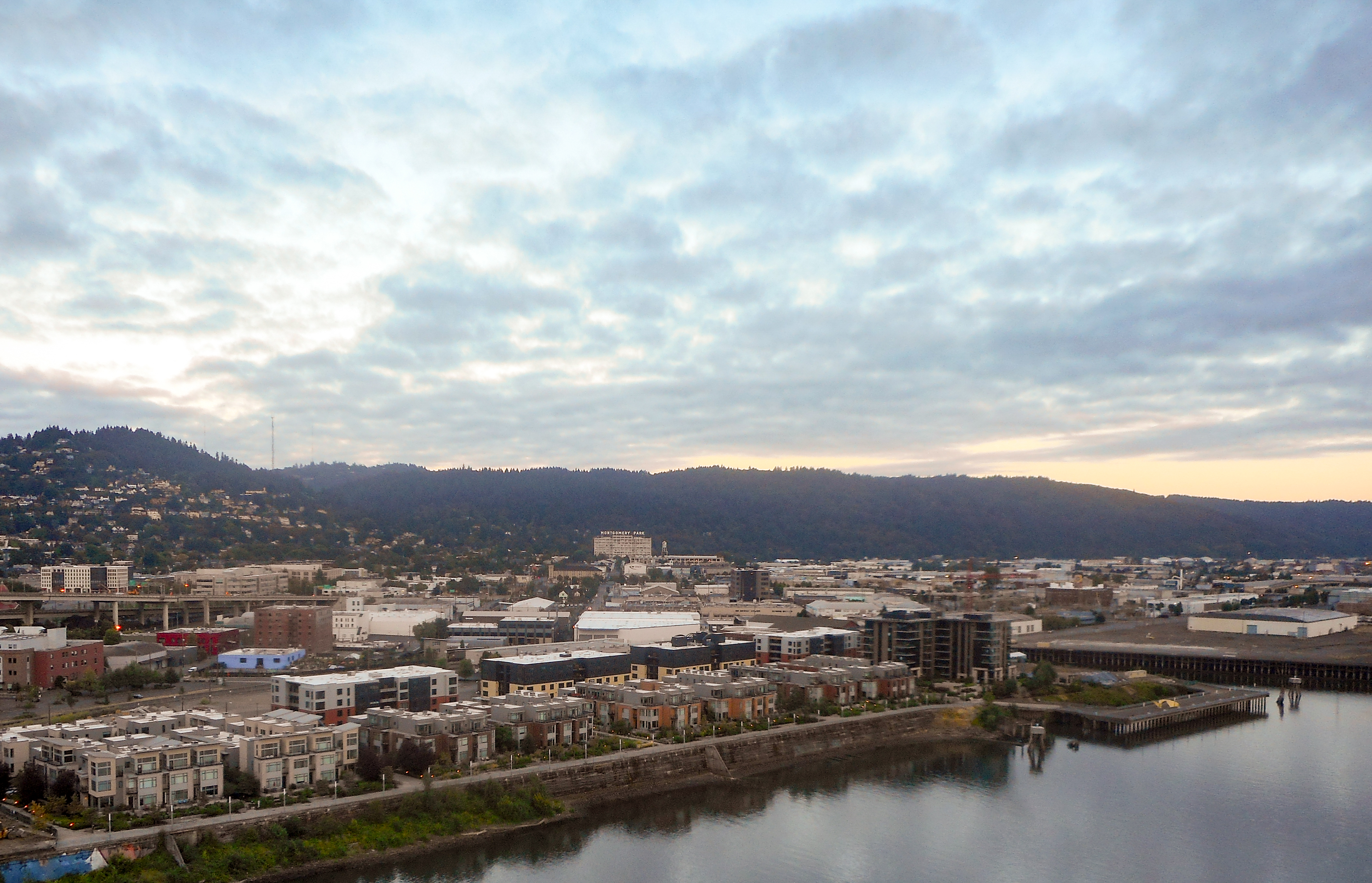
View from Fremont Bridge with Tualatin Mountains and Forest Park in distance

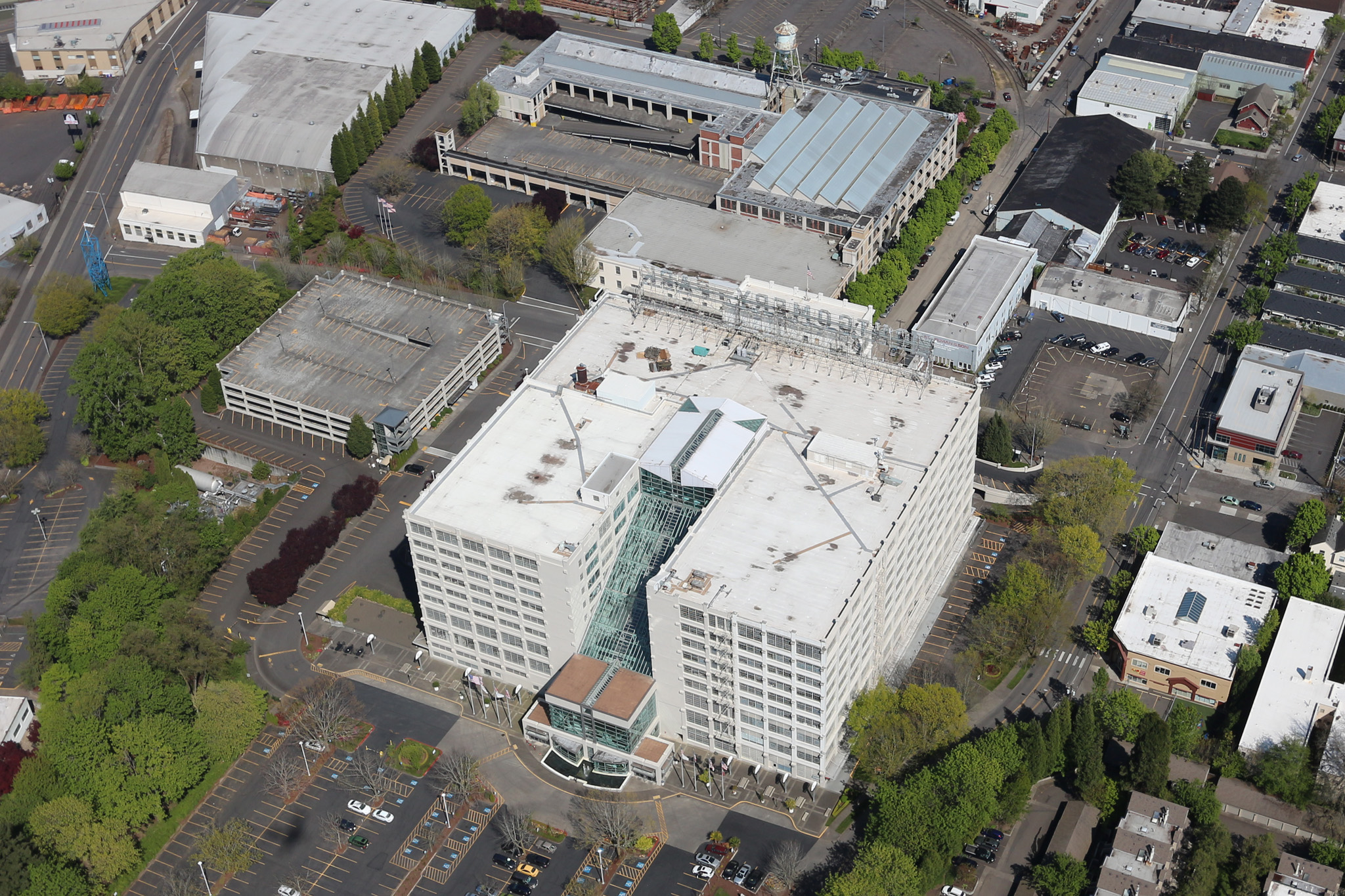
Aerial view from the west-southwest

== See also ==
- National Register of Historic Places listings in Northwest Portland, Oregon
