= Meier & Frank Warehouse =

Historic building in Portland, Oregon, U.S.

- U.S. National Register of Historic Places
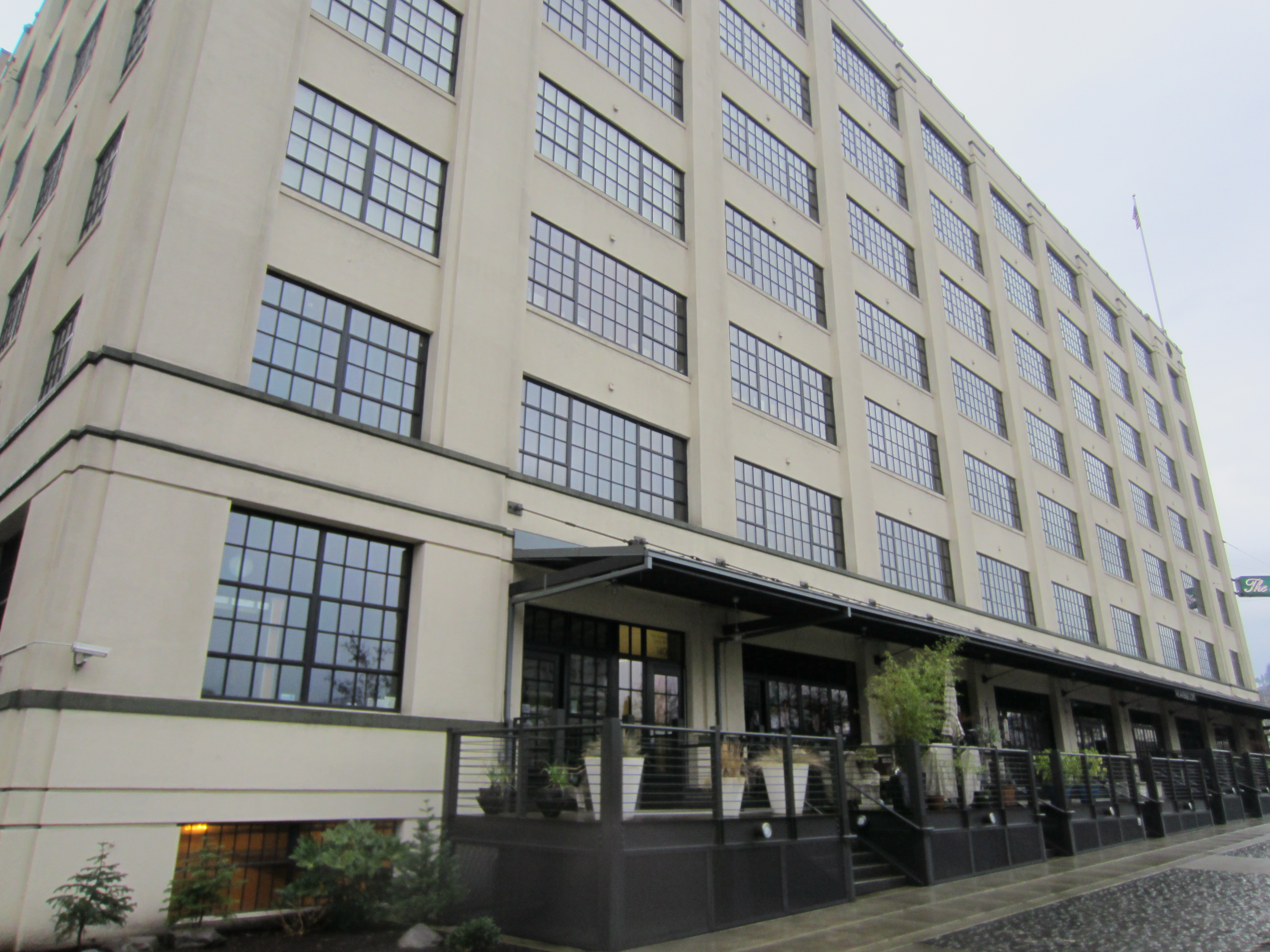
- Meier & Frank Warehouse building in 2012
- Location: 1438 NW Irving Street; Portland, Oregon
- Coordinates: 45°31′39″N 122°41′09″W
- Built: 1923
- Architect: Sutton & Whitney
- Architectural style: Modern Movement
- NRHP reference No.: 00001021
- Added to NRHP: August 31, 2000

The Meier & Frank Warehouse, located in northwest Portland, Oregon, is listed on the National Register of Historic Places. Designed by Sutton & Whitney and built in 1923 for longtime Portland-based retail company Meier & Frank, it was added to the National Register in 2000.

== See also ==
- Meier & Frank Delivery Depot
- National Register of Historic Places listings in Northwest Portland, Oregon
