= Weatherly Building =

Building in Portland, Oregon, U.S.

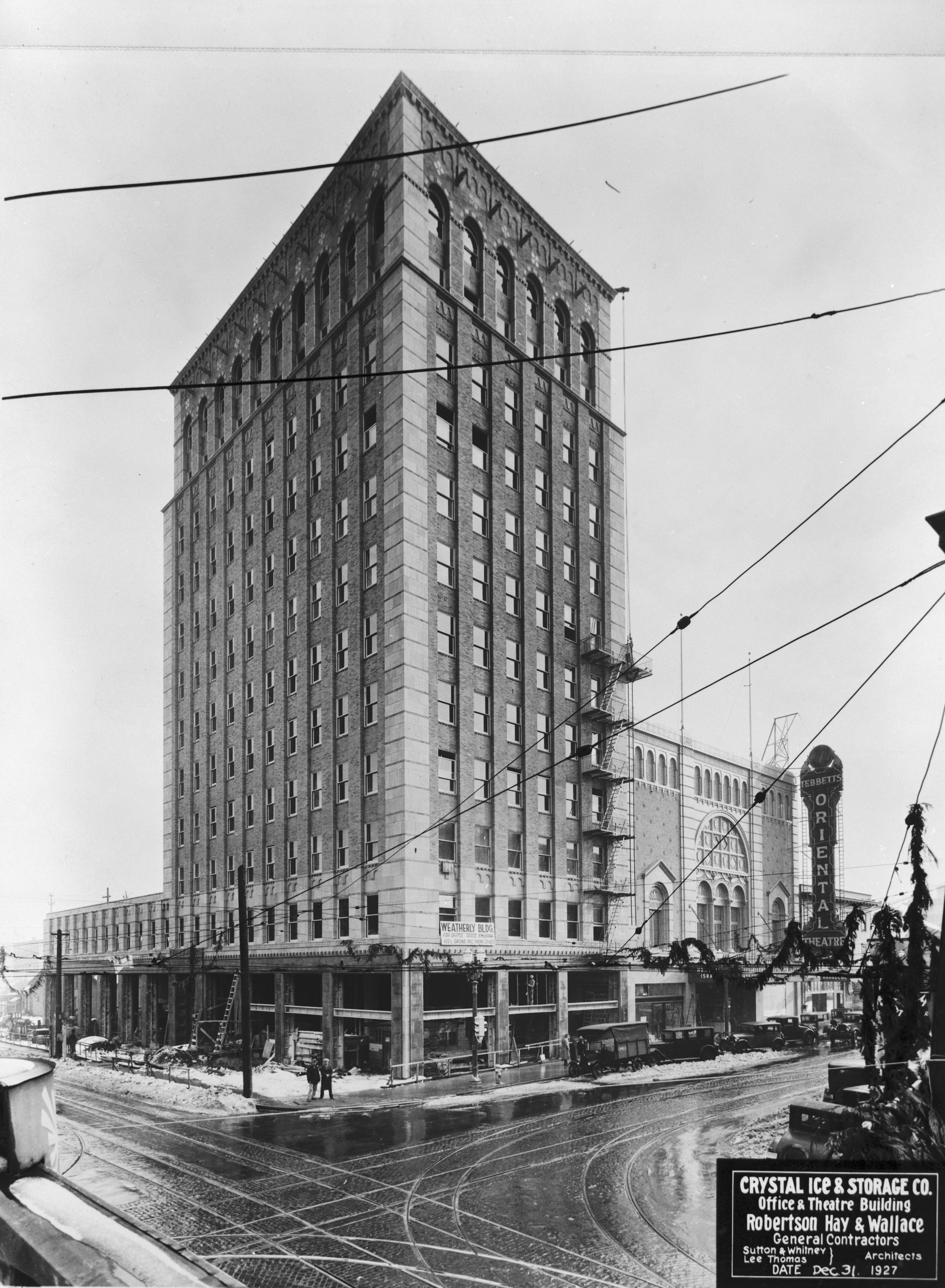
- Weatherly Building and Oriental Theatre on December 31, 1927, when the Weatherly was still under construction

- Location within Portland, Oregon
- Former names: Crystal Ice & Storage Co. Office & Theatre building, The Weatherly

General information
- Type: Highrise
- Architectural style: Beaux-Arts, modern
- Location: Portland, Oregon, 516 SE Morrison Street
- Current tenants: Bank of America, Lensbaby
- Construction started: 1927
- Completed: 1928
- Cost: 1.5 million USD (including theatre)
- Client: George Warren Weatherly
- Owner: Mayfield Investment Company
- Landlord: Mayfield Investment

Height
- Height: 53.34 metres (175.0 ft)

Technical details
- Floor count: 12
- Floor area: 82,000 square feet (7,600 m^{2})
- Weatherly Building
- U.S. Historic district – Contributing property
- Coordinates: 45°31′1.2″N 122°39′37.37″W
- Built: 1928
- Architect: Sutton & Whitney.
- Architectural style: Modern Movement, Romanesque
- Part of: East Portland Grand Avenue Historic District (ID91000126)
- Designated CP: March 4, 1991

Design and construction
- Main contractor: Robertson Hay & Wallace

The Weatherly Building in Portland, Oregon, is a 12-story commercial office building. It was built in 1927–28 by ice cream businessman George Warren Weatherly.

According to a photograph dated December 21, 1927, held by the Library of Congress as part of the Historic American Buildings Survey collection (labeled "Stevens Commercial Photographers"), the building was designed by architects Sutton & Whitney and Lee Thomas, and was built by Robertson Hay & Wallace general contractors. It is listed as a secondary contributing property in the East Portland Grand Avenue Historic District.

== Background ==
Weatherly's creamery business started with a second-hand freezer in a small candy shop in 1890 and grew to produce an estimated 90% of Oregon ice cream sales. He was "locally credited" with inventing the ice cream cone and to have been the "east side's leading citizen in the 1920 and 1930s". The building helped develop the so-called "uptown district" and had an ice cream shop on its ground floor. An employee of Weatherly's, F. A. Bruckman, invented and patented the first successful cone manufacturing machine.

== Architecture ==
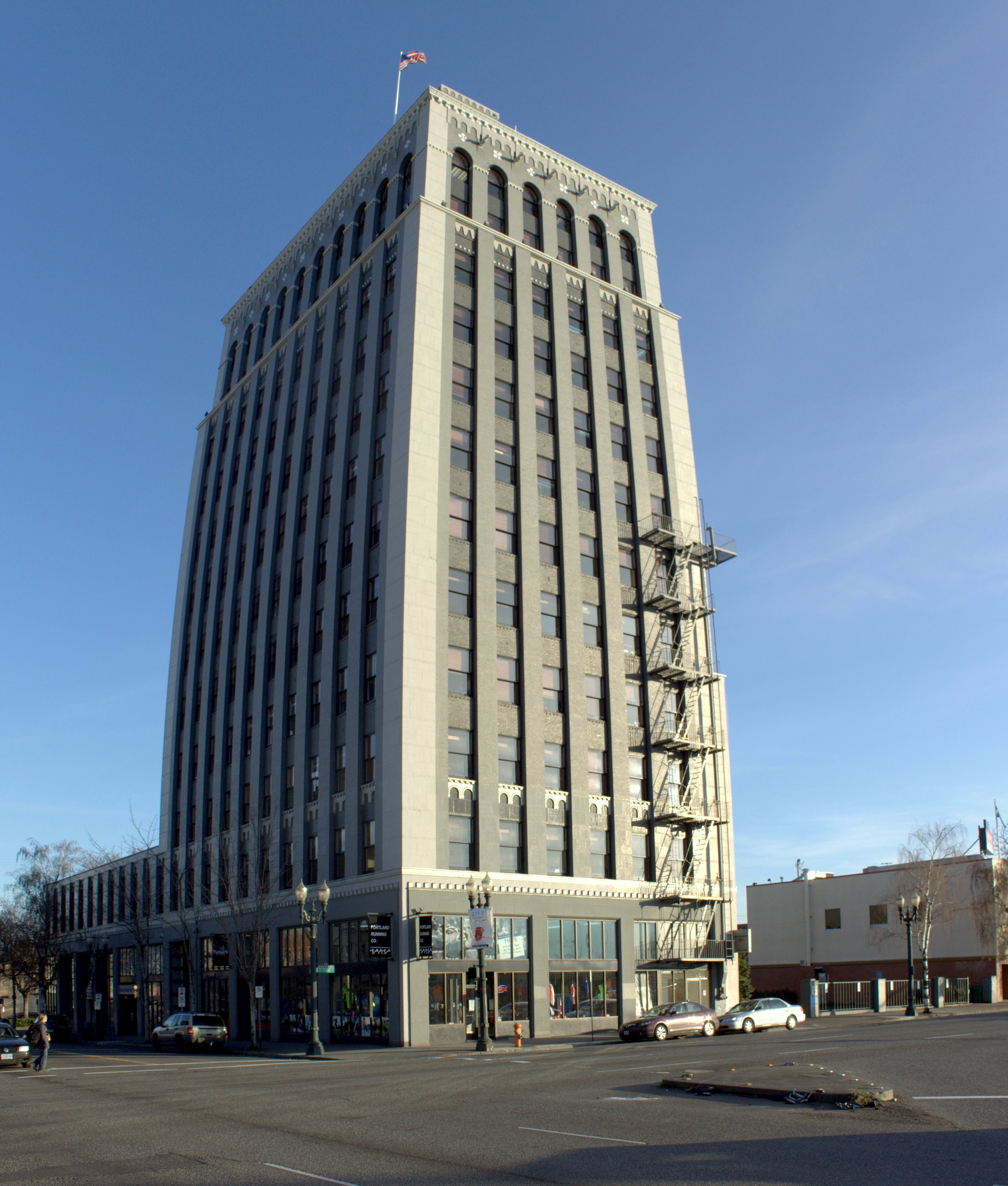
The Weatherly Building in 2009, from the northwest

The Weatherly building has Romanesque brick and terra cotta embellishments, including an arcade of arches near the roof. It "was among the first high-rise buildings east of the river, with 12 stories towering over the Morrison Bridge." There are 3 elevators and two rooftop penthouses.

Movie theatre operator Walter Eugene Tebetts convinced Weatherly to construct the Oriental Theatre adjacent to the Weatherly building. It was designed by Lee Thomas and Albert Mercier, who also designed many other movie palaces in the Pacific Northwest. The large and ornate theatre was the area's second largest, behind the Portland Theatre. It was torn down in 1970 to make way for a parking lot. The building and theatre cost $1.5 million.

== Ownership and occupants ==
The Weatherly sold in 2002 to Mayfield Investment in Palo Alto, California for $7.4 million. It was previously owned by Landmark Investments, who owned it since 1984.

Tenants of the Weatherly have included Burns Bros. Inc., Kerr Violin Shop, Bank of America, Aqua Terra couples massage, Grand Jete Café, the Portland Running Company, Lensbaby, Stand for Children, Archscape Architecture.
