= Neighbors of Woodcraft =

The Neighbors of Woodcraft were a fraternal benefit society that originated as a splinter of the female auxiliary of the Woodmen of the World.

== History ==
The origins of the society go back to the Supreme Session of the Woodmen Circle in 1897 when delegates from nine western states led by Mrs. C. C. Van Ornsdall passed a resolution to secede from the parent order and form the Pacific Circle, Women of Woodcraft. The group was headquartered in Leadville, Colorado, but moved to Portland, Oregon in 1905, where it remained through the 1970s. The Neighbors of Woodcraft merged into the Woodmen of the World in July 2001.

== Organization ==
Local units were called "Circles", regional areas were "District Circles" and the "Grand Circle" was the national authority. Circle officers included the Guardian neighbor, Past Guardian Neighbor, Adviser, Magician, Clerk, Banker, Attendant, Captain of Guards, Flag, Bearer, Musician, Inner Sentinel, Out Sentinel, three Managers, Correspondent and Senior Guardian.

== Membership ==
In 1979 the Neighbors had no less than five categories of membership: benefit, social, junior benefit, junior social and family affiliate. Benefit members contributed to the Benefit Fund and were insured by the order. Social members, like social members in other groups, did not contribute to the benefit fund and ordinarily unable to hold office. Junior beneficial and social memberships was much like the adult counterparts, other than the fact that they needed their parents permission. family affiliates were children who were insured under a family rider plan. In 1927 there were 77,000 members, but this had declined to 25,000.

== Ritual ==
The Neighbors of Woodcraft had a ritual which included annual passwords, initiation rites and a ritual obligation. Once each year each member was required to reaffirm their obligation on "Obligation Night".

== Benefits and philanthropy ==
Aside from insurance programs, the NOW also operated a home for its aged members, Woodcraft Home. This Home was originally based in Riverside, California, but moved to Hood River, Oregon in 1952. There was also a Grand Circle Scholarship Program open to sons, daughters or grandchildren of members.

== See also ==
- Neighbors of Woodcraft Building
- Royal Neighbors of America, another fraternal benefit society that originated as the female auxiliary of a Woodmen group.
