= J. K. Gill Company Building =

Historic building in Portland, Oregon, U.S.

- U.S. National Register of Historic Places
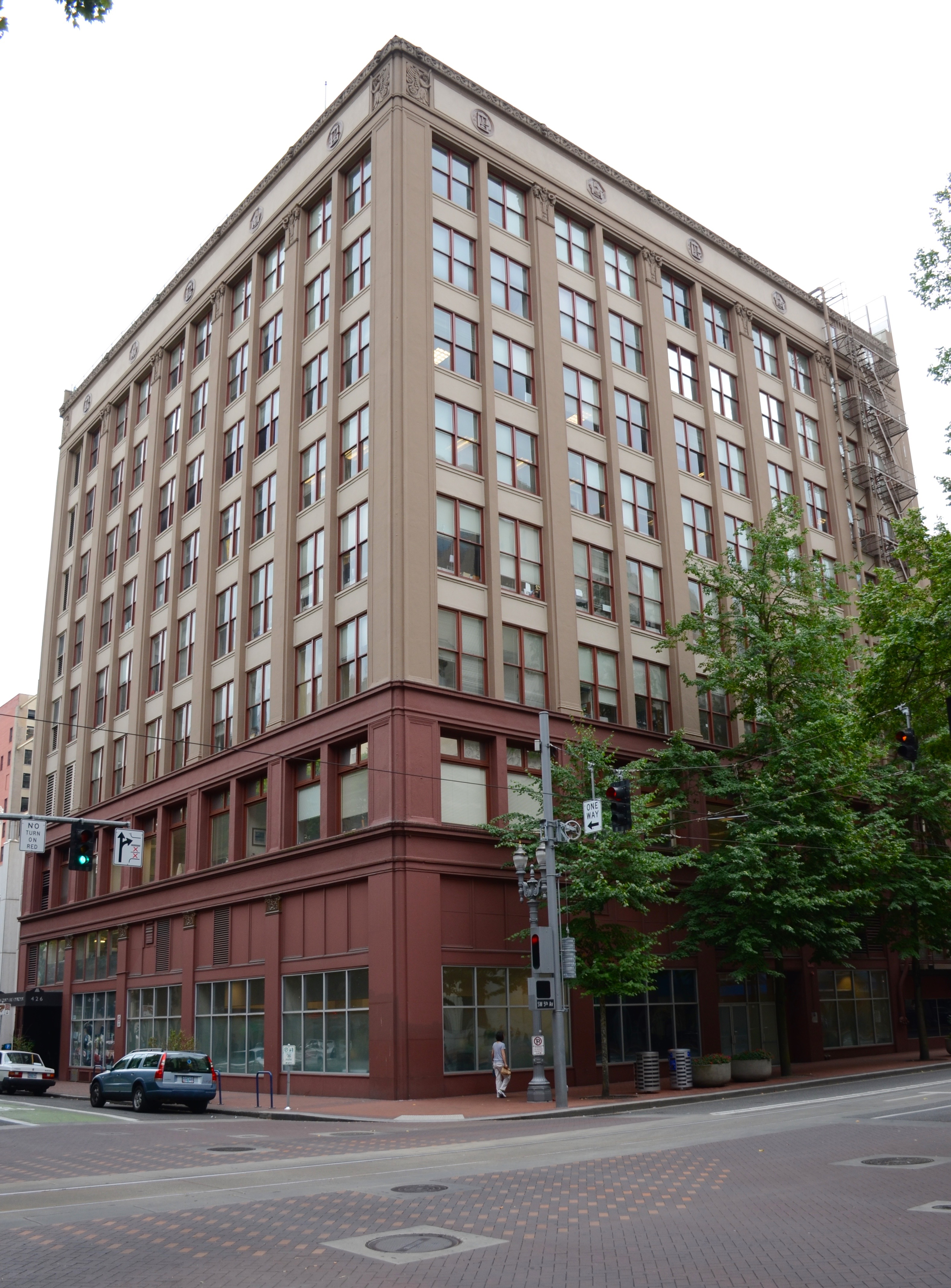
- The building's exterior in 2015

- Location within Portland, Oregon Location within Oregon Location within the United States
- Location: 408 SW 5th Avenue; Portland, Oregon
- Coordinates: 45°31′14″N 122°40′35″W
- Built: 1922
- Architect: Sutton & Whitney
- Architectural style: Commercial (Chicago school)
- NRHP reference No.: 100006186
- Added to NRHP: February 23, 2021

The J. K. Gill Company Building is an historic building located at 5th and Stark in downtown Portland, Oregon.

== History ==
It was originally constructed in 1922 to serve as the headquarters and flagship store for the J. K. Gill Company, a office supply and bookstore chain in the Pacific Northwest. The eight-story building was designed by the architectural firm Sutton & Whitney.

The structure once served as the J. K. Gill Company's flagship store. It was added to the National Register of Historic Places in February 2021.

In July 2024, Menashe Properties purchased the 90,000-square-foot building for $3.25 million after it had undergone renovations but struggled to attract tenants.

== See also ==
- National Register of Historic Places listings in South and Southwest Portland, Oregon
