= J. K. Gill Company =

American office supply business

J. K. Gill

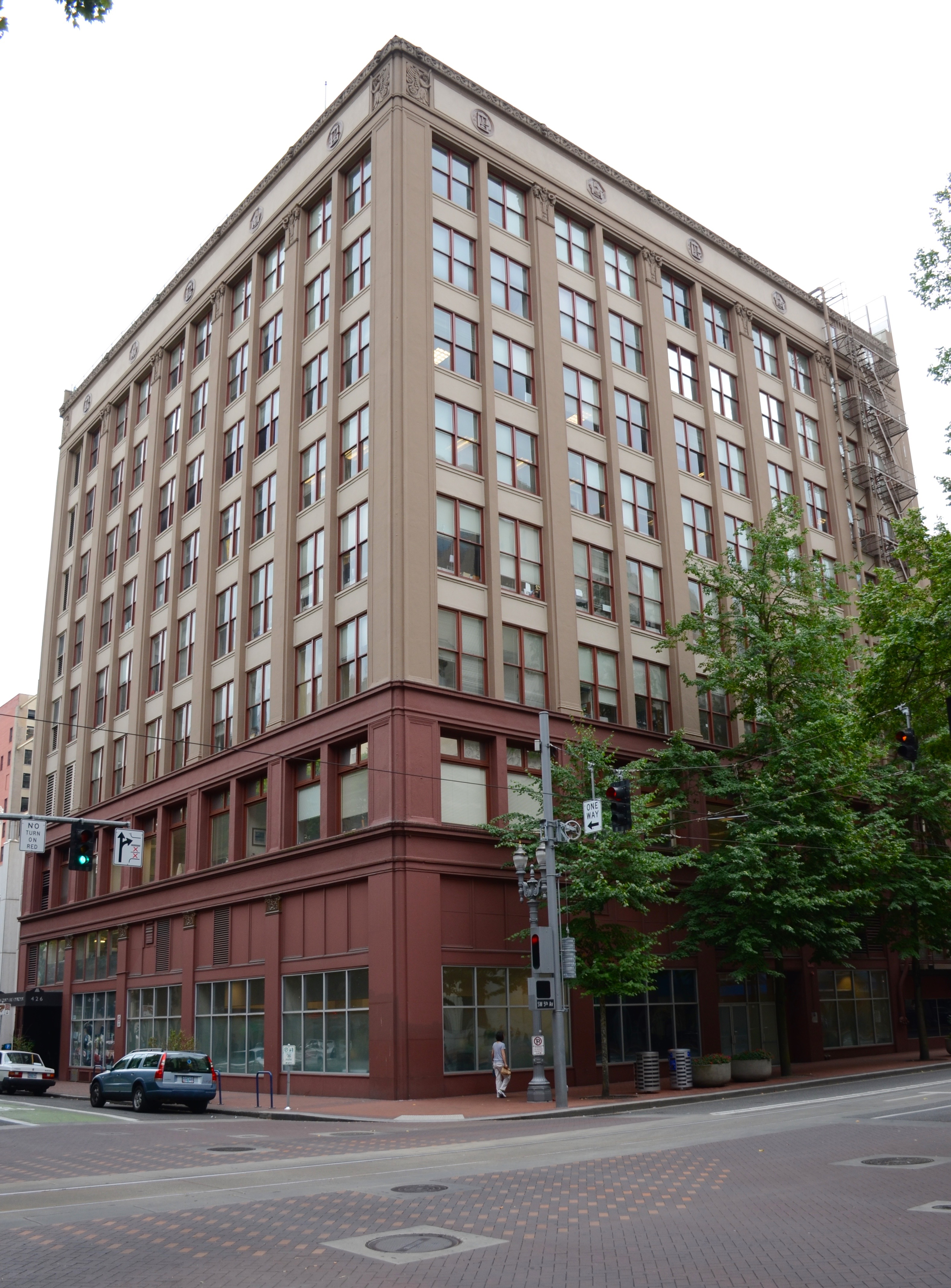
- The J. K. Gill Company Building in 2015
- Formerly: Gill and Steel, Gill and Yeaton
- Type: Private
- Industry: Publishing, Office supplies, books and school supplies
- Founded: 1867
- Founder: Joseph K. Gill
- Defunct: 1999
- Headquarters: Portland, Oregon, United States
- Number of employees: 500 (1980)

The J.K. Gill Company, also known as J.K. Gill and Gill's, was an office supply company, based in Portland, Oregon. Specializing in books and school supplies, the company was in business for over 130 years, mainly in Oregon and Washington. At its peak, the company had over 500 employees and operated retail stores in those two states and California and Arizona.

== History ==
While teaching in 1866 at Willamette University under the supervision of Thomas Milton Gatch, recent graduate Joseph K. Gill purchased a school supply company in Salem, Oregon, and opened a small bookstore there in 1867. In 1868, Gill built a new, larger store with partner C.F. Yeaton in Salem, and in 1870 he sold his business to Yeaton and moved to Portland. There he formed a partnership with George A. Steel and purchased the Harris and Holeman stationery store at the corner of Front and Washington Streets (the Parrish Building). In February 1872, the company acquired W. T. Shanahan's music store and relocated to the Holmes Building on 1st Street (now 417 SW First Ave.). The move was strategic, as it positioned the company near the Ladd and Tilton Bank at First and Stark. Alongside their existing range of books, stationery, and office supplies, the company also began to sell pianos and organs. After Steel's departure in May 1873 with the music business, the firm was rebranded as J.K. Gill and Company. The company briefly split its wholesale and retail operations, remaining at First and Oak under the name W.B. Ayer and Co. and opening the J.K. Gill wholesale warehouse near the Skidmore Fountain. In 1888 the two branches of the company were reunited under the name J.K. Gill, and in 1893 the company moved to the former Masonic Lodge at Third and Alder.

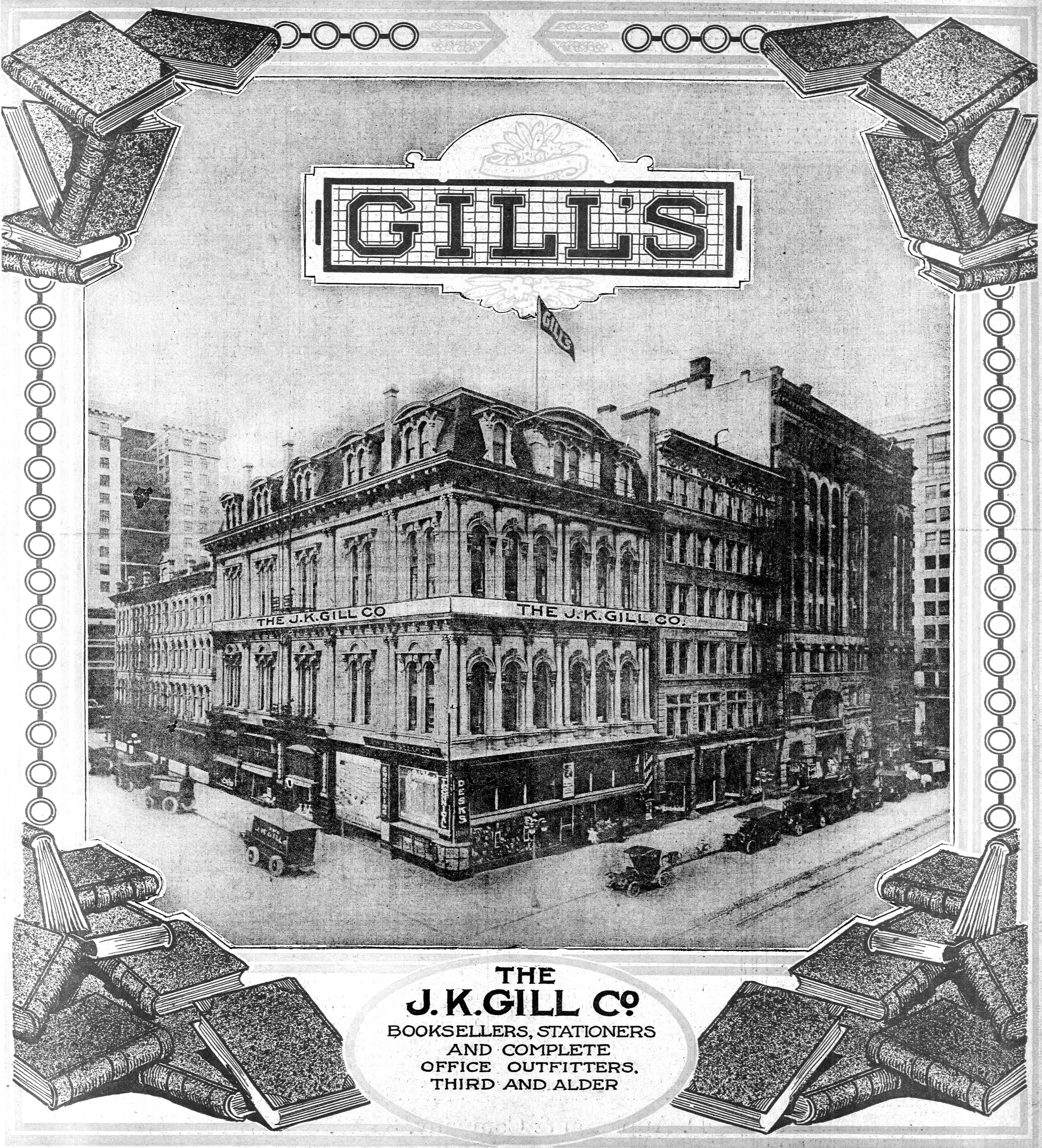
A 1914 newspaper advertisement for the J.K. Gill Co., depicting the 1893 store

In 1922, J.K. Gill began construction of a new headquarters at Fifth and Stark under the direction of architects Sutton & Whitney. Estimated cost of the eight-story building was $300,000, and total cost including land and furnishings was about $600,000. At that time, J.K. Gill was considered the largest distributor of books in the Pacific Northwest and the largest business of its kind in any city in the United States the size of Portland.

From at least the 1880s, publication of books, lithographs, and maps was also part of the business. Gill's Dictionary of the Chinook Jargon was a standard reference for trappers and traders doing business among the Chinook people.

After the death of founder Joseph K. Gill in 1931, the company continued to grow. In the 1960s a shift away from downtown stores began, and by 1990 the chain's stores were located mostly in shopping malls.

In 1970, the Gill family sold the firm to Young & Rubicam. At that time, there were 11 J.K Gill stores in Oregon and Washington and $13.8 million in annual sales. Young & Rubicam expanded the business, and by 1979 there were 36 stores in three states and annual sales exceeded $40 million (equivalent to $177 million in 2025). J.K. Gill was acquired by Bro-Dart Industries in September 1980, becoming a subsidiary of that company. At the time, the company employed about 500 people and its total of 36 stores comprised 27 in Oregon and Washington, and nine in California. By early 1984, J.K. Gill had added two stores in Arizona, and had 13 in Oregon, 15 in Washington, and an unspecified number in California.

The company's 8,000-square-foot (740 m^{2}) flagship store in downtown Portland, in the J. K. Gill Company Building at 5th and Stark, closed in 1991. (Multnomah County began leasing space in the J.K. Gill Building in 1978 and purchased the nine-story building in 1988, for use by offices of the county's Health Department.) The building was added to the National Register of Historic Places in February 2021.

In the 1990s, amid increasing competition from larger, national companies, Gill's was forced out of business. Its last stores closed in 1999.

== See also ==
- Stationery
