= Mount Hood Masonic Temple =

Historic building in Portland, Oregon, U.S.

- U.S. National Register of Historic Places
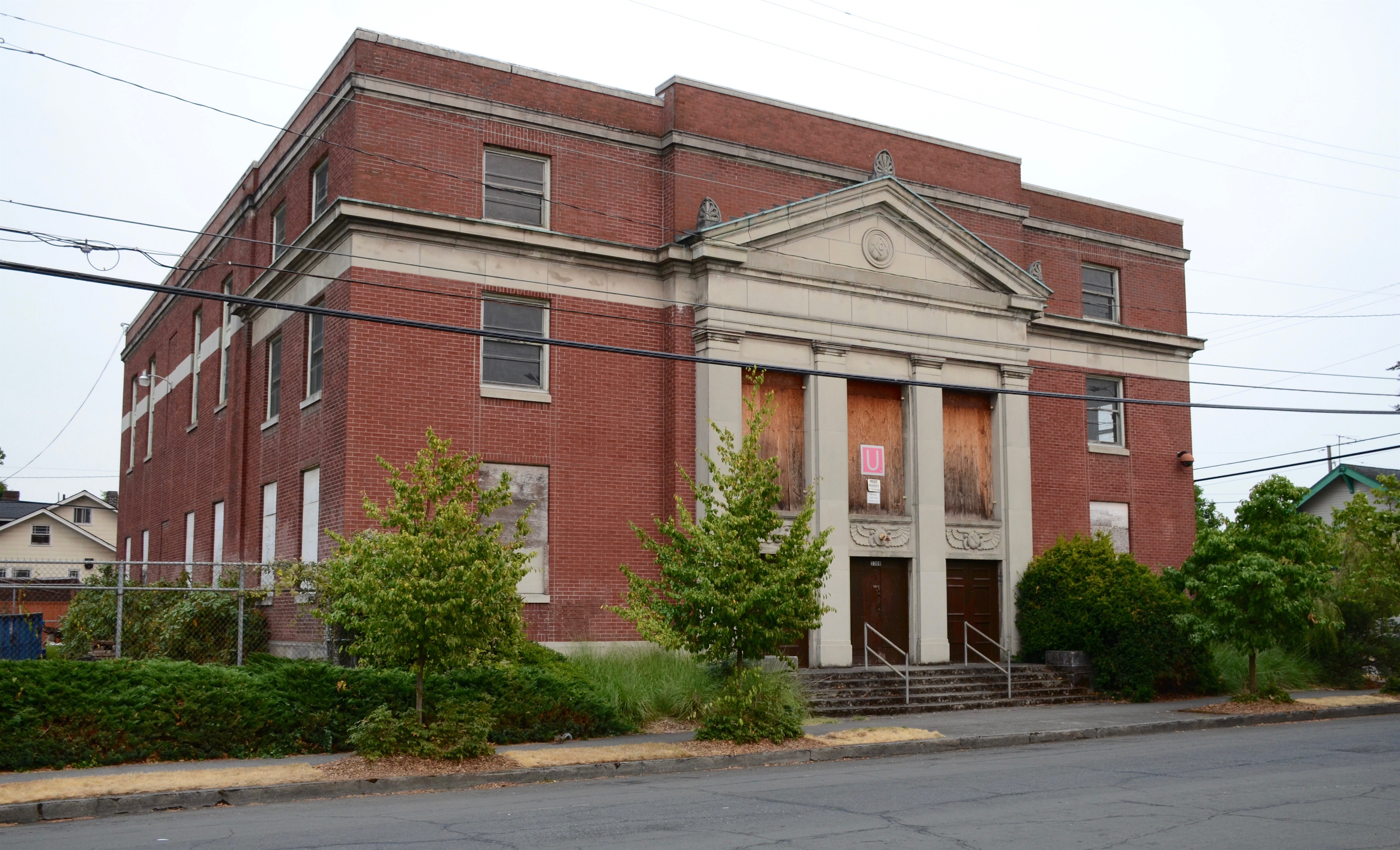
- Main (west) façade in 2017

- Location within Portland, Oregon Location within Oregon Location within the United States
- Location: 5308 N. Commercial Ave., Portland, Oregon
- Coordinates: 45°33′42.7″N 122°40′14.9″W
- Area: 0.5 acres (0.20 ha)
- Built: 1923
- Architect: Sutton & Whitney
- Architectural style: Colonial Revival
- NRHP reference No.: 08000473
- Added to NRHP: May 29, 2008

The Mount Hood Masonic Temple in Portland, Oregon is a Masonic building from 1923. It was listed on the National Register of Historic Places in 2008. Vacant since 1981, it was purchased by the McMenamins brewpub chain in 2007. Plans for renovation of the building were still being formulated in 2012.
