= Ballou & Wright Company Building =

Historic building in Portland, Oregon, U.S.

- U.S. National Register of Historic Places
- Portland Historic Landmark
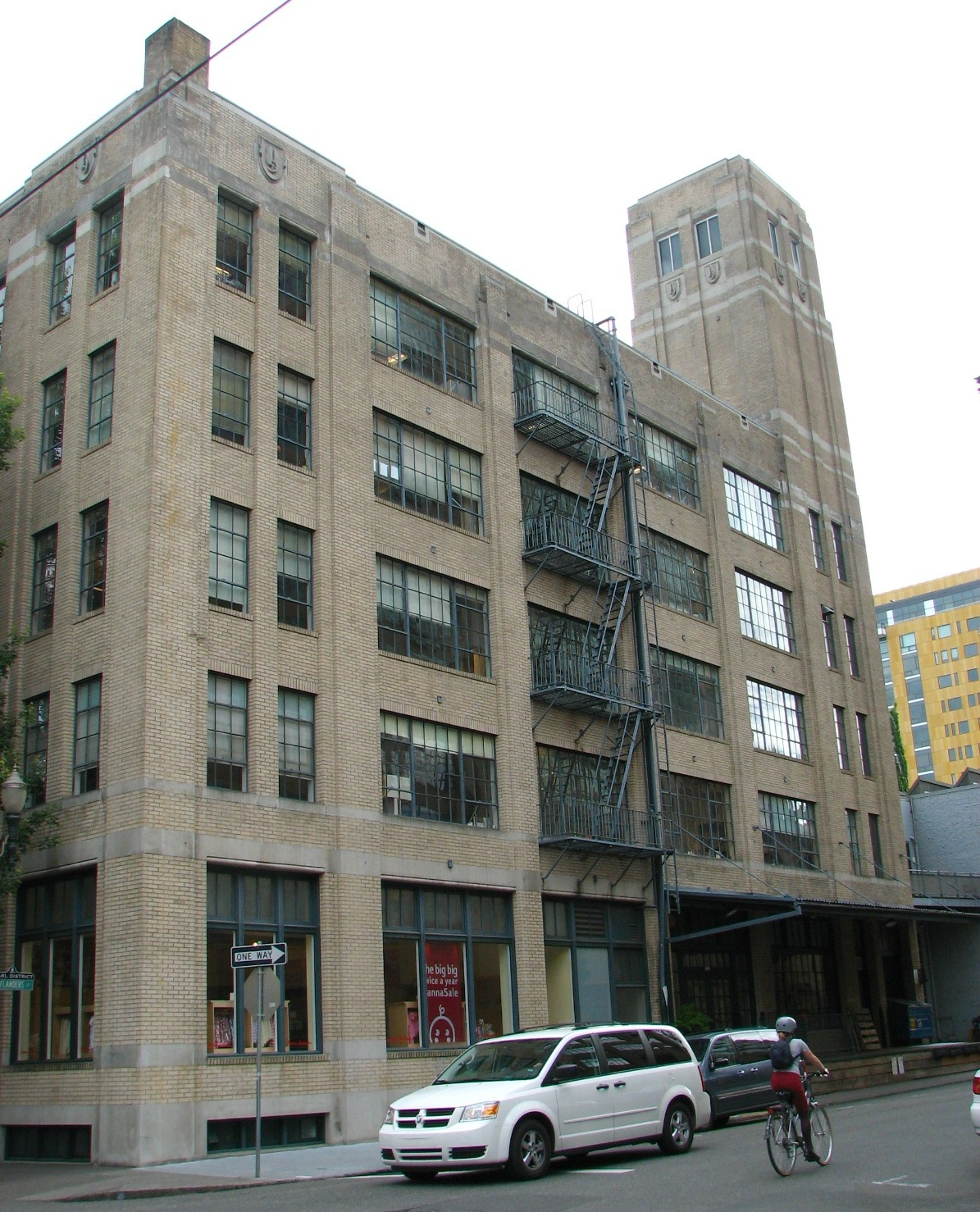
- Ballou & Wright Company Building in 2008

- Location within Portland, Oregon
- Location: 327 NW 10th Avenue; Portland, Oregon
- Coordinates: 45°31′32″N 122°40′54″W
- Area: less than one acre
- Built: 1921
- Architect: Sutton & Whitney
- NRHP reference No.: 87000698
- Added to NRHP: April 30, 1987

The Ballou & Wright Company Building is a historic warehouse building located at 327 NW 10th Avenue in Downtown Portland, Oregon. It was designed by Sutton & Whitney and its construction was completed in 1921, and it was listed on the National Register of Historic Places on April 30, 1987.

== Design Details ==
It is a five-story, reinforced concrete historic warehouse building. It is significant "as one of the best-preserved large-scale, loft-type warehouses in the city; one which is distinguished by the quality of its exterior finish of sand grey brick on street elevations and its detailing in general. The square corner sprinkling tank and elevator tower at the northwest corner of the warehouse, also finely detailed, is a distinguishing and increasingly rare feature locally. Strip pilasters between structural bays are banded with contrasting cast-stone string courses, and the parapet is ornamented with the Ballou & Wright Company's distinctive logogram: an escutcheon displaying a winged wheel."

== Ballou & Wright ==
The Ballou & Wright Company was originally a bicycle dealer in Great Falls, Montana. It was founded by Oscar. B. Ballou (1853–1946), originally from Massachusetts, and Charles F. Wright (1877–1958), originally from Kansas.

They had set up shop in Portland by 1902, and were carrying selling bicycles from lesser known bicycle manufacturers Tribune, Cleveland, Imperial, and others. In 1904 they were carrying bicycles from popular maker Pierce, and by 1905 they had added Rambler models and begun to carry automobile supplies. By 1909 they had begun to sell motorcycles part, and by the following year they had become a west coast distributor for Indian Motorcycles. They took on the Emblem motorcycle distributorship for Oregon and Wasthington (state) in 1913. By 1916 their motorcycle business was big enough that they would receive railroad cars full of new Indian motorcycles - 66 motorcycles in one published case.

The rapid growth of the firm led to Ballou & Wright Company becoming the leading wholesaler of bicycles, motorcycles and automobile parts in the northwest region of the United States. The rapid growth meant the firm outgrew multiple facilities, and eventually to have a large building designed for them in 1917. Likely because of World War I, and the recession after the war, the construction of the building was delayed, and it was not finished until late 1921. On December 30, 1921, they held an open house with over 600 guests attending.

The company eventually grew to have 12 branch offices with locations opening in major cities like Seattle, Washington (1913), Spokane, Washington (1920), and Tacoma, Washington (1936). The firm disbanded in 1960, about two years after the death of Charles Wright. Oscar Ballou had died in 1946.
