= National Bank of Tacoma =

- U.S. National Register of Historic Places
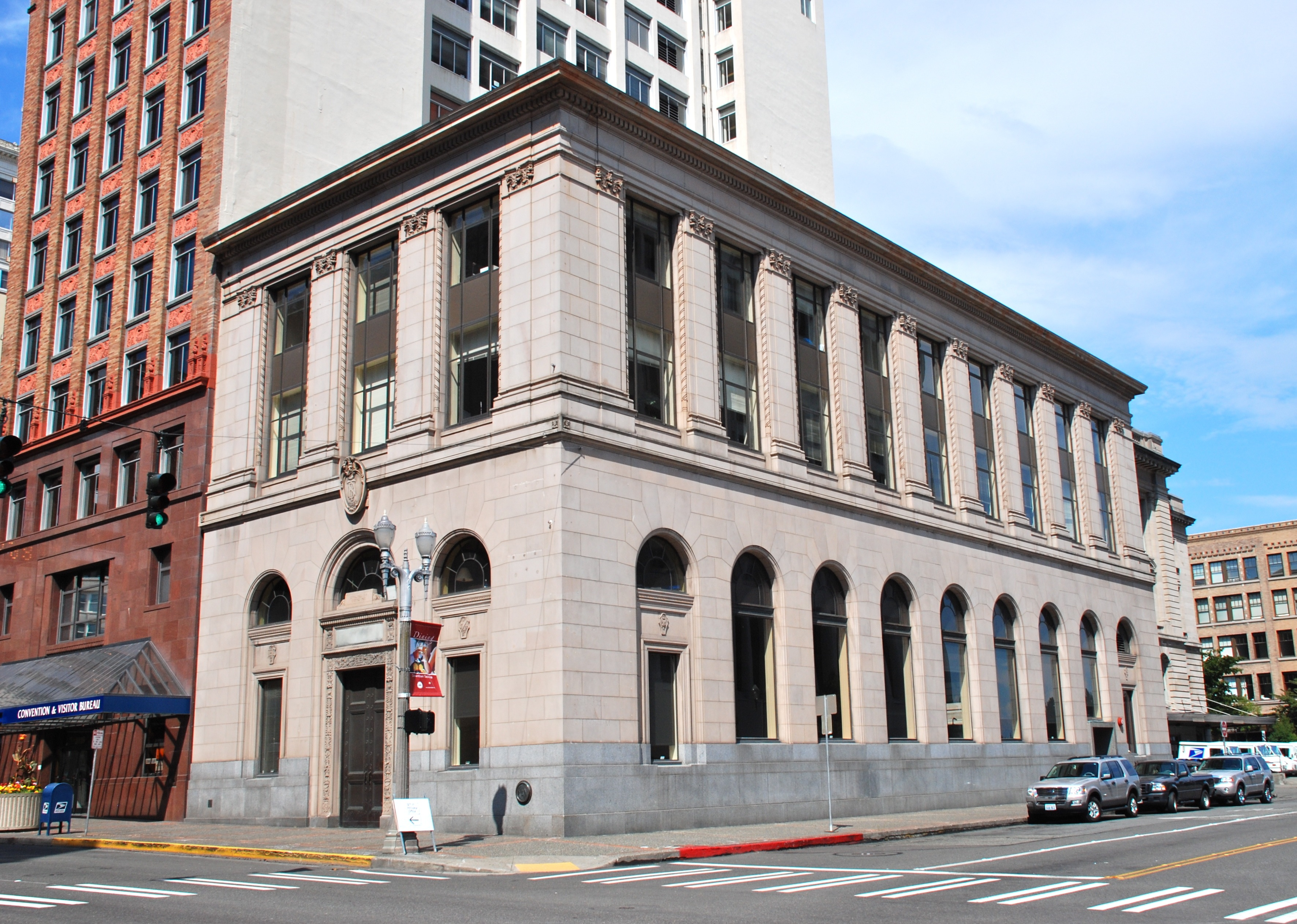
- National Bank of Tacoma Building in 2009

- Location within Washington (state)
- Location: 1123 Pacific Ave., Tacoma, Washington
- Coordinates: 47°15′16″N 122°26′17″W
- Area: less than one acre
- Built: 1920–1921
- Architect: Sutton & Whitney; et al.
- Architectural style: Renaissance
- NRHP reference No.: 06000671
- Added to NRHP: August 2, 2006

The National Bank of Tacoma Building, also known as the National Bank of Washington and as the Tacoma Art Museum, is a former bank building in downtown Tacoma, Washington, United States. It was designed by Sutton & Whitney and built in 1921. It was listed on the National Register of Historic Places in 2006.

The bank changed its name to the National Bank of Washington in 1937. In 1970, the building ceased to be used for banking and was sold to the Tacoma Art Museum, which converted it in 1970–1971 for use as an art museum. It remained in use as the Tacoma Art Museum until 2003, when the museum moved to a new building. Already in 2002, in anticipation of its move, the art museum sold the former bank building to the Asia Pacific Cultural Center.

In 2007, a business named Sound Inpatient Physicians moved into the building. Sound Physicians remained there until 2015, when the company moved to another building in downtown Tacoma. As of October 2017, the building was for sale.
