= Beth Israel School =

Historic building in Portland, Oregon, U.S.

- U.S. National Register of Historic Places
- Portland Historic Landmark
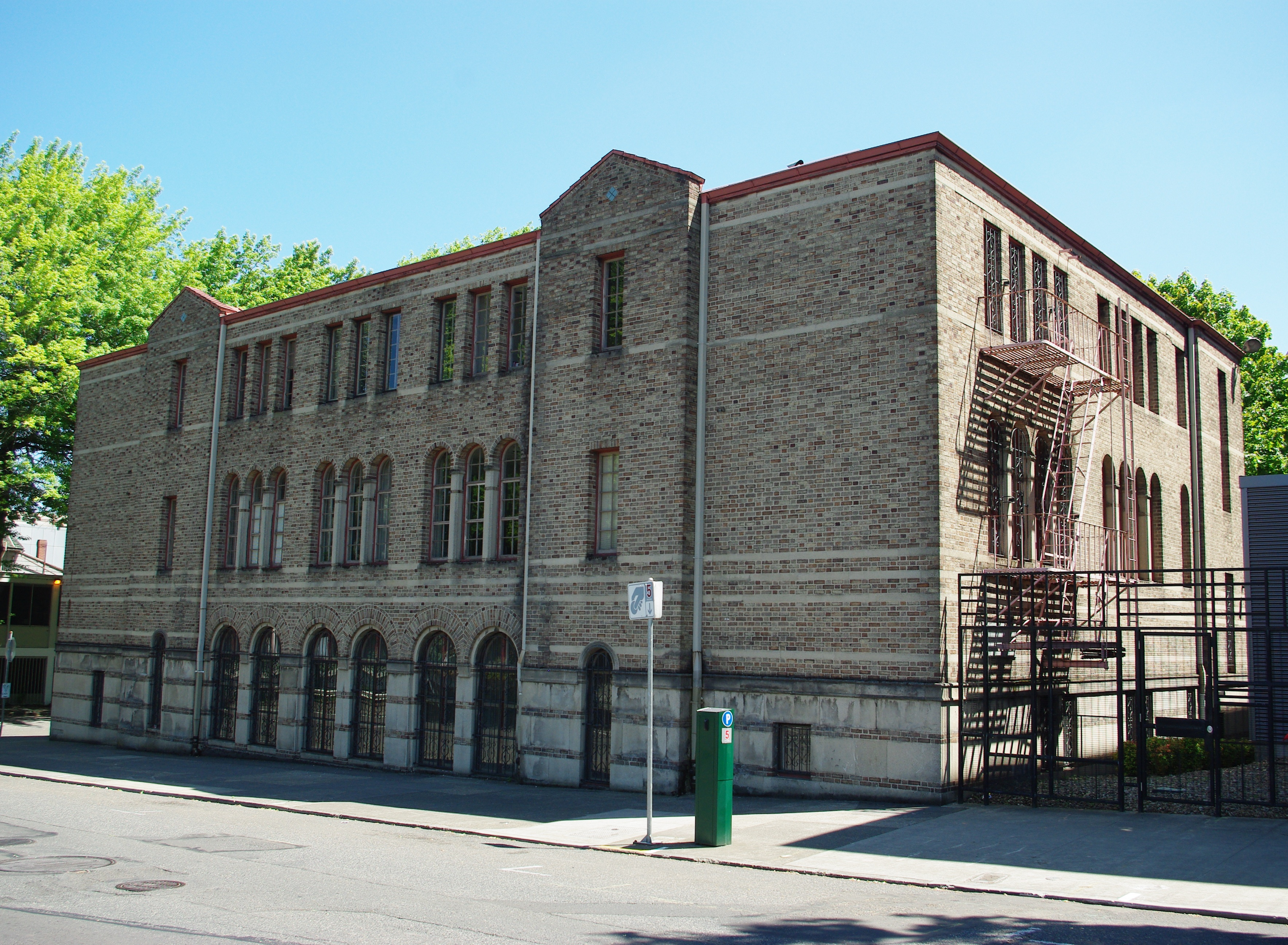
- West face of the building in 2011

- Location within Portland, Oregon
- Location: 1230 SW Main Street; Portland, Oregon
- Coordinates: 45°31′04″N 122°41′11″W
- Area: 0.1 acres (0.040 ha)
- Built: 1923
- Architect: Whitney, Sutton, Aandahl & Fritsch
- NRHP reference No.: 78002308
- Added to NRHP: August 10, 1978

The Beth Israel School, a former school building located in downtown Portland, Oregon, is listed on the National Register of Historic Places.

== See also ==
- Beth Israel Cemetery (Portland, Oregon)
- National Register of Historic Places listings in Southwest Portland, Oregon
