= Neighbors of Woodcraft Building =

Historic building in Portland, Oregon, U.S.

- U.S. National Register of Historic Places
- Portland Historic Landmark
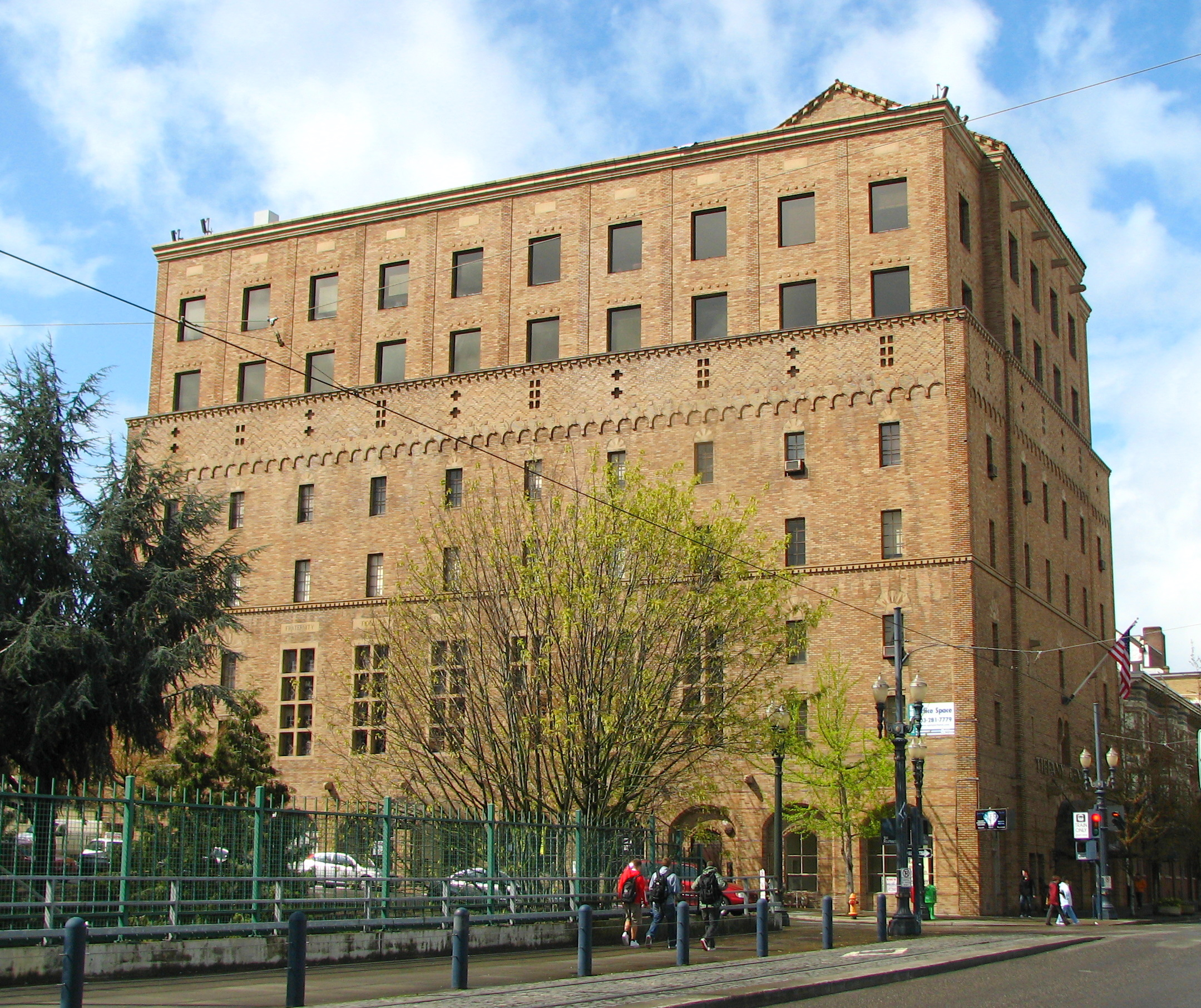
- The building's exterior in 2010

- Location within Portland, Oregon Location within Oregon Location within the United States
- Location: 1410 SW Morrison Street; Portland, Oregon
- Coordinates: 45°31′15″N 122°41′12″W
- Built: 1928
- Architect: Sutton and Whitney, et al.; Frederick Fritsch, et al.
- Architectural style: Moderne
- NRHP reference No.: 96000123
- Added to NRHP: February 22, 1996

The Neighbors of Woodcraft Building, also known as the Tiffany Center, is a building located in southwest Portland, Oregon, listed on the National Register of Historic Places. Construction of the building was commissioned by the Neighbors of Woodcraft (NOW), a non-profit fraternal benefit society based in Oregon since 1905 and operating in several western states, for use as a national headquarters and clubhouse. The building was completed in May 1929 and dedicated in June. In 1993, NOW sold the building and moved out of its remaining office space there. The building was added to the National Register in February 1996.

== See also ==
- National Register of Historic Places listings in Southwest Portland, Oregon
