= Oriental Theatre (Portland, Oregon) =

Former theater in Portland, Oregon, U.S.

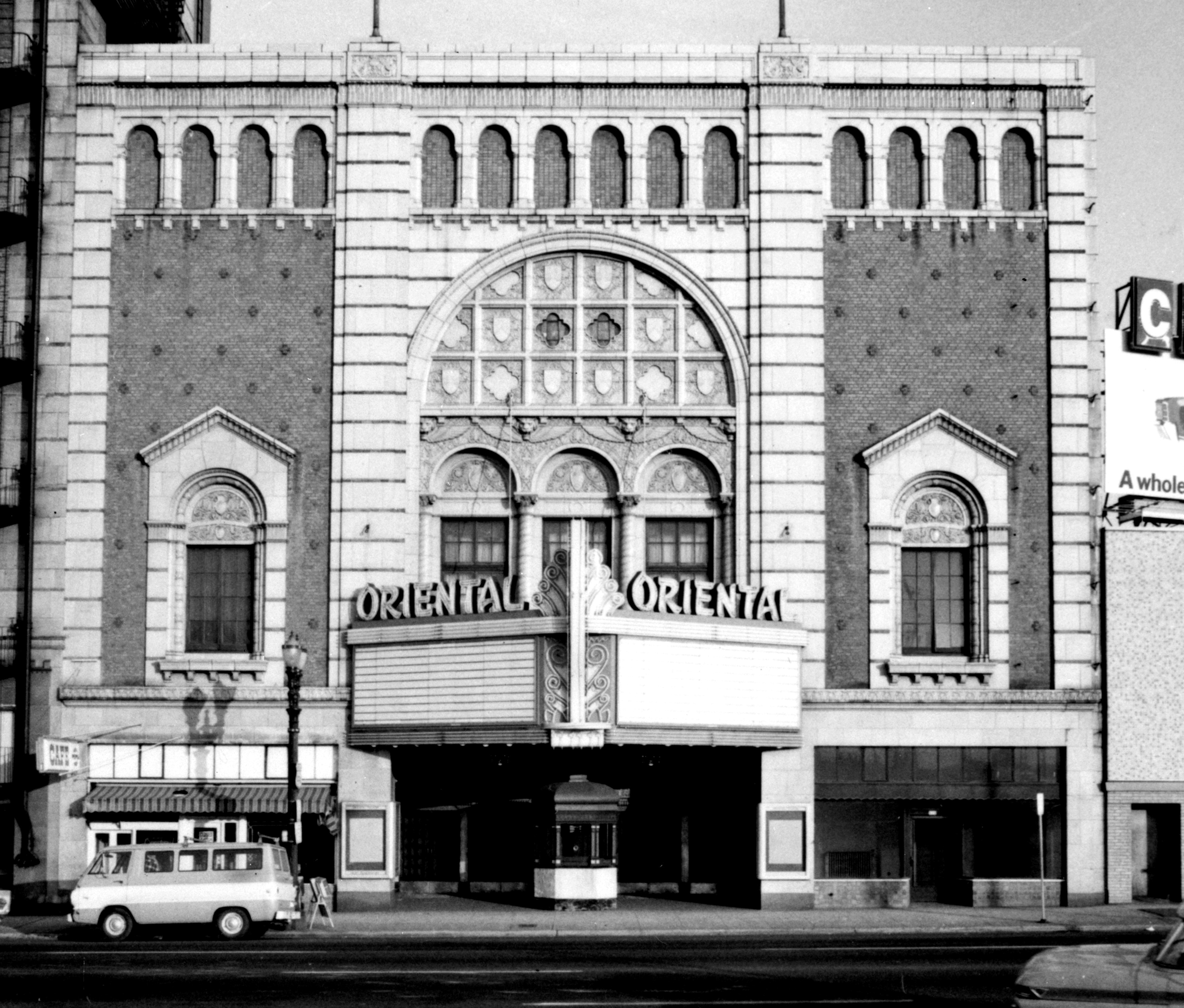
- The theater's main entrance, November 1969

- Location within Portland, Oregon
- Address: 828 SE Grand; Portland, Oregon; United States
- Coordinates: 45.516815°N 122.660753°W
- Capacity: 2,038
- Current use: Demolished (parking lot)

Construction
- Opened: December 31, 1927
- Demolished: 1970
- Architects: Lee Arden Thomas, Albert Mercier

The Oriental Theatre was a movie theater located at 828 SE Grand Street in the East Portland commercial district of Portland, Oregon that was built in 1927. The Oriental was a 2,038-seat movie palace designed by Lee Arden Thomas and Albert Mercier. The building's exterior was in the Italian Renaissance style. The interior had an "almost surreal appearance" created by interior designer Adrien Voisin. It was built by George Warren Weatherly. Demolished in 1970, the theater was adjacent to the Weatherly Building, which remains standing.

== Architecture and construction ==
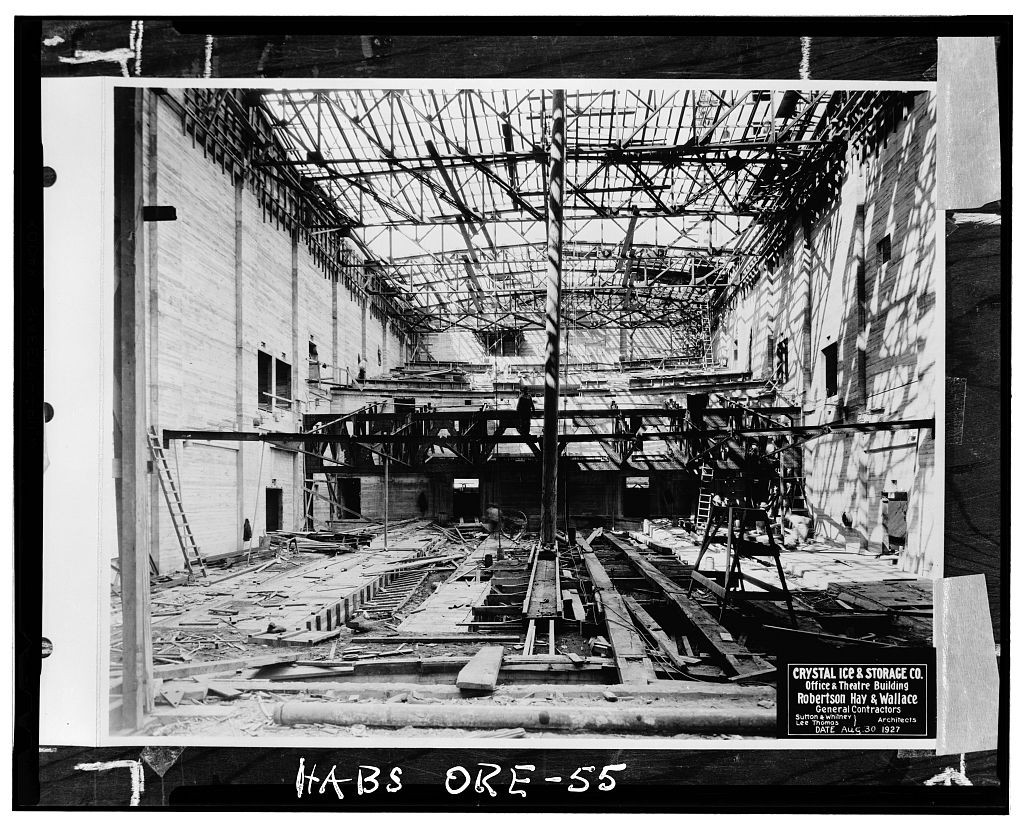
The theater while under construction, August 1927

Walter Eugene Tebbetts is listed as "the promoter who persuaded Weatherly to build a theatre," and was the first lessee and manager of the theater. Tebbetts previously managed the Italian Opera House in Chicago before arriving in Portland around 1909, after which he ran the Empire Theatre and a series of movie theaters, including the Hollywood Theatre. Tebbetts presumably visited the East Indies while travelling abroad in the late 1920s, and wanted a theatre designed to look like an East Indian temple.

Thomas and Mercier were chosen for their "association with East Portland" and their previous theatre design experience with the Bagdad Theater in Portland, McDonald Theatre in Eugene, and the Egyptian Theatre in Coos Bay. They moved into the Weatherly Building upon its completion. The building cost was "variously reported between $300,000 and $500,000." The general contractor of the building was Robertson, Hay, and Wallace. While under construction, the project was called the "Crystal Ice & Storage Co. Office & Theatre Building."

Groundbreaking began on March 21, 1927, and was completed by December. The theater opened on December 31, 1927, and was originally known as Tebbetts' Oriental Theatre.

The building was designed and built at the same time as the neighboring Weatherly Building. The exterior design matched the Weatherly Building, and heat was supplied from it.

== Design and appointment ==
The Oriental utilized Asian influences from India, Indochina, and China and included "columns on each side of the screen", said to be based on the Temple of Angkor Wat in Cambodia. There was a huge stylized face over the proscenium arch, "which had a wide open mouth baring fangs and eyes lit by red lightbulbs that would glow demonically before a show began" and "on the side walls and over the arch were life-sized plaster elephants, as well as apes, fishes, and mythological creatures, seemingly ready to pounce off the wall."

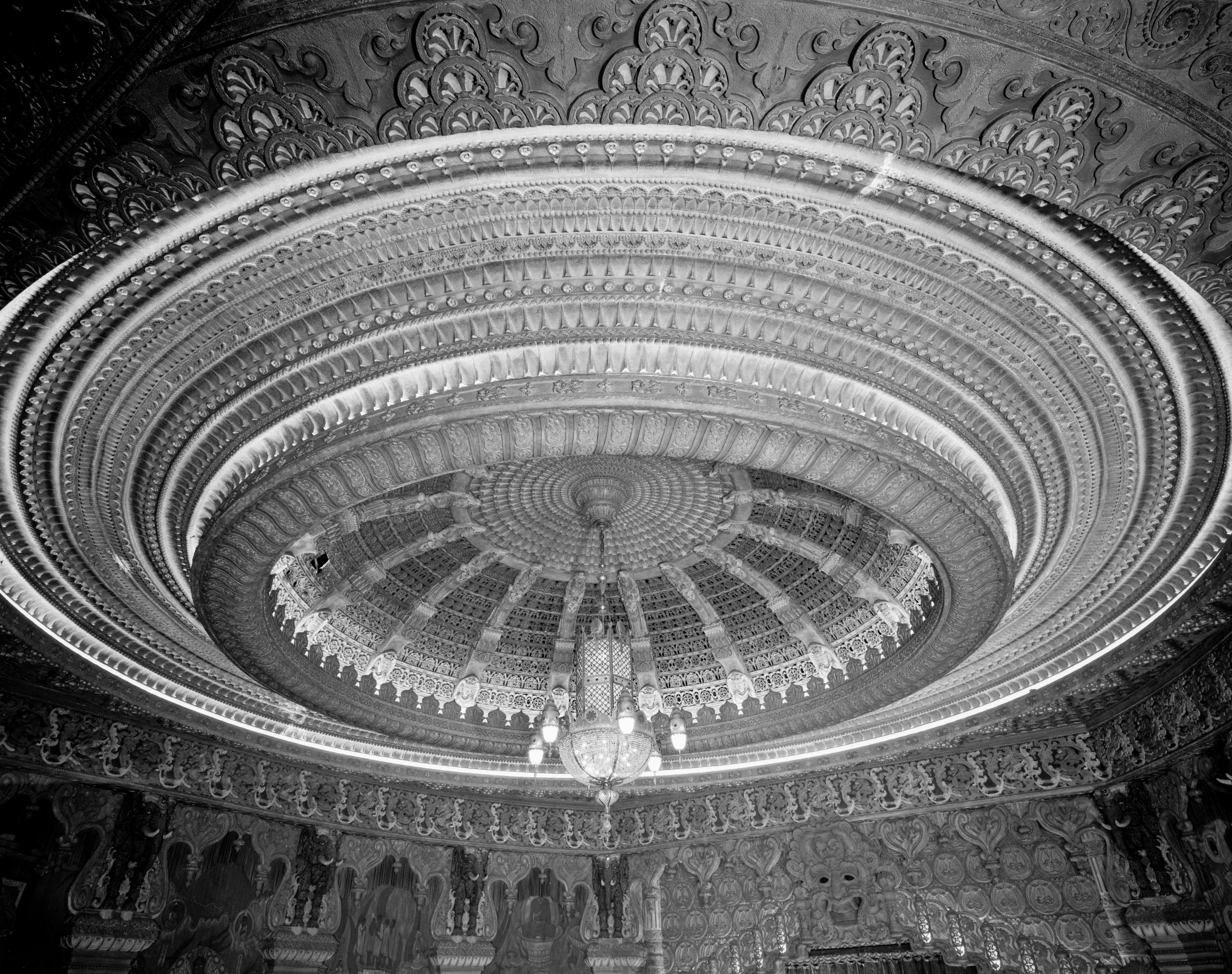
Dome and chandelier, with a combined 5,400 light bulbs

The lobby and mezzanine were decorated with Hindu deities and "the main staircase leading to the balcony was flanked by a pair of huge dragons," while the auditorium was topped by a vast dome, lit indirectly by 2400 light bulbs, as well as a 2,000-pound (910 kg) "tree-sized Far Eastern style chandelier" including 3000 light bulbs in seven colors, costing $7000. The asbestos drop curtain was blue with gold fringes and tassels and included a hand-painted royal procession scene, with "towering snow-capped mountains in the background [and] a misty blue apparition of the seated Buddha." The Historic American Buildings Survey noted the "remarkably early extensive use of neon lighting" in the sign and sheet-metal marquee.

Music was provided by a $50,000 Wurlitzer 235 Special 3-manual 13-rank organ on an ascending platform, a full orchestra pit on another ascending platform. The Wurlitzer was panned for being "never clearly audible from many of the nearly 5000 seats underneath the balcony", and for being difficult to hear for the organist. Knabe concert grand pianos were used in the orchestra and on stage, as well as a Knabe-Ampico grand player piano in the smoking room. The spacious stage was "large enough to accommodate the biggest stage shows of the day." There were also "luxurious lounges, smoking rooms and even a nursery in its basement". The nursery was called the "Kiddie Circus". It changed to a movies-only format by the 1940s "and lost its towering vertical marquee in favor of a more modest marquee not long afterwards", but remained a city showplace for years, and was used in the mid-1960s for concerts on its "mighty Wurlitzer".

== Theatre operation ==
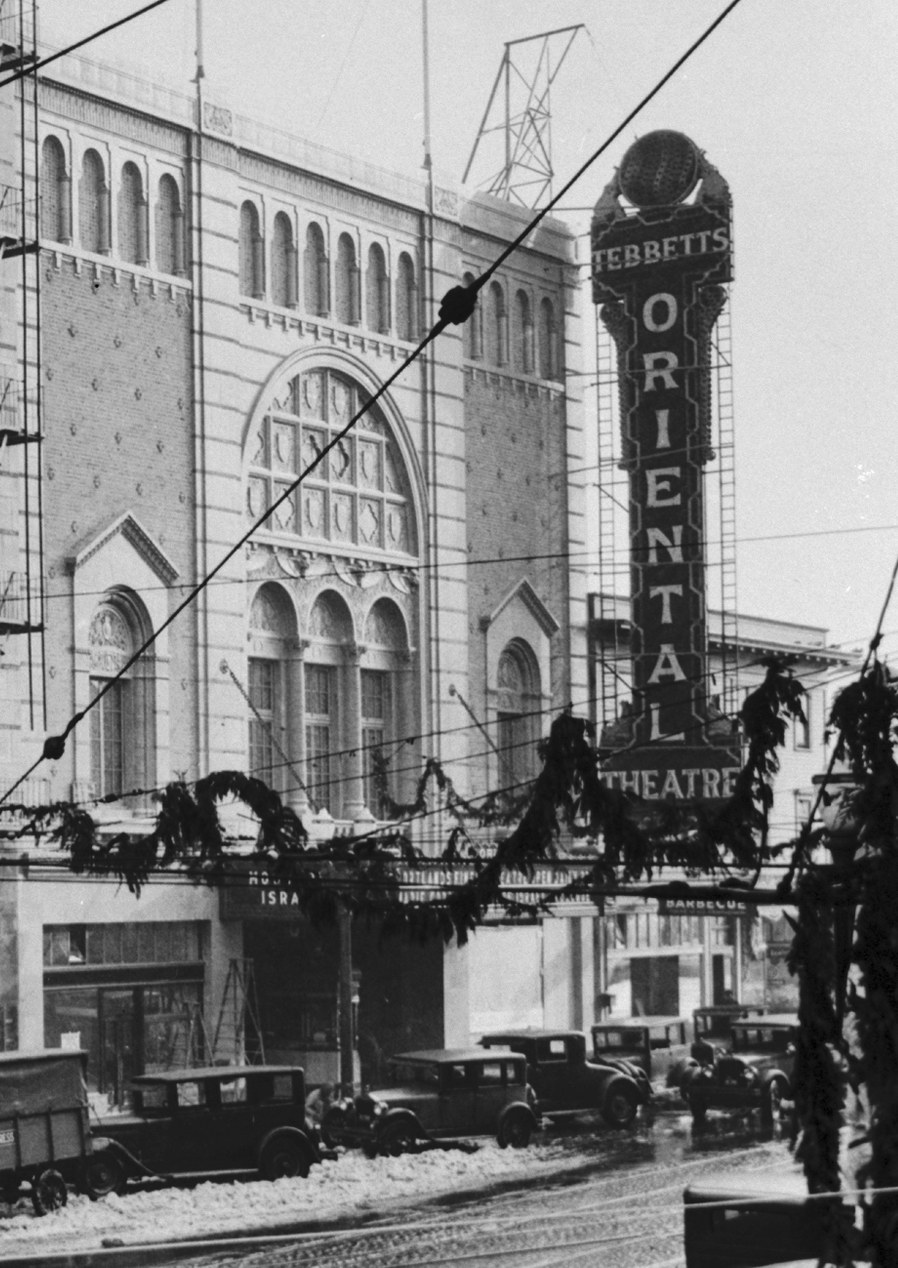
Showing the tall marquee originally mounted on the building's façade

The theatre opened on December 31, 1927, in the afternoon. The grand opening included "An Atmospheric Prologue", and silent films The Girl from Everywhere and The Moon of Israel. Portland mayor George Luis Baker dedicated the theatre, proclaiming he had "seen more expensive houses, but never a more beautiful one." Shows initially cost 25 cents for matinees, 35 cents for evenings.

The theatre upgraded to a sound system for talking pictures by 1930, perhaps earlier, as it won a bronze award for acoustics and sound systems from Will H. Hays's Exhibitors Herald-World that year. The Oriental advertised "WHERE THE SOUND IS BETTER" on their marquee in neon after winning the award.

In the late 1950s and early 1960s, a local theater company presented a summer season of Gilbert & Sullivan operettas in the Oriental.

Aside from independent operators, the theatre was leased to Evergreen Theatres in 1935, the Rainier Theatre Corporation/Fox-West Coast Theatre Company by 1940. While it "had a history of proving burdensome to independent operators", the theatre was leased to the City of Portland for 2.5 years in 1965. During this lease, Isaac Stern appeared with the Portland Symphony Orchestra on February 28, 1966. It returned to showing films after the lease expired.

== Fate ==
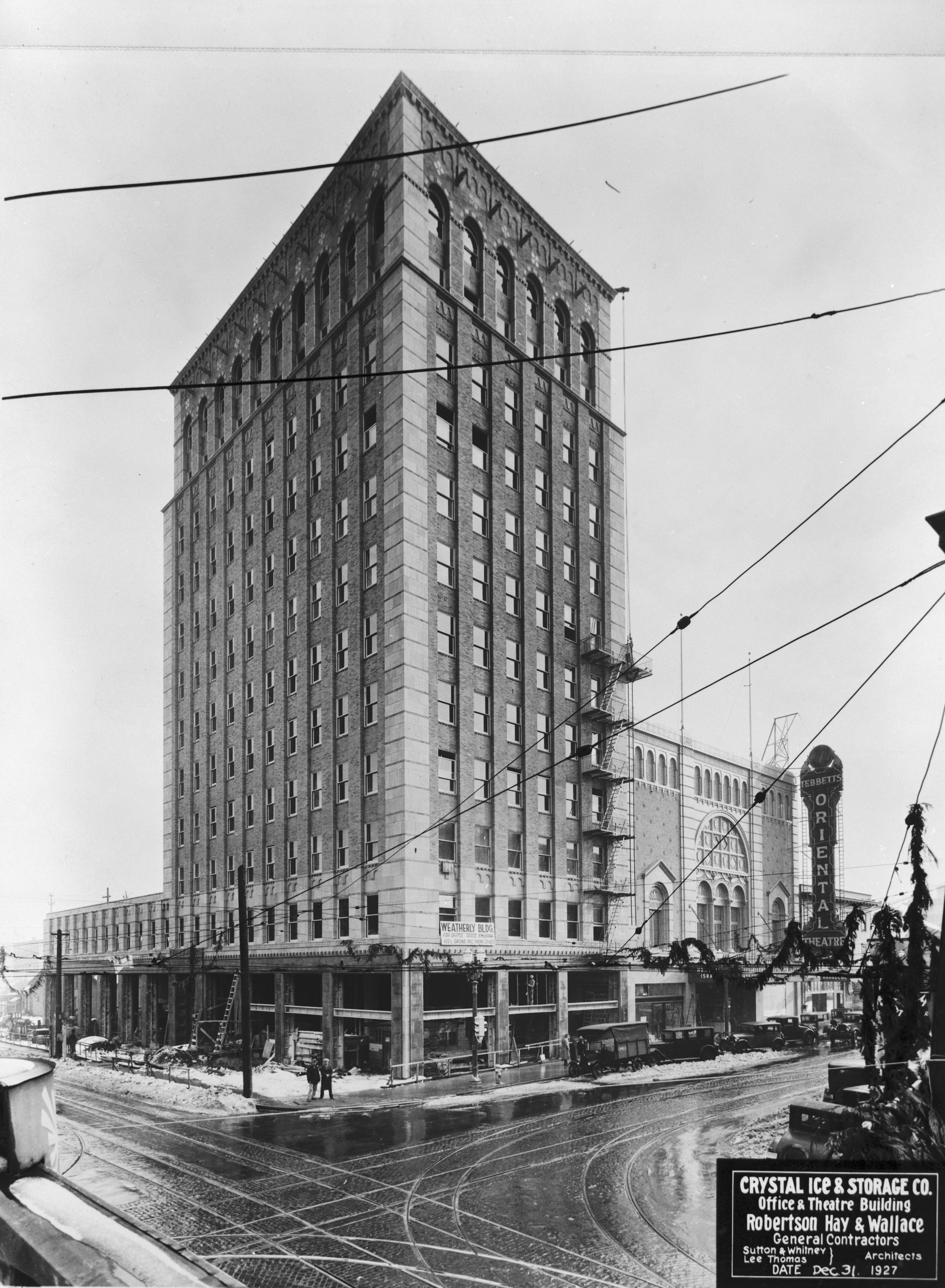
The Weatherly Building and Oriental Theatre on December 31, 1927, the theater's opening day

Lobbying to save the theatre began by at least 1959, and after Clayton Weatherly died in May 1969, the heirs decided to sell, despite a "premium lease" offer that was made.

Everything inside the theatre was auctioned off, with the Wurlitzer going to the Organ Grinder Restaurant, who later upgraded their console, sending the Oriental Theatre organ console to Uncle Milt's Pizza on Grand Blvd in Vancouver, Washington. Uncle Milt's Pizza closed in 1999, the organ-facaded building being sold to Rite Aid, who abandoned plans to build a drugstore there. The location, in Vancouver, Wa, is now a Lord's Gym, Christian "sports outreach center". Some of the plasterwork went to the Robin Hood Theatre in Sherwood, Oregon, which was being rebuilt and was subsequently renamed the Sherwood Oriental Theatre.

The Oriental Theatre was demolished in February or April 1970, making room for parking at the Weatherly Building. It was lamented as an "amazing old theater was tragically demolished to make way for another parking lot, an irreplaceable loss for the city of Portland". As of 2021, the space formerly occupied by the Oriental is still a parking lot.
