= Masonic Temple-Hoquiam =

- U.S. National Register of Historic Places
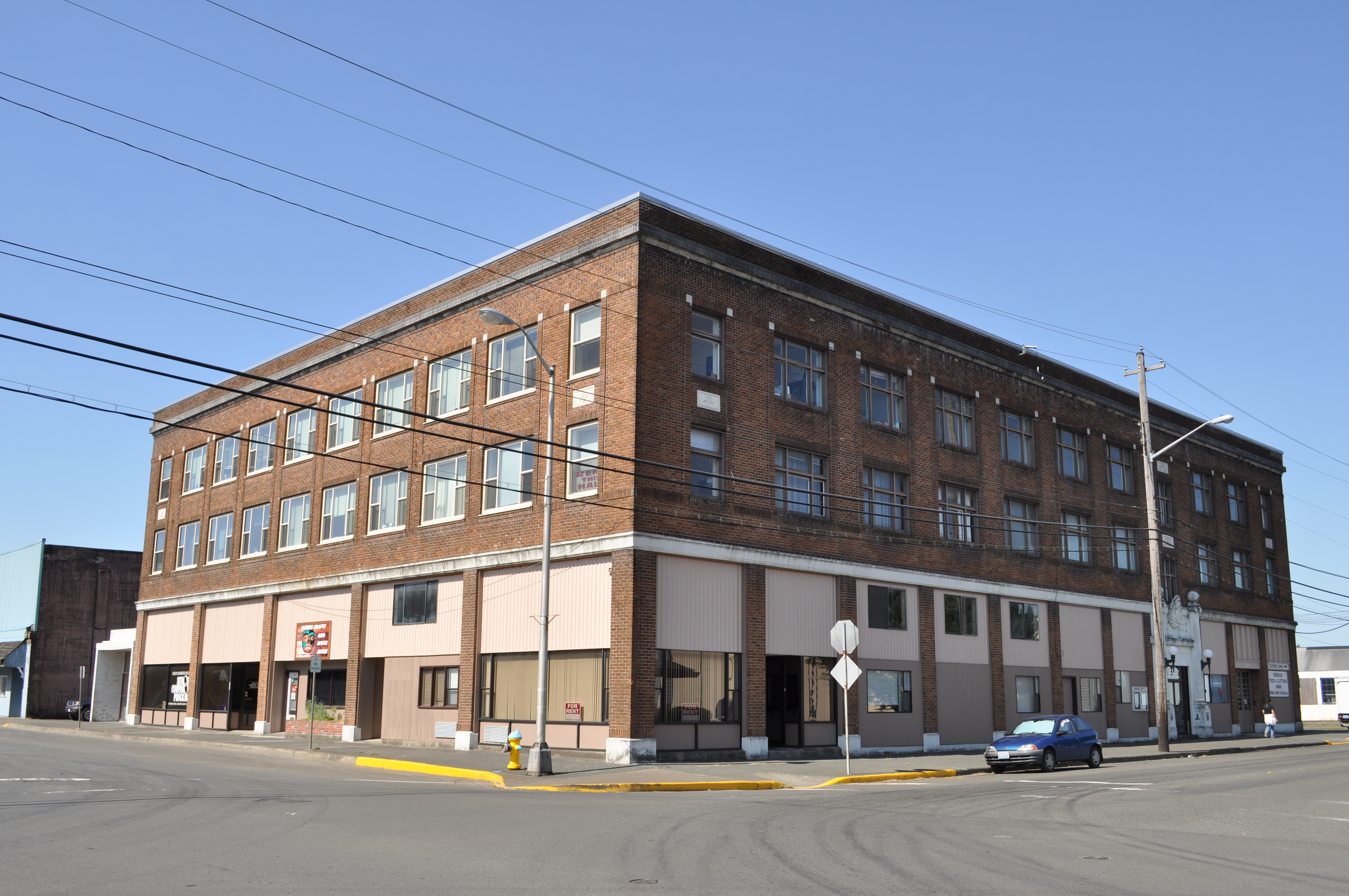

- Location within Washington (state) Location within the United States
- Location: 510 8th St., Hoquiam, Washington
- Coordinates: 46°58′38″N 123°53′14″W
- Area: less than one acre
- Built: 1922
- Built by: Grays Harbor Construction Co.
- Architect: Sutton & Whitney; Vernon & Vernon
- Architectural style: Beaux-Arts
- NRHP reference No.: 07000934
- Added to NRHP: September 5, 2007

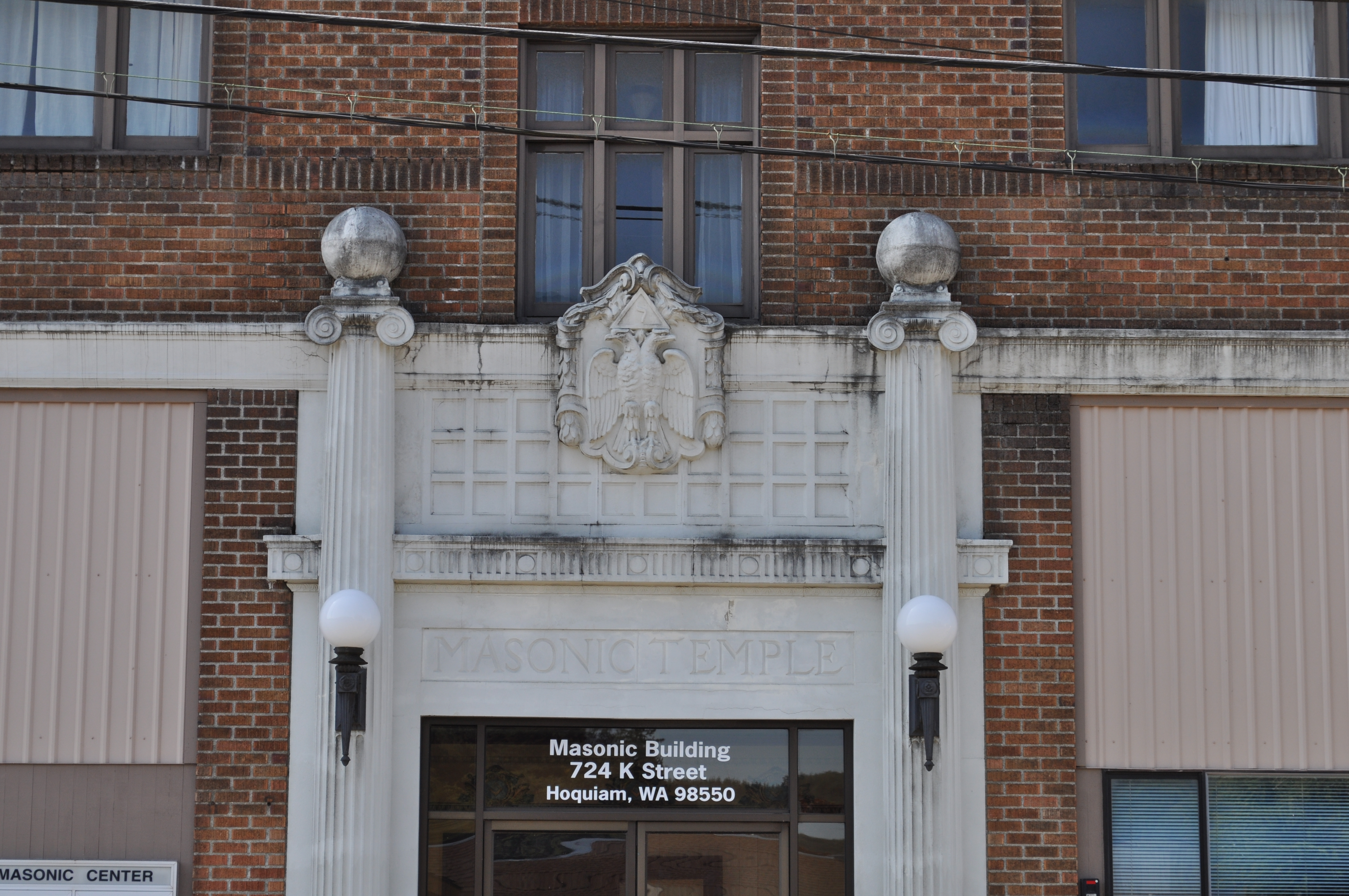

The Masonic Temple-Hoquiam, in Hoquiam, Washington, is a three-storey Beaux-Arts Masonic building that was constructed in 1922.

It includes a two-storey ballroom. It was designed by Sutton & Whitney, a Portland- and Tacoma-based partnership of Albert Sutton and Harrison A. Whitney. Sutton was a 33rd Degree Mason.

An elevator tower was added in 1949.

It was listed on the National Register of Historic Places in 2007.
