= Meier & Frank Delivery Depot =

Historic building in Portland, Oregon, U.S.

- U.S. National Register of Historic Places
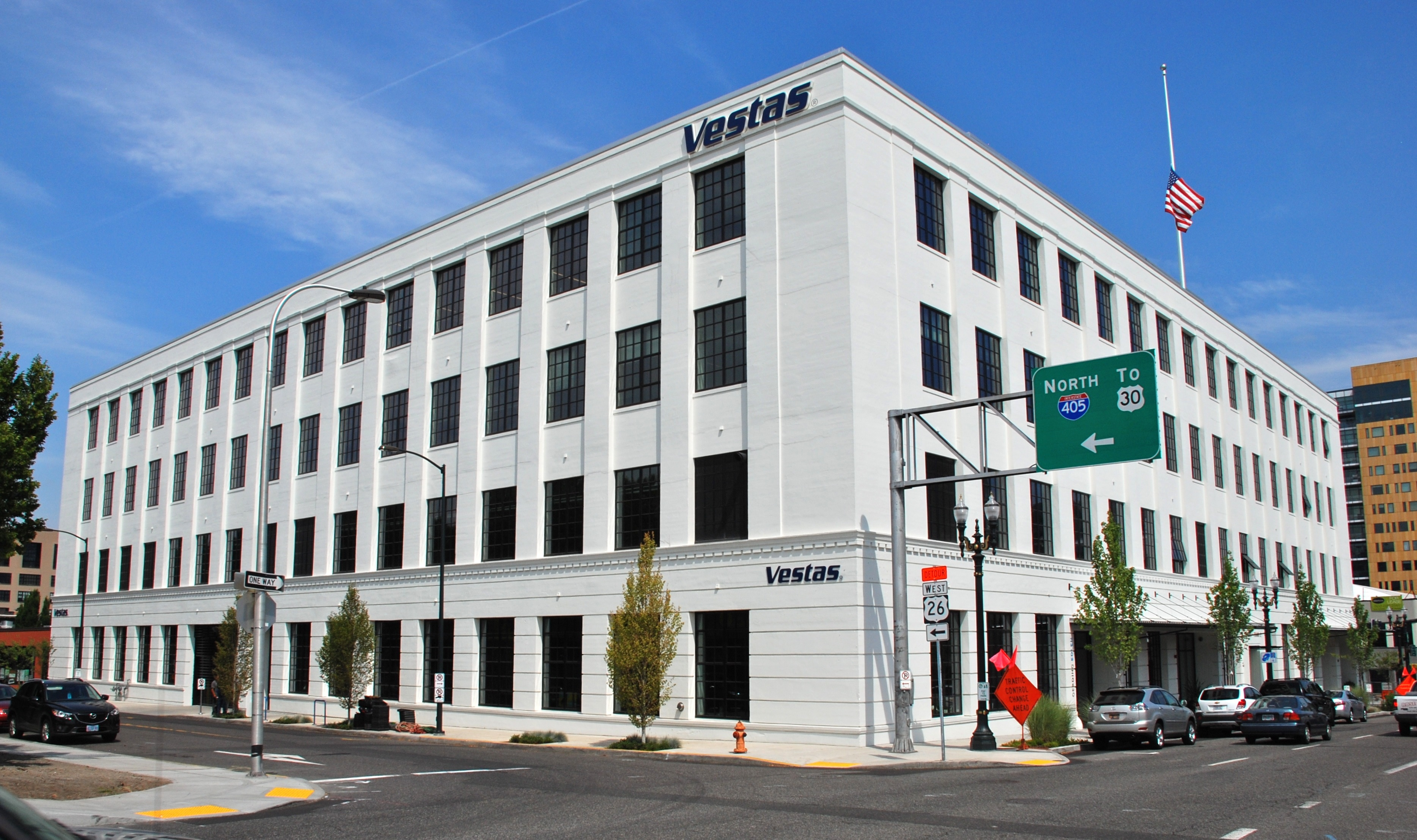
- Meier & Frank Delivery Depot in 2012 (now the U.S. headquarters of Vestas)

- Location within Portland, Oregon Location within Oregon Location within the United States
- Location: 1417 NW Everett Street; Portland, Oregon
- Coordinates: 45°31′31″N 122°41′09″W
- Built: 1927
- Architect: Sutton & Whitney
- Architectural style: Half modern
- NRHP reference No.: 01000936
- Added to NRHP: September 3, 2001

The Meier & Frank Delivery Depot, located in northwest Portland, Oregon, is listed on the National Register of Historic Places. Built for Portland retailing company Meier & Frank, the building was designed by Sutton & Whitney and constructed in 1927. From 1986 to 2001, the building was owned by the Oregon Historical Society, for processing of items and storage of its collections.

== Post-Meier & Frank usage ==
In 1986, the four-story building was acquired by the Oregon Historical Society (OHS), to house its collections and process new acquisitions. OHS remodeled the building's third and fourth floors. (Its museum and public research library remained at the location they had occupied since 1966, closer to the center of downtown.) OHS used the former Delivery Depot for processing and storage for 15 years, but after Pearl District property values began rising due to redevelopment that started in the late 1990s, the organization began receiving multiple offers to sell the property and ultimately accepted one. OHS sold the former Delivery Depot for $12.7 million in 2000 and moved to a new warehouse in suburban Gresham during the first half of 2001.

The building then entered a long period of disuse. As of October 2007, it had been vacant since the departure of OHS almost seven years earlier.

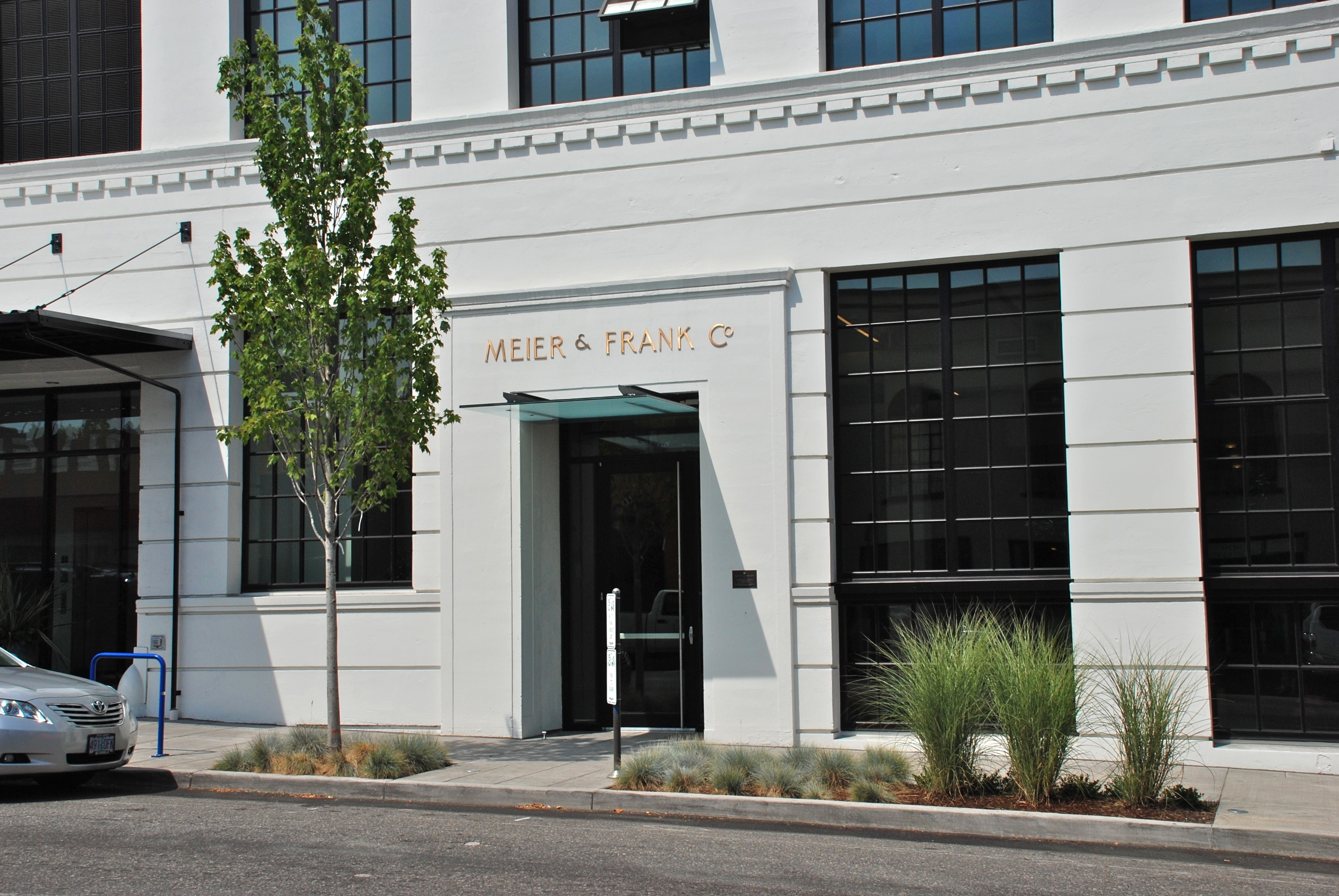
South entrance, with historic "Meier & Frank Co." lettering, in bronze, above the doorway.

In 2011–12, the building was renovated for use as the new Portland headquarters building of Danish company Vestas Wind Systems, whose U.S. headquarters had been in Portland since 2002, but at a different location. Gerding Edlen Development Company, of Portland, purchased the building in 2007, and Vestas began leasing it in 2010. The renovations cost $66 million, and the company moved into the building in spring 2012. The company is hoping to receive Platinum LEED certification for the renovated building.

== See also ==
- Meier & Frank Warehouse
- National Register of Historic Places listings in Northwest Portland, Oregon
