= Fruit and Flower Mission =

Historic building in Portland, Oregon, U.S.

- U.S. National Register of Historic Places
- Portland Historic Landmark
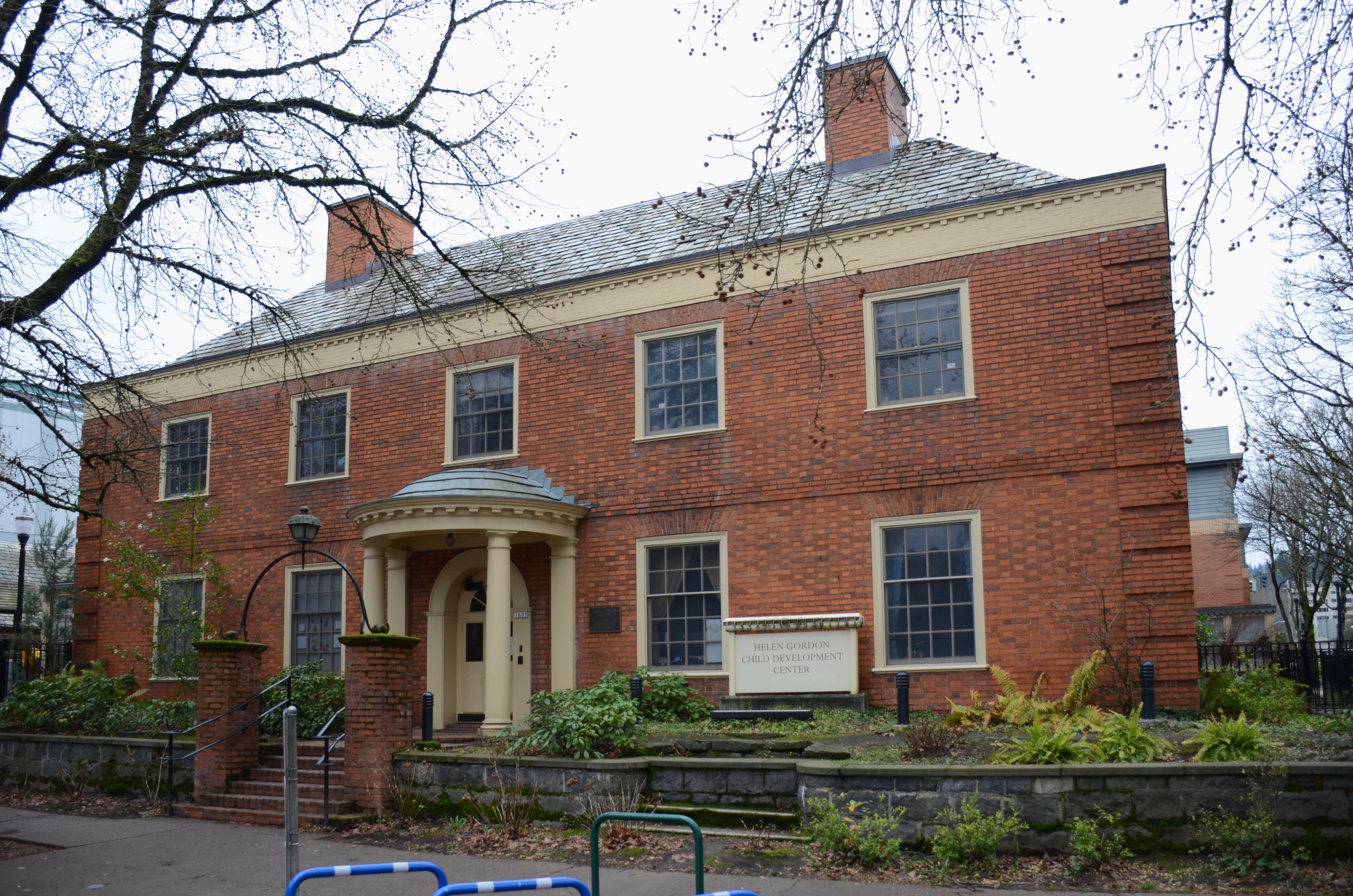
- East façade in 2018. The building now serves as the Helen Gordon Child Development Center on the campus of Portland State University.

- Location within Portland, Oregon Location within Oregon Location within the United States
- Location: 1609 SW 12th Avenue; Portland, Oregon
- Coordinates: 45°30′52″N 122°41′16″W
- Built: 1928
- Architect: Sutton & Whitney, Frederick A. Fritsch
- Architectural style: Colonial Revival, Georgian Revival
- NRHP reference No.: 86001225
- Added to NRHP: June 5, 1986

The Fruit and Flower Mission was an American benevolent organization, established after the civil war.

One of its buildings located in the West End area of downtown Portland, Oregon, is listed on the National Register of Historic Places.

== Background ==
In 1865, after the Civil War, the Pittsburgh Fruit and Flower Mission was started when members of the United States Sanitary Commission would visit wounded Union and Confederate soldiers passing through Pittsburgh or in local hospitals, bringing them books, home-grown flowers, and fruit.

In 1869, Boston Flower and Fruit Mission, Hollis St. Chapel by Committee of 12 ladies.

In 1870, Shawmut Fruit and Flower Mission, by Shawmut Universalist Church, to the South End, Boston.

By May 1886, the Flower and Fruit Mission of San Francisco was taking flowers and fruit to the sick in the hospitals and the sick poor in their homes, every Thursday.

In 1892, in Boston, flower distribution was made through an Association of Mutual Helpers.

In 1892, Lizzie Borden was a member of the Central Congregational Church, serving as the Secretary to the Fruit and Flower Mission, and treasurer to the Fall River, Massachusetts Young Woman's Christian Temperance Union.

In 1904, the Flower and Fruit Mission of Saratoga Hospital, Saratoga Springs, NY was founded. Members sewed blankets, caps, and clothing for the infants, provided flowers and fruit for new mothers, and made jars of jam for hospital meals and fundraisers.

In 1907, a long-running campaign called the Benevolent Fraternity Fruit and Flower Mission of Boston, was taken over by the Benevolent Fraternity of Unitarian Churches, at Horticultural Hall (Boston).

In 1907, the Flower and Fruit Mission of Seattle (which became the first Circle of the Overlake Service League in 1913) was formed in 1907 by Othilia Carroll Beals and other women who met at the home of Mrs. Park Weed Willis, which, in 1935, became the Seattle Milk Fund.

== See also ==
- National Register of Historic Places listings in Southwest Portland, Oregon
