= Sutton & Whitney =

American architecture firm, 1912-1950

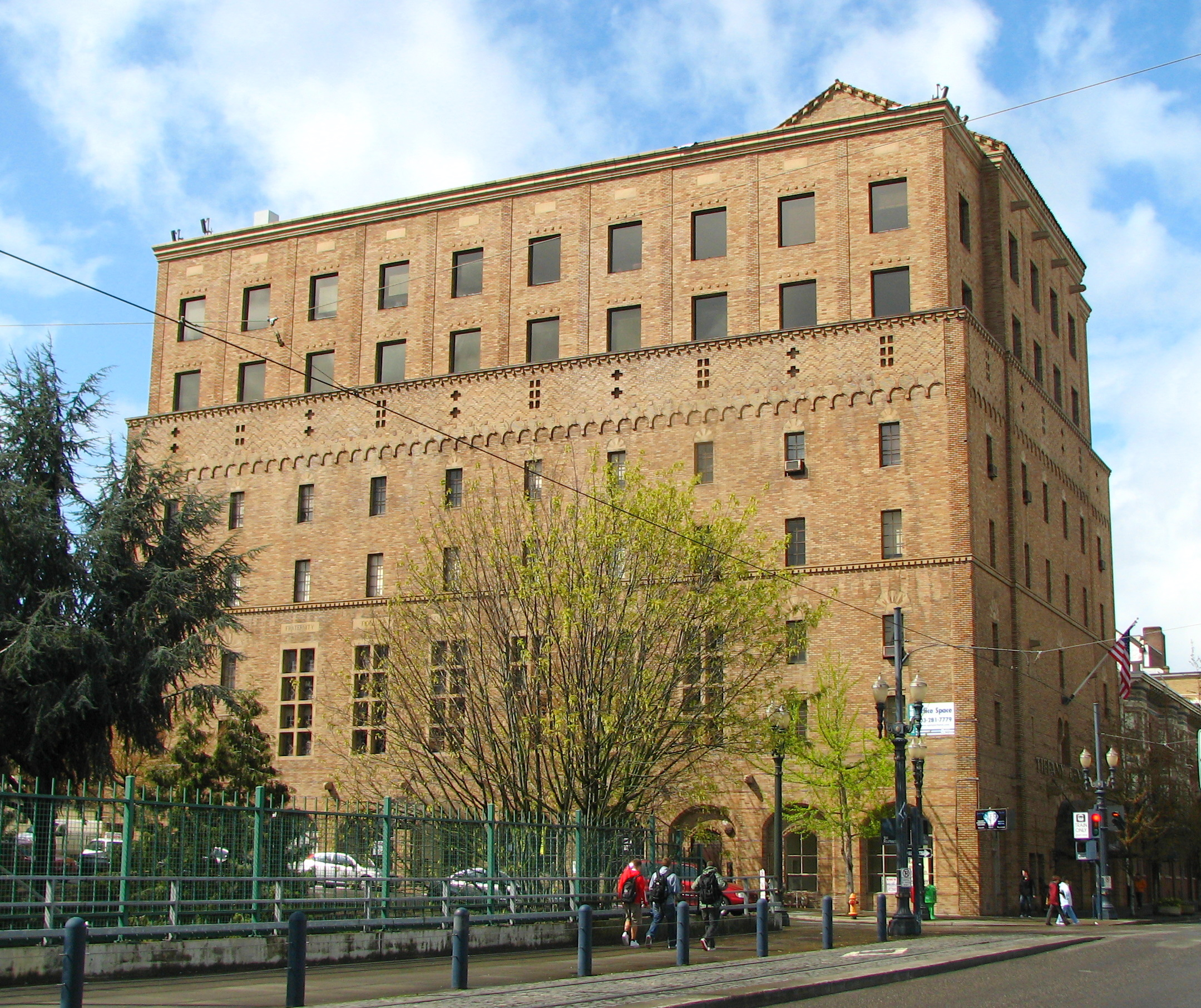
The historic Neighbors of Woodcraft Building, built 1929, NRHP-listed

Sutton & Whitney was an architecture firm based in Portland, Oregon, United States, operating from 1912 to 1950. Its principal partners were Albert Sutton (1867–1923) and Harrison A. Whitney (1877–1962). In 1934, it became Sutton, Whitney & Aandahl, after full membership was granted to Frederick Aandahl (1887–1950), who had already been working for the firm as chief draftsman since 1919 and as an associate since 1923.

A number of its works are listed on the U.S. National Register of Historic Places. Richard Sundeleaf was an architect who worked there, before starting his own firm.

== Selected works ==
- Ballou & Wright Company Building, 327 N.W. Tenth Ave., Portland, OR (Sutton & Whitney), NRHP-listed
- Beth Israel School, 1230 S.W. Main St., Portland, OR (Sutton, Whitney, Aandahl & Fritsch), NRHP-listed
- Fruit and Flower Mission, built 1928, 1609 S.W. Twelfth Ave., Portland, OR (Sutton & Whitney), NRHP-listed
- Hood River County Library and Georgiana Smith Park, 502 State St., Hood River, OR (Sutton and Whitney), NRHP-listed
- J. K. Gill Company Building, 426 SW Stark St., Portland, OR (Sutton & Whitney)
- Masonic Temple-Hoquiam, built 1922, 510 8th St., Hoquiam, WA (Sutton & Whitney), NRHP-listed
- Meier & Frank Warehouse, 1438 N.W. Irving St., Portland, OR (Sutton and Whitney), NRHP-listed
- Meier & Frank Delivery Depot, built 1927, 1417 N.W. Everett St., Portland, OR (Sutton & Whitney), NRHP-listed
- Mount Hood Masonic Temple, 5308 N. Commercial Ave., Portland, OR (Sutton & Whitney), NRHP-listed
- National Bank of Tacoma, 1123 Pacific Ave., Tacoma, WA (Sutton & Whitney), NRHP-listed
- Neighbors of Woodcraft Building, 1410 S.W. Morrison St., Portland, OR (Sutton and Whitney, et al.), NRHP-listed
- Shriners Hospital for Crippled Children, built 1923, 8200 N.E. Sandy Blvd., Portland, OR (Sutton & Whitney), NRHP-listed
- Weatherly Building, designed also with Lee Arden Thomas
