= Listed buildings in Heckmondwike =

Heckmondwike is a town and an unparished area in the metropolitan borough of Kirklees, West Yorkshire, England. Heckmondwike ward contains 20 listed buildings that are recorded in the National Heritage List for England. Of these, two are listed at Grade II*, the middle of the three grades, and the others are at Grade II, the lowest grade. The listed buildings include houses, churches, a former chapel and associated structures, a public house, a Masonic hall, cemetery buildings, a drinking fountain and clock tower, a bank, a former Sunday school, a shop, and a pair of telephone kiosks.

== Key ==
Grade	Criteria
II*	Particularly important buildings of more than special interest
II	Buildings of national importance and special interest

== Buildings ==
Name and location	Photograph	Date	Notes	Grade
Old Hall Public House; 53.71135°N 1.67710°W	—	15th century (probable)	The house, later a public house, has a timber framed core, it was encased in stone in the 17th century, and has since been altered. Originally a hall with cross-wings, it was reduced in size when the railway was built nearby. The building is in stone with quoins, and a stone slate roof with chamfered gable copings. It consists of a single-storey hall range, and a two-storey cross-wing on the east. The windows are mullioned or mullioned and transomed. Inside, there is exposed timber framing.	II*
Liversedge Hall and cottage 53.70389°N 1.69119°W	—	c 1600	The house, which has been altered, is in stone with a parapet, and has a stone slate roof with chamfered coping to the gables and ornamental finials. There are two storeys, a rear extension, a symmetrical front of three bays, and an L-shaped plan. In the centre is a doorway and small flanking windows, and the other windows are mullioned and transomed. Above the openings in both floors are continuous hood moulds.	II
92 High Street; 53.70889°N 1.66392°W	—	Early 18th century	A stone house with quoins, and a stone slate roof with chamfered gable copings on moulded kneelers. There are two storeys and an L-shaped plan. On the left is a gabled cross-wing, and in the centre is an arched doorway. Above the doorway is a single-light window, and the other windows are mullioned with hood moulds.	II
Two cottages adjoining 19 Oldfields Lane; 53.70704°N 1.67308°W	—	Late 18th century	Originally a pair of cottages, later a workshop, the building is in stone, the right gable is in brick, and there are quoins and a stone slate roof. It has two storeys, the doorways have deep lintels, and the windows are mullioned with three lights.	II
Field Head House; 53.71140°N 1.68407°W	—	Early 18th century	The house is in painted stone on the front and brick on the sides and at the rear. It has moulded stone gutter brackets and a hipped slate roof. There are two storeys and a symmetrical front of three bays. In the centre is a Doric portico with a full entablature, a single light above, and three-light mullioned windows in the outer bays. At the rear is a central doorway with a round-arched stair window above.	II
St James' Church; 53.70687°N 1.67037°W		1830–31	A commissioners' church designed by Peter Atkinson, junior in Early English style, the chancel and Lady chapel were added in 1904–06 by C. Hodgson Fowler, and the east window in 1930 by Charles Nicholson. The church is built in stone with a slate roof, and consists of a nave, a south porch, a north baptistry, a chancel and chapel, and a west steeple. The steeple has a two-stage tower with buttresses, a south doorway, clock faces on three sides, and a hexagonal broach spire with gargoyles. The windows are lancets, and the east window has five lights.	II
Masonic Hall, gates, gate piers and wall 53.70547°N 1.67356°W		1851	The Masonic hall is in stone with a string course, a moulded eaves cornice and blocking course, and a hipped slate roof. There are two storeys and a basement, and a symmetrical front of three bays, the middle bay projecting under a pediment containing Masonic motifs. Flanking the central bay are rusticated quoins with pilasters above. In the bay is a doorway with pilasters, a semicircular fanlight, and a full entablature. The windows have architraves, and in the upper floor they are round-headed. The steps leading up to the doorway have flanking walls and ornamental iron lamp standards, and in front of the forecourt is a low wall with iron railings and gates.	II
Cemetery chapels 53.71295°N 1.67117°W		c. 1860	The chapels, now disused, are in stone with slate roofs, and consist of two identical chapels joined by an arched carriageway. The archway is surmounted by a tower, square at the bottom, rising to octagonal, and with a slender spire. Each of the chapels has a porch and three-light windows with hood moulds.	II
Gates, gate piers, wall and railings to cemetery 53.71186°N 1.67098°W	—	c. 1860	Flanking the entrance to the cemetery are square stone gate piers with cusped sunk panels and octagonal tapering tops, and there are similar smaller piers with pyramidal tops outside the pedestrian entrances and at the ends. Between the outer piers are dwarf stone walls with decorative iron railings, and the gates are similar.	II
Drinking fountain 53.70709°N 1.67458°W		1863	The drinking fountain was built to commemorate the wedding of Edward VII, then Prince of Wales, with Princess Alexandra, and a clock tower was added in 1904. The fountain has a square stone base with diagonal buttresses, between which are red and black granite panels and two red granite drinking bowls. On this is a square stage with scrolled buttresses between which are carved faces with wreaths and inscribed red granite plaques. Surmounting this is an iron clock tower with a lamp, and the structure is enclosed by iron railings with ornamental heads.	II
HSBC Bank; 53.70746°N 1.67486°W		1863	The bank on a corner site, formerly the Midland, is in stone with rusticated quoins, a dentilled cornice over the ground floor, a dentilled eaves cornice with a balustrade, and a hipped slate roof. There are three storeys, a front of four bays, one bay on the left side, and a canted corner. In the ground floor the openings have pilasters, segmental heads with keystones, and carving in the spandrels. The windows in the middle floor have square heads, a guilloché frieze, and canopies on square brackets. The top floor contains windows with chamfered surrounds, shouldered heads, and aprons.	II
Sunday School, Upper Independent Chapel; 53.70943°N 1.66407°W		1863	The former Sunday school is in stone, with a string course and a hipped slate roof. There are two storeys, a front of five bays, and three bays along the sides. On the front, the middle three bays project under a pediment containing an oculus, foliage decoration and an inscription in the tympanum. The windows are round-headed, those in the upper floor with slightly-pointed heads, Composite pilasters, and keystones.	II
Front Block, Spen Valley Carpet Works; 53.70930°N 1.68638°W		c. 1870	The building is in stone with a rusticated ground floor, a moulded string course, a bracketed eaves cornice and a blocking course, and a hipped slate roof. There are two storeys and 13 bays, the middle bay projecting under a segmental pediment. The central round-headed doorway has a vermiculated surround, a fanlight, and a bracketed cornice. Above it is a three-light mullioned window with pilasters, a frieze and a segmental pediment. The windows are sashes, in the ground floor with square heads, and in the upper floor with round arches, impost blocks, keystones, and aprons.	II
20 and 22 Market Street; 53.70633°N 1.67413°W		1883	A shop with living accommodation above, it is in stone with moulded gutter brackets, a slate roof, three storeys and one bay. In the ground floor is a shop window flanked by doors. Each of the upper floors contains round-headed windows with three lights, and sills on carved brackets. In the middle floor the windows have colonnettes in red granite with foliated capitals. Above are pointed moulded hood moulds with carvings in the tympani, and below are moulded aprons with carved foliage. In the top floor the colonnettes are in stone and cable-moulded and the hood mould is continuous, and above are two roundels with the date.	II
Upper Independent Chapel; 53.70942°N 1.66449°W		1888–90	The chapel, later converted for residential use, is in stone with a slate roof. There are two storeys, a front of five bays, and sides of seven bays. The middle three bays on the front project and form a porch with four Composite columns carrying an inscribed frieze, and a dentilled and bracketed pediment with an oculus in the tympanum and an anthemion ornament on the apex. The outer bays are flanked by Composite pilasters and contain round-arched windows, in the ground floor with a rusticated apron, a moulded sill, and a cornice on carved consoles, and in the upper floor with a blind balustrade. Above the left bay is an octagonal tower, containing round-arched windows with flanking pilasters, an entablature, and a pierced balustrade with ball finials. Over the right bay is an octagonal leaded dome. Along the sides are windows, segmental-headed in the ground floor and round-headed in the upper floor, and all with an architrave and a decorative keystone. The tower and dome are surrounded by vases.	II*
Walls, railings, gate and gate piers, Upper Independent Chapel; 53.70913°N 1.66442°W	—	c. 1888–90	The grounds of the former chapel are enclosed by dwarf coped walls and decorative cast iron railings with ornamental finials. The main entrance is flanked by stone gate piers with round-headed sunk panels and pedimented caps with a ball finial, and the double gates have decorative rails and a scrolled and crested top. The other entrance has gate piers with segmental pediments containing carved foliage and a single gate.	II
Walls, railings, gate and gate piers, Sunday School; 53.70920°N 1.66392°W	—	c. 1890	The grounds of the former Sunday school are enclosed by dwarf coped walls and decorative cast iron railings with ornamental finials. The square stone gate piers have segmental pediments containing carved foliage, and there is a single cast iron gate.	II
Holy Spirit Church; 53.70910°N 1.67215°W		1914–15	The church is in red brick with grey faience dressings and a slate roof. It is in Byzantine Revival style, and has a Latin cross plan. There is a central copper dome with a cross finial on an octagonal drum containing lancet windows. Above the doorway is an inscribed panel, the doorway is in an arched surround, and above it are a moulded impost band and seven circular windows. On each side of the central space are aisles and transepts, and at the east end are three blind apses.	II
War memorial 53.70789°N 1.67650°W		1922	The war memorial stands in The Green, and is in Scottish granite. Its design is based n the Cross of Sacrifice by Reginald Blomfield, and consists of a tall cross with a bronze sword on the front. The cross is on a large octagonal plinth on a three-stage base. On the plinth and base are inscriptions, and the names of those lost in the two World Wars and the Korean War.	II
Two telephone kiosks 53.70739°N 1.67496°W		1935	The two telephone kiosks in Market Place are of the K6 type, designed by Giles Gilbert Scott. Constructed in cast iron with a square plan and a dome, they have three unperforated crowns in the top panels.	II
