= Evan MacColl =

Scottish-Canadian poet (1808–1898)

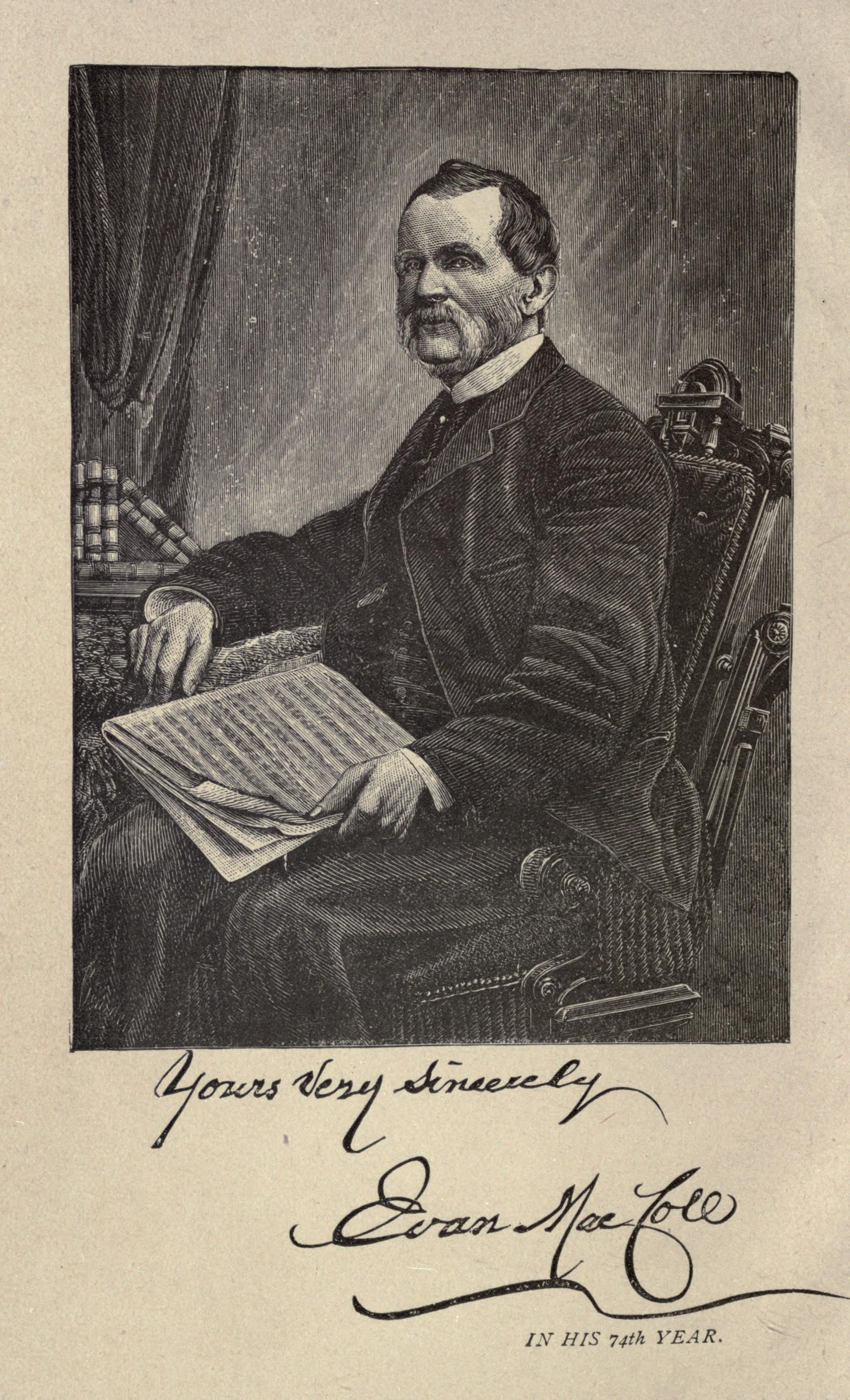
- Engraving of Evan MacColl c. 1885
- Born: 21 September 1808; Kenmore, Argyll and Bute, Scotland
- Died: 24 July 1898 (aged 89); Toronto, Ontario, Canada
- Occupations: Gaelic poet, composer
- Spouse(s): Frances Lewthwaite, Isabella MacArthur

Evan MacColl (Scottish Gaelic: "Eòghann MacColla"; 1808–1898) was a Scottish-born bilingual poet in both Canadian Gaelic and Canadian English. He is commonly known in his native language as Bàrd Loch Fìne (the "Poet of Loch Fyne"). Later he became known as "the Gaelic Bard of Canada".

== Early life ==
Evan MacColl was born at Kenmore on the banks of Loch Fyne, Argyll and Bute, Scotland, on 21 September 1808 when the area was thoroughly Gaelic speaking. His father was Dugald MacColl who was possessed of "the richest store of Celtic song of any man living in his part of the country." His mother, Mary Cameron, "was noted for her storehouse of traditional tales, legendary and fairy tales." She was also said to be something of an 'improvisatrice' or maker-up of tales. Though MacColl was fully employed farming and fishing, and later with road repairs, he nevertheless received a fair education. His father was fond of literature and procured books for his children when he could. The local village school offered a very limited education in English, and his father employed a tutor who taught his son English and instilled in him a love of Burns and of English literature in general. His poetic efforts began in boyhood, founded on a rich vein of the native Gaelic literary tradition surrounding him in youth and inherited from his family, although also inflected by the growing influence of Lowland Scots and anglophone literature.

== Later life ==
MacColl's family emigrated to Canada in 1831, but he could not make up his mind to join the Scottish diaspora. He continued his employment in road repairs while composing many of his best-regarded Gaelic lyrics. He published his first book of poems at his own expense in Glasgow in 1836. This was The Mountain Minstrel; or, Clàrsach nam Beann, and it sold enough to give the author a small profit. In 1837, he began contributing to the Gaelic Magazine then published in Glasgow. From October 1838 to January 1839, MacColl made a tour of northeast Scotland which was recorded in a diary published by Alexander Mackenzie in his biography of MacColl. Later in 1839 he became a clerk with the Customs House in Liverpool. He remained in Liverpool until 1850, when, because of declining health, he obtained six months' leave of absence and visited friends and relatives in Glengarry County, Ontario. While staying on his brother's farm on the Trent River, he was introduced to the Hon. Malcolm Cameron, then a Minister of the Crown and was offered a position in the Canadian Customs at Kingston, Ontario, which he accepted. MacColl remained in this post for thirty years and was superannuated about the year 1880. His first wife was Frances Lewthwaite whom he married in Toxteth, Liverpool on 6 May 1847. He later married Isabella MacArthur in Kingston. He had nine children from one or both marriages. He died on 24 July 1898 in Toronto and was buried in Kingston.

== Poetic achievements ==
Dr. Norman McLeod, editor of Good Words, wrote as follows:

Evan MacColl's poetry is the product of a mind impressed with the beauty and the grandeur of the lovely scenes in which his infancy has been nursed. We have no hesitation in saying that the work is that of a man possessed of much poetic genius. Wild indeed and sometimes rough are his rhymes and epithets, yet there are thoughts so new and striking—images and comparisons so beautiful and original—feelings so warm and fresh that stamp this Highland peasant as no ordinary man.

MacColl wrote numerous poems while in Canada, including one in Gaelic in praise of a Scottish organization in Toronto in 1858. MacColl was literate in Gaelic and was a well-respected authority on the literature of the Highlands, sought out in Canada by those who took an interest in the subject.

One of MacColl’s English poems is "Robin", written for the occasion of the Burns Centennial celebration in Kingston. The poem's easy and melodious expression is in excellent imitation of Burns' own style. He had been for many years the bard of the St. Andrew's Society of Kingston, and his anniversary poems are greatly appreciated by all Scotsmen. His poetic gifts were inherited by his daughter, Miss Mary J. MacColl, who published a meritorious little volume of poems entitled "Bide a wee," highly commended for their sweetness and delicacy.

== Publications ==
=== Books ===
- The Mountain Minstrel; or, Clàrsach nam Beann consisting of original poems and songs, in English and Gaelic, etc. Glasgow: Maclachlan & Stewart, 1836.
- The English poetical works of Evan MacColl with a biographical sketch of the author by A. MacKenzie. (Contributor: Alexander Mackenzie, 1838–1898) Toronto : Hunter, Rose. Edinburgh : MacLachlan & Stewart, 1883. (This 'biographical sketch' is a reprint of Mackenzie's biography in The Celtic Magazine of 1880–81.)
- Clarsach nam Beann. An ceathramh do-bhualadh, meudaichte agus ath-leasaichte. [With plates, including portraits.] Glasgow: Evan MacColl Memorial Committee, 1937.

=== Scores ===
- Màiri: for 16-part choir a cappella. James MacMillan; words by Evan MacColl; English translation by James MacMillan. Boosey & Hawkes, c2003. (English words, translated from the original Scottish Gaelic of Evan MacColl; also printed for reference with French and German translations preceding score.)
- Welcome, Snow. Text by Evan MacColl. Author: Joseph Roff 1910–. New York: Leeds Music Corporation, [1959].
- Suaicheantas na H-Alba, Gaelic text by Evan MacColl, translated by Malcolm MacFarlane as 'The Badge of Scotland' (more popularly known as 'The Thistle o' Scotland'), and accompaniment by Frederick W. Whitehead. Published in Songs of the Highlands, Inverness: Logan and Co., [1902].

=== Archives ===
- Archive material held by the Mitchell Library, Glasgow: 24 items donated by the Evan MacColl Memorial Committee in 1937. Miscellaneous handwritten, typescript and printed material by or relating to Evan MacColl; including letters, cuttings, photographs etc., mainly dating from the period of his life in Canada; also, a synopsis of a proposed biography by Alexander Fraser.

== Memorial ==
In 1930 a cairn on the shore of Loch Fyne was commemorated to MacColl.
