= George Pollard =

George Pollard may refer to:

- George Pollard (bowls) (1874–1963), New Zealand lawn bowls player
- George Pollard (painter) (1920–2008), American portrait painter
- George Pollard (politician) (1864–1937), British physician and politician
- George Pollard Jr. (1791–1882), captain of the whaleship Essex
- George Arthur Pollard (1863–1939), New Zealand salvation army officer and administrator
- Nick Pollard (born 1950, George Nicholas Pollard), British journalist and news executive
