= Fonseca House =

Neoclassical Building in Pontevedra, Spain

- Casa de los Fonseca
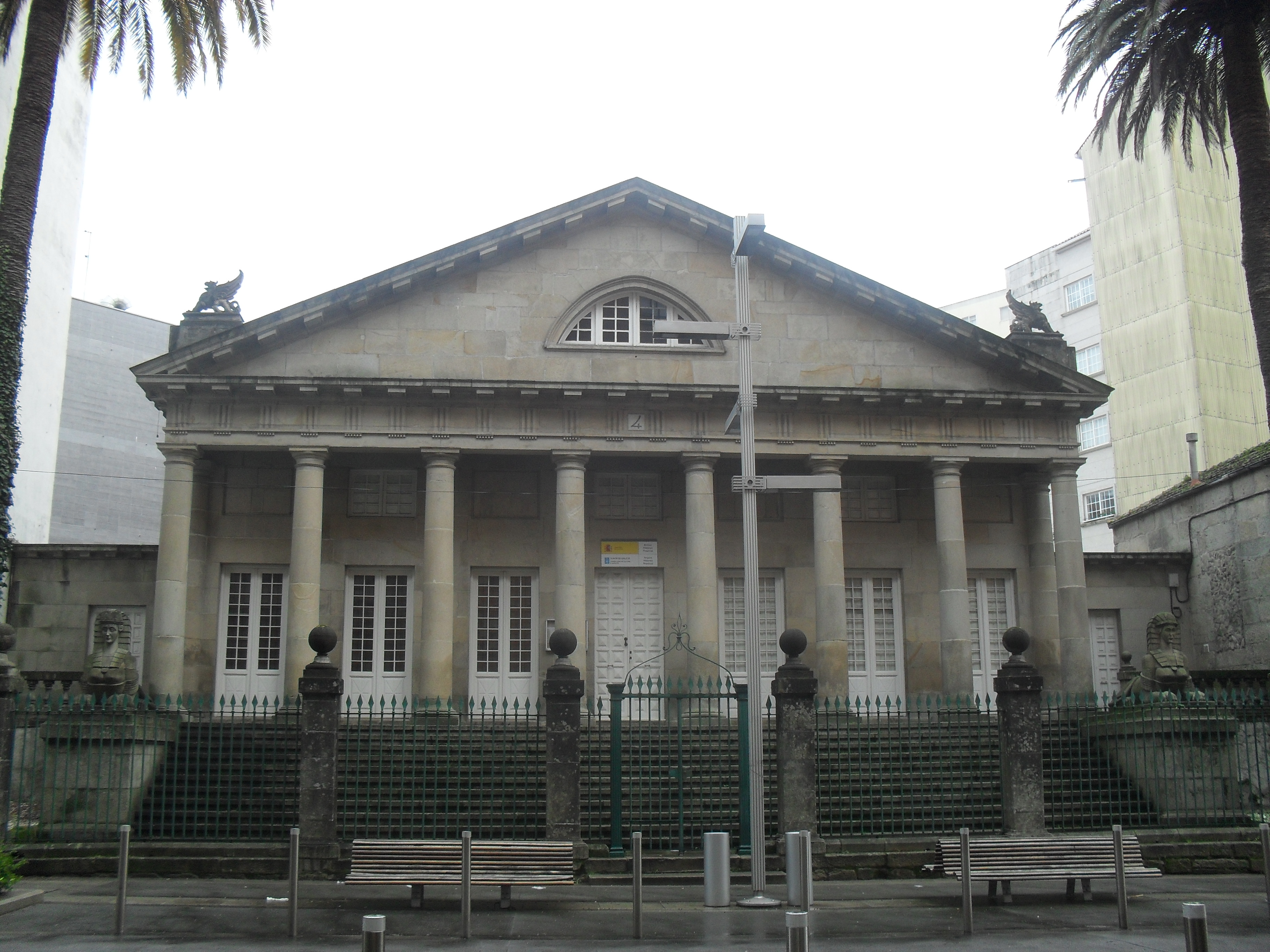
- Interactive map of the Fonseca House area
- Former names: Casa Dórica

General information
- Type: House
- Location: Pontevedra, Galicia, Spain
- Coordinates: 42°25′50.52″N 8°39′03.24″W
- Construction started: 1909
- Completed: 1910
- Owner: Ministry of Culture
- Management: Xunta de Galicia

Technical details
- Floor count: 2

Website
- arquivosdegalicia.xunta.gal/portal/arquivo-historico-provincial-de-pontevedra/content/el-archivo/index.html?lang=es%2F

The Fonseca House is a building on the Paseo de Colón in the city of Pontevedra, Spain. It is one of the most impressive historical buildings in the city, distinguished by its neoclassical architecture and by the two stone Sphinxes and two large Canary palm trees that flank its entrance. It is currently the headquarters of the Historical Archive of the Province of Pontevedra.

== History ==
The construction of the building began in 1909 and was completed in 1910. It was commissioned by Eulogio Fonseca, one of the rich businessmen of Pontevedra at the beginning of the 20th century, to whom the sawmill or the baths still present in the old photographs of A Moureira gave prestige and money. In 1910 it was the headquarters of the most important Masonic lodge in the city. In the noble hall, just behind the frontispiece, the members of the "Marcus Aurelius" lodge, linked to both Freemasonry and Theosophy, met. The house had a large estate at the back that reached as far as the restaurant El Castaño.

Eulogio Fonseca lived in the house, known as La Dorica until his death in 1924. The house was inherited by his son Luis Fonseca y Quintairos who moved to live in the Doric House in 1926 and the house became a meeting point for the society of the time. The house was later sold for two million pesetas due to its costly maintenance.

In 1955 the building was acquired by the Ministry of Education to house the Provincial Historical Archive and the Public Library since 1960. It was renovated by the Ministry of Culture between 1993 and 1996 and today it is only the seat of the Provincial Historical Archive of Pontevedra. The Provincial Historical Archive of Pontevedra was declared an Asset of Cultural Interest in 1985. The house holds nearly 9 kilometres of documents.

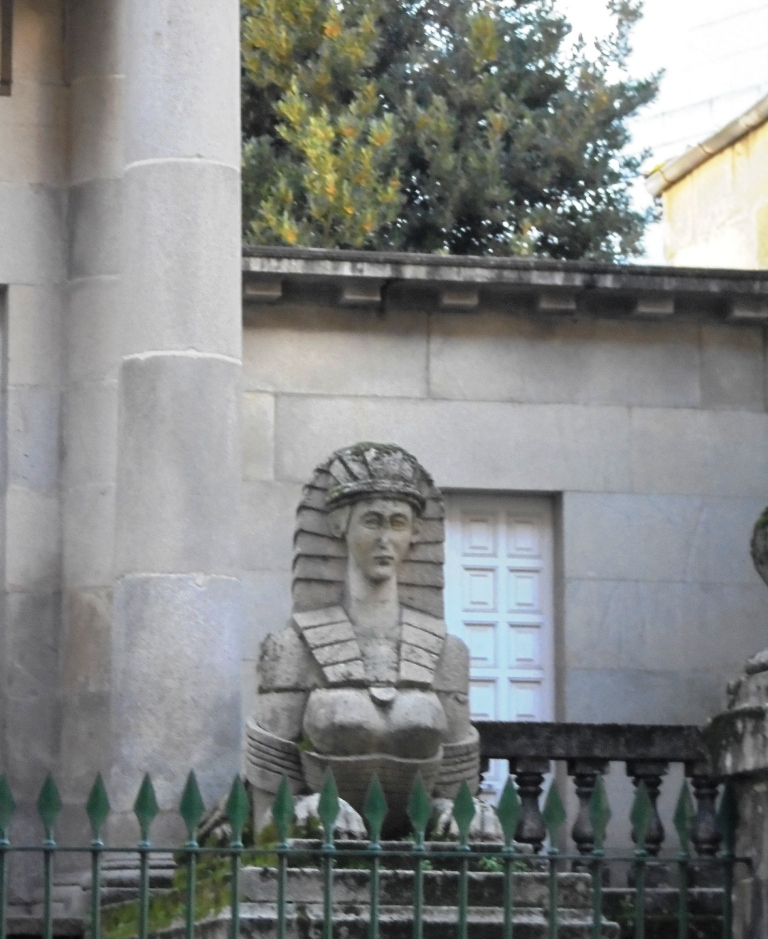
One of the Sphinxes that frame the façade

== Description ==
It is a great example of the sober and elegant neoclassical style. The building is accessed from the Paseo de Colón via a stone staircase, on either side of which are two Sphinxes with the head and chest of a woman and the body and feet of a lion that guard the entrance. With reminiscences of eclecticism and historicism, a strange conjunction of forms and elements can be observed in the building.

As for the architectural composition of the building, it represents the atrium of a typical temple of the classical order. The façade is neoclassical, with a large portico of eight Tuscan Roman columns, in the style of a Roman temple, which supports a large pediment opened by a semicircular window. On the pediment this semi-circular window is a clear reference to the Eye of Providence, known as the All-seeing eye, a symbol of Freemasonry. At the top, and on each side of the pediment, the façade is completed by two winged Griffins, which give it a French or Napoleonic air. The granite sphinxes, griffins and columns refer to mythological figures protecting places and spaces of wisdom. The building consists of two floors and a garret, in whose rooms the noble room behind the frontispiece stands out. The structure of the semicircular window room indicates that it was the site of Masonic meetings and rites in the city. It has a kind of altarpiece with a railing that presides over it.

On either side of the building's entrance is an Egyptian-influenced sphinx accompanied by large palm trees that frame the staircase and the classical entrance portico. The building was erected in imitation of a classical temple, such as the Madeleine Church in Paris or the Capitol in Washington. It has all the elements of this period: a grand entrance staircase, a colonnade on the Tuscan-order facade supporting an entablature that serves as a support for a triangular pediment.

== See also ==
=== Bibliography ===
- Aganzo, Carlos (2010). Pontevedra. Ciudades con encanto (in Spanish). Madrid: El País-Aguilar. pp. 90–91. ISBN 978-8403509344.
- Fontoira Surís, Rafael (2009). Pontevedra monumental (in Spanish). Pontevedra: Diputación Provincial de Pontevedra. p. 420. ISBN 978-84-8457-327-2.

=== Related articles ===
- Freemasonry in Spain
- Masonic Temple of Santa Cruz de Tenerife
