= Heckmondwike =

Town in West Yorkshire, England

Coordinates: 53.708°N 1.670°W

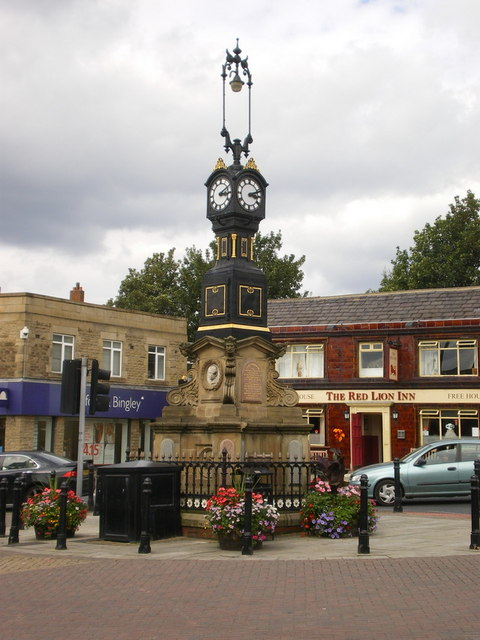
- Clock in Heckmondwike's centre, erected in 1863 to commemorate the marriage of the Prince of Wales and Princess Alexandra of Denmark.

- Location within West Yorkshire
- Population: 18,149
- OS grid reference: SE216234
- Metropolitan borough: Kirklees
- Metropolitan county: West Yorkshire
- Region: Yorkshire and the Humber
- Country: England
- Sovereign state: United Kingdom
- Post town: HECKMONDWIKE
- Postcode district: WF16
- Dialling code: 01924
- Police: West Yorkshire
- Fire: West Yorkshire
- Ambulance: Yorkshire
- UK Parliament: Spen Valley

Heckmondwike is a town in the Kirklees district, West Yorkshire, England, 9 miles (14 km) south west of Leeds. Historically part of the West Riding of Yorkshire, it is close to Cleckheaton and Liversedge. It is in the Spen Valley parliamentary constituency, and had an estimated population of 16,986 at the 2011 Census increasing to 18,149 at the 2021 Census. Heckmondwike forms part of the Heavy Woollen District.

== Toponymy ==
The origins of Heckmondwike are in Old English. First recorded as Hedmundewic [sic] in the Domesday Book of 1086, Hedmundewic in 1166, and as Hecmundewik sometime in the 13th century, the name seems to be from *Hēahmundes wīc, or 'Heahmund's dairy-farm'.

== History ==
During Saxon times, Heckmondwike was a berewick or independent village in the manor of Gomersal, which, before 1066, was held by Dunstan and Gamel.

The Poll Tax of 1379 records seven families in Heckmondwike, about 35 people: including one named Thomas of Stubly. Most lived in isolated farmsteads such as Stubley Farm, on high ground overlooking the marshy Spen Valley floor.

In 1684, there were around 250 people, occupying 50 houses, in the town. The town became famous for manufacturing blankets, and by 1811 the Blanket Hall was built for trade in the town's primary manufacture. It was replaced by a second hall erected in 1839, on Blanket Hall Street in the town centre. Elizabeth Gaskell's biography of Charlotte Brontë in 1857 described the inhabitants of Heckmondwike as "a chapel-going people, very critical of their sermons, tyrannical to their ministers and violent radicals".

The town ceased generating electricity in 1924. The Power Company buildings survive in part on Bath Road. The remains of the first Blanket Hall were demolished in spring 2008, along with a number of other old buildings including some former Co-op buildings that had been used as the post office and former "George" public house.

A health centre was opened in July 2010 to house two former doctors' practices.

== Geography ==
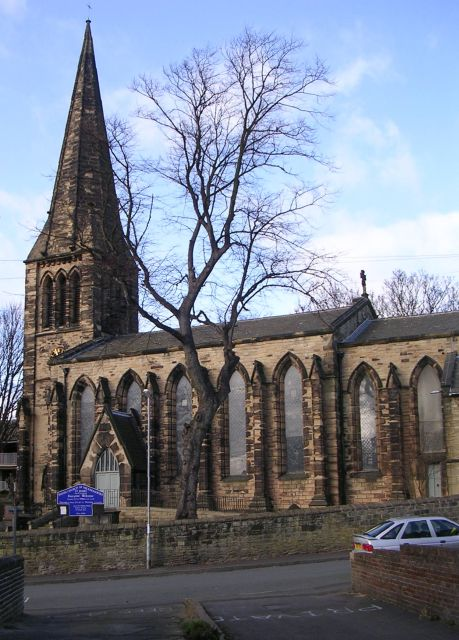
St James's Church (Church of England)

Located at the edge of the Pennine hills, the land rises to the north, east and south of the town centre. The town covers an area of one square mile (640 acres), the town boundary is not the same as the ward boundary.

Heckmondwike has a telephone exchange, north of High Street in the Wakefield 01924 dialling area. The exchange covers Liversedge, and parts of Dewsbury Moor and Staincliffe.

== Politics ==
In 1894 Heckmondwike Urban District Council was established and was incorporated into Kirklees in the local government reorganisation of 1974. The Heckmondwike electoral ward includes Millbridge, Flush, and Norristhorpe in Liversedge south of the A62 road. Heckmondwike ward is represented on Kirklees Council by three Labour councillors.

In 2003 the ward elected David Exley of the British National Party, after the serving councillor left the Labour Party to run as an independent. Exley was re-elected in 2004, and in 2006 a second BNP member, Roger Roberts, was elected. Roberts had previously served as councillor for the Conservative Party. In May 2007 David Sheard (Labour), was returned. In May 2008 Exley lost his seat to Labour candidate Steve Hall. In May 2010 Roberts lost his seat to Labour candidate Viv Kendrick. Sheard was re-elected in 2011, and Hall was re-elected in 2012.

Since the 2026 Local Council elections, Heckmondwike has been represented on Kirklees Council by three Reform UK councillors: Simon Holbrook, Glennis-Anne Harrison and Lee Konrad Cliff.

== Media ==
The weekly newspaper was the Heckmondwike Herald until Friday 15 August 2008 after which the title was merged into the Spenborough Guardian incorporating the Heckmondwike Herald. It covers the former Spenborough Urban District and Heckmondwike.

Local news and television programmes are provided by BBC Yorkshire and ITV Yorkshire. Television signals are received from the Emley Moor TV transmitter.

Local radio stations are BBC Radio Leeds on 92.4 FM, Heart Yorkshire on 106.2 FM, Capital Yorkshire on 105.6 FM, Hits Radio West Yorkshire on 102.5 FM, Greatest Hits Radio West Yorkshire on 96.3 FM and Branch Radio, a community based radio station that broadcast from the Dewsbury on 101.8 FM.

== Transport ==
The town has its own bus station. Very few bus services terminate at Heckmondwike; most are through services from across West Yorkshire including Leeds, Bradford, Huddersfield and Wakefield.

== Notable people ==
- James Berry (1852–1913), executioner
- Horace Brearley (1913–2007), cricketer and schoolmaster
- Jeff Butterfield (1929–2004), international rugby union footballer.
- Jo Cox (1974–2016), Labour MP
- John Curwen (1816–1880), Congregationalist minister who founded the Tonic Sol-fa system of music education; Curwen Crescent and Curwen Park in the town are named for him.
- Thomas Fearnley (1729–1798), merchant, who emigrated to Norway and was ancestor of the Norwegian family of shipping magnates
- Mabel Ferrett (1917–2011), poet, publisher, literary editor and local historian
- Mike Heaton (born 1967), drummer for post-Britpop band Embrace.
- John Henry Hirst (1826–1882), architect, born in Heckmondwike, practised in Bristol and Harrogate
- Kim Leadbeater (born 1976), Labour MP
- The Rt Rev. John Monsignor O'Connor (1870–1952), an Irish Catholic priest who served as Parish Priest of Heckmondwike from 1909 to 1919. He was the inspiration for Father Brown, the fictional character created by G. K. Chesterton (1874–1936). While serving in Heckmondwike, the then Father O'Connor had the Church of the Holy Spirit constructed. The church was completed in 1915.
- George Arthur Pollard (1863–1939), New Zealand salvation army officer and administrator
- Dave Pybus (born 1970), bassist member of extreme metal band, Cradle of Filth.
- Frederick Wilson Whitehead (1863–1926), composer and organist.
- Arthur Wood (1875–1953), composer famous for the 1924 piece, Barwick Green, which is used as the theme song for the BBC Radio 4 series, The Archers.

== See also ==
- Listed buildings in Heckmondwike
- Sugden Audio
