= Braveheart (soundtrack) =

Soundtrack album by James Horner
- Released: May 1995
- Genre: Film score
- Length: 77:55
- Label: Decca Records
- Producer: James Horner

Braveheart – Original Motion Picture Soundtrack is the instrumental soundtrack album to the 1995 film of the same name composed and conducted by James Horner and performed by the London Symphony Orchestra. It is Horner's second of three collaborations with Mel Gibson as director following The Man Without a Face (1993). The soundtrack, comprising 77 minutes of film score, was successful and was nominated for Best Original Score at the 68th Academy Awards in 1996.

Horner's score includes a melody that appeared again in his 1997 music for Titanic. Irish band Clannad wrote a theme tune for the film, entitled 'Croí Cróga' (meaning 'braveheart'). However, the track was not used in the soundtrack, but was released by Clannad on the album 'Lore'.

== Track listing ==
No.	Title	Length
1.	"Main Title"	2:51
2.	"A Gift of a Thistle - Extra Bag Pipes performed by Tom Tunstall."	1:38
3.	"Wallace Courts Murron"	4:25
4.	"The Secret Wedding"	6:33
5.	"Attack on Murron"	3:00
6.	"Revenge"	6:24
7.	"Murron's Burial"	2:14
8.	"Making Plans / Gathering the Clans"	1:52
9.	"'Sons of Scotland'"	6:20
10.	"The Battle of Stirling"	5:57
11.	"For the Love of a Princess"	4:07
12.	"Falkirk"	4:04
13.	"Betrayal & Desolation"	7:48
14.	"Mornay's Dream"	1:16
15.	"The Legend Spreads"	1:09
16.	"The Princess Pleads for Wallace's Life"	3:38
17.	"'Freedom' / The Execution / Bannockburn"	7:24
18.	"End Credits"	7:15

=== Weekly charts ===
Chart (1995/96)	Peak position
Australian Albums (ARIA)	66

==== Year-end charts ====
Chart (1996)	Position
Australian Albums (ARIA)	89

=== Certifications ===
Region	Certification	Certified units/sales
Australia (ARIA)	Platinum	70,000^{^}
Canada (Music Canada)	Platinum	100,000^{^}
France (SNEP)	Gold	100,000^{*}
Poland (ZPAV)	Gold	50,000^{*}
Spain (Promusicae)	Platinum	100,000^{^}
United Kingdom (BPI)	Gold	100,000^{^}
United States (RIAA)	Platinum	1,320,000
Summaries
Europe (IFPI)	Platinum	1,000,000^{*}
^{*} Sales figures based on certification alone.^{^} Shipments figures based on certification alone.

== More Music from Braveheart (1997) ==
In 1997, album co-producer Simon Rhodes produced a follow-up soundtrack entitled More Music from Braveheart. This album features many unreleased cues, source music, and dialogue from the film.

No.	Title	Length
1.	"Prologue: 'I Shall Tell You of William Wallace' (Narration: Robert the Bruce)"	3:35
2.	"Outlawed Tunes on Outlawed Pipes*"	2:03
3.	"The Royal Wedding (Narration: Robert the Bruce)*"	2:13
4.	"'The trouble with Scotland' (King Edward the Longshanks)"	0:41
5.	"Scottish Wedding Music*"	1:14
6.	"Prima Noctes"	1:46
7.	"The Proposal (William Wallace and Murron)"	6:32
8.	"'Scotland is free!' (William Wallace)"	0:18
9.	"Point of War / Johnny Cope / Up in the Morning Early"	3:00
10.	"Conversing with the Almighty (Stephen, William Wallace, Hamish, Campbell)"	1:20
11.	"The Road to the Isles / Glendaruel Highlanders / The Old Rustic Bridge by the Mill"	3:52
12.	"'Sons of Scotland!' (William Wallace)"	12:10
13.	"Vision of Murron*"	1:45
14.	"'Unite the clans!' (William Wallace)"	0:23
15.	"The Legend Spreads (Scottish Highlanders)"	1:07
16.	"'Why do you help me?' (William Wallace and Princess Isabelle)"	0:38
17.	"For the Love of a Princess"	4:07
18.	"'Not every man really lives' (William Wallace and Princess Isabelle)"	4:11
19.	"'The prisoner wishes to say a word' (The Executioner and William Wallace)"	3:43
20.	"'After the beheading' (Robert the Bruce)"	1:48
21.	"'You have bled with Wallace!' (Robert the Bruce)"	1:23
22.	"Warrior Poets (William Wallace)"	0:29
23.	"Scotland the Brave / The Badge of Scotland / The Meeting of the Waters"	2:48
24.	"Leaving Glen Urquhart / The Highland Plaid / Jock Wilson's Ball"	3:33
25.	"Kirkhill / The Argyllshire Gathering / The Braemar Highland Gathering"	4:09

- Previously unreleased

== Limited Edition ==
In November 2015, in commemoration for the film's 20th anniversary, La-La Land Records produced a 2-disc limited edition album of James Horner's complete score to Braveheart. The album's original release was limited to 3,000 copies and is currently sold out. However, La-La Land Records re-issued the score for another 3,000 copies on March 29, 2022.

The album is dedicated to Horner who was killed in a plane accident prior to the album's release.

Disc 1
No.	Title	Length
1.	"Logo / Main Title"	3:38
2.	"Hanging of the Peacemakers*"	1:21
3.	"William's Father Leaves to Fight*"	0:59
4.	"A Father's Final Return*"	2:56
5.	"A Gift of a Thistle"	1:39
6.	"Outlawed Tunes on Outlawed Pipes"	2:06
7.	"Royal Wedding* / Domino Fidelium"	2:10
8.	"Grown Wallace Arrives*"	1:19
9.	"Prima Noctes"	1:58
10.	"Wallace Courts Murron"	4:29
11.	"The Secret Wedding"	6:36
12.	"Attack on Murron"	3:02
13.	"Revenge (extended version)+"	6:18
14.	"Murron's Burial"	2:17
15.	"Wallace on the Move* / Run to the Stronghold*"	3:26
16.	"Making Plans / Gathering the Clans (extended version)+"	2:13
17.	"Sons of Scotland"	6:22
18.	"The Battle of Stirling (extended version)+"	6:18
19.	"Wallace Moves on York*"	1:25
20.	"Wallace's Dream*"	2:13
21.	"Vision of Murron"	1:55
22.	"The Princess Was a Pawn* / Wallace Moves Again*"	2:38

Disc 2
No.	Title	Length
1.	"Falkirk"	4:08
2.	"Betrayal and Desolation"	7:51
3.	"Mornay's Dream"	1:19
4.	"The Legend Spreads*"	1:13
5.	"The Fire Trap*"	1:16
6.	"Romantic Alliance*"	2:25
7.	"Wallace Is Caught*"	1:43
8.	"The Princess Pleads for Wallace's Life (film version)*"	3:39
9.	"Wallace to the Scaffold*"	1:22
10.	"'Freedom' / The Execution / Bannockburn"	7:23
11.	"End Credits"	7:15
12.	"For the Love of a Princess"	4:11
13.	"Scottish Wedding Music*"	1:25
14.	"Drum Roll* / Sleepy Maggy*"	1:13
15.	"Main Title (album version)"	2:55
16.	"Sons of Scotland (alternate)+"	6:21
17.	"The Battle of Stirling (alternate opening)*"	2:06
18.	"The Princess Pleads for Wallace's Life (album version)"	3:43

+: Contains previously unreleased material
*: Previously unreleased

== Personnel ==
- Tony Hinnegan – kena & whistle
- Eric Rigler – Uileann pipes
- Mike Taylor – bodhrán & whistle
- Ian Underwood – synth programming
- James Horner – orchestrations, producer
