= Freemasonry in Spain =

Freemasonry in Spain (Spanish: Masonería) is first recorded in 1728, in an English lodge. As various papal bulls condemned Freemasonry the Spanish Inquisition did their best to close lodges and demonise Freemasons, therefore the success of Freemasonry from year to year depended on the sympathy or antipathy of the ruling regime. Nevertheless, lodges and even Grand Lodges were formed, and even thrived during more liberal periods. When Francisco Franco consolidated power in 1939, all Freemasonry was banned. In 1979, four years after Franco's death, bans on Freemasonry were declared unconstitutional, and several Grand Lodges and Orients now flourish in Spain.

== History ==
=== Early Lodges ===
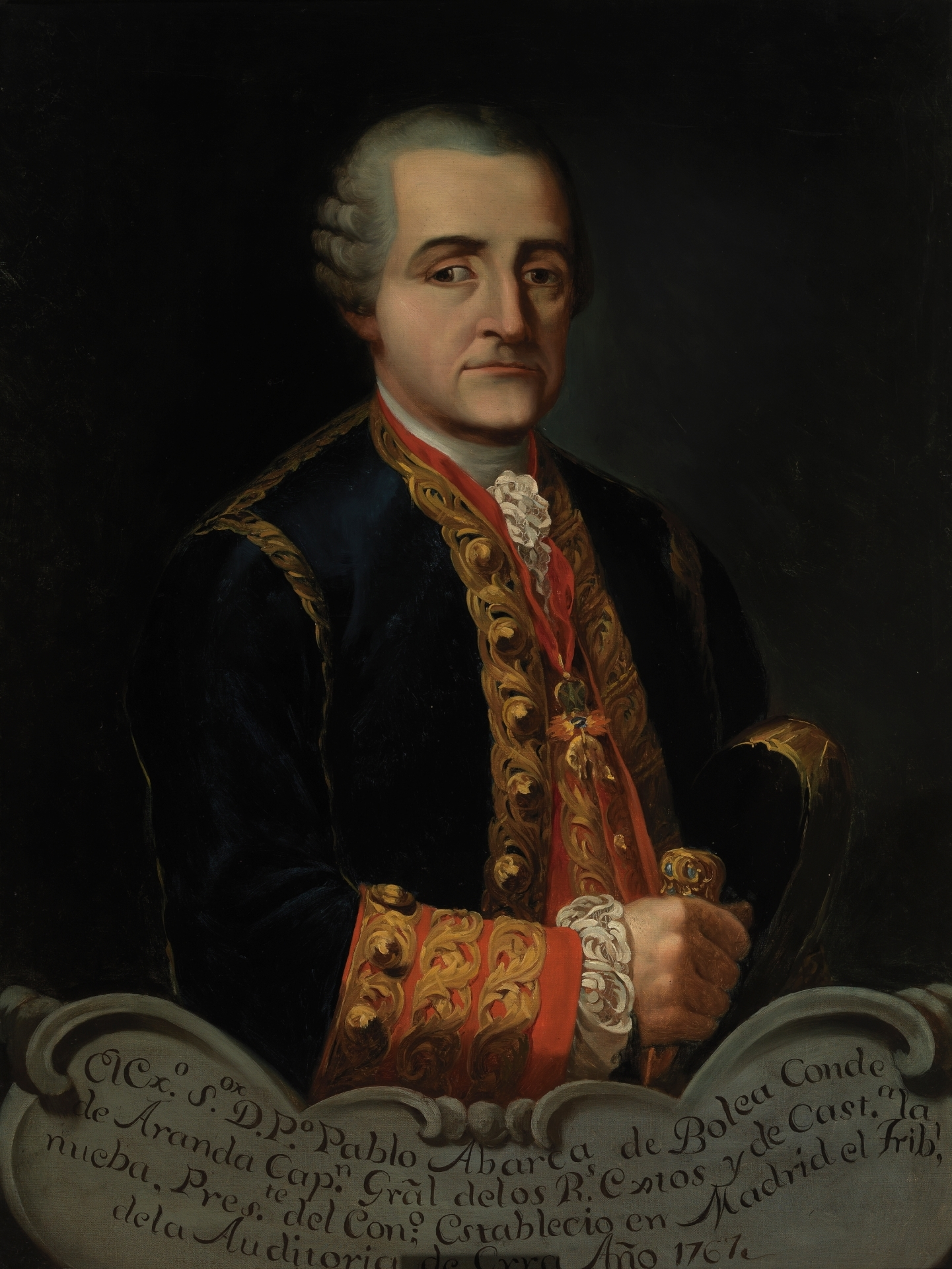
Portrait of the Count of Aranda by Francisco Jover y Casanova

On 15 February 1728, a Lodge named La Matritense or Las Tres Flores de Lys, probably after the name of the hotel in which it met, was formed on the Via San Bernardo in Madrid. It met in the apartments of a Past Grand Master of England, the Duke of Wharton, with Charles de Labelye as Master. This lodge was granted a Warrant by the Grand Lodge of England on 29 March 1729, the Lodge being placed on the Roll as No. 50.

In the same year, 1728, the Lodge of St. John of Jerusalem was constituted at Gibraltar and later placed on the Roll of the Grand Lodge of England as No. 51. In 1731, Captain James Cummerford, then serving with the British Army in Gibraltar, was appointed Provincial Grand Master for Andalusia, by which was meant Gibraltar and adjacent places. Gibraltar had been, since 1713, under British control and this Provincial Grand Lodge of Andalusia went on to form lodges throughout southern Spain.

Initially, the membership of Masonic Lodges in Spain consisted of expatriates from Britain and France, but it was not long before Spaniards began to join. In spite of this, for most of the eighteenth century no organized and stable masonry arose in Spain. The few lodges that were founded had a brief and precarious life because the Spanish Inquisition were quick to prosecute, enforcing the papal bulls and the decree of Fernando VI on 2 July 1751 banning Freemasonry. For example, the military lodge founded in Barcelona in 1748 that had begun in Nice was denounced to the Inquisition just two years later and closed down. It was reorganized in 1776, but again the Inquisition stamped it out and arrested all its leaders.

In 1767, a Grand Lodge of Spain (Gran Logia Española) was formed, and Spanish Freemasonry declared itself independent from England. The first Grand Master was the Count of Aranda, Prime Minister of Charles III. In 1780, the name of this body was changed to the Gran Oriente Espanola, and it adopted the French system. It is known that many of the ministers of Charles III were Freemasons along with an impressive list of prominent Spanish nobles and high officials. In 1800, under the direction of the successor of Aranda, the Count of Montijo, the Grand Orient had 400 lodges.

==== Condemnation and persecution ====
As Freemasonry grew in Spain, it aroused the suspicions and hostility of both the Church and the secular authorities. On 28 April 1738, Pope Clement issued In eminenti apostolatus, condemning Freemasonry and forbidding Catholics from joining. In Spain, the encyclical received the royal exequatur and the Inquisitor-general published an edict dated 11 October 1738, claiming exclusive jurisdiction on the matter and called for denunciations within six days under pain of excommunication and a fine of 200 ducats.

In 1752, a year after the promulgation of the Royal Decree which outlawed Freemasonry, Franciscan Father José Torrubia published A Guard against Freemasons (Centinela contra francmasones), a collection of anti-Masonic foreign texts. Freemasonry was anathema to Spanish Catholicism, and became associated with terms such as "heresy", "Jewish", "atheist", "Jansenist" and "Manichaean". The frequent use of these words to refer to the Masons explains why it was not until 1843 that the term Freemasonry appeared in the Dictionary of the Royal Spanish Academy as "secret association, in which several symbols taken from the masonry, such as squares, levels, etc are used."

=== Reign of Ferdinand VII (1808–1833) ===
With the invasion of the Napoleonic troops in 1808 lodges appeared which were instruments of Napoleonic policy. Barcelona had six, one of which was significantly called "Faithful Friends of Napoleon", and were mainly composed of military Frenchmen. This kind of Bonapartist Freemasonry disappeared when French troops left the country in 1813

As well as lodges supporting the "French" monarchy of Joseph Bonaparte in Spain, there were also "Patriot" Lodges which did not recognize the abdication of Bayonne and therefore still regarded Ferdinand VII as their rightful king. Anti-Masonic newspapers arose such as the Sun of Cádiz (1812–1813) which stated that, "A pernicious caste of men has spread all over Spain, who want nothing more than the subversion of the state and suppression of religion". Another myth arose concerning the Mason's nocturnal activities. An article published in 1812 contains the warning, "People of Málaga, flee these predatory evening wolves." The 18th century antimasonic diatribe continued unchanged.

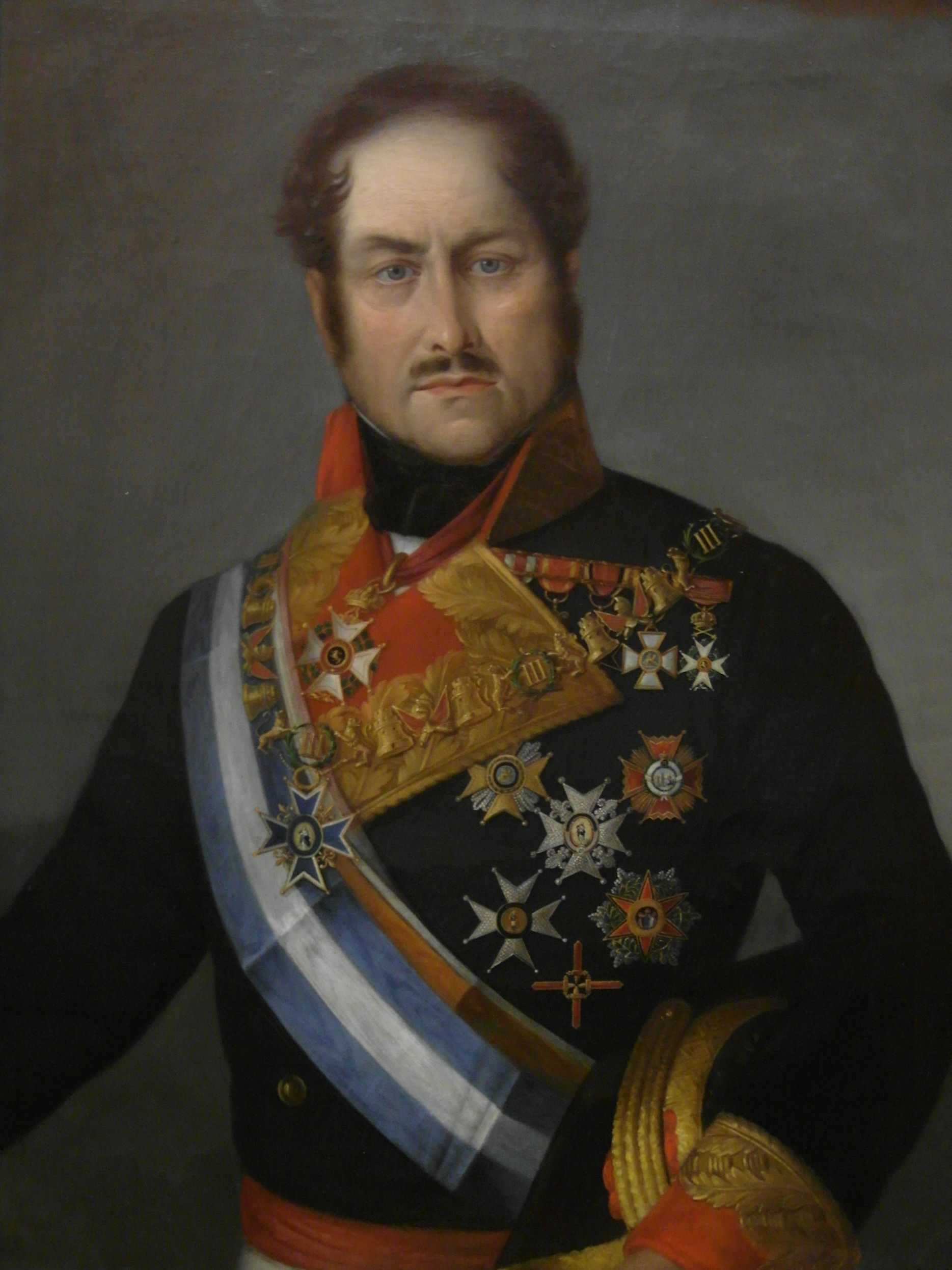
Portrait of Juan Van Halen, anonymous work of 1853, Museo Naval de Madrid.

After the 1814 restoration of absolute monarchy by Ferdinand, persecution of Freemasonry by the Spanish Inquisition reached its peak.The new Grand Inquisitor, Bishop Mier y Campillo, one of whose obsessions was Freemasonry, issued two edicts in early 1815 following the directives of the Holy See. Mier accused Masons of plotting "not only against thrones, but greatly against religion" and encouraged people to betray them, guaranteeing anonymity. The confiscation of the property of Freemasons was also included. There were many complaints, some false, and confessions, which led to the closure of lodges. Foreign Masons were expelled from Spain and the Spaniards were forced to undergo spiritual exercises. However, there were Masons who did not receive such lenient treatment. Such was the case of the liberal military officer Juan Van Halen. In 1817 he was tortured for two days after being arrested by the Inquisition. Van Halen's own account of the experience, narrated ten years later, is examined in Pío Baroja's book Juan van Halen, the adventurous official (Juan van Halen, el oficial aventurero)

The lists of suspected Masons then made (many kept by the king) were a useful tool in the hands of powerful politicians to get rid of opponents, many of whom may not have been Freemasons, according to Emilio La Parra and Maria Angeles Casado.

Freemasonry reappears in the Liberal Triennium, and develops a political role. It was repressed again during the Ominous Decade. In 1824 Fernando VII enacted a Royal Charter prohibiting "In the domains of Spain and the Indies, all congregations of Freemasons, rebels (Sp:communeros) and other secret sects."

The height to which the anti-Masonic paranoia could rise is illustrated by "Notions about Freemasonry" a little book published in 1828 that states;

The Congregation of the Freemasons is a military order, estimated to contain a million men, which if necessary can call upon and be assisted by another two million new brothers and friends. [...] All the individuals of that congregation are armed with a hammer.

=== Reign of Isabel II (1833–1868) ===
In 1834 the regency of María Cristina de Borbón decreed an amnesty for Freemasons but maintained the ban on Freemasonry. Shortly after this the National Grand Orient of Spain was founded in Lisbon and in 1839 the Sovereign Departmental Chapter in Barcelona, dependent on the Grand Orient.

During this period Freemasonry remained hidden, which did not prevent it from gaining momentum during the Progressivist biennium (1854–1856), especially in Cuba, where some Masonic lodges participated in the independence movement, as had happened when the American colonies were emancipated from Spain between 1810 and 1825

=== Six years of Democracy (1868–1874) ===
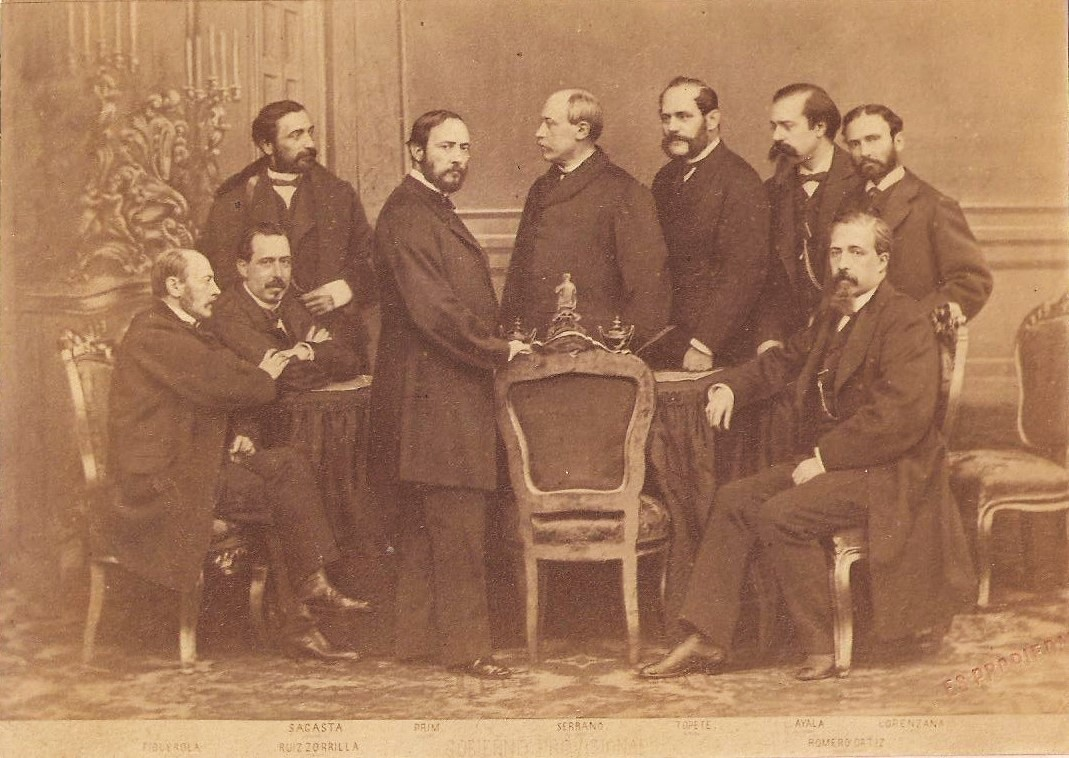
Provisional Government of 1869 From left: Laureano Figuerola, Manuel Ruiz Zorrilla, Práxedes Mateo Sagasta, Juan Prim, Francisco Serrano y Dominguez, Juan Bautista Topete, Adelardo López de Ayala, Juan Alvarez Lorenzana and Antonio Romero Ortiz. Zorilla, Sagasta and Prim are Freemasons.

Freemasonry expanded during the Six years of Democracy. Although lodges proliferated, taking advantage of the freedom proclaimed by the revolution of 1868, conflicts arose between the two allegiances, the National Grand Orient of Spain and the Grand Orient of Spain. The latter was more democratic and counted Manuel Ruiz Zorrilla as Grand Master. One of the most prominent politicians of his day, he was prime minister in 1872-1873 during the reign of Amadeo I. In 1876 he replaced Práxedes Mateo Sagasta, another prominent politician of the time and one of the pillars, along with Canovas del Castillo, of the Bourbon Restoration in Spain. That same year, 1876 a Senator, the Marquis de Seoane emerged to lead the conservative National Grand Orient of Spain.

During this period Masons could come forward and express their views publicly. The May 1, 1871 the "Official Bulletin of the Grand Orient of Spain" began to publish, and the following year Masonic Pocket Dictionary of Pertusa was published. In the latter work it was said that Freemasonry was an association of free men of good character, which has the sole and exclusive purpose of social betterment of mankind.

According to Pere Sánchez, "This was a masonry with a very thinly veiled political vocation in which not a few characters used its structure and their influence to climb to power and prestige within it, which (it is fair to say) met no opposition if the politician in question would favour their interests. It is no exaggeration to say that some of them would complete the 33 degrees (of the Scottish Rite) in three days and many others, who held important positions, hardly knew anything about the Freemasonry and did not attend rituals. Progressive ideology and bourgeois membership was then the prototype of Latin Freemasonry, which had quite different characteristics from Anglo Freemasonry, such as militant anticlericalism or supporting certain political revolutions. This Freemasonry, typical of Latin Europe, espoused positivism and universal suffrage in the second half of the nineteenth century, and some of these obediences even removed from their statutes the obligation to recognize the existence of the Great Architect of the Universe (God).

Anti-masonry also flourished during this period. Some expressed their dismay that "a charitable, moral institution of civilizing character" had to be "veiled in mystery" and concluded:

Since Freemasonry is systematically hidden from the eyes of all, the institution's work and may not represent that which is good and true

=== Bourbon Restoration (1875–1902) ===
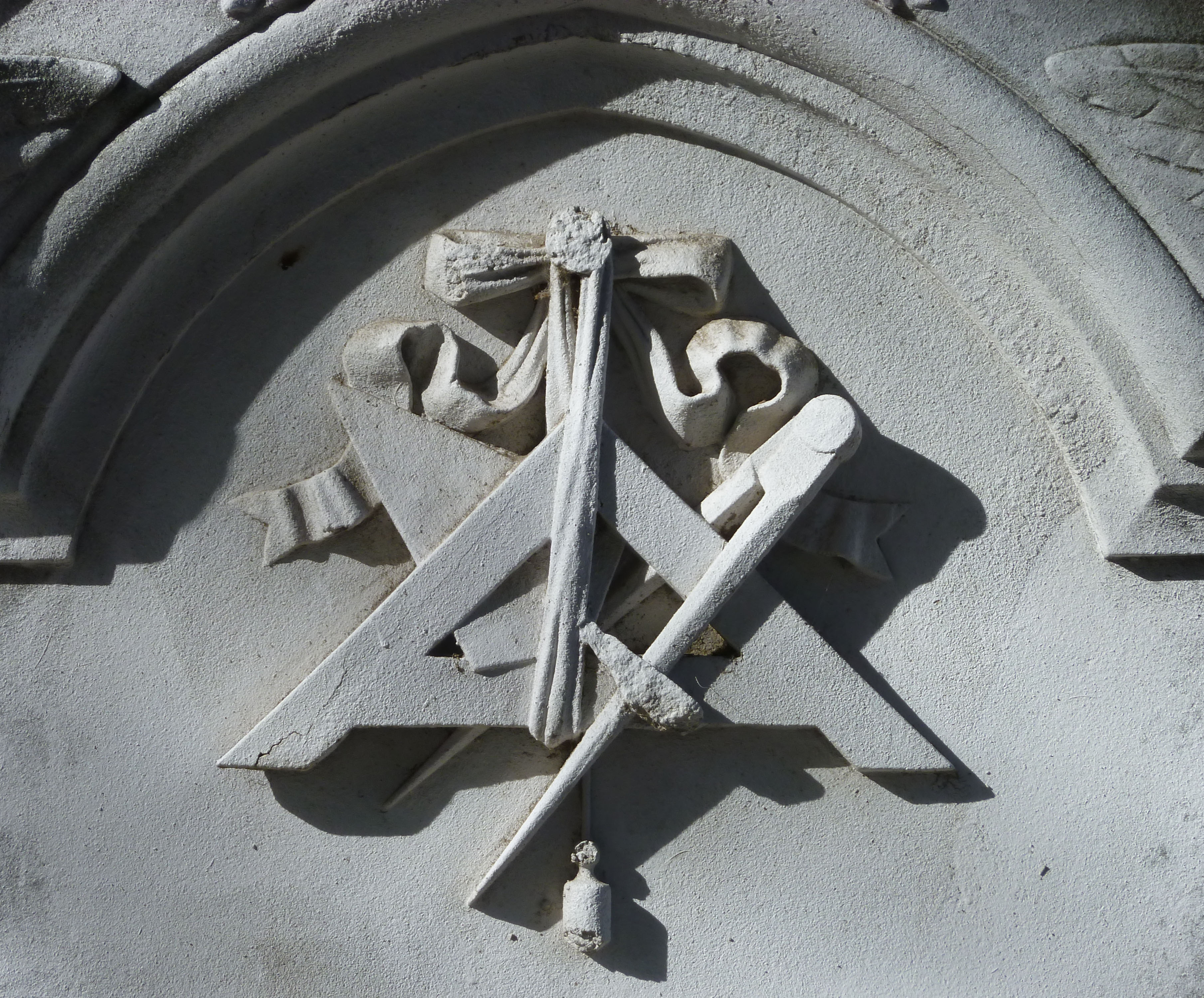
Detail of the tomb of Figueroa (1878) family in La Almudena Cemetery, Madrid

The "golden age" of Spanish Freemasonry which began in the "Six years" lasted through the Bourbon Restoration. For example, in Barcelona where there were more than forty active lodges in 1890, various Masonic journals were published which raised money for charitable funds to would relieve the families of deceased Freemasons, helping in case of illness and providing a medical assistance. Founded in 1889 the Grand Orient of Spain, chaired by Miguel Morayta. In Catalonia hegemony was shared with Symbolic Grand Lodge of the Balearic Catalan Region, which supported Catalan nationalism. Created three years previously this was the first mainland obedience not to force its members to recognise the existence of the Great Architect of the Universe.

During these years anti-Masonry also expanded, stimulated by the Catholic Church. In 1884 Leo XIII publishes the encyclical Humanum genus, which again condemns Freemasonry and views it as it one of the main enemies of the Church. According to Pere Sánchez, "the reasons for such a forceful attack were of different types. At one level, Freemasonry had spiritually disavowed Catholicism, seeming to be a surrogate religion, without dogmas, which would replace Catholicism. If that were not enough to ensure enmity, it called for concordats, secular education, public cemeteries, abolition of regular clergy and Jesuits, political liberty, etc. For Freemasonry anticlericalism became one of the basic pillars of its engagement in politics and society." An example of this anti-Masonic campaign is a work published in 1899 by the Valencian fundamentalist Manuel Polo y Peyrolón, in which he said the following about Freemasonry:

Masonry is a monster who conspires in the Caverns of Adoniram to commit all kinds of felonys and crimes; is the Deus ex Machina of all murders, poisonings, regicides, persecutions against the Altar, the Throne and Fatherland, wars, political crises, slander, revenge, sacrileges, mysteries of iniquity, worship of Lucifer and Palladio, and also of the more horrible mysterious, diabolical, criminal and nefarious occurrences which have happened and are happening in the world

.

The paradox of the attack of the Catholic Church and Catholic fundamentalists on Freemasonry was that it was reinforced in his belief that "in the world two great forces vie for supremacy. On one side we the Jesuits, authentic representatives of past, present and future tyrannies. On other side Freemasonry, the undisputed cradle of freedom and human charity" according to an article published in the Bulletin of the Spanish Grand Orient in 1907.

Between 1869 and the end of the 19th century the Spanish masonic obediences created 200 new regular lodges in Cuba, of which near a half was located central capital. This climate of increasing antimasonry explains why, when the Cuban and Philippine insurrections occurred in 1896, Masonry was accused of collaborating with the independence movement, and the police closed the Madrid headquarters of the Grand Orient of Spain and the National Grand Orient of Spain, confiscating all their documentation and arresting some leaders. This political pressure, alongside internal reasons, explains the crisis that Freemasonry faced at the turn of the century, after which it never regained the "golden age" of the late nineteenth century. For example, in 1920 the number of lodges in Barcelona did not exceed a dozen.

=== Constitutional Monarchy of Alfonso XIII and dictatorship of Primo de Rivera (1902–1930) ===
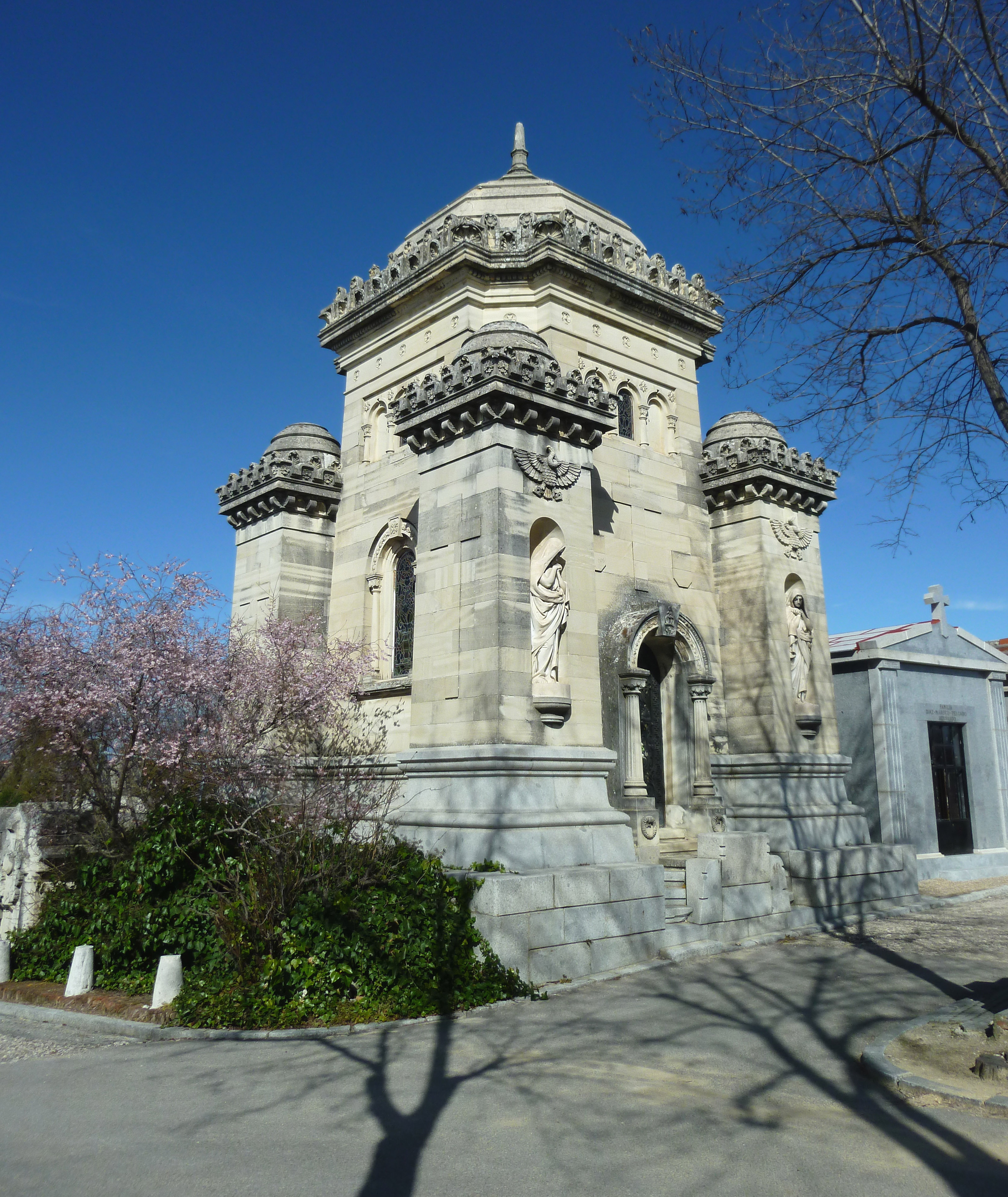
Masonic Mausoleum of the Viscounts of Llanteno, Madrid (built in 1910).

Masonry was no stranger to the political conflicts that existed in Spain in the early decades of the twentieth century. Perhaps the greatest impact on the organization was the "regional matter" in which two conceptions of the Spanish State, the centralist and federalist faced each another. Thus the Grand Orient of Spain defended a central Madrid-based model while the Symbolic Grand Lodge Balearic Regional Catalano favoured federalism, which led them to operate throughout Spain from 1921 under the new name of the Spanish Grand Lodge, threatening the hegemony which the Spanish Grand Orient had enjoyed. It attempted to follow the model of the United States, so set out to create an independent Grand Lodge in each region of the Iberian peninsula, including Portugal. Two years later, at the request of their Catalan lodges, the Grand Orient acquired a similar structure. The organization in Catalonia, for example, was renamed Grand Lodge of Northeast Spain.

On the other hand, in the first third of the twentieth century, lodges ceased to be exclusively middle class, incorporating a very few working class members. The pioneers were some Catalan anarchists who, since the late nineteenth had been infiltrating Masonic societies. Some leaders of the Federación de Trabajadores de la Región Español, amongst whom Anselmo Lorenzo figured prominently maintained intense activity from 1883 in Sons of Labour lodge in Barcelona. Lorenzo then became Master and Orator in Loyalty lodge. However, after the triumph of the October Revolution 1917 in Russia, the 1921 Third International under the Bolsheviks banned associated parties from belonging to Freemasonry, as a "bourgeois institution". That same year the Catalan lodges Loyalty (which, the following year admitted Lluís Companys) and Phoenix, part of the Grand Orient, published a booklet endorsed by Manuel Portela Valladares condemning the Third International.

The repressive policy of the dictatorship of Primo de Rivera regarding Freemasonry has been described as arbitrary and inconsistent. For example, while Freemasons in Madrid held a National Assembly in May 1927, many Catalan lodges were closed and some of their members imprisoned. During that time the Grand Orient remained dominant with over a hundred lodges, although the Grand Lodge had over fifty.

=== Second Spanish Republic (1931–1936) ===
The proclamation of the Second Spanish Republic opened a new chapter in the history of Spanish Freemasonry. The subsequent Francoist propaganda would discount the Republic, arguing that it was the work of Freemasons. It is true that in there were a significant number of deputies in the constituent assembly who were members of a Masonic lodge, but they did not constitute a majority. Ferrer Benimeli calculates 183 of a total of 458 deputies were Masons, mainly in leftist Republican parties. In Republican Left of Catalonia, 10 out of 26 deputies were Masons, in Republican Action 19 out of 28, in the Radical-Socialist Party 34 out of 54, in various federal factions, 48 out of 89 and from the Spanish Socialist Workers Party 44 out of 119. In the Provisional Government of the Second Spanish Republic six of the eleven ministers were Masons. However, these data, according to Pere Sánchez, "can not show that Masons formed a bloc of uniform policy or practice. Spanish Freemasonry can not therefore be considered as a pressure group in which individual behavior became subject to unified goals. Clearly there was a strong political tendency, but this was never party political but followed more general principles, which were framed within the democratic ideals of social justice, by no means unique to Freemasonry".

=== Civil War and Francoist Spain (1936–1975) ===
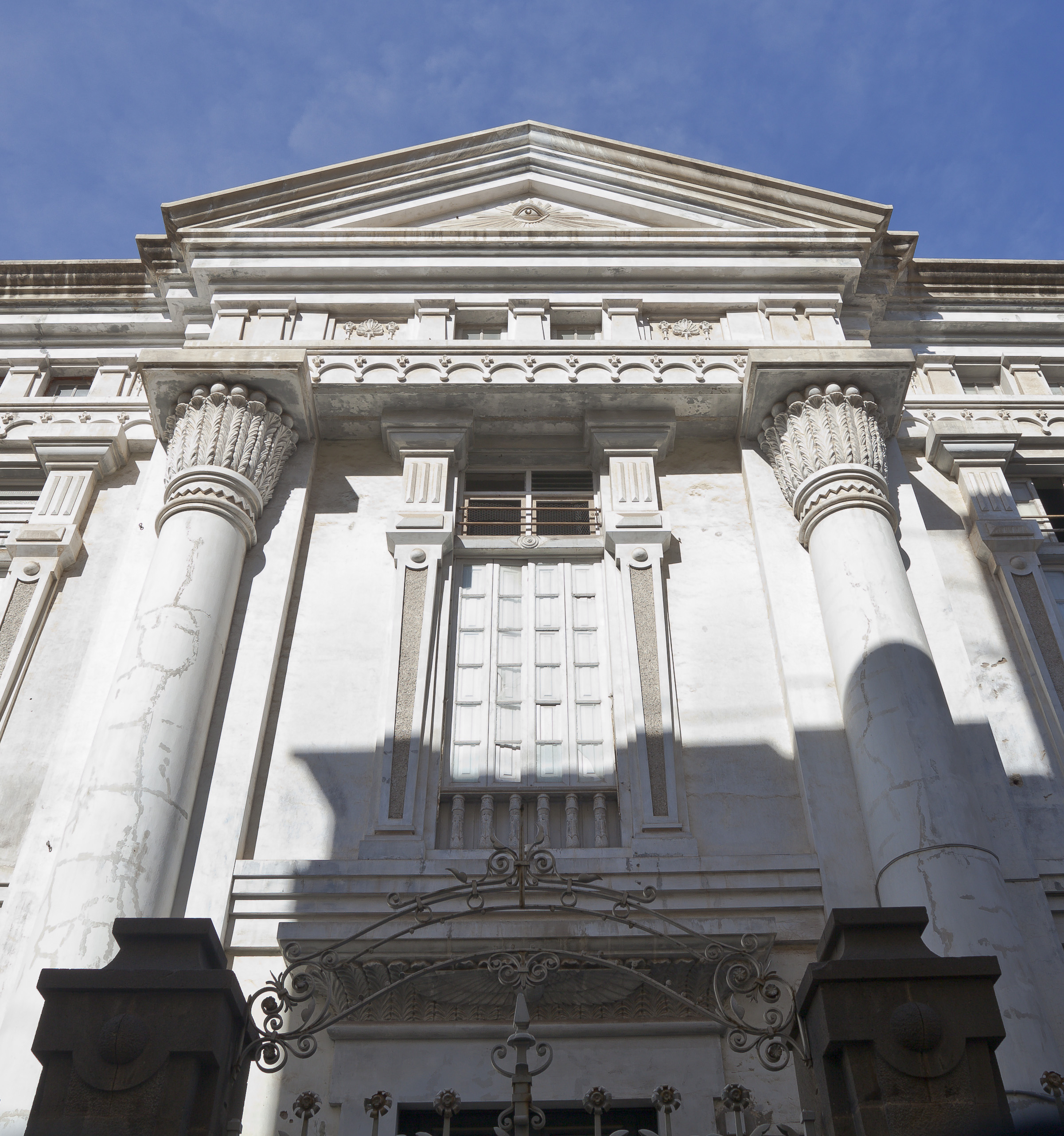
Masonic Temple of Santa Cruz de Tenerife, one of the few Masonic temples that was not demolished in Francoist Spain.

During the Spanish Civil War Freemasons were persecuted in the rebel zone, and after the war all lodges were closed down. In 1940 Franco enacted the Law for the Suppression of Freemasonry and Communism, which became the legal instrument to pursue repression. The Special Tribunal for the Repression of Freemasonry and Communism functioned until 1963, when it was replaced by the Public Order Court, created under the same law.

During the immediate post-Civil War crackdown, an estimated 10,000 Spaniards were shot for simply being Freemasons.

In Francoist Spain Spanish Freemasonry existed only in exile. The grand master of the Grand Orient of Spain was Antonio Villar Masso, who along with other Spanish exiles such as Joan Bertran Deu had been taken in by the Grand Orient of France. In an interview published in European space (espacios europeos) Villar Masso said:

A March 22, 1972, in Paris, I was born to life in a Masonic Lodge of the Spanish Grand Orient in exile. It was called "Union Hispana No1". It was formed by Spanish residents of the French capital, and welcomed into the fraternal hospitality of the Grand Orient of France, in one of whose temples at its headquarters on 16 Rue Cadet, the impressive ceremony was held. With that Great Obedience, as with the Grand Lodge of Mexico and the Spanish-American Lodges in general, all Spanish Freemasons have a debt of honor that should not be forgotten.

Many centers and temples of Masonry were destroyed throughout the country. In 1936, in the first decree against Freemasonry dictated by Franco, the Masonic Temple of Santa Cruz de Tenerife (the largest Masonic center of Spain until that moment) was closed, desecrated and seized by the Spanish Falange. However unlike what happened in the rest of the country this temple was never destroyed.

=== Democratic Transition (1975–1982) ===
Following the adoption of the 1978 Constitution, Freemasonry was legalized in Spain on 19 May 1979 by a decision of Court of Administrative Litigation of the High Court which overturned a decision of the Directorate General of Internal Policies on 7 February that year which had outlawed the Grand Orient of Spain. The stated reason for the annulment was that "the Directorate General of Internal Policy, in outlawing Spanish Regular Craft Masonry, exceeded the limited statutory power that the Constitution gives government authority...which precludes the performance of a trial of real and alleged hidden intentions in promoting their creation". The High Court based its judgment on the freedom of association recognized and protected by the Constitution.

== Contemporary Spanish Freemasonry ==
The current picture of Masonic organizations in Spain is that of a plurality of different interpretations of Masonic regularity, with the result that one may find there many different types of lodges: liberal, conservative, traditional, secular, deistic, esoteric, regional, national, international, as well as male, female and mixed.

In 1979 the Spanish Federation of Le Droit Humain continued the work interrupted in 1938 but continued in exile. Le Droit Humain is the first and oldest mixed Masonic Order and now spans over fifty countries. The Symbolic Grand Lodge of Spain (founded in 1980) also has mixed lodges and is part of the CLIPSAS alliance. The male only Grand Lodge of Spain was founded 1982, and has the recognition of United Grand Lodge of England (as well as most Grand Lodges in the United States) and has the highest number of lodges in contemporary Spain.

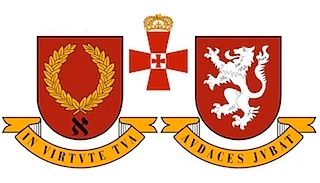
Seal of the Ist and IVth Provinces of the Knights Beneficent of the Holy City, corresponding to the old crowns of Aragon and Castile

There is also the Feminine Grand Orient of Spain and the Feminine Grand Lodge of Spain, with other regional implementations of women's Masonry, such as the Grand Lodge of the Canary Islands, the Grand Lodge of Catalonia and the Grand Orient of Catalonia. In 2003 the Hispanic Grand Priory was founded, an obedience open only to Christians, and practicing the Rectified Scottish Rite.

International Masonic organizations such as the Grand Orient of France have a presence in Spain. There are also Masonic Lodges of other organizations such as the Grand Lodge of France or the Traditional and Symbolic Grand Lodge among others.

Similarly, in 2001, the Grand Orient of Iberia, a liberal obedience which, like the Symbolic Grand Lodge of Spain, welcomes male, female and mixed lodges and works mostly in the French Rite both in the Iberian peninsula and in Mexico and France. In 2010 it had thirteen lodges, with one in Mexico City and two in Paris.

In 2007, the Iberian United Grand Lodge, an obedience which observed traditional regularity but not recognised by the United Grand Lodge of England emerged.

In 2011 the Grand Lodge of Spain (the largest Masonic group in Spain, whose members comprise 3,000 of the 3,600 Masons estimated to live in the country, most of them Spanish, with some British and French) published the first Masonic Barometer, a snapshot of who they are and what they care about as members of this group. According to the abstract published by the daily El País, "the result is that they are believers (32% declare themselves Christian, without pointing specifically to any denomination, another 11.6% Roman Catholic), with strong, but varied political convictions (28% declare themselves liberal, 16.3% social democratic, 15.6% conservative), and consider the biggest problem facing Spain at the moment is "the crisis of values." So apart from Christians and Catholics, there are also, to a much lesser extent (less than 5% each), Protestants, Anglicans, Jews and Buddhists. But undoubtedly the largest category comprises those who declare themselves simply "spiritual without affiliation to any religion" (35%). The Barometer explains that there are no atheist Masons (compared to 8.8% of the general public) citing the essence of Freemasonry, which has its essential foundation in the Faith in a Higher Power

=== Masonic obediences in Spain ===
- The Grand Lodge of Spain (Gran Logia de España) was created on November 6, 1982, in Madrid. Its current headquarters are in Barcelona and it consists of 180 lodges located throughout the country. It is organized into eight Masonic Provinces (Andalusia, Balears, Canary Islands, Castille, Catalonia, Madrid, Murcia and Valencia), each one with its own Provincial Grand Lodge. It is the Regular Masonic jurisdiction for Spain, having the recognition of the United Grand Lodge of England, as well as many of the other regular Grand Lodges around the world.
- The Symbolic Grand Lodge of Spain (Gran Logia Simbólica Española), which accepts both men and women. It was founded in 1980 and currently has 41 lodges located around the country.
- Le Droit Humain - Spanish Federation Is a global Masonic Order which accepts both men and women. It has about 32,000 members in more than 60 countries around the world and on all 5 continents.

== Notes and references ==
=== Bibliography ===
- Gould, Robert Freke (1887). Gould's History of Freemasonry Throughout the World, Volume III. Charles Scribner's Sons.
