= Sugden Audio =

Audio equipment manufacturer

- Company type: Private limited company
- Industry: Audiovisual equipment manufacturing and distribution
- Founded: 1967
- Headquarters: Heckmondwike, West Yorkshire, United Kingdom
- Key people: Jim Sugden; Richard Allan
- Products: High fidelity equipment Audiovisual equipment
- Website: www.sugdenaudio.com

Sugden Audio is a British engineering company that manufactures hi-fi and audio equipment. Founded by James Edward Sugden in Cleckheaton, West Yorkshire in 1967, the company is best known as the manufacturer of the Sugden A21 amplifier.

Sugden had been involved in the manufacture of scientific equipment since 1960 with his company Research Electronics. Sugden was keenly interested in hi-fi, in particular in overcoming the problem of crossover distortion common in Class B solid state amplifier designs at the time. He developed a Class-A amplifier, the Si 402, which avoided this, however it was extremely expensive, costing 100 Guineas (£105, equivalent to £1,700 in 2025) and few if any were sold. At the time, Sugden was the only company in the industry using Class A design in their Hi-Fi amplifiers.

The following year Sugden agreed to work with local loudspeaker manufacture Richard Allan, which would market Sugden's amplifiers under their brand name. In April 1968 the A21 amplifier was premiered at an audio fair in London. It would sell for a much more attractive £52 and received good reviews in the audio press.

Shortly after they set up a factory at Carr Street in Cleckheaton in West Yorkshire and started producing the A21 amplifier under their name. They subsequently expanded their range of products to include other amplifiers and tuners.

In 1981, they relocated to Valley Road in Heckmondwike where they remain.
