= Masonic Temple of Santa Cruz de Tenerife =

Cultural property in Spain

Coordinates: 28°28′08″N 16°15′10″W

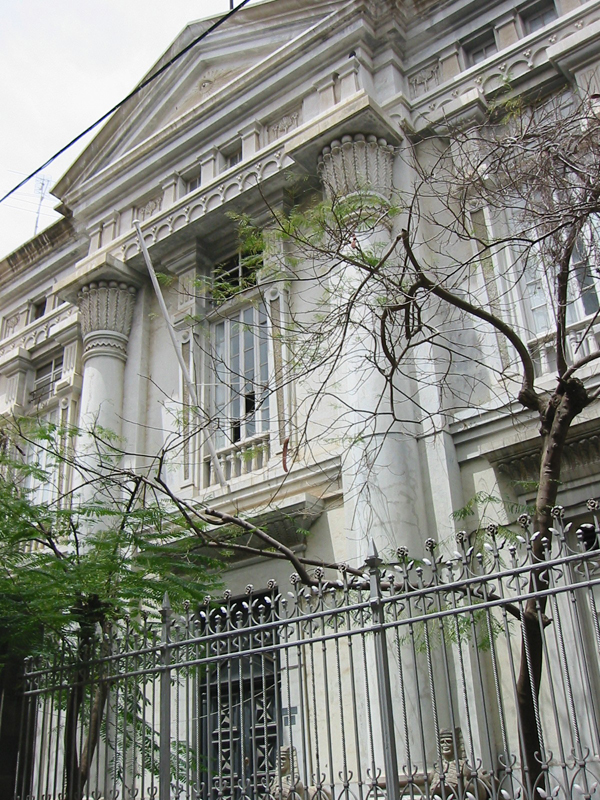

Religion
- Affiliation: Freemasonry
- Rite: Grande Oriente Ibérico (1895–1902); Grande Oriente Español (1903–1922); Gran Logia de Canarias (1923–1931); Gran Oriente Español (1931–1936)
- Ecclesiastical or organisational status: Temple
- Year consecrated: 1902

Location
- Location: Calle San Lucas, Santa Cruz de Tenerife, Spain
- Country: Spain
- Interactive map of Masonic Temple of Santa Cruz de Tenerife

Architecture
- Architect: Manuel de Cámara
- Type: Masonic Temple
- Style: Egyptian Revival
- Founder: Añaza Lodge
- Completed: 1923; 103 years ago

Website
- templomasonicotenerife.es

The Historic Masonic Temple of Santa Cruz de Tenerife is a Masonic Temple located in the city of Santa Cruz de Tenerife (Canary Islands, Spain), on Calle San Lucas. The building was constructed for use by the Añaza Lodge between 1899 and 1902. It is considered one of the main Masonic temples in Spain, and the first in the Canary Islands.

It is considered the finest example of Masonic Temple in Spain and was the greatest Masonic Temple in Spain before Franco's military occupied the site.

== History of the Añaza Lodge ==
The Añaza Lodge, the Canary Islands' most important 20th century Masonic lodge, was founded on August 8, 1895. It consolidated rapidly, causing Canary Island Masonry to reorganize in the first part of the century.

The Lodge was originally under the auspices of a second-order Spanish obedience, the Grande Oriente Ibérico, to which it remained united until 1902. The Grande Oriente Ibérico had emerged in 1892 from a group of lodges coming, mostly, from the Grande Oriente Nacional de España of the Viscount of Ros who, for various reasons, decided not to group around the Grande Oriente Español de Morayta.

In 1903, due to doubts about the true importance of the Grande Oriente Ibérico, they decided to change their auspices, becoming part of the renewed Grande Oriente Español with the number 270. The Añaza 270 Lodge lasted under this obedience until 1922. Between 1923 and 1931, during the Dictatorship of Primo de Rivera, the Añaza Lodge became part, with number 1, of the newly created Gran Logia de Canarias. In 1931, after a divergence of opinions, it was divided into two: the Añaza lodge No. 270, once again attached to the Gran Oriente Español, and the Añaza Lodge No. 1, with a smaller number of members who were expelled from the temple despite their claims. Añaza 270 remained in the Masonic Temple of Santa Cruz de Tenerife on San Lucas Street and in the Gran Oriente Español until the military uprising of 1936, when it was dissolved and its assets confiscated by the rebels.

== The building ==
The building contains strong symbolism, mostly inspired by the architectural tradition of ancient Egypt.

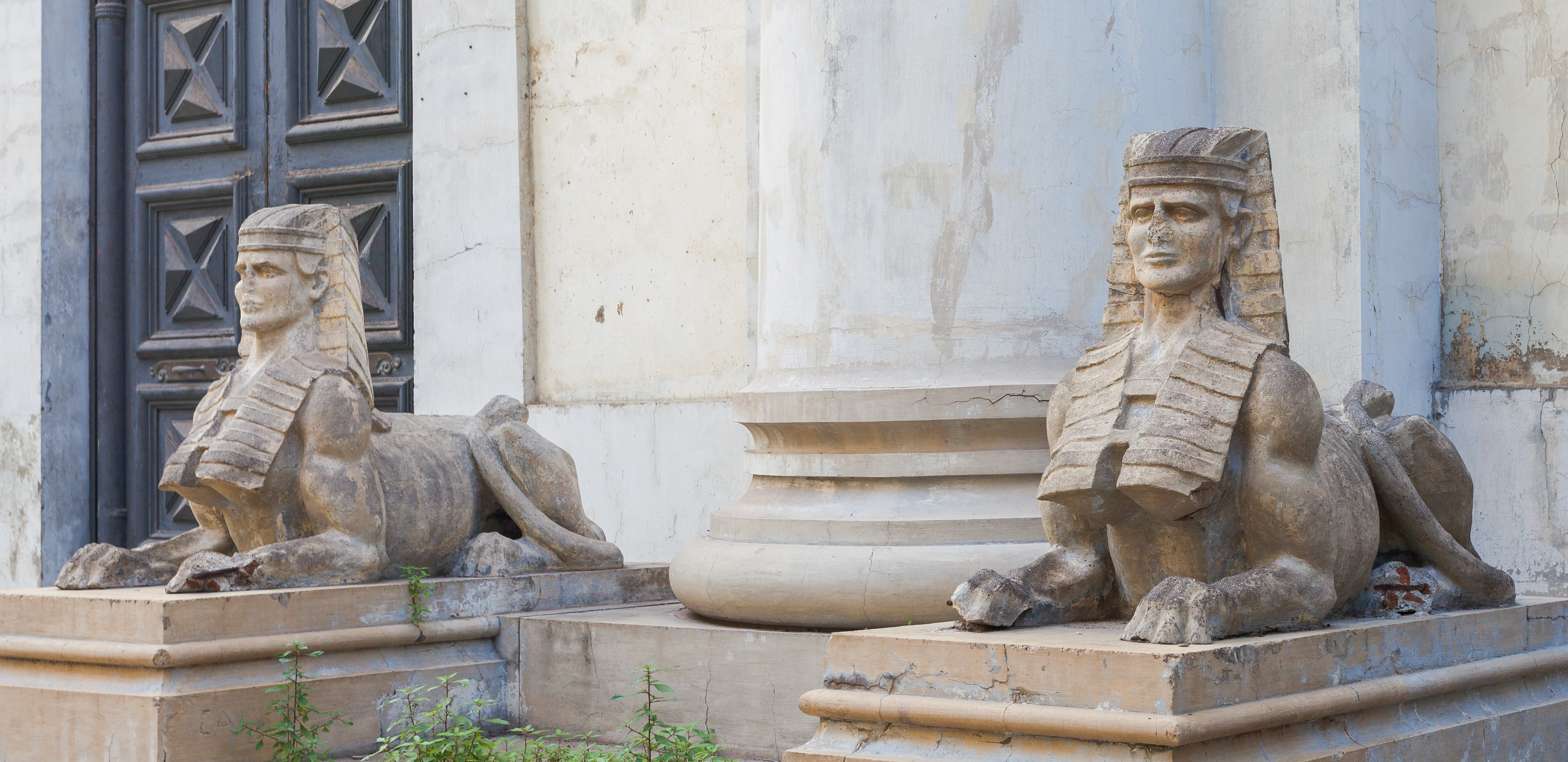
Sphinx statues in the entrance of the Masonic Temple

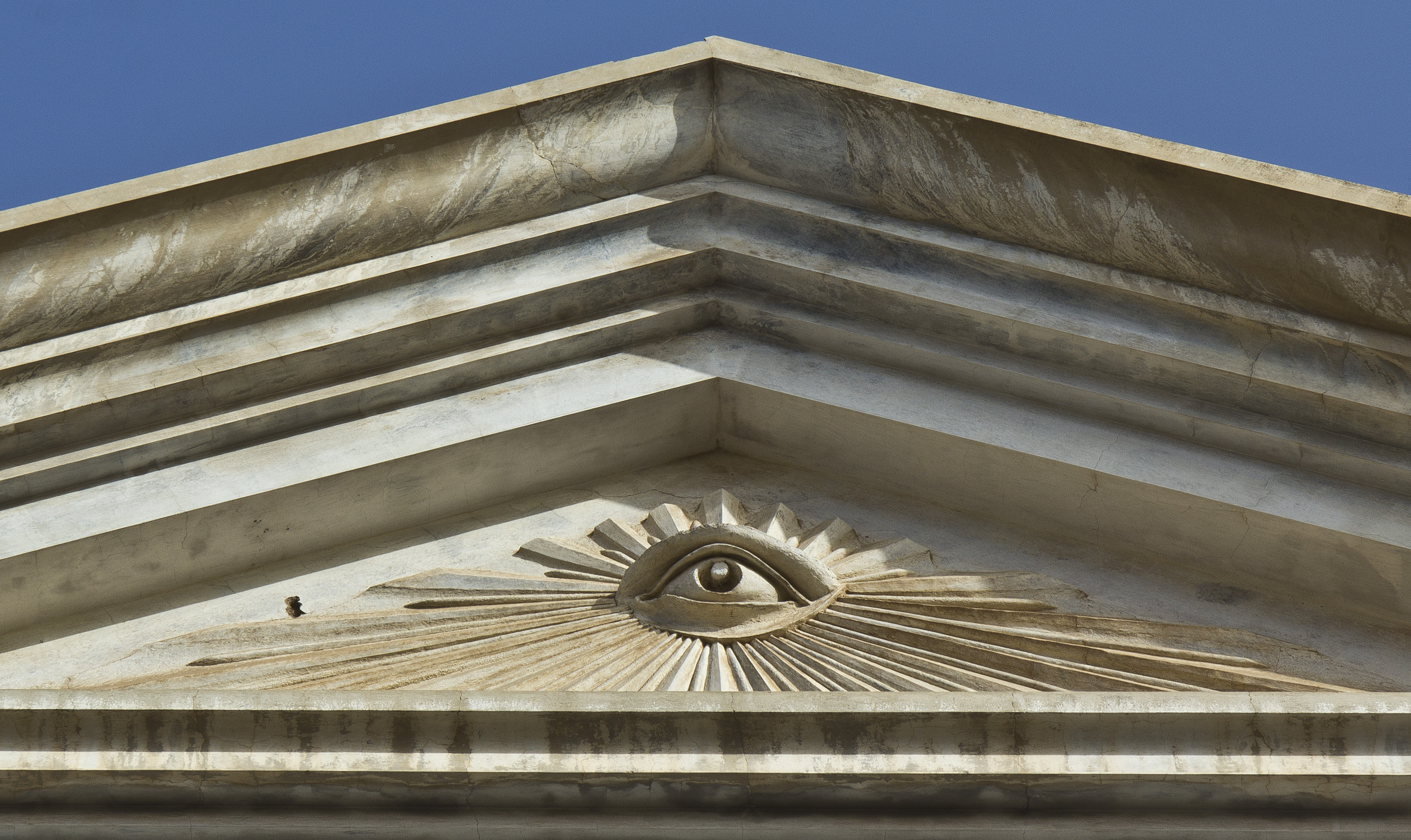
Eye of Providence, on the facade of the Masonic Temple

The façade is divided into three sections, the central has two huge columns with a plain shaft and palm-leaf capitals, supporting a bulky triangular pediment. In this eye there is a radiant ray, representing the Supreme Being, Great Architect of the Universe according to Masonic symbolism. Flanking each column are two sphinxes (four in total) lying on their stomachs and covered with a nemes. They were carved by the sculptor Guzmán Compañ Zamorano (1878–1944). The main door is wood and carved with geometric patterns. The lintel is decorated with palm leaves and a sun with wings of an eagle, symbol of the deity Horus. The building stands on an stereobate.

The Masonic Temple of Santa Cruz de Tenerife is located at the same latitude (28º north) of the Saint Catherine's Monastery of Mount Sinai (Egypt). This monastery was built in the place where according to the Old Testament, Moses received the Tables of the Law.

In the words of José Manuel Ledesma Alonso, official chronicler of the city of Santa Cruz de Tenerife: "Due to its grandeur, beauty, and perfection, it is considered to be on a par with those in London and Washington".

== Looting ==
On September 15, 1936, in the first decree against Freemasonry issued by General Francisco Franco, this property was requisitioned and transferred to the Spanish Falange, which charged visitors who wanted to visit the Hall of Reflections. Shortly after, it would become the warehouse of the Military Pharmacy, an activity that was later combined with an optician for the Army, while at the top it was converted into a barracks for soldiers until it was closed in 1990. The archives of the lodge were taken to the Delegation of Special Services of Salamanca, current "Civil War" Section of the National Historical Archive, where they continue.

Finally, in times of democracy, the State sold the building to the Santa Cruz de Tenerife City Council in 2001 for more than 470,000 euros. The building it was listed as a Site of cultural interest by the Government of the Canary Islands in 2007.

== Restoration ==
After years of numerous vicissitudes, in November 2021 the mayor of the city, José Manuel Bermúdez, presented the project to remodel the property, together with the author of the project, María Nieves Febles. In September 2022, the works began, which, with a budget of more than 3 million euros, have an execution period of approximately two years, although it was extended for another year.

In 2023 it was announced that the building would be declared Monument to Historical Memory by the Government of the Canary Islands, that is, as a memorial to the victims persecuted by Franco's regime, Masons or not. Ultimately, it would be declared as such in the Resolution of October 22, 2026, issued by the State Secretariat for Democratic Memory.

On October 27, 2025, it officially reopened after completion of its restoration, although its conversion into a museum and interpretation center for Freemasonry is still pending.

== Scottish Rite Masonic Congress 2016 ==
In November 2016 the Masonic international congress Convent of the Order, was held in Santa Cruz de Tenerife. This is an event held annually in different parts of the world and was organized by the Supreme Council of the 33rd Degree of the Ancient and Accepted Scottish Rite for Spain. This conference helped raise funds for the rehabilitation of the Masonic Temple of Santa Cruz de Tenerife.

The Congress was attended by over 300 members representing 17 of the 57 regular Supreme Councils in the world, emphasising the importance of the event for the Ancient and Accepted Scottish Rite part of the global Masonic community. During the meeting in the Masonic Temple the act to create the Confederación Iberoamericana de Supremos Consejos (Latin American Confederation of Supreme Councils) was signed.

== See also ==
- Fonseca House
