= Malcolm MacFarlane =

- Born: 30 November 1853; Dalavich, Loch Awe, Scotland
- Died: 22 February 1931 (aged 77); Greenock, Scotland
- Occupations: Architect and Land Surveyor

Malcolm MacFarlane (Calum MacPhàrlain, 1853–1931) was a Scottish Gaelic scholar and songwriter. He was a Secretary and President of Gaelic Society of Glasgow and an active member of An Comunn Gàidhealach.

== Life ==
He was born at Kilmun Farm, Dalavich, Loch Awe on 30 November 1853. His father was John MacFarlane, a labourer, and his mother Sarah MacIntyre. He was brought up at Inkerman near Paisley, Renfrewshire and was educated there. He was a 'measurer' by profession — the early name for a quantity surveyor. He was also a member of the Inverness Gaelic Society, the Irish Texts Society, and the Folk Song Society. He was the author of works such as The Phonetics of Gaelic and Songs of the Highlands, Inverness: Logan & Co., 1902. He died unmarried in Greenock on 22 February 1931.

== Publications ==
=== Books ===
- The Phonetics of the Gaelic Language. With an exposition of the current orthography and a system of phonography. Paisley: J. and R. Parlane, [1889].
- Orain agus dain - Fo chùram. A. Guinne agus C. Mhic-Phàrlain. (Songs and Poems by Rob Donn Mackay. Containing unpublished melodies collected in the Reay country; sketch of the bard and his times - glossary. Edited by Rev. A. Gunn and M. MacFarlane. Illustrated.). Glasgow: Iain Mac-Aoidh: J. Mackay, 1899.
- Songs of the Highlands. Inverness: Logan and Co., [1902]. Musical accompaniments were supplied by Frederick Wilson Whitehead. These songs include The Thistle o' Scotland, the words of which were translated by MacFarlane from the Gaelic of Evan MacColl.
- Bardic Melody: a book in which the poems, songs and ditties of the Scottish Gaels are exhibited along with their airs. Stirling: Eneas Mackay, 1908, etc.
- The School Gaelic Dictionary. Prepared for the use of learners of the Gaelic language. Stirling: Eneas Mackay, 1912.
- Uirsgeulan Gaidhealach: leis an do choisneadh duaisean aig Mòid A' Chomuinn Ghaidhealaich. Edition: An dara clobhualadh / fo làimh Chaluim Mhic Phàrlain. Struibhle: Aonghas Mac Aoidh, 1912. [Four Scots Gaelic stories that apparently won prizes at the Mod of An Comunn Gàidhealach.]
- An Comh-threòraiche. Stirling: Eneas Mackay, 1913.
- Am Mosgladh Mòr. Glascho [Glasgow]: An Comunn Gàidhealach, 1925?. Pdf available from NLS.

=== Scores ===
- Binneas nam Bàrd, etc. (Bardic Melody. A Book in which the Poems, Songs and Ditties of the Scottish Gaels are exhibited along with their Airs, etc. [Staff and tonic sol-fa notation. Stirling: E. Mackay, 1908, etc.,
- A Lament for Nurse Cavell. [Song.] Words by M. Maclean. Melody and Gaelic words by M. Macfarlane. Edited and arranged by A. W. Marchant. Stirling: E. Mackay, [1917].

=== Archives ===
- Printed material from the papers of Malcolm MacFarlane. Some pamphlets in Gaelic. Includes book prospectuses, catalogues of music, concert programmes, publications of various Scottish clan societies and miscellaneous publications to do with Scotland and the Scottish way of life. National Library of Scotland, shelfmark HP4.89.319.
