= Grande Oriente Ibérico =

The Grande Oriente Ibérico is a Grand Orient of Freemasonry covering Spain and Portugal that was founded in 2001. Since 2012 it is a member of CLIPSAS.
