= Branch FM =

- Dewsbury, West Yorkshire; England
- Frequency: 101.8 MHz

Programming
- Language: English
- Format: Christian

History
- First air date: May 2007

Links
- Webcast: Web stream
- Website: www.branchfm.com

Branch FM is a community radio station based in Dewsbury, West Yorkshire, England, which has operated since May 2007. It broadcasts on the 101.8 FM frequency, in the West Yorkshire, area on an OFCOM licence until 2017. It was one of the first Christian radio stations to be given a broadcast licence in the UK.

The station's OFCOM licence commits it to:

- Typical output of 75% music, 25% speech
- Predominantly Christian Contemporary Music
- Speech output to include news, weather, travel, Ministry teaching, drama, interviews, lifestyle features and studio discussion
- Broadcast in English
- Live output for at least 7 hours a day
- Majority locally produced

The station is also expected to provide training, encourage volunteering and deliver other social gains to the local community.

Whilst the audience of the station is assumed to be mostly Christian, the management of the station have been quoted as saying that they feel it should be seeking to "wholeheartedly support" non-Christians doing good things in the community.

The radio station output is volunteer led and features interviews with prominent local church leaders.

According to the station's 2014 return to the Charity Commission, the UK regulator of charities, Branch FM had a turnover of about £13,000.
