= George Arthur Pollard =

New Zealand salvation army officer and administrator

George Arthur Pollard (1863–1939) was a New Zealand salvation army officer and administrator. He was born in Heckmondwike, Yorkshire, England in 1863.
