= Masonic Temple =

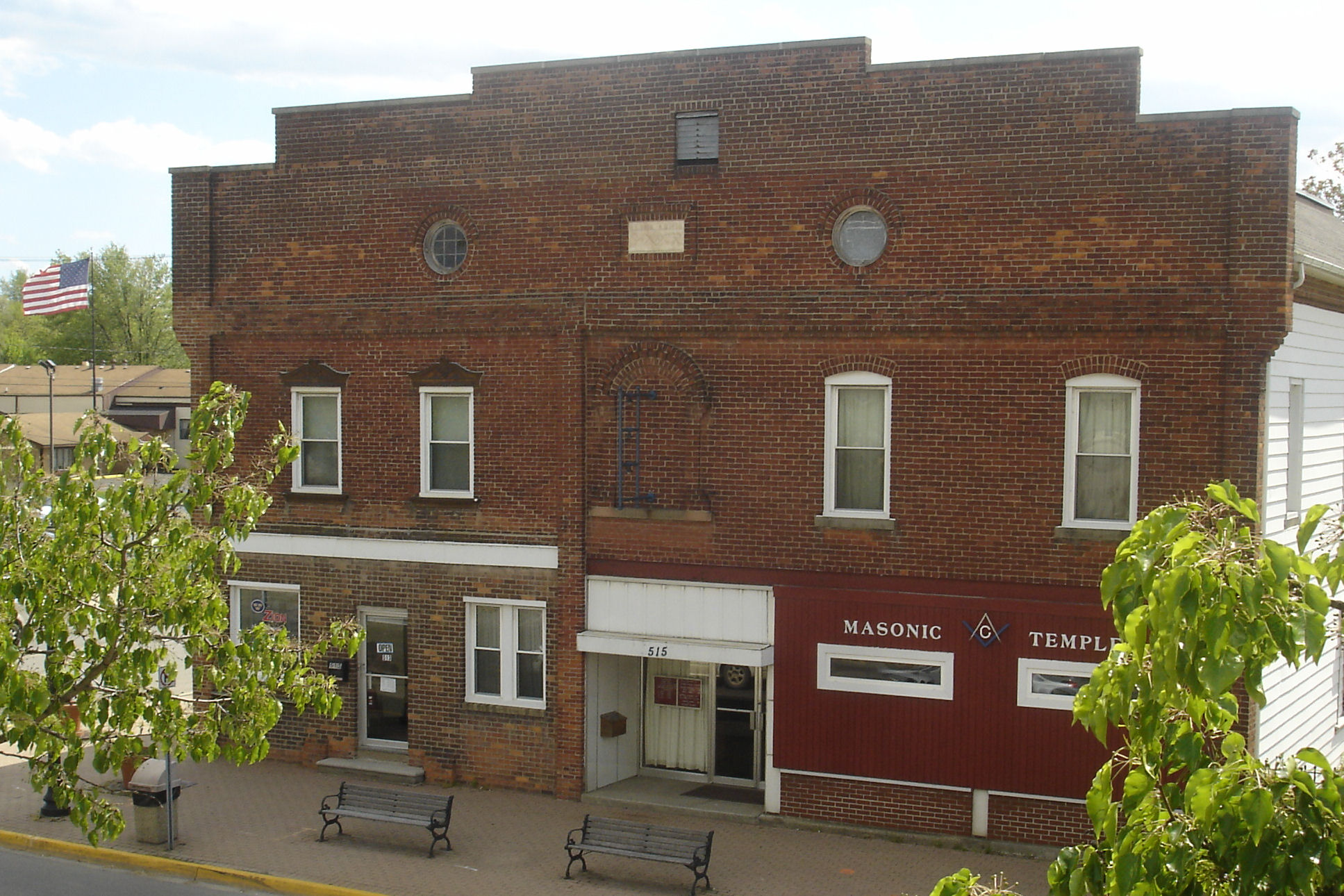
The Belleville Masonic Temple, Belleville, Michigan. An example of a smaller Masonic Temple

A Masonic Temple or Masonic Hall is, within Freemasonry, the room or edifice where a Masonic Lodge meets. Masonic Temple may also refer to an abstract spiritual goal and the conceptual ritualistic space of a meeting.

== Development and history ==
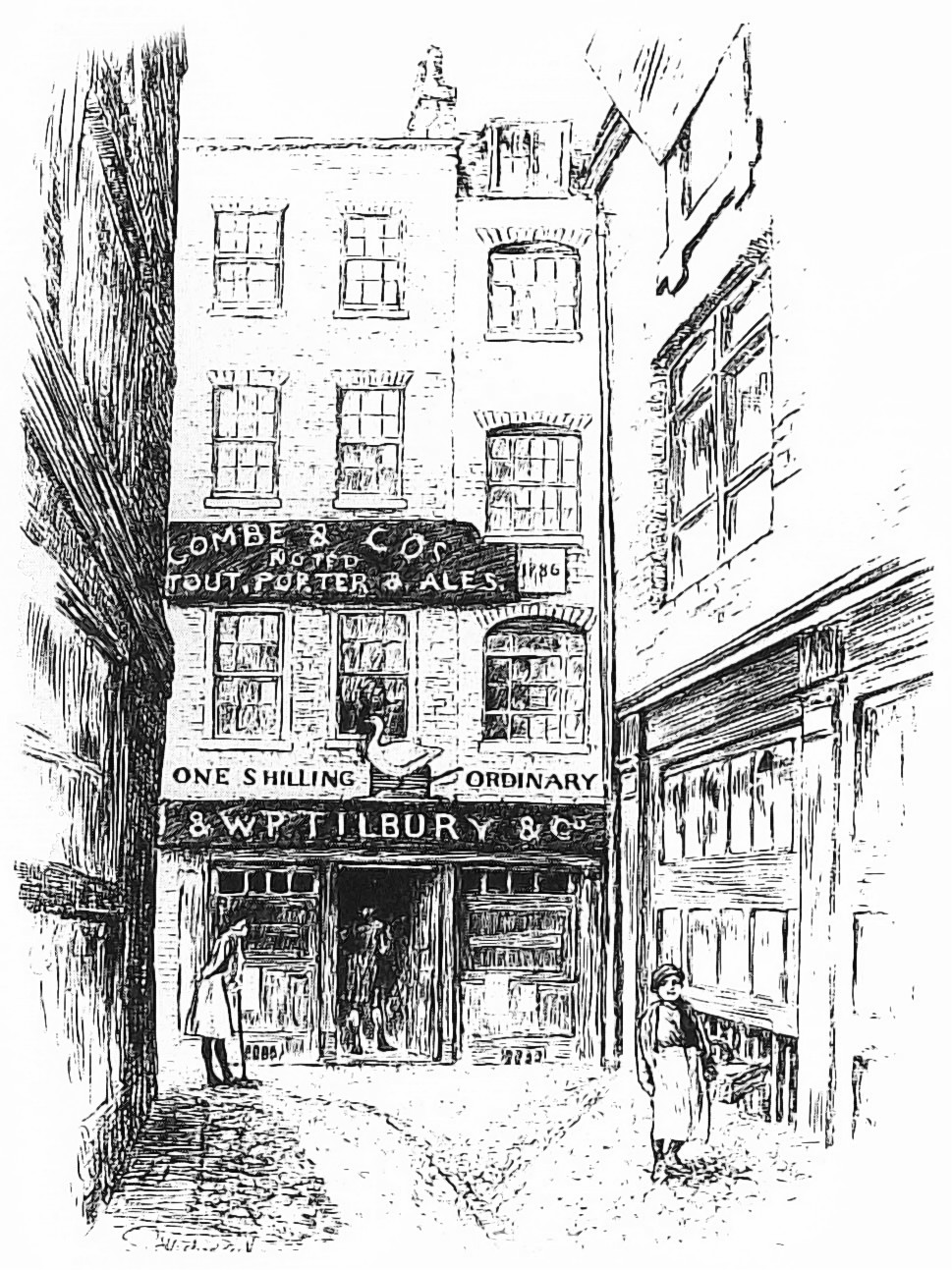
Goose and Gridiron tavern, where the United Grand Lodge of England was founded in 1717

In the early years of Freemasonry, from the 17th through the 18th centuries, it was most common for Masonic Lodges to form their Masonic Temples either in private homes or in the private rooms of public taverns or halls which could be regularly rented out for Masonic purposes. This was less than ideal, however; meeting in public spaces required the transportation, set-up and dismantling of increasingly elaborate paraphernalia every time the lodge met. Lodges began to look for permanent facilities, dedicated purely to Masonic use.

== First Temples ==
The first Masonic Hall was built in 1765 in Marseille, France. A decade later in May, 1775, the cornerstone of what would come to be known as Freemasons' Hall, London, was laid in solemn ceremonial form spurring a trend that would continue to present day. Most lodges, however, could not afford to build their own facilities and instead rented rooms above commercial establishments (hotels, banks and opera houses were the most common landlords). With permanent facilities, the term "Masonic Temple" began to be applied not just to the symbolic formation of the Temple, but also to the physical place in which this took place. It began to be applied to the lodge rooms themselves. (A similar transfer took place with the term Masonic Lodge, which in ritual terms refers to the people assembled and not to the place of assemblage. In common usage, however, it began to be applied to the place as well as the people.)

In the latter half of the nineteenth century, as the popularity of Freemasonry grew, more and more lodges began to have the financial wherewithal to own their own premises. In many locations this was spurred by changing tax laws that allowed fraternal and benevolent societies to own property and lease space without being taxed as commercial landlords. In larger towns and cities, where there were many lodges, it became economical for groups of lodges to band together and either purchase or build their own buildings with both commercial space and lodge rooms in the same building, the rents from the former funding upkeep of the latter. This was especially true in cities where the Grand Lodge met. These buildings, too, began to be referred to as "Masonic Temples", "Masonic Halls", or "Masonic Lodges".

In smaller towns the trend was different. Here, instead of building large impressive buildings in the hopes of attracting multiple commercial tenants, the local lodges tended to build more modest structures, with space for a single tenant, a small meeting hall for public rental, or no rental space at all. In addition, especially in the United States, lodges founded in established communities would purchase buildings that had historic value as lodge members wanted their new lodge to be associated with the history of their local community like their older counterparts. Thus they looked to purchase old churches, schools and the homes of community founders, which they would convert into lodge meeting space. These too began to be known as "Masonic Temples".

== Heyday and decline ==
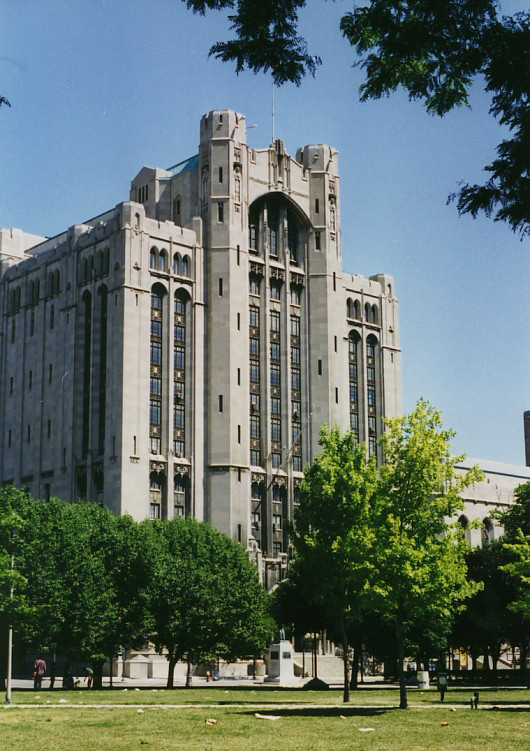
The Detroit Masonic Temple, Detroit, Michigan. The world's largest Masonic Temple.

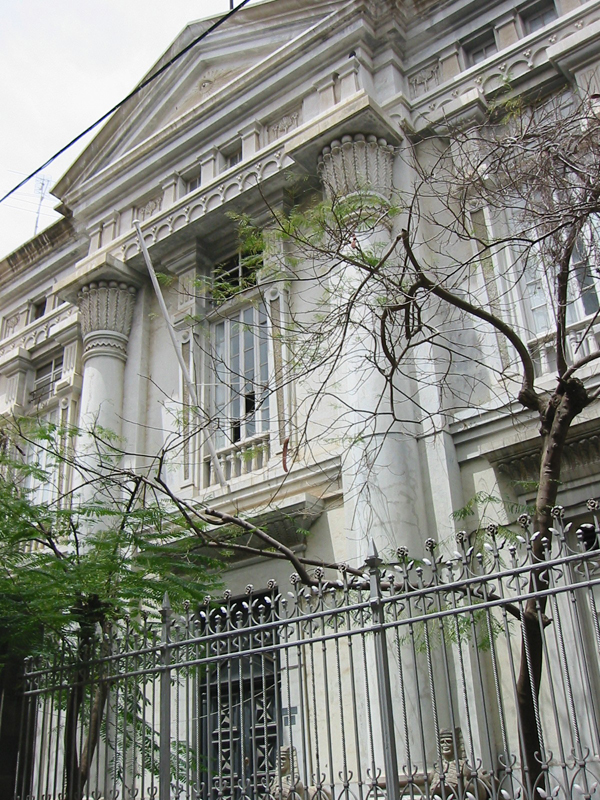
Masonic Temple of Santa Cruz de Tenerife (Spain).

The 1920s marked a heyday for Freemasonry, especially in the United States. By 1930, over 12% of the adult male population of the United States were members of the fraternity. The dues generated by such numbers allowed state Grand Lodges to build on truly monumental scales. Typical of the era are the Dayton Masonic Center and Detroit Masonic Temple (the largest Masonic Temple in the world).

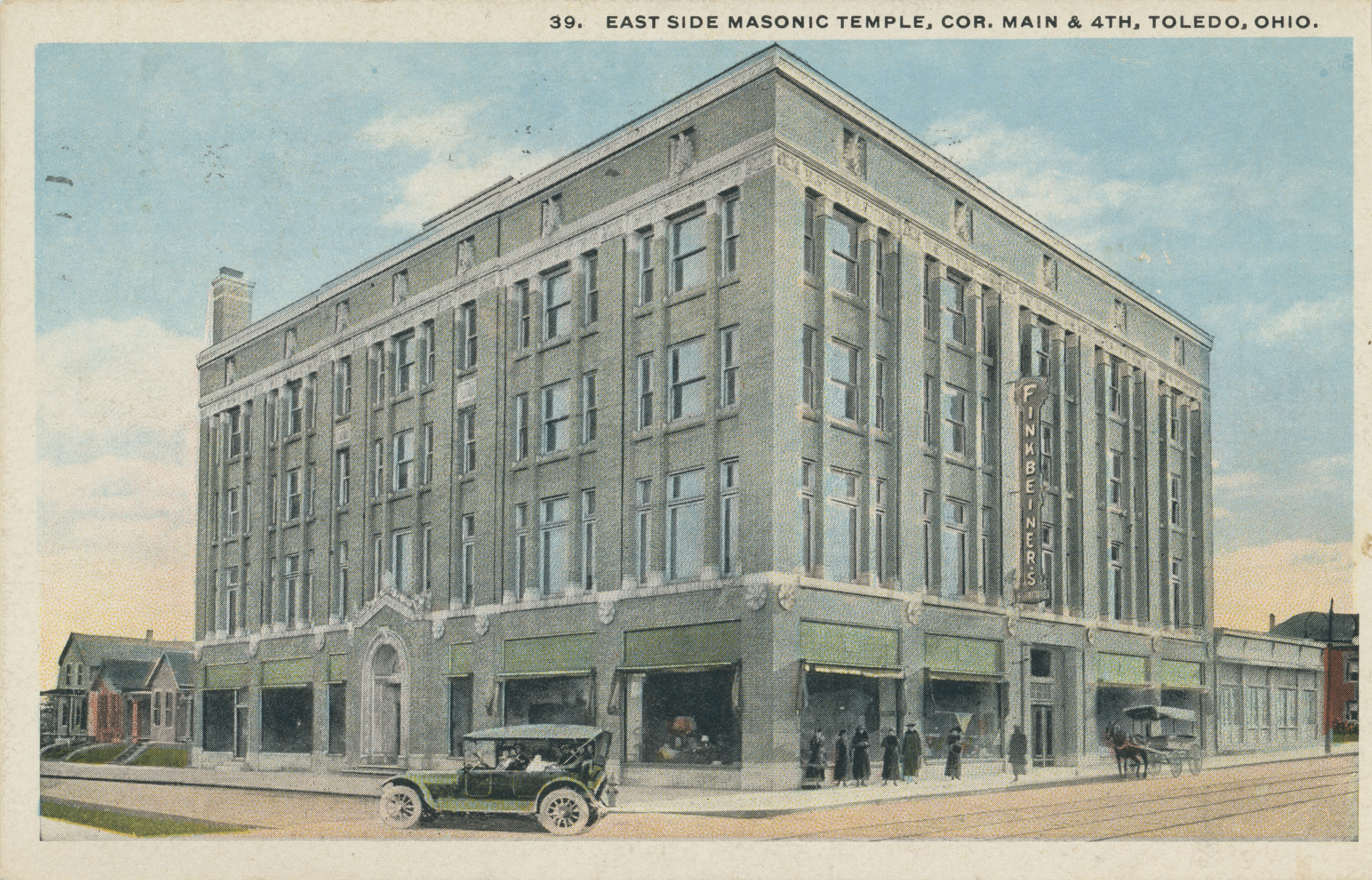
Postcard of the Masonic Temple located on Toledo's east side in 1920. Still standing but now vacant.

The Great Depression hit Freemasonry as hard as it hit the rest of the world, and both local Lodges and Grand Lodges turned away from erecting buildings and towards helping those in need. World War II saw resources focused on supporting the War effort. While there was something of a resurgence in the 1950s, the anti-establishment attitudes of the 1960s and 1970s affected membership numbers even further. Lodges began to close and merge, with those that could no longer afford to maintain their buildings selling these to developers. Many Masonic Temples and Halls were converted to non-masonic uses including completely commercial spaces, hotels, night clubs, and even condominiums. Many lodges have returned to renting rooms, and there is a small movement calling for Freemasonry to return to its roots and open their Masonic Lodges in taverns, as remains the case in England where public houses, private clubs and hotels may contain dedicated Lodge facilities, typically but not always in the basement.

== Naming conventions ==
When Freemasons first began building dedicated structures the more frequently used term for a Masonic Temple was Masonic Hall. This began to change in the mid 19th century when the larger Masonic Halls most often found in major cities began to be named with the term Masonic Temple. As time went on more and more American buildings began using the name Masonic Temple regardless of their size or location. In US Freemasonry today the term Masonic Hall is experiencing a revival motivated in part by the public misconception that Masons conduct a form of religious worship in their Temples.

== Usage ==
Though Masonic Temples in their most basic definition serve as a home to one or more Masonic Lodges and bodies, they can also serve many other purposes as well. Smaller Masonic Temples will often consist of nothing more than a meeting room with a kitchen/dining area attached. Larger Masonic Temples can contain multiple meeting rooms, concert halls, libraries, and museums as well as non-masonic commercial and office space.

== Design ==
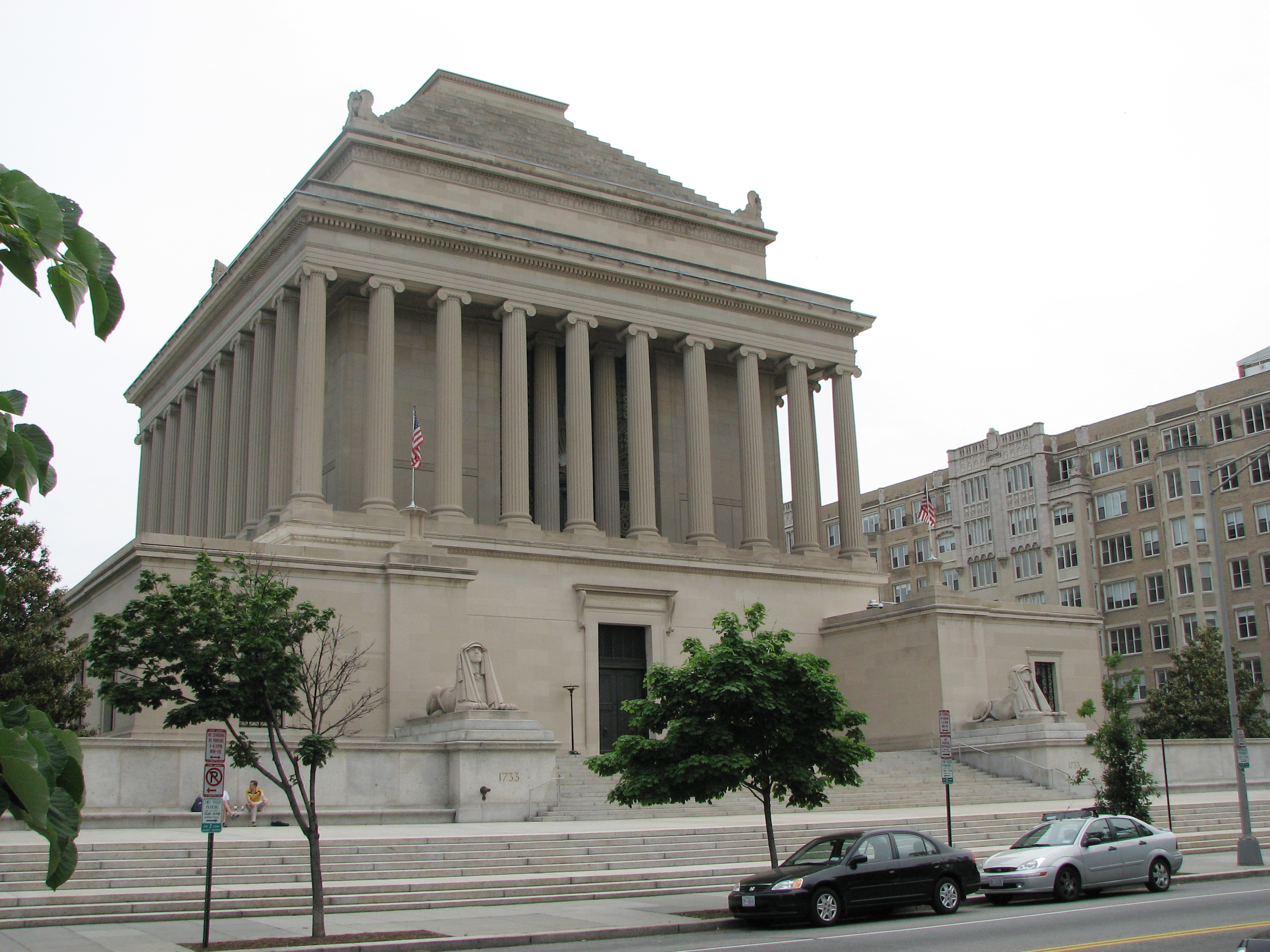
The Masonic House of the Temple of the Scottish Rite, Washington, DC, John Russell Pope, architect, 1911–15

Since their inception, the proper design of a Masonic Temple has been a serious subject debate among Masonic scholars and a number of different standards have been proposed. Despite some attempts at standardization, Masonic Temples often vary widely in design. The layout of the lodge room will differ from jurisdiction to jurisdiction and to meet the needs of multiple users.

== See also ==
- List of Masonic buildings
