= Frederick Wilson Whitehead =

English musician

- Born: 1 January 1863; Heckmondwike, West Yorkshire, England
- Died: 6 March 1926 (aged 63); Glasgow, Scotland
- Occupations: Musician, composer, organist, teacher
- Spouse: Kate Emily Howard

Frederick Wilson Whitehead (1 January 1863 – 6 March 1926) was an English organist, composer and teacher of music who settled in Scotland. He was born in Heckmondwike, West Yorkshire. His father was Joseph Whitehead, a master shoemaker employing one man, and his mother was Martha. He married Kate Emily Howard at Headington, Oxfordshire in 1894.

== Career ==
Whitehead's career as a teacher of music had begun by the age of eighteen when his profession is recorded in the 1881 census as being 'teacher of music'. At that time, he was living in Cleckheaton with his parents. While living at Cleckheaton he was the organist of three churches there: St. Luke's, SS. Philip and James, and the Whitechapel Church. By 1891, he was living as a lodger in Elgin, Scotland and was an organist and teacher of music. He was the organist at Elgin Parish Church. By 1901, he was in Inverness and was organist at the High Church, Inverness. By 1911, he was in Govan, Glasgow. While he lived in Glasgow he was organist at the Dowanhill Church. He was an Associate of the Royal College of Music and gained an ARCM in Singing Performing in 1909. He was also an Associate of the Royal College of Organists (A.R.C.O.) He died in Glasgow on 7 March 1926.

== Musical compositions ==
- Ida. A dream of Storybookland. Written by George Temple, composed by Frederick W. Whitehead. Published in England, 1888.
- "Michael the Cavalier". Song, written by G. Temple, composed by Frederick Wilson Whitehead. Edinburgh, etc.: Paterson & Sons, [1897].
- Songs of the Highlands. The Gaelic and English words arranged by M. MacFarlane. The Symphonies and Accompaniments by F. W. Whitehead. Inverness: Logan & Co, [1901]. These songs include "The Thistle o' Scotland" for which Whitehead supplied the arrangement.
- "My Heart's in the Highlands". Song, the words by R. Burns. Gaelic translation by J. Whyte, etc. Arranged by Frederick Wilson Whitehead. London: Novello and Co, [1907].
- Fuinn nan Salm. Gaelic Psalm Tunes, including the long tunes noted by Mr. Whitehead, from Rev. Donald Munro, etc. [Tonic sol-fa notation.] Glasgow: Alex. Maclaren & Sons, [1932?]
