= The Thistle o' Scotland =

Song
- Published: 1902
- Genre: Patriotic song
- Songwriter(s): Malcolm MacFarlane and Evan MacColl
- Composer(s): Frederick Wilson Whitehead

"The Thistle o’ Scotland" (Scottish Gaelic: An Cluaran o h-Alba) was originally called "The Badge of Scotland" (Bràiste h-Alba) but it is more commonly known as "The Thistle o' Scotland".

Malcolm MacFarlane (1853-1931) translated this song from the Scottish Gaelic of Evan MacColl (1808-1898). It was first published in Macfarlane's book, Songs of the Highlands, Inverness: Logan & Company, 1902, pp. 44–45. The accompaniment was by Frederick Wilson Whitehead (1863-1926). It is considered by some to be a possible national anthem for Scotland. A spirited rendition of this song by Ina Miller can be found here.

== Lyrics ==
(As translated by Malcolm MacFarlane)

Chorus
O, the Thistle o’ Scotland was famous of auld,
Wi’ its toorie sae snod and its bristles sae bauld;
’Tis the badge o’ my country – it's aye dear to me;
And the thocht o’ them baith brings the licht to my e’e.

Suaicheantas na h-Alba
(The original Gaelic version by Evan MacColl)

Seisd
’S e Fòghnan na h-Alba lus ainmeil nam buadh;
Lus grinn nan dos calgach thug dearbh air bhi cruaidh;
Sean-suaicheantas mòrail tir bhòidhich mo luaidh:
’S tric dh’fhadaich a dheagh-chliù tein’-éibhinn’nam ghruaidh.

Its strength and its beauty the storm never harms;
It stan's on its guard like a warrior in arms;
Yet its down is saft as the gull's on the sea,
And its tassle as bricht as my Jeanie's blue e’e.
O, The Thistle, etc.

Lus deas nam meur cròcach nach leònar le stoirm;
Ged ’s ionann teachd geàrr air ’s laoch dàna fo airm,
’S leis clòimh tha cho maoth-gheal ri faoileig na tràigh,
’S bàrr-ghucan cho ciùin-ghorm ri sùilean mo ghràidh.
‘S e Fòghnan, etc.

O, my country, what wonder yer fame’s gane afar;
For yer sons ha’e been great baith in peace and in war:
While the sang and the tale live they’ll aye win respect,
The lads neath the bonnets wi’ thistles bedeckt.
O, The Thistle, etc.

Mo dhùthaich, cha ’n ioghnadh mòr chliù air thigh’nn uait,
’S a liuthad duaidh-làraich ’s deagh ghnàth tha ris fuaight’;
An cian is le Albainn luchd seanachais no bard,
Bidh meas air an dealbh anns gach gorm-bhonaid àird.
‘S e Fòghnan, etc.

Langsyne the invaders cam owre to our shore,
And fiercely our thistle they scotched and they tore;
When they maist thocht it deid, ‘twas then it up bore,
And it bloomed on their graves quite as strong as before.
O, The Thistle, etc.

Sluagh borb, le droch rùn da, ’s tric bhrùchd air a nuas;
’S tric bhrùchd, ach, gun taing dhoibh, a cheann chum e suas;
’Nuair shaoil iad bhi buadhach, ’s ann fhuair iad fath bròin:
Feuch! a’ cinn thar an uaighean an cluaran gun leòn.
‘S e Fòghnan, etc.

My blessings be yours! Is there Scotsman ava
Wad stan’ by and see ony harm on ye fa’?
Is there gentle or semple wha lives in our land
Wad refuse to drink health to the thistle so grand?
O, The Thistle, etc.

Mo bheannachd gu bràth air! có ’n Gaidheal no ’n Gall
Nach seasadh gu bàs e, g’a theàrnadh o chall!
Co ìosal no uasal, bheir cluas do mo dhàn,
Nach òladh leam “buaidh leis” o chuachana làn!
‘S e Fòghnan, etc.

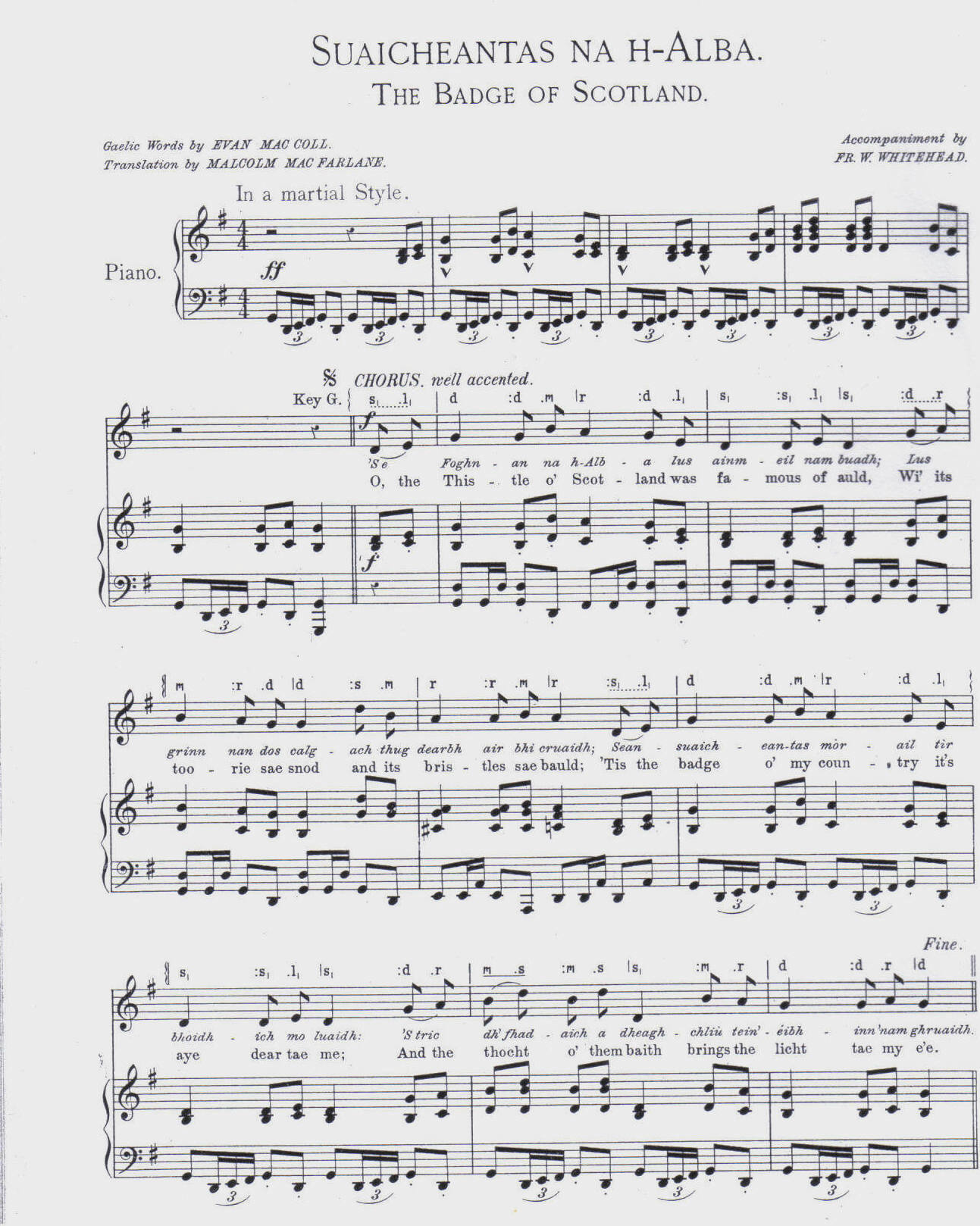
First page of the song in Songs of the Highlands p.44

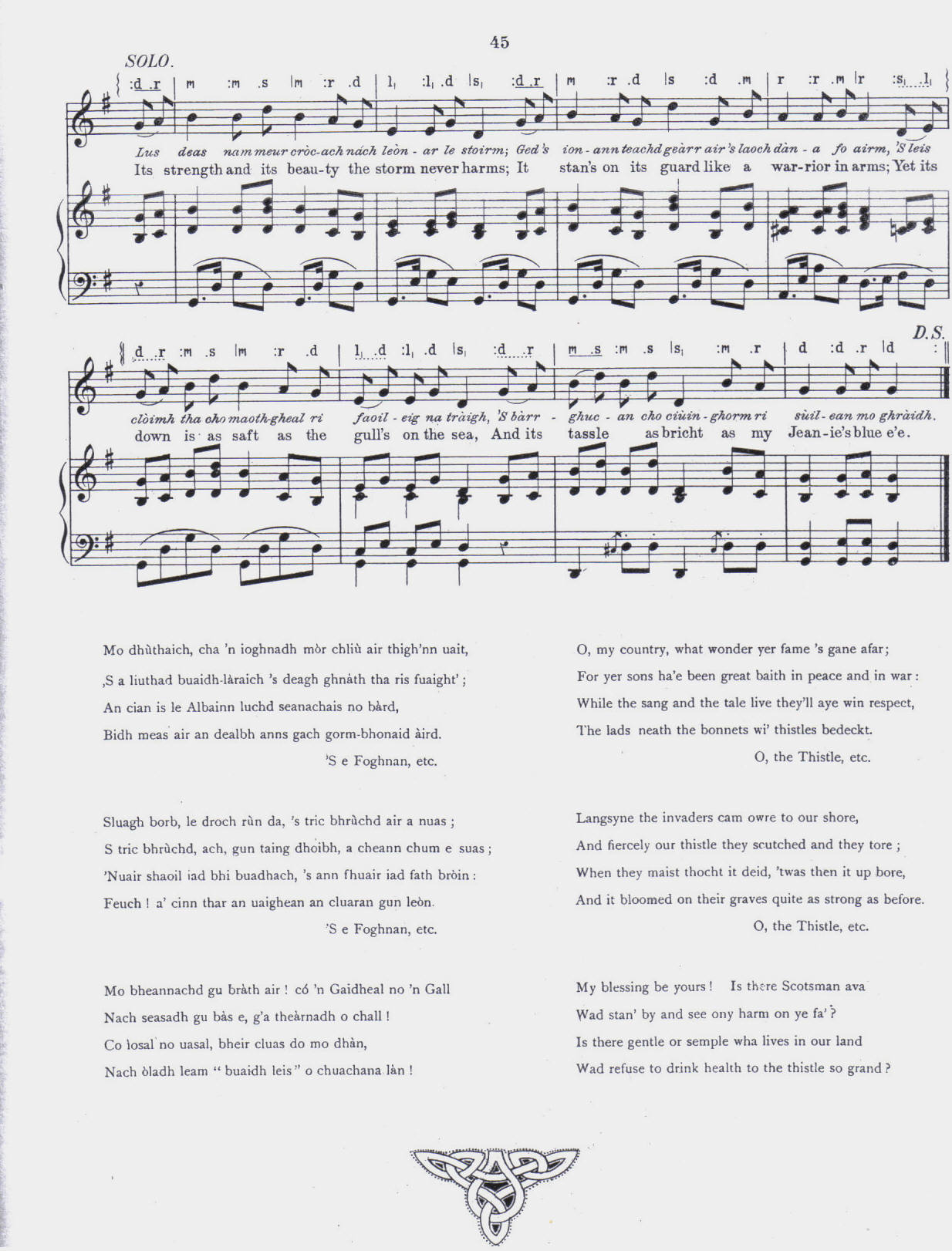
Second page of the song, p.45
