= Egyptian Theatre (disambiguation) =

Egyptian Theatre may refer to:

- The Egyptian Theatre (Boise, Idaho)
- Egyptian Theatre (Coos Bay, Oregon)
- Egyptian Theatre (DeKalb, Illinois)
- Egyptian Theatre (Delta, Colorado)
- Egyptian Theatre, Park City, Utah
- Egyptian Theater (Seattle), Washington
- Grauman's Egyptian Theatre, Hollywood, California
- Peery's Egyptian Theater (Ogden, Utah)
- Regency Academy Cinemas, formerly Bard's Egyptian Theatre, Pasadena, California
