= Hugh Thompson (architect) =

American architect

Hugh M. Thompson was an American architect. He was active in Bend, Oregon during the early 20th Century. Thompson designed the Capitol Theater, New Redmond Hotel, Old Bend High School, Redmond Union High School, the Butch Stover House and an addition to the Pilot Butte Inn. In partnership with Lee Arden Thomas, he designed the O. C. Henkle Building, C. J. Breir Store, Saint Francis School, the 1923 Kenwood School addition, the Hudson & Sather Building, the Central Oregon Bank and the Vandevert & Whitington Garage. He was a member of the American Institute of Architects, #191.

Edward Brosterhous, one of 49 Bend residents who signed its petition for incorporation in 1904 and one of the three people who incorporated the North Unit Irrigation Company, consulted on electrical and heating matters for the Episcopal Church in Bend and built St. Francis of Assisi Church and School, Old Bend High School, Kenwood School and other buildings.

Thompson was quoted as explaining building activity in the early 1920s to an increase in payrolls at the areas sawmills and a growing population. Commercial buildings under construction were already leased, while water and telephone connections doubled from 1920 to 1924.

A number of his works are listed on the National Register of Historic Places.

== Works ==
- Trinity Episcopal Church, Bend (supervising architect)
- B. A. and Ruth Stover House, NRHP-listed
- Bend Amateur Athletic Club Gymnasium
- Old Bend High School, NRHP-listed
- New Redmond Hotel, 521 S. 6th St. Redmond, OR, NRHP-listed
