= New Redmond Hotel =

- U.S. National Register of Historic Places
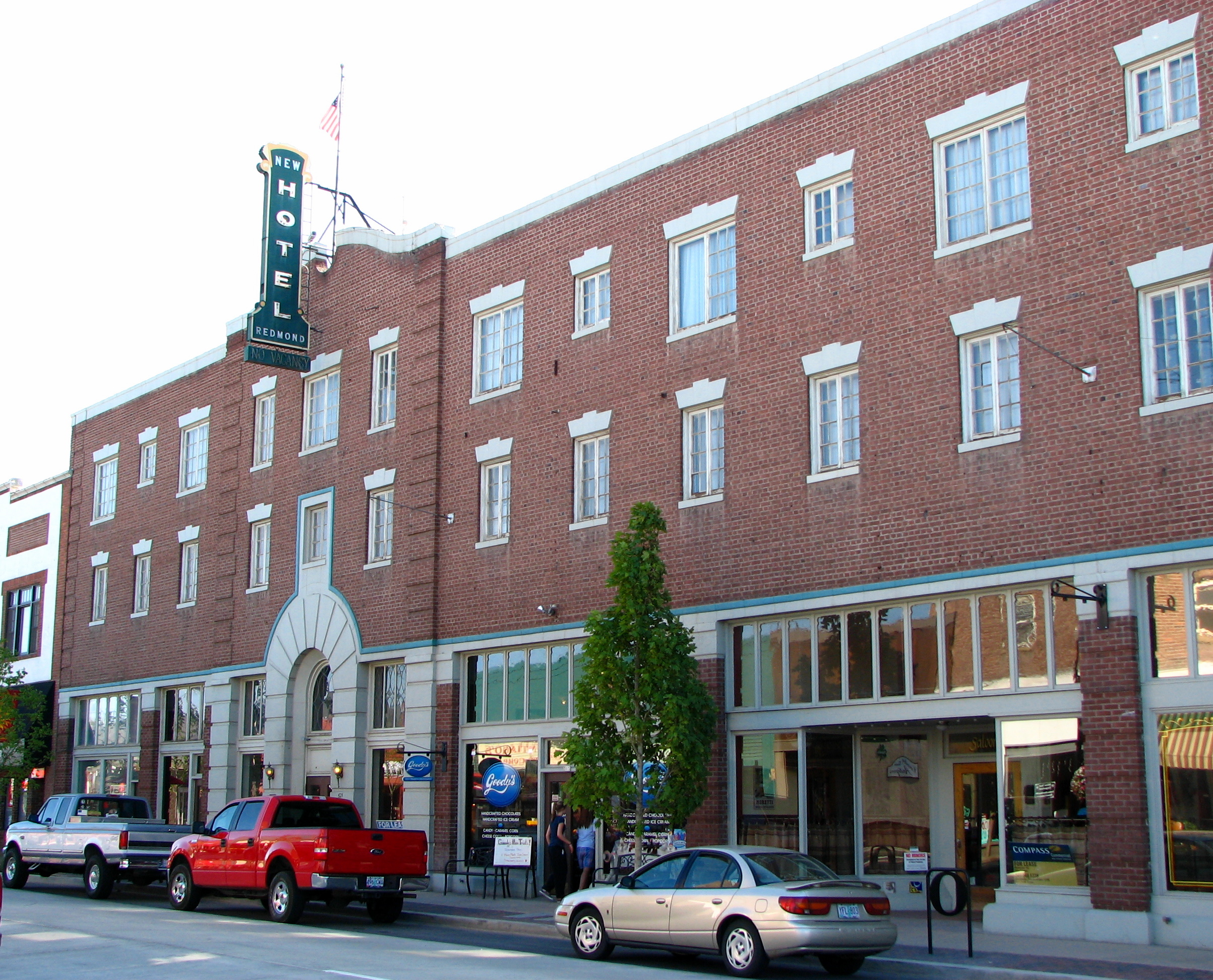
- 6th Street frontage
- Location: Redmond, Oregon, United States
- Coordinates: 44.27228°N 121.17461°W
- Built: 1928
- Architect: Hugh Thompson
- Architectural style: Georgian
- NRHP reference No.: 80003312
- Added to NRHP: 1980

The New Redmond Hotel is a historic commercial hotel in Redmond, Oregon, United States. The hotel was built in 1928 after the original Redmond Hotel, (sometimes referred to as "Hotel Redmond") was destroyed in a fire. It is a three-story Georgian-style brick masonry building located on 6th Street in downtown Redmond. It has been in continuous use as a commercial hotel since it first opened. Today, the New Redmond Hotel is a major landmark in downtown Redmond. Because of its importance to the history of Redmond, the New Redmond Hotel is listed on the National Register of Historic Places. On August 1, 2019, Soul Community Planet announced that after a two-year, $7 million renovation, The New Hotel Redmond by SCP (or SCP Redmond) opened in the Fall of 2019. The 41,000 square-foot, 49-room hotel, was redeveloped in partnership with the city of Redmond. The Rooftop, a 1,500 square-foot rooftop social garden (restaurant / bar), was added, opened in August. The redevelopment was made possible through a public-private partnership between the city of Redmond and the developer – a partnership managed by Alpha Wave Investors and RevOZ Capital. The city of Redmond, through its Redmond Urban Renewal Agency, provided a $3.53 million investment in the project.

In 2020, The New Redmond Hotel by SCP (or SCP Redmond) was awarded the DeMuro Award for Excellence in Historic Preservation through Restore Oregon along with ten other historic projects from across Oregon.

== Old hotel ==
The original two-story Redmond Hotel was built in 1906 by William and Fanny Wilson. The Wilson's arrived in Redmond in 1905 after making a modest fortune in Alaska selling supplies to miners during the Klondike gold rush. Once in Redmond, they became active community boosters, organizing a businessmen's group that meet weekly to discuss civic affairs. In 1911 the hotel made the papers, and again in 1914, when the Jones Land Company was excavating for a septic tank in the rear of the hotel. The workmen had dug 19 feet through solid rock and drilled an additional 10 more feet before setting dynamite. The explosion of the dynamite was anticlimactic after a dull sound followed and cold, heavy-pressured air issued out. It was assumed a cavern was punctured and that it would make for a suitable septic tank. The discovery made the local papers and Hotel Oregon across the street wanted to locate their own cavern and eventually did. By 1914, the piping in the Redmond Hotel became clogged after use of the outlet increased. Another hole was drilled in the hotel and larger piping installed. The new setup was found to be adequate for disposal.

== New hotel ==
In June 1927, the original wood-frame hotel burned to the ground. However, the Wilson's quickly replaced the original hotel with a new one. Construction of the New Redmond Hotel began on 17 June 1927. In the building's cornerstone community leaders place a time capsule containing coins, photographs, newspapers with reports of the recent hotel fire, and other community related documents. The new hotel cost approximately $150,000 to build. When it was completed, the hotel had 43,000 square feet (4,000 m^{2}) of interior space. The hotel's grand opening was held on 27 July 1928. The event included tours of the new hotel, a banquet with 350 guests, and a community dance. A meeting of the Central Oregon Jersey Breeders was held in conjunction with the grand opening. The hotel's early advertisements boosted that the New Redmond Hotel provided the best lodging and service east of the Cascade Mountains at the lowest possible prices, only $1 to $2.50 per day.

The New Redmond Hotel quickly became a popular social center for the growing Redmond community as well as a well known lodging stop for travelers passing through Central Oregon. The primary function of the building has always been a hotel. However, the hotel lobby served as the home for the local Chamber of Commerce for a time, and as the Redmond bus station since it was conveniently located on Highway 97 which followed 6th Street though town. Today, the hotel remains one of the largest and best known buildings in the city of Redmond. It is also one of the few surviving examples of early 20th century Georgian architecture in Central Oregon. Because of its importance to Redmond history and its distinctive Georgian architecture, the New Redmond Hotel was listed on the National Register of Historic Places on 28 October 1980. In 1993, the hotel was extensively remodeled, modernizing the structure while maintaining the building's historic character. The hotel underwent an extensive, two-year $7 million renovation, which was completed in 2019.

== Structure ==
New Redmond Hotel heritage walk marker

The New Redmond Hotel is located on the southwest corner of 6th Street and West Evergreen Avenue in downtown Redmond. It is a three-story brick masonry building with a footprint of 150 feet (46 m) by 100 feet (30 m). The hotel is a good example of Georgian-style architecture. It was designed by Bend architect, Hugh Thompson. The building was constructed by a local contracting firm led by Ole K. Olson and his partner S. Elmer Erickson. Another general contractor, Fred N. VanMatre, also helped with the construction.

On the first floor, there are six commercial store fronts with large display windows, three facing 6th Street and three facing West Evergreen Avenue. The display windows are separated by wide brick pillars. Above the display windows are glass transom windows. The hotel entrance faces 6th Street. The entrance is marked by a large round archway with flanking bay windows. The upper stories of the building are faced with brick. The second and third floors both have fifteen casement windows facing 6th Street and eight facing Evergreen Avenue. On the third floor, window size alternates between large and small size across the facade. There is a ninth window bay on the Evergreen Avenue side of the building that does not have a window on either upper floor. The hotel's interior fire escape stairwell is behind that bay. Above the entrance extending out toward the street is a vertical marquee announcing the name of the hotel. The sign rises above the rounded cornice that tops the third floor above the hotel entrance. It is 45 feet (14 m) from the sidewalk in front of the entrance to the top of the cornice, making the hotel the tallest building in Redmond.

In 2019, The Rooftop (bar/restaurant) was added. The intimate 1,500-square-foot indoor / outdoor garden setting provides panoramic views of the Cascade Range, including Three Sisters volcanic peaks (known as Faith, Hope and Charity), Mount Bachelor, Black Butte, and Smith Rock State Park. The Rooftop offers locally inspired small plate menu, along with handcrafted cocktails featuring herbs, fruit and spices – some of which will be grown organically in The Rooftop’s own gardens.

== Interior ==
Originally, the main public spaces inside the hotel were the main lobby and dining/banquet room both with high ceilings and square side-columns crowned by Corinthian capitals. The focal point of the hotel lobby was a large stone-faced fireplace, which still remains. The lobby was furnished with a mixture of antiques and modern furniture pieces. The original floor in the lobby was fir and later covered with black and white linoleum squares, laid out in a checkerboard pattern. The lobby carpet was patterned after an oriental rug. The banquet room had hardwood floors.

An elevator, installed in the 1940s, takes guests to the upper floors. The number of hotel rooms has varied over the years. In 1980, when this building was listed on the National Register of Historic Places, there were 29 overnight rooms and 28 longer-term apartment rooms plus two executive suites, one known as the Governor’s Suite. The rooms have high ceilings and tall windows with the hotel's original woodwork still in place. The hotels heating and cooling plants were located in the basement.

The redevelopment of the hotel, SCP Redmond Hotel, opened with 49 guest rooms and suites in 2019 after a two-year renovation. The renovation took much of the vintage structure down to its historic bones, replacing outdated infrastructure with modern and efficient plumbing, electrical, and HVAC systems. This included use of green materials and eco-friendly products and added features such as living green walls on the rooftop and in the Commons studio. The hotel's historic grand staircase, high ceilings, and the original 1928 fireplace constructed out of locally sourced lava rock all remain and welcome guests arriving in the lobby. The first floor also includes Provisions Market, offering healthy food options in a café setting, Wayfarer Club, serving craft cocktails and thoughtfully created fresh tasty food options, SCP Commons providing 1,500 of creative co-working and event space with conference rooms, a business center, meditation room, and an SCP Fit space for individual health and wellness as well as group classes.

== See also ==
- National Register of Historic Places listings in Deschutes County, Oregon
