= Memorial Union (Oregon State University) =

Building on the Oregon State University campus in Corvallis, Oregon, U.S.

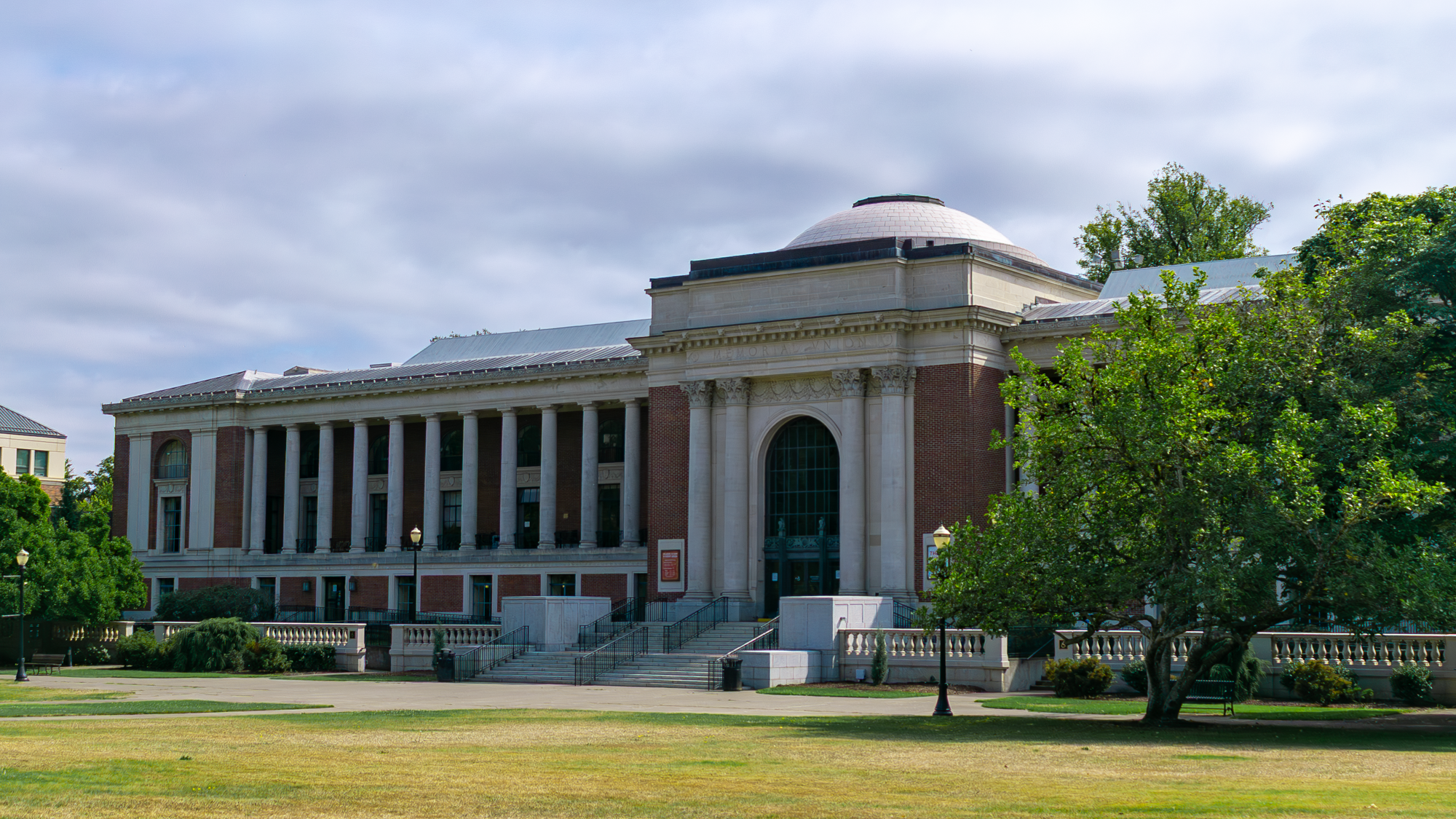
- North side of the building

General information
- Type: student activity center
- Architectural style: Neoclassical
- Location: Corvallis, Oregon, United States, 2501 SW Jefferson Way, Corvallis, Oregon
- Coordinates: 44.5650°N 123.2789°W
- Current tenants: MU Commons
- Construction started: 1926
- Completed: 1928
- Owner: Oregon State University

Height
- Height: 3 stories

Technical details
- Floor count: 4

Design and construction
- Architect: Lee Arden Thomas

The Memorial Union (MU) is the student activity center at Oregon State University in Corvallis, Oregon, USA. It contains a ballroom, cafeteria, bowling alley, shops, and study areas. It was designed by Oregon Agricultural College (a predecessor of OSU) graduate Lee Arden Thomas.

== History ==
The idea to build the Memorial Union building originally came from veterans Warren Daigh and Tony Schille, Oregon State students. Their vision was that the building would be in commemoration of their fellow soldiers who had been killed in the line of duty during WWI. Groundbreaking occurred March 3, 1926.

The building was funded entirely with private donations and gifts at a cost of around $750,000, and a $3 per term assessment Oregon State students implemented beginning in January 1922. Memorial Union opened to the public on June 1, 1928. It was dedicated on June 1, 1929, by Judge James K. Weatherford, chair of the OAC Board of Regents.

Multiple original architect's conceptions from 1925 included a prominent bell-tower, never constructed.

It is of Neoclassical design by OSU engineering and architecture graduate Lee Thomas, with an exterior built mainly with red-colored bricks with white granite accents including a dome in the center.

The MU is the smallest union building in the Pac-12, and the oldest.

The building is one of the few OSU buildings of that era not attributed to John Bennes, and has been described as "one of the finest examples of neoclassic architecture in Oregon." Thomas, the building's architect, was an alumnus based in Portland.

The east and west wings (restaurant and commons) are later additions, having been added in 1960 and extensively renovated in the 1990s; the MU was owned by the Memorial Union Corporation until 1965 when it transferred the facility to the State Board of Higher Education.

It has been "known to generations of Oregon Staters as simply the MU".
