= Egyptian-style theatre =

Type of cinema

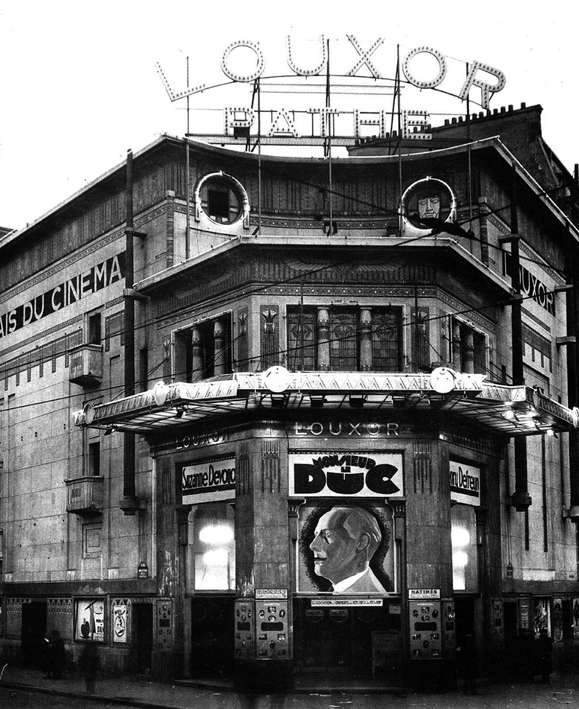
Le Louxor cinema, Paris, 1930

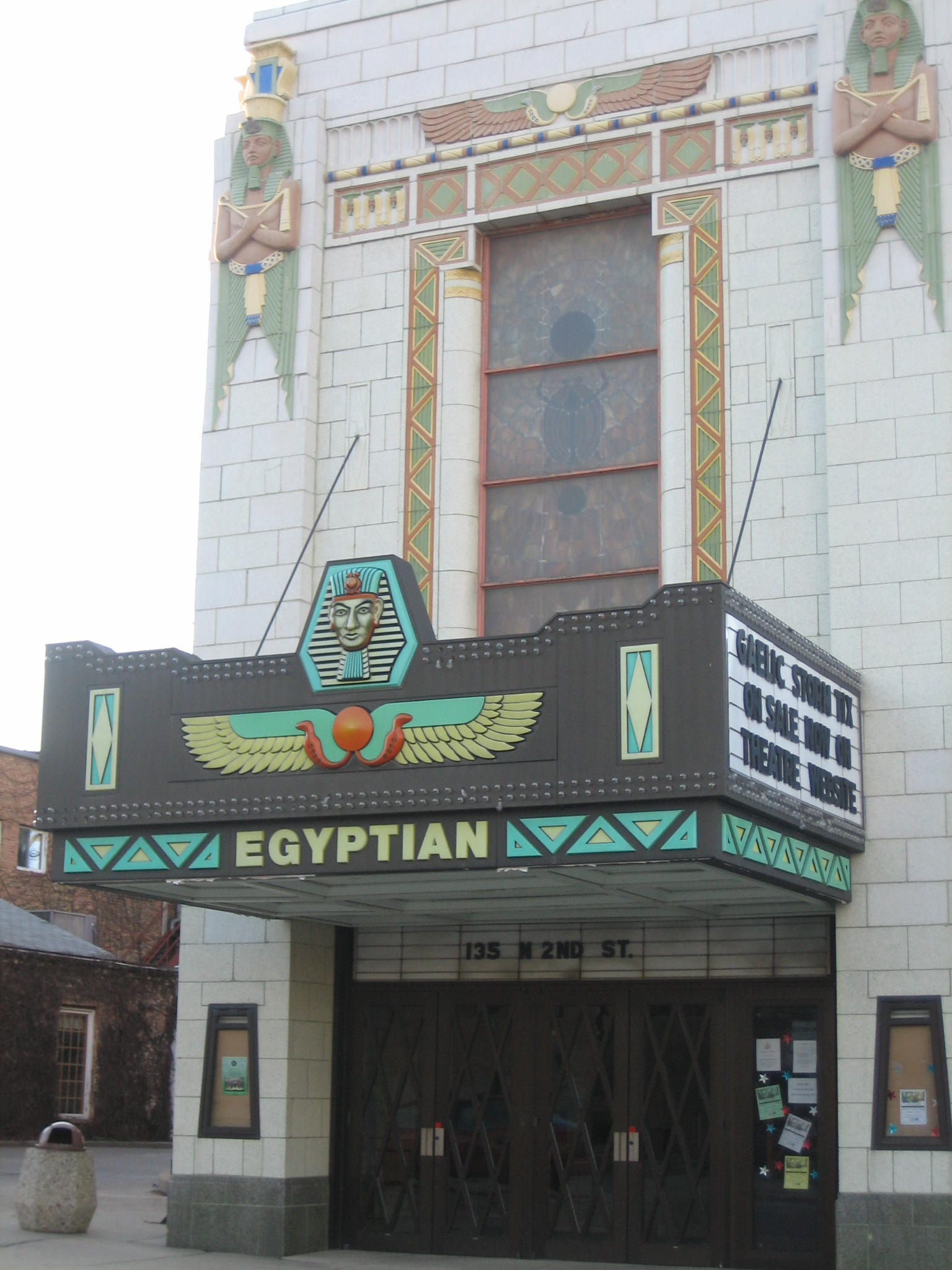
Egyptian Theatre, DeKalb, Illinois. National Register of Historic Places.

Egyptian-style theatres are based on the traditional and historic design elements of Ancient Egypt. In the early 20th century, these theatres emerged internationally, with notable examples including Le Louxor in Paris (1921) and Grauman's Egyptian Theatre in Hollywood (1922). It is estimated that up to 100 of these theatre types were constructed across the United States alone. Many no longer exist, but fine examples of this style remain in use today. Most theatres built during this time period were part of the wave of Egyptian Revival architecture that occurred after the November 1922 discovery of King Tut's tomb by Howard Carter.

== History ==
=== Early examples ===
The Eldorado Theatre located in Eldorado Amusement Park, Weehawken, New Jersey opened in 1891 and featured 'Egypt Through Centuries' each evening. The creators of the park, Palisades Amusement and Exhibition Company, published a book titled Egypt Through the Centuries in 1892.

The style gained broader recognition with Le Louxor in Paris, which opened in 1921 with elaborate Egyptian Revival architecture.

=== Grauman's Egyptian Theatre ===
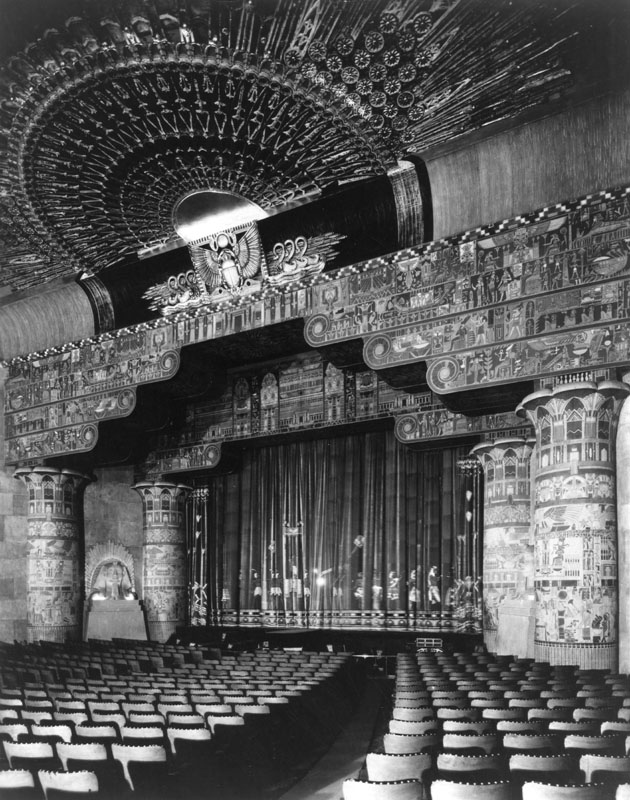
Grauman's Egyptian Theatre, 1922

The most influential Egyptian theatre was Grauman's Egyptian Theatre in Hollywood, California, opened in 1922. For several years, Hollywood developer Charles E. Toberman attempted to convince Sid Grauman to locate in Hollywood. During a meeting, Sid told Toberman of his desire to build a theatre of Egyptian design. Toberman then secured a piece of property on Hollywood Boulevard, just east of McCadden Place. The architectural firm of Meyer & Holler was hired to design the theatre. The result was Grauman's Egyptian Theatre, with a seating of 1770. The approach to the theatre was through a courtyard in an ornate style evoking ancient Egypt, while inside, the stage was flanked by carved columns and models of the Sphinx. The theatre was opened on October 19, 1922, with the grand premiere of Robin Hood starring Douglas Fairbanks.

=== Egyptian Revival wave ===
Many theatres that followed Grauman's design were part of the wave of Egyptian Revival architecture that occurred after the November 1922 discovery of King Tut's tomb by Howard Carter. Both Le Louxor and Grauman's Egyptian Theatre were designed, built, and opened before the discovery of King Tut's tomb. The news of the tomb's discovery reached the US a few weeks after Grauman's theatre opened, spurring additional construction of Egyptian-style venues.

== Restoration and preservation ==
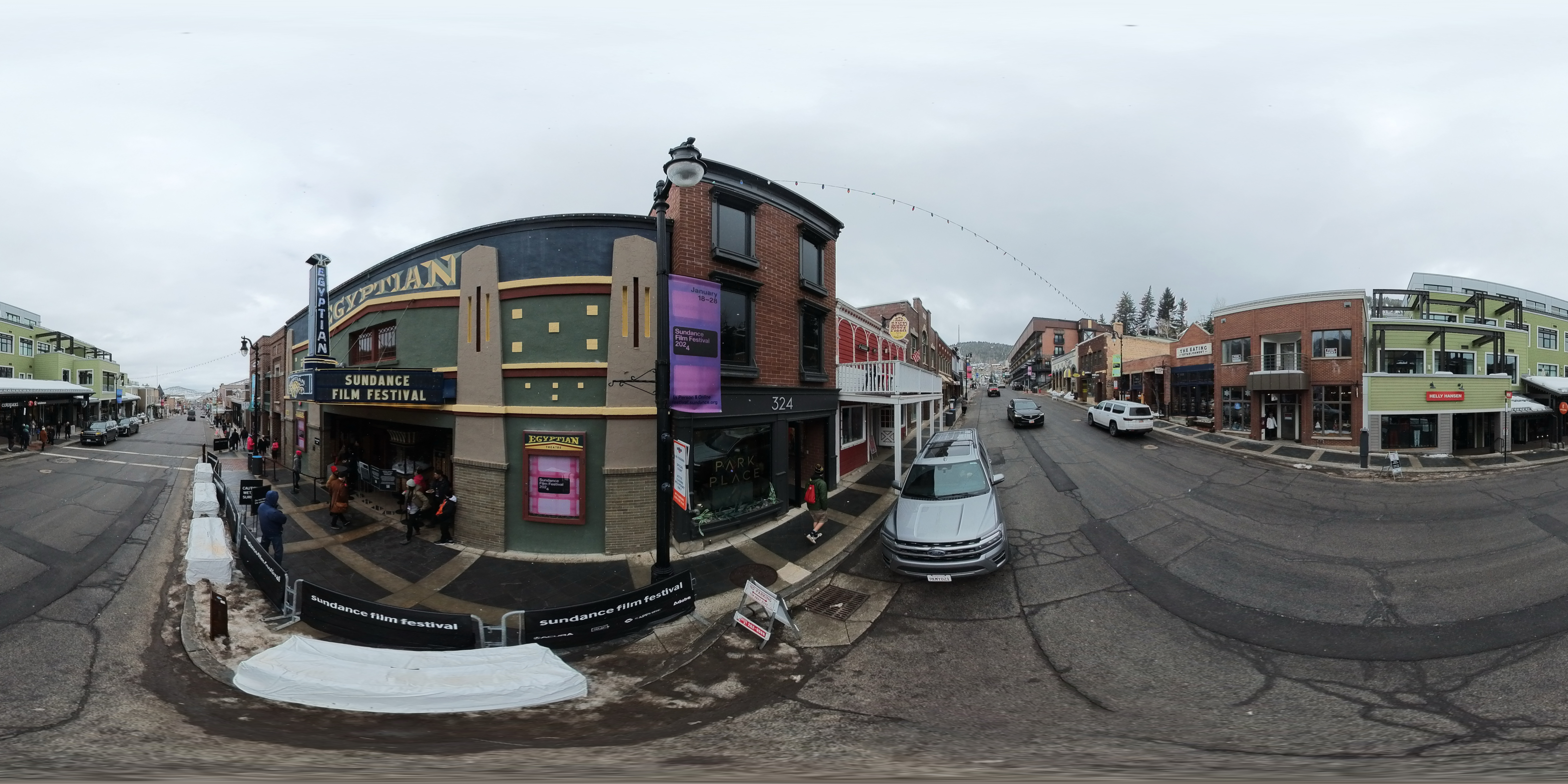
Mary G. Steiner Egyptian Theatre in Park City, Utah during the Sundance Film Festival 2024 (view as a 360° interactive panorama)

In a 1983 article in Hollywood Studio Magazine, Mike Hughes wrote of the Egyptian: "A survivor of the decay that unfortunately characterizes the Hollywood Boulevard of today, the Egyptian is a reminder of the glamour that once made the Boulevard famous. Perhaps through the dedicated efforts of citizens like Bruce Torrence, author of Hollywood: The First 100 Years and grandson of Mr. Charles Toberman, who built the Egyptian, the Hollywood Boulevard of yesteryear will reappear some great day in the future. When that happens, the Egyptian Theatre, jewel that it is, will be there to herald in the new age of film town." United Artists was the last owner of the Egyptian Theatre before it closed in 1992. The American Cinematheque purchased the theatre from the city for $1 with the provision "that this historical landmark would be restored to its original grandeur and re-opened as a movie theatre showcasing the organization's celebrated public programming."

Conrad Schmitt Studios has played a big part in the restoration of these atmospheric theatres, including Egyptian Theatres in Park City, Utah; Ogden, Utah; Boise, Idaho; Delta, Colorado; and DeKalb, Illinois.

== Theatres in this style ==
Opened	Theatre name	Location	Status	Ref.
1921	Le Louxor	Paris, France	Active	
1922	Grauman's Egyptian Theatre	Hollywood, California	Active	
1923	Bush Egyptian Theatre	San Diego, California	Demolished 2003	
1924	Peery's Egyptian Theatre	Ogden, Utah	Active	
1925	Egyptian Theatre	Coos Bay, Oregon	Active	
1925	Bard's Egyptian Theatre	Pasadena, California	Remodeled 1957–1958	
1926	Mary G. Steiner Egyptian Theatre	Park City, Utah	Active	
1926	Bala Theatre	Bala Cynwyd, Pennsylvania	Closed 2014	
1927	Capitol Center for the Arts	Concord, New Hampshire	Active	
1927	The Egyptian Theatre	Boise, Idaho	Active	
1927	Empress Theatre	Montreal, Quebec, Canada	Closed 1992	
1928	Egyptian Theatre	Delta, Colorado	Active	
1929	Egyptian Theatre	DeKalb, Illinois	Active	
1975	The Moore Egyptian	Seattle, Washington	Closed 1980	
1980	SIFF Cinema Egyptian	Seattle, Washington	Active	
2000	Cinemark Egyptian 24 and XD	Hanover, Maryland	Active	

== See also ==
- Egyptomania
