= Peery's Egyptian Theater =

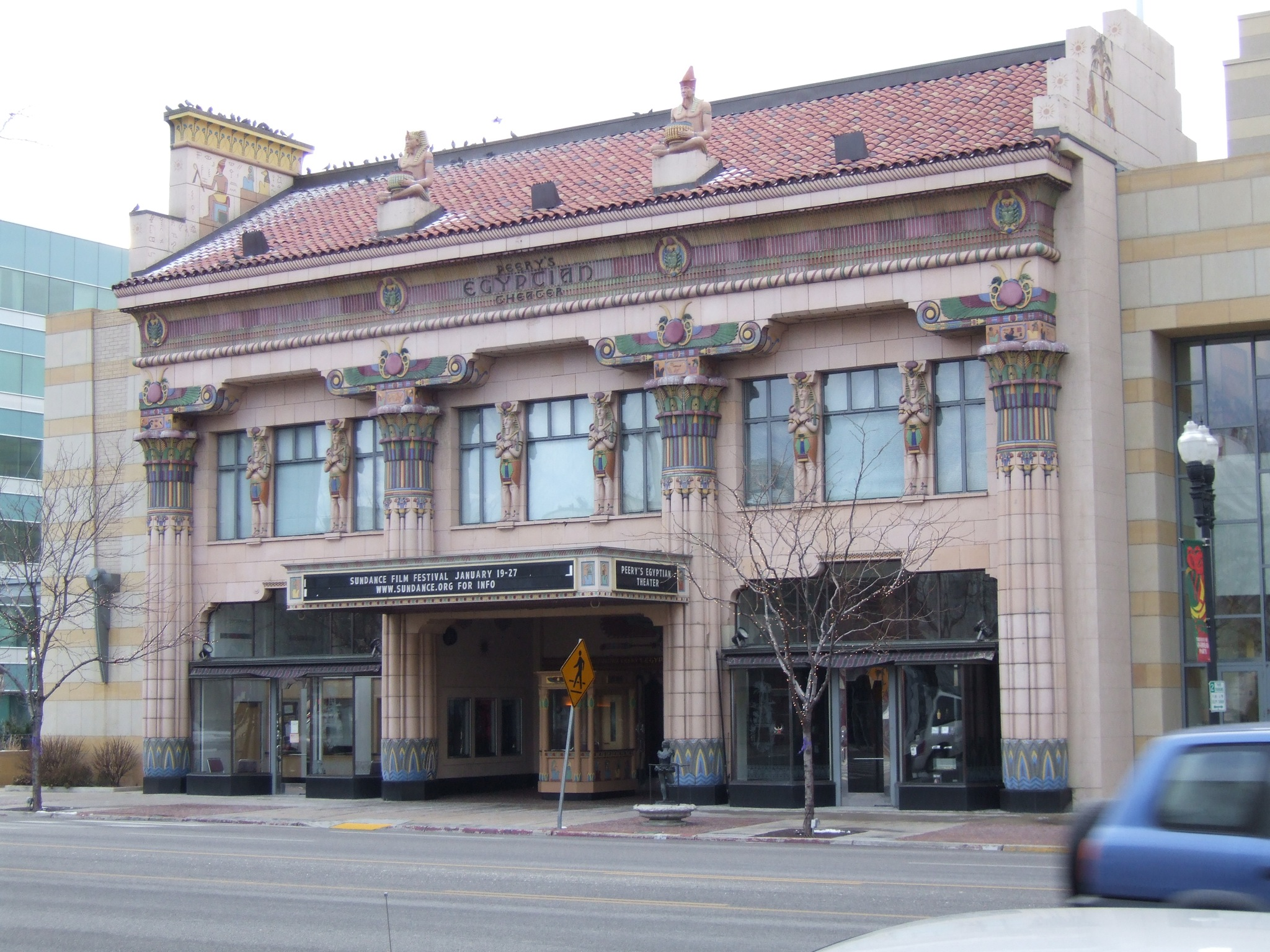
- Interactive map of Peery's Egyptian Theater
- Address: 2439 Washington Blvd. Ogden, Utah; United States
- Capacity: 800
- Type: Movie palace
- Designation: 41.221823°N 111.970923°W
- Current use: Performing Arts Center and Movies

Construction
- Opened: 1924
- Rebuilt: 1997
- Architects: Leslie S. Hodgson & Myrl A. McClenahan, F. Berne

Website
- Official website
- Peery's Egyptian Theater
- U.S. National Register of Historic Places
- Architectural style: Late 19th and 20th Century Revivals
- NRHP reference No.: 78002714
- Added to NRHP: December 12, 1978

Peery's Egyptian Theater is a movie palace located in Ogden, Utah, United States. It was added to the National Register of Historic Places in 1978.

== History ==
Peery's Egyptian Theater was built after the fiery demise of the Arlington Hotel in 1923. Harman and Louis Peery devised a plan to build a grand theater, "The Showplace of the West". The architectural firm of Hodgson & McClenahan, notable for many important Wasatch Front landmarks, was hired for the task. They took cues from many of the most famous western theaters, including Grauman's Egyptian Theatre in Hollywood, and settled upon an Egyptian-themed showhouse.

Construction began in 1923 on the cleared area left from the Arlington Hotel, and incidentally, the location of the Peerys' first Ogden home. Ten months passed, and on July 3, 1924, the Egyptian opened. The first feature played at the new theater was Zane Grey's Wanderer of the Wasteland. This "natural color" silent film was accompanied by the Mighty Wurlitzer, the Egyptian's famous pipe organ.

The first "talking picture" was In Old Arizona, shown in 1929. This downgraded the role of the house pipe organ, which was occasionally used during intermissions and other programs. In 1960, the organ was removed and put into storage.

Twentieth Century-Fox, the chain to which the Egyptian belonged, incorporated in 1935. Both of the Peery's theaters, the Egyptian and the Ogden, were leased by Fox Inter-Mountain Theaters as a result. A renovation of the theater's entrance increased the marquee size fourfold and added new box office and a new ceiling to the lobby. In 1951, Fox refurbished the Egyptian, adding many new and more splendid details to the theater.

1953 saw the arrival of two new and important events for the theater. The 3D movie It Came from Outer Space was shown, a first of that type for the house, and then The Robe, a CinemaScope film, debuted. The format of CinemaScope, of more than two-to-one ratio in width versus height, necessitated the removal of two of the inner-proscenium columns. A four-channel high-fidelity system was also installed to accommodate the increasing significance of stereophonic sound in movies.

The subsequent remodeling in 1961 was met with mixed reactions. Many of the details of the original theater were painted over or removed. Pink curtains were accompanied by pink auditorium walls. A new, wider and larger screen was installed in front of the proscenium. Seating was also reconfigured, reducing capacity from 1,200 to 850 in an effort to increase the legroom and comfort of patrons. A reconditioning of the seats also occurred, further updating the standards.

In the following years, many different iterations of what was known as the Fox Inter-Mountain Corporation would keep the Egyptian at the forefront of the local theater scene. It showed first-run movies well into the early 1980s, when management passed to a smaller local chain. Lacking the presence and funding needed for first-run movies, the theater progressed to a second-run theater shortly before it was closed in 1984, due to a health code violation.

Many thought that the glory days of the Egyptian were over, and that there was no future for a classic, single-screen theater in Ogden. The theater was threatened on many occasions with demolition, as it sat, boarded up and unused. Rumors abounded until the theater was finally purchased, in the eleventh hour, for the original 1924 construction price of $250,000. Facilitated by the Weber County Heritage Foundation, the building was handed over to the Egyptian Theater Foundation, which was created as a means to facilitate the refurbishment of the classic showhouse. First Ogden City, then Weber County were given ownership of the building.

A complete restoration was accomplished with the partnership of Weber County, Ogden City, Weber State University, the Egyptian Theater Foundation, and the Ogden/Weber Chamber of Commerce. Major donations and contributions from Dr. Louis S. and Jan Peery, the George S. and Delores Dore Eccles Foundation, and the Utah State Legislature were received among hundreds of other smaller gifts. The adjoining David Eccles Conference Center and the Weber County government office, located in a renovated department store, were built and completed during this period.

The rescued Egyptian Theater reopened on January 17, 1997. Its role was expanded from a movie house to that of a community theater/performing arts house. A Wurlitzer pipe organ was reinstalled in 2004, completing the historic atmosphere of the theater.

In its more recent history the theater has shown classical plays and live musical performances; many Wurlitzer Theatre Pipe Organ performances, classic and documentary films as well as children's films. Annual performances of The Nutcracker ballet during the Christmas season are very popular. The Sundance Film Festival has screened movies at Peery's Egyptian Theatre since 1998. Several community events are held regularly at the theater.

== Significance ==
Peery's Egyptian Theater

The 800-seat showhouse used a solid, poured concrete construction in order to increase the safety of the occupants and resist fire—a common killer of theaters and their patrons. In a test of the building's strength, over 70,000 lbs. of gravel were put onto the top of the auditorium. The load barely flexed the roof, proving the strength of construction. The theater's owners told the public that the Egyptian was "Ogden's Only Fireproof Theater ... A Safe Place for the Kiddies," in large letters on the rear of the building.

The Egyptian is one of a few theaters to incorporate an "atmospheric" ceiling, where a daytime or dusk ambiance can be smoothly changed into one of a star-filled nighttime sky. This effect remains in operation at the present. The terra cotta facade, with its intricate colors and details intact, remains in excellent condition after over 80 years.

The seating area comprises one level, steeply raked for a nearly ideal viewing angle without resorting to steps. The seats are split into three parts, with a wide center and two smaller side seating areas to either side. Foot and knee room are comfortable, and the seats are comfortably reclined. The seating area also clings to its roots by using wood-backed seats and no modern-era cupholders.

The theater is one of fewer than fifty Egyptian-style theaters that were constructed in the country; only a dozen or so still stand. The "atmospheric" ceiling is likely one of two that currently exist in use throughout the United States. The Egyptian remains Utah's only bona fide "movie palace."

== See also ==
- National Register of Historic Places listings in Weber County, Utah
- Egyptian Theatre (Coos Bay, Oregon)
- Grauman's Egyptian Theatre
- Mary G. Steiner Egyptian Theatre
- The Egyptian Theatre (Boise, Idaho)
- Egyptian Theatre (DeKalb, Illinois)
