= Lee Arden Thomas =

American architect (1886–1953)

- Born: February 27, 1886; Germantown, Nebraska
- Died: 1953
- Education: Oregon State University
- Occupation: Architect

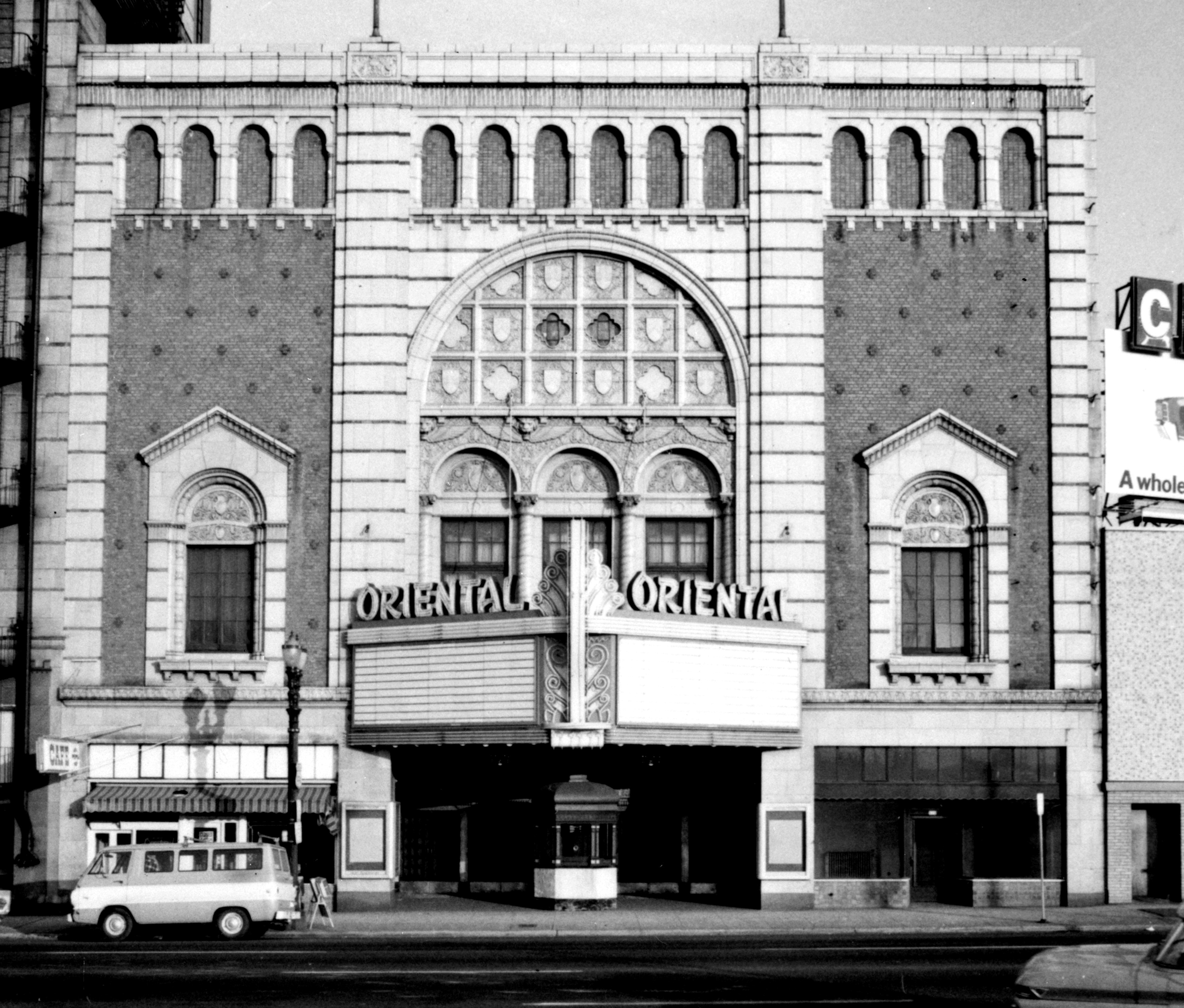
Oriental Theatre's main entrance, photographed November 1969

Lee Arden Thomas (1886–1953) was an architect in Bend and Portland, Oregon, United States. He graduated in 1907 from Oregon State University in engineering and architecturte. He completed many projects in Bend, often partnering with local architect Hugh Thompson. His work in that area includes the planning for Bend Amateur Athletic Club Gymnasium (1917–1918), Redmond Union High School, and the Washington School in Corvallis (now known as the Benton Center).

Thomas was an architect in Bend during the 1910s. His work in the area includes the Lew Franks Building, St. Francis Catholic Church, St. Charles Hospital, First Methodist Church, Bend Amateur Athletic Club and the new Central School. He later formed a partnership with another Bend architect, Hugh Thompson. The pair designed the O. C. Henkle Building, Kenwood School, the Central Oregon Bank, and the Vandevert & Whitington Garage.

In Portland, Thomas helped design the Weatherly Building with Sutton & Whitney and partnered with Albert Mercier on the adjacent Oriental Theatre (1927), as well as several other theaters. He also designed the Memorial Union (MU) at Oregon State University.

Thomas was also a member of the Oregon Board of Architect Examiners and the group's treasurer.

== In Bend, Oregon ==
In Bend, Oregon, Thomas worked with local architect Hugh Thompson. Thomas designed the Bend Amateur Athletic Club (1918) and Old Bend High School (1925). Both use lava rock as foundation material laid out as uncut rubble.

Lee Thomas designed Redmond Union High School, "the largest and most impressive structure in all of Redmond". The $100,000 building was constructed by "famed Central Oregon contactors, Olson & Erickson" using about 400,000 bricks from the Bend brick yard and "served a district of over 500 square miles." A gymnasium was added by Freeman & Hayslip of Portland in 1944 "under the supervision of A.W. Manchester of Julius Johnson Construction, the gym was completed in January 1945."

The O. C. Henkle Building remains in use and plans are underway for its renovations.

== Memorial Union ==
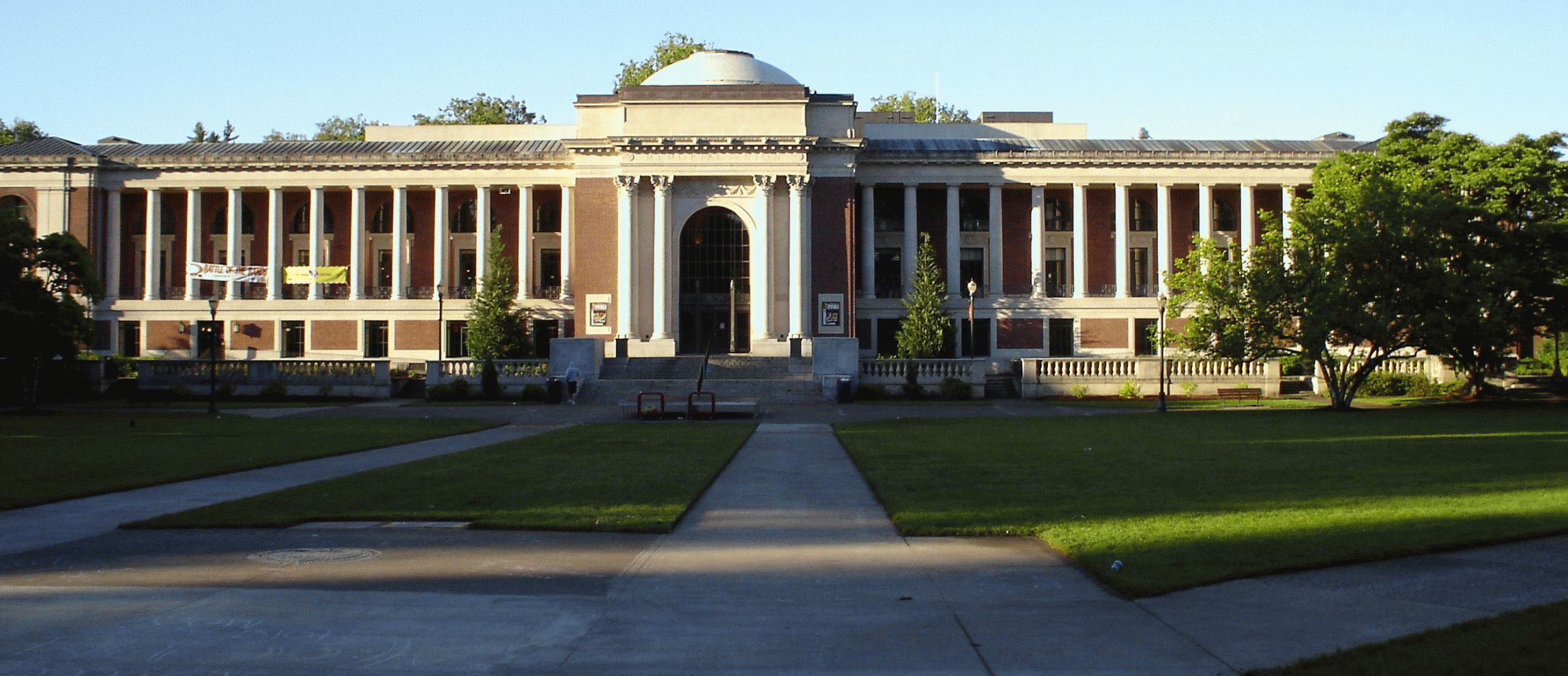
Oregon State University's Memorial Union ("MU") was designed by Thomas, who graduated from the school's predecessor, Oregon Agricultural College

Thomas designed the Memorial Union (MU) on Oregon State University's (OSU) campus, said to be "one of the finest examples of Neoclassical architecture in Oregon." It was one of the few OSU buildings of that era not attributed to John Bennes, and has been "known to generations of Oregon Staters as simply the "MU".

It "was built in 1927-28 as a monument to those who have given their lives in defense of the nation, as well as a center for student life on campus." The building was funded entirely with private donations and gifts at a cost of around $750,000, and a $3 per term assessment Oregon State students implemented beginning in January 1922. It was dedicated on June 1, 1929. The east and west wings (bookstore and commons) are later additions that were added in 1960 and extensively renovated in the 1990s. The MU was owned by the Memorial Union Corporation until 1965 when it transferred the facility to the State Board of Higher Education.

== Washington School (Benton Center) ==
Thomas designed the Washington School, a somewhat eclectic Classical Revival or Neo-Classical-style building in Corvallis, Oregon. It has plaster pilasters framing the main entryway as well as a Tuscan portico with cast stone columns including capitals and apophyge. The columns support an architrave, frieze and corona.

The building is one of the most elaborate buildings in the area from the 1920s and is "one of the oldest extant Corvallis school buildings". It is a two-story brick building with wood framing, a high masonry foundation, and a full basement. "Only Corvallis' former Methodist Church South and the former Congregational Church '(currently, a National Register property)' are comparable in terms of style." Additions were made in 1952 by the architectural firm of Gathercoal and Jeppsen and in 1954 by "Jeppsen, architect". L. N. Traver was the contractor, D. W. Powell and Oregon Architectural College's "Professor Peck" did the surrounding landscape design. The school closed in 1975 and the building was purchased by Linn-Benton Community College for use as an extension center.

== Movie theaters ==
Thomas partnered with Albert Mercier on the design of several historic movie theaters including the Egyptian Theater in Coos Bay, Oregon; McDonald Theatre in Eugene, Oregon; Portland, Oregon's Blue Mouse Theatre and Bagdad Theatre; The Bobwhite Theatre in Portland Oregon 1924, They also designed the Oriental Theater for George Weatherly next to the ice cream businessman's Weatherly Building.

== Projects ==
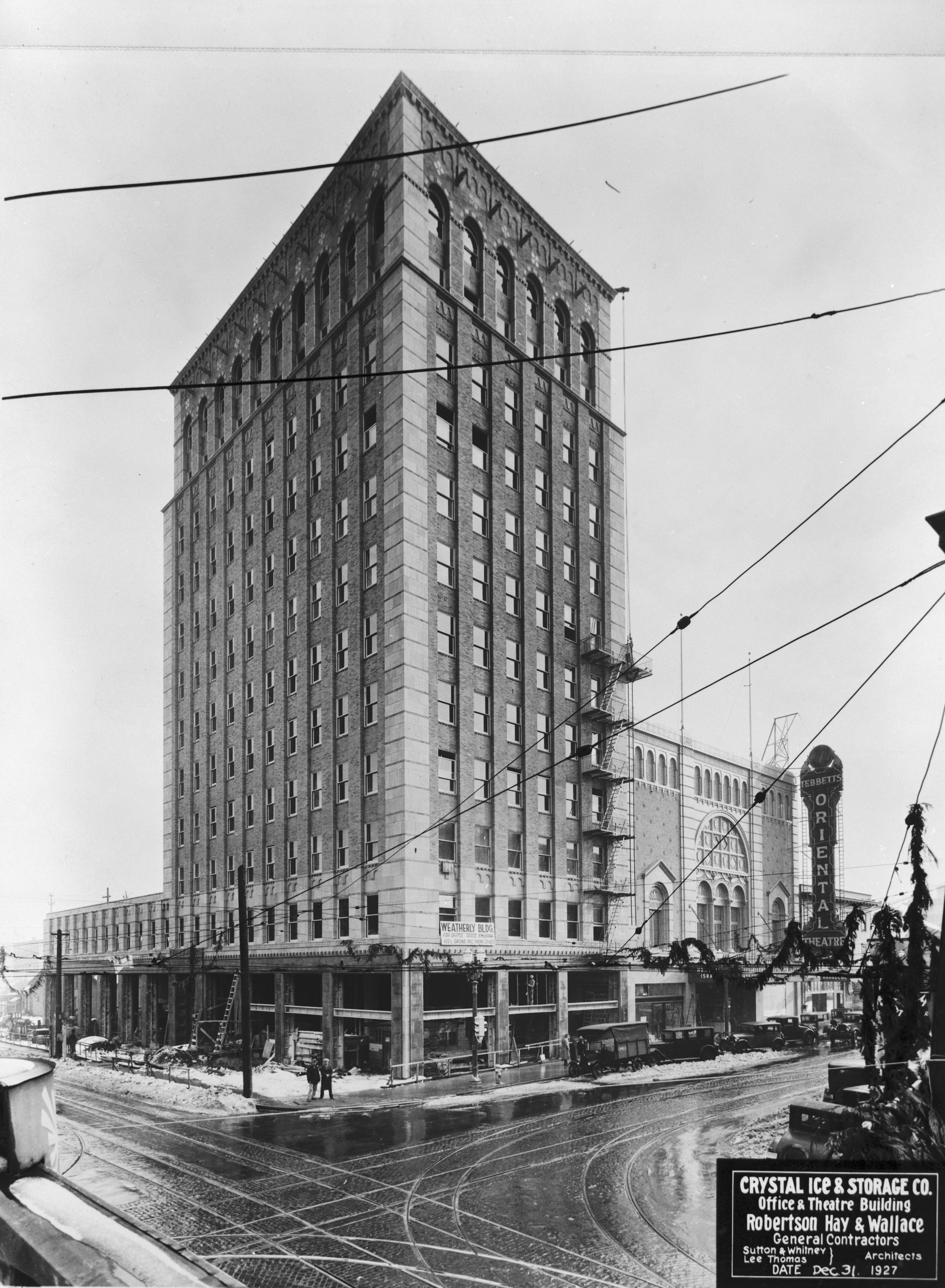
Weatherly Building and Oriental Theatre photographed as "Crystal Ice & Storage Co. Office & Theatre building", December 31, 1927

- Bend Amateur Athletic Club Gymnasium (1918)
- J. C. Braly House (1926)
- Weatherly Building (1927) with Sutton & Whitney
- Oriental Theatre (1927)
- Memorial Union, Oregon State University (1927–1928)
