= Egyptian Theatre (Coos Bay, Oregon) =

- U.S. National Register of Historic Places
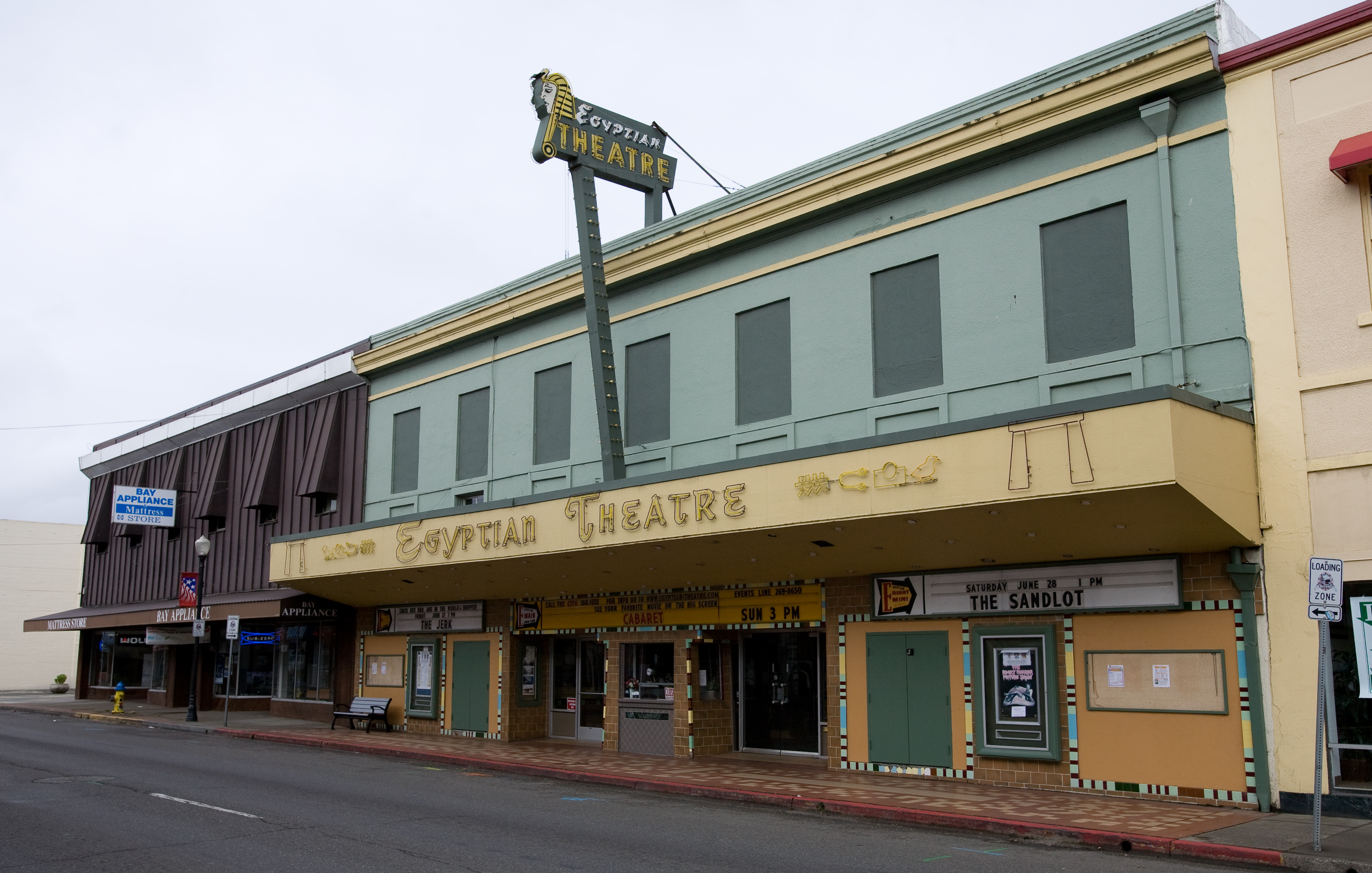

- Location within Oregon Location within the United States
- Location: 229 S. Broadway, Coos Bay, Oregon
- Coordinates: 43.36680°N 124.21315°W
- Area: less than 1 acre (0.40 ha)
- Website: www.egyptiantheatre.events
- NRHP reference No.: 10000281
- Added to NRHP: May 24, 2010

The Egyptian Theatre is a historic movie theatre in Coos Bay, Oregon, United States.

== History ==
The Egyptian was built by Charles Noble, a descendant of one of the area's first settlers, in 1922. He spent $200,000 to convert the garage into the theater in 1925. The building was designed by Lee Arden Thomas and Albert Mercier and includes piers decorated with papyrus blossoms, wrought-iron ceiling lights in the form of hooded cobras, and stairways with 8-foot (2.4 m) pharaoh statues. The main theatre seats 770 and is an example of the Egyptian Theatre style of Egyptian Revival architecture that was popular in the early 20th century in the U.S., especially following the 1922 discovery of the tomb of King Tut. The theatre also has all of its original vaudeville backdrops. The theatre originally had one screen but the balcony was converted to house two screens in 1976, increasing the seating capacity to 1,000.

In 2000, the Egyptian housed the only theatre organ still in its original theatre in Oregon, a 4/18 Mighty Wurlitzer pipe organ. In 2010, it was one of four remaining theatres in the Egyptian Revival style in the United States and began inviting the community to use the facility for meetings, concerts, plays, and other events. The building was listed on the U.S. National Register of Historic Places on May 24, 2010. With unfunded $3 million renovations needed, the theatre was one of ten entries on the Historic Preservation League of Oregon's Most Endangered Places in Oregon list in 2011.

Structural issues were discovered in 2010, leading to its closure for "structural restoration and modernization", funded by the Egyptian Theater Preservation Association (EPTA) and the City of Coos Bay. The theater was reopened in June 2014 after the remodeling was successfully completed.

The theater celebrated its 100th anniversary on November 15, 2025. In January 2026, conservative nonprofit organization Turning Point USA, hosted speakers at the Egyptian for an event called “Coos County’s Turning Point”, as a part of their American Values Tour. The event drew protestors, who gathered at the Steve Prefontaine Murals to stand against "discrimination, separation, or divisiveness", said an organizer of the demonstration.

== See also ==
- Grauman's Egyptian Theatre
- Peery's Egyptian Theatre,
- Mary G. Steiner Egyptian Theatre
- The Egyptian Theatre (Boise, Idaho)
- Egyptian Theatre (DeKalb, Illinois)
- List of Oregon's Most Endangered Places
