= Egyptian Theatre, Park City =

Historic movie theater in Utah, US

Mary G. Steiner Egyptian Theatre
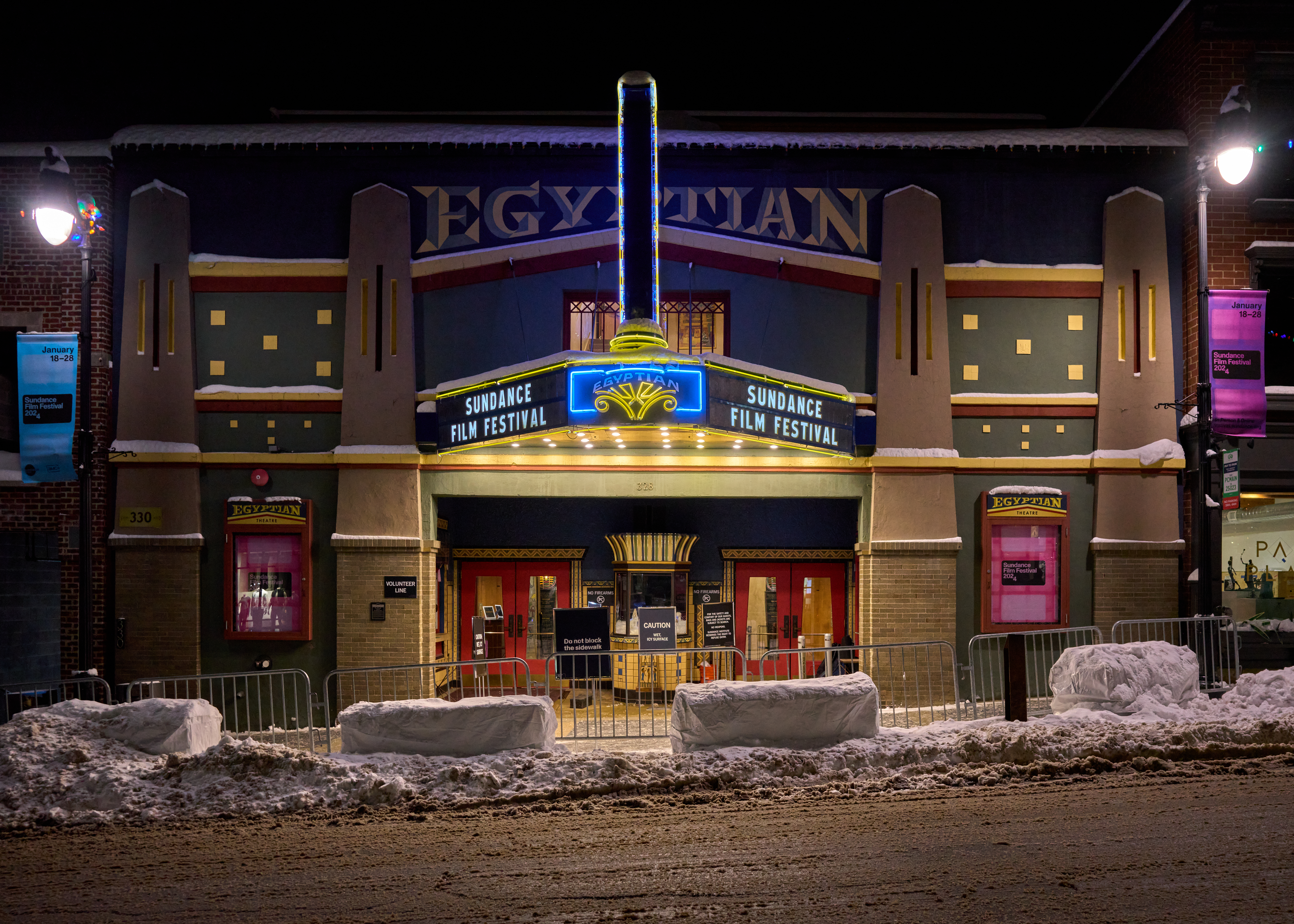
- The Egyptian Theatre on the eve of the 2024 Sundance Film Festival
- Interactive map of Mary G. Steiner Egyptian Theatre
- Address: 328 Main Street; Park City, Utah; U.S.
- Coordinates: 40.6425°N 111.495°W
- Capacity: 266

Construction
- Opened: December 25, 1926

Website
- parkcityshows.com

The Egyptian Theatre is located at 328 Main Street in Park City, Utah in the United States. It has also been referred to as the Mary J. Steiner Egyptian Theatre or Egyptian Theatre in Park City and is built in the style of Egyptian-themed theatres from the 1920s that followed the discovery of the tomb of Tutankhamun.

== History ==
The Egyptian Theatre was built on the location of the old Dewey Theatre, which collapsed under a snow load in January 1916. Construction began in 1926, and the first production, by John Alphonso Rugar (1883–1970), debuted on Christmas Day of 1926. It was built with a stage for potential vaudeville acts but was used primarily as a movie house. The design of the building was a replica of Warner's Egyptian Theatre in East Pasadena, California, and Egyptologist C.R. Berg of Seattle was consulted on the theater's theme and decor.

The Christmas opening featured a performance of "A Wonderful Sign of a Magical Time". The theatre was used as a saloon, a cinema house and live performance theatre during the Great Depression, the Second World War and a period of severe local emigration in the 1950s.

The theatre was eventually renamed the Silver Wheel Theatre in 1963, just in time for the town to rebound as a ski and resort city. Live theatre continued to be presented through this period, and in 1981, it became the home to Park City Performances after a renovation process. The increased diversity in productions helped the theatre carry on as an active venue well into the 1990s.

The Save our Stage community group was formed during this period, and on February 14, 1998, the Egyptian Theatre reopened after the completion of a major reconstruction and refurbishment effort. The cost of the renovation is estimated to be at $1.5 Million.

== Significance ==
The Egyptian Theatre was part of a national and worldwide fascination with the contemporary discovery of the tomb of King Tut in Egypt. Many cinema and performance theatres around the nation were either refurbished or constructed with the Egyptian theme in mind.

The design and construction of the theatre was supervised by an Egyptologist from Seattle, WA. The result of the accurate use of the historic details was a beautiful theatre with many of the most recognizable symbols of Egypt, including the lotus leaf, scarabs, hieroglyphics and symbols of life and happiness.

Originally the theatre was built to seat 400, but later renovations reduced that number to the present capacity of 310.

The Egyptian Theatre was the first sound movie cinema house in Park City, Utah.

The Sundance Film Festival has used The Egyptian Theatre as a cinematic house for almost as long as the festival has existed; one of its oldest and most recognizable venues.

This theatre is one of only two Egyptian-style theatres in Utah. The other example is that of Peery's Egyptian Theatre in Ogden, Utah. Besides these two theaters, the Salt Lake Masonic Temple is the only other Egyptian Revival building still extant in Utah.

== See also ==
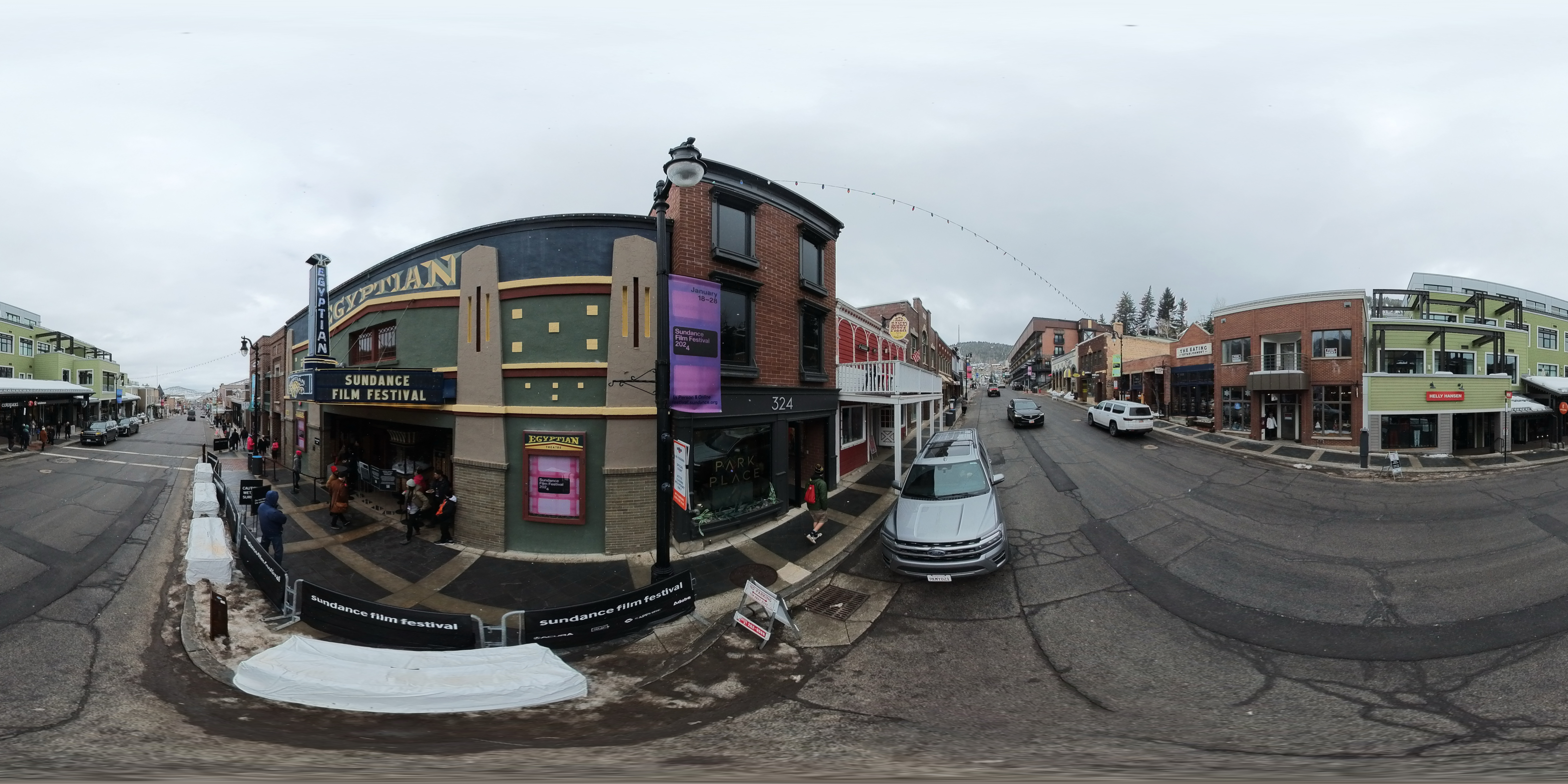
Mary G. Steiner Egyptian Theatre in Park City, Utah during the Sundance Film Festival 2024 (view as a 360° interactive panorama)

- Egyptian Theatre (Coos Bay, Oregon)
- Grauman's Egyptian Theatre
- The Egyptian Theatre (Boise, Idaho)
- Egyptian Theatre (DeKalb, Illinois)
