= Egyptian Theatre (DeKalb, Illinois) =

- U.S. National Register of Historic Places
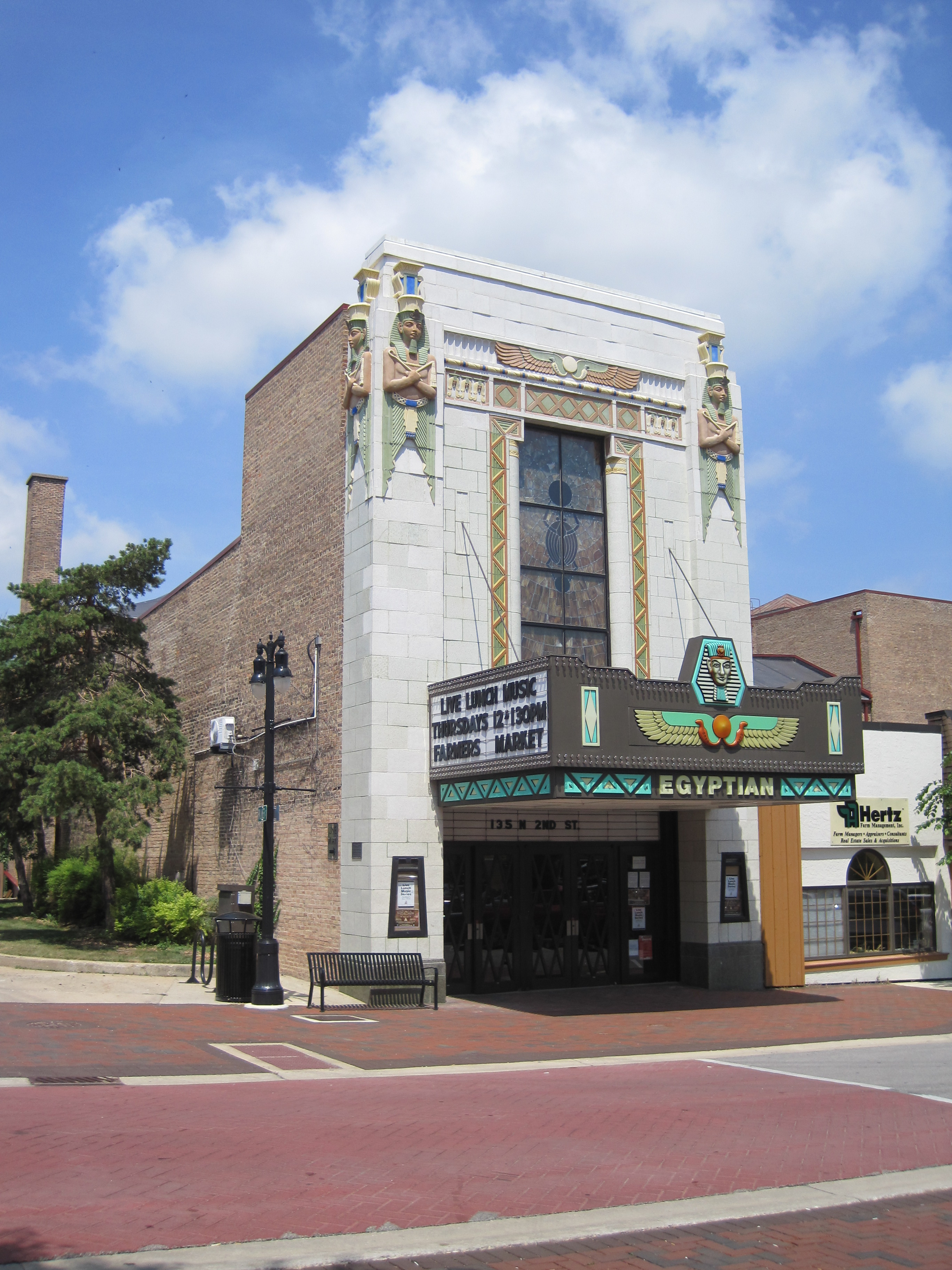
- The Egyptian Theatre in DeKalb, Illinois
- Location: DeKalb, DeKalb County, Illinois
- Coordinates: 41°55′52″N 88°45′11″W
- Built: 1928–29
- Architect: Elmer F. Behrns
- Architectural style: Egyptian Revival
- NRHP reference No.: 78003100
- Added to NRHP: December 1, 1978

The Egyptian Theatre in DeKalb, Illinois, United States, is an Egyptian Revival theatre that is listed on the U.S. National Register of Historic Places. The theatre was built in 1928 and 1929 as part of a much larger wave of national fascination with Ancient Egypt throughout the United States, due, in large part, to the discovery of Tutankhamun's tomb in 1922. The theatre was added to the National Register in 1978 and its 1,430-seat auditorium is currently DeKalb County's largest.

The building was designed by architect Elmer F. Behrns, who had an interest in Egyptology. The interior and exterior architecture reflect Egyptian cultural symbols. Stained glass work exhibits designs such as Ra, the Egyptian sun god and the scarab, a sacred Egyptian symbol. The building was nearly demolished in the 1970s but a restoration effort led by Preservation of the Egyptian Theatre (PET) saved the structure. Rumors have long surrounded the DeKalb Egyptian about secret messages allegedly hidden in the architecture and as well as ghost hauntings. While the theater maintains there are no hidden messages in the building the ghost stories have persisted throughout the years. The Egyptian Theatre operates year-round with up to 125 events annually.

== History ==
When the theatre opened in 1929 (97 years ago), it was one of many so-called Egyptian Theatres across the United States. Of those Egyptian theatres, the DeKalb theatre is one of a handful still standing as of 2019. In the original design, additional buildings were supposed to be attached to the existing building, but they were never built due to the stock market crash in late 1929. For instance, there was to be a hotel attached to the north side of the building. In its earliest days, the theatre specialized in silent films and live vaudevillian performances.

As decades passed, the theatre became more focused on film presentations and remained so throughout the 1940s, '50s and '60s. By the 1970s the theatre was in disrepair, and its plaster walls were crumbling. The owner handed the theatre over to the city of DeKalb. In 1978 a group of citizens banded together to restore and save the Egyptian. When the Egyptian was listed on the National Register of Historic Places in 1980, the group, Preservation of the Egyptian Theatre (PET), qualified for a $2.3 million grant from the state of Illinois. This money allowed the restoration of the theatre to begin. It was estimated at that time that $3.5 million was needed to completely restore the theatre. Due to the shortfall, there were many projects that had to be cut, including adding air conditioning which was finally added in 2020.

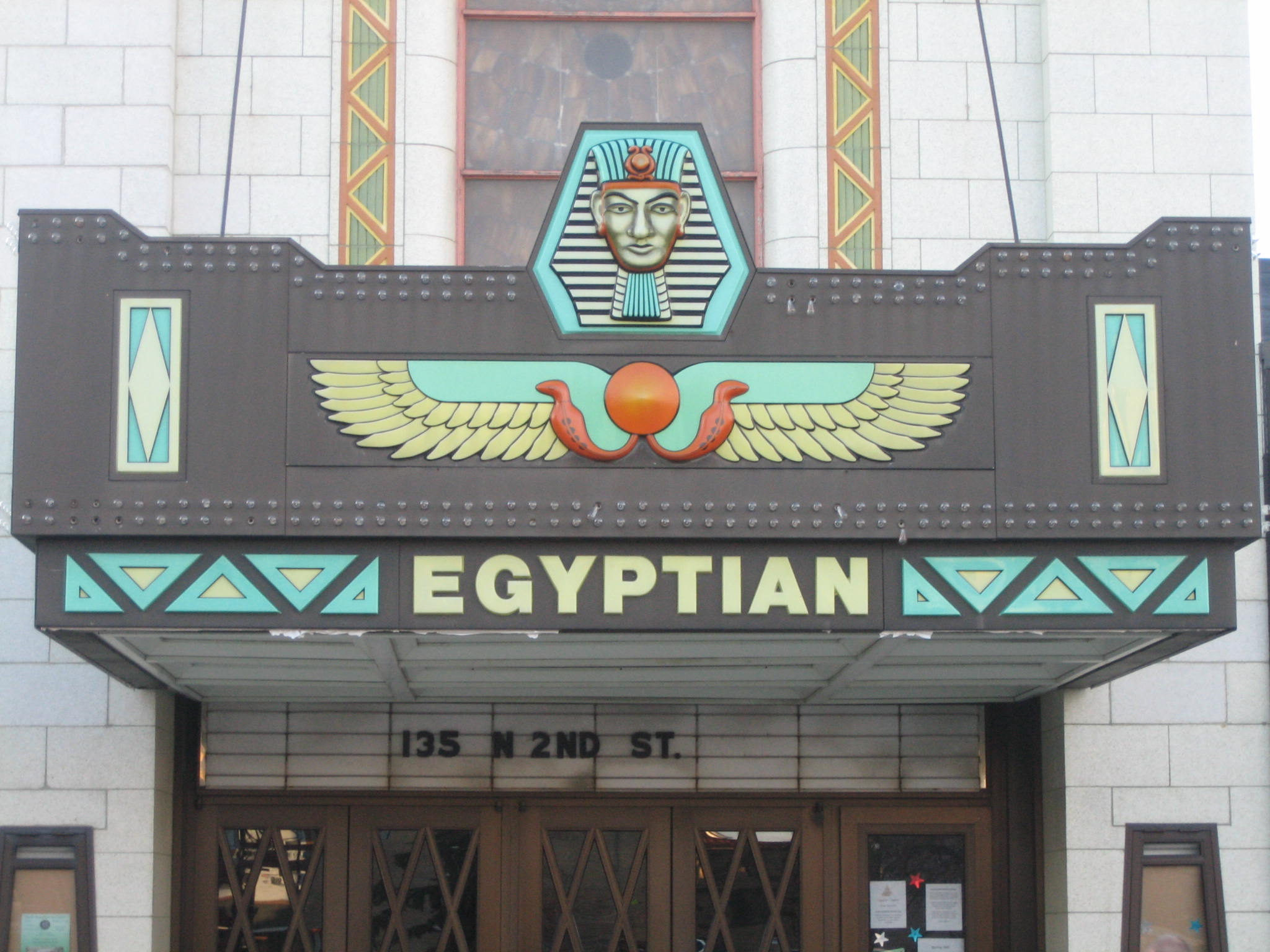
The current marquee is the fourth to adorn the building. It was installed in 1982.

As of 2007, the theatre is operated and staffed by PET. A non-profit organization, PET was formed in 1978 to save the theatre from destruction. Since the 1980s restoration the theatre has been host to a variety of films and events. The current marquee is the fourth to adorn the theatre; it was installed during the 1982 restoration.

The DeKalb Egyptian has a year-round season during which it features around 125 events annually. In 2006 more than thirty professional groups plus student organizations and university departments from nearby Northern Illinois University used the theatre.

Many notable performers have appeared at the Egyptian Theatre including Journey with Cheap Trick (from Rockford) (1977), Heart in '77, Violent Femmes (from Milwaukee) in '83, R.E.M. (1984), Chicago bluesman Willie Dixon (1985), Los Lobos (1994), Tori Amos (1994), Gaelic Storm (2003), Umphrey's McGee (from South Bend) (2008), UK's Frank Turner (2010), The Wonder Years (2011), Drake Bell (2011), Aaron Carter (2013), Rick Springfield (2013), Chicago band Survivor (2013) comedian Lewis Black (2015), Chicago's Richard Marx (2015), Chicago's The Buckinghams (2015), Chicago's Plain White T's (2018), UK classic rock band Sweet (2018), Scotty McCreery (2019), Arlo Guthrie (2019), The Second City Touring Company (2019), The Turtles with Classics IV and other 60s bands (2021), Jesse McCartney (2021), Jeff Tweedy of Wilco (from Chicago) (2022), and Mavis Staples (from Chicago) (2023). The Egyptian hosts Gaelic Storm each year and several tribute bands.

In January 2019 Executive Director Alex Nerad announced that the theater would undergo a $5.5 million renovation, including adding air-conditioning to protect the historical integrity of the building and alterations to meet the standards set by the Americans with Disabilities Act.

== Architecture ==
Although the DeKalb Egyptian Theatre is one of up to one hundred Egyptian-style theatres built during the early 20th century, it is believed to be one of only six remaining in the United States. This particular theatre is more than a simple hodgepodge of hieroglyphics and Egyptian symbols. The architect, Elmer F. Behrns, himself interested in Egyptology, designed the Egyptian Theatre in DeKalb to have one central theme. Behrns' motif for the DeKalb Egyptian was that of Pharaoh Ramses II.

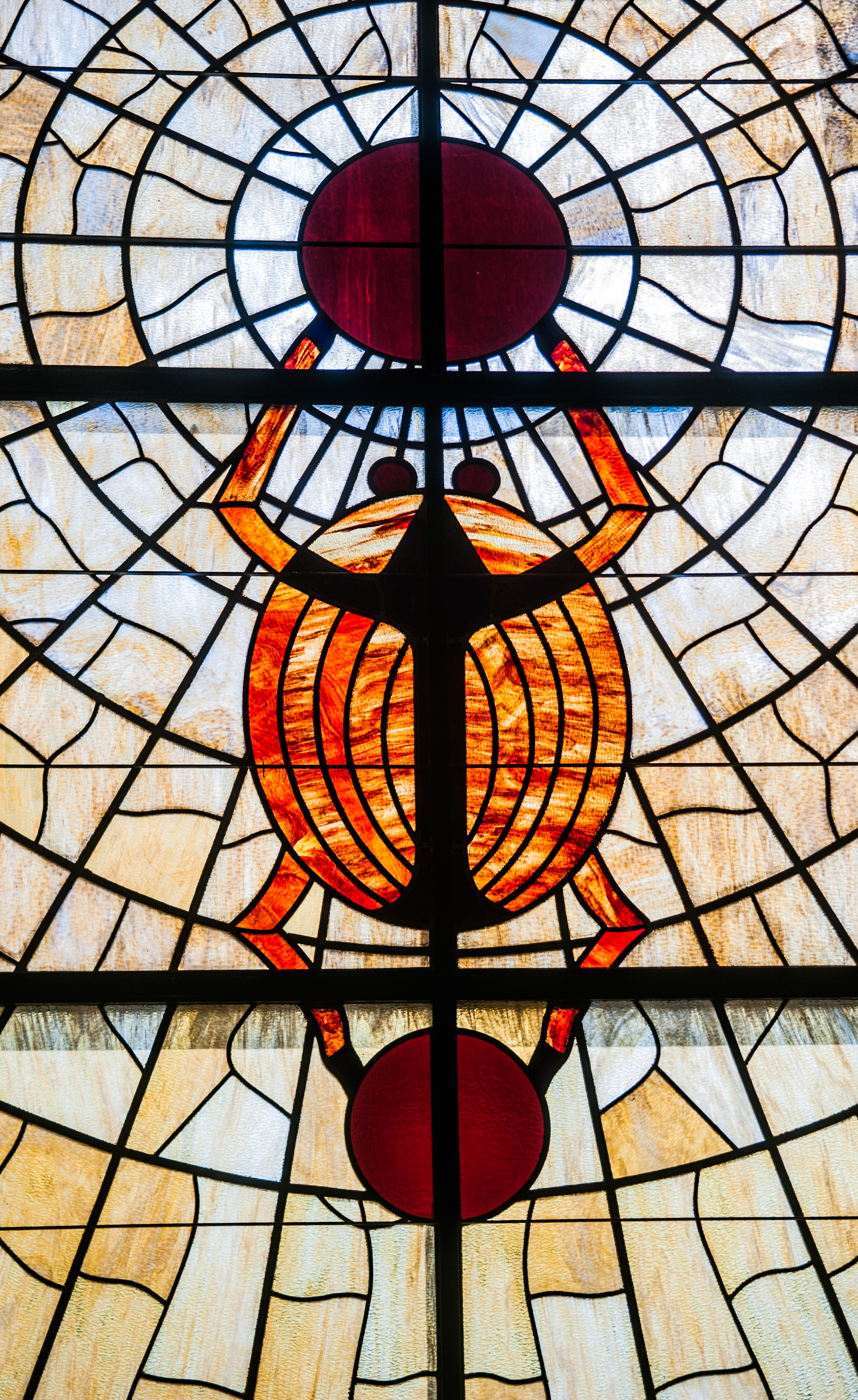
The scarab is a prominent Egyptian symbol in the stained glass work on the front facade of the theatre.

The exterior facade is covered in a light sage terra cotta and exhibits a 20-foot (6.1 m) tall stained glass window, which bears the ancient scarab symbol. The scarab is holding up the sun god Ra whilst standing on top of the Earth. To each side of the stained glass window, the building's facade holds two huge pharaohs, meant to "guard" over the theatre entrance. The entirety of the theatre's front facade is designed to resemble the gate of a great temple.

The small outer lobby is meant to evoke feelings of entering the outer chamber of an ancient Egyptian tomb. The walls of the outer lobby are built from huge unadorned blocks with a faux sandstone surface. The front of the ticket box office is decorated in a dusky sienna red with a golden sunburst emblazoned above the window. Past the outer lobby of the DeKalb Egyptian Theatre, through the glass doors and into the main lobby, the original mosaic-tiled floor and the towering 40 foot (12.2 m) ceiling are both revealed.

The walls of the main lobby are cream-colored plaster, surrounded by eight pillars and cornices adorned with golden lotus blossoms and palm leaves. High up the walls, between each of the pillars, are six large golden plaster urns. The urns are decorated with lotus blossom buds and palm leaves as well. They are crowned by a gilded design incorporating outstretched falcon wings and the disc of the sun entwined with golden serpents. The lotus motif is repeated on the frosted wall sconces below the urns and on the chandelier hanging over the center of the double staircase; the staircase, at the end of the main lobby, leads to the mezzanine and balcony.

The decoration and layout of the auditorium is meant to resemble a royal Egyptian courtyard. While the stage is a decent size, at 35 feet (10.7 m) across, the backstage space is very small because of its original use as a vaudeville theatre. When the theatre first opened, it had seating for 1,600 guests, but as a result of the 1980s renovation that dropped to 1,483 seats. Four more seats were removed in late 2000 to comply with disability laws. The 1,430-seat auditorium is DeKalb County's largest.

== Hauntings ==
The DeKalb Egyptian, like many other Egyptian Revival structures, is meant to create an air of mystery. The imagery of the ancient Egyptian symbols has fostered the popular belief that there is a hidden meaning behind the architecture and color scheme in and on the DeKalb Egyptian. The theatre said through a spokesman in 2006 that both the colors and the decorations were picked for their beauty and no other reason.

While there are no hidden messages in the architecture, there have been numerous occurrences and reports of alleged ghostly phenomena. The Egyptian has been widely rumored to be the home of two ghosts. One is said to be that of Irv Kummerfeldt, co-founder of PET; Kummerfeldt had a heart attack and died at the top of "Aisle One" in the Egyptian Theatre's auditorium. His ghost has been reported in that area of the theatre ever since. The second ghost, "Bob," as theatre workers and preservationists have dubbed it, is much more free roaming. Bob has been seen throughout the building; objects have moved on their own, doors have opened on their own, and people have felt a tap on their shoulder when no one else is around. Occasionally, footsteps have been heard echoing across the auditorium. The theatre operators and preservationists lend enough credence to the ghost sightings and stories to keep an eye out for any information in old newspapers on who the ghost might have been.

== Significance ==
The theatre is one of the few remaining Egyptian theatres in the United States. Depending on which estimates are utilized there are six or more Egyptian Revival theatres remaining in the United States. The Illinois Main Street association called the DeKalb Egyptian "one of Illinois' great buildings." The Egyptian Theatre was added to the U.S. National Register of Historic Places on December 1, 1978.

== See also ==
- Egyptian Theatre (Coos Bay, Oregon)
- Grauman's Egyptian Theatre – Hollywood, California
- Peery's Egyptian Theatre – Ogden, Utah
- Mary G. Steiner Egyptian Theatre – Park City, Utah
- The Egyptian Theatre (Boise, Idaho)
