= J. C. Braly House =

Historic building in Portland, Oregon, U.S.

- U.S. National Register of Historic Places
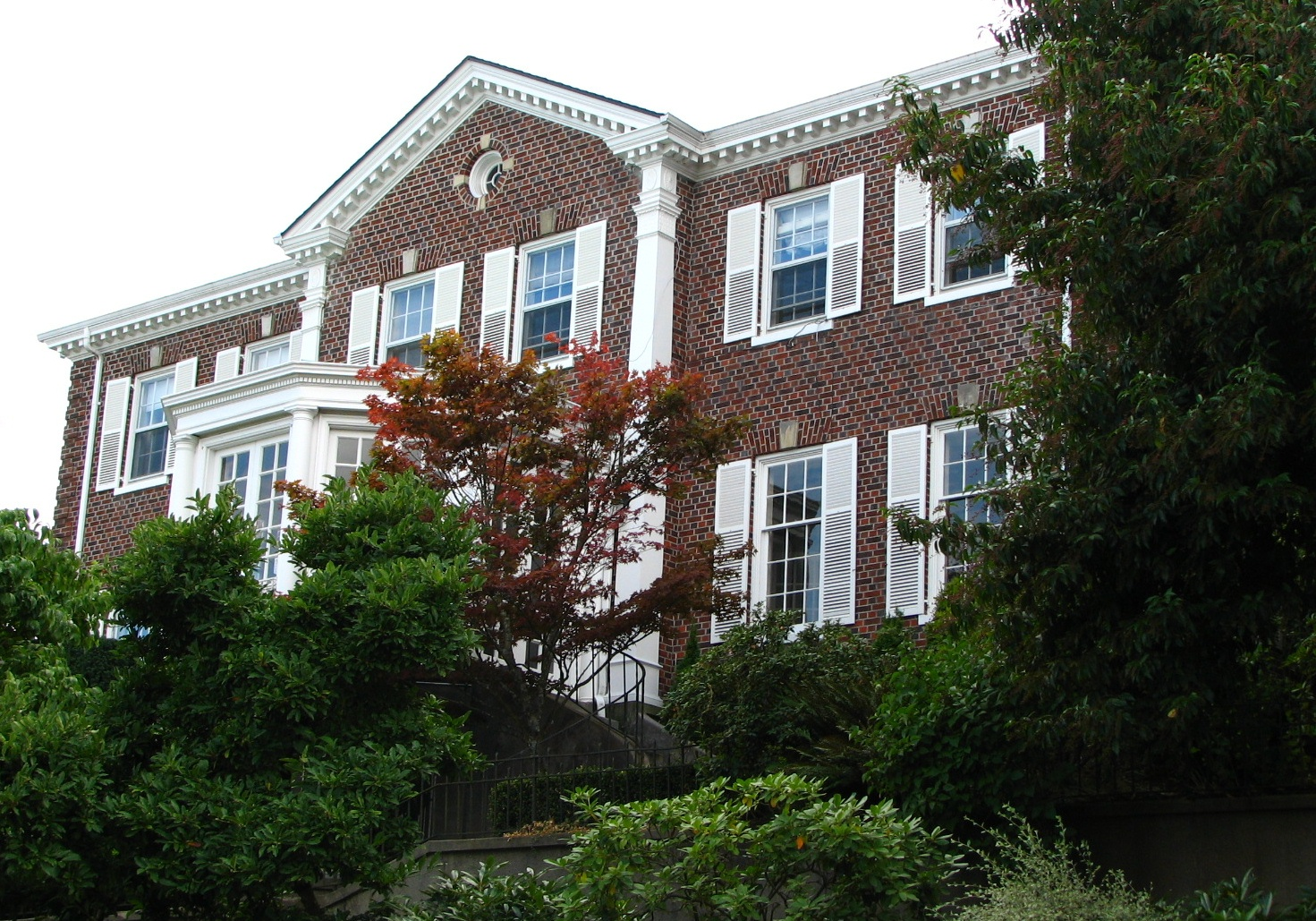
- The house in 2008
- Location: 2846 NW Fairfax Terrace; Portland, Oregon, United States, 97210
- Built: 1926
- Architect: Lee Arden Thomas & Albert T. Mercier
- Architectural style: Colonial Revival
- NRHP reference No.: 91000132
- Added to NRHP: February 28, 1991

The J. C. Braly House is a National Register of Historic Places-listed Colonial Revival-style house located in northwest Portland, Oregon. The architect for the home was Lee Arden Thomas who designed a number of other notable structures in Oregon.

== History ==
The Braly family originated with James C. Braly and Mary E. Whistburn Braly, who were natives of Missouri. They first settled in McMinnville, Oregon, then moved to San Diego, California in 1886. The Bralys had six children: sons Clark, Addison, John Claude, and James, Jr., and daughters Carrie Lee and Margaret Grace. James C. Braly died on July 29, 1902. It appears the senior J. C. Braly either served in or ran for the Oregon State Legislature in 1876. J. C. Braly, Jr., moved to Portland in 1911 and became a successful businessman. The house itself was built for the junior Braly in 1926 and added to the National Register of Historic Places in 1991.

== See also ==
- National Register of Historic Places listings in Multnomah County, Oregon
- National Register of Historic Places listings in Northwest Portland, Oregon
- National Register of Historic Places listings in Oregon
