= Old Bend High School =

- Bend High School
- U.S. National Register of Historic Places
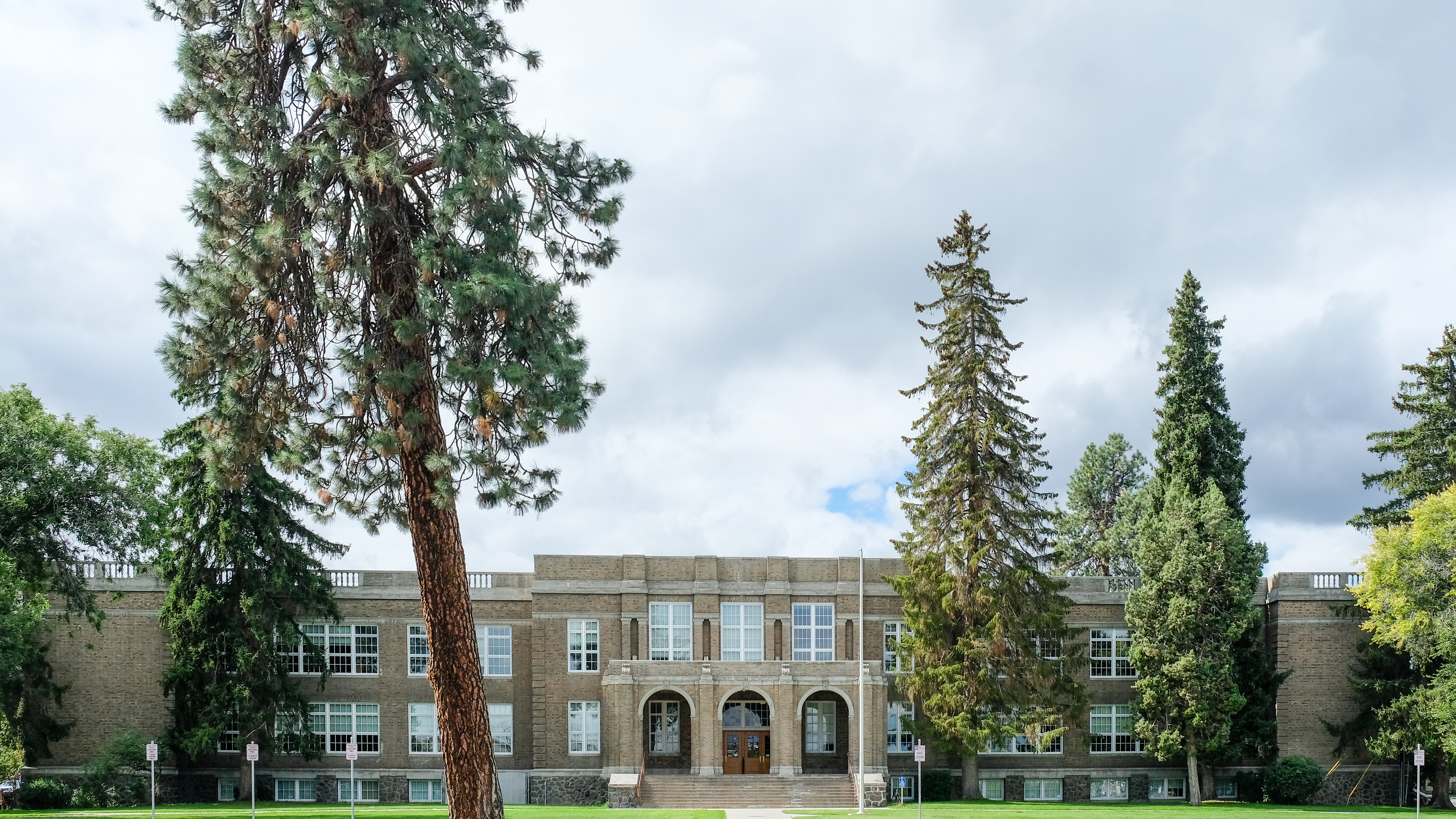
- Exterior of Bend High School

- Location within Oregon Location within the United States
- Location: Bend, Oregon, United States
- Coordinates: 44.05626°N 121.31612°W
- Built: 1924
- Architect: Hugh A. Thompson
- Architectural style: Beaux Arts
- NRHP reference No.: 93000916
- Added to NRHP: 1993

The Old Bend High School is a historic school building in Bend, Oregon, in the United States. Opened in 1925, the building served as a public high school for 31 years and a junior high school for an additional 22 years before being transitioned in 1979 into its current role as the administrative headquarters for the Bend-La Pine School District.

Because of its unique architecture and history, the Old Bend High School is listed on the National Register of Historic Places.

== History ==
Bend's first schoolhouse was opened in 1887. It was located in an abandoned cabin near the Deschutes River in what is now Drake Park. That schoolhouse was replaced in 1904 by a three-story wood-frame school building located at the north end of Bend's downtown area, near where the Deschutes County Court House is located today. The first high school curriculum was developed that same year, by Ruth Reid, who was the Bend School District's first principal.

In 1913, the people of Bend passed a school bond issue that provided $23,000 for the purchase of property and the construction of a modern public school. The result was the three-story Reid School finished in 1914. The new school accommodated 241 students from first grade through high school. Because the Great Northern and Union Pacific railroads had opened routes into Central Oregon in 1911, the community was growing rapidly. As a result, 42 of the 241 children who attended the Reid School in 1914 were new students.

In 1917, a new eight-room brick high school was built in downtown Bend. In its first year, the high school enrollment was 115 students. As the number of students continued to grow, the classrooms became overcrowded. By 1920, the high school had overflowed into sixteen temporary classrooms located in several downtown buildings including two cellars.

In 1923, the Bend school board established a building committee to develop plans for a new high school. Based on recommendations from the building committee, the school board accept the Bend Amateur Athletic Club building (also listed on the National Register of Historic Places) from the Bend Holding Company to use as the high school gymnasium. In January 1924, a new unified high school district was approved by Bend voters. A month later, voters in the unified school district approved a $209,000 bond issue for the construction of a new high school building adjacent to the Bend Amateur Athletic Club facility. Construction began in the fall of 1924, and was finished in time to open on 7 September 1925. There were 69 seniors in the school's first graduating class in May 1926.

By 1952, the enrollment was approaching 1,000. However, the building continued to house Bend's high school until 1956 when a new high school was opened. A year later, the old high school building became Cascade Junior High. It served as a junior high school for 22 years. In 1979, the junior high students moved to a new building, and the old facility was converted into administrative offices for the Bend-La Pine School District. Since 1979, the old Bend High School building has housed school district offices plus several kindergarten classrooms.

Because of the school's unique architecture and its importance to the history of Bend, the Bend High School building was listed on the National Register of Historic Places in 1993. Today, a historic marker near the building's main entrance reminds visitor of the school's heritage.

== Structure ==
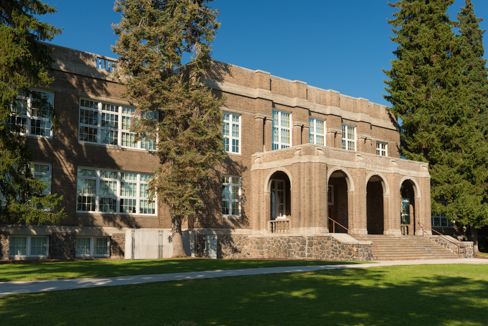
Another view of the outside of the building.

The old Bend High School is a neoclassical Beaux Arts style building designed by Hugh A. Thompson, Bend's first resident architect. Ed Brosterhous was the general contractor who supervised the school's construction. It was built at the south end of a 3.17-acre (12,800 m^{2}) parcel in downtown Bend. The site is bordered by Wall Street on the northwest, Louisiana Avenue on the northeast, Bond Street on the southeast, and the Bend Amateur Athletic Club property on the southwest. The main entrance faces Louisiana Avenue, with concrete walkways leading across the front lawn to the school's main entrance. There are a number of large Ponderosa pine trees that shade the grounds. Play ground equipment for the children attending kindergarten in the building, give the area a park-like atmosphere.

The old high school is a two-story structure with a high basement. The building has a U-shaped footprint measuring 120 feet (37 m) by 247 feet (75 m). The walls are brick, built over a foundation course of stone masonry above a concrete basement. The front facade is well balanced with high windows from end to end and a wide stairway leading to the main portico entrance on the first floor. The main entrance is dominated by three round-head archways supported by wide brick columns resting on a cut stone foundation. The main wall of the building behind the portico is embellished with sculptured cut-stone and Doric-style stone caps.

The building has four other entrances, one on the east and west sides and two on the building's south side. The east and west sides match the building's front façade with brick parapet walls and two stories of high windows plus a row of smaller window along the foundation to allow light into the basement rooms. The back side of the building has much less stone work and very little architectural decoration. However, the high windows continue around the entire building.
