= B. A. and Ruth Stover House =

Historic house in Oregon, United States

- U.S. National Register of Historic Places
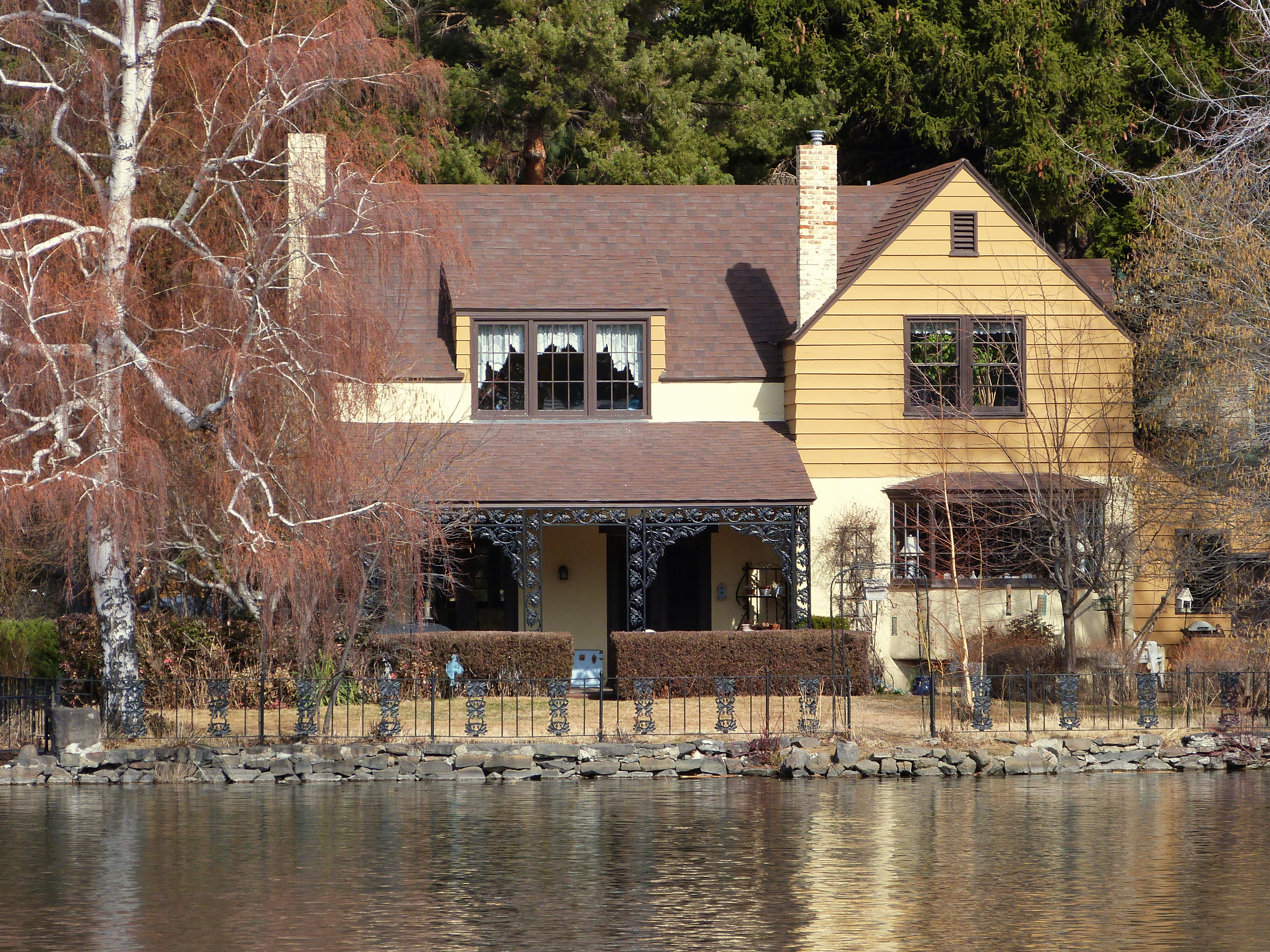

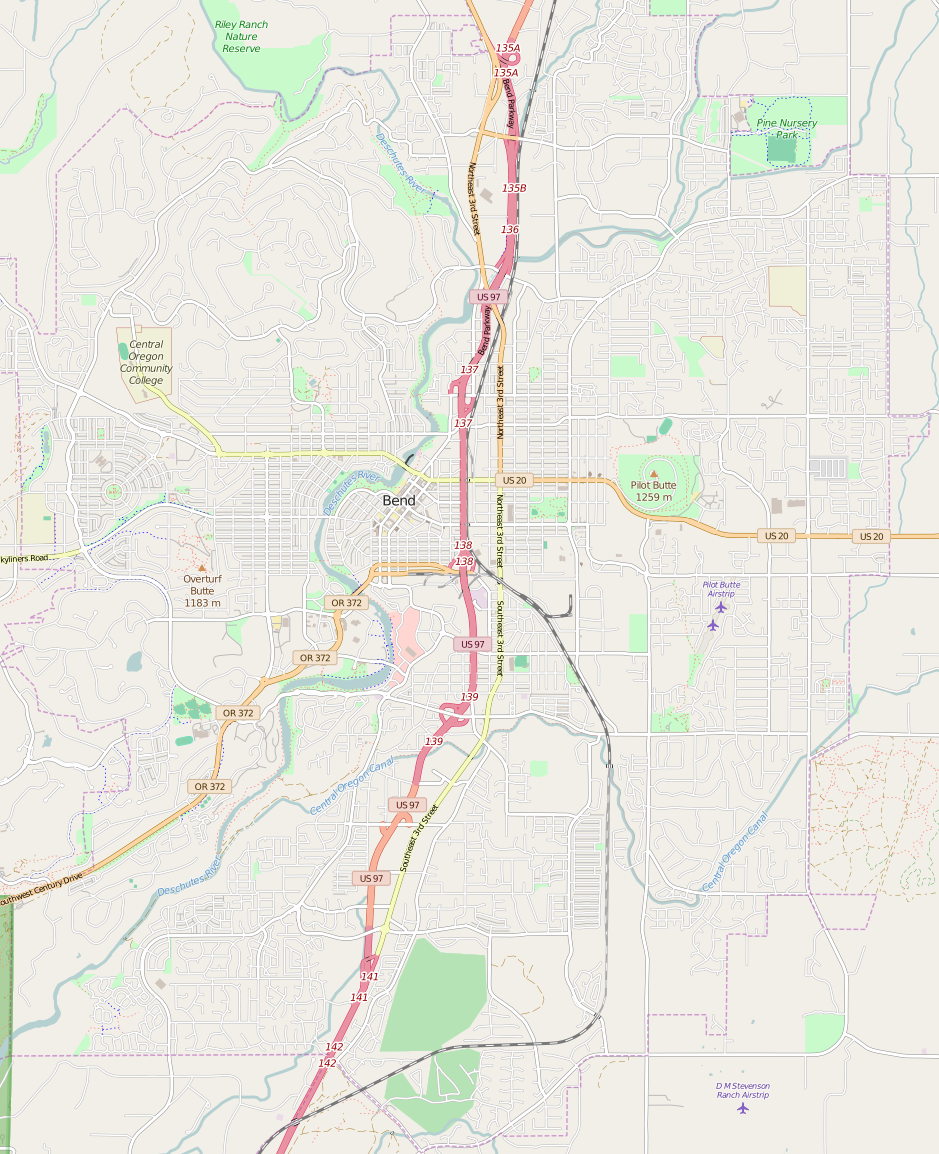
- Location within Bend OR Location within Oregon
- Location: 1 NW Rocklyn Road; Bend, Oregon
- Coordinates: 44°3′40″N 121°19′3″W
- Area: 0.2 acres (0.081 ha)
- Built: 1927
- Architect: Hugh Thompson, Henry Nelson
- Architectural style: Tudor Revival, English Cottage
- NRHP reference No.: 92000061
- Added to NRHP: February 20, 1992

The B. A. and Ruth Stover House is a historic 1927 residence in Bend, Oregon, United States. It was listed on the National Register of Historic Places in 1992 by its current and third owners, Norman and Holly Remer.

Located at 1 NW Rocklyn Road, the two-story, gabled English Cottage style house was built on a former Indian campground at the northern littoral of Mirror Pond. The pond was created in 1909 when the Deschutes River was dammed for hydroelectric power. The house was designed by Hugh Thompson and the contractor was Henry Nelson (1890–1984). Thompson was a friend of the Stovers, and also designed the Capitol Theater (1922) on Wall Street that Stover purchased from Dennis Carmody.

== Background ==
Stover worked at the Bend Company mill and was a bank teller at Independent First National Bank. He served in World War I including at Château-Thierry in France, and was a theater owner and clothing retailer. Known as a youth booster, he organized the first annual Bend Water Pageant and was elected a State Representative, serving in the 1951-195 legislature under governors Douglas McKay and Paul Patterson. He was a member of numerous organizations. Bend's Stover Park is named after him.

Stover's wife, Ruth Cushing, was born in Spokane, Washington to pioneer parents. She was the first four-year graduate to receive a diploma at Portland's Jefferson High School in 1913, attended Eastern Washington Normal School in Cheney, and taught in Riparia, Washington and Salem, Oregon.
