= Bend Amateur Athletic Club Gymnasium =

- U.S. National Register of Historic Places
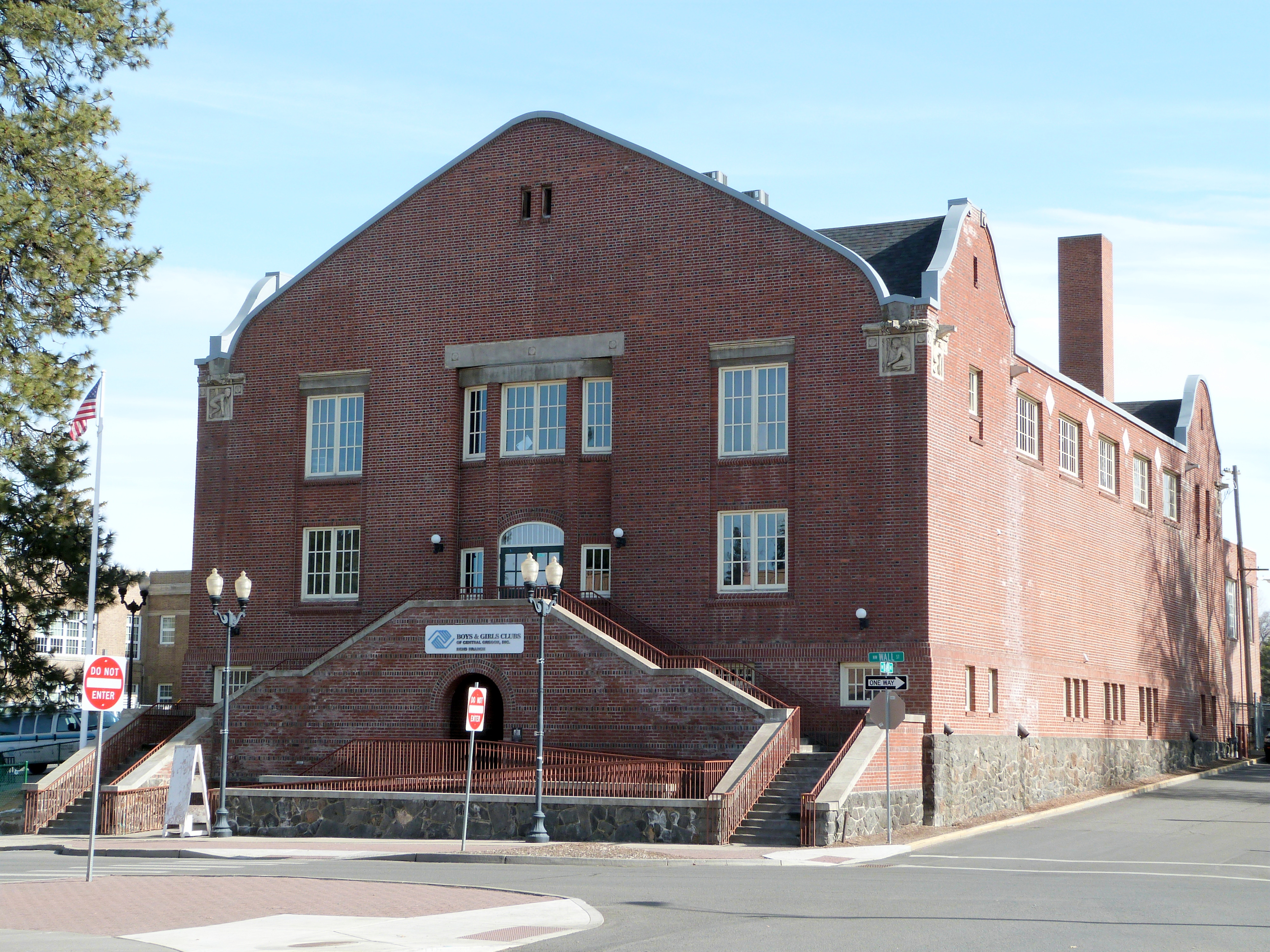

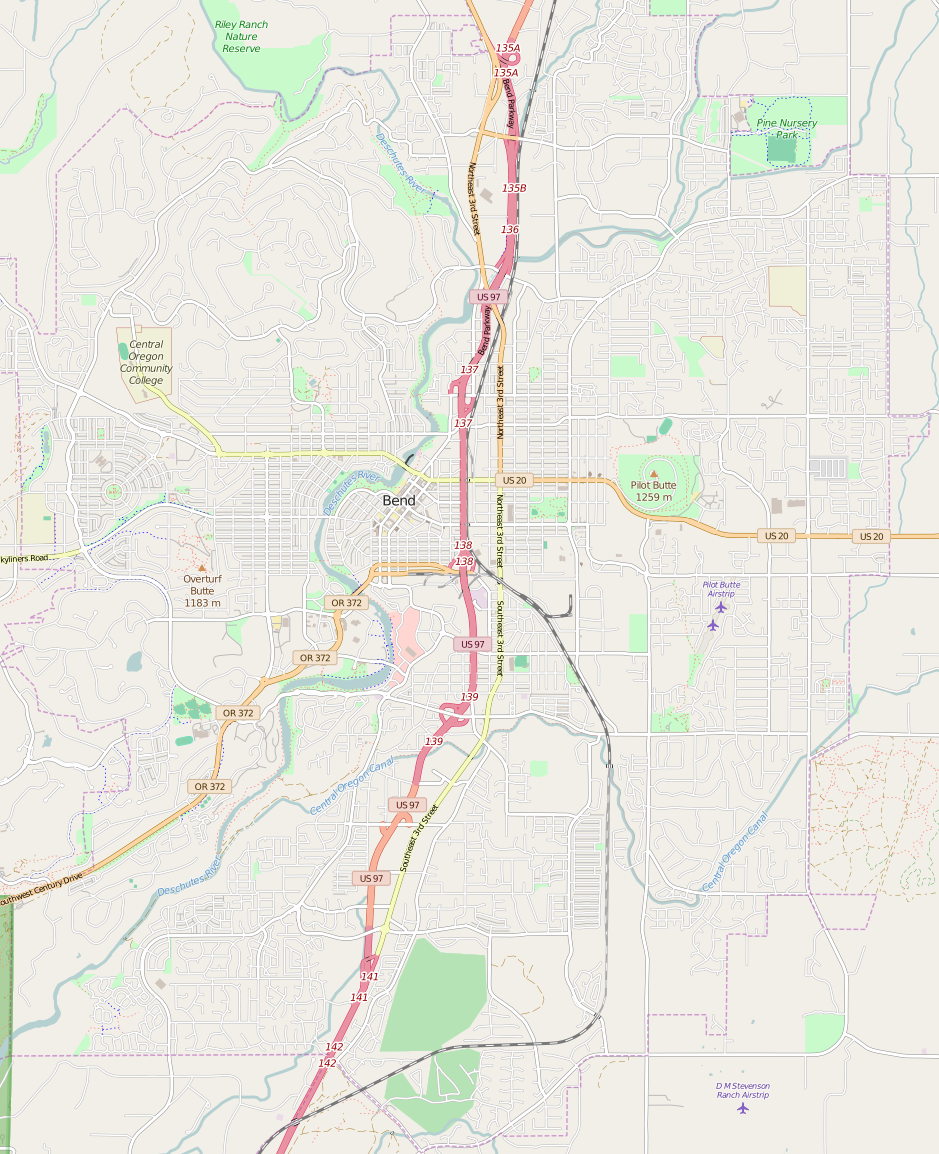
- Location within Bend OR Location within Oregon Location within the United States
- Location: 547 Wall Street, Bend, Oregon
- Coordinates: 44°3′23″N 121°18′54″W
- Built: 1917
- Architect: Lee Arden Thomas
- Architectural style: Colonial, Jacobean
- MPS: Historic Development of the Bend Company in Bend, Oregon MPS
- NRHP reference No.: 83004165
- Added to NRHP: November 25, 1983

The Bend Amateur Athletic Club Gymnasium is a historic building in Bend, Oregon, United States. It was added to the National Register of Historic Places (NRHP) in 1983. The building was designed by Lee Arden Thomas and built by Guy H. Wilson.

When the Bend School Board established a building committee to develop plans for a new high school in 1923, they followed recommendations from the building committee and accepted the Bend Amateur Athletic Club building from the Bend Holding Company to use as the high school's gymnasium. The school would become Old Bend High School (also listed on the NRHP).
