= Egyptian Theatre (Delta, Colorado) =

- Egyptian Theater
- U.S. National Register of Historic Places
- Colorado State Register of Historic Properties
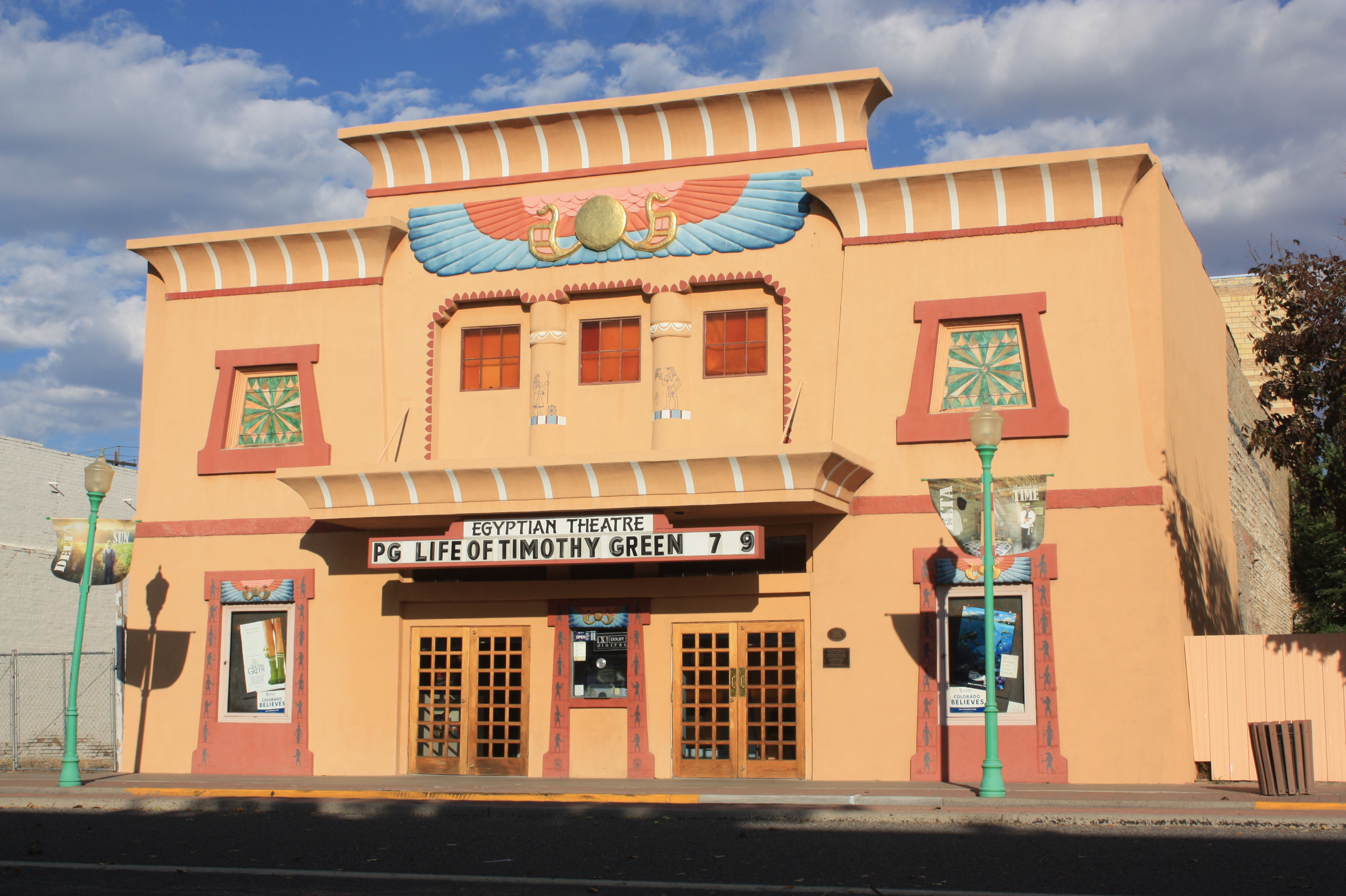

- Location within Colorado Location within the United States
- Location: 452 Main St., Delta, Colorado
- Coordinates: 38°44′27″N 108°4′11″W
- Built: 1928
- Architects: M.S. Fallis Architect Co.; Art M. Moore
- Architectural style: Late 19th and 20th Century Revivals, Egyptian Revival
- Website: www.deltaegyptian.org
- NRHP reference No.: 93000575
- CSRHP No.: 5DT.431
- Added to NRHP: July 12, 1993

The Egyptian Theatre in Delta, Colorado, United States, is an Egyptian Revival movie house. The 425-seat theater opened in 1928 at the height of the fashion for thematically-designed cinemas. It was designed by Montana Fallis, who also designed the Mayan Theatre in Denver. The Egyptian is notable as one of the first locations for a promotion devised by 20th Century Fox regional manager Charles Yeager, during the 1930s when business was poor in the small Colorado theaters he managed. "Bank Night" awarded $30 to a random patron once a week. The promotion improved attendance and kept theaters in business. Yeager's pilot program in Colorado was expanded so that by 1936 the promotion was in use at 4,000 cinemas in the United States.

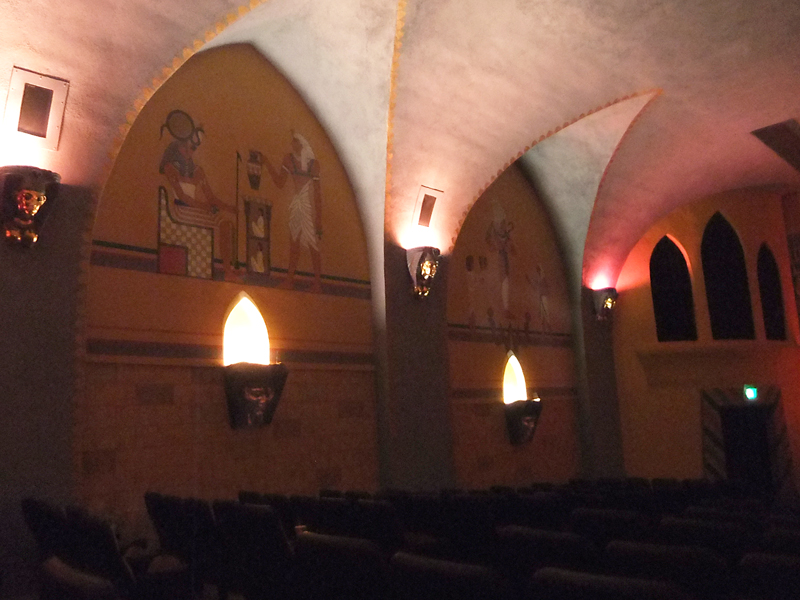
Interior wall detail of the historic Egyptian Theatre in Delta, CO

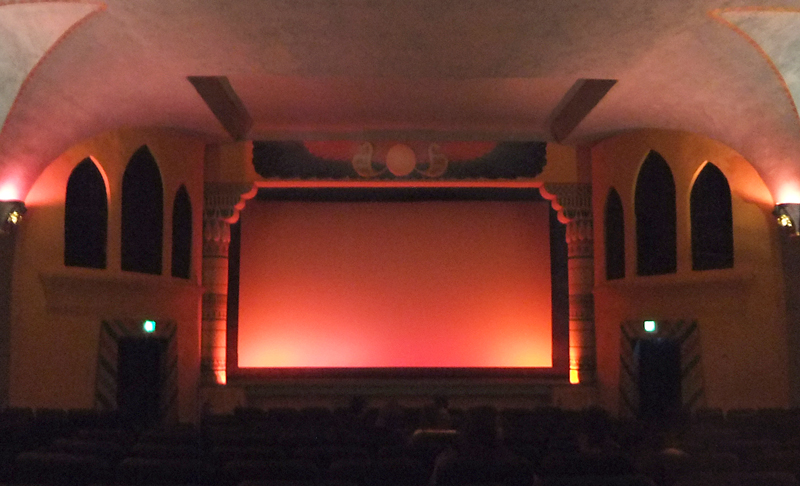
View towards the screen inside the historic Egyptian Theatre.

After years of decline and neglect the theater was restored in the 1990s, reopening in 1997 as a community theater. It was then renovated again in 2009 to accommodate new groundbreaking 3D technology.

It came under new, nonprofit ownership in 2022.

== In film ==
In September 2023, the film CineMortal was shot at the Delta Egyptian Theatre. The film is a comedy horror about a group of former film students who have a late-night viewing party at the Egyptian Theatre. They find an old film in the basement and decide to watch it with horrifying results. CineMortal premiered at the Delta Egyptian on November 7, 2025, with all proceeds going to the theater.

== See also ==
- Egyptian Theatre for other Egyptian Theatres and a discussion of the style
