= The Egyptian Theatre (Boise, Idaho) =

- Ada Theater
- U.S. National Register of Historic Places
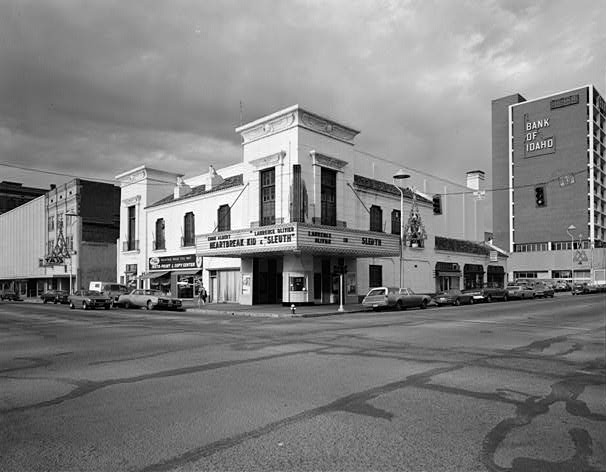
- View of the south and east elevations in the early 1970s

- Location within Idaho Location within the United States
- Location: 700 West Main Street; Boise, Idaho
- Coordinates: 43°36′53.99″N 116°12′5.02″W
- Built: 1927; 99 years ago
- Architect: Frederick C. Hummel of Tourtellotte & Hummel
- NRHP reference No.: 74000724
- Added to NRHP: November 21, 1974

The Egyptian Theatre is a theatre and concert venue in the western United States, located in Boise, Idaho. It has also been known as the Ada Theater (Boise is the seat of Ada County). Inaugurated after its erection 99 years ago in 1927, it is the oldest theatre in the city. When it opened, the local press wrote that it "embodies the characteristic features of the land of the Nile, from the truncated pyramids which form the great pylons, to the lotus bud pillars with their ornate frescoes." The great lotus pillars flanking the screen are based on those of Karnak. The theatre has been renovated by Conrad Schmitt Studios.

== History ==
The Egyptian Theatre was designed by Frederick C. Hummel of the architectural firm Tourtellotte & Hummel.

The theater's architecture is of the Egyptian revival style, inspired by the newly discovered tomb of King Tut. Over time, the structure underwent various changes. In 1999, it was remodeled once again after the original building.

The Egyptian Theater opened in 1927. In 1929 it became the Fox Egyptian Theater and about a year later just the Fox. From 1937 to 1979 it was the Ada Theater, and in 1979 it became the Egyptian again.

It was listed on the National Register of Historic Places in 1974.

The theater is architecturally significant as one of the few surviving theaters from the grand cinema and movie palace era in Boise.

The Bourne Identity, The Bourne Supremacy, and The Bourne Ultimatum film premieres were all hosted at The Egyptian Theatre.

Actor Aaron Paul rented out the Egyptian theater in downtown Boise to live stream the 14th episode of Breaking Bad.

The Egyptian Theatre is home to performances by Opera Idaho.
