= Virginia State Route 57 =

State highway in southern Virginia, US

State Route 57

- Route of SR 57 in red; route of SR 57 Alt. highlighted in blue

Route information
- Maintained by VDOT
- Length: 88.70 mi (142.75 km)
- Existed: 1930–present

Major junctions
- West end: SR 8 near Woolwine
- US 220 in Stanleytown; US 58 Bus. / US 220 Bus. in Martinsville; US 29 in Chatham
- East end: SR 360 near Halifax

Location
- Country: United States
- State: Virginia
- Counties: Patrick, Henry, City of Martinsville, Pittsylvania, Halifax

Highway system
- Virginia Routes; Interstate; US; Primary; Secondary; Byways; History; HOT lanes
← SR 56	→ US 58

State Route 57 (SR 57) is a primary state highway in the U.S. state of Virginia. The state highway runs 88.70 miles (142.75 km) from SR 8 near Woolwine east to SR 360 near Halifax. SR 57 connects the independent city of Martinsville with Chatham and Halifax, the county seats of Pittsylvania and Halifax counties, respectively. The state highway also connects the city to Fairy Stone State Park.

== Route description ==
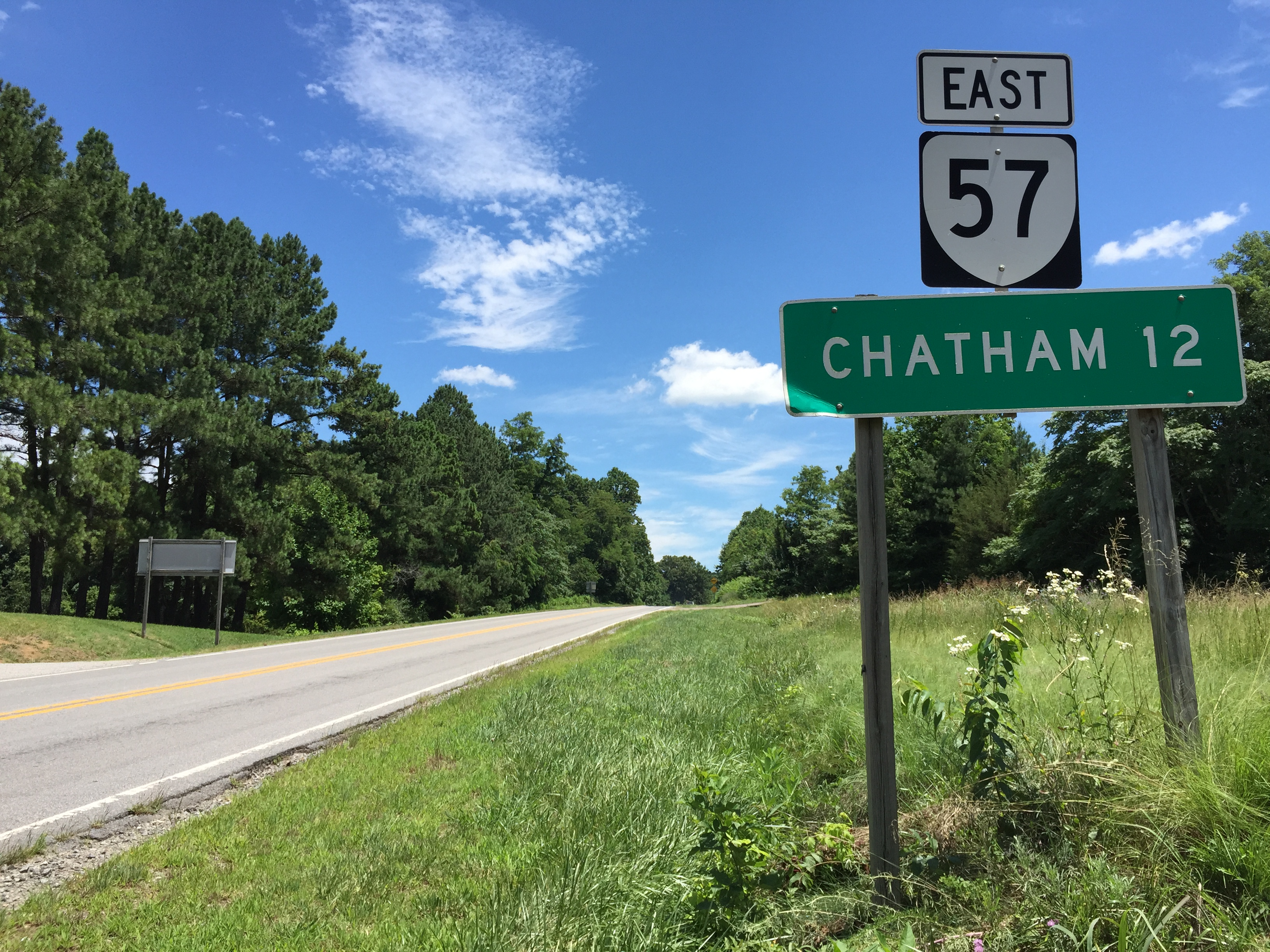
View east along SR 57 at SR 41 in Callands

SR 57 begins at an intersection with SR 8 (Woolwine Highway), which heads south toward the Patrick County seat of Stuart and north toward Woolwine. SR 57 heads northeast through a mountainous area of Patrick County just east of the Blue Ridge Mountains as Fairystone Park Highway. The state highway curves southeast at its junction with SR 346 (Fairystone Lake Drive), which is the main entrance to Fairy Stone State Park. SR 57 passes through the park property before entering Henry County. The state highway begins to parallel the Smith River shortly before meeting the western end of SR 57 Alternate (Riverside Drive), where the mainline highway crosses to the north side of the river and parallels Norfolk Southern Railway's Winston-Salem District through the community of Bassett, within which the highway has a tight S-curve to cross to the north side of the tracks.

SR 57 veers away from the railroad and expands to a four-lane divided highway through Stanleytown to a cloverleaf interchange with U.S. Route 220 (US 220, William F. Stone Highway). The roadway continues east as US 220 Business (Virginia Avenue). SR 57 joins US 220 south for a short concurrency before splitting from US 220 at a partial interchange that only allows access to SR 57's new road, two-lane Appalachian Drive, from the north. SR 57 parallels the Smith River and the rail line again past Fieldale, where the highway crosses to the south side of the track. Just after passing the WHEE radio tower, the state highway enters the city of Martinsville, its name changes to Fayette Street, and the road curves northeast under the railroad track toward downtown. SR 57 heads toward a five-way intersection where the highway intersects US 220 Business (Memorial Boulevard) and SR 457, which follows two-way Church Street eastbound and two-way Fayette Street westbound through the area west of downtown Martinsville.

SR 57 turns south onto US 220 Business, a five-lane road with center turn lane that passes under the rail line again. At Starling Avenue, US 220 Business continues south along Memorial Drive with US 58 Business while US 58's business route joins SR 57 on two-lane Starling Avenue. SR 57 and US 58 Business pass the Virginia Museum of Natural History before turning east onto Church Street, which veers northeast, expands to a four-lane road, and crosses over the Dick & Willie Passage Rail Trail. At Chatham Heights Road, the two highways head east as a four-lane divided highway whose name changes to A.L. Philpott Highway when it leaves the city of Martinsville. A short distance east of the city limits, SR 57 turns northeast onto Chatham Road, which intersects the eastern end of SR 457 (Old Chatham Road), crosses several forks of Leatherwood Creek, and passes to the south of Turkeycock Mountain.

SR 57 becomes Callands Road on entering Pittsylvania County. The state highway meets the northern end of SR 41 (Franklin Turnpike) at Callands south of Brier Mountain. SR 57 crosses the Banister River and passes through the hamlets of Rondo and Hollywood on its way to the Pittsylvania County seat of Chatham. The state highway enters the town by crossing Cherrystone Creek and becomes Depot Street, which passes under Norfolk Southern's Durham District rail line. Near the Pittsylvania County Courthouse, SR 57 joins US 29 Business on a short concurrency along Main Street. The state highway leaves the town on Halifax Road, which passes to the south of Chatham Hall and has a diamond interchange with US 29. SR 57 crosses the Banister River again and passes along the northern edge of White Oak Mountain. The state highway passes through the hamlets of Shockoe, Lucks, Ebenezer, and Peytonsburg before entering Halifax County, where the highway becomes Chatham Road. SR 57 curves south and crosses Sandy Creek just west of its mouth at the Banister River before reaching its eastern terminus at SR 360 (Mountain Road) west of Halifax.

== Major intersections ==
County	Location	mi	km	Destinations	Notes
Patrick		0.00	0.00	SR 8 (Woolwine Highway) – Stuart, Floyd	Western terminus
Patrick		7.88	12.68	SR 346 north (Fairystone Lake Drive) – Fairystone Park, Ferrum College	
Henry	Bassett	16.72	26.91	SR 57 Alt. east (Riverside Drive)	Western terminus of SR 57 Alt.
Henry	Stanleytown			SR 903 (Henry Street / T.B. Stanley Highway) to SR 57A	former SR 57A west
Henry	Bassett Forks	20.56	33.09	US 220 north / US 220 Bus. south – Collinsville, Martinsville, Roanoke	Cloverleaf interchange; west end of concurrency with US 220
Henry		21.33	34.33	US 220 south – Greensboro	eastbound exit and westbound entrance; east end of concurrency with US 220
City of Martinsville		26.69	42.95	US 220 Bus. north (Memorial Boulevard) / SR 457 east (Church Street)	West end of concurrency with US 220 Business
City of Martinsville		27.79	44.72	US 58 Bus. west / US 220 Bus. south (Memorial Boulevard)	East end of concurrency with US 220 Business; west end of concurrency with US 58 Business
City of Martinsville				To US 220 Bus. north / SR 174 / Hooker Street	
Henry		30.87	49.68	US 58 Bus. east (A.L. Philpott Highway) – Danville	East end of concurrency with US 58 Business
Henry				SR 457 west (Old Chatham Road) / SR 925 (Stockton Road)	Eastern terminus of SR 457
Pittsylvania	Callands	48.62	78.25	SR 41 south (Franklin Turnpike) – Danville	Northern terminus of SR 41
Pittsylvania	Callands			SR 969 (Sago Road)	former SR 41 north
Pittsylvania	Chatham	60.39	97.19	US 29 Bus. north (Main Street)	West end of concurrency with US 29 Business
Pittsylvania	Chatham	60.58	97.49	US 29 Bus. south (Main Street)	East end of concurrency with US 29 Business
Pittsylvania		61.47	98.93	US 29 – Gretna, Danville	Diamond interchange
Halifax	Mountain Road	88.70	142.75	SR 360 (Mountain Road)	Eastern terminus
1.000 mi = 1.609 km; 1.000 km = 0.621 mi: Concurrency terminus

== SR 57 Alternate ==
State Route 57 Alternate
- Location: Bassett
- Length: 4.09 mi (6.58 km)

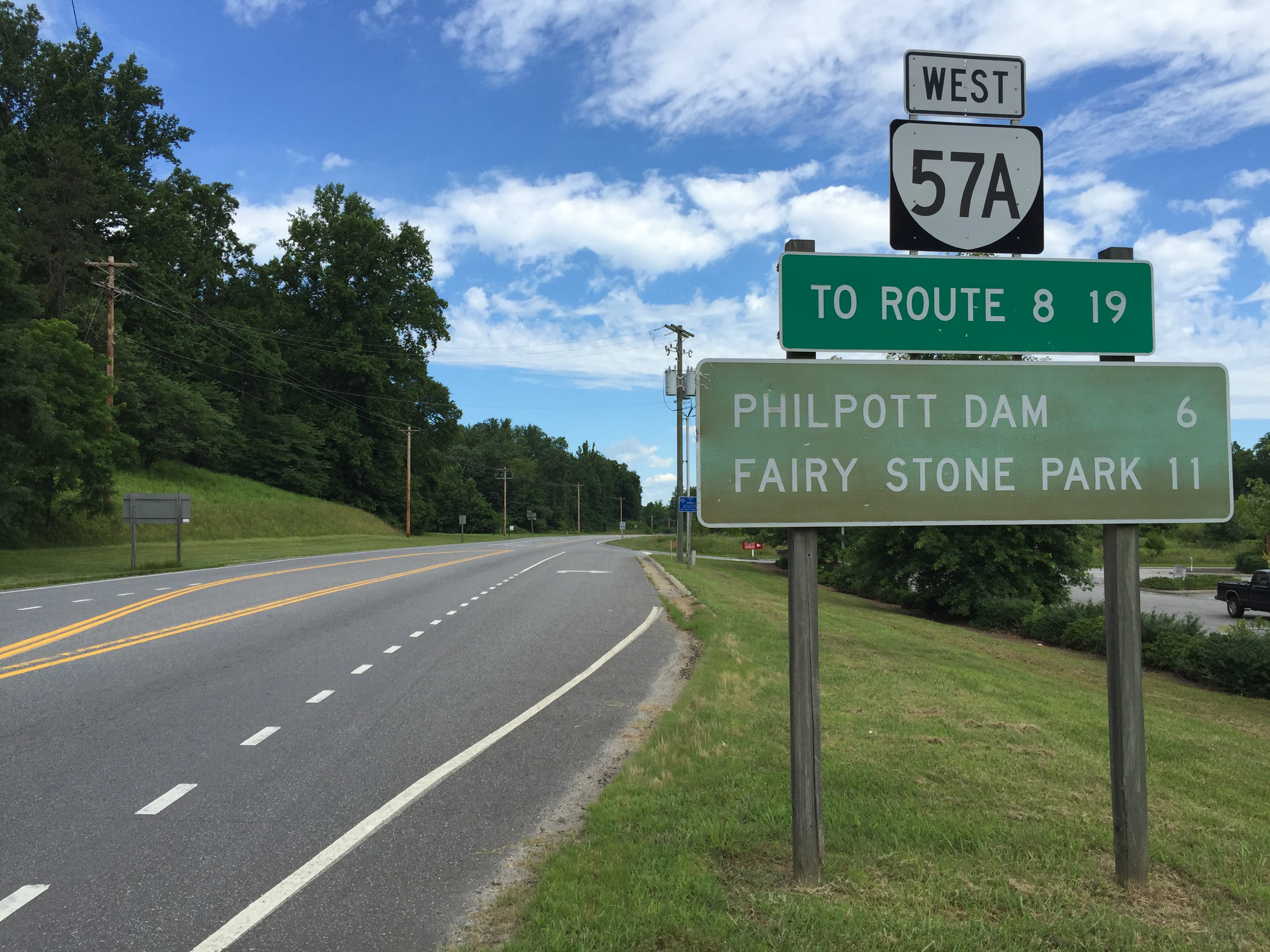
View west along SR 57A near Stanleytown

SR 57 Alternate (SR 57 Alt., signed as SR 57A) is a 4.09-mile-long (6.58 km) alternate route of SR 57 between an intersection with SR 57 in Bassett to an interchange with US 220 near Fieldale. At SR 57 Alt.'s western terminus, SR 57 crosses the Smith River and stays on its eastern bank while SR 57 Alt. remains on the west side throughout its entire route. From Bassett, the route travels southeast on Riverside Drive mostly through small residential neighborhoods. After passing the T.B. Stanley Highway (Secondary Route 903), SR 57 Alt. enters a more commercialized area and intersects the entrance driveway to the Bassett High School. At Great Road, the road's name changes to River Road. About 0.8 miles (1.3 km) later, SR 57 Alt. ends at a diamond interchange with the US 220 freeway that bypasses Martinsville. River Road continues southeast as Secondary Route 682 towards Fieldale.

< SR 56	Two‑digit State Routes; 1923-1933	SR 58 >
