= John D. Bassett High School =

Historic building in Virginia, US

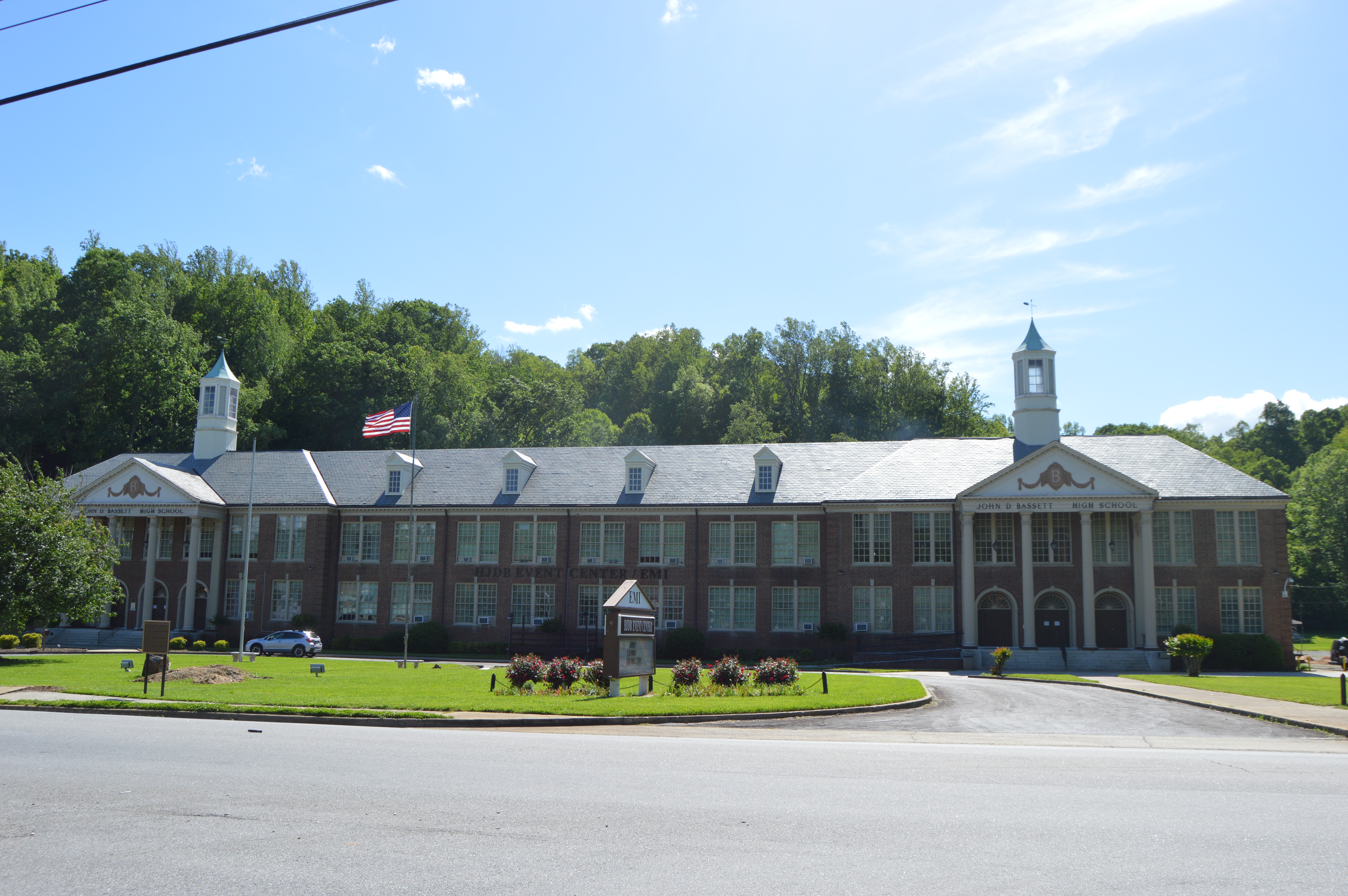

Location
- 3289 Riverside Drive; Henry County; Bassett, Virginia 24055; United States

Information
- School type: Public high school
- Established: 1949
- Closed: 1979
- School district: Henry County Public Schools
- Grades: 9-12
- Gender: co-educational
- Campus type: Rural
- Colors: Blue & White
- Athletics conference: Virginia High School League
- Mascot: Bassett Bengal
- Nickname: Bengals
- Rival: Martinsville High School
- Website: Site

- John D. Bassett High School
- U.S. National Register of Historic Places
- Virginia Landmarks Register
- Location within Virginia Location within the United States
- Location: State Route 57, Bassett, Virginia
- Coordinates: 36°45′44″N 79°59′47″W
- Area: 4 acres (1.6 ha)
- Built: 1947-1948
- Architect: Dixon and Norman
- Architectural style: Colonial Revival
- NRHP reference No.: 05001587
- VLR No.: 044-5169

Significant dates
- Added to NRHP: February 3, 2006
- Designated VLR: December 7, 2005

John D. Bassett High School, also known as Bassett Middle School, is a historic school building located at Bassett, Henry County, Virginia. It was built in 1947–1948, and is a two-story Georgian Revival style brick school building. A rear addition was built in 1961. It has three bay portico entrances at each end with cupolas above. They provide public access to the two community spaces on the interior – the auditorium at one end and the gymnasium at the other. The building features a hip roof with slate shingles, gabled dormers and octagonal cupolas; and Flemish-bond variant brickwork with corner quoins and a water table. It was replaced by the Bassett High School in 1979, and continued to operate as a middle school. The school closed in 2004.

It was listed on the National Register of Historic Places in 2006.
