= Virginia State Route 108 =

State highway in Henry County, Virginia, US

State Route 108
- Figsboro Road

Route information
- Maintained by VDOT
- Length: 4.24 mi (6.82 km)
- Existed: 1933–present

Major junctions
- South end: SR 174 near Collinsville
- North end: SR 657 / SR 890 at Figsboro

Location
- Country: United States
- State: Virginia
- Counties: Henry

Highway system
- Virginia Routes; Interstate; US; Primary; Secondary; Byways; History; HOT lanes
← SR 107	→ SR 109

State Route 108 (SR 108) is a primary state highway in the U.S. state of Virginia. Known as Figsboro Road, the state highway runs 4.24 miles (6.82 km) from SR 174 near Collinsville north to SR 657 and SR 890 at Figsboro.

== Route description ==
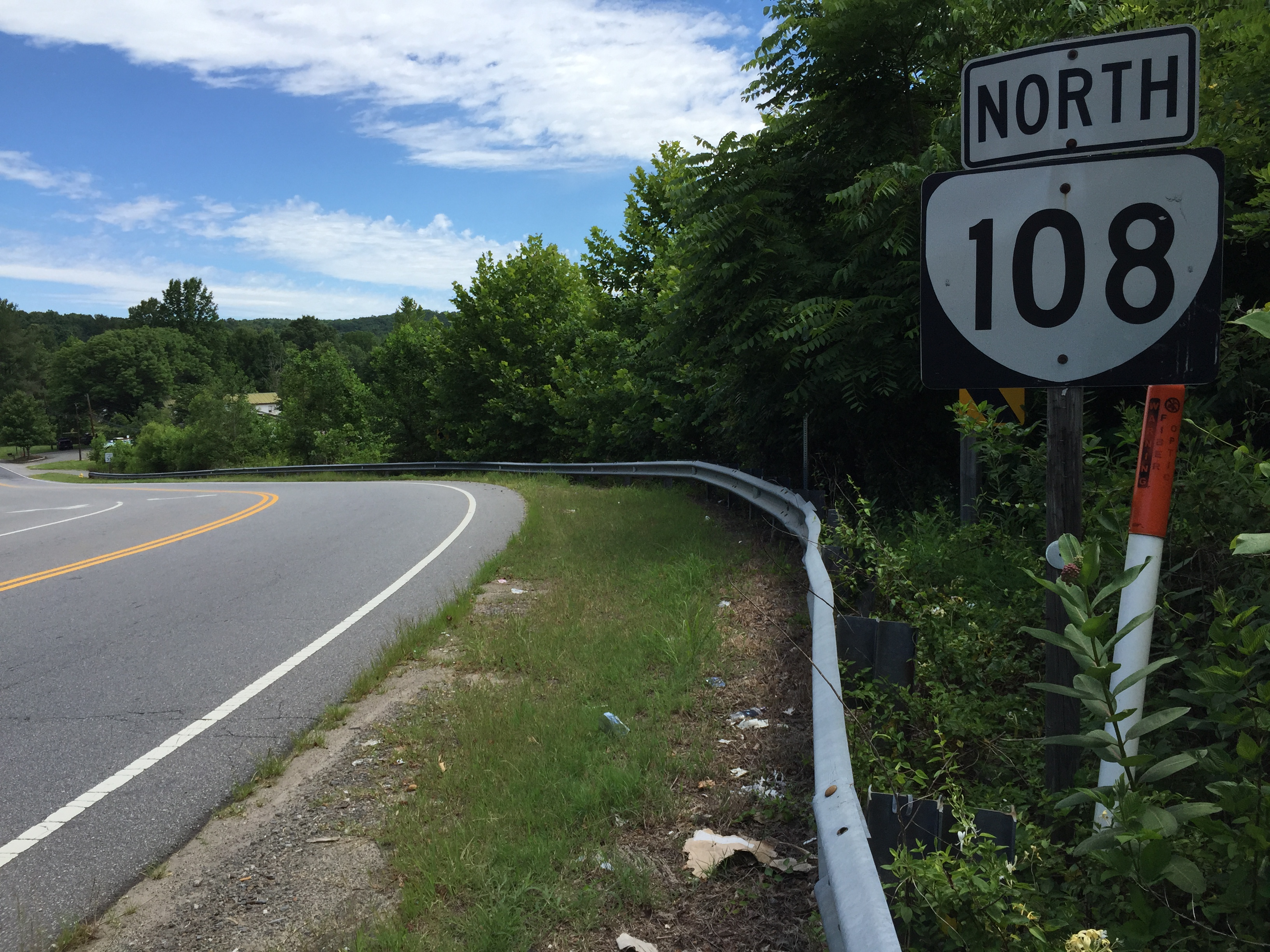
View north at the south end of SR 108 at SR 174 near Collinsville

SR 108 begins at an acute intersection with SR 174 (Kings Mountain Road) east of Collinsville and north of Martinsville. The state highway heads north as a two-lane undivided road through northern Henry County. SR 108 reaches its northern terminus at its intersection with SR 657 (Old Quarry Road) at Figsboro. Figsboro Road continues north as SR 890 toward SR 40 at Penhook in southern Franklin County.

== Major intersections ==
The entire route is in Henry County.

Location	mi	km	Destinations	Notes
	0.00	0.00	SR 174 (Kings Mountain Road) to US 220 – Martinsville, Henry County Administration, Patrick & Henry Community College	Southern terminus
Figsboro	4.24	6.82	SR 657 (Old Quarry Road) / SR 890 (Figsboro Road)	Northern terminus
1.000 mi = 1.609 km; 1.000 km = 0.621 mi

< SR 201	District 2 State Routes; 1928–1933	SR 203 >
