= Virginia State Route 41 =

State highway in southern Virginia, US

State Route 41
- Franklin Turnpike

Route information
- Maintained by VDOT
- Length: 22.5 mi (36.2 km)
- Existed: July 1, 1933–present

Major junctions
- South end: SR 360 near Danville
- US 29 near Danville
- North end: SR 57 in Callands

Location
- Country: United States
- State: Virginia
- Counties: Pittsylvania, City of Danville

Highway system
- Virginia Routes; Interstate; US; Primary; Secondary; Byways; History; HOT lanes
| ← SR 40 | → SR 42 |

State Route 41 (SR 41) is a primary state highway in the U.S. state of Virginia. Known as Franklin Turnpike, the state highway runs 22.5 miles (36.2 km) from SR 360 northeast of Danville to SR 57 in Callands. The Virginia Department of Transportation (VDOT) officially designates the route north of U.S. Route 29 Business (US 29 Bus.) in Danville as a part of SR 41 but the Franklin Turnpike south and east of this point is signed as SR 41.

== Route description ==
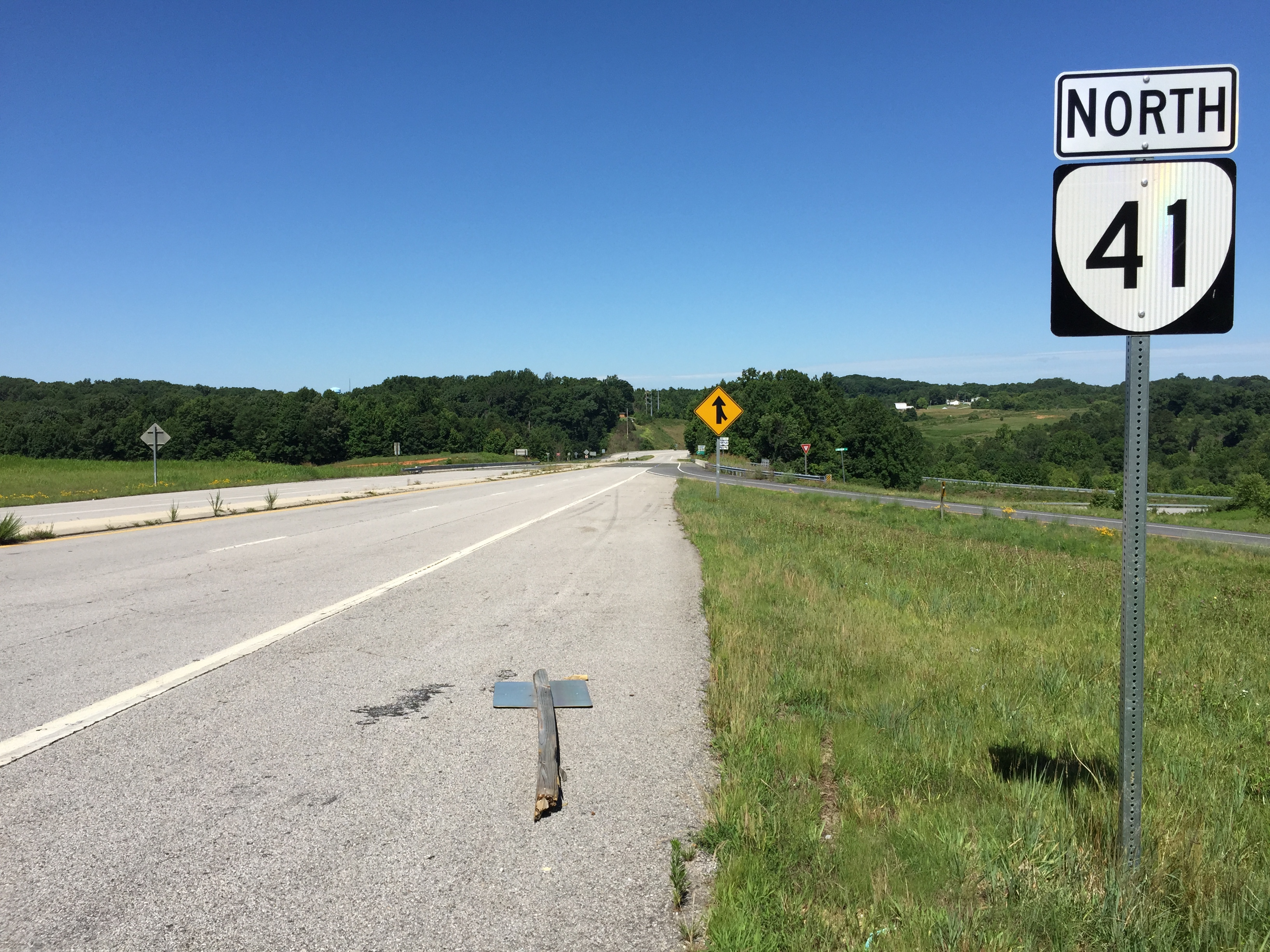
View north at the south end of SR 41 at SR 360 and US 29 near Danville

SR 41 begins at a stop-controlled T-intersection with SR 360 (Old Richmond Road) in an unincorporated area of Pittsylvania County. The route starts as a four-lane divided highway and within 0.2 miles (0.32 km) of its southern terminus, it has an interchange with the US 29 freeway. After the interchange, SR 41 crosses over Falls Creek and a railroad on a 640-foot-long (200 m), curved bridge. While traveling over the bridge, the route enters the city limits of Danville. The route has only a few driveways and one road intersection before its intersection with SR 293 (Main Street). The highway then heads northwest through a more residential neighborhood and intersects US 29 Bus. (Piney Forest Road) before leaving the independent city and reentering Pittsylvania County. SR 41 passes through the unincorporated communities of Mount Hermon and Pleasant Gap, where the highway crosses White Oak Mountain. The state highway curves west then veers north at Swansonville. SR 41 reaches its northern terminus at SR 57 (Callands Road) in Callands. The state highway follows the height of land north of the watershed of the Sandy River, which empties into the Dan River in Danville. To the north of SR 41 are the watersheds of Little Falls Creek east of White Oak Mountain and the Bannister River west of the mountain; these streams empty into the Dan River at Danville and near South Boston, respectively.

== History ==
Prior to 1949, the route continued north past VA 57 down what is now SR 969 Sago Road/Danville Turnpike into Franklin County, where it met up with what is now SR 890 Snow Creek Road, then VA 108. This might explain why VA 40 east of Rocky Mount in Franklin County is named "Old Franklin Turnpike" while VA 41 is named Franklin Turnpike.

The route was truncated to its present northern terminus at SR 57 in 1949 due to low traffic counts. In August 1962, the Commonwealth Transportation Board (CTB) approved a motion to drop the 0.92-mile-long (1.48 km) segment of SR 41 between North Main Street (US 29) and Piney Forest Road (what was then Alt. US 29) at the same time major highways were constructed throughout downtown Danville. Despite this truncation, the route continued to be signed to North Main Street.

In 2001, the Franklin Turnpike Extension was approved by the CTB to be constructed. Initially, the new road was designated SR 265. The portion of the extension from the US 29 interchange to SR 360 had already been completed when construction on the remainder of the extension began. The project (later renamed to East Franklin Turnpike and renumbered to be a part of SR 41) was completed in late 2011 at a cost of US$19,000,000.

== Major intersections ==
| County | Location | mi | km | Destinations | Notes |
|---|---|---|---|---|---|
| Pittsylvania | | 0.0 | 0.0 | SR 360 (Old Richmond Road) – Halifax, Danville, Richmond | Southern terminus |
| Pittsylvania | | 0.2 | 0.32 | US 29 – Greensboro, Lynchburg | Partial cloverleaf interchange |
| City of Danville | | 1.5 | 2.4 | SR 293 (North Main Street) | |
| City of Danville | | 2.4 | 3.9 | US 29 Bus. (Piney Forest Road) | |
| Pittsylvania | Callands | 22.5 | 36.2 | SR 57 (Callands Road) – Martinsville, Chatham | Northern terminus |
1.000 mi = 1.609 km; 1.000 km = 0.621 mi
