= Delvin Joyce =

American football player (born 1978)

No. 33
- Position: Running back/return specialist

Personal information
- Born: September 21, 1978 (age 48); Martinsville, Virginia, U.S.
- Listed height: 5 ft 7 in (1.70 m)
- Listed weight: 195 lb (88 kg)

Career information
- High school: Fieldale-Collinsville (Collinsville, Virginia)
- College: James Madison
- NFL draft: 2001: undrafted

Career history
- New York Giants (2002–2004); New York Jets (2005)*
- * Offseason or practice squad member only

Awards and highlights
- First Division I-AA player with 1,000 career yards each in rushing, receiving, punt returns, and kick returns (2000)

Career NFL statistics
- Kick return yards: 1,085
- Kick return average: 22.6
- Punt return yards: 219
- Punt return average: 8.1
- Rushing yards: 41
- Rushing average: 3.2
- Receiving yards: 12
- Stats at Pro Football Reference

Delvin Lemar Joyce (born September 21, 1978) is an American financial advisor and former American football running back and return specialist. He played college football at James Madison. Joyce rose from a walk-on to become an honorable mention All-American and the first player in Division I-AA history to reach 1,000 career yards in rushing, receiving, punt returns, and kickoff returns.

Joyce then entered the NFL as an undrafted free agent. He played from 2002 to 2004 for the New York Giants mainly as a return specialist. After retiring from football, Joyce became a financial advisor with Prudential Financial.

== Early life and college career ==
Born in Martinsville, Virginia, Joyce graduated from Fieldale-Collinsville High School in Collinsville, Virginia in 1996 and walked on the James Madison Dukes football team at James Madison University. Joyce then played at tailback for James Madison from 1997 to 2000. At James Madison, Joyce became the first player in Division I-AA and second in all of Division I to reach 1,000 career yards in all four statistical categories of rushing (1,260), receiving (1,009), punt returns (1,488), and kickoff returns (1,902). Football Weekly named Joyce an honorable mention All-American return specialist.

== Pro football career ==
Joyce was not selected in the 2001 NFL draft, and no team signed him as a free agent. He worked as a financial planner during the 2001 NFL season before signing with the New York Giants on January 15, 2002.

Playing 28 games in 2002 and 2003, Joyce had 27 punt returns for 219 yards, 48 kickoff returns for 1,085 yards, 13 rushing attempts for 41 yards, four receptions for 12 yards, and five tackles.

In 2004, Joyce sat out the season due to a hip injury. On April 26, 2005, Joyce signed with the New York Jets. The Jets cut Joyce on August 8.

== Post-football career ==
Joyce moved to Charlotte, North Carolina after retiring from football. In October 2006, Joyce became a financial services associate at Prudential Financial in North Carolina. He was promoted to manager in December 2007; by 2009 he was ranked among Prudential's top 30 financial services manager. In 2012, Joyce moved to Wellington, Florida after becoming a managing director at Prudential Advisors. Joyce returned to Charlotte to work as a financial planner at Prudential's Charlotte office in 2017.
