= Virginia State Route 457 =

State highway in Virginia, United States

State Route 457

Route information
- Maintained by VDOT
- Length: 5.80 mi (9.33 km)
- Existed: early 1990s–present

Major junctions
- West end: US 220 Bus. / SR 57 in Martinsville
- SR 174 in Martinsville
- East end: SR 57 / SR 925 near Martinsville

Location
- Country: United States
- State: Virginia
- Counties: City of Martinsville, Henry

Highway system
- Virginia Routes; Interstate; US; Primary; Secondary; Byways; History; HOT lanes
← US 421	→ US 460

State Route 457 (SR 457) is a primary state highway in the U.S. state of Virginia. The state highway runs 5.80 miles (9.33 km) from U.S. Route 220 Business (US 220 Business) and SR 57 in Martinsville east to SR 57 near Martinsville in eastern Henry County.

== Route description ==
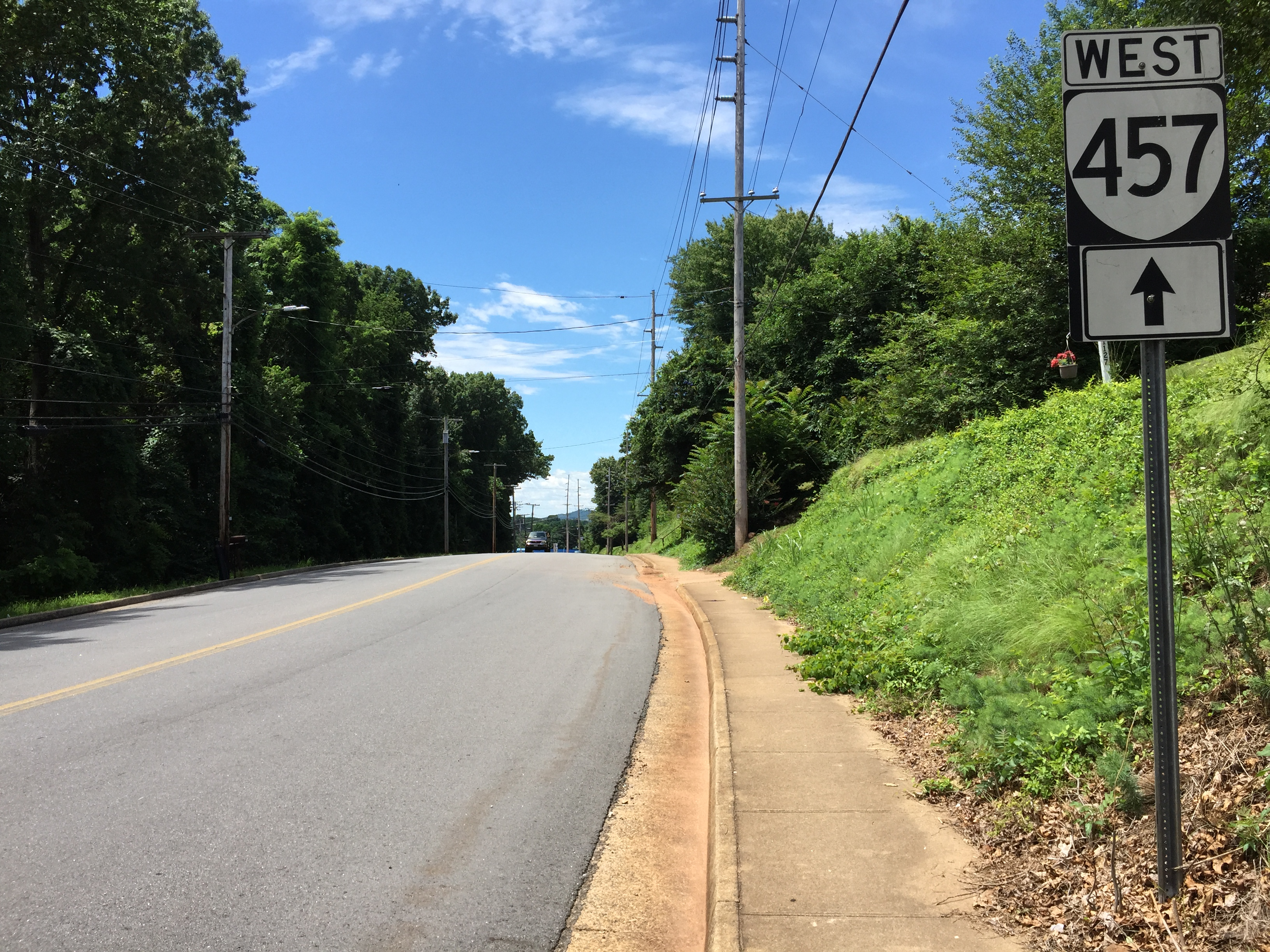
View west along SR 457 in Martinsville

SR 457 begins at a five-way intersection with US 220 Business and SR 57 in the independent city of Martinsville. Memorial Boulevard heads northwest–southeast with US 220 Business in both directions and eastbound SR 57 heading southeast. Westbound SR 57 heads southwest on Fayette Street. SR 457 starts by following a pair of two-way streets; eastbound SR 457 follows two-lane undivided Church Street and westbound SR 457 uses Fayette Street through a residential area. At the west end of downtown Martinsville, the eastbound highway turns north onto four-lane divided Market Street. The two directions of the state highway come together at the intersection of Market and Fayette streets.

SR 457 follows Market Street to Commonwealth Boulevard. The state highway turns east onto the four-lane divided highway and meets the eastern end of SR 174 (Liberty Street). SR 457 passes under Franklin Street and crosses over the Dick & Willie Passage Rail Trail. The state highway passes Martinsville High School and reduces to a two-lane undivided road at Fairy Street before reaching Chatham Road adjacent to Hooker Field, home of the Martinsville Mustangs of minor league baseball. Chatham Road leads south to SR 57 and US 58 Business, which leads east toward US 58 and Danville. SR 457 turns north onto Chatham Road and leaves the city of Martinsville. The state highway is known as Old Chatham Road in Henry County, where the highway follows a winding path before reaching its eastern terminus at SR 57 (Chatham Road).

== Major intersections ==
County	Location	mi	km	Destinations	Notes
City of Martinsville		0.00	0.00	US 220 Bus. / SR 57 (Memorial Boulevard / Fayette Street)	Western terminus
City of Martinsville				To Commonwealth Boulevard / US 220 Bus. – Roanoke, Greensboro	
City of Martinsville		0.86	1.38	SR 174 west (Liberty Street) – Industrial Park, Patrick & Henry Community College	Eastern terminus of SR 174
City of Martinsville				To SR 57 / US 58 Bus. / Fairy Street – Danville, Chatham	
City of Martinsville				To US 58 Bus. / Chatham Road	former SR 57 west
Henry		5.80	9.33	SR 57 (Chatham Road) / SR 925 (Stockton Road)	Eastern terminus
1.000 mi = 1.609 km; 1.000 km = 0.621 mi
