= Magna Vista High School =

Public high school in Virginia, US

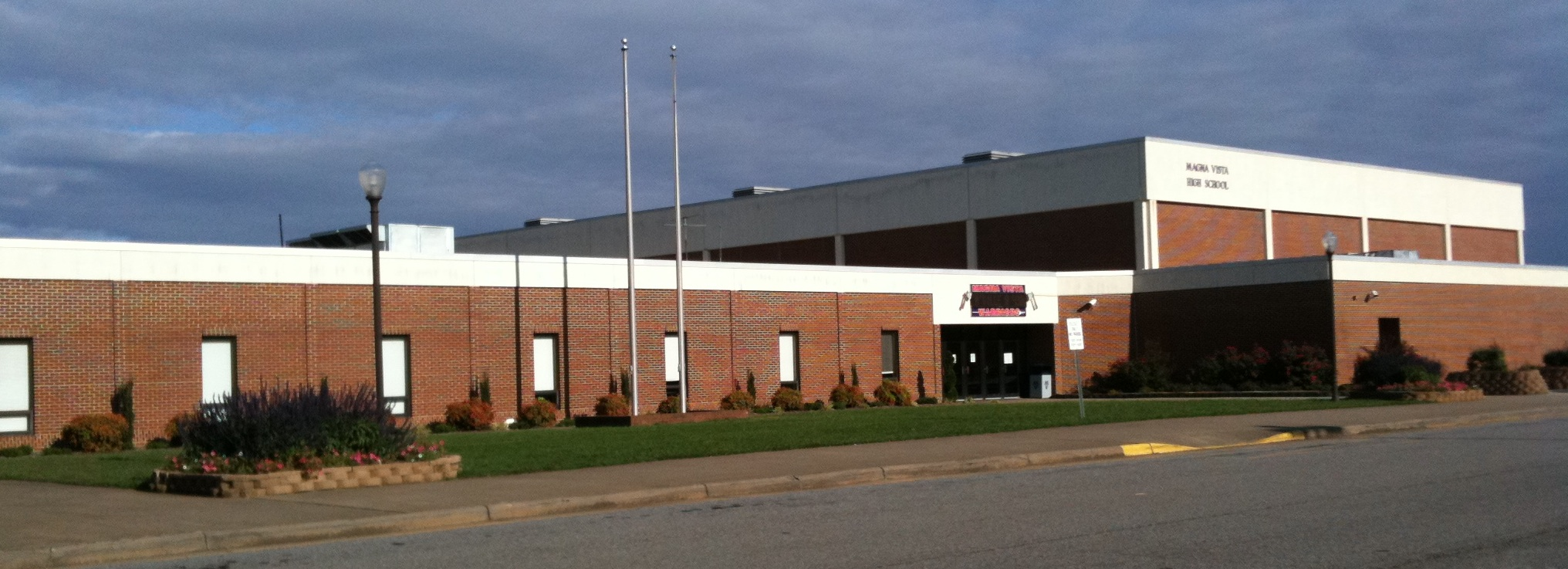

Location
- 701 Magna Vista School Road; Ridgeway, Virginia, Henry County 24148; United States; 36°35′35″N 79°53′28″W

Information
- Other names: Magna Vista, MVHS
- School type: Public high school
- Established: 1988
- School district: Henry County Public Schools
- NCES District ID: 5101920
- Superintendent: Dr Amy Blake-Lewis
- NCES School ID: 510192002125
- Principal: Dr Josh Bocock
- Teaching staff: 89.01 (on an FTE basis)
- Grades: 9–12
- Gender: co-educational
- Enrollment: 1,147 (2024–25)
- Student to teacher ratio: 12.89
- Hours in school day: 8:25AM–3:25PM
- Campus type: Rural
- Colors: Navy, Red, & Silver
- Athletics conference: Virginia High School League; 3A West Classification
- Sports: basketball, football, baseball, volleyball, cross country, golf, softball, swimming, track & field, tennis, wrestling
- Mascot: Warrior
- Nickname: Warriors
- Rivals: Martinsville High School; Bassett High School
- Accreditation: Virginia Department of Education
- Feeder schools: Laurel Park Middle School
- Website: magnavista.henry.k12.va.us

Magna Vista High School is a four-year comprehensive public high school in Henry County, Virginia, United States. Named for the Magna Vista plantation which occupied the land where it sits, it is approximately three miles west of the town of Ridgeway, Virginia and ten miles (16 km) south of the city of Martinsville, Virginia. Magna Vista currently enrolls approximately 1100 students in grades 9–12. It is one of two comprehensive high schools operated by Henry County Public Schools.

Opened in 1988, the campus consists of a state-of-the-art greenhouse, livestock barn, and extensive athletic facilities. The school is on a wooded 110-acre (0.45 km^{2}) tract of land close to Chestnut Knob, the highest point in Henry County.

== History ==
Magna Vista High School replaced the former Drewry Mason High School and George Washington Carver High School, both of which became middle schools. Declining enrollment in the 1990s left each of the four Henry County high schools operating at less than 50% capacity, and long-term deferred maintenance left many schools in a state of disrepair. In 2004, the county implemented a reorganization plan that closed five schools and consolidated four high schools and four middle schools to create two high schools and two middle schools.

Laurel Park High School and Magna Vista High School were consolidated at the Magna Vista site. The school name and mascot remained the same but red, one of the Laurel Park school colors, was added to the Magna Vista navy blue, silver, and white. Following its closure as a high school, Laurel Park became a middle school serving students in the Magna Vista attendance zone.

== Demographics ==
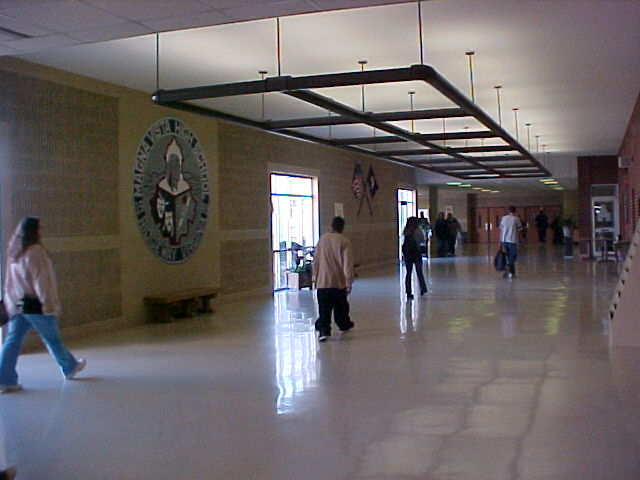
Commons

Magna Vista High School's student body is 57% White; 32% Black; and 7% Hispanic. 52% of Magna Vista students receive free or reduced lunch.

The school serves a large, mostly rural geographic area which encompasses the communities of Axton, Chatmoss, Chestnut Knob, Horse Pasture, Irisburg, Laurel Park, Leatherwood, Preston, Rich Acres, Ridgeway, Sandy Level, Spencer, Mountain Valley, and the eastern, southern, and western suburbs of Martinsville.

Axton Elementary, Drewry Mason Elementary, Mt. Olivet Elementary, and Rich Acres Elementary feed into Laurel Park Middle School which feeds into Magna Vista High School. The current principal is Dr. Josh Bocock.

Reflecting the long-term enrollment decline in Henry County Public Schools, Magna Vista's student population has decreased by almost 300 students since 2004.

== Academics ==
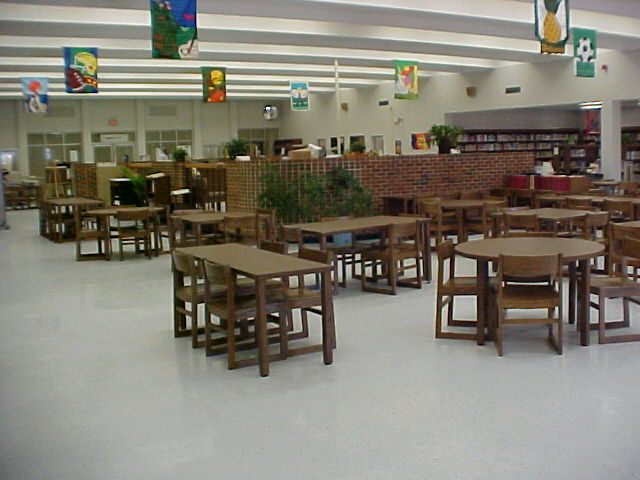
Library Media Center

The school operates on a 4x4 block schedule. The school year is divided into two semesters and six six-week grading periods. Students may earn eight course credits during one school year.

Magna Vista offers students a program of studies that includes an extensive selection of Advanced Placement (AP) courses, as well as a wide variety of career and technical course offerings. The school provides opportunities for highly motivated and intellectually gifted students to attend the Piedmont Governor's School for Mathematics, Science, and Technology, which is on the campus of Patrick & Henry Community College. The ACE (Accelerated College Education) program was introduced during the 2008–2009 school year. Students enrolled in ACE are dually enrolled in high school and community college courses and earn an associate degree from Patrick & Henry Community College upon graduation. Students not opting to complete the full ACE program can take individual dual enrollment classes and earn community college credit that in many cases can be transferred to a four-year college or university.

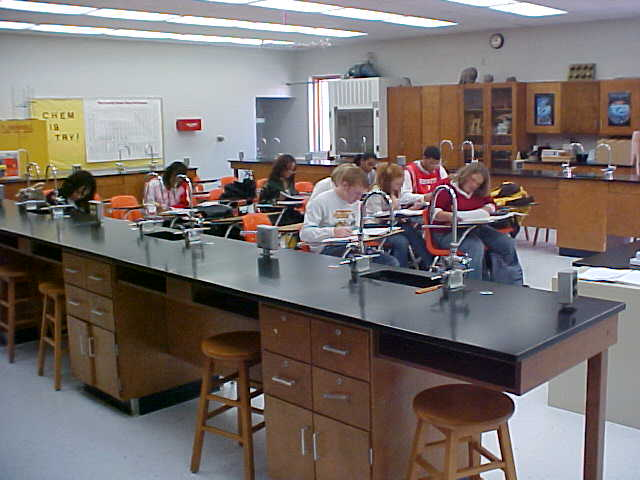
Chemistry Lab

Magna Vista High School is fully accredited by the Commonwealth of Virginia based on the 2010-2011 results of the Virginia Standards of Learning tests. The school has met federal standards for Adequate Yearly Progress (AYP) as required by the No Child Left Behind Act of 2001.

== Athletics ==
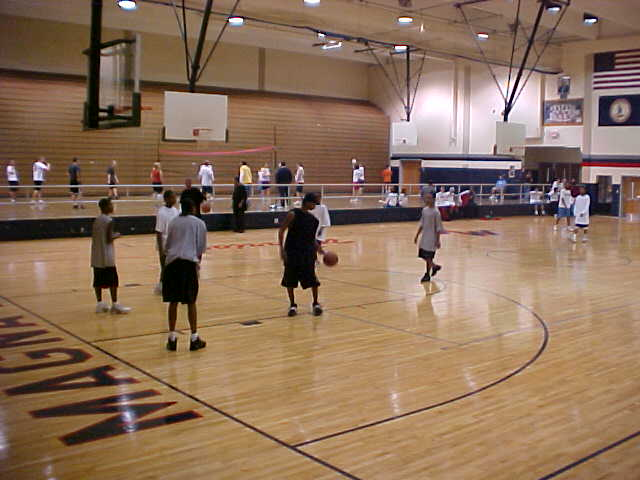
Gym

Magna Vista teams play in the 3A West classification. The mascot is the Warrior. Magna Vista made history by becoming the first high school to win a state title during its first year of operation with its victory in the 1989 AA boys basketball championship.

The school won the state AA boys basketball title in 1998, the AA girls basketball championship in 2004, and the AA golf title in 2005. The Warriors won the Virginia football 3A state championship in 2014 and 2015.

== Notable alumni ==
- Tony Gravely – UFC Fighter
