= PHCC =

PHCC may refer to:

- Pasco–Hernando Community College
- Patrick & Henry Community College
- Primary health care center
- Plumbing-Heating-Cooling Contractors Association
