= Blue Ridge Regional Library =

Public library system in Virginia, USA

The Blue Ridge Regional Library (SBRL) is a library system that serves counties in Virginia. The library system is within Region 2 of the Virginia Library Association (VLA).

== Service area ==
According to the FY 2014 Institute of Museum and Library Services Data Catalog, the Library System has a service area population of 86,403 with 1 central library in Martinsville, Virginia and 4 branch libraries in Bassett, Collinsville, Stuart, and in Ridgeway.

== Branches ==
- Basset Branch
- Collinsville Branch
- Martinsville Main Branch
- Patrick County Branch
- Ridgeway Branch
