= Bassett High School =

Coordinates: 36.72800°N 79.96186°W

Location
- 85 Riverside Drive; Henry County; Bassett, Virginia 24055; United States

Information
- School type: Public high school
- Established: 1979
- School district: Henry County Public Schools
- Principal: Michael Minter
- Grades: 9-12
- Gender: co-educational
- Enrollment: 1,095 (2021-22)
- Campus type: Rural
- Colors: Blue, Orange, & White
- Athletics conference: Virginia High School League; AA Region IV; Piedmont District
- Mascot: Bassett Bengal
- Nickname: Bengals
- Rival: Magna Vista High School; Martinsville High School
- Accreditation: Virginia Department of Education
- Feeder schools: Fieldale-Collinsville Middle School
- Website: Official Site

Bassett High School is a four-year comprehensive public high school in Bassett, Virginia, United States. The school currently enrolls about 1,100 students in grades 9–12. It is one of two public high schools operated by Henry County Schools.

Opened in 1978, the school is located approximately two miles south of the Bassett community in Henry County, Virginia.

Campbell Court Elementary, Carver Elementary, Meadowview Elementary, Sanville Elementary, and Stanleytown Elementary feed into Fieldale-Collinsville Middle School, which feeds into Bassett High School.

== History ==
Bassett High School opened in 1978, replacing the former John D. Bassett High School, which became a middle school. Declining enrollment in the 1990s left each of the four Henry County high schools operating at less than 50% capacity. In 2003, the county implemented a controversial reorganization plan which consolidated Fieldale-Collinsville High School and Bassett High School at the Bassett High School site. The school name and mascot remained the same but orange, one of the Fieldale-Collinsville school colors, was added to the Bassett blue and white. Following its closure as a high school, Fieldale-Collinsville became a middle school, serving students in the Bassett High School attendance zone.

== Demographics ==
Bassett High School's student body is 73% White; 21% Black; and 5% Hispanic. All Bassett students receive free lunch.

The school serves a geographic area which encompasses the communities of Bassett, Collinsville, Fieldale, Oak Level, Stanleytown and Villa Heights. The current principal is Tiffiny M. Gravely.

== Academics ==
The school operates on a 4x4 block schedule. The school year is divided into two semesters and six six-week grading periods. Students may earn eight course credits during one school year. Students are also offered summer school programs to boost their GPAs.

Bassett High School's program of studies includes ten Advanced Placement (AP) courses, and other career development and technical courses. The school provides opportunities for some of its students to attend the Piedmont Governor's School for Mathematics, Science, and Technology, which is located at 191 Fayette Street, In Martinsville, Virginia.

=== Accreditation ===
Bassett High School is fully accredited based on the 2010-2011 results of the Virginia Standards of Learning tests. The school has met federal standards for Adequate Yearly Progress (AYP) as required by the No Child Left Behind Act of 2001.

== Athletics and extracurricular programs ==
Bassett teams play in the AA Piedmont District of the AA Region IV. The mascot is the Bengal. The Bengal athletic program competes in the Virginia High School League's interscholastic sports. The varsity football team won the AA Region IV championship in 2006. Prior to consolidation, the school won the state AA girls' basketball championship in 2000 and the AA boys' track title in 1980.

Martinsville High School has been a traditional rival, but a strong rivalry has emerged with Magna Vista High School since the reorganization of the county schools.

Bassett High School's Quizbowl team won third in the state at the 2020 state Beta Convention.

== Bassett Marching Band ==
Bassett's marching band is a nationally recognized organization that participates in several local, state, and national competitions. In 2009, 2010, 2011, 2012, and 2013, the band won the Virginia state title in the United States Scholastic Band Association and placed second in its class in the national competition in 2009 and 2011, third in 2010 and 2017, and fourth in 2012.

== Notable alumni ==
- DeVone Claybrooks, Former NFL player
- Randy Hundley, Former MLB player (San Francisco Giants, Chicago Cubs, Minnesota Twins, San Diego Padres)
- Jim Phillips Sr., North Carolina state senator
