= Virginia State Route 174 =

State highway in Virginia, United States

State Route 174

Route information
- Maintained by VDOT
- Length: 5.58 mi (8.98 km)
- Existed: 1978–present

Major junctions
- West end: US 220 Bus. in Collinsville
- SR 108 near Collinsville
- East end: SR 457 in Martinsville

Location
- Country: United States
- State: Virginia
- Counties: Henry, City of Martinsville

Highway system
- Virginia Routes; Interstate; US; Primary; Secondary; Byways; History; HOT lanes
← SR 173	→ SR 175

State Route 174 (SR 174) is a primary state highway in the U.S. state of Virginia. The state highway runs 5.58 miles (8.98 km) from U.S. Route 220 Business (US 220 Business) in Collinsville east to SR 457 in Martinsville. SR 174 is a C-shaped route between the de facto county seat of Henry County, Collinsville, and the nominal county seat and independent city of Martinsville.

== Route description ==
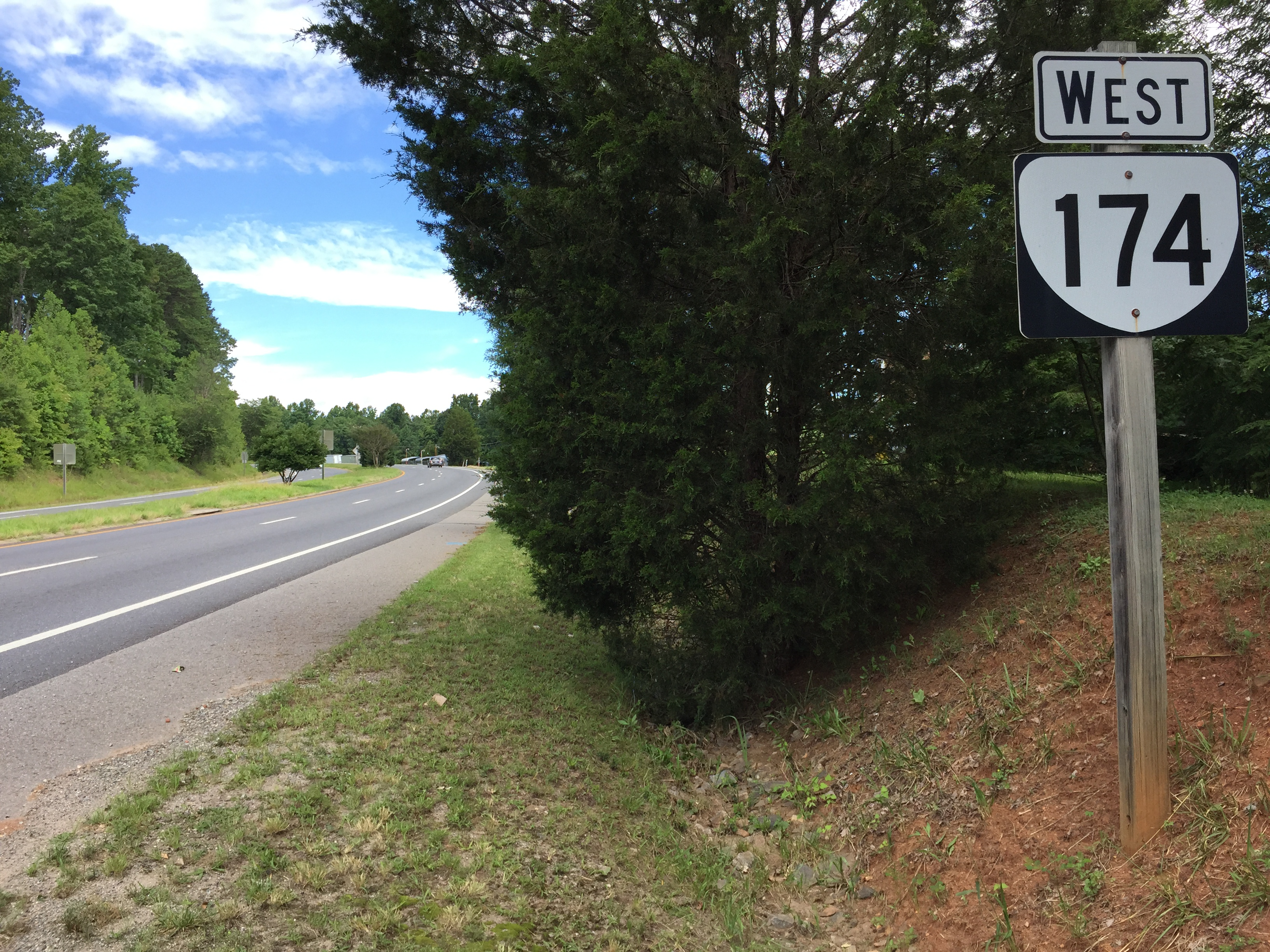
View west along SR 174 at SR 108 near Collinsville

SR 174 begins at an intersection with US 220 Business (Virginia Avenue) in Collinsville. The state highway heads northeast as Kings Mountain Road, a four-lane undivided highway. SR 174 becomes a divided highway as it curves east and passes by the Henry County offices and courthouse. The state highway curves south and intersects SR 108 (Figsboro Road) and SR 714 (College Drive), which serves Patrick & Henry Community College and several industrial parks. South of Beaver Creek Plantation, SR 174 becomes a three-lane road with a center left-turn lane and enters the city of Martinsville as Liberty Street. The state highway passes under the Dick & Willie Passage Rail Trail before reaching its eastern terminus at SR 457 (Commonwealth Boulevard) north of downtown Martinsville.

== Major intersections ==
County	Location	mi	km	Destinations	Notes
Henry	Collinsville	0.00	0.00	US 220 Bus. (Virginia Avenue)	Western terminus
Henry		2.57	4.14	SR 108 north (Figsboro Road) – Figsboro	Southern terminus of SR 108
City of Martinsville		5.58	8.98	SR 457 (Commonwealth Boulevard) to US 220 Bus.	Eastern terminus
1.000 mi = 1.609 km; 1.000 km = 0.621 mi
