= Old Chapel Church =

Historic church in Virginia, United States

Coordinates: 36°55′06″N 79°39′43″W

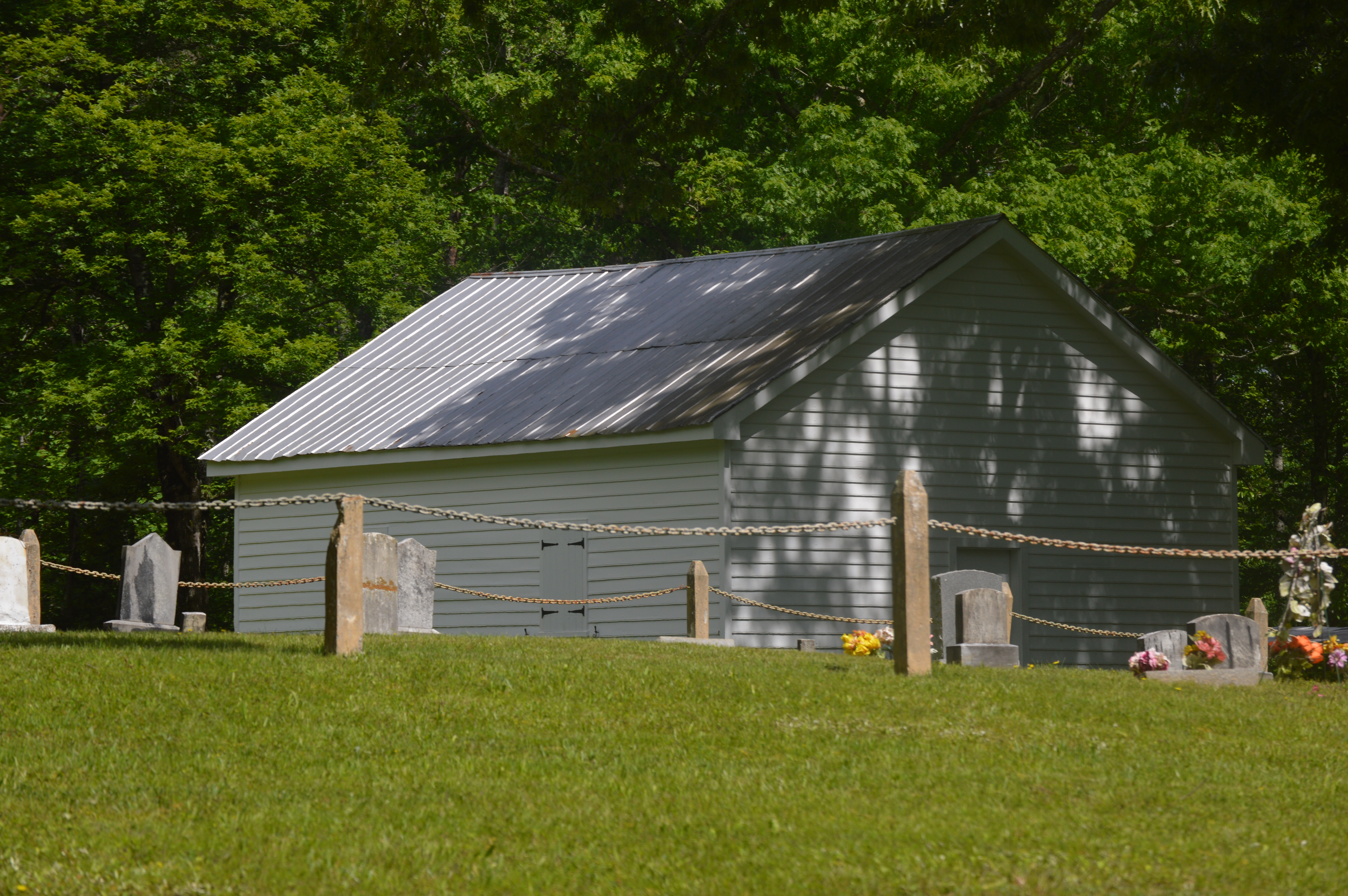
Roadside view

The Old Chapel Church, also known locally as the "Snow Creek Chapel", was built in 1769 as a chapel of ease for the Church of England parish in what is today Penhook, Virginia, United States.

== Construction ==
The chapel was 32 ft × 24 ft (10 m × 7.5 m), a frame house with clapboard roof, a plank floor, with pulpit and desk. There would be a pitch of 12' to the roof. There were to be two doors and five windows, with a small table and benches.

A typical chapel in Colonial Virginia was built as a frame church, and the Old Chapel Church has post and beam construction. Over one hundred frame churches similar to this existed in Virginia before the American Revolution: now only four are still standing. One of these frame churches is St. John's Episcopal Church (Richmond, Virginia), where Patrick Henry gave his famous "Give me liberty or give me death!" speech.

"Certain elements that he found confirmed the church's historic significance. The church had a chancel door, an exit located near the communion table, which is typical of 17th and 18th century Anglican churches, Lounsbury said."

"The ancient roadbed @ the SW corner of the lot is believed to be a remnant of the Pigg River Road. This road and several others provided a major East – West route through Franklin County, Virginia, and the Old Chapel became a familiar landmark along the road. The last member of Old Chapel Church, Mrs. Virginal Kelley, passed in 2009 at the age of 95."

In 2017, the Old Chapel Church was placed on the National Register of Historic Places. Gov. Terry McAuliffe has also deemed the church a "Virginia Treasure," a designation for ecological, cultural, scenic and recreational assets.

== King's House ==
The chapel was also known as "the King's House" at the time of the American Revolution. This was in part because the land and church were owned by the King of England as head of the church, and also this is where local taxes were paid to the crown, usually in tobacco. A tradition exists that this was also an area where gunpowder and arms were stored by the British.

== Congregation ==
The early church was formed for the Antrim Parish, which later became the Camden Parish as the counties of Franklin, Pittsylvania, Patrick and Henry were formed from Halifax County.

Camden Parish was formed from Antrim Parish when Pittsylvania County was established in 1767 with 938 white and 316 slave tithables. A tithe paying person was every white or black male (unless a woman had her own business) in the parish, who was required by law to support the local established church.

The early priests were the Reverend Foulis, who resigned in 1759. The Reverend Alex Gordon was next, and then replaced by the Reverend James Stevenson of Williamsburg, Virginia, who took an absence of three months to go to London to be ordained. In March 1771, the Reverend Lewis Gwilliam became the minister of Camden Parish. Although appointed to the Pittsyvania County Committees of safety (American Revolution), he was suspected of Tory loyalties. Gwilliam was paid a salary by the parish through 1779, but in 1776 there were several requests not to pay his salary. Also suspected of disloyalty to the revolution were John Pigg and Samuel Calland (of whom Callands, Virginia was named).

There were some prominent members of the congregation. John Pigg, for whom the Pigg River was named, was a member of the church congregation. So was Colonel William Witcher, a militia officer who led county troops in the Cherokee Expedition in 1776 and 1777, as well as local troops at the Battle of Guilford Courthouse. John Donelson, father in law to President Andrew Jackson, was also a member of the congregation.

Hugh Innes was a judge and represented the county first in the House of Burgesses (1769-1774), the first revolutionary convention (1774), and then in the House of Delegates (1783).

"Once an Anglican church in the Antrim Parish of Halifax County, Virginia Old Chapel Church was later by Primitive Baptists until 2009."

Today the church land and building are privately owned.
