= Daniel M. Ginsberg =

American-Israeli basketball player (born 1993)

Daniel Ginsberg דניאל גינסברג
Personal information
- Nationality: American-Israeli
- Born: New York City, U.S.
- Occupation: Former Basketball player
- Height: 178 cm (5 ft 10 in)
- Weight: 75 kg (165 lb; 11 st 11 lb)

Sport
- Country: Israel
- Position: Point guard
- League: Israeli Basketball Association

Daniel Ginsberg (Hebrew: דניאל גינסברג; born 4 February 1993) is an American-Israeli professional basketball player from New York City.

== Early life ==
Daniel is a Patrick & Henry Community College graduate. He is a former Blue Ridge School basketball player and worked with NBA All-Star Stephon Marbury in Beijing, China.

He established a basketball instruction service upon his return to Charlottesville from playing abroad.

He holds certifications in both fitness coaching and plant-based nutrition.

== Professional career ==
Due to too major injuries, he returned to Charlottesville and founded a basketball training business Utrain.

In 2016–2017 Ginsberg averaged 10.1ppg, 5.3 asst, 3.1 reb and 2.5 steals for the New England Anchors (ABA). In 2017–2018 Ginsberg averaged 11.2ppg, 5.4apg, 4.1rpg for Hapoel Eilat (Israel).
