= Martinsville High School (Virginia) =

Coordinates: 36°41′41.4″N 79°51′41.6″W

Location
- 351 Commonwealth Boulevard; Martinsville, Virginia 24112; United States

Information
- Other names: Martinsville High, MHS, Mavahi
- Former name: The Ruffner Institute (1871–1904)
- School type: Public secondary school
- Opened: 1968; 51 years ago
- Status: Open
- School district: Martinsville City Public Schools
- NCES District ID: 5102400
- Oversight: Virginia Department of Education
- Superintendent: Zeb Talley
- NCES School ID: 510240000988
- Dean: Gerald Kidd
- Principal: Ajamu Dixon
- Grades: 9–12
- Gender: Co-educational
- Enrollment: 593 (2016-17)
- Student to teacher ratio: 11:1
- Hours in school day: 8:25AM-3:30PM
- Campus type: Suburban
- Colors: Red & White
- Athletics conference: Virginia High School League (VHSL); Class 2 Region C Piedmont District
- Sports: baseball, basketball, cheerleading, cross country, football, Golf, softball, swimming, soccer, scholastic bowl, tennis, track, volleyball, wrestling
- Mascot: Lugnut the Bulldog
- Nickname: Bulldogs
- Team name: Martinsville Bulldogs & Lady Bulldogs
- Rival: Bassett High School; Magna Vista High School
- Yearbook: Martinsville
- Feeder schools: Martinsville Middle School
- Website: Official Site

Martinsville High School is a four-year public secondary school located in Martinsville, Virginia, United States. It is the only high school in the Martinsville City Public School system.

== History ==
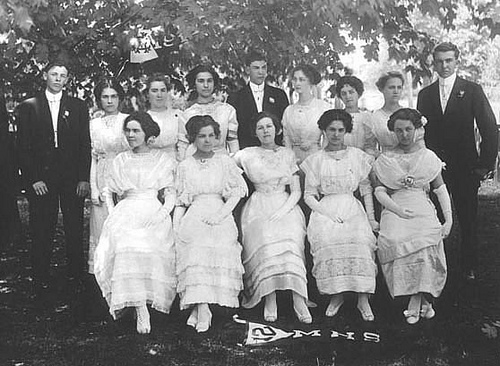
Graduating class of Martinsville High School, Martinsville, Virginia. 1912.

The second Martinsville High School building was completed in 1939 on Cleveland Avenue, and it was used until the newer building was completed in the late 1960s. The last graduating class at the older building was in 1968.

Margaret Shumate Hadden, class of 1941, often spoke about her days there at the older building. "In high school I took the regular courses, English, history, math, Latin, home economics, chemistry and many other subjects."

One notable feature of the second high school building was a large tube-shaped fire escape, that had an enclosed circular and spiral slide inside. During fire drills, students in the upper floors would climb in and then slide down to the bottom exit. The fire escape was also used in numerous student challenges and pranks.

The original high school building in Martinsville was started in 1871. Dr. Ruffner was the first superintendent of schools in Henry County, and the first high school was named in his honor as "The Ruffner Institute", until 1904, when the school was re-named "Martinsville High School". The 1900 graduating class were called "Mavahi", short for "Martinsville High School".

Rev. Albert Harris, a Methodist minister, was influential in establishing a segregated high school for black students in Martinsville in 1917. The high school, known as the Martinsville Training School, became a Rosenwald School in 1920 when a philanthropic grant from Julius Rosenwald was matched by local property taxes and donations from the African Americans community. In 1945 the school was renamed in honor of the Rev. Albert Harris. "In 1958 the original building was demolished and replaced by the Albert Harris High School. When the Martinsville schools integrated in 1968, the former high school building became an elementary school.

"My teaching career began in August of 1948 at Albert Harris High School in the City of Martinsville teaching Health and Physical Education to both boys and girls, believe it or not, during that first year. Also, I headed teams in coaching football, basketball for boys and girls for two years, baseball during the entire period, and teaching driver education to students and adults. In 1959 I received a Master's Degree in Administration from Springfield College in Springfield, Massachusetts. From 1964 to 1968 I was the assistant principal at Albert Harris High School. 1968 to 1974 I was assistant principal at Martinsville Junior High School. 1974 through 1980 I was principal at Martinsville High School, retired with 16 years in the classroom and 16 years in high school administration."

In 2013, Martinsville high completed a $9 million renovation to build TV studios, 21st century science labs, a mock hospital room, and a remodeled cafeteria.

In September 2017, the school was involved in a $9 million dollar lawsuit and sued by its former school principal.

== Academics ==
Martinsville offers programs such as Piedmont Governor's School for Mathematics, Science, and Technology, Advanced Placement, and Dual Enrollment classes. During the 2006–2007 school year, a joint program, with the assistance of Patrick & Henry Community College, allowed a select group of juniors and seniors an opportunity to earn their associate degrees (64 college hours) before graduation.

In order to graduate, Martinsville High school students are required to complete at least 40 hours of volunteer community service by the end of their senior year.

== Athletics ==
Martinsville offers a comprehensive athletic program and participates in the Virginia High School League's interscholastic sports competing in the Piedmont District. Sports offered include basketball, baseball, cross country, football, golf, softball, scholastic bowl, swimming, tennis, track, volleyball, and wrestling. Other extracurricular activities include robotics, interact club, chess club, marching band, gospel choir, health occupations students of america (HOSA), and future business leaders of america (FBLA). The MHS Boys' Basketball won back to back VHSL State Championships in 2015 and 2016. Competing in the Piedmont District, Martinsville men's basketball has won 15 Virginia High School League state championships, more than any other school in Virginia. Martinsville is expected to leave the Piedmont District and join the Three Rivers District in 2025.

== Students and faculty ==
The students are 55% African-American, 20% White, 16% Hispanic and 6% two or more races. As of 2024, the student-teacher ratio is 14:1.

== Notable alumni ==
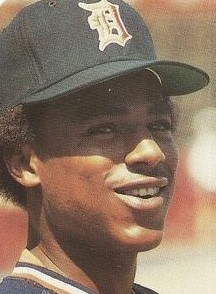
Lou Whitaker

- William Fields Carter (1908–1999) – member of the Virginia House of Delegates
- Carl Hairston (class of 1970) – former NFL player, Super Bowl champion
- Hodgetwins (class of 1992) – comedians Keith and Kevin Hodge
- George Hairston Jamerson — brigadier general during World War I
- Shawn Moore (class of 1986) — former professional football player
- Alison Parker (class of 2009) — former journalist and news reporter for WDBJ
- Jesse Penn — former football player for Dallas Cowboys
- Sonny Wade (class of 1965) — football player, inducted into the Virginia Sports Hall of Fame
- Lou Whitaker (class of 1975) — former MLB player, Detroit Tigers, 1984 World Series champion

== Bibliography ==
- Caldwell, Claudia Boyden. A Comparative Study of the Kindergarten and Non-Kindergarten Children of the Albert Harris School Through the Years of 1949-53 in Martinsville, Virginia. 1954.
- Cole, Richard M. A Study of the Recreational Activities of Students of the Albert Harris High School, Martinsville, Virginia. 1951.
- Fayette Area Historical Initiative, and Virginia Foundation for the Humanities. Fayette Street: A Hundred-Year History of African American Life in Martinsville, Virginia, 1905-2005. Martinsville, Va: FAHI, 2006.
- Martinsville High School (Martinsville, Va.). Mavahi. Martinsville, Va: Graduating Class of the Martinsville High School, 1900.
- Turner, Joseph Elmer. A Study of Pupils Completing the Elementary Grades at the Albert Harris School, Martinsville, Virginia Who Failed to Enter High School. 1947.
- Dedication Ceremony for Albert Harris High School, a New Segregated School for Black Students, in Martinsville, Va. 1959. The WSLS-TV News Film Collection, 1951-1971, comprises anchor scripts and 16mm news film created by Roanoke, Va., television station WSLS. A grant from the National Endowment for the Humanities funded the preservation and digitization of this collection.
