= Jesse Penn =

American football player (born 1962)

No. 59
- Position: Linebacker

Personal information
- Born: September 6, 1962 (age 64); Martinsville, Virginia, U.S.
- Listed height: 6 ft 3 in (1.91 m)
- Listed weight: 218 lb (99 kg)

Career information
- High school: Martinsville
- College: Virginia Tech
- NFL draft: 1985: 2nd round, 44th overall pick

Career history
- Dallas Cowboys (1985–1987)

Career NFL statistics
- Sacks: 2.5
- Fumble recoveries: 5
- Interceptions: 1
- Stats at Pro Football Reference

Jesse Andrew Penn II (born September 6, 1962) is an American former professional football player who was a linebacker for the Dallas Cowboys of the National Football League (NFL). He played college football for the Virginia Tech Hokies. and was selected by the Dallas Cowboys in the second round of the 1985 NFL draft.

== Early life and college ==
Penn attended Martinsville High School, where he practiced football and track. He accepted a football scholarship from Virginia Tech.

As a junior, he was named a starter at standup defensive end, becoming one of the leaders on defense, while playing on the same defensive line as future hall of famer Bruce Smith. He posted 70 tackles (fourth on the team), 39 solo tackles, 3 tackles for loss, 3 sacks, 3 interceptions, 9 passes defensed.

As a senior, he registered 65 tackles (fifth on the team), 35 solo tackles, 5 tackles for loss, 2 sacks, 5 interceptions (second on the team), 8 passes defensed (second on the team) and 2 fumble recoveries. He also participated in the Blue–Gray Football Classic. His 8 career interceptions were a school record for defensive linemen. * Second-team All-South Independent (1984)

== Professional career ==
Penn was selected by the Dallas Cowboys in the second round (44th overall) of the 1985 NFL draft, to play as an outside linebacker. He also was selected fifth overall in the 1985 USFL draft. As a rookie, he was a backup behind Jeff Rohrer. In the preseason against the Green Bay Packers, he returned an interception for a 77-yard touchdown. He started against the Cincinnati Bengals in place of an injured Rohrer, making 5 tackles and returned a blocked punt 49 yards for a touchdown.

In 1987, he started in place of an injured Rohrer against the Detroit Lions, tallying 6 tackles, one forced fumble and 2 fumble recoveries. He finished the season with 2.5 sacks.

In the 1988 offseason he was diagnosed with a degenerative spinal condition, that forced him to retire.
