= Mountain Road Historic District =

Historic district in Virginia, United States

- U.S. National Register of Historic Places
- U.S. Historic district
- Virginia Landmarks Register
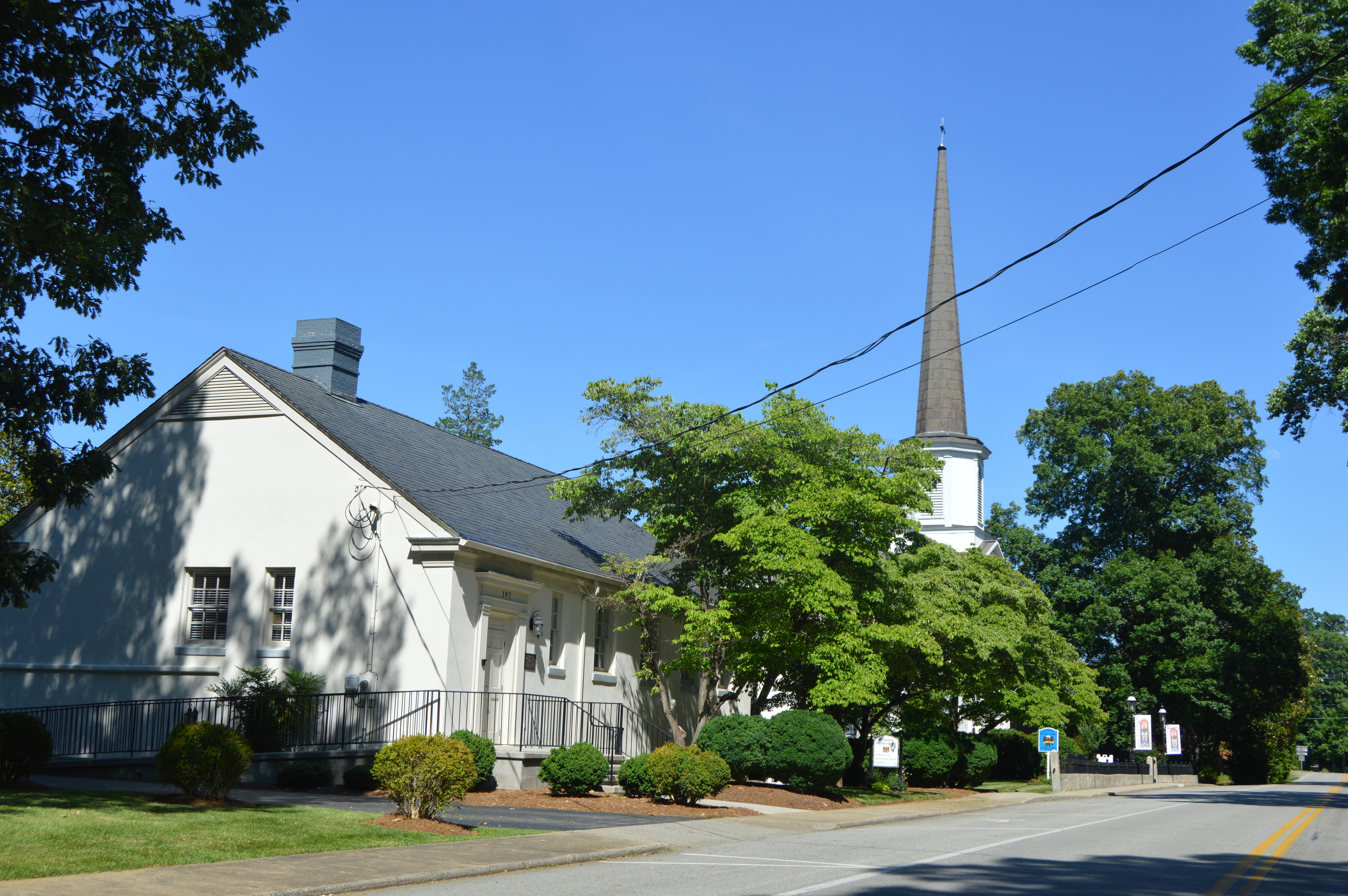
- St. John's Church and parish hall

- Location within Virginia Location within the United States
- Location: Roughly Mountain Rd. from Mimosa Dr. to Academy St., Halifax, Virginia
- Coordinates: 36°45′59″N 78°56′07″W
- Area: 67 acres (27 ha)
- Architect: Multiple
- Architectural style: Colonial Revival, Late Victorian
- NRHP reference No.: 83004245
- VLR No.: 230-0078

Significant dates
- Added to NRHP: October 6, 1983
- Designated VLR: August 16, 1983

Mountain Road Historic District is a national historic district in Halifax, Halifax County, Virginia. The district includes 22 contributing buildings located along Mountain Road (State Route 360) and consists of two churches, a parish hall, a masonic hall, and a host of private residences dating to the 19th and early 20th centuries. Notable buildings include the Masonic Lodge (1828), Methodist Church (1831), St. John's Episcopal Church (1844), Magnolia Hill, Grand Oaks, and St. John's Rectory. Several of the earlier dwellings and St. John's Episcopal Church were designed by Dabney Cosby, Jr., son of the Jeffersonian workman, Dabney Cosby, Sr.

It was listed on the National Register of Historic Places in 1983.
