= Virginia State Route 360 =

State highway in Virginia, United States

State Route 360

Route information
- Maintained by VDOT
- Length: 41.77 mi (67.22 km)
- Existed: 1982–present
- Tourist routes: Virginia Byway

Major junctions
- West end: US 360 / US 58 Bus. / SR 293 in Danville
- SR 41 near Danville; SR 57 at Mountain Road; US 501 in Halifax
- East end: US 360 / SR 344 near Scottsburg

Location
- Country: United States
- State: Virginia
- Counties: City of Danville, Pittsylvania, Halifax

Highway system
- Virginia Routes; Interstate; US; Primary; Secondary; Byways; History; HOT lanes
← US 360	→ SR 361

State Route 360 (SR 360) is a primary state highway in the U.S. state of Virginia. The state highway runs 41.77 miles (67.22 km) from U.S. Route 360, US 58 Business, and SR 293 in Danville east to US 360 and SR 344 near Scottsburg. SR 360 is the old alignment of US 360 through Danville, eastern Pittsylvania County, and Halifax County, including the latter's county seat of Halifax, before the U.S. Highway was moved to its present course mostly concurrent with US 58 via South Boston.

== Route description ==
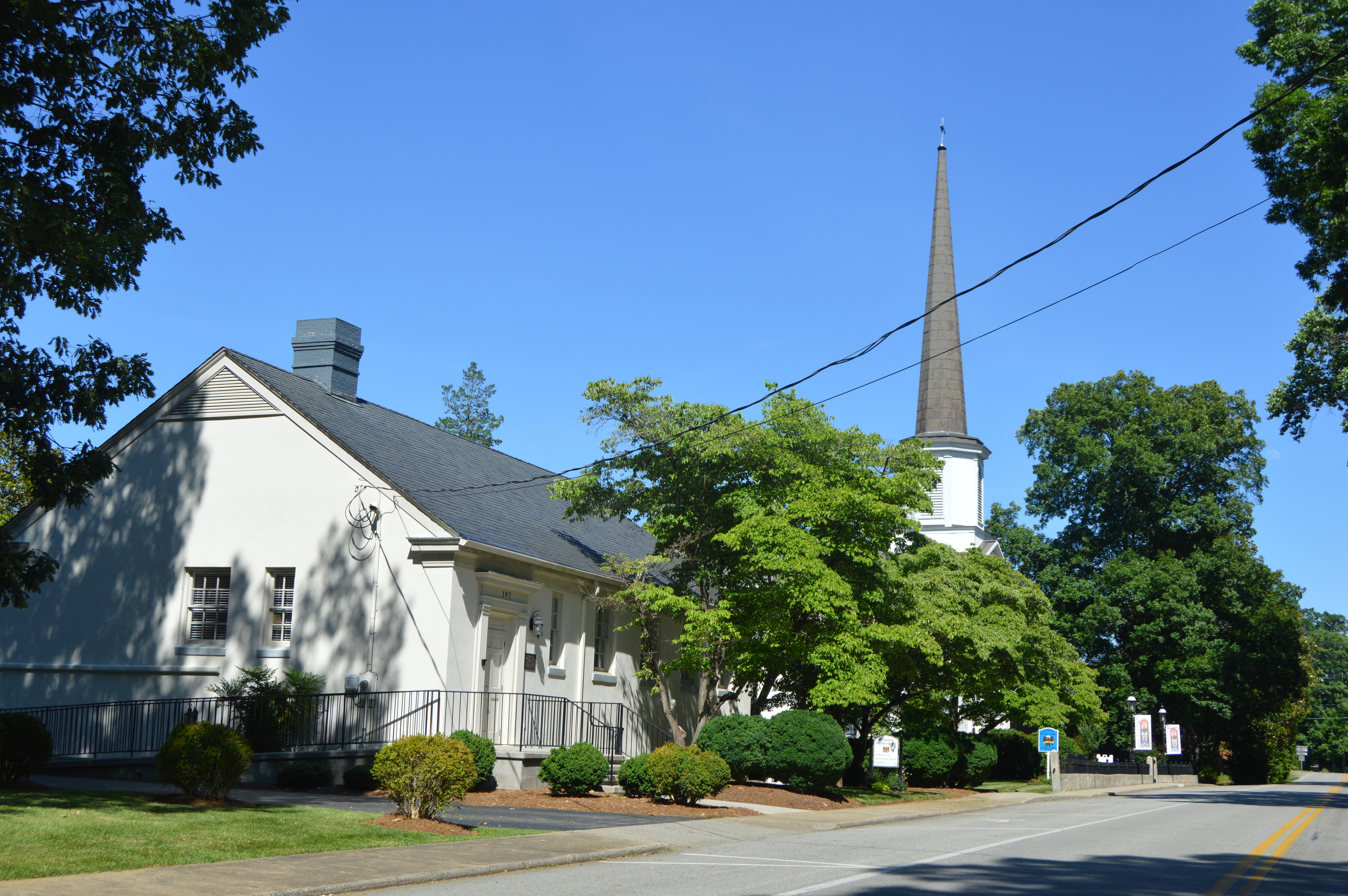
SR 360 as Mountain Road in Halifax

SR 360 begins at a four-way intersection with US 58 Business, US 360, and SR 293 just north of the Dan River and downtown Danville. US 58 Business heads west as Riverside Drive toward Martinsville and east on River Street concurrent toward South Boston with US 360, which also has its western terminus at this intersection. SR 293 heads south across the river as Main Street and runs concurrently with SR 360 on two-lane undivided North Main Street. The two highways diverse a short distance to the north, with SR 293 continuing along North Main Street and SR 360 heading northeast along Richmond Boulevard. The state highway becomes Old Richmond Road on exiting the independent city of Danville and entering Pittsylvania County. SR 360 crosses over Fall Creek and Norfolk Southern Railway's Danville District. The state highway crosses over US 29 (Danville Expressway) and has an intersection with SR 41, which provides access to a partial cloverleaf interchange with the U.S. Highway to Lynchburg and Greensboro. SR 360 gradually curves to the east after passing through the hamlets of Beaver Park, Keeling, and Red Oak Hollow in eastern Pittsylvania County.

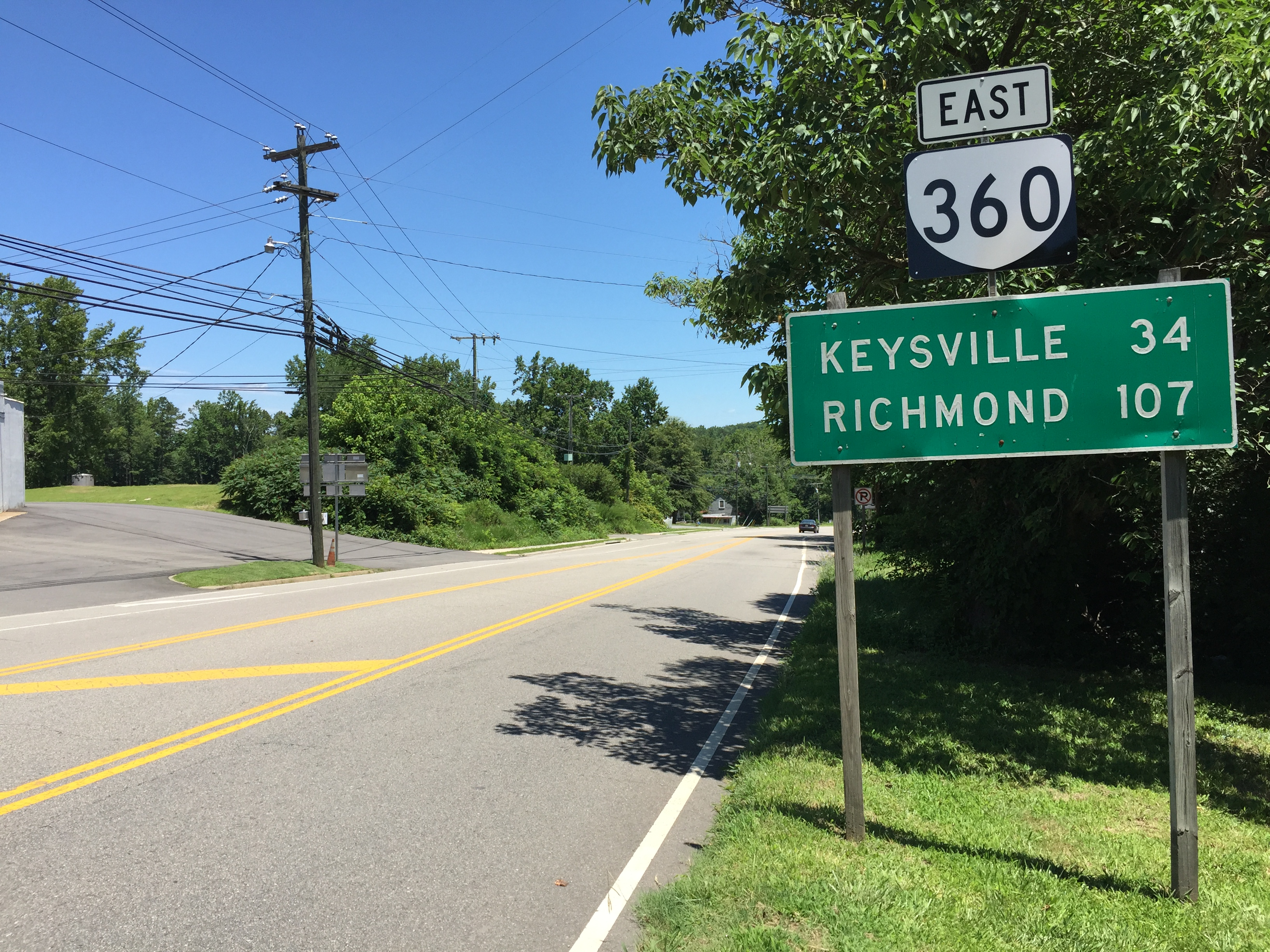
View east along SR 360 at US 501 departing Halifax

SR 360 becomes Mountain Road as it enters Halifax County, where it passes through Vernon Hill and Mountain Road, the site of its junction with SR 57 (Chatham Road). East of Mountain Road, the highway enters the town of Halifax. SR 360 intersects SR 349 (Edmunds Boulevard), a very short route on two sides of the Halifax County courthouse, before intersecting US 501 (Main Street). The two highways head northeast together to the northern town limit, where US 501 splits northwest toward Lynchburg as L.P. Bailey Memorial Highway and SR 360 heads east as Bethel Road, which crosses the Banister River a short distance south of its impoundment, Banister Lake. The state highway reaches its eastern terminus at a four-way intersection with US 360 (James D. Hagood Highway) and SR 344 (Scottsburg Road) west of Scottsburg. SR 344 heads east through the town of Scottsburg to its end in Staunton River State Park at the confluence of the Roanoke River (also known as the Staunton River) and the Dan River.

== Major intersections ==
County	Location	mi	km	Destinations	Notes
City of Danville		0.00	0.00	US 58 Bus. / US 360 east (River Street / Riverside Drive) / SR 293 south (Main Street)	Western terminus of SR 360; western terminus of US 360; western end of SR 293 concurrency
City of Danville		0.70	1.13	SR 293 north (North Main Street)	east end of SR 293 overlap
Pittsylvania		2.42	3.89	SR 41 north (Franklin Turnpike) to US 29 – Lynchburg	Southern terminus of SR 41
Halifax	Mountain Road	31.02	49.92	SR 57 west (Chatham Road) – Chatham	Eastern terminus of SR 57
Halifax	Halifax			SR 349 south (Edmunds Boulevard)	Northern terminus of SR 349
Halifax	Halifax	34.54	55.59	US 501 south (South Main Street) – South Boston	Western end of US 501 concurrency
Halifax	Halifax	35.32	56.84	US 501 north (L.P. Bailey Highway) – Lynchburg	Eastern end of US 501 concurrency
Halifax	Scottsburg	41.77	67.22	US 360 (James D. Hagood Highway) / SR 344 east (Scottsburg Road)	Eastern terminus of SR 360; western terminus of SR 344
1.000 mi = 1.609 km; 1.000 km = 0.621 mi: Concurrency terminus
