= R.L. Stone House =

Historic house in Virginia, United States

- U.S. National Register of Historic Places
- Virginia Landmarks Register
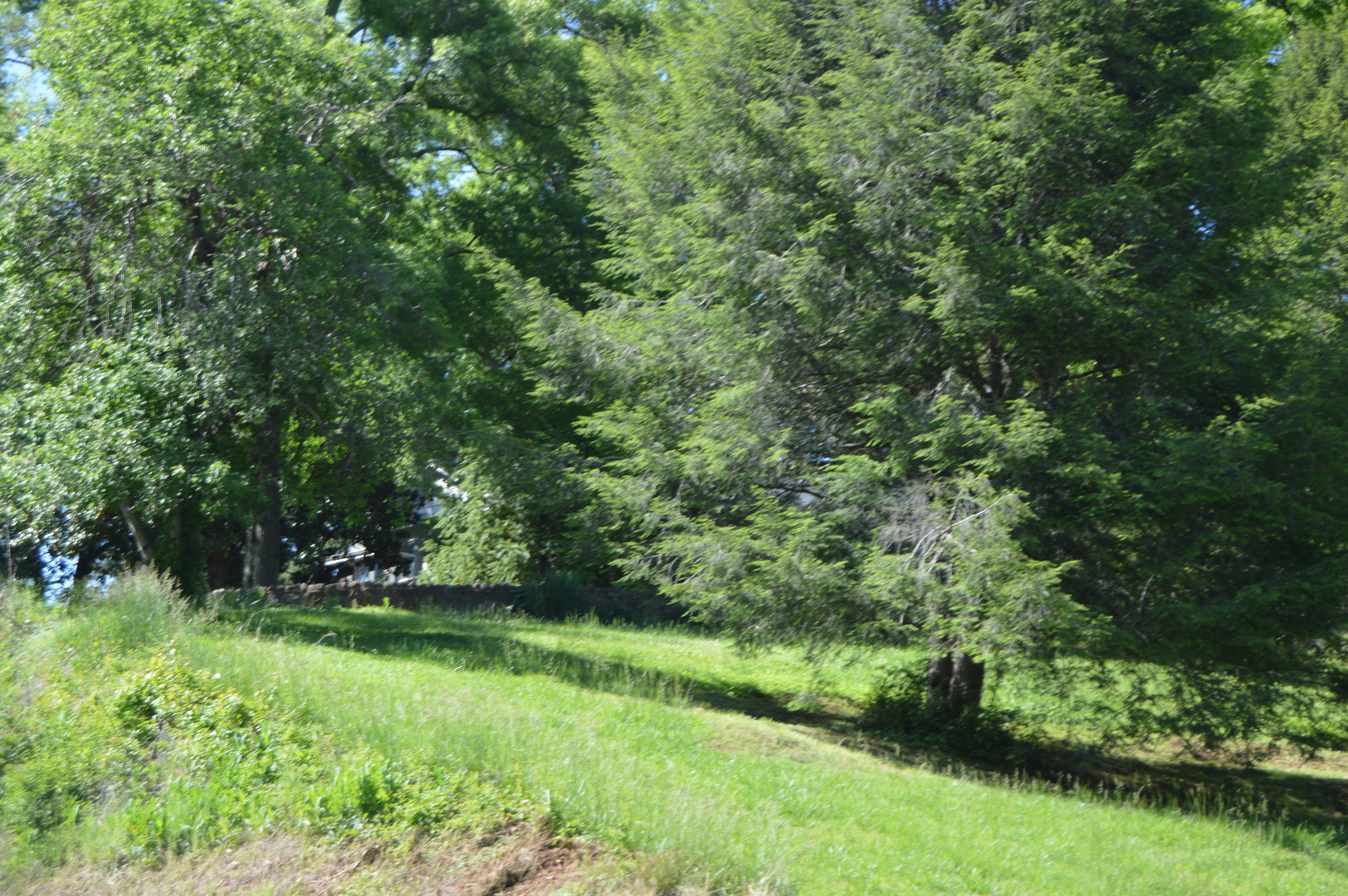
- Entrance to the property, and wall

- Location within Virginia Location within the United States
- Location: 3136 Fairystone Park Hwy., Bassett, Virginia
- Coordinates: 36°45′27″N 79°59′5″W
- Area: 2.9 acres (1.2 ha)
- Built: 1930-1938
- Architectural style: Classical Revival
- NRHP reference No.: 06000708
- VLR No.: 044-5174

Significant dates
- Added to NRHP: August 16, 2006
- Designated VLR: June 8, 2006

R.L. Stone House, also known as Ithaca, is a historic estate located near Bassett, Henry County, Virginia. It was built between 1930 and 1938, and is a two-story, brick dwelling in the Classical Revival style. It sits on a full raised basement and has a slate-covered hipped roof. Also on the property are a contributing garage and workshop, stable, and water pump.

It was listed on the National Register of Historic Places in 2006.
