= Callands, Virginia =

Unincorporated community in Virginia, US

- Unincorporated Community
- Callands
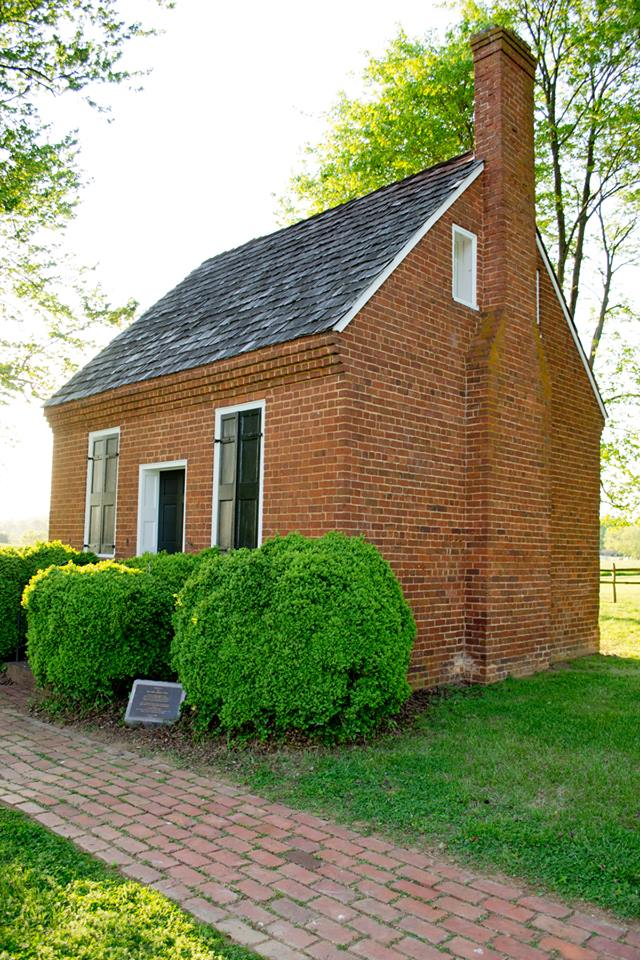
- 18th Century Callands Clerk Office

- Location in Virginia Location in the United States
- Coordinates: 36°49′13″N 79°35′12″W
- Country: United States
- State: Virginia
- County: Pittsylvania
- Named for: Samuel Calland

Callands is an unincorporated community in Pittsylvania County, in the U.S. state of Virginia. It was named after Samuel Calland, a native of Scotland who immigrated during the 18th century, whose general store became a popular fixture of the community. The area around the store served as the county seat of Pittsylvania County until the end of 1776.

Before the American Revolution, Callands was also the seat of the Antrim Parish, which later became the Camden Parish, of the Virginia colony's established church, the Church of England. The parish priest lived here, and traveled to other churches of the parish in rotation, including the Old Chapel Church in Penhook.

"The larger building, on the other side of present-day VA 969, appears (by its exterior and interior design, and by local tradition) to be the courthouse, constructed during 1772 by Roberts after five years' procrastination, but incomplete records of Roberts' tumultuous business and public dealings make it difficult to identify the building for certain as the courthouse structure. By 1777 the court had been moved to present-day Chatham, and by 1788 the large brick building had come into the ownership of James Smith and Samuel Calland. By 1792 Calland was sole owner, and in subsequent years his store and post office in this building gave the community the name used to this day."

The Callands Festival (Autumn Potpourri Festival) was once held there on the first Saturday of each October but has been in hiatus since 2019. In recent years, the Callands Fire Department has been holding a festival nearby.

== Notable people ==
- Andrew S. Doss, noted historian
