= Samuel Calland =

American landowner and merchant (1750–1808)

Samuel Calland (1750 – Nov. 8, 1808, Callands, Virginia) was born in Scotland, but became an influential landowner and merchant in Colonial Virginia. The town of Callands, Virginia, is named for him.

== Personal life ==
Born in 1750, Samuel married Elizabeth Smith Calland (1758–1828) on December 14, 1776, in Pittsylvania County, Virginia. She was the daughter of John Smith, who owned the large plantation "The Pocket", in a bend of the Smith River. Their children were: Anna B. Calland Callaway (1780–1810); Captain Samuel C. Calland (1787–1818); Ralph Smith Calland (1789–1815); and James Calland (1791–1817).

== Home ==
The Calland family home had 22 rooms and was situated at the foot of the Turkeycock Mountain.

All that remains of the large Calland home is a story and a half, six-room structure with earthen basement. Still prominent is the high ceiling in the main room, pine wainscoting, a corner staircase leading to an upstairs bedroom and the tall brick chimney.

== Business ==
As a merchant, Calland's store sold not only the frontier necessities of the period, but also imported elegant and expensive items for the tastes of prosperous landowners in the area. His store was also used as the local courthouse and meeting place of early Pittsylvania County.

== Church ==
Samuel Calland was a strict Presbyterian, and established the first Presbyterian church in Pittsylvania County, the "Wet Sleeve" congregation. This was organized soon after the revolution, when freedom of religion was instituted in Virginia.

The first Presbyterian church established in the county was named Wet Sleeve for a nearby stream, and stood near Callands. When Samuel Calland opened his store at the courthouse, he became a strong influence for the church, being a Scotchman. In 1784 a congregation was organized and the Wet Sleeve Church built. The Reverend David Barr was called to be the first minister, and marrying a young lady of the neighborhood, Mary Fulton, established his home on Sandy River. After a few years Mr. Barr moved to North Carolina and sold his properties here. With no resident pastor the church languished.

== Public office ==
Early in the American Revolution, Samuel Calland remained loyal to the King. He was brought to court in Pittsylvania County for continuing to drink tea after the Boston Tea Party. However, he quickly turned his allegiance to the new Commonwealth of Virginia, and took the Oath of Aliegance to the United States in 1778. Samuel Calland was first appointed to a justice of Pittsylvania County, Virginia. He was later appointed to become the High sheriff of Pittsylvania County, Virginia after the American Revolution.

== Death and burial ==
He died in 1808, and his published obituary summed up his life thus:

...that he was a man formed for the enjoyment of happiness, as a husband he was affectionate, as a father kind, as a master indulgent, as a friend warm. His hospitality was proverbial.

After his death, his lands were divided among his children into four plantations: the "Manor Plantation"; the "Glebe Plantation"; the "Dan River Plantation" fronting the Dan River and the "Sandy River Plantation", fronting the Sandy River.
