= Mountain Road, Virginia =

- Census-designated place
- Location within Virginia Location within the United States
- Coordinates: 36°45′34″N 78°59′13″W
- Country: United States
- State: Virginia
- County: Halifax

Area
  - Total: 8.6 sq mi (22.3 km^{2})
  - Land: 8.6 sq mi (22.2 km^{2})
  - Water: 0.039 sq mi (0.1 km^{2})
- Elevation: 533 ft (162 m)

Population (2010)
  - Total: 1,100
  - Density: 128/sq mi (49.5/km^{2})
- Time zone: UTC−5 (Eastern (EST))
  - Summer (DST): UTC−4 (EDT)
- ZIP codes: 24558, 24592
- FIPS code: 51-53584
- GNIS feature ID: 2584885

Mountain Road is a census-designated place (CDP) in Halifax County, Virginia, United States. As of the 2020 census, Mountain Road had a population of 1,009.

== Geography ==
The CDP is an area along Virginia Route 360 (Mountain Road) in central Halifax County. It is bordered to the east by the town of Halifax, the county seat. According to the U.S. Census Bureau, the CDP has a total area of 8.6 square miles (22.3 km^{2}), of which 0.04 square miles (0.1 km^{2}), or 0.41%, are water.

== Demographics ==
Historical population
Census	Pop.	Note	%±
2010	1,100		—
2020	1,009		−8.3%
U.S. Decennial Census; 2010 2020

Mountain Road was first listed as a census designated place in the 2010 U.S. census.
