= Bassett, Virginia =

- CDP
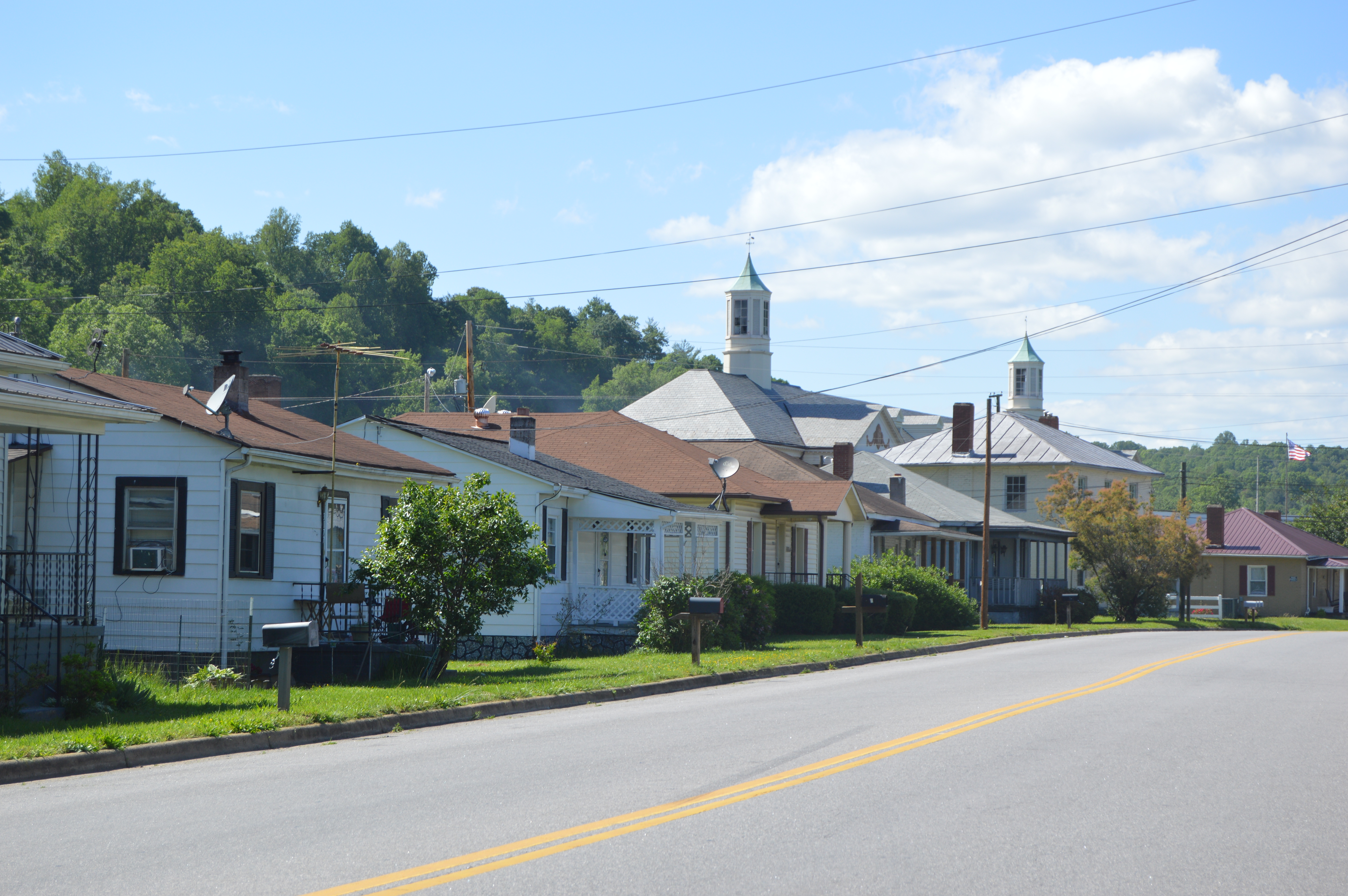
- Fairystone Park Highway; John D. Bassett High School in the background

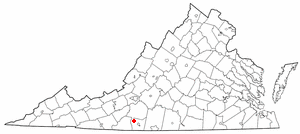
- Location of Bassett, Virginia
- Coordinates: 36°45′36″N 79°59′12″W
- Country: United States
- State: Virginia
- County: Henry

Area
  - Total: 3.5 sq mi (9.1 km^{2})
  - Land: 3.5 sq mi (9.1 km^{2})
  - Water: 0 sq mi (0.0 km^{2})
- Elevation: 774 ft (236 m)

Population (2010)
  - Total: 1,100
- Time zone: UTC−5 (Eastern (EST))
  - Summer (DST): UTC−4 (EDT)
- ZIP code: 24055
- Area code: 276
- FIPS code: 51-04872
- GNIS feature ID: 1488909

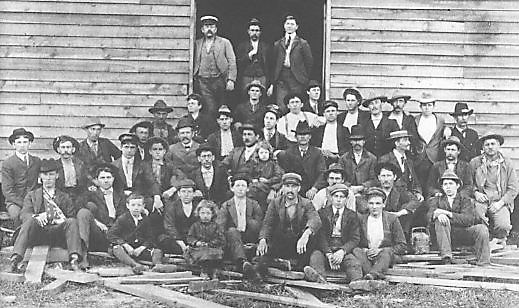
Early employees of Bassett Furniture Company, Bassett, circa 1900

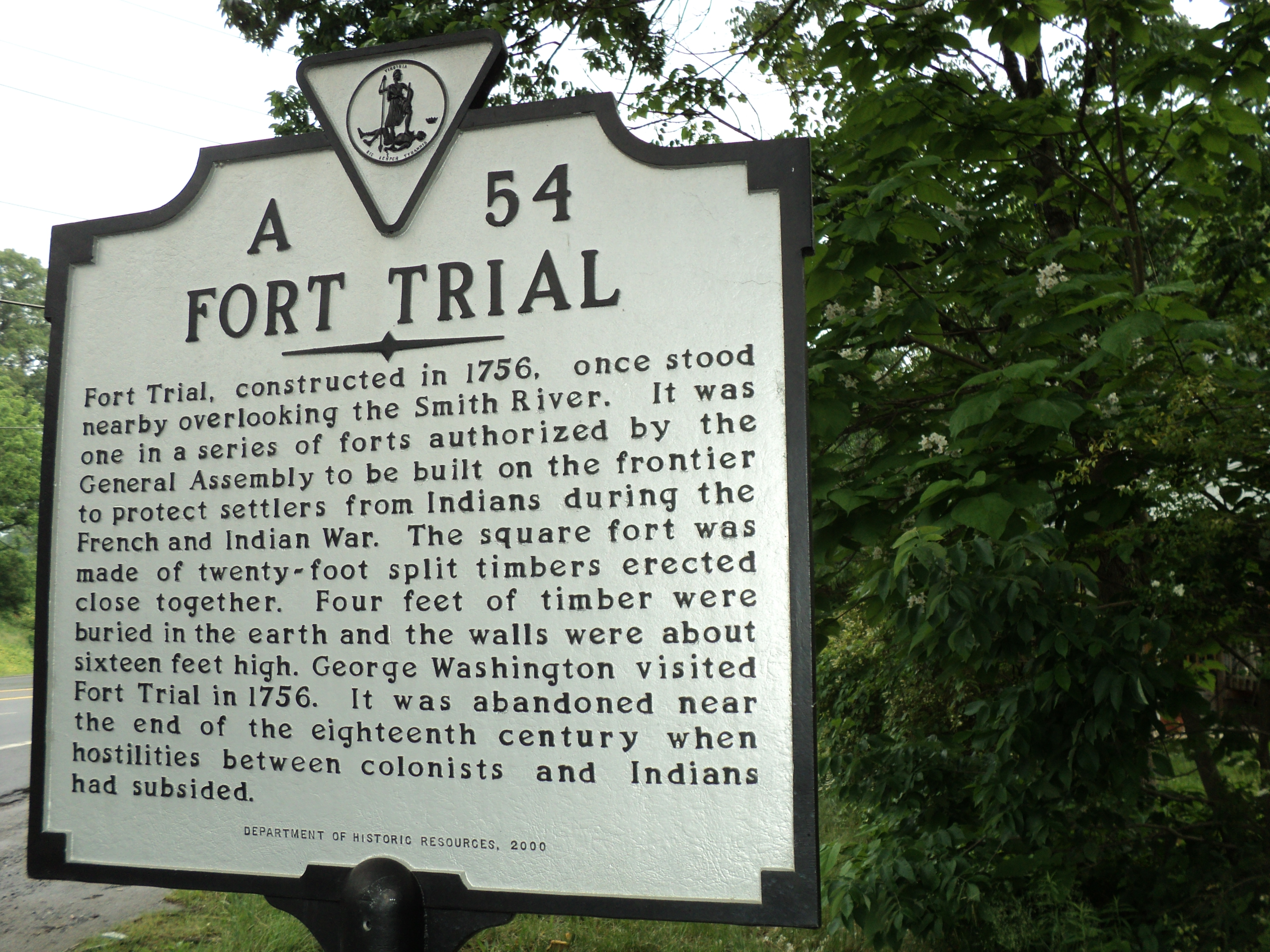
Virginia state historical marker for Fort Trial, built in 1756 near present-day Bassett

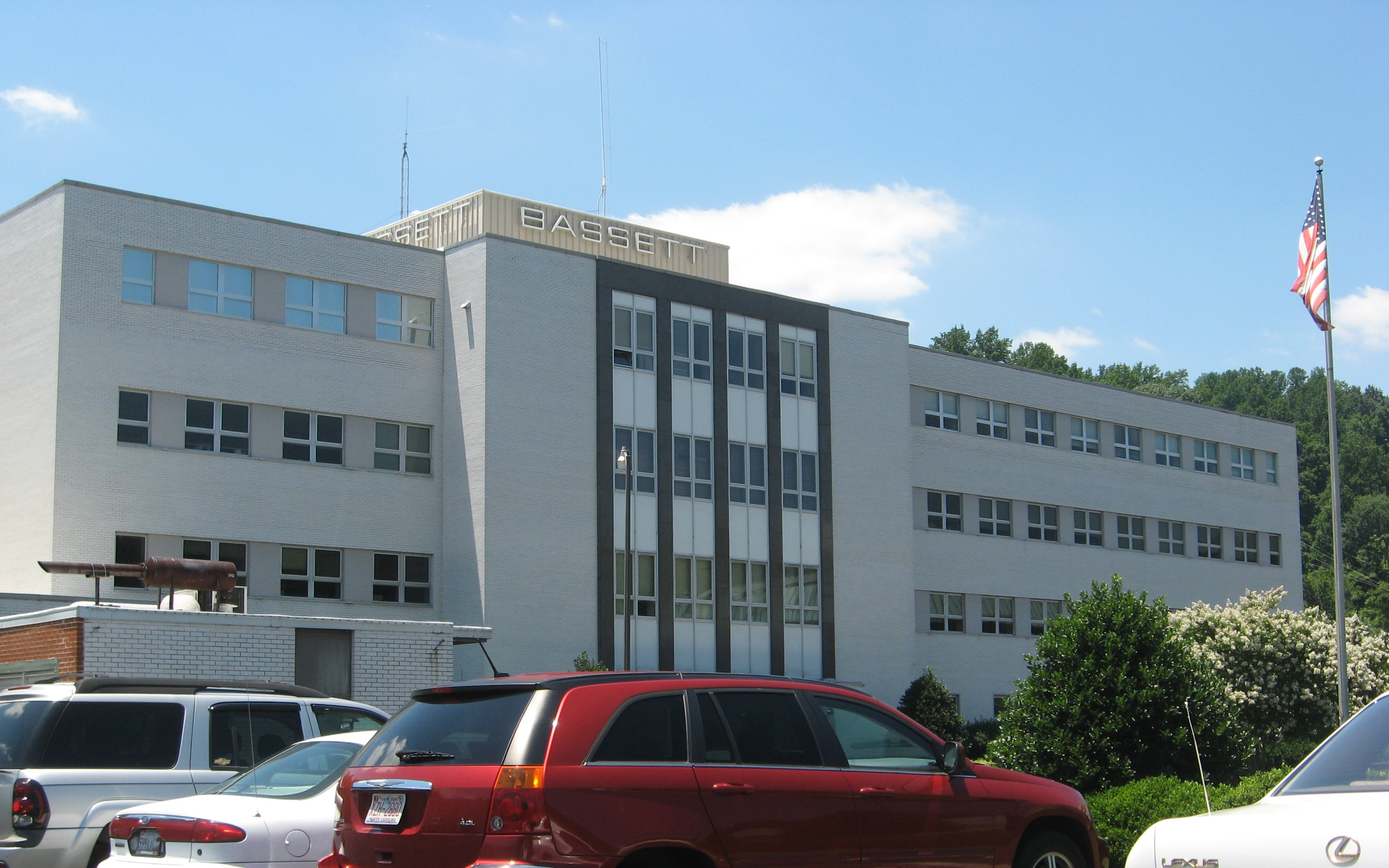
Bassett World Headquarters

Bassett is a census-designated place (CDP) in Henry County, Virginia, United States. As of the 2020 census, Bassett had a population of 1,028. It is part of the Martinsville micropolitan area. The town was founded along a rail line by the same family that later started Bassett Furniture. Bassett Furniture's headquarters have remained in Bassett since it began in 1902.

== History ==
The John D. Bassett High School, Eltham Manor, and R.L. Stone House are listed on the National Register of Historic Places.

The town of Bassett was originally part of Horsepasture, Virginia. After John D. Bassett started a general store on his family's land, the population started to grow around it and eventually his store incorporated a postal service. When the federal post office regulators asked John D. Bassett what they should call the area, he said "Well, how about Bassetts"? The "S" at the end was later dropped.

The train depot in Bassett was originally a combination station and had three trains a day picking up products from the company and providing railcar service to passengers. Its last passenger pickup was on February 18, 1961. Today it is used as a seasonal community market.

The Bassett Historical Center is located in the town. "The Bassett Historical Center is the repository for all genealogical research and local history for the counties of Henry and Patrick County, Virginia and the City of Martinsville, Virginia." Now operates as part of the Blue Ridge Regional Library. "Henry County is one of the seven counties in Virginia that has a Cohabitation List. Slaves were not permitted to marry legally but did have families, with the counties keeping records of which slaves were cohabitating. Also available is the "Afro-American Marriages of Henry County, Virginia", by Harris and Millner, which would be helpful to find an ancestor dating back to the early or mid-1800s."

== Geography ==
Bassett is located at 36°45′36″N 79°59′12″W (36.759905, −79.986763).

According to the United States Census Bureau, the CDP has a total area of 3.5 square miles (9.1 km^{2}), all land.

Bassett is located along the Smith River (Virginia), which flooded in 1937. "Flood of Oct. 19, 1937, reached a stage of about 22.9 ft, from information by local residents, discharge, 38,000 ft³/s, from rating curve extended above 23,000 ft³/s on basis of backwater studies and records for station at Martinsville." Since August 1950, the water flow of the river in Bassett has been regulated by the Philpott Dam, 6.2 miles upstream.

== Demographics ==
Historical population
Census	Pop.	Note	%±
1950	3,421		—
1960	3,148		−8.0%
1970	3,058		−2.9%
1980	2,034		−33.5%
1990	1,579		−22.4%
2000	1,338		−15.3%
2010	1,100		−17.8%
U.S. Decennial Census; 1940 1950 1960 1970; 1980 1990 2000; 2010

The community was first listed as an unincorprated community under the name Bassetts in the 1950 U.S. census. The name was changed to Bassett for the 1970 U.S. census It was listed as a census designated place in the 1980 U.S. census.

As of the census of 2000, there were 1,338 people, 530 households, and 338 families residing in the CDP. The population density was 379.5 people per square mile (146.3/km^{2}). There were 601 housing units at an average density of 170.5/sq mi (65.7/km^{2}). The racial makeup of the CDP was 72.94% White, 24.14% African American, 0.07% Asian, 0.07% Pacific Islander, 1.79% from other races, and 0.97% from two or more races. Hispanic or Latino of any race were 4.93% of the population.

There were 530 households, out of which 22.6% had children under the age of 18 living with them, 43.4% were married couples living together, 13.8% had a female householder with no husband present, and 36.2% were non-families. 32.8% of all households were made up of individuals, and 18.7% had someone living alone who was 65 years of age or older. The average household size was 2.33 and the average family size was 2.93.

In the CDP, the population was spread out, with 18.2% under the age of 18, 6.9% from 18 to 24, 24.1% from 25 to 44, 25.0% from 45 to 64, and 25.8% who were 65 years of age or older. The median age was 46 years. For every 100 females there were 92.0 males. For every 100 females age 18 and over, there were 88.6 males.

The median income for a household in the CDP was $28,359, and the median income for a family was $34,940. Males had a median income of $23,125 versus $17,868 for females. The per capita income for the CDP was $17,651. About 13.3% of families and 17.8% of the population were below the poverty line, including 26.2% of those under age 18 and 15.2% of those age 65 or over.

== Education ==
- Bassett High School

== Climate ==
The climate in this area is characterized by hot, humid summers and generally mild to cool winters. According to the Köppen climate classification system, Bassett has a humid subtropical climate, abbreviated "Cfa" on climate maps.

== Points of interest ==
- Philpott Dam and lake
- Historic John D. Bassett High School and venue

== Notable people ==
- John E. Tinsley — country bluesman known for "Keep Your Hands Off Her" and "Trouble Blues"
- Ward Armstrong – former minority leader of the Virginia House of Delegates
- John D. Bassett – primary founder of Bassett Furniture Company
- Sherman Dillard – former American basketball player and coach
- Michael C. Maxey – former president of Roanoke College
- A. L. Philpott – former Speaker of the House of Virginia Delegates
- Harry M. Philpott – former president of Auburn University
- Harvey Cloyd Philpott – American businessman and 24th Lieutenant Governor of North Carolina
- Philip C. Stone – former president of Bridgewater College and Sweet Briar College

== Bibliography ==
- Fussell, Fred C. (2003). Blue Ridge Music Trails: Finding a Place in the Circle. North Carolina Folklife Institute. 080785459X.
- Henika, W.S., 1971, Geology of the Bassett quadrangle, Virginia: Virginia Division of Mineral Resources, Report of Investigations 26, scale 1:24,000.
