= Henry County Public Schools =

School division in Collinsville, Virginia, United States

Address
- 3300 Kings Mountain Road Collinsvile, Virginia, 24078; United States

District information
- Type: Public school division
- Grades: Pre-K–12
- Established: 1870; 156 years ago
- Superintendent: Dr. Amy Blake-Lewis
- Schools: 13
- NCES District ID: 5101920

Students and staff
- Enrollment: 6,916 (2024–25)
- Teachers: 489.84 (on an FTE basis)
- Staff: 1,670
- Student–teacher ratio: 14.12

Other information
- Website: www.henry.k12.va.us

Henry County Public Schools operates 14 schools—two high schools, two middle schools, and ten elementary schools—a community learning center, and a regional alternative program. HCPS operates preschool programs at ten elementary schools.

== History ==
According to a thesis written by Eugene Carol Hoover in 1939, a Dr. J.M. Smith, who was superintendent of the county schools from 1876 to 1885, wrote a history of education in the county. He said that prior to 1850, Henry County had virtually no school history worth reporting. From 1846 to 1851, there was a brief experiment in Henry County with district free schools, which led to a violent political upheaval and culminated in abandonment of the experiment.

According to Jean Hairston, the first superintendent of schools in Henry County was Greenberry T. Griggs, who served from 1870 to 1876. In 1871, he reported there were 19 one-room schools operating for white children and 10 operating for black children. These schools were in session for about four and a half months. In 1901 it was reported that there were 75 schools for white children and 32 for black children. Schools at this time went for five and a half months. All the schools only served grades 1–7.

== Administration ==
=== Superintendent ===
The current superintendent of Henry County Public Schools is Dr. Amy Blake-Lewis.

=== School board ===
The Henry County School Board has seven members:

- Thomas Auker, Chairman
- Elizabeth Durden
- Terri C. Flanagan
- Ben Gravely
- Teddy Martin II, Vice Chairman
- Cherie Whitlow
- Champ Hardie

== Schools ==
=== High schools ===
- Bassett High School
- Magna Vista High School

=== Middle schools ===
- Fieldale-Collinsville Middle School
- Laurel Park Middle School

=== Elementary schools ===
- Axton Elementary School
- Campbell Court Elementary School
- G. W. Carver Elementary School
- Drewry Mason Elementary School
- Meadow View Elementary
- Mount Olivet Elementary School
- Rich Acres Elementary School
- Sanville Elementary School
- Stanleytown Elementary School

=== Other sites ===
- Adult Education Center
- Center for Community Learning
- Career Academy

== See also ==
- List of school divisions in Virginia
