= Piedmont Governor's School for Mathematics, Science, and Technology =

Coordinates: 36.693070°N 79.876470°W

- Danville, VA; Martinsville, VA

Information
- Type: Magnet school Governor's school
- Established: 2002
- Director: Tiffiny Gravely (2024 – present)
- Grades: 11-12
- Enrollment: 147 (2023-2024)
- Website: www.pgsmst.com

The Piedmont Governor's School for Mathematics, Science, and Technology is one of Virginia's 18 state-initiated magnet Governor's Schools. It is a half-day school program where 11th and 12th grade students take advanced classes in the morning (receiving their remaining classes from their home high school.) Four classes are to be taken at the gov. school and two or three more per semester at their base school.

Students at PGSMST have the opportunity to earn an associate degree through Danville Community College (Danville students) or Patrick & Henry Community College (Martinsville students) while enrolled at the Governor's School.

The School does not have a classroom facility of its own. Instead, students travel to the Institute for Advanced Learning and Research (Danville site) or New College Institute (Martinsville site) to take courses offered by the program.

== History ==
Before The Piedmont Governors School for Mathematics Science and Technology, it was commonly called the GSGET (Governors School for Global Economics and Technology.)

The school is designed for eleventh (11th) and twelfth (12th) grade students from Danville City, Henry County, Martinsville City, and Pittsylvania County school divisions.

== Upon Consideration for Gov. School... ==
Nominations of potential candidates may be received from a variety of sources including students, parents, school personnel, and community leaders. Multiple criteria will be used to create a pool of applicants from the nominations to insure that a student can not be eliminated by one measure. The criteria may include such items as grade-point averages, Standards of Learning End-of-Course test results, scores from standardized tests, and successful completion of specific courses in mathematics, science, and technology.

The selection process will utilize percentile rankings on standardized achievement and ability tests, such as the Matrix Analogies Test (MAT); writing samples; unweighted grade-point averages; and teacher recommendations. In the event of a tie between students’ scores, science and mathematics course grades, and achievement tests scores in those areas will be compared.

== Participating school systems ==
As of 2008 the school has 125 students enrolled from its participating school systems:

- Danville City
- Henry County
- Martinsville City
- Pittsylvania County

== Junior Curriculum ==
- College Chemistry (CHM 111, 112)
- College Biology (BIO 101, 102)
- Advanced Calculus I (MTH 273)
- Advanced Mathematical Analysis (MTH 166)
- Research Methodology and Design (ENG 131)
- English 11 IALR Site only (ENG 111, 112)
- Applied Statistics (MTH 157)
- Computer Applications and Concepts NCI Site only (ITE 115)

== Senior Curriculum ==
- College Physics (PHY 201, 202)
- College Biology (BIO 101, 102)
- Human Anatomy (BIO 141, 142)
- Microbiology (BIO 205)
- Calculus of One Variable (MTH 175, 176)
- Advanced Calculus II (MTH 274)
- College Statistics (MTH 241, 242)
- Senior Research Application and Evaluation (ENG 210)
- English 12/College Composition IALR Site only (ENG 243, 244)
