= Penhook, Virginia =

- Census-designated place
- Location within the state of Virginia Penhook (the United States)
- Coordinates: 37°0′16″N 79°37′43″W
- Country: United States
- State: Virginia
- County: Franklin

Area
  - Total: 12.7 sq mi (32.8 km^{2})
  - Land: 11.2 sq mi (29.0 km^{2})
  - Water: 1.5 sq mi (3.8 km^{2})
- Elevation: 994 ft (303 m)

Population (2010)
  - Total: 801
  - Density: 72/sq mi (27.7/km^{2})
- Time zone: UTC−5 (Eastern (EST))
  - Summer (DST): UTC−4 (EDT)
- ZIP code: 24137
- Area code: 540
- FIPS code: 51-61464
- GNIS feature ID: 1497083

Penhook is a census-designated place (CDP) in Franklin County, Virginia, United States. As of the 2020 census, Penhook had a population of 782. It is part of the Roanoke metropolitan area.

== Geography ==
Penhook is located in eastern Franklin County at 37°0′16″N 79°37′43″W (37.004501, −79.628747). It is bordered to the east by the Pittsylvania County line and by the Cool Branch arm of Smith Mountain Lake. The northern edge of the CDP is the center of the Blackwater River part of the lake, while the northwestern edge follows the Bull Run arm of the lake and then Bull Run itself upstream to Virginia State Route 40, which runs east–west through the center of the CDP. The southern half of the CDP extends nearly to the Pigg River, an east-flowing tributary of the Roanoke River. Route 40 leads west 17 miles (27 km) to Rocky Mount, the Franklin County seat, and east 16 miles (26 km) to Gretna at U.S. Route 29.

According to the United States Census Bureau, the Penhook CDP has a total area of 12.7 square miles (32.8 km^{2}), of which 11.2 square miles (29.0 km^{2}) is land and 1.5 square miles (3.8 km^{2}), or 11.70%, is water.

== History ==
One of the older buildings in Penhook is the Old Chapel Church, located at 436 Old Chapel Road. This church house, also known as "Snow Creek Chapel", was built as a chapel of ease by the Church of England, by the Camden vestry, in 1769. In 2017, the Old Chapel Church was placed on the National Register of Historic Places. Gov. Terry McAuliffe has also deemed the church a “Virginia Treasure,” a designation for ecological, cultural, scenic and recreational assets.

== Demographics ==
Historical population
Census	Pop.	Note	%±
2000	726		—
2020	782		—
U.S. Decennial Census; 2000 2010 2020

Penhook was first listed as a census designated place in the 2000 U.S. census.

The 2000 census recorded 726 people, 308 households, and 243 families residing in the CDP. The population density was 65.0 people per square mile (25.1/km^{2}). There were 694 housing units at an average density of 62.2/sq mi (24.0/km^{2}). The racial makeup of the CDP was 80.85% White, 18.18% African American, 0.28% Asian, and 0.69% from two or more races. Hispanic or Latino of any race were 0.41% of the population.

There were 308 households, out of which 21.1% had children under the age of 18 living with them, 68.5% were married couples living together, 7.1% had a female householder with no husband present, and 20.8% were non-families. 18.8% of all households were made up of individuals, and 6.8% had someone living alone who was 65 years of age or older. The average household size was 2.36 and the average family size was 2.65.

In the CDP, the population was spread out, with 17.8% under the age of 18, 4.8% from 18 to 24, 22.9% from 25 to 44, 35.0% from 45 to 64, and 19.6% who were 65 years of age or older. The median age was 49 years. For every 100 females there were 100.0 males. For every 100 females age 18 and over, there were 97.7 males.

The median income for a household in the CDP was $55,278, and the median income for a family was $71,667. Males had a median income of $32,778 versus $23,125 for females. The per capita income for the CDP was $48,663. About 5.7% of families and 15.6% of the population were below the poverty line, including 32.7% of those under age 18 and none of those age 65 or over.
