= Collinsville, Virginia =

- CDP
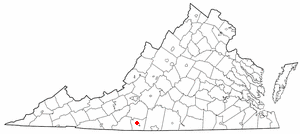
- Location of Collinsville, Virginia
- Coordinates: 36°43′19″N 79°54′55″W
- Country: United States
- State: Virginia
- County: Henry

Area
  - Total: 7.9 sq mi (20.4 km^{2})
  - Land: 7.9 sq mi (20.4 km^{2})
  - Water: 0.039 sq mi (0.1 km^{2})
- Elevation: 814 ft (248 m)

Population (2010)
  - Total: 7,335
  - Density: 931/sq mi (360/km^{2})
- Time zone: UTC−5 (Eastern (EST))
  - Summer (DST): UTC−4 (EDT)
- ZIP code: 24078
- Area code: 276
- FIPS code: 51-18352
- GNIS feature ID: 1495414

Collinsville is a census-designated place (CDP) in Henry County, Virginia, United States. As of the 2020 census, Collinsville had a population of 7,380. It is part of the Martinsville Micropolitan Statistical Area. Collinsville is also where the administration building and county courthouse of Henry County are located (though nearby Martinsville - an independent city which is not technically part of the county - is usually identified as the county seat).

== Geography ==
Collinsville is located at 36°43′19″N 79°54′55″W.

According to the United States Census Bureau, the CDP has a total area of 7.9 sq mi (20 km^{2}), of which 7.9 sq mi (20 km^{2}) is land and 0.04 sq mi (0.10 km^{2}) (0.25%) is water.

== Demographics ==
As of the census of 2000, there were 7,777 people, 3,466 households, and 2,197 families residing in the CDP. The population density was 988.1 inhabitants per square mile (381.5/km^{2}). There were 3,758 housing units at an average density of 477.5/sq mi (184.4/km^{2}). The racial makeup of the CDP was 84.84% White, 11.28% African American, 0.14% Native American, 0.63% Asian, 0.18% Pacific Islander, 1.98% from other races, and 0.95% from two or more races. Hispanic or Latino of any race were 3.77% of the population.

There were 3,466 households, out of which 27.2% had children under the age of 18 living with them, 47.1% were married couples living together, 12.2% had a female householder with no husband present, and 36.6% were non-families. 32.1% of all households were made up of individuals, and 12.4% had someone living alone who was 65 years of age or older. The average household size was 2.23 and the average family size was 2.77.

In the CDP, the population was spread out, with 21.6% under the age of 18, 8.3% from 18 to 24, 29.7% from 25 to 44, 23.2% from 45 to 64, and 17.2% who were 65 years of age or older. The median age was 38 years. For every 100 females, there were 90.3 males. For every 100 females age 18 and over, there were 87.2 males.

The median income for a household in the CDP was $30,380, and the median income for a family was $39,417. Males had a median income of $28,137 versus $20,955 for females. The per capita income for the CDP was $17,145. About 6.9% of families and 8.8% of the population were below the poverty line, including 10.0% of those under age 18 and 6.8% of those age 65 or over.

== Notable people ==
- Jarred A. Marlowe, local historian

== Climate ==
The climate in this area is characterized by hot, humid summers and generally mild to cool winters. According to the Köppen Climate Classification system, Collinsville has a humid subtropical climate, abbreviated "Cfa" on climate maps.
