= Patrick & Henry Community College =

Public college in Henry County, Virginia, US

Coordinates: 36.7394°N 79.870648°W

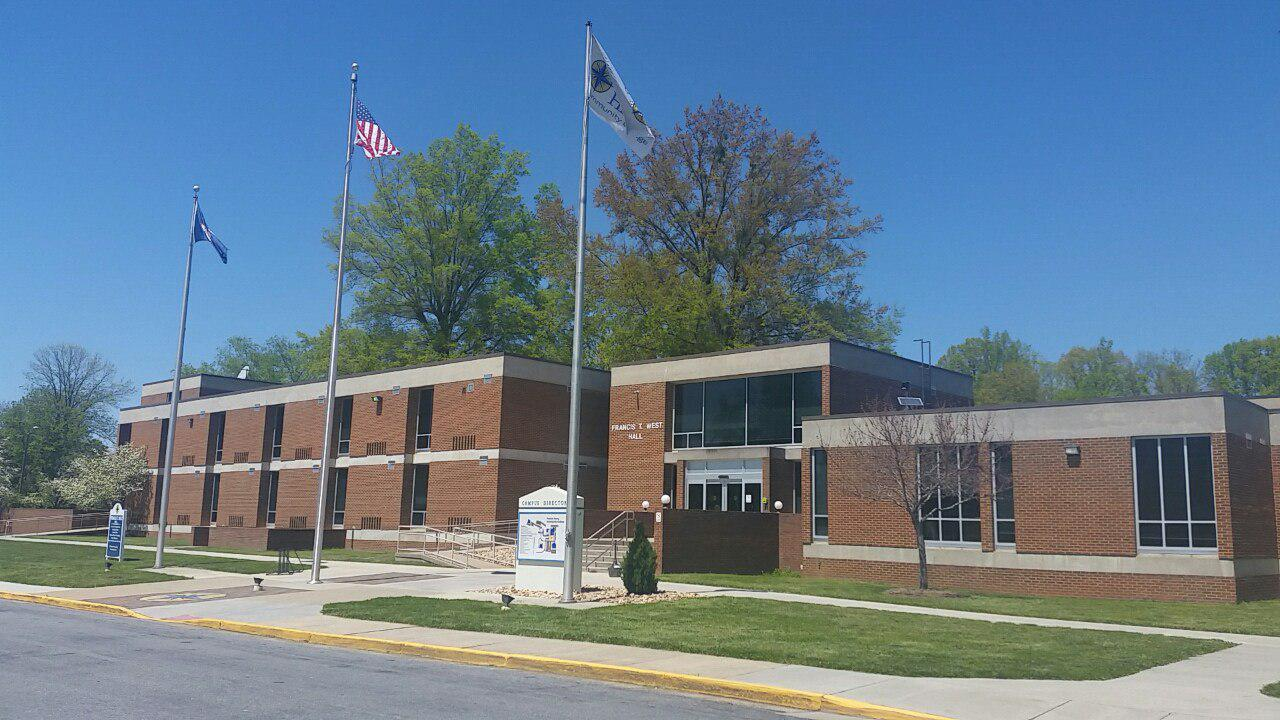
- Francis T. West Hall, the first building constructed on the college campus
- Former name: Patrick Henry Community College
- Motto: Make a living, Make a life.
- Type: Public community college
- Established: 1962; 64 years ago
- Accreditation: SACS
- Academic affiliations: VCCS
- President: James “Greg” Hodges
- Students: 2900 (average)
- Location: Martinsville, Virginia, United States
- Campus: Rural
- Academic Term: Semester
- Other campuses: Patrick County, Virginia
- Colors: Royal Blue & Gold
- Nicknames: Patriots & Lady Patriots
- Sporting affiliations: NJCAA Division II – Region 10 Conference
- Mascot: Patriot
- Website: www.patrickhenry.edu

Patrick & Henry Community College (P&HCC or Patrick & Henry) is a public community college in Martinsville, Virginia, United States. Accredited by the Commission on Colleges of the Southern Association of Colleges and Schools, P&HCC offers a variety of associate degree programs as well as certification and career studies programs.

== History ==
P&HCC was founded in 1962 as part of the University of Virginia's School of General Studies. The college became an independent two-year college in 1964 and part of the Virginia Community College System in 1971.

In July 2021, the Virginia State Board of Community Colleges changed names for local institutions named after people who owned slaves or advocated racist policies such as school segregation. The board allowed the college to change its name to Patrick & Henry Community College. Instead of venerating Patrick Henry, the first and sixth Governor of Virginia, the new name honors Patrick County and Henry County, two areas the institution serves that are named after Patrick Henry.

== Campus ==
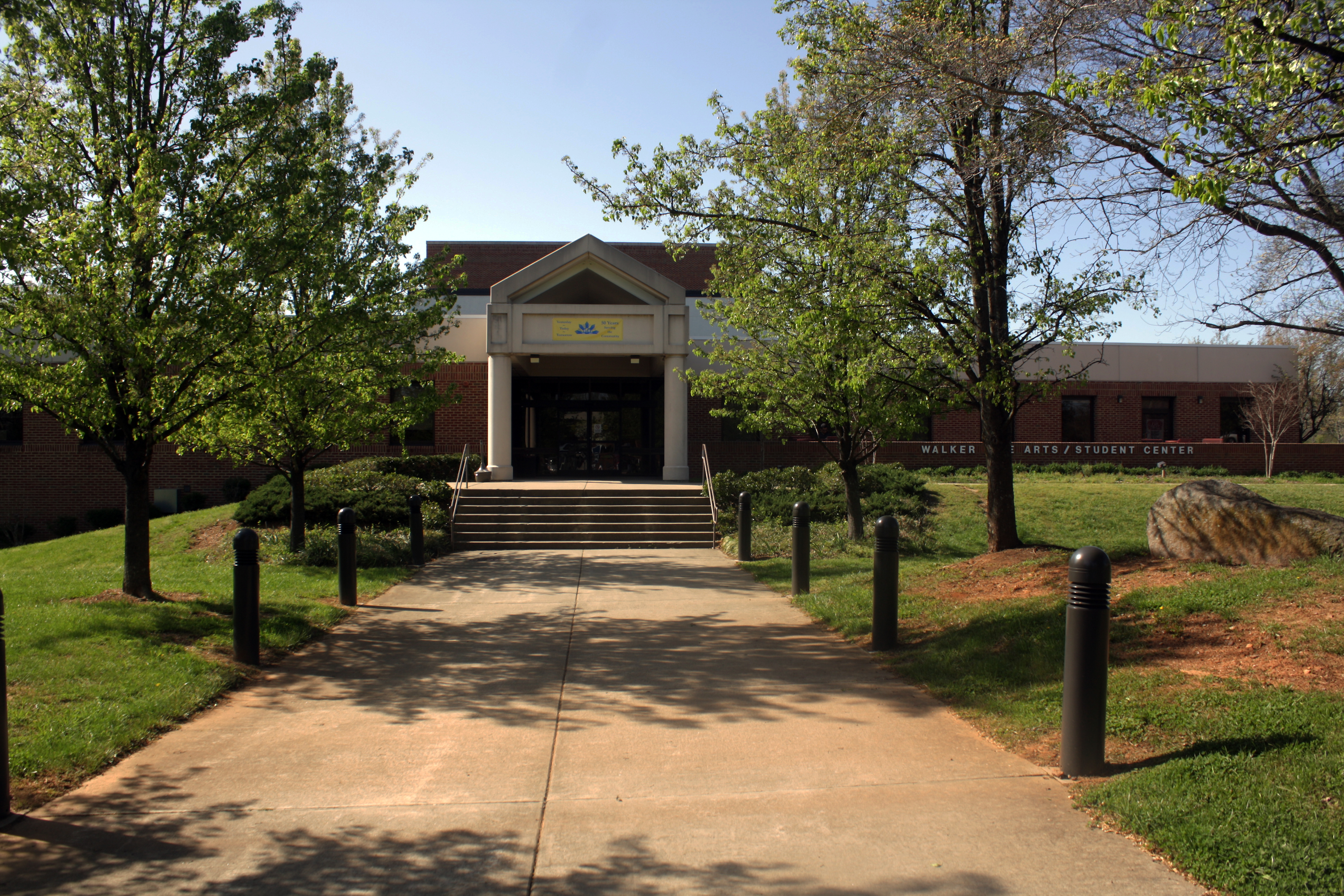
The Walker Fine Arts Building and Student Center

Classes were originally held in the old Northside Elementary School in Martinsville, Virginia before they were moved to the present campus. The first building, Francis T. West Hall, was completed in 1969 and served as an administration building. The Learning Resource Center, which houses the tutoring centers and the Lester Library, was completed in 1971. Five additional buildings have since been added, the last finished in 1999, and the entire campus underwent significant renovations in 2010. The campus is situated on 137 acres (0.55 km^{2}) approximately three miles north of the City of Martinsville.

In addition to the main campus, PHCC has additional satellite locations, including workforce development centers in Martinsville and nearby Stuart and the Virginia Motorsports Training Center, a reflection of the community's connection to NASCAR through Martinsville Speedway.

== Academics ==
Degree programs at Patrick & Henry Community College include associate degrees and certificate and career studies programs, as well as nontraditional programs (such as industrial certifications and "personal enrichment" courses) and transfer agreements with other colleges and universities throughout the region.

== Athletics ==
The Patrick & Henry Community College Patriots compete in the Carolinas Junior College Conference of the NJCAA's Division II. men's sports include baseball, basketball, soccer, golf, and track & field; women's sports include basketball, softball, soccer, golf, volleyball, and track & field. PHCC also hosts club sports such as gold & blue dance team and Esports. On May 28, 2024, the softball team won its first JUCO World Series championship.

== Notable alumni ==
- Bradley Hanner, professional baseball player for the New York Yankees
- Alison Parker, journalist for WDBJ who was killed alongside cameraman Adam Ward during a live on-air interview.
- Keven Wood, American professional stock car racing driver
