= Hairston =

Origin
- Meaning: habitational name from a place called Harestone or Harestane
- Region of origin: Scotland

Hairston is a surname of Scottish origin and may refer to:

== American baseball family ==
- Sam Hairston (1920–1997), former Major League Baseball player
  - Johnny Hairston (born 1944), retired Major League Baseball player
  - Jerry Hairston Sr. (born 1952), retired Major League Baseball player
    - Jerry Hairston Jr. (born 1976), former Major League Baseball player for the Los Angeles Dodgers
    - Scott Hairston (born 1980), former Major League Baseball player for the Washington Nationals

== Other people with the surname ==
- Al Hairston (born 1945), retired American professional basketball player and college head coach
- Carl Hairston (born 1952), former professional American football player
- Curtis Hairston (1961–1996), American soul/funk vocalist
- Danielle Hairston, American psychiatrist
- Eugene Hairston (1929–2014), American boxer
- George Hairston (1750–1825), gentleman planter, politician, and military officer in the Virginia Colony
- Happy Hairston (1942–2001), American professional basketball player
- PJ Hairston (born 1992), American professional basketball player
- Jester Hairston (1901–2000), American composer, songwriter, arranger, choral conductor, and actor
- Justise Hairston (born 1983), American professional football player
- Kamesha Hairston (born 1985), American professional basketball player
- Leslie Hairston (born 1961), American politician
- Malik Hairston (born 1987), American basketball player
- Maxwell Hairston (born 2003), American football player
- Nate Hairston (born 1994), American football player
- Nelson Hairston (1917–2008), American ecologist
- Robert Hairston (1717–1791), gentleman planter, politician, and military officer in the Virginia Colony
- Troy Hairston (born 1998), American football player
- Brother Will Hairston (1919–1988), American gospel singer and preacher

== See also ==
- Beaver Creek Plantation
