= Virginia Western Community College =

College in Roanoke, Virginia, U.S.

Coordinates: 37.246978°N 79.974015°W

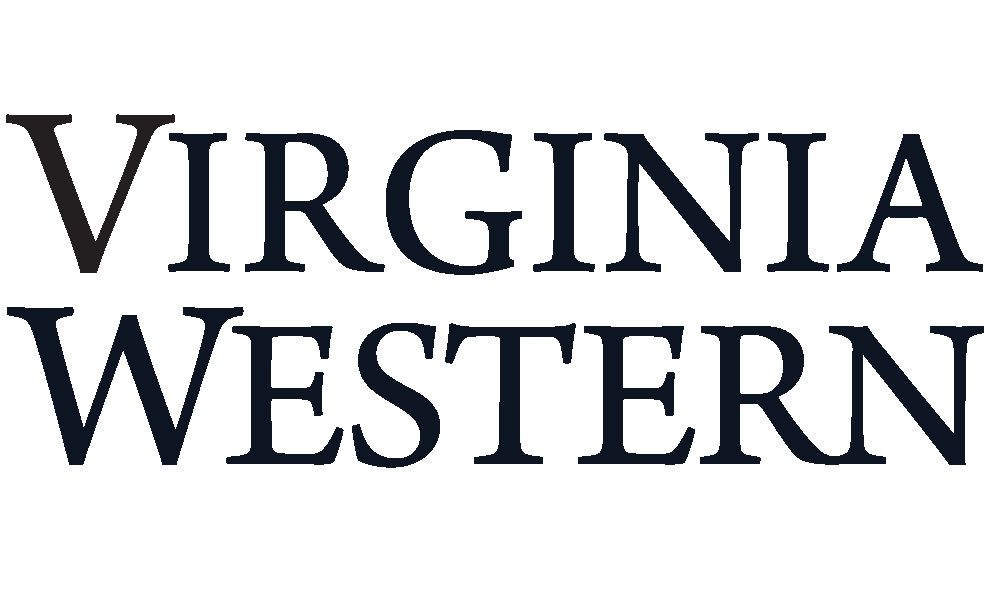
- Type: Public community college
- Established: 1966
- Parent institution: Virginia Community College System
- President: Laura Treanor, Ed.D.
- Undergraduates: 8,362
- Location: Roanoke, Virginia, United States
- Website: www.virginiawestern.edu

Virginia Western Community College (VWCC) is a public community college in Roanoke, Virginia. It is part of the Virginia Community College System.

== Academics ==
As of 2013, Virginia Western had 69 academic programs that awarded an Associate of Arts, Associate of Applied Science, Associate of Science, or certificate.

== Students ==
Most of the students at Virginia Western are enrolled part-time. Virginia Western Community College has student sports teams such as basketball and soccer. The college also has many student clubs and recreations for students.

In the fall 2020 semester, VWCC's total headcount was 8,362 students, 57% female, 43% male. The racial makeup of the student body is 70% White, 20% Black or African American, and 5% from other races.

== Facilities ==
According to the official campus map, Virginia Western has 16 buildings on campus: Chapman Hall, Craig Hall, Duncan Hall, Humanities, Thomas Center, Strauss Family Student Life Center, Webber Hall, Hall Family Center for Business Science, Fralin Center for Science & Health Professions, Brown Library, Fishburn Hall, Natural Science Center, Greenhouse, College Services, Field House, and the STEM center. The main campus is located in southwest Roanoke on 70-acres, about 1.4 miles away from Towers shopping center.

The campus includes a community arboretum, a two-acre garden east of Webber Hall. The garden features a children's garden with a "plant maze and plant zoo".

The Culinary Institute at Virginia Western is in the Claude Moore Education Complex in downtown Roanoke.

The college also operates the Greenfield Education & Training Center in Daleville.

The Roanoke Japanese Saturday School (ロノアーク補習授業校 Ronōaku Hoshū Jugyō Kō), a weekend Japanese educational program, was held at the Greenfield Education & Training Center. It was closed for an indeterminate period in April 2006 and closed permanently in February 2009.

== Notable alumni ==
- Nidal Hasan (born 1970) United States Army officer and perpetrator of the 2009 Fort Hood shooting
- Barry Michaels (born 1952) radio disc jockey
- Carol M. Swain (born 1954) law professor, U.S. Civil Rights Commission Advisory Committee
- Eric Phillips (born 1976) delegate for the 47th District in the Virginia House of Delegates
