= Virginia's 6th House of Delegates district =

Virginia legislative district

Virginia's 6th State House of Delegates district
- District map from the 2023 election
Delegate
Rip Sullivan; D–McLean
- Demographics: 65% White; 0% Black; 6% Hispanic; 21% Asian; 2% Native American; 0% Hawaiian/Pacific Islander; 1% Other; 6% Multiracial
- Population (2024) • Voting age: 82,127; 18
- Registered voters: 68,321

Virginia's 6th House of Delegates district is one of 100 seats in the Virginia House of Delegates, the lower house of the state's bicameral legislature. District 6 covers portions of Fairfax County. The district is represented by Democrat Rip Sullivan.

== District officeholders ==
Years	Delegate	Party	Electoral history
January 9, 2002 – January 11, 2006	Benny Keister	Democratic	Redistricted from 7th district
January 11, 2006 – January 8, 2014	Anne B. Crockett-Stark	Republican	Declined to run for reelection
January 8, 2014 – July 14, 2023	Jeff Campbell	Republican	Resigned to assume a judicial appointment
September 5, 2023 – January 10, 2024	Jed Arnold	Republican	First elected in a 2023 special election. Redistricted to the 46th District
January 10, 2024 – Present	Rip Sullivan	Democratic	Redistricted from the 48th District

== Electoral history ==
2015 General Election, Virginia 6th House of Delegates
Party	Candidate	Votes	%	±%
Republican	Jeff Campbell	15,921	100.00%	n/a
Total votes		15,921	100.00%	n/a

2016 General Election, Presidential
Party	Candidate	Votes	%	±%
Republican	Donald Trump	24,581	76.80%	n/a
Democratic	Hillary Clinton	6,423	20.07%	n/a
Libertarian	Gary Johnson	615	1.92%	n/a
Independent	Evan McMullin	245	0.77%	n/a
Green	Jill Stein	141	0.44%	n/a
Total votes		32,005	100.00%	n/a
