= Chatmoss, Virginia =

- CDP
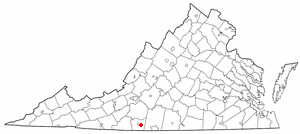
- Location of Chatmoss, Virginia
- Coordinates: 36°40′47″N 79°48′20″W
- Country: United States
- State: Virginia
- County: Henry

Area
  - Total: 5.4 sq mi (13.9 km^{2})
  - Land: 5.4 sq mi (13.9 km^{2})
  - Water: 0.039 sq mi (0.1 km^{2})
- Elevation: 646 ft (197 m)

Population (2010)
  - Total: 1,698
  - Density: 316/sq mi (122/km^{2})
- Time zone: UTC−5 (Eastern (EST))
  - Summer (DST): UTC−4 (EDT)
- FIPS code: 51-15048
- GNIS feature ID: 1495377

Chatmoss is a census-designated place (CDP) in Henry County, Virginia, United States. As of the 2020 census, Chatmoss had a population of 1,671. It is part of the Martinsville Micropolitan Statistical Area .

== History ==
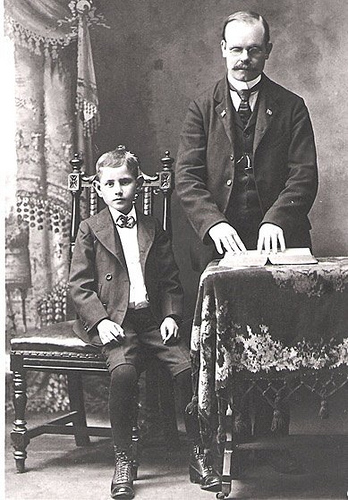
Blind itinerant evangelist and assistant, Chatmoss, c. 1898

Chatmoss takes its name from a 2,700-acre (11 km^{2}) Hairston family plantation on the site, which was later incorporated into a larger country club building on the site. That name probably derives from "Chat Moss", a large area of peat bog near Manchester, UK. In turn, that bog may be named after St Chad, or even from the Celtic word ced, meaning wood. Alternatively it may be an Old English personal name and mos, meaning "swamp." Low-lying areas around Chatmoss were boggy wetlands prone to flooding from Leatherwood Creek before mitigation by several dams.

The Hairston family owned many plantations scattered across the South, including plantations in North Carolina, Tennessee, Mississippi and Virginia. The family's Henry County plantations included still extant Beaver Creek Plantation and Hordsville, as well as plantations at Marrowbone, Magna Vista, Leatherwood, Camp Branch and Shawnee, which are no longer standing. The Chatmoss property was long owned by Harden Hairston, who inherited it, but it was later sold by a descendant to the developers of the country club on the site.

== Geography ==
Chatmoss is located at 36°40′47″N 79°48′20″W (36.679666, −79.805641).

According to the United States Census Bureau, the CDP has a total area of 5.4 square miles (13.9 km^{2}), of which 5.3 square miles (13.9 km^{2}) is land and 0.04 square mile (0.1 km^{2}) (0.37%) is water.

== Demographics ==
Historical population
Census	Pop.	Note	%±
2000	1,742		—
2020	1,671		—
U.S. Decennial Census; 2000 2010 2020

Chatmoss was first listed as a census designated place in the 2000 U.S. census formed along with Laurel Park CDP out of the deleted Chatmoss-Laurel Park CDP.

=== 2020 census ===
As of the 2020 census, Chatmoss had a population of 1,671. The median age was 53.1 years. 16.1% of residents were under the age of 18 and 31.8% of residents were 65 years of age or older. For every 100 females there were 97.5 males, and for every 100 females age 18 and over there were 93.9 males age 18 and over.

0.0% of residents lived in urban areas, while 100.0% lived in rural areas.

There were 729 households in Chatmoss, of which 20.3% had children under the age of 18 living in them. Of all households, 53.9% were married-couple households, 13.4% were households with a male householder and no spouse or partner present, and 29.2% were households with a female householder and no spouse or partner present. About 27.3% of all households were made up of individuals and 17.6% had someone living alone who was 65 years of age or older.

There were 777 housing units, of which 6.2% were vacant. The homeowner vacancy rate was 2.6% and the rental vacancy rate was 2.2%.

Racial composition as of the 2020 census
Race	Number	Percent
White	1,129	67.6%
Black or African American	403	24.1%
American Indian and Alaska Native	2	0.1%
Asian	35	2.1%
Native Hawaiian and Other Pacific Islander	2	0.1%
Some other race	37	2.2%
Two or more races	63	3.8%
Hispanic or Latino (of any race)	102	6.1%

=== 2000 census ===
As of the census of 2000, there were 1,742 people, 678 households, and 549 families residing in the CDP. The population density was 325.4 people per square mile (125.7/km^{2}). There were 715 housing units at an average density of 133.6/sq mi (51.6/km^{2}). The racial makeup of the CDP was 80.31% White, 15.67% African American, 0.17% Native American, 1.78% Asian, 1.15% from other races, and 0.92% from two or more races. Hispanic or Latino of any race were 6.08% of the population.

There were 678 households, out of which 32.3% had children under the age of 18 living with them, 72.6% were married couples living together, 5.8% had a female householder with no husband present, and 18.9% were non-families. 17.1% of all households were made up of individuals, and 7.1% had someone living alone who was 65 years of age or older. The average household size was 2.57 and the average family size was 2.88.

In the CDP, the population was spread out, with 22.8% under the age of 18, 5.3% from 18 to 24, 25.0% from 25 to 44, 33.6% from 45 to 64, and 13.3% who were 65 years of age or older. The median age was 43 years. For every 100 females, there were 94.4 males. For every 100 females age 18 and over, there were 93.8 males.

The median income for a household in the CDP was $58,929, and the median income for a family was $67,431. Males had a median income of $46,146 versus $27,031 for females. The per capita income for the CDP was $36,777. About 2.3% of families and 2.3% of the population were below the poverty line, including 1.8% of those under age 18 and 5.1% of those age 65 or over.
