= Alexander Hunter (planter) =

Alexander Hunter (born 1750 in Bedford County, Virginia- died 1804 in Henry County, Virginia) was an 18th-century tobacco planter in Southwestern Virginia, and supplier to the American Revolutionary Army. His home, "Hunter's Place", was along the Smith River (Virginia) in Henry County.

== Personal life ==
Alexander Hunter was the son of Alexander Hunter, Sr., (died before March 22, 1768, in Bedford County, Virginia) and Elizabeth (Steele) Hunter. His siblings mentioned in his father's will were: James, John, Samuel, Betty, and Alice Hays (and perhaps "Al[s?] Wilson" added later - order of births unspecified).

Alexander Hunter married Martha Patsy Hairston (June 6, 1753- June 3, 1832), daughter of Robert Hairston and Ruth Stovall Hairston, on June 3, 1769. Their child was Mary Polly Hunter (1775-1862) who married Burwell Bassett.

Martha Hunter, wife of Alexander Hunter, appeared in the Henry County court and using her dower conveyed 179 acres of land to Archibald Hughes, Esq. on March 23, 1780, for an undisclosed sum.

"Alexander was an eccentric character, and gave himself the nickname of "Devil" Aleck."

There was quite a bit of land selling and land acquisition during his lifetime. Alexander Hunter evidently owned land or had landed interests in neighboring Patrick County, Virginia, as well as in Bedford County and Henry County. "Alexander Hunter of Henry County to James Baker of the same sells and conveys for the sum of seven pounds ten shillings a tract of land containing 100 acres on the branches of Blackberry Creek …on the north side up the branch of the south fork of the branch to Hunter's old line to John Goings. Signed: Alexander Hunter (no witnesses), Proved 28 Feb 1791."

== Revolutionary War ==
Alexander Hunter enlisted as a private in Colonel William R. Lee's Regiment of the Continental Troops on November 14, 1777. He later appears on a muster roll of a detachment of Lee's Regiment commanded by Lt. Colonel Wm. Smith, Esq., late under the command of Captain Jonathan Drown, for the month of May, 1778.

Alexander Hunter supplied 200 pounds of beef to the American Army, in March 1782. He was also involved with his father-in-law as support to the sheriff of Henry County, and in his support as a supplier of goods and provender for the American Revolutionary Army. The "Ancestor Number" for Alexander Hunter by the Daughters of the American Revolution is: A032707. SAR PatriotID: 338789

== Estate at death ==
Alexander Hunter owned over 1,500 acres of tobacco land spread over several counties when he died. He also owned at least seven slaves. Alexander Hunter is buried at the Graves Knob Cemetery in Bassett, Virginia.

== Bibliography ==
- Bassett, Mary Henrian. The Bassett Family in Henry County, Virginia, with Stories, Mainly of the Woodson Bassett Branch. Martinsville, Va: Bassett, 1976. http://www.worldcat.org/oclc/2856828
- Blunt, Charles P. Complete Index and Abstract of the Henry County Order Books #1 and #2, 1777–1782. Richmond: Distributed by Briarwood Publications, 1978. http://www.worldcat.org/oclc/3892004
