= Harston (surname) =

Harston is a surname. Notable people with the surname include:

- John Harston (1920–2013), English footballer
- Julian Harston (born 1942), United Nations official
- Ted Harston (1907–1971), English footballer

== See also ==
- Hairston
