= Les Adams (politician) =

American politician and judge (born 1974)

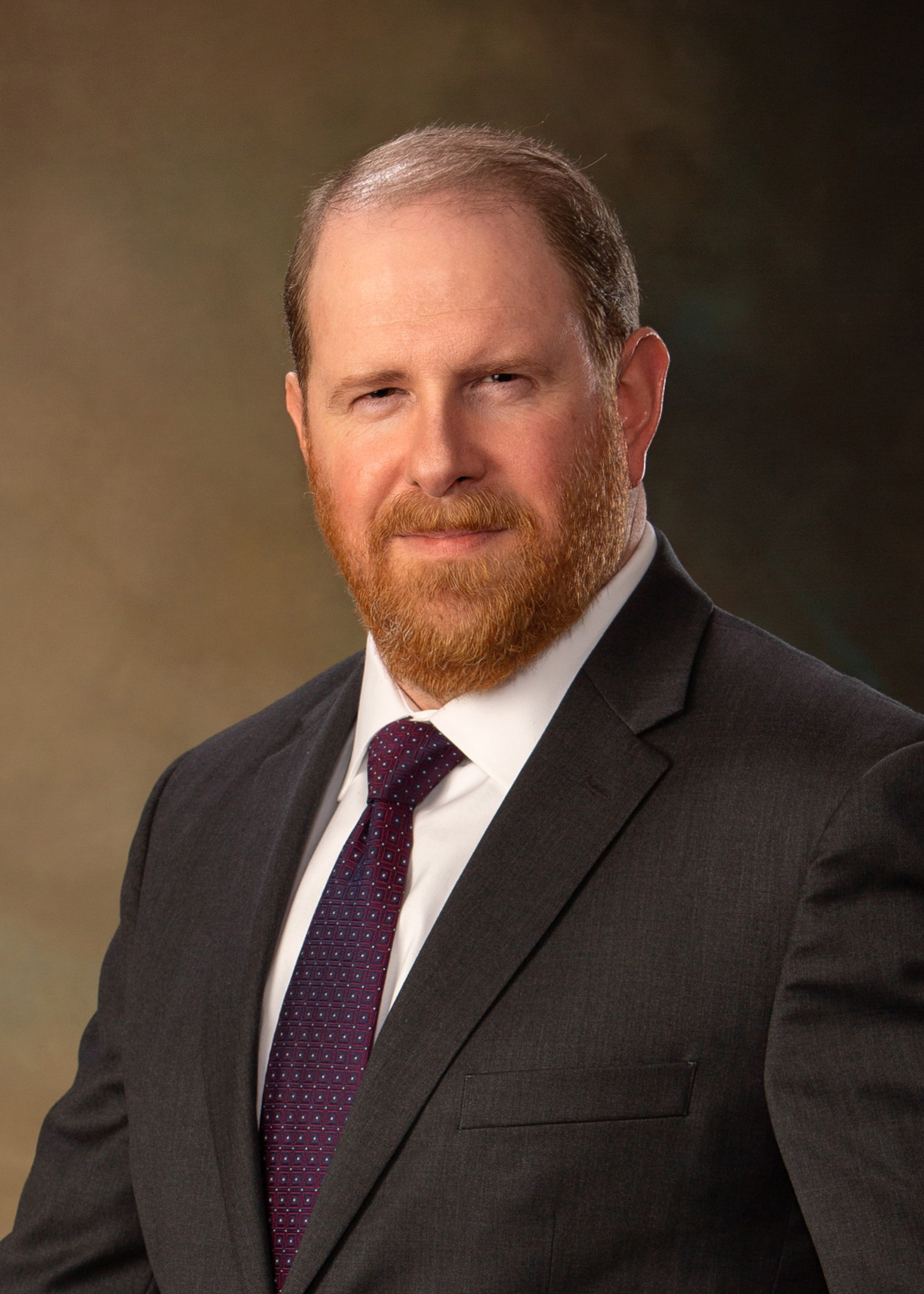
- Adams in 2020

Member of the Virginia House of Delegates from the 16th district
- In office January 8, 2014 – January 10, 2024
- Preceded by: Don Merricks
- Succeeded by: Eric Phillips (redistricting)

Personal details
- Born: Leslie Ray Adams; 1974 (age 51–52) Montgomery County, Virginia, U.S.
- Party: Republican
- Spouse: Melanie Evonne Schiefer
- Children: 2
- Education: Liberty University (BS); University of Richmond (JD)
- Occupation: Lawyer; politician; judge
- Committees: Courts of Justice; Privileges and Elections; Science and Technology; Transportation; Commerce and Energy
- Website: lesadams.org

Leslie Ray Adams (born 1974) is an American politician and judge. A Republican, Adams was a member of the Virginia House of Delegates from the 16th district in 2014, until his resignation in 2023.

== Early life ==
Adams was born in 1974, in Montgomery County, Virginia. He graduated from Liberty University with a Bachelor of Science in 1996 and from the University of Richmond School of Law with a Juris Doctor in 1999.

== Career ==
Adams was first elected to the Virginia House of Delegates in 2013, representing the 16th district. Unopposed, he was elected to represent the newly-drawn 48th district in the state's 2023 Virginia House of Delegates elections. He was a member of the Privileges and Elections Committee and the Commerce and Energy Committee. While serving, he opposed a gun control law in 2020, citing the people of Virginia for his opinion. Apart from the House of Delegates, he served as vice-chair of the Virginia State Crime Commission and a board member of the Virginia Tobacco Region Revitalization Commission.

On December 12, 2023, in a letter to a House clerk, Adams announced his resignation from the House of Delegates, effective at the end of his current term. He refused to take the oath of office, and stated he resigned to "make [himself] available for another position of service". On January 9, 2024, in the special election of his district, he was succeeded by Republican Eric Phillips.

Adams is an attorney. Following his resignation from the House of Delegates, he was appointed as a general district court judge for the 22nd Judicial District. His six-year term started on February 1, 2024.

== Personal life ==
Adams married Melanie Evonne Schiefer, and they have two sons. He lives in Chatham, Virginia. He is a Baptist.

== Electoral history ==
2013 Virginia House of Delegates election, 16th district
Party	Candidate	Votes	%
Republican	Leslie Ray Adams	13,292	63.1
Democratic	Elizabeth Jackson Jones	7,740	36.7
Total votes		21,075	100.0

2015 Virginia House of Delegates election, 16th district
Party	Candidate	Votes	%
Republican	Leslie Ray Adams	12,538	98.1
Total votes		12,775	100.0

2017 Virginia House of Delegates election, 16th district
Party	Candidate	Votes	%
Republican	Leslie Ray Adams	16,513	96.1
Total votes		17,181	100.0

2019 Virginia House of Delegates election, 16th district
Party	Candidate	Votes	%
Republican	Leslie Ray Adams	13,146	74.6
Libertarian	Dustin Wilson Evans	4,402	25.0
Total votes		17,631	100.0

2021 Virginia House of Delegates election, 16th district
Party	Candidate	Votes	%
Republican	Leslie Ray Adams	19,412	69.9
Democratic	Chance Brian Trevillian	8,308	29.9
Total votes		27,755	100.0
