= Villa Heights, Henry County, Virginia =

Villa Heights, Virginia
- Census-designated place
- Location within Virginia Location within the United States
- Coordinates: 36°41′59″N 79°53′59″W
- Country: United States
- State: Virginia
- County: Henry

Area
  - Total: 0.97 sq mi (2.5 km^{2})
  - Land: 0.97 sq mi (2.5 km^{2})
  - Water: 0 sq mi (0.0 km^{2})
- Elevation: 735 ft (224 m)

Population (2010)
  - Total: 717
  - Density: 740/sq mi (290/km^{2})
- Time zone: UTC−5 (Eastern (EST))
  - Summer (DST): UTC−4 (EDT)
- FIPS code: 51-81152
- GNIS feature ID: 1867600

Villa Heights is a census-designated place (CDP) in Henry County, Virginia, United States. The population was 717 at the 2010 census. It is part of the Martinsville Micropolitan Statistical Area.

== Geography ==
Villa Heights is located at 36°41′59″N 79°53′59″W (36.699667, −79.899666).

According to the United States Census Bureau, the CDP has a total area of 1.0 square mile (2.5 km^{2}), all land.

== Demographics ==
Historical population
Census	Pop.	Note	%±
2000	845		—
U.S. Decennial Census; 2000 2010 2020

Villa Heights was first listed as a census designated place in the 2000 U.S. census.

As of the census of 2000, there were 845 people, 343 households, and 229 families residing in the CDP. The population density was 877.9 people per square mile (339.9/km^{2}). There were 358 housing units at an average density of 372.0/sq mi (144.0/km^{2}). The racial makeup of the CDP was 73.02% White, 20.71% African American, 4.97% from other races, and 1.30% from two or more races. Hispanic or Latino of any race were 18.34% of the population.

There were 343 households, out of which 26.5% had children under the age of 18 living with them, 45.2% were married couples living together, 16.0% had a female householder with no husband present, and 33.2% were non-families. 28.9% of all households were made up of individuals, and 13.1% had someone living alone who was 65 years of age or older. The average household size was 2.46 and the average family size was 2.98.

In the CDP, the population was spread out, with 21.5% under the age of 18, 11.2% from 18 to 24, 29.0% from 25 to 44, 21.4% from 45 to 64, and 16.8% who were 65 years of age or older. The median age was 36 years. For every 100 females, there were 95.6 males. For every 100 females age 18 and over, there were 95.0 males.

The median income for a household in the CDP was $25,526, and the median income for a family was $30,052. Males had a median income of $21,488 versus $17,300 for females. The per capita income for the CDP was $13,491. About 10.2% of families and 18.6% of the population were below the poverty line, including 19.9% of those under age 18 and none of those age 65 or over.
