= Sandy Level, Virginia =

- Census-designated place
- Location within Virginia Location within the United States
- Coordinates: 36°33′33″N 79°43′35″W
- Country: United States
- State: Virginia
- County: Henry

Area
  - Total: 6.8 sq mi (17.6 km^{2})
  - Land: 6.8 sq mi (17.5 km^{2})
  - Water: 0.039 sq mi (0.1 km^{2})
- Elevation: 794 ft (242 m)

Population (2010)
  - Total: 484
  - Density: 71.6/sq mi (27.7/km^{2})
- Time zone: UTC−5 (Eastern (EST))
  - Summer (DST): UTC−4 (EDT)
- FIPS code: 51-70296
- GNIS feature ID: 1474026

Sandy Level is a census-designated place (CDP) in Henry County, Virginia, United States. As of the 2020 census, Sandy Level had a population of 464. It is part of the Martinsville Micropolitan Statistical Area.

== Geography ==
Sandy Level is located at 36°33′33″N 79°43′35″W (36.559188, −79.726501).

According to the United States Census Bureau, the CDP has a total area of 6.8 square miles (17.6 km^{2}), of which 6.7 square miles (17.5 km^{2}) is land and 0.04 square mile (0.1 km^{2}) is water, comprising a total area of 0.59% water.

== Demographics ==
Historical population
Census	Pop.	Note	%±
2000	689		—
2010	484		−29.8%
2020	464		−4.1%
U.S. Decennial Census; 2000 2010 2020

Sandy Level was first listed as a census designated place in the 2000 U.S. census.

=== Racial and ethnic composition ===
Sandy Level CDP, Virginia – Racial and ethnic composition Note: the US Census treats Hispanic/Latino as an ethnic category. This table excludes Latinos from the racial categories and assigns them to a separate category. Hispanics/Latinos may be of any race.
Race / Ethnicity (NH = Non-Hispanic)	Pop 2000	Pop 2010	Pop 2020	% 2000	% 2010	% 2020
White alone (NH)	174	171	182	25.25%	35.33%	39.22%
Black or African American alone (NH)	504	301	234	73.15%	62.19%	50.43%
Native American or Alaska Native alone (NH)	1	0	11	0.15%	0.00%	2.37%
Asian alone (NH)	0	0	2	0.00%	0.00%	0.43%
Native Hawaiian or Pacific Islander alone (NH)	0	0	0	0.00%	0.00%	0.00%
Other race alone (NH)	0	0	1	0.00%	0.00%	0.22%
Mixed race or Multiracial (NH)	6	8	15	0.87%	1.65%	3.23%
Hispanic or Latino (any race)	4	4	19	0.58%	0.83%	4.09%
Total	689	484	464	100.00%	100.00%	100.00%

=== 2000 census ===
As of the census of 2000, there were 689 people, 256 households, and 186 families residing in the CDP. The population density was 102.2 people per square mile (39.5/km^{2}). There were 277 housing units at an average density of 41.1/sq mi (15.9/km^{2}). The racial makeup of the CDP was 25.69% White, 73.29% African American, 0.15% Native American, and 0.87% from two or more races. Hispanic or Latino of any race were 0.58% of the population.

There were 256 households, out of which 30.5% had children under the age of 18 living with them, 43.0% were married couples living together, 24.2% had a female householder with no husband present, and 27.0% were non-families. 24.2% of all households were made up of individuals, and 7.4% had someone living alone who was 65 years of age or older. The average household size was 2.69 and the average family size was 3.22.

In the CDP, the population was spread out, with 28.0% under the age of 18, 8.7% from 18 to 24, 27.0% from 25 to 44, 24.4% from 45 to 64, and 11.9% who were 65 years of age or older. The median age was 34 years. For every 100 females, there were 84.2 males. For every 100 females age 18 and over, there were 83.7 males.

The median income for a household in the CDP was $20,089, and the median income for a family was $37,011. Males had a median income of $27,969 versus $19,342 for females. The per capita income for the CDP was $12,757. About 15.5% of families and 21.4% of the population were below the poverty line, including 22.1% of those under age 18 and 38.1% of those age 65 or over.
