= Martinsville micropolitan area, Virginia =

Sstatistical area in Virginia, US

Coordinates: 36.6915°N 79.8725°W

Martinsville, Virginia Area
- Micropolitan Statistical Area
- Martinsville, VA Micropolitan Statistical Area
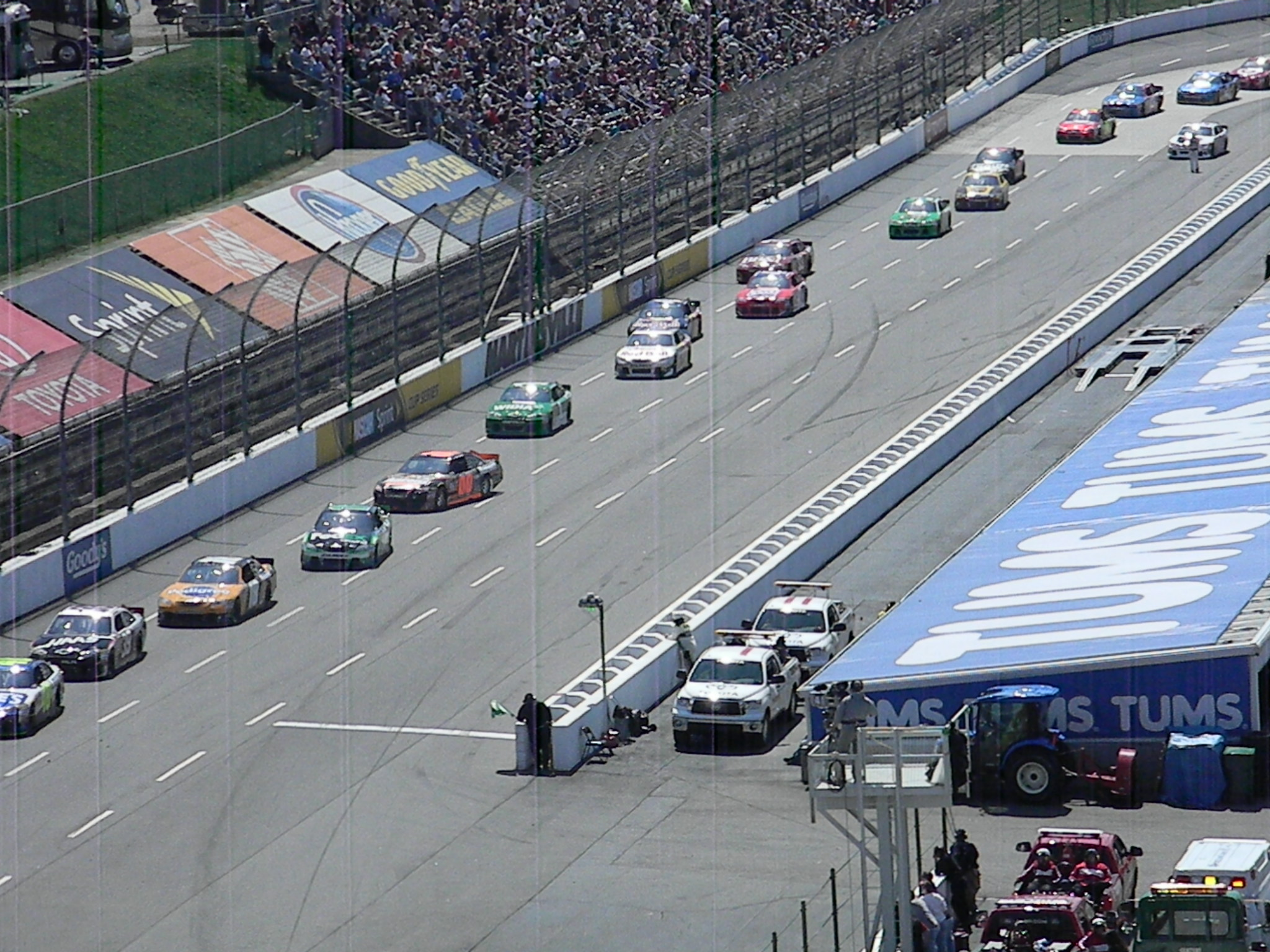
- Back Stretch of Martinsville Speedway
Interactive Map of Martinsville, VA μSA
City of Martinsville
Martinsville, VA μSA
- Country: United States
- State: Virginia
- Largest city: Martinsville
- Time zone: UTC−5 (EST)
  - Summer (DST): UTC−4 (EDT)

The Martinsville Micropolitan Statistical Area is a United States Micropolitan Statistical Area (USA) in Virginia, as defined by the Office of Management and Budget (OMB) as of June, 2003. As of the 2000 census, the μSA had a population of 73,346 (though a July 1, 2009 estimate placed the population at 69,523).

== Components ==
Note: Since a state constitutional change in 1871, all cities in Virginia are independent cities that are not located in any county. The OMB considers these independent cities to be county-equivalents for the purpose of defining μSAs in Virginia.

One county and one independent city are included in the Martinsville Micropolitan Statistical Area.

- Counties
  - Henry
- Independent Cities
  - Martinsville

== Communities ==
- Cities
  - Martinsville (Principal city)
- Towns
  - Ridgeway
- Census-designated places
  - Bassett
  - Chatmoss
  - Collinsville
  - Fieldale
  - Horsepasture
  - Laurel Park
  - Oak Level
  - Sandy Level
  - Stanleytown
  - Villa Heights
- Unincorporated places
  - Axton
  - Spencer

== Demographics ==
As of the census of 2000, there were 73,346 people, 30,408 households, and 20,974 families residing within the μSA. The racial makeup of the μSA was 70.43% White, 16.04% African American, 0.15% Native American, 0.41% Asian, 0.03% Pacific Islander, 1.24% from other races, and 0.90% from two or more races. Hispanics or Latinos of any race were 13.92% of the population.

The median income for a household in the μSA was $29,629 and the median income for a family was $36,985. Males had a median income of $27,595 versus $21,067 for females. The per capita income for the μSA was $17,181.

== See also ==
- Virginia census statistical areas
