= Eric Phillips (politician) =

Virginia politician

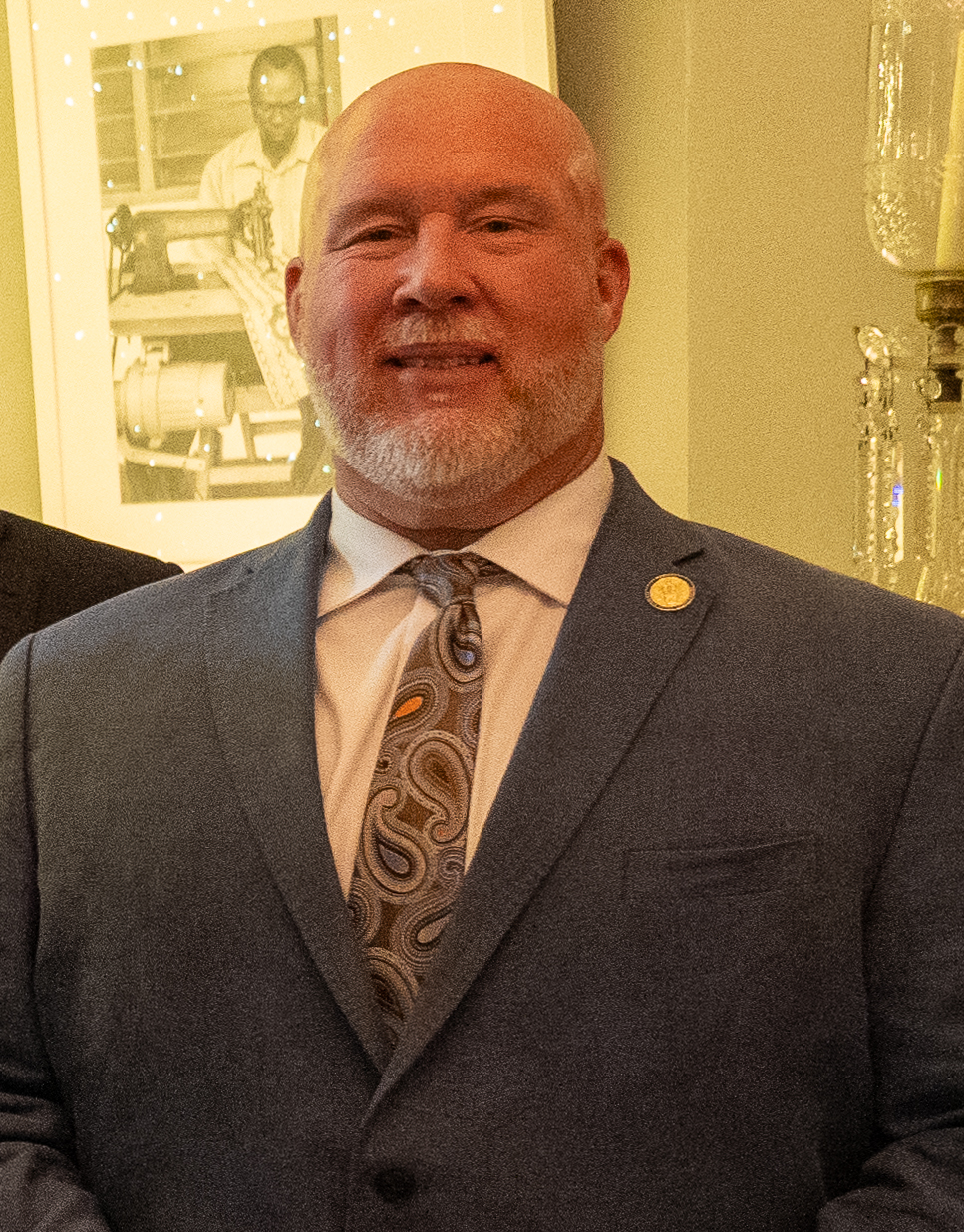

Member of the Virginia House of Delegates from the 48th district
- Incumbent
- Assumed office January 10, 2024
- Preceded by: Les Adams (Redistricting)

Personal details
- Born: March 31, 1976 (age 50) Martinsville, Virginia, U.S.
- Party: Republican
- Education: Virginia Western Community College; Lee University
- Occupation: Businessman
- Committees: Public Safety; Privileges and Elections
- Website: EricPhillipsForVA.com

Eric Phillips is an American businessman serving as delegate for the 48th district of the Virginia House of Delegates.

Phillips, a Republican, defeated Democratic nominee, Melody Cartwright, in the 2024 Virginia House of Delegates Special Election of the 48th District. This seat was vacated by Delegate Les Adams so he can "make [himself] available for another position of service."

In 2025, Phillips defeated Democrat Melody A. "Mel" Cartwright in the 2025 Virginia House of Delegates election.

== Electoral history ==
Date	Election	Candidate	Party	Votes	%
Virginia House of Delegates, 48th district
Jan 9, 2024	Special	Melody A. "Mel" Cartwright	Democrat	1,785	28.20
Jan 9, 2024	Special	Eric Phillips	Republican	4,320	70.66
Jan 9, 2024	Special	Write Ins		9	0.15
Nov 4, 2025	General	Barbara M. Hancock	Independent	519	1.66
Nov 4, 2025	General	Melody A. "Mel" Cartwright	Democratic	10,797	34.59
Nov 4, 2025	General	Eric Phillips	Republican	19,868	63.65
Nov 4, 2025	General	Write Ins		32	0.10
