= Horsepasture, Virginia =

- CDP
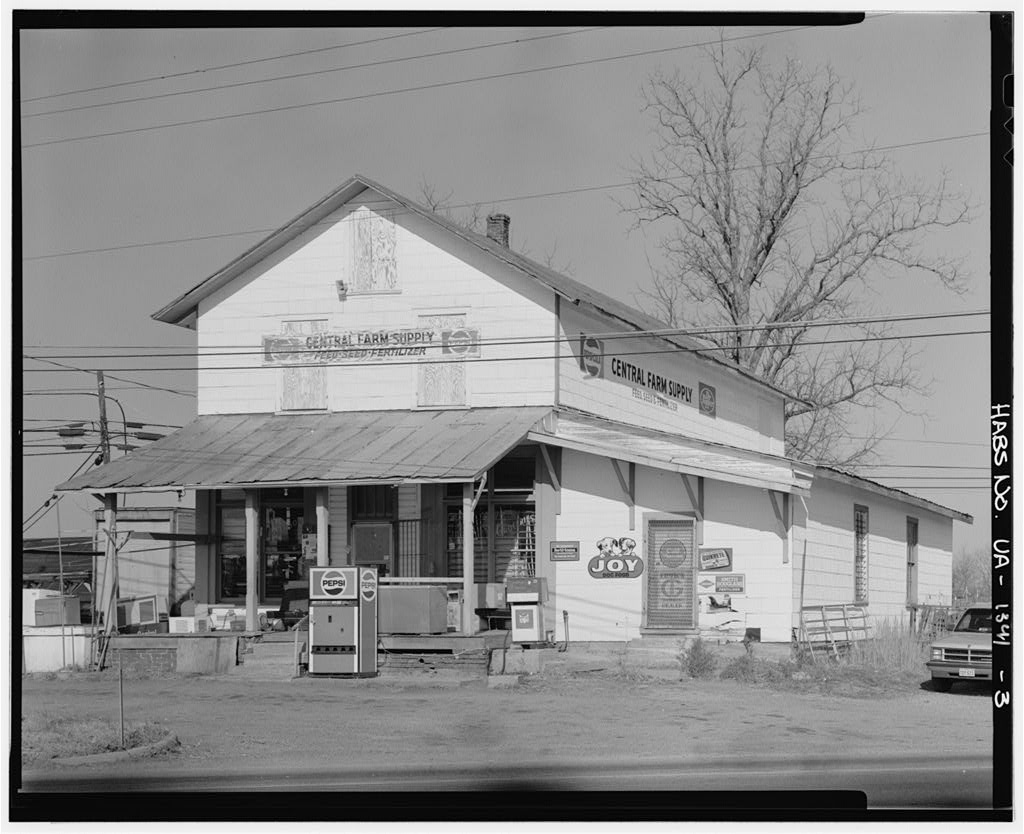
- Horsepasture Store, Horsepasture

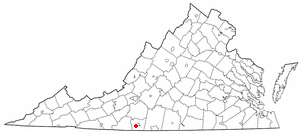
- Location of Horsepasture, Virginia
- Coordinates: 36°37′35″N 79°56′27″W
- Country: United States
- State: Virginia
- County: Henry

Area
  - Total: 9.7 sq mi (25.0 km^{2})
  - Land: 9.6 sq mi (24.9 km^{2})
  - Water: 0.039 sq mi (0.1 km^{2})
- Elevation: 1,119 ft (341 m)

Population (2010)
  - Total: 2,227
  - Density: 232/sq mi (89.4/km^{2})
- Time zone: UTC−5 (Eastern (EST))
  - Summer (DST): UTC−4 (EDT)
- FIPS code: 51-38552
- GNIS feature ID: 1495717

Horsepasture is a census-designated place (CDP) in Henry County, Virginia, United States. The population was 2,227 at the 2010 census. It is part of the Martinsville Micropolitan Statistical Area.

== Geography ==
Horsepasture is located at 36°37′35″N 79°56′27″W (36.626394, −79.940695).

According to the United States Census Bureau, the CDP has a total area of 9.6 square miles (25.0 km^{2}), of which 9.6 square miles (24.9 km^{2}) is land and 0.04 square mile (0.1 km^{2}) (0.31%) is water.

== Demographics ==
As of the census of 2000, there were 2,255 people, 957 households, and 673 families residing in the CDP. The population density was 234.3 people per square mile (90.5/km^{2}). There were 1,021 housing units at an average density of 106.1/sq mi (41.0/km^{2}). The racial makeup of the CDP was 70.16% White, 27.98% African American, 0.31% Native American, 0.18% Asian, and 1.37% from two or more races. Hispanic or Latino of any race were 0.35% of the population.

There were 957 households, out of which 24.1% had children under the age of 18 living with them, 54.6% were married couples living together, 11.1% had a female householder with no husband present, and 29.6% were non-families. 27.5% of all households were made up of individuals, and 11.9% had someone living alone who was 65 years of age or older. The average household size was 2.36 and the average family size was 2.83.

In the CDP, the population was spread out, with 20.9% under the age of 18, 6.6% from 18 to 24, 27.6% from 25 to 44, 27.5% from 45 to 64, and 17.5% who were 65 years of age or older. The median age was 42 years. For every 100 females, there were 92.1 males. For every 100 females age 18 and over, there were 91.6 males.

The median income for a household in the CDP was $38,036, and the median income for a family was $43,333. Males had a median income of $25,080 versus $22,230 for females. The per capita income for the CDP was $17,368. About 6.4% of families and 8.7% of the population were below the poverty line, including 10.4% of those under age 18 and 8.7% of those age 65 or over.

== People from Horsepasture, Virginia ==
- Jessamine Shumate
- Jimmy Hensley
- Al Scales Reynolds
