= Benjamin Dyer =

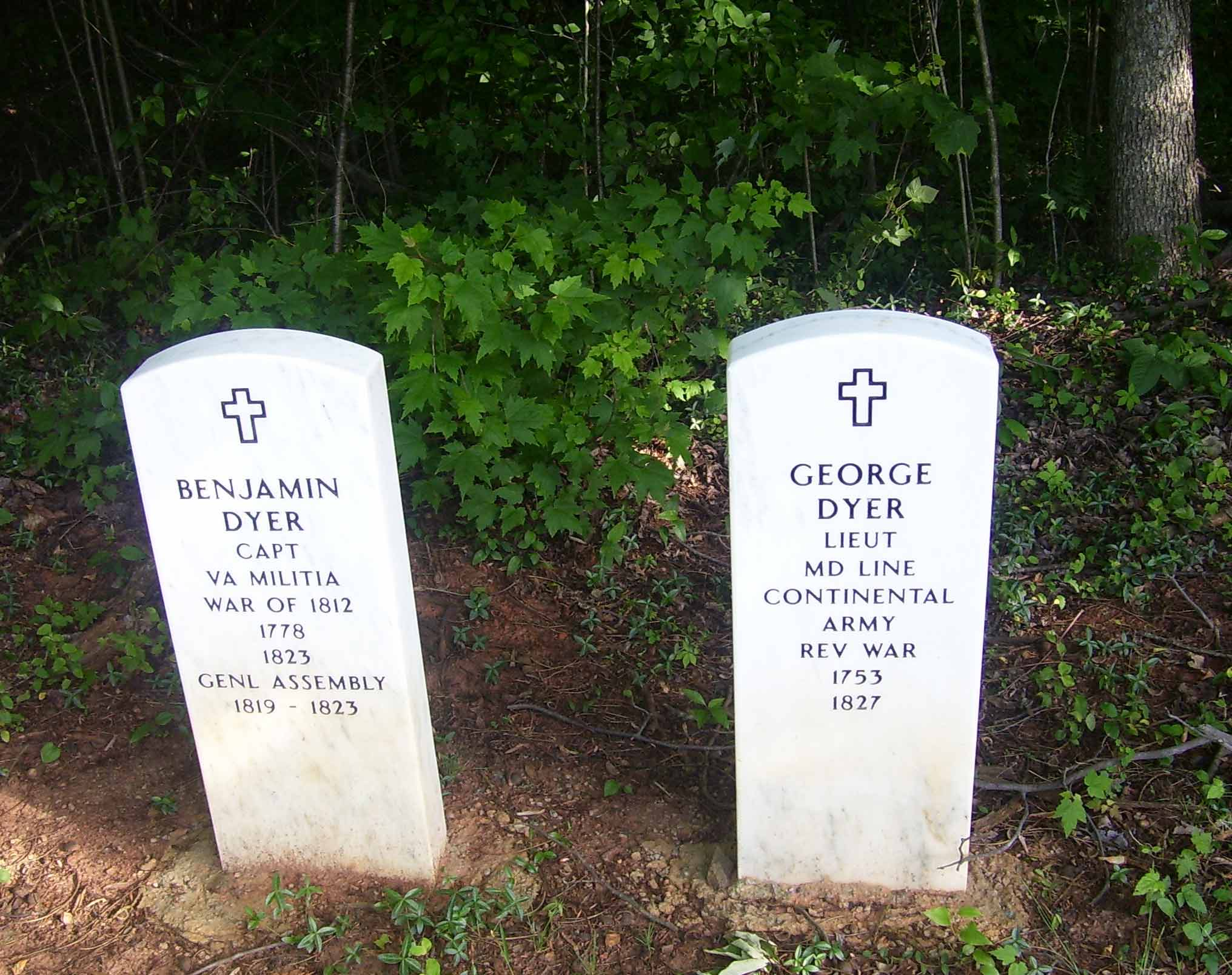
Benjamin Dyer's grave marker, alongside of his revolutionary war veteran father's grave marker in Henry County, Virginia, 2006.

Benjamin Dyer (1778—1823) was the captain (later, a lieutenant) of the 5th Company of the 64th regiment of the Virginia militia in Henry County during the War of 1812. He led the detachment of Henry County militia to the coastal border of Norfolk, Virginia to help defend against British invasion by sea.

He was born in Pittsylvania County, Virginia. He was the son of American Revolutionary War soldier George Dyer.

Dyer served as a state legislator in the Virginia General Assembly from 1819 till his death in 1823. His son Benjamin F. Dyer, Jr. also served in the Virginia Assembly.

Dyer and his prominent family operated a local store near Leatherwood, Virginia. Locations named in his honor include Dyers Store Road and the Dyers Store Volunteer Fire Department.
