= Laurel Park, Virginia =

- CDP
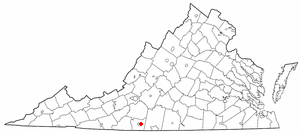
- Location of Laurel Park, Virginia
- Coordinates: 36°41′23″N 79°47′27″W
- Country: United States
- State: Virginia
- County: Henry

Area
  - Total: 1.3 sq mi (3.3 km^{2})
  - Land: 1.3 sq mi (3.3 km^{2})
  - Water: 0 sq mi (0.0 km^{2})
- Elevation: 791 ft (241 m)

Population (2010)
  - Total: 675
  - Density: 530/sq mi (200/km^{2})
- Time zone: UTC−5 (Eastern (EST))
  - Summer (DST): UTC−4 (EDT)
- FIPS code: 51-44476
- GNIS feature ID: 1497321

Laurel Park is a census-designated place (CDP) in Henry County, Virginia, United States. As of the 2020 census, Laurel Park had a population of 657. It is part of the Martinsville Micropolitan Statistical Area.

== Geography ==
Laurel Park is located at 36°41′23″N 79°47′27″W (36.689798, −79.790791).

According to the United States Census Bureau, the CDP has a total area of 1.3 square miles (3.3 km^{2}), of which 1.3 square miles (3.3 km^{2}) is land and 0.78% is water. Laurel Park is not to be confused with the housing estate within the Laurel region of Henrico County. Also, Henry County is not to be confused with Henrico County. Henrico is a largely suburban county surrounding Richmond, north of the James River.

== Demographics ==
Historical population
Census	Pop.	Note	%±
2000	781		—
2010	675		−13.6%
2020	657		−2.7%
U.S. Decennial Census; 2000 2010 2020

Laurel Park was first listed as a census designated place in the 2000 U.S. census formed along with Chatmoss CDP out of the deleted Chatmoss-Laurel Park CDP.

=== Racial and ethnic composition ===
Laurel Park CDP, Virginia – Racial and ethnic composition Note: the US Census treats Hispanic/Latino as an ethnic category. This table excludes Latinos from the racial categories and assigns them to a separate category. Hispanics/Latinos may be of any race.
Race / Ethnicity (NH = Non-Hispanic)	Pop 2000	Pop 2010	Pop 2020	% 2000	% 2010	% 2020
White alone (NH)	254	222	170	32.52%	32.89%	25.88%
Black or African American alone (NH)	500	414	423	64.02%	61.33%	64.38%
Native American or Alaska Native alone (NH)	0	0	0	0.00%	0.00%	0.00%
Asian alone (NH)	3	7	9	0.38%	1.04%	1.37%
Native Hawaiian or Pacific Islander alone (NH)	1	0	1	0.13%	0.00%	0.15%
Other race alone (NH)	3	0	1	0.38%	0.00%	0.15%
Mixed race or Multiracial (NH)	5	9	17	0.64%	1.33%	2.59%
Hispanic or Latino (any race)	15	23	36	1.92%	3.41%	5.48%
Total	781	675	657	100.00%	100.00%	100.00%

=== 2000 census ===
As of the census of 2000, there were 781 people, 331 households, and 231 families residing in the CDP. The population density was 614.4 people per square mile (237.4/km^{2}). There were 342 housing units at an average density of 269.0/sq mi (104.0/km^{2}). The racial makeup of the CDP was 33.29% White, 64.40% African American, 0.38% Asian, 0.13% Pacific Islander, 1.15% from other races, and 0.64% from two or more races. Hispanic or Latino of any race were 1.92% of the population.

There were 331 households, out of which 34.1% had children under the age of 18 living with them, 52.3% were married couples living together, 15.7% had a female householder with no husband present, and 30.2% were non-families. 27.5% of all households were made up of individuals, and 5.4% had someone living alone who was 65 years of age or older. The average household size was 2.36 and the average family size was 2.87.

In the CDP, the population was spread out, with 24.7% under the age of 18, 9.6% from 18 to 24, 30.1% from 25 to 44, 29.1% from 45 to 64, and 6.5% who were 65 years of age or older. The median age was 36 years. For every 100 females, there were 87.3 males. For every 100 females age 18 and over, there were 80.9 males.

The median income for a household in the CDP was $42,361, and the median income for a family was $47,143. Males had a median income of $29,904 versus $23,363 for females. The per capita income for the CDP was $17,413. About 2.7% of families and 3.8% of the population were below the poverty line, including none of those under the age of eighteen or sixty-five or over.
