= Jeff Campbell (Virginia politician) =

American politician (born 1966)

Jeffrey L. Campbell

Member of the Virginia House of Delegates from the 6th district
- In office January 8, 2014 – July 14, 2023
- Preceded by: Anne B. Crockett-Stark
- Succeeded by: Jed Arnold

Personal details
- Born: September 17, 1966 (age 59) Smyth County, Virginia, U.S.
- Party: Republican
- Spouse: Carie Michelle Hammond
- Children: 4
- Education: Emory and Henry College; Appalachian School of Law
- Profession: Attorney
- Committees: Counties, Cities and Towns; Courts of Justice, Science and Technology
- Website: http://votejeffcampbell.com/

Jeffrey Lynn Campbell (born September 17, 1966) is an American politician from Virginia. A member of the Republican Party, Campbell served as a member of the Virginia House of Delegates for the 6th district. He is from Saltville, Virginia. He also teaches state and local government law at the Appalachian School of Law.

In 2021, Campbell was one of three Republicans who voted to abolish Virginia's death penalty.

Campbell resigned in July 2023 to assume a judicial appointment.

== Election results ==
2013 6th House of Delegates District Republican primary
Party	Candidate	Votes	%
Republican	Jeffrey Lynn Campbell	684	70.7
Republican	Jack Brooks Weaver	284	29.3

2013 6th House of Delegates District general election
Party	Candidate	Votes	%
Republican	Jeffrey Lynn Campbell	11,576	57
Democratic	Jonathan Lee McGrady	7,425	36.6
Independent	Barbara Tidwell Hall	1,288	6.3

2015 6th House of Delegates District general election
Party	Candidate	Votes	%
Republican	Jeffrey L. Campbell	15,921	98.4
Write-Ins	Others	265	1.6

2017 6th House of Delegates District general election
Party	Candidate	Votes	%
Republican	Jeffrey L. Campbell	16,795	81.3
Independent	Kenneth David Browning	3,695	17.9

2019 6th House of Delegates District general election
Party	Candidate	Votes	%
Republican	Jeffrey L. Campbell	16,879	76.8
Democratic	James Robert Barker	5,050	23
