= Robert H. Brink =

American politician (born 1946)

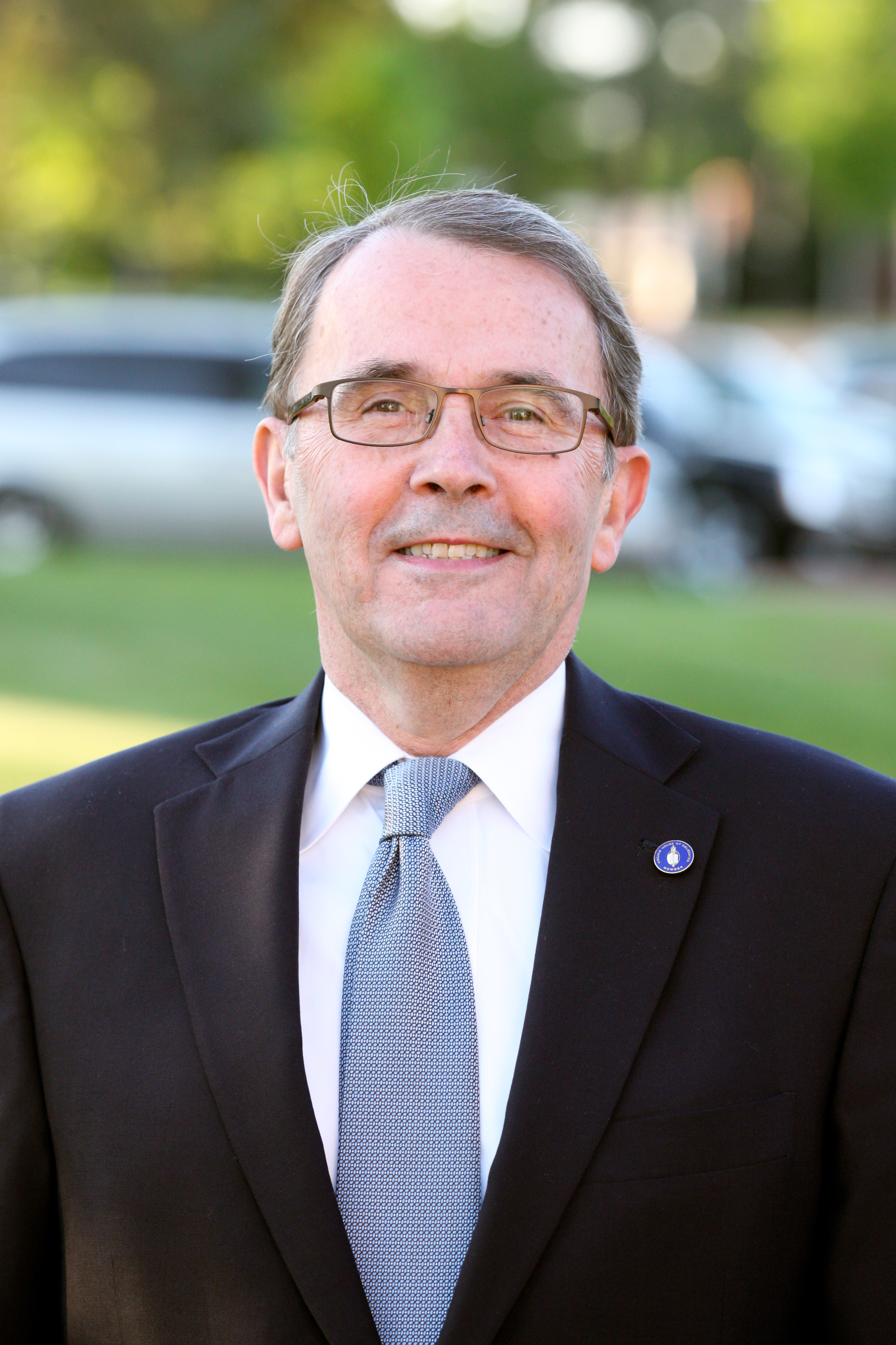
- Brink in 2010

Member of the Virginia House of Delegates from the 48th district
- In office January 14, 1998 – June 30, 2014
- Preceded by: Julia A. Connally
- Succeeded by: Richard Sullivan

Personal details
- Born: November 27, 1946 (age 79) Chicago, Illinois, U.S.
- Party: Democratic
- Spouse: Deborah Harrison Schanck (divorced)
- Children: David, Eliza
- Education: Monmouth College; College of William & Mary
- Profession: Lawyer
- Website: www.bobbrink.org

Military service
- Allegiance: United States
- Branch/service: United States Army
- Years of service: 1969–1971
- Battles/wars: Vietnam War

Robert Hendricks "Bob" Brink (born November 27, 1946) is an American politician. A member of the Democratic Party, he served in the Virginia House of Delegates from 1998 to 2014, representing the 48th district in the Arlington and Fairfax County suburbs of Washington, D.C. He resigned to become deputy commissioner for aging services in the administration of Governor Terry McAuliffe.

== Committee service ==
During his time in the Virginia House of Delegates, Brink served on the House committees on Appropriations (2006–2014), Chesapeake and Its Tributaries (1998–1999), Courts of Justice (2004–2005), Health, Welfare and Institutions (1998–2001), Labor and Commerce (1998–2001), Militia and Police (1998–1999), Privileges and Elections (2002–2009 and 2013–2014), Science and Technology (1998–2004), and Transportation (2008–2014).

== Subsequent career ==
In June 2014, Brink announced his resignation to become deputy commissioner for aging services under Governor Terry McAuliffe.

== Electoral history ==
Date	Election	Candidate	Party	Votes	%
Virginia House of Delegates, 48th district
Jun 10, 1997	Democratic primary	Robert H. Brink		2,722	64.08
Jun 10, 1997	Democratic primary	David W. Roberts		1,526	35.92
Nov 4, 1997	General	Robert H. Brink	Democratic	11,510	57.77
Nov 4, 1997	General	S. John Massoud	Republican	7,156	35.91
Nov 4, 1997	General	R. D. "Dick" Smith	Reform	1,242	6.23
Nov 4, 1997	General	Write Ins		17	0.09
Nov 4, 1997	General	Julia A. Connally retired; seat stayed Democratic			
Nov 2, 1999	General	Robert H. Brink	Democratic	9,759	62.78
Nov 2, 1999	General	S. John Massoud	Republican	5,783	37.20
Nov 2, 1999	General	Write Ins		3	0.02
Nov 6, 2001	General	Robert H. Brink	Democratic	14,652	64.54
Nov 6, 2001	General	Victor K. Williams	Republican	8,043	35.43
Nov 6, 2001	General	Write Ins		6	0.03
Nov 4, 2003	General	Robert H. Brink	Democratic	9,074	60.86
Nov 4, 2003	General	Steve V. Sass	Republican	5,821	39.04
Nov 4, 2003	General	Write Ins		15	0.10
Nov 8, 2005	General	Robert H. Brink	Democratic	19,703	97.51
Nov 8, 2005	General	Write Ins		503	2.49
Nov 6, 2007	General	Robert H. Brink	Democratic	10,947	97.23
Nov 6, 2007	General	Write Ins		311	2.76
Nov 3, 2009	General	Robert H. Brink	Democratic	15,366	62.31
Nov 3, 2009	General	Aaron E. Ringel	Republican	9,265	37.57
Nov 3, 2009	General	Write Ins		26	0.10
Nov 8, 2011	General	Robert H. Brink	Democratic	11,492	68.28
Nov 8, 2011	General	Kathy D. Gillette-Mallard	Independent	4,081	24.24
Nov 8, 2011	General	Janet Murphy	Independent Green	1,153	6.85
Nov 8, 2011	General	Write Ins		103	0.61
Nov 5, 2013	General	Robert H. Brink	Democratic	22,110	94.65
Nov 5, 2013	General	Write Ins		1,249	5.35
