= Anne B. Crockett-Stark =

American politician (born 1942)

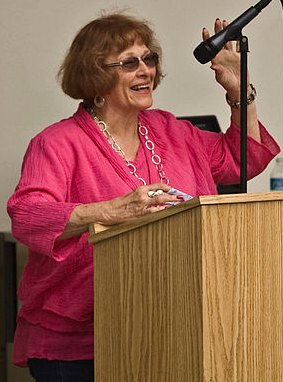
- Crockett-Stark in 2012 at the 25th anniversary of the New River Trail State Park

Member of the Virginia House of Delegates from the 6th district
- In office January 11, 2006 – January 8, 2014
- Preceded by: Benny Keister
- Succeeded by: Jeff Campbell

Personal details
- Born: Anne B. Crockett; December 12, 1942 (age 83) Wytheville, Virginia
- Party: Republican
- Spouse: Carl Stark (deceased)
- Children: Anne Carney, Susan Aker
- Education: Radford University; Virginia Tech
- Committees: Counties, Cities and Towns; Health, Welfare and Institutions; Science and Technology
- Website: annebcrockett-stark.org

Anne B. "Annie B." Crockett-Stark (born December 12, 1942) is an American politician. From 2006 to 2014, she was a Republican member of the Virginia House of Delegates representing the 6th District in the southwestern part of the state.

Crockett-Stark announced that she would not run for reelection in 2013.

== Biography ==
Anne B. Crockett was born in Wytheville, Virginia. She received a B.S. in English from Radford University in 1969, and an M.S. in community college guidance in 1979. She also did some graduate work at Virginia Tech. She worked as an educator and guidance counselor.

She married Dr. Carl E. Stark. They had two daughters, Anne C. Carney and Susan C. Aker.

== Early political career ==
Crockett-Stark started her political career in 1978, when she became the first woman elected to the Wytheville Town Council. She served on the council until 1982. She also served on the Wythe County Board of Supervisors from 1988 through 2005, and was its chair in 2003.

== House of Delegates ==
=== Electoral history ===
Crockett-Stark's first race for House of Delegates in 2005 was notable in that it was the only incumbent Democratic loss in the House during the 2005 election cycle. She defeated Benny Keister, a three-term member.

The 2011 election was the first in which she had no opponent.

Date	Election	Candidate	Party	Votes	%
Virginia House of Delegates, 6th district
Nov 8, 2005	General	A B Crockett Stark	Republican	10,615	53.80
Nov 8, 2005	General	W B Keister	Democratic	9,109	46.17
Nov 8, 2005	General	Write Ins		6	0.03
Nov 8, 2005	General	Incumbent lost; seat switched from Democratic to Republican			
Nov 6, 2007	General	Anne B. Crockett-Stark	Republican	9,319	55.64
Nov 6, 2007	General	W. F. "Bill" Thomas Jr.	Democratic	7,412	44.25
Nov 6, 2007	General	Write Ins		17	0.10
Nov 3, 2009	General	Anne B. Crockett-Stark	Republican	11,889	65.17
Nov 3, 2009	General	A. Carole Pratt	Democratic	6,331	34.70
Nov 3, 2009	General	Write Ins		22	0.12
Nov 8, 2011	General	Anne B. Crockett-Stark	Republican	15,047	98.44
Nov 8, 2011	General	Write Ins		238	1.55

==== Scandals involving campaign staff ====
During both her 2005 and 2007 campaigns, Delegate Crockett-Stark received negative press coverage for comments made by her campaign staff. In 2005, a staffer made derogatory remarks on her personal blog about "trolling for votes among 'rednecks' who resembled Bigfoot and freak show tattooed men who lived in places that looked like horror movie sets." In 2007, a local campaign staffer posted a quote on her online Facebook profile insinuating that Delegate Crockett-Stark referred to her donors using a derogatory name. Both staffers were immediately terminated.

=== Legislative record ===
==== 2006 legislative session ====
During the 2006 legislative session, Delegate Crockett-Stark proposed ten bills, two studies, and five commending resolutions. Both studies were killed, along with seven of her bills. This left Delegate Crockett-Stark with a passage rate for legislation of 25%, 47% if her commending resolutions are included.

==== 2007 legislative session ====
During the 2007 legislative session, Delegate Crockett-Stark proposed twelve bills and four commending resolutions. The 2007 legislative session was notable in that all twelve house bills proposed by Delegate Crockett-Stark were killed, giving her a 0% passage rate for legislation during the 2007 session, 25% if her commending resolutions are included.

== Interest group ratings ==
Interest group ratings for Crockett-Stark, as compiled by Project Vote Smart:

Businesses

Virginia Chamber of Commerce - 51% (2005)
Virginia FREE - 57% (2007)

Education

Virginia Education Association - 63% (2006)

Environment

Virginia League of Conservation Voters - 38% (2006)
Virginia League of Conservation Voters - 60% (2007)

Labor

Virginia AFL-CIO - 25% (2006)
Virginia AFL-CIO - 20% (2007)
