= George Hairston =

Virginia military officer, planter and politician

Member of the Virginia House of Delegates for Henry County
- In office October 16, 1786 – 1787 Serving with John Marr
- Preceded by: John Dillard
- Succeeded by: Thomas Cooper

Personal details
- Born: September 20, 1750 Marrowbone plantation, Bedford County, Colony of Virginia
- Died: March 5, 1827 (aged 76) Beaver Creek Plantation, Henry County
- Resting place: Beaver Creek Plantation, Henry County
- Spouse: Elizabeth Perkins Letcher
- Relations: George Hairston Jr.(grandson)
- Children: 10 including George Hairston
- Parent(s): Robert Hairston, Ruth Stovall

George Hairston (September 20, 1750 – March 5, 1827) was a Scotch-Irish American Virginia planter, patriot and politician in Virginia who served one term in the Virginia House of Delegates representing Henry County after serving as a Colonel in the American Revolutionary War and later served as a Brigadier General in the War of 1812. The first of three men of the same name to serve in the Virginia General Assembly, unlike the two other men (his descendants), he did not serve in the Virginia Senate, although this Hairston may be better known for building Beaver Creek Plantation, which remained his home and which he farmed using enslaved labor, or for helping to found Martinsville.

== Early life and education ==
Born on September 20, 1750 to the former Ruth Stovall (1731-1808), and her planter husband Robert Hairston (before 1724-1791) at their Marrowbone plantation in Bedford County, Virginia, (which latter became part of Henry County, Virginia). His paternal grandfather Peter Hairston had immigrated from Scotland to Pennsylvania and had established several different farms, but moved to Goochland County, Virginia in 1739 with his three surviving sons, Andrew, Samuel, and this man's father Robert Hairston. Through his mother, George could claim descent from early Virginia colonist and Captain Christopher Newport (4th great grandson) and Illiam Dhone and Fletcher Christian were distant cousins. He received an education appropriate to his class.

== Career ==
=== Planter ===
His father had established Marrowbone plantation in Henry County, which George inherited in 1791, and which would remain owned by his descendants until 1881. Meanwhile, circa 1776 (also the year that the Virginia General Assembly established Henry County), this George Hairston established Beaver Creek Plantation, reputedly purchasing 20,000 acres for ten cents per acre. Hairston (like his father) farmed using enslaved labor, owning 29 slaves at one plantation. In the 1787 Virginia tax census, George Hairston owned 23 adult slaves, 31 enslaved teenagers, as well as 34 horses and a stud horse, plus 140 cattle in Henry County.

Hairston also purchased numerous tracts of land in Henry and the later-formed but adjacent Patrick County, Virginia, such that by his death, he owned more than 20,000 acres in several southwestern Virginia counties.

In June 1791 George Hairston and James Anthony donated fifty acres of land for a courthouse and public buildings, which later became the center of Martinsville, Virginia.

=== Military officer ===
By 1755, his father had become captain of the Bedford county militia, and in 1775, George began a similar path, as lieutenant under his father, who was one of the captains of the Pittsylvania county militia. At the first meeting of the Henry county court when it was formed in 1776 (the justices of the peace jointly administering the county in that era), Hairston was appointed captain of the local militia, and will serve under Colonel Abram Penn and Major Waller at the Battle of Guilford Courthouse, when their unit came to the assistance of General Nathaneal Greene near Greensboro, North Carolina. Hairston again served under Waller during the Siege of Yorktown and was able to view the British surrender in 1781.

By the War of 1812, Hairston had attained the rank of major general in the Virginia state militia as well as held the rank of colonel in the North Carolina militia. He commanded the 3rd, 4th, 5th & 6th Virginia and the 85th North Carolina (a colonel in NC) regiments, and participated in the engagement that repulsed Robert Ross (British Army officer) who burned Washington DC and was killed at the Battle of Bladensburg.

=== Politics ===
His father had served as one of Henry County's first representatives in the Virginia House of Delegates. Henry County voters elected Hairston as sheriff, and once elected him as their representative to the Virginia House of Delegates.

== Personal life ==
Near the close of the Revolutionary War, Elizabeth Perkins Letcher and her 3 year old daughter had witnessed Tories ambush and kill her first husband, Captain William Letcher of Laurel Hill Farm, as he arrived home to visit his sick wife. This man had gathered neighbors that tracked down those Tories, convicted them after a "drumhead" court martial (the spot in Patrick County later called Drumhead), and executed them. Five months later, George married the widowed Elizabeth, on January 1, 1781, and the couple had twelve children. Their children were: Robert HAIRSTON (Apr. 1, 1783—Mar 7, 1852); Col. George "Old Rusty" HAIRSTON Jr. (Nov. 27, 1784-Oct 13, 1863); Harden HAIRSTON (Oct 23, 1786—Oct 23, 1862); Lt. Samuel HAIRSTON (Nov 19, 1788-Mar 2, 1875); Nicholas Perkins HAIRSTON (Oct 18. 1791–1824); Henry HAIRSTON (Jul 23, 1793–1825); Peter HAIRSTON (Jan 16, 1796—Oct 28, 1810); Constantine HAIRSTON (Dec 17, 1797—Feb 12, 1819); John Adams HAIRSTON (Mar 15, 1799—Sep 7 1849); America HAIRSTON (Feb 21, 1801—Mar 16, 1826); Marshall HAIRSTON (Jul 4, 1802—Jan 20, 1882) and Ruth Stovall HAIRSTON (Sep 6, 1804—Sep 20, 1838).

== Death and legacy ==
Hairston died on March 5, 1827, at his home, Beaver Creek Plantation, survived for a few years by his widow. Both are buried at the Hairston Family Cemetery there. The last will and testament that Hairston wrote on 7 March 1820, was admitted to probate on 9 April 1827. During his lifetime, his son Samuel had continued the family's political as well as planter traditions by becoming one of the delegates representing Franklin County in 1789. Another son, George Hairston Jr., and grandson George Hairston III would also continue both the family's planter tradition, and expand on his political leadership, each representing Henry County in the Virginia House of Delegates, as well as Henry and adjoining counties in the Virginia Senate.

Some of General Hairston's military order books from the War of 1812 are held by the library of the University of North Carolina.

In 1836, his grandsons John and George Hairston III and (their first cousin) Peter Hairston formed the Union Iron Works Company to develop the small-scale iron furnace on the 20,000 acres in Patrick and Henry Counties known as the "Iron Forge" that John had inherited from his father. During the 1850s the company was managed by Samuel Hairston (son of George Jr.) who consolidated the actual forge with another parcel his father had acquired in Patrick County into a parcel of 4850 acres. George Jr. deeded the parcel to Samuel Hairston in 1862 and the following year Samuel Hairston sold it to John and Elisha Barksdale and John Stovall, who in 1903 sold the "Iron Works at Union Furnace" to Frank Ayer Hill and his wife Alice and Herbert Dale Lafferty and his wife Mary, who jointly renamed the area once known as Goblintown as "Fayerdale." By 1910 the mining and logging town grew to 2000 people and had a train depot, general store, post office, hotel and school, as well as warehouses and other company buildings, homes and a doctor. However, by 1921 the iron vein had worn out and Prohibition closed the whisky distillation and transport businesses, so circa 1925 Roanoke newspaper publisher Junius Fishburn bought out his partners in the successor corporation. In 1933 Fishburn donated 4639 acres to Virginia, which with the help of the Civilian Conservation Corps created Fairy Stone State Park, one of Virginia's six original state parks.

== Bibliography ==
- DeMark, Susan. 1979. "Hairstons: A Family, a Corporation". Burlington County Times.
- "Col. George Hairston’s Obituary" The Richmond Enquirer. April 10, 1827.
- Hairston Family Bible Record. 1750. Summary: Area covered is Henry County, Virginia. Other surnames mentioned: Saunders and Wilson.
- Hairston, Elizabeth Seawell Hairston. The Hairstons and Penns and Their Relations. Roanoke, Va: [publisher not identified], 1940.
- Hairston, Peter W. The Stories of Beaver Creek: As Gleaned from Family Letters and Records. [United States]: P. Hairston, 2003.
- Harris, John B. Peter Hairston the Immigrant. [Henry County, VA]: J.B. Harris, 2002. 82 leaves: chiefly facsimiles; 28 cm.
- Records of Ante-bellum Southern Plantations from the Revolution Through the Civil War: Hairston and Wilson families. Kenneth Milton Stampp, Martin Paul Schipper, University of North Carolina at Chapel Hill. Library. Southern Historical Collection. 1993.
- Wiencek, Henry. The Hairstons: An American Family in Black and White. New York: St. Martin's Press, 1999.
