= Jed Arnold =

American politician from Virginia

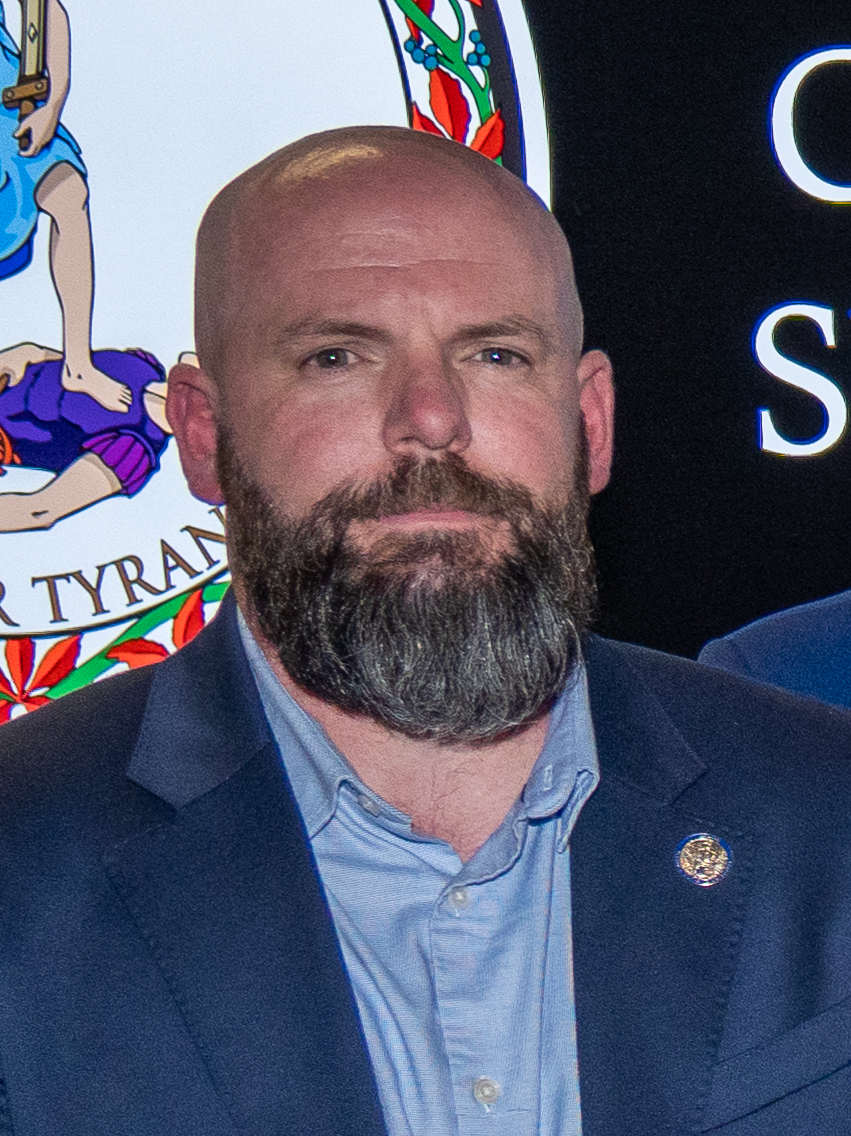
- Arnold in 2025

Member of the Virginia House of Delegates
- Incumbent
- Assumed office September 5, 2023
- Preceded by: Jeff Campbell
- Succeeded by: Mitchell Cornett
- Constituency: 6th district (2023–2024); 46th district (2024–present)

Personal details
- Party: Republican

Jed Arnold is an American politician serving as a member of the Virginia House of Delegates from the 46th district. He was elected to the 6th district in an August 2023 special election. He ran unopposed to represent the 46th district in the 2023 election.

Arnold announced that he would not seek re-election in March 2025, citing his wife's struggle with long COVID and the need to support her.
