= Henry County, Virginia =

County in Virginia, United States

- County
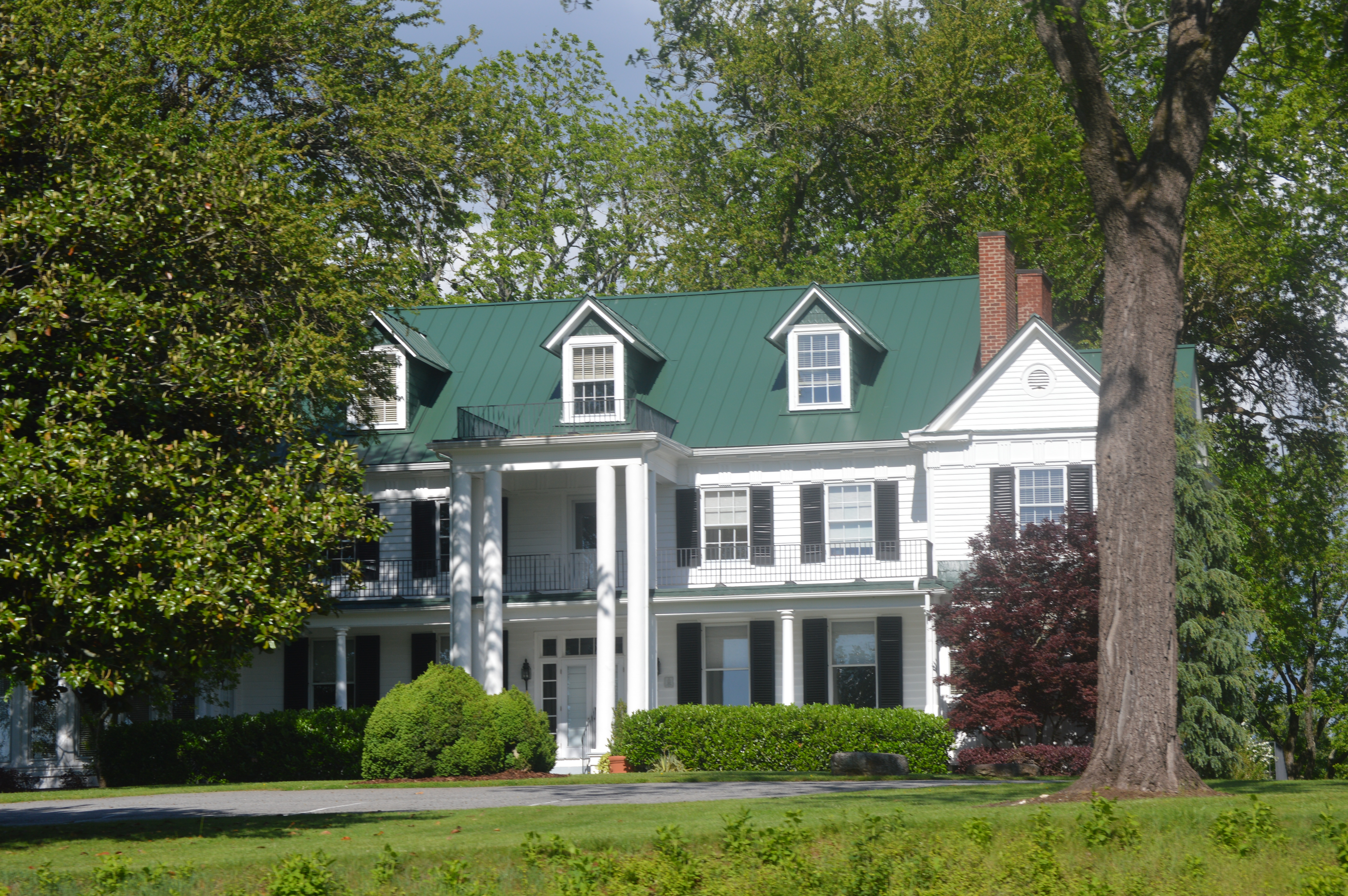
- Beaver Creek Plantation

- Flag Seal Logo

- Location within the U.S. state of Virginia
- Coordinates: 36°40′N 79°53′W
- Country: United States
- State: Virginia
- Founded: 1777
- Named for: Patrick Henry
- Seat: Martinsville (independent city)^{1}
- Largest town: Ridgeway

Area
  - Total: 384 sq mi (990 km^{2})
  - Land: 382 sq mi (990 km^{2})
  - Water: 2 sq mi (5.2 km^{2}) 0.5%

Population (2020)
  - Total: 50,948
  - Estimate (2025): 49,242 ▼
  - Density: 133/sq mi (51.5/km^{2})
- Time zone: UTC−5 (Eastern)
  - Summer (DST): UTC−4 (EDT)
- Congressional district: 9th
- Website: www.henrycountyva.gov

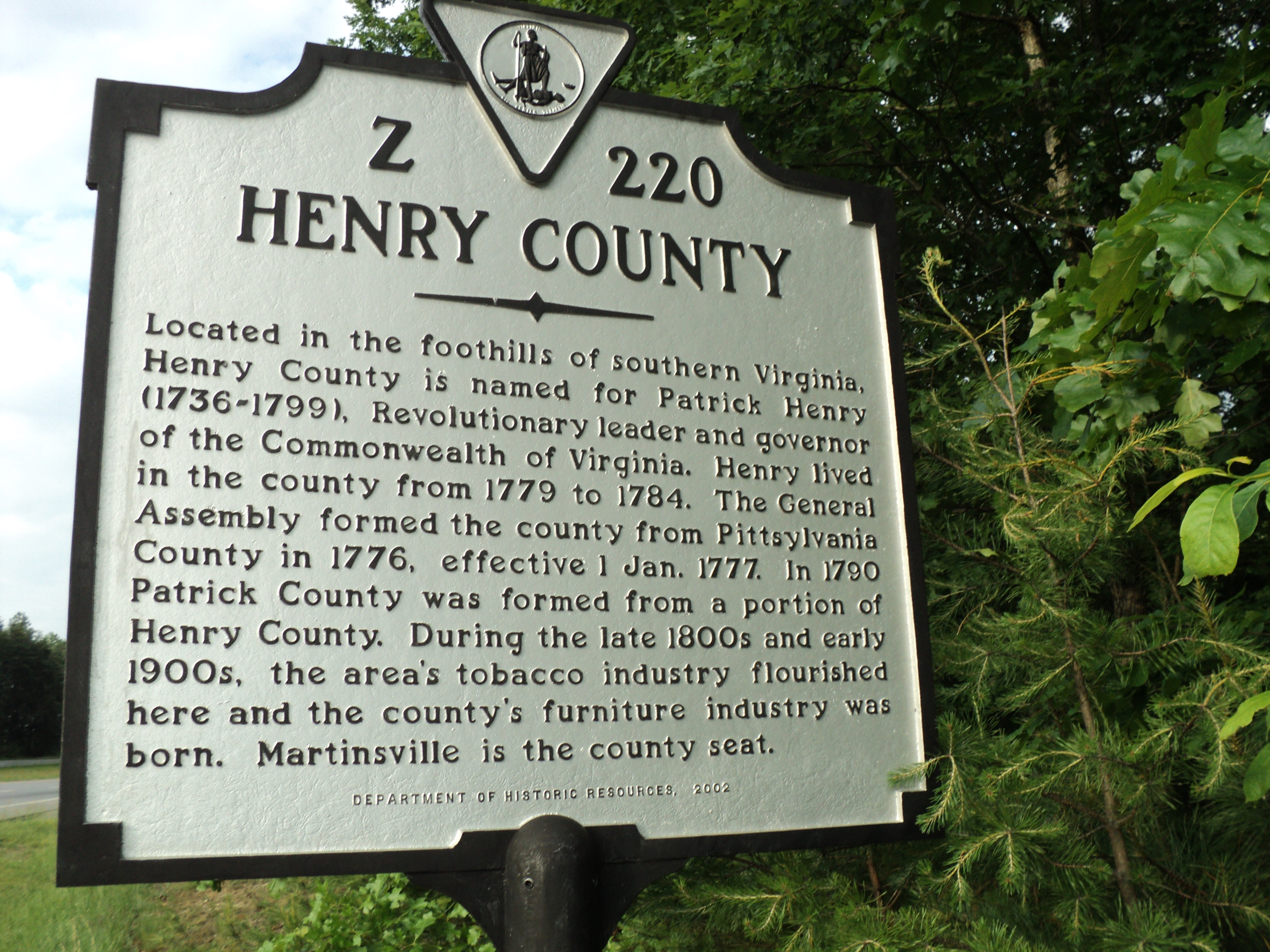
Virginia state historical marker for Henry County

Henry County is a county located in the U.S. state of Virginia. As of the 2020 census, the population was 50,948. The county seat is traditionally the independent city of Martinsville; however it is essentially a ghost seat, as the administration building (where county offices are located and where the board of supervisors holds meetings), county courthouse, and Henry County Sheriff's Office are located on Kings Mountain Road (SR 174) in Collinsville.The Henry County Adult Detention Center is located on DuPont Road in Henry County, just south of Martinsville.

Henry County is part of the Martinsville Micropolitan Statistical Area.

== History ==
The county was established in 1777 when it was carved from Pittsylvania County. The new county was initially named Patrick Henry County in honor of Patrick Henry, who was then serving as the first governor of Virginia, and some of whose relatives had settled in the area. Governor Henry also had a 10,000-acre (40 km^{2}) plantation called "Leatherwood plantation" (for Leatherwood Creek) in the newly named county (where he ended up spending 5 years between his first and second gubernatorial terms).

== Founding and Nomenclature ==
Despite common misconceptions, Henry County was never formally named "Patrick Henry County." According to The Statutes at Large; Being a Collection of All the Laws of Virginia (William Waller Hening, Vol. 9, pp. 241–242), the legislative act passed during the October 1776 session defined the new entity as follows:

"An act for dividing the county of Pittsylvania into two distinct counties... Be it therefore enacted by the General Assembly of the commonwealth of Virginia... That from and after the last day of December next ensuing the said county of Pittsylvania be divided into two counties... and that all that part of the said county which lies to the westward of the said line shall be one distinct county, and called and known by the name of Henry, and that all the other part thereof which lies to the eastward of the said line shall be one other distinct county, and retain the name Pittsylvania."

The act further mandated the establishment of local governance:

"And for the administration of justice in the said county of Henry, Be it enacted... That after the said last day of December a court for the said county of Henry be held by the justices thereof upon the third Monday in every month..."

=== Historical Analysis of the Founding Date ===
While the enabling legislation was passed in late 1776, the statutory language dictates that Henry County did not legally or operationally exist until January 1, 1777.

- Effective Date: The clause "from and after the last day of December next ensuing" establishes January 1 as the effective date of the county’s legal birth.
- Administrative Activation: The first county court—the primary body of local government and record-keeping at the time—was not authorized to meet until the third Monday of January 1777.
- Nomenclature: The legislative record confirms the county was designated solely as "Henry." While named in honor of then-Governor Patrick Henry, the formal title "Patrick Henry County" does not appear in the founding statutes.

== Early Settlers ==
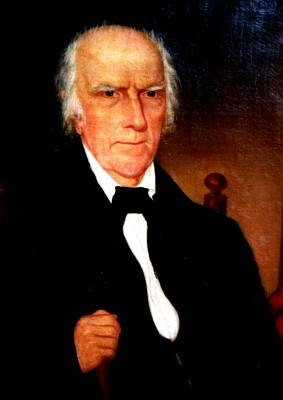
Major John Redd, Continental Army, pioneer settler of Henry County

In 1785 the northern part of Patrick Henry County was combined with part of Bedford County to form Franklin County. In 1790, Patrick Henry County was split again: the western part became Patrick County and the rest remained Henry County.

Other notable early settlers included: George Waller, Captain George Hairston and Major John Redd, all of whom were present at the surrender of General Cornwallis at Yorktown; Col. Abram Penn, a native of Amherst County, Virginia, who led his Henry County militia troops with the intention of joining General Nathanael Greene at the Battle of Guilford Courthouse during the Revolutionary War; and Brigadier General Joseph Martin, for whom Martinsville is named. Also prominent were Mordecai Hord, a native of Louisa County and explorer, who lived on his plantation called Hordsville; and Col. John Dillard, born in Amherst County, Virginia in 1751, wounded at the Battle of Princeton during the Revolution, and later a member of the Committee of Safety. Captain Robert Hairston, a noted politician in the Colony of Virginia, owned Marrowbone plantation, commanded a militia company and served as Henry County's first high sheriff.

During the War of 1812, the 64th Virginia Militia, under Captain Graves, was formed in 1815 from Henry County. Benjamin Dyer was a lieutenant, then later a captain, of the 5th company of the 64th Virginia Militia. Private Alexander Hunter Bassett would later work large tobacco plantations in the county, and Wyatt Jarrett. Tavner Hailey (b.1793) of Martinsville became an early pioneer in Tennessee and served in the War of 1812. He was 1st Cpl. in Captain Brice Edward's Company, 64th Regiment, Virginia Militia."

During the American Civil War, the 42nd Virginia Infantry was formed in part from Henry County volunteers. Its state senator, Christopher Y. Thomas, owned Henry's former Leatherwood plantation and would later briefly serve in the U.S. House of Representatives after the war. He was succeeded by George Cabell, a Confederate army veteran (38th Virginia Infantry) born in nearby Danville and from a family long prominent in the area.

In 1902, the Henry County Historical Society was incorporated at Martinsville with its first officers being John W. Carter, J. Harrison Spencer and C. B. Bryant.

== Geography ==
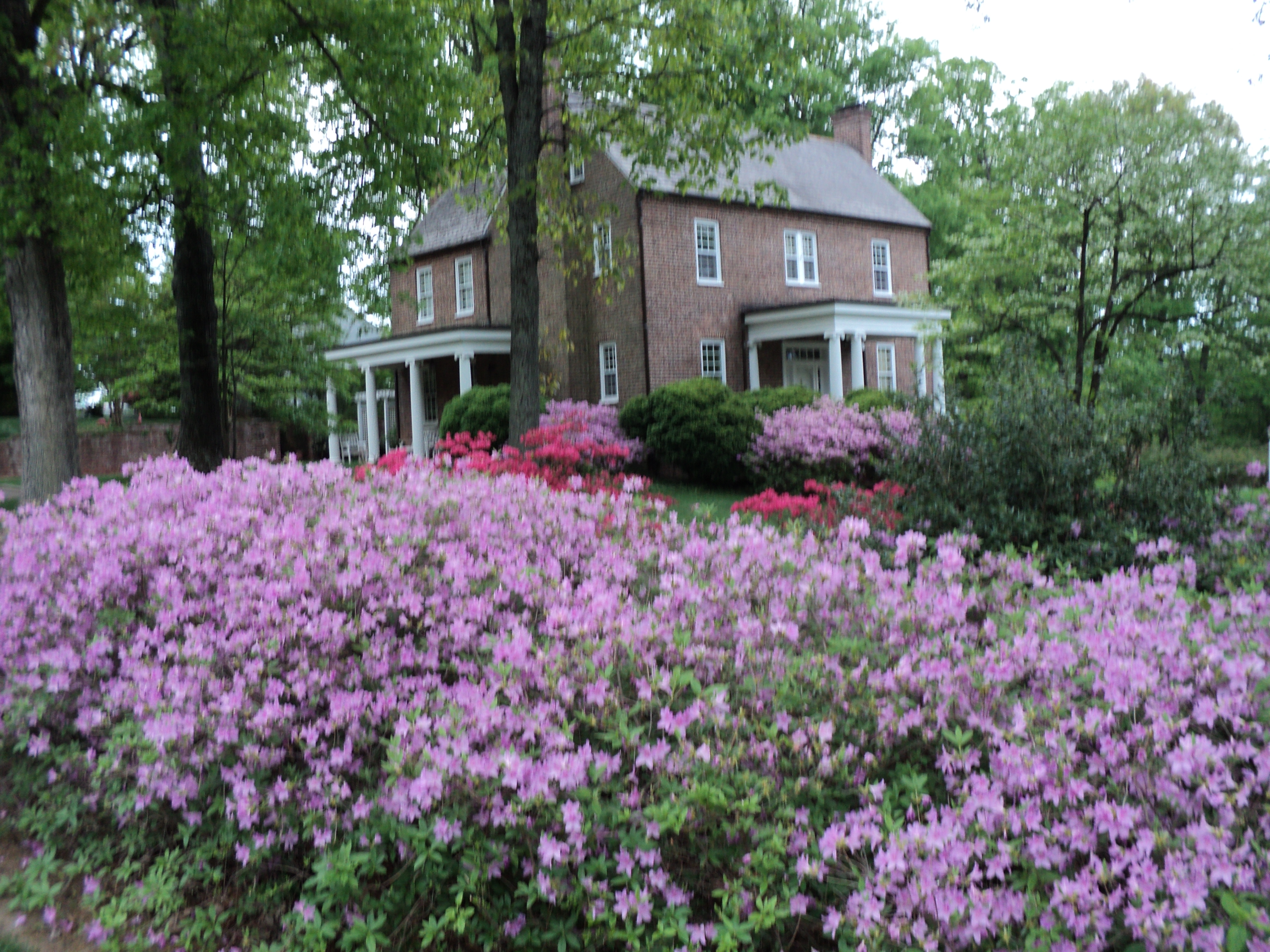
Greenwood, built by Col. Joseph Martin, son of General Joseph Martin, namesake of Martinsville, at Axton, Henry County, 1808–1810

According to the U.S. Census Bureau, the county has a total area of 384 square miles (990 km^{2}), of which 382 square miles (990 km^{2}) is land and 2 square miles (5.2 km^{2}) (0.5%) is water. Henry County is one of the 423 counties served by the Appalachian Regional Commission, and it is identified as part of "Greater Appalachia" by Colin Woodard in his book American Nations: A History of the Eleven Rival Regional Cultures of North America.

=== Districts ===
The county's six districts are as follows, in alphabetical order: Axton, Bassett, Collinsville, Horsepasture, Reed Creek, and Ridgeway.

=== Adjacent counties ===
- Franklin County - north
- Pittsylvania County - east
- Rockingham County, North Carolina - south
- Stokes County, North Carolina - southwest
- Patrick County - west
- Martinsville - surrounded by Henry County

=== Major highways ===
- I-73 (rescinded project)
- US 58
- US 220
- SR 57
- SR 87
- SR 108
- SR 174
- SR 457

== Demographics ==
Historical population
Census	Pop.	Note	%±
1790	8,479		—
1800	5,259		−38.0%
1810	5,611		6.7%
1820	5,624		0.2%
1830	7,100		26.2%
1840	7,335		3.3%
1850	8,872		21.0%
1860	12,105		36.4%
1870	12,303		1.6%
1880	16,009		30.1%
1890	18,208		13.7%
1900	19,265		5.8%
1910	18,459		−4.2%
1920	20,238		9.6%
1930	20,088		−0.7%
1940	26,481		31.8%
1950	31,219		17.9%
1960	40,335		29.2%
1970	50,901		26.2%
1980	57,654		13.3%
1990	56,942		−1.2%
2000	57,930		1.7%
2010	54,151		−6.5%
2020	50,948		−5.9%
2025 (est.)	49,242	▼	−3.3%
U.S. Decennial Census; 1790-1960 1900-1990; 1990-2000 2010 2020

=== Racial and ethnic composition ===
Henry County, Virginia – Racial and ethnic composition Note: the US Census treats Hispanic/Latino as an ethnic category. This table excludes Latinos from the racial categories and assigns them to a separate category. Hispanics/Latinos may be of any race.
Race / Ethnicity (NH = Non-Hispanic)	Pop 1980	Pop 1990	Pop 2000	Pop 2010	Pop 2020	% 1980	% 1990	% 2000	% 2010	% 2020
White alone (NH)	43,910	43,396	42,087	38,737	34,307	76.16%	76.21%	72.65%	71.54%	67.34%
Black or African American alone (NH)	13,306	13,119	13,080	11,786	11,062	23.08%	23.04%	22.58%	21.77%	21.71%
Native American or Alaska Native alone (NH)	25	60	83	78	68	0.04%	0.11%	0.14%	0.14%	0.13%
Asian alone (NH)	32	103	218	236	284	0.06%	0.18%	0.38%	0.44%	0.56%
Native Hawaiian or Pacific Islander alone (NH)	x	x	8	2	6	x	x	0.01%	0.00%	0.01%
Other race alone (NH)	38	11	47	43	153	0.07%	0.02%	0.08%	0.08%	0.30%
Mixed race or Multiracial (NH)	x	x	405	724	1,767	x	x	0.70%	1.34%	3.47%
Hispanic or Latino (any race)	343	253	2,002	2,545	3,301	0.59%	0.44%	3.46%	4.70%	6.48%
Total	57,654	56,942	57,930	54,151	50,948	100.00%	100.00%	100.00%	100.00%	100.00%

=== 2020 census ===
As of the 2020 census, the county had a population of 50,948. The median age was 47.6 years. 19.4% of residents were under the age of 18 and 24.0% of residents were 65 years of age or older. For every 100 females there were 93.2 males, and for every 100 females age 18 and over there were 90.7 males age 18 and over.

The racial makeup of the county was 68.8% White, 21.9% Black or African American, 0.3% American Indian and Alaska Native, 0.6% Asian, 0.0% Native Hawaiian and Pacific Islander, 3.2% from some other race, and 5.2% from two or more races. Hispanic or Latino residents of any race comprised 6.5% of the population.

34.9% of residents lived in urban areas, while 65.1% lived in rural areas.

There were 22,199 households in the county, of which 24.1% had children under the age of 18 living with them and 31.7% had a female householder with no spouse or partner present. About 32.7% of all households were made up of individuals and 16.1% had someone living alone who was 65 years of age or older.

There were 25,422 housing units, of which 12.7% were vacant. Among occupied housing units, 72.0% were owner-occupied and 28.0% were renter-occupied. The homeowner vacancy rate was 1.7% and the rental vacancy rate was 10.2%.

=== 2000 Census ===
As of the census of 2000, there were 57,930 people, 23,910 households, and 16,952 families residing in the county. The population density was 152 people per square mile (59 people/km^{2}). There were 25,921 housing units at an average density of 68 units per square mile (26 units/km^{2}). The racial makeup of the county was 89.47% White, 10% Black or African American, 0.16% Native American, 0.41% Asian, 0.03% Pacific Islander, 1.39% from other races, and 0.92% from two or more races. 3.46% of the population were Hispanic or Latino of any race.

There were 23,910 households, out of which 28.60% had children under the age of 18 living with them, 54.30% were married couples living together, 12.20% had a female householder with no husband present, and 29.10% were non-families. 25.80% of all households were made up of individuals, and 10.30% had someone living alone who was 65 years of age or older. The average household size was 2.40 and the average family size was 2.87.

In the county, the population was spread out, with 22.30% under the age of 18, 7.50% from 18 to 24, 29.00% from 25 to 44, 26.10% from 45 to 64, and 15.00% who were 65 years of age or older. The median age was 39 years. For every 100 females, there were 95.10 males. For every 100 females age 18 and over, there were 93.00 males.

The median income for a household in the county was $31,816, and the median income for a family was $38,649. Males had a median income of $26,660 versus $20,766 for females. The per capita income for the county was $17,110. About 8.80% of families and 11.70% of the population were below the poverty line, including 15.20% of those under age 18 and 12.60% of those age 65 or over.

== Government ==
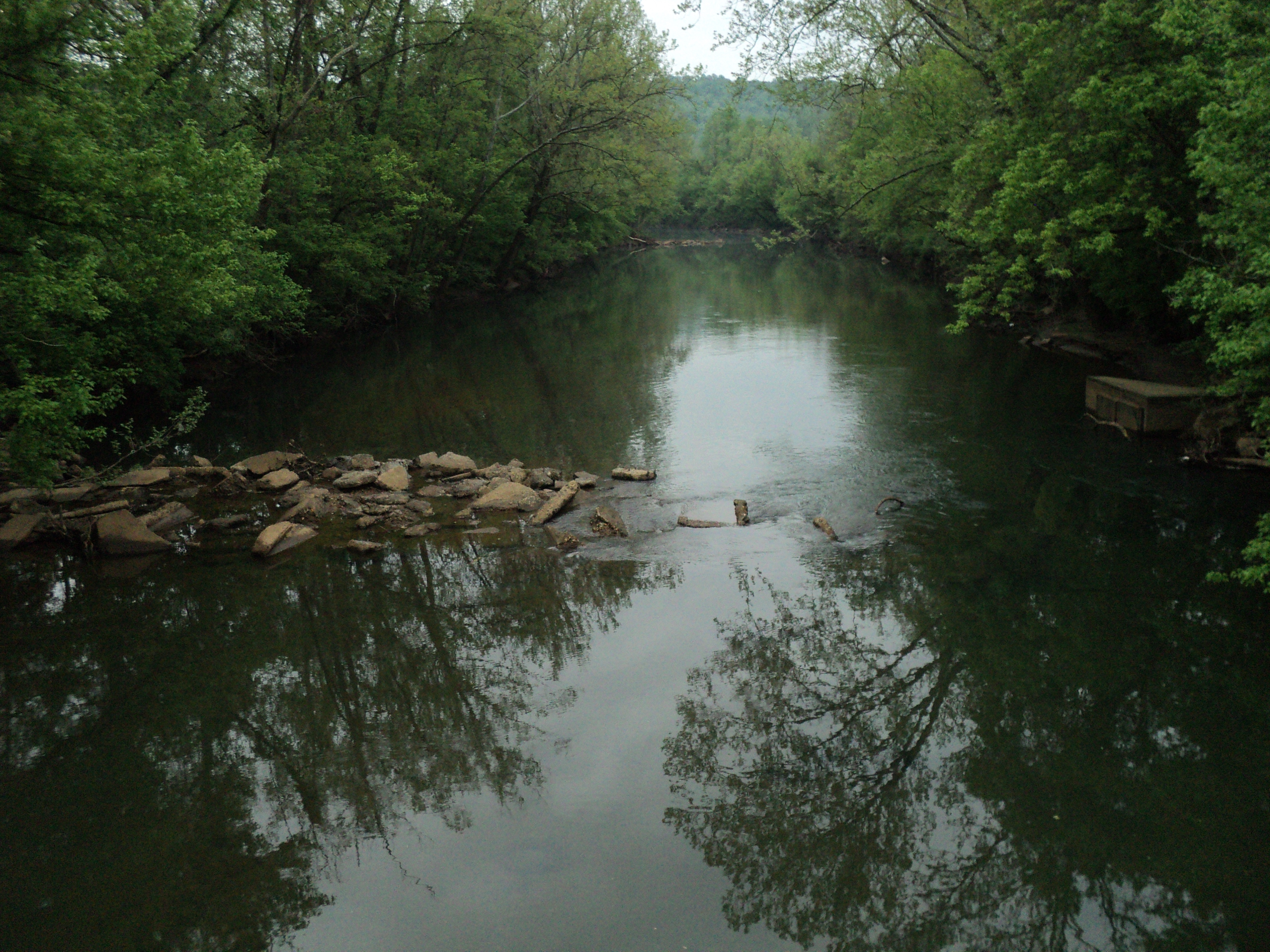
View of the Smith River from bridge at Fieldale, Henry County

=== Board of supervisors ===
- Blackberry District: Jimmie L. "Jim" Adams (I)
- Collinsville District: Chris Lawless (I)
- Horsepasture District: Debra Parsons Buchanan (I)
- Iriswood District: Garrett Dillard (I)
- Reed Creek District: T.J. "Tommy" Slaughter (I)
- Ridgeway District: Ryan Zehr (I)

=== Constitutional officers ===
- Clerk of the Circuit Court: Jennifer Ashworth (I)
- Commissioner of the Revenue: Tiffany R. Hairston (I)
- Commonwealth's Attorney: Andrew Nester (I)
- Sheriff: D. Wayne Davis Jr. (I)
- Treasurer: Scott B. Grindstaff (I)
- General Registrar: Dawn Stultz-Vaughn

Henry County is represented by Republican William M. "Bill" Stanley in the Virginia Senate, Republicans Wren Williams and Eric Phillips in the Virginia House of Delegates, and Republican H. Morgan Griffith in the U.S. House of Representatives.

=== Law enforcement ===
The Henry County Sheriff's Office (HCSO) is the primary law enforcement agency in Henry County.

Robert Hairston was appointed the first "High sheriff" by Governor Thomas Nelson Jr. when Henry County was formed in 1777. Alexander Hunter also served as sheriff of Henry County for one year in 1803.

In 2006, a federal Grand Jury charged 20 defendants for their roles in a racketeering conspiracy that included the distribution of illegal drugs, theft of drugs and firearms under the custody of the Henry County Sheriff's Office, money laundering, and obstruction of justice. Thirteen of the twenty defendants were current or former employees of the Sheriff's Office. Eighteen of the defendants, including sheriff Frank Cassell, were convicted of felony offenses. This case, United States v. Frank Cassell, was prosecuted by US Attorney John L. Brownlee.

== Politics ==
United States presidential election results for Henry County, Virginia
Year	Republican		Democratic		Third party(ies)	
Year	No.	%	No.	%	No.	%
1912	216	16.58%	707	54.26%	380	29.16%
1916	567	39.68%	851	59.55%	11	0.77%
1920	698	44.04%	871	54.95%	16	1.01%
1924	565	33.29%	1,097	64.64%	35	2.06%
1928	1,139	47.34%	1,267	52.66%	0	0.00%
1932	342	22.75%	1,146	76.25%	15	1.00%
1936	458	20.34%	1,790	79.48%	4	0.18%
1940	474	20.79%	1,795	78.73%	11	0.48%
1944	727	32.03%	1,538	67.75%	5	0.22%
1948	730	28.77%	1,318	51.95%	489	19.27%
1952	1,871	44.34%	2,323	55.05%	26	0.62%
1956	2,436	47.75%	2,582	50.61%	84	1.65%
1960	2,323	41.17%	3,306	58.59%	14	0.25%
1964	2,844	34.75%	5,295	64.70%	45	0.55%
1968	3,946	25.92%	4,175	27.42%	7,103	46.66%
1972	7,556	62.84%	4,042	33.62%	426	3.54%
1976	5,612	35.02%	9,680	60.41%	732	4.57%
1980	8,258	46.44%	8,800	49.49%	725	4.08%
1984	12,693	63.76%	6,976	35.04%	237	1.19%
1988	10,871	58.04%	7,536	40.24%	322	1.72%
1992	9,005	41.26%	9,296	42.59%	3,524	16.15%
1996	9,110	43.64%	9,061	43.41%	2,703	12.95%
2000	11,870	55.30%	8,898	41.46%	695	3.24%
2004	13,358	56.94%	9,851	41.99%	249	1.06%
2008	13,758	54.56%	11,118	44.09%	339	1.34%
2012	13,984	56.02%	10,317	41.33%	662	2.65%
2016	15,208	63.09%	8,198	34.01%	700	2.90%
2020	16,725	64.07%	9,127	34.96%	253	0.97%
2024	16,800	65.95%	8,457	33.20%	217	0.85%

== Communities ==
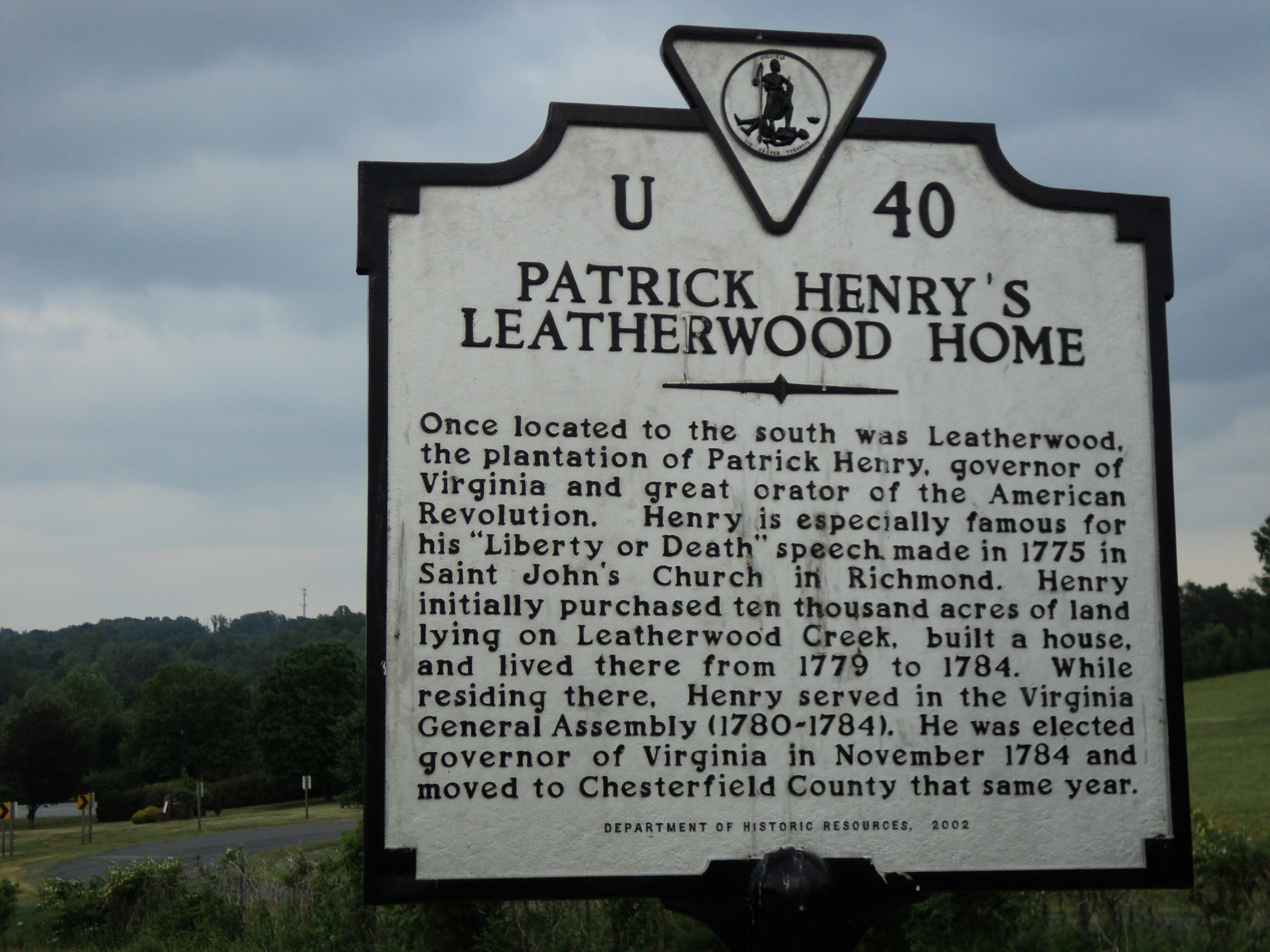
Virginia state historic marker for plantation of Patrick Henry, county's namesake, Leatherwood, Henry County

As an independent city since 1928, Martinsville is not part of Henry County, but exists as an enclave, surrounded by the county.

=== Town ===
- Ridgeway

=== Census-designated places ===
- Bassett
- Chatmoss
- Collinsville
- Fieldale
- Horsepasture
- Laurel Park
- Oak Level
- Sandy Level
- Stanleytown
- Villa Heights

=== Other unincorporated communities ===
- Axton
- Preston
- Spencer

== Notable people ==
- Ward Armstrong
- Alexander Hunter Bassett
- John D. Bassett
- John Breathitt
- Thomas G. Burch
- H. Clay Earles
- Patrick Henry
- Jeff Hensley
- Jimmy Hensley
- J. C. Martin
- Joseph Martin (general)
- Otis Martin
- Barry Michaels
- Shawn Moore
- Abram Penn
- A. L. Philpott
- Carr Waller Pritchett Sr.
- Robert Hairston
- Rodney Sawyers
- Jessamine Shumate
- Thomas B. Stanley
- John H. Traylor
- Christopher Thomas
- Anne Spencer

== See also ==
- National Register of Historic Places listings in Henry County, Virginia
