= Marrowbone plantation =

Coordinates: 36°34′51.9″N 79°53′10.8″W

"Marrowbone" is a plantation house in Martinsville, Virginia, that may have been established in 1749. A frame house painted white, Marrowbone plantation was known widely for its hanging gardens and colonial boxwoods and cedars. John D. Rockefeller's gardeners scoured the countryside for authentic boxwoods or Buxus sempervirens for Colonial Williamsburg, and used some of the shrubs and cedars from Marrowbone for the restoration.

Robert Hairston established the first Hairston home in Henry county, "Marrowbone", during the period of 1775-1776. Marrowbone was passed down to his son George Hairston, and remained in the family for the next five generations, until 1881. "Following the calamities of the War Between the States, this splendid property passed out of the hands of the former owners and has been allowed to deteriorate beyond recognition." Other accounts say that Marrowbone plantation was constructed in 1759, in Pittsylvania County, Virginia, which later became part of Henry County, Virginia. A third account claims the house was built in 1749.
