= Virginia's 48th House of Delegates district =

Virginia legislative district

District map from the 2023 election

Virginia's 48th House of Delegates district elects one of 100 seats in the lower house of the state's bicameral legislature, the General Assembly. District 48 represents parts of Henry and Pittsylvania counties, and the entirety of the City of Martinsville. The seat is currently held by Republican Eric Phillips.

== List of delegates ==
Delegate	Party	Years	Electoral history
Robert H. Brink	Democratic	January 14, 1998 – June 30, 2014	Resigned to serve in the administration of governor Terry McAuliffe.
Rip Sullivan	Democratic	September 12, 2014 – January 10, 2024	First elected in a 2014 special election after his predecessor's resignation. Redistricted to the 6th District.
Eric Phillips	Republican	January 10, 2024 - Current	First elected in a 2024 special election after his predecessor's resignation.
