= Mitchell Cornett =

American politician

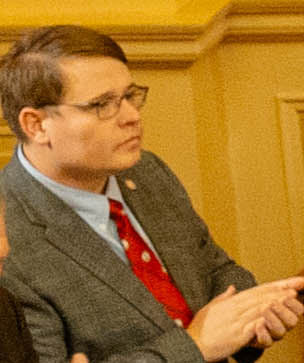

Member of the Virginia House of Delegates from the 46th district
- Incumbent
- Assumed office January 14, 2026
- Preceded by: Jed Arnold

Grayson County Supervisor for the at-large district
- Incumbent
- Assumed office 2024
- Preceded by: John Fant

Personal details
- Party: Republican
- Website: www.cornettfordelegate.com

Mitchell Cornett is an American politician who was elected as a member of the Virginia House of Delegates in 2025. He is a member of the Republican Party. Cornett is a cattle farmer and small business owner.
