= Rip Sullivan =

American politician

Member of the Virginia House of Delegates
- Incumbent
- Assumed office September 12, 2014
- Preceded by: Robert H. Brink
- Constituency: 48th district (2014–2024); 6th district (2024–present)

Virginia House Democratic Caucus Chair
- Incumbent
- Assumed office January 2020

Personal details
- Born: Richard Cyril Sullivan, Jr. March 14, 1959 (age 67) New York, New York, U.S.
- Party: Democratic
- Spouse: Elizabeth
- Children: 4
- Education: Amherst College (B.A.); University of Virginia (J.D.)
- Profession: Community activist
- Website: www.ripsullivan.com

Richard Cyril "Rip" Sullivan, Jr. (born March 14, 1959) is an American activist serving as a member of the Virginia House of Delegates from the 6th district, which encompasses parts of Arlington and Fairfax counties. Sullivan is a member of the Democratic Party.

== Background ==
Sullivan and his future wife Beth graduated from Langley High School in 1977. After graduating magna cum laude from Amherst College in 1981, he earned a Juris Doctor degree from the University of Virginia School of Law in 1987.

Sullivan has practiced law in Northern Virginia for nearly 30 years, most notably with law firm Reed Smith LLP. Following his election, Sullivan left Reed Smith and joined the Arlington-based firm of Bean Kinney & Korman. Prior to becoming a lawyer, Sullivan helped create the United States Institute of Peace. Sullivan currently serves on the Chairman's Advisory Board of the Institute. He has served on numerous local, regional, and statewide boards and commissions.

Sullivan is the former president of Northern Virginia Legal Services, an organization that provides free counsel to low-income residents.

In 2020, Sullivan introduced and helped pass the Virginia Clean Economy Act, which was signed into law on April 11, 2020.

== Political career ==
=== 2007 campaign ===
The 34th district race was one of the most expensive local campaigns in Virginia in 2007 because of Vince Callahan's political influence in Richmond. The race was targeted as a prime pickup opportunity by the Virginia Democratic Party. Democrat Margaret Vanderhye, a community activist from McLean, Virginia, announced her candidacy along with Sullivan in the Democratic primary. In the primary election on June 12, 2007, Vanderhye defeated Sullivan by 149 votes, according to the State Board of Elections. Vanderhye went on to win the general election, but was defeated in 2009 by Republican Barbara Comstock.

=== 2014 campaign ===
On June 29, 2014, Rip announced his candidacy for a special election for Virginia's 48th House of Delegates district to fill the seat of longtime Delegate Robert Brink, who resigned to take a job in the McAuliffe administration. On July 6, Sullivan won a firehouse primary over six other candidates to become the Democratic nominee for the seat. On August 19, Sullivan won in a landslide victory over opponent Dave Foster, winning by more than 24 points and winning every single precinct in the 48th District.

=== Electoral history ===
Date	Election	Candidate	Party	Votes	%
Virginia House of Delegates, 34th district
June 12, 2007	Democratic Primary	Margaret Vanderhye	Democratic	1,727	52.3
June 12, 2007	Democratic Primary	Richard C. Sullivan, Jr.	Democratic	1,578	47.7
Virginia House of Delegates, 48th district
August 19, 2014	Special	Richard C. Sullivan, Jr.	Democratic	5,978	62.22
August 19, 2014	Special	David M. Foster	Republican	3,621	37.69
August 19, 2014	Special	Write Ins		8	0.08
August 19, 2014	Special	Robert Brink resigned; seat stayed Democratic			
November 3, 2015	General	Richard C. Sullivan, Jr.	Democratic	13,141	95.36
November 3, 2015	General	Write Ins		640	4.64
November 7, 2017	General	Richard C. Sullivan, Jr.	Democratic	27,670	94.62
November 7, 2017	General	Write Ins		1,573	5.38
November 5, 2019	General	Richard C. Sullivan, Jr.	Democratic	19,762	94.18
November 5, 2019	General	Write Ins		1,221	5.82
November 2, 2021	General	Richard C. Sullivan, Jr.	Democratic	28,545	72.13
November 2, 2021	General	David M. Foster	Republican	10,937	27.63
November 2, 2021	General	Write Ins		95	0.24
