= Benny Keister =

American politician (1941–2024)

- Official portrait

Member of the Virginia House of Delegates
- In office January 12, 2000 – January 11, 2006
- Preceded by: Tommy Baker
- Succeeded by: Anne B. Crockett-Stark
- Constituency: 7th district (2000–2002); 6th district (2002–2006)

Mayor of Dublin, Virginia
- In office 1989–1997

Member of Dublin City Council
- In office 1986–1989

Personal details
- Born: Walter Benjamin Keister; March 13, 1941 Radford, Virginia, U.S.
- Died: March 23, 2024 (aged 83) Dublin, Virginia, U.S.
- Party: Democratic
- Children: Bo Keister
- Occupation: Teacher; politician

Walter Benjamin Keister Sr. (March 13, 1941 – March 23, 2024) was an American politician who served as the mayor of Dublin, Virginia, from 1989 to 1997 and as a Virginia Delegate from 2000 to 2005.

== Early life and career ==
Walter Benjamin Keister Sr. was born on March 13, 1941, in Radford, Virginia, to Mary Bain and Walter H. Keister (1907–1961). He started his career as a science teacher. Keister's political career began when he was elected a member of Dublin City Council in 1986. Keister was elected the mayor of Dublin, Virginia, in 1989 and held office until 1997. Keister later served as a Virginia delegate from 2000 to 2005, representing the 6th and 7th districts as a Democrat. Keister was the last Democrat to win either district, until their locations were changed in the run-up to the 2023 Virginia House of Delegates election.

== Personal life and death ==
Keister's son Bo Keister is an actor who had a small role in Remember the Titans.

Keister died in Dublin, Virginia, on March 23, 2024, at age 83.
