= Abram Penn =

American landowner and soldier

- Born: 1743; Caroline County, Virginia
- Died: 1801 (aged 57–58); Patrick County, Virginia
- Other name: Abraham Penn
- Occupations: landowner, soldier

Abram Penn, also known as "Abraham Penn" (December 27, 1743, in Caroline County, Virginia – 1801, in Patrick County, Virginia) was a noted landowner and Revolutionary War officer from Virginia.

== Family life ==
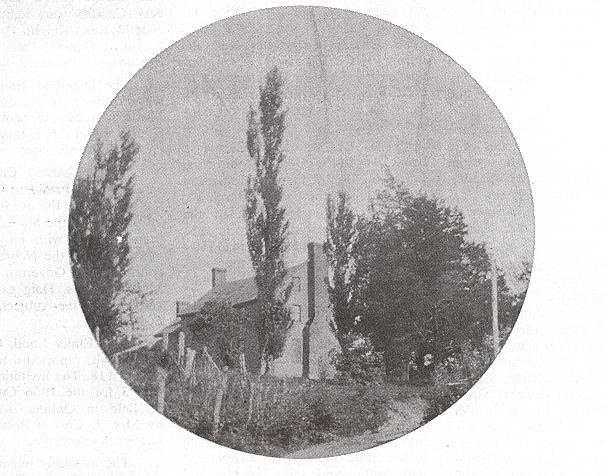
Poplar Grove Plantation, c. 1890

He married Ruth Stovall (1743- 1800?), and they had seven sons. Their children were: 1. George Penn, married Miss Gordon and moved to New Orleans. 2. Lucinda Penn, married Samuel Staples. 3. Gabriel Penn, married Jinsy Clark, of Patrick Co., VA. 4. Horatio Penn, born in Patrick County, Virginia on November 14, 1775, and died on September 27, 1838. He married Nancy Parr and moved to Missouri. They are buried at the Penn Cemetery in Ralls County, Missouri (8 miles East of New London). 5. Polly Penn, married Charles Foster, of Patrick Co., VA. 6. George Greensville (or Green) Penn, married 1st Miss Leath, of Manchester, VA; 2nd Martha Reed of Bedford Co., VA. 7. Thomas Jefferson Penn, married 1st Frances Leath of Manchester, VA; 2nd Mary Christian Kennerly, of Amherst Co., VA. 8. Abram Penn, married Sally Critz and moved to Tennessee. 9. James Penn, married 1st Miss Leath, of Manchester, VA; 2nd Mary Shelton, d/o William & Pattie (Dillard) Shelton. 10. Luvenia Penn, died young. 11. Edmund Penn, married Pollie Ferris of Patrick Co., VA. and moved to Kentucky. 12. Phillip Penn, born in March 1792 and married Louise Briscoe of Bedford Co., VA.

They made their home at "Poplar Grove" plantation in Patrick County, Virginia. The plantation is no longer standing, although the grave of Colonel Penn is still in the family cemetery on this site.

== Lord Dunmore's War ==
Abram Penn served with General Andrew Lewis (soldier) at the Battle of Point Pleasant in Lord Dunmore's War, 1774. "Abram Penn served Virginia as Captain of the Militia in Dunmores Campaign against the Shawnee Indians. He commanded a fort at Culbertson's Bottom and a company in the Battle of Point Pleasant, in which the Indians were defeated October 10th 1774."

== Political life ==
He lived as a landowner in Pittsylvania County, Virginia (later formed into Henry County, Virginia, where he served on the Committees of safety (American Revolution) in both counties and as delegate to the Virginia House of Burgesses from Henry County, along with Robert Hairston.

Commissioned by the Governor, he administered State and Federal oaths to the officers of Patrick County at its first court, June 1791. In the early years of the county, Abram Penn and seven of his sons served as "Gentlemen Justices."

== Revolutionary War soldier ==
He formed a militia company in the county and was made Captain in 1779. During the Revolutionary War, Penn advanced to the rank of Colonel and in the winter of 1780–1781, organized the only body of Revolutionary troops from Henry and adjoining counties. He led his regiment to join General Nathanael Greene in North Carolina, March 1781, for the Battle of Guilford Court House but arrived a day late and met the retreating forces heading back home. Later he and his troops joined General Greene in defense of the Carolinas, fought in the Battle of Eutaw Springs, and continued in service through the surrender of Lord Cornwallis at Yorktown.

His service in the American Revolution is summed up by a local historian: "He was a man of resolute purpose, magnetic, with a vigorous intellect and a commanding presence. When one considers how he gathered up men from this section drilled them into soldiers, and fought them like veterans against the British, he is in a class by himself, and should be forever honored as the highest type of patriot in the wilds of the forest primeval. He died in 1801, and was buried at Poplar Grove in Patrick. To his descendants, he left his sword brought back from Yorktown, and a name that will be cherished by his countrymen through the ages."

The Daughters of the American Revolution have given him the Ancestor Number: A088474 in recognition of his service.

== Legacy ==
There is a historical marker placed by the Virginia Department of Historical Resources at Patrick Springs, Virginia. It reads: "Col. Abram Penn, 1743-1801. 200 yards south is "Poplar Grove," Penn's old home and burial place. At age 21 he "won his spurs" leading a company under General Lewis at Point Pleasant. During 1780-81 he organized the first Revolutionary troops from Henry and adjoining counties, and led his regiment to aid General Greene in the Battle of Guilford Court House and the Battle of Eutaw Springs. He helped organize Patrick County."

The Patrick County chapter of the Daughters of the American Revolution in Stuart, Virginia, is named in his honor.

The unincorporated community of Penn's Store is named for Col. Penn and his descendants. The Abram Penn Highway in Patrick County is also named for Col. Penn, who died in 1801.
