= Beaver Creek Plantation =

Historic house in Virginia, United States

- U.S. National Register of Historic Places
- Virginia Landmarks Register
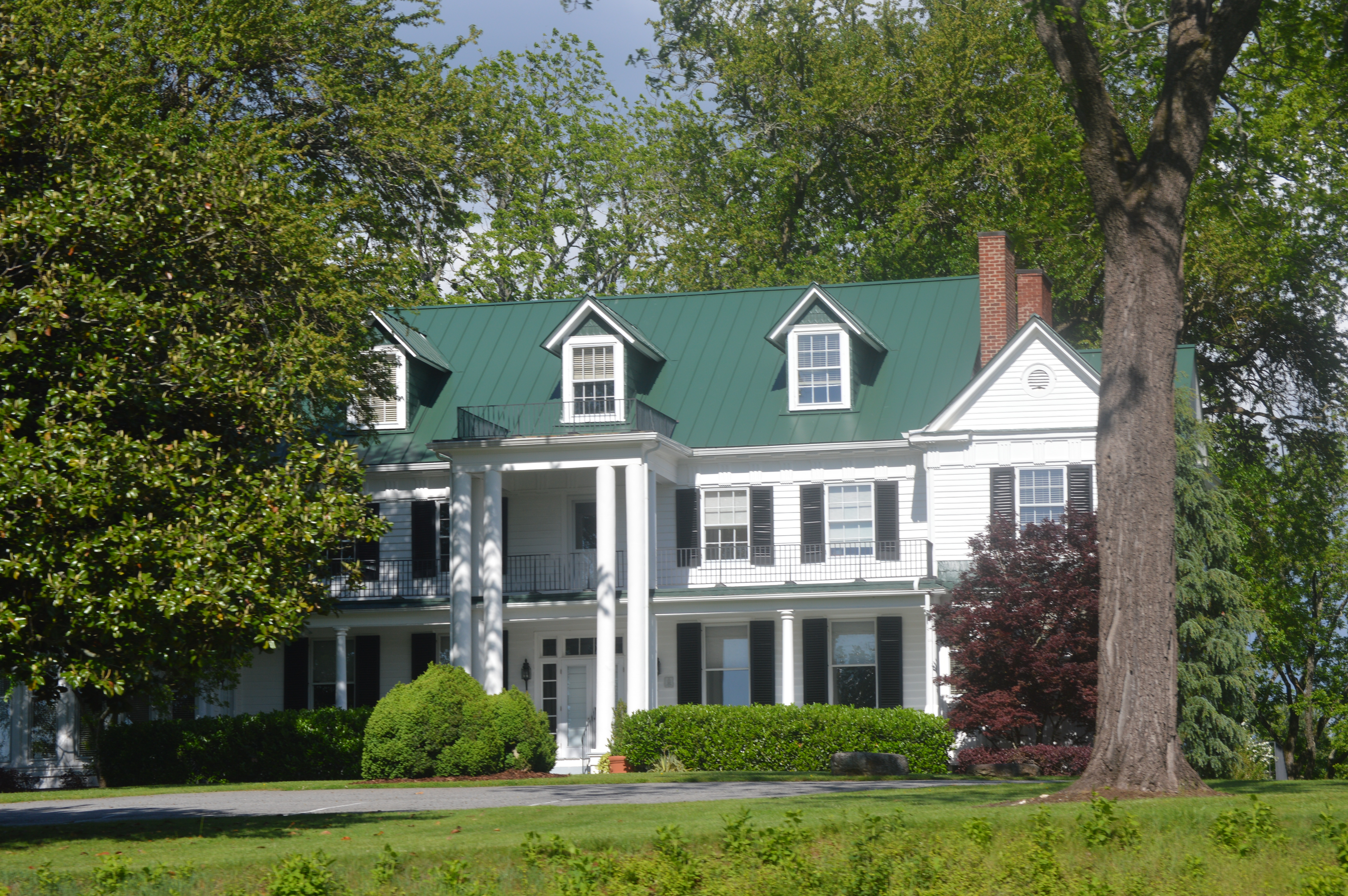
- Front of the house

- Location within Virginia Location within the United States
- Location: VA 108, Martinsville, Virginia
- Coordinates: 36°43′10″N 79°52′52″W
- Area: 11.7 acres (4.7 ha)
- Built: 1839
- Architectural style: Classical Revival
- NRHP reference No.: 85000984
- VLR No.: 044-0001

Significant dates
- Added to NRHP: May 9, 1985
- Designated VLR: April 16, 1985

Beaver Creek Plantation, under the ownership of George Hairston, was a large slave-holding tobacco plantation and the center of an empire in tobacco-growing and slave-trading built by the Hairston family, Scottish emigrants to Pennsylvania in the early 18th century. Located just outside today's Martinsville, Virginia, the plantation thrived in tobacco production and textile manufacturing, as well as producing household goods and raising livestock. At one point the enslaved blacks of Beaver Creek were tending a thousand yam plants; in one day they made 660 candles.

== History ==
Beaver Creek was built in 1776 under the ownership of George Hairston, son of Robert Hairston and Ruth Stovall Hairston, on a 30,000-plus acre royal land grant initially purchased from Col. Abram Penn. The original house was destroyed by fire in 1837 and was rebuilt while owned by George Hairston's son Marshall, whose profile according to family legend was incised on a window of the home when he was struck by lightning. The house was rebuilt using virgin oak from nearby Henry County forests.

Much of the plantation's rich slave history remains intact, and stories of unusual slaves are well documented and accessible. Often noted is the tale of Sam Lion, a field hand on the plantation. Over the years, Lion had earned enough extra money to buy his own woodworking tools. However, when a new overseer asked to borrow one of the tools, Lion refused. The overseer attacked him, and Lion killed the man with a shovel he was using to chop kindling. Lion fled the plantation, and hid in a nearby forest for two months. Eventually, unwilling to go North without his family, Lion turned himself in. He was sentenced to hang, and was shot while trying to escape.

Like Lion, other slaves were able to earn small amounts of money outside of their daily duties. Ned and Clem, two wagon masters, earned money by hauling extra loads for other planters. Clem was also a beekeeper, and amassed enough savings to buy his own honey press, which cost $10 and two gallons of honey.

Although slave rebellions were typically few, Beaver Creek was almost home to such an uprising. In 1812, a slave named Tom murdered a neighbor of George Hairston's plantation. Through his confession, Hairston discovered a plot to poison himself and neighboring slaveholders, a rebellion that would have been disguised by an expected British attack in the area.

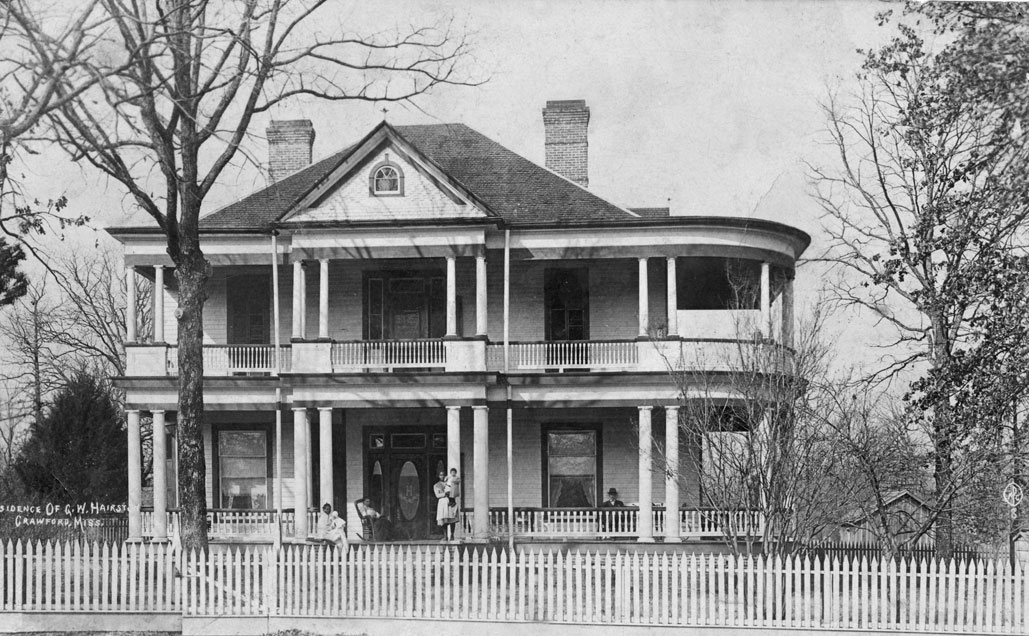
Hairston Plantation, Lowndes County, Mississippi, home of George W. Hairston, c. 1909. Part of the empire of Hairston homes and plantations scattered about the South

The Hairston family, who had Beaver Creek built, eventually came to control tens of thousands of acres of land in Virginia, North Carolina and elsewhere across the South. Initially planters of tobacco, the family eventually became the largest slaveholders in the South: the engine of their extraordinary wealth (they were said to be one of the wealthiest families in America) was the propagation of slaves for export to the Deep South. The family married into other prominent local families, including several intermarriages with the descendants of General Joseph Martin, for whom Martinsville is named. George Hairston, who married his cousin Matilda Martin, daughter of Col. William Martin and Susan (Hairston) Martin, represented the district in Congress.

The Hairston family descends from Peter Hairston, who left Scotland for America, initially locating in Pennsylvania and eventually moving south to Virginia in the 1740s.

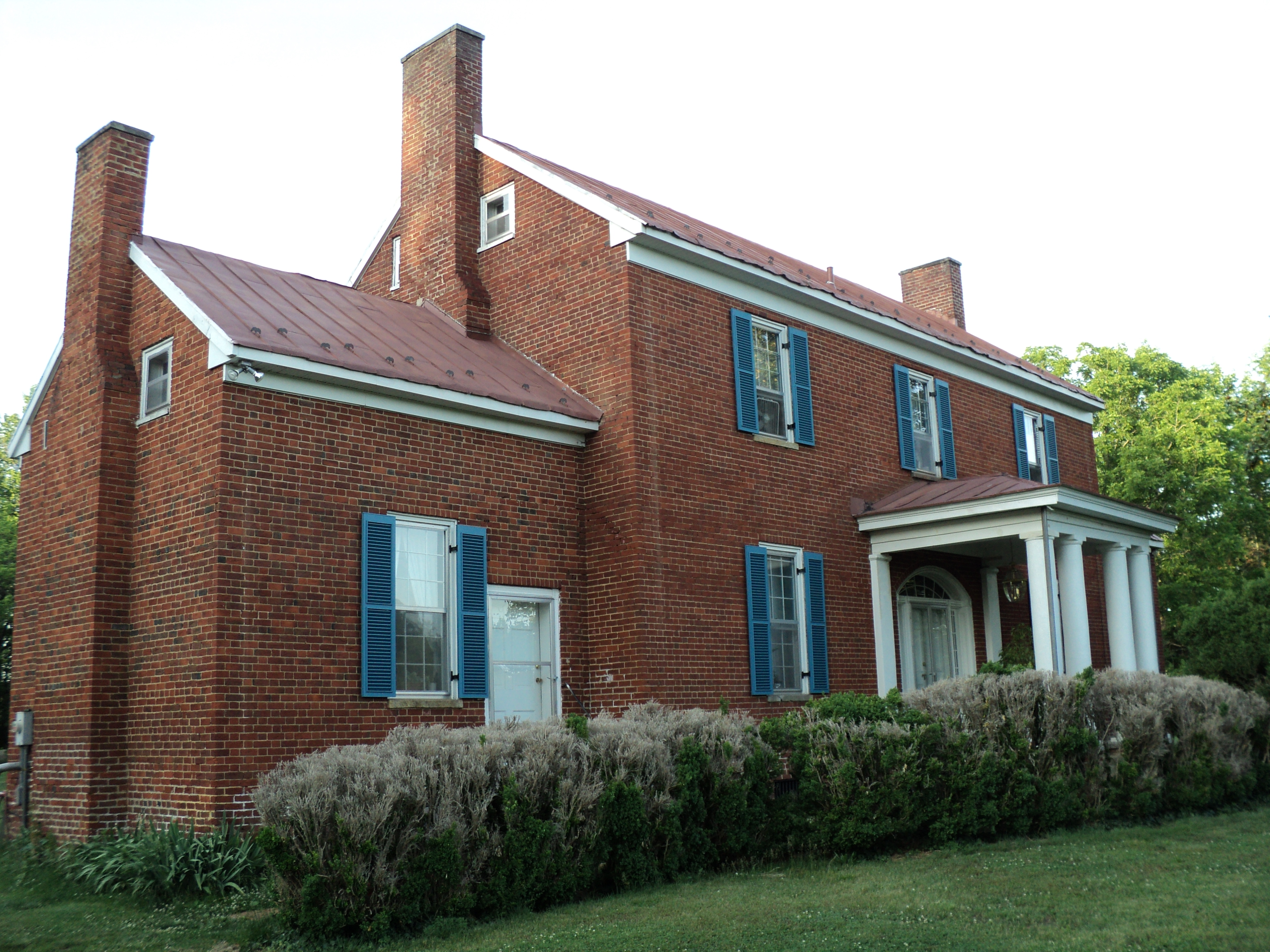
Hordsville, built while owned by 1836 by George Hairston, Henry County, Virginia

Ultimately, the fallout from the Civil War, chiefly the emancipation of slaves, put an end to the Hairston's booming business and the family's fortunes dwindled. At the center of the Plantation is the Hairston's classical revival mansion. Although the plantation was founded in 1776, the present house was not built until 1837, to replace the original home destroyed in a fire. Today, the house is owned by Bank Services of Virginia, and the home and gardens are usually open to the public during the Historic Garden Week in Virginia.

== See also ==
- Cooleemee
