= Virginia's 46th House of Delegates district =

Virginia legislative district

District map from the 2023 election

Virginia's 46th House of Delegates district elects one of 100 seats in the Virginia House of Delegates, the lower house of the state's bicameral legislature. District 46 is composed of part of Alexandria, Virginia. It is represented by Republican Mitchell Cornett.

In the 2015 Virginia House of Delegates election Herring defeated Republican Sean Lenehan and Libertarian Andy Bakker. Herring ran unopposed in 2017.

== Members ==
- Jed Arnold (2024-2026)
- Mitchell Cornett (2026-present)

== Results ==
Results from Virginia's 2015 House of Delegates district election
Party	Candidate	Votes	%	±%
Democratic	Charniele Herring (inc.)	7,507	66.96%	
Republican	Sean Lenehan	3,170	28.27%	
Libertarian	Andy Bakker	505	4.50%	
Write-ins		29	.25%	
Turnout		11,211		
Democratic hold		Swing		
