= Barry Michaels =

American radio personality (born 1952)

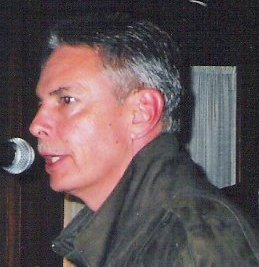
Barry Michaels

Barry Michaels (born 1952) is an American radio personality.

== Personal life ==
Michaels was born in Martinsville, Virginia, U.S., to father Aaron, a combat veteran of World War II, a survivor of D-Day and mother Lottie. Barry graduated from Fieldale-Collinsville High School in Collinsville, Virginia, attended Virginia Western Community College in Roanoke, Virginia, and has received training as a firefighter specializing in hazardous materials.

Barry is married to Sandra and they have four children, including twins: Aaron, Sam, Andy, and Joe.

== Radio career ==
Michaels has spent most of his on-air time in the southeastern United States and except for several instances, always in 'morning drive'. He began his radio career in Rocky Mount, Virginia at WYTI on Sunday mornings playing gospel music and filling in on the afternoon rock and roll show, and was the mid-day host at WROV Roanoke, Virginia. Michaels began his career in morning radio with WBJW/WLOF Orlando, Florida; WMXJ and WKIS Miami, Florida; The ABC Radio Networks while simultaneously being heard on the Armed Forces Radio Network where he was partnered with Anna DeHaro for 'The Barry and Anna Show', and KYNG Dallas, Texas; KMLE, where Michaels teamed with Bill Taylor for 'The Taylor and The Bear Show' Phoenix, Arizona; KIKK Houston, Texas; WQSR Baltimore, Maryland; KSAC Sacramento, California, WFOG/WWSO Virginia Beach, Virginia as Michaels in The Morning, and WYYD Lynchburg, Virginia as Bear in the Morning. Barry was co-hosting the morning show on WNDD ('WIND-FM') Gainesville, Florida until January 11, 2019.

== Awards ==
Barry gained national attention when Billboard magazine and the Country Music Association (CMA) nominated him twice as Major Market Air Personality of The Year, for the years 1990 and 1992. Barry has also been recognized for his commercial voice work by winning three Addy Awards, in 1977, 1978, and 1981. Barry has been nominated on numerous occasions as Music Director of the Year by the Bobby Poe Pop Music Survey. Michaels was the first radio personality selected to broadcast from Disney World, celebrating the tenth anniversary of their location in Orlando, Florida. He was asked by Disney officials to return for the first ever live broadcast in 1982 at the opening of Epcot Center. Barry's humanitarian efforts on behalf of the American Cancer Society, the Muscular Dystrophy Association, the Cystic Fibrosis Foundation and other local and national organizations have helped raise awareness of their efforts to assist those in the community. Until April 22, 2010, Barry did mornings, imaging, and web design for WYYD-FM Roanoke/Lynchburg, Virginia, where he was awarded the prestigious 2006 Clear Channel Horizon Award for exemplary service to the company and the audience, by the management and staff of Clear Channel Radio Roanoke, Virginia. Since that time, Barry has won numerous ADDY awards, both local and regional and at the prestigious DASH Conference held in Detroit, Barry won Best Commercial and Audio Production for his Volkswagen commercials. See the awards presentation here-http://jacobsmedia.com/2015-be-fabulous-award-winners/
