= Robert Hairston =

American politician

Member of the Virginia House of Delegates for Henry County
- In office May 5, 1777 – 1787 Serving with Abram Penn
- Preceded by: position created
- Succeeded by: Peter Saunders

Personal details
- Born: circa 1719 County Antrim, Northern Ireland or Dumfriesshire, Scotland
- Died: August 3, 1791 Franklin County, Virginia
- Spouse: Elizabeth Perkins Letcher
- Relations: Samuel Hairston (brother); Robert Hairston (grandson), George Hairston(grandson); George Hairston Jr.(great-grandson);
- Children: 10 including George Hairston, Samuel Hairston

Robert Hairston (1717—August 3, 1791) was an Scotch-Irish 18th century settler who became a planter, politician, and military officer in Virginia and served in the initial session of the Virginia House of Delegates representing Henry County.

== Family life ==
His father Peter Hairston, who was Presbyterian and probably Scots-Irish, had immigrated with his family from northern Ireland (or possibly Scotland) to Pennsylvania about 1728, probably escaping a drought. With his wife Agnes, he established (and moved their family from) three homes in different Pennsylvania counties in Pennsylvania before taking the Great Wagon Road south to Virginia circa 1739 and establishing a farm in what was then Goochland County (but later became Albemarle County). The family included at least two daughters (one of whom died at sea and the other of whom ultimately moved to Kentucky) and three sons: Andrew (circa 1716-Apr.1782), Samuel (circa 1722-Jun.1782) and this Robert.

== Career ==
=== Planter ===
Robert Hairston established a home in what became Henry county that he called "Marrowbone plantation". The plantation house may have been built around 1775–1776, and was passed down to his son George, and remained in the family for the next five generations, until 1881. Other accounts say that Marrowbone plantation was constructed in 1759, in the part of Pittsylvania County, Virginia, which later became Henry County, and one historian claims the house was built in 1749. Yet another states that when Franklin County was formed, Hairston's Pigg River home was no longer in Henry County, so Hairston became a member of its first court.

On the various farms and holdings the family owned, by the end of the 18th century he also owned nineteen slaves. In 1791, Robert Hairston owned 1,684 acres of land.

=== Military officer ===
During the French and Indian War of 1754–1763, Robert Hairston began his career as a militia officer, first commissioned as an ensign in 1754, then rising to lieutenant in the Bedford County militia in 1758 and accepting a commission as its captain dated May 28, 1759.

During the American Revolution, Hairston also served as county sheriff, as well as captain of the local militia company, with his eldest son George Hairston as his lieutenant. During the American Revolution, he served as a militia captain, Both his eldest sons, Colonel George Hairston and Colonel Samuel Hairston, achieved even higher ranks in the Continental army.

=== Politician ===
With significant landholdings in several counties, and because counties divided and became two or more counties, Robert Hairston served in several locales as a justice of the peace (the justices of the peace jointly administering the county in that era, and sometimes being called "judges" despite limited jurisdiction). He was a Judge in Pittsylvania County, Virginia in 1775, and Henry County in 1778, and Franklin County in 1785. In 1786, Hairston was man with the third highest tax payment in Franklin County, Virginia. A local Justice of the Peace, Harrison took the oath of allegiance to the revolution in 1776, and previously had received his commission from Thomas Nelson, Jr. appointing him the "High sheriff" of Henry County.

Bedford County, Virginia voters elected his brother Samuel Hairston, also an active militia officer, to the Virginia House of Burgesses in 1758. Hairston served in the House of Delegates of the Virginia General Assembly in the May 5, to June 28, 1777, and October 20 to January 24, 1778, Sessions with the other Henry county representative, Abram Penn.

== Death and burial ==
Robert Hairston died in 1791 in Franklin County at farm called "Runnett Bag". His widow Ruth Stovall Hairston survived him by nearly two decades, before her death in 1808. At the time of his death in 1791, Hairston owned 1,684 acres of land and twenty-two slaves. He was one of the richest men in Franklin County, and after all his bequests were distributed, his estate was worth £499.1.6 (499 pounds, one shilling, sixpence). Like most families of this age in the Virginia Piedmont, the estate consisted mostly of land and slaves, although he also had a silver watch. Much of his land had already been given to his children before his death, and each daughter specifically had been given a farm in their own names. "Hairston endowed each of his daughters- as did most fathers who were able to do so- with her own estate to control independently of her present or future husband."

Robert and his wife Ruth are probably interred under the waters of the present day Philpott Dam, which was completed in 1952. Philpott Lake covered 19 cemeteries, and although their headstones were relocated to high ground, their remains were not disinterred.
