= Virginia State Route 413 =

State highway in Danville, Virginia, US

State Route 413
- Memorial Drive

Route information
- Maintained by VDOT
- Length: 1.29 mi (2.08 km)
- Existed: early 1980s–present

Major junctions
- West end: US 29 / SR 86 in Danville
- East end: SR 293 in Danville

Location
- Country: United States
- State: Virginia
- Counties: City of Danville

Highway system
- Virginia Routes; Interstate; US; Primary; Secondary; Byways; History; HOT lanes
← SR 412	→ SR 415

State Route 413 (SR 413) is a primary state highway in the U.S. state of Virginia. Known as Memorial Drive, the state highway runs 1.29 miles (2.08 km) from U.S. Route 29 Business (US 29 Business) and SR 86 east to SR 293 within the independent city of Danville.

== Route description ==
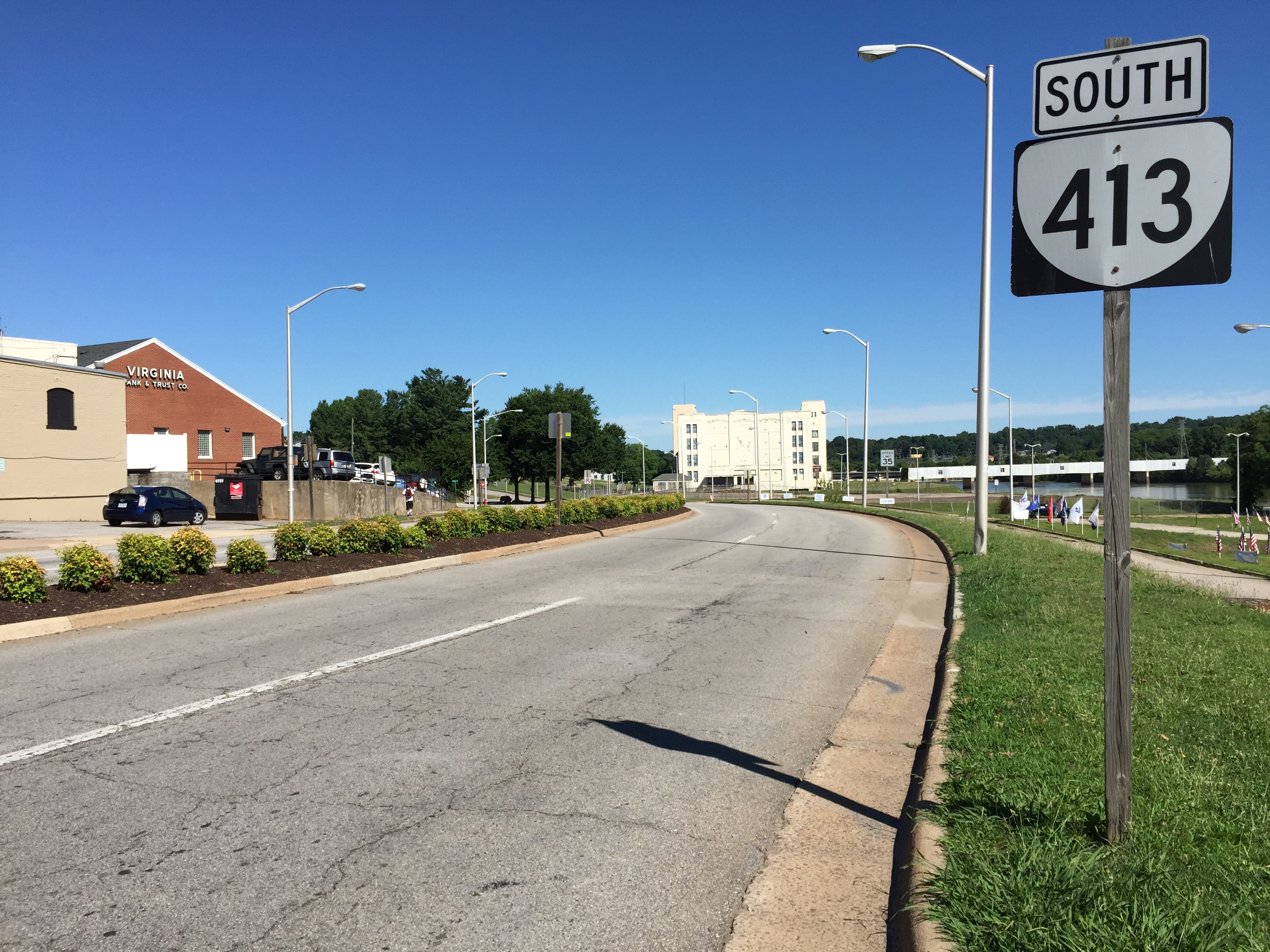
View south along SR 413 at SR 293 in Danville

SR 413 begins at a cloverleaf interchange with US 29 Business and SR 86 west of downtown Danville. US 29 Business heads southwest along a continuation of Memorial Drive and north on Central Boulevard, which crosses over the Dan River and has another cloverleaf interchange with US 58 Business (Riverside Drive). SR 413 heads east as a four-lane divided highway, paralleling the south bank of the Dan River into the Danville Historic District. The state highway reaches SR 293 (Main Street) just south of the pair of bridges on which SR 293 crosses the river. The roadway continues as Craghead Street east toward the Danville station serving Amtrak's Crescent train. At Patton Street which carries the northbound lanes of SR 293, SR 413 ends.

== Major intersections ==
The entire route is in Danville.

mi	km	Destinations	Notes
0.00	0.00	US 29 Bus. (Memorial Drive / Central Boulevard) / SR 86 (Central Boulevard) – Martinsville, Lynchburg, Greensboro	Cloverleaf interchange; southern terminus
1.23	1.98	SR 293 south (Main Street)	
1.29	2.08	SR 293 north (Patton Street) / Craghead Street east	Northern terminus
1.000 mi = 1.609 km; 1.000 km = 0.621 mi
