= Virginia State Route 412 =

State highway in Montgomery County, Virginia, US

State Route 412
- Prices Fork Road

Route information
- Maintained by VDOT
- Length: 1.35 mi (2.17 km)
- Existed: early 1980s–present

Major junctions
- West end: US 460 in Blacksburg
- East end: US 460 Bus. in Blacksburg

Location
- Country: United States
- State: Virginia
- Counties: Montgomery

Highway system
- Virginia Routes; Interstate; US; Primary; Secondary; Byways; History; HOT lanes
| ← SR 407 | → SR 413 |

State Route 412 (SR 412) is a primary state highway in the U.S. state of Virginia. Known as Prices Fork Road, the state highway runs 1.35 miles (2.17 km) from U.S. Route 460 (US 460) east to US 460 Business within Blacksburg in northern Montgomery County. SR 412 connects US 460 with downtown Blacksburg and the northern end of the campus of Virginia Tech.

== Route description ==
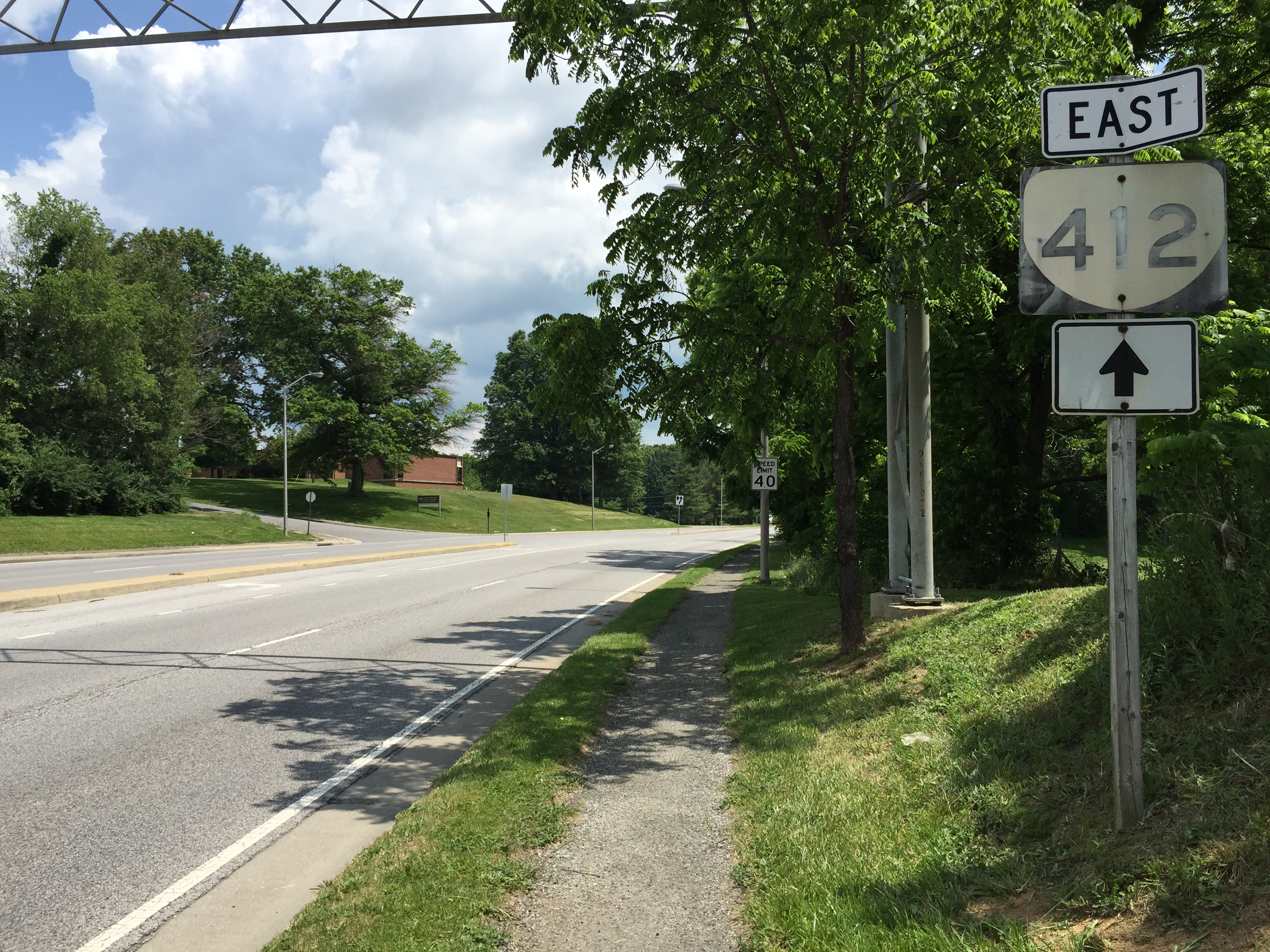
View east along SR 412 at US 460 in Blacksburg

SR 412 begins at a partial cloverleaf interchange with US 460, which bypasses the center of Blacksburg to the west. Prices Fork Road continues west as an unnumbered highway to the western town limit, where the highway continues as SR 685 toward the community of Prices Fork. SR 412 heads east as a four-lane divided highway and passes between the University City shopping center to the north and the Virginia Tech golf course and inn and conference center to the south. The state highway continues between a residential area to the north and several parking lots on the university campus to the south. SR 412 reaches its eastern terminus at a three-legged roundabout with US 460 Business (Main Street) near the Odd Fellows Hall at the north end of downtown Blacksburg.

== Major intersections ==
The entire route is in Blacksburg, Montgomery County.

| mi | km | Destinations | Notes |
|---|---|---|---|
| 0.00 | 0.00 | Prices Fork Road west – Prices Fork | Partial cloverleaf interchange; western terminus |
| 0.00 | 0.00 | US 460 – Roanoke, Bluefield | Partial cloverleaf interchange; western terminus |
| 1.35 | 2.17 | US 460 Bus. (Main Street) | Roundabout; eastern terminus |
1.000 mi = 1.609 km; 1.000 km = 0.621 mi
