= Virginia State Route 86 =

Highway in Virginia connecting two states

State Route 86

Route information
- Maintained by City of Danville
- Length: 3.33 mi (5.36 km)
- Existed: 1933–present

Major junctions
- South end: NC 86 in Danville
- Future I-785 / US 29 / US 58 in Danville
- North end: US 29 Bus. / SR 413 in Danville

Location
- Country: United States
- State: Virginia
- Counties: City of Danville

Highway system
- Virginia Routes; Interstate; US; Primary; Secondary; Byways; History; HOT lanes
← I-85	→ SR 87

State Route 86 (SR 86) is a state highway in the U.S. state of Virginia. The state highway runs 3.33 miles (5.36 km) from the North Carolina state line, where the highway continues south as North Carolina Highway 86 (NC 86) to U.S. Route 29 Business (US 29 Bus.) and SR 413. The entire route is contained within the independent city of Danville.

== Route description ==
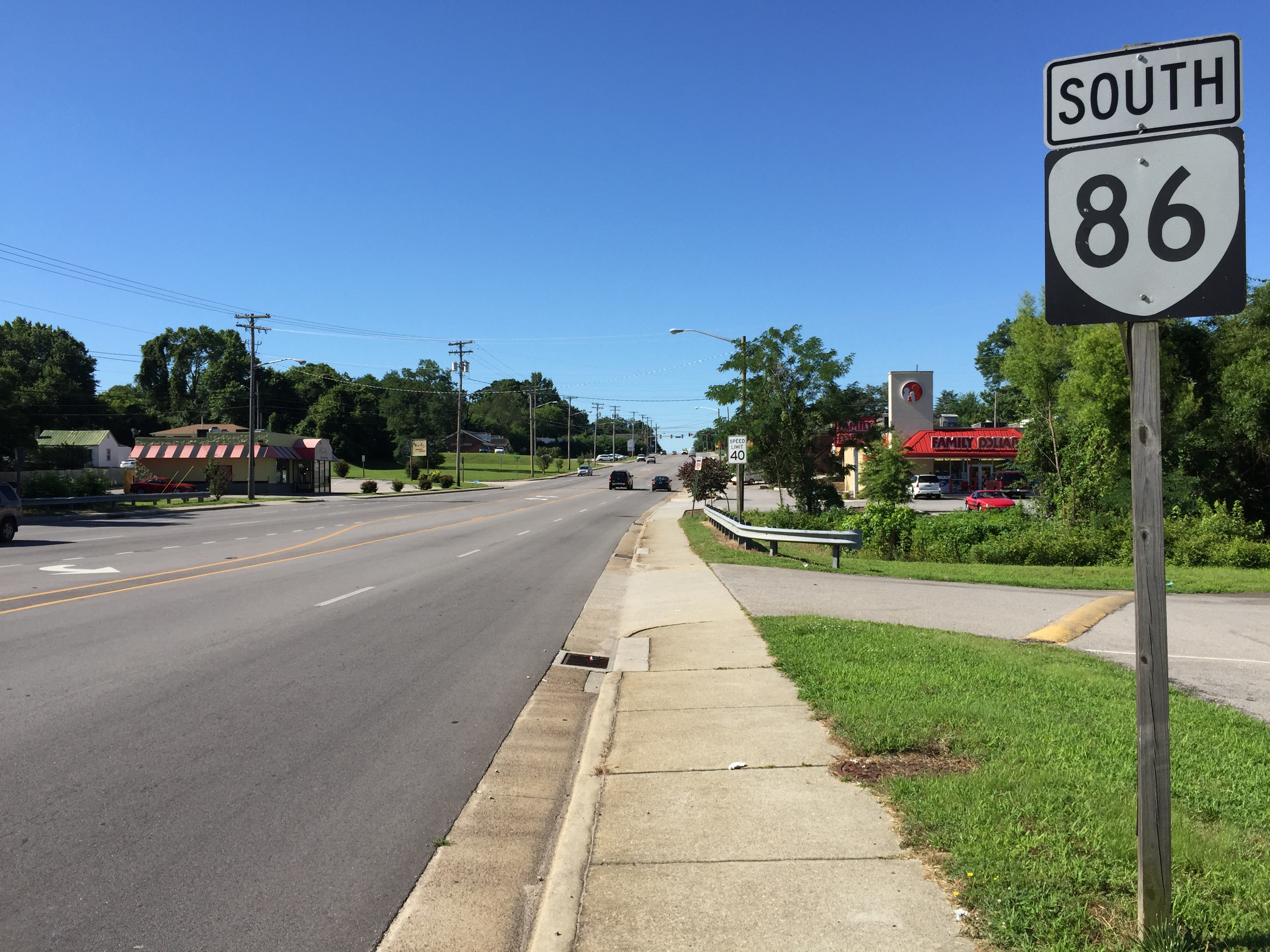
View south along SR 86 in Danville

SR 86 begins at the North Carolina state line, which also serves as the southern limit of the independent city of Danville. The road continues south as NC 86 toward Yanceyville and Chapel Hill. SR 86 heads north as South Main Street, which expands from two lanes to a four-lane divided highway just north of the border and has a diamond interchange with the Danville Expressway, which carries US 29 and US 58 around the south side of the city. North of College Park Drive, the state highway becomes a five-lane road with a center left-turn lane and passes Danville Community College. At its crossing of Norfolk Southern Railway's Danville District, SR 86 expands to a divided highway and its name changes to Central Boulevard. The state highway has a partial cloverleaf interchange with SR 293 (West Main Street) next to Danville Regional Medical Center before reaching a cloverleaf interchange with US 29 Business and SR 413 just south of the Dan River. Memorial Drive heads west as US 29 Bus. toward Greensboro and east as SR 413 toward downtown Danville. US 29 Bus. continues north as Central Boulevard across the Dan River.

Though official documents show SR 86 ending at the Memorial Drive interchange, signage exists along a 1.3-mile-long (2.1 km) segment of Central Boulevard and intersecting roads showing Central Boulevard as a part of SR 86. On Memorial Drive, the road to the north is signed as SR 86, signs at the Riverside Drive (US 58 Bus.) and Piedmont Drive interchanges show the road to the south as SR 86, and an "End North SR 86" sign is posted at Central Boulevard's end at Piney Forest Road.

== Major intersections ==
The entire route is in Danville.

mi	km	Destinations	Notes
0.00	0.00	NC 86 south – Chapel Hill	North Carolina state line; southern terminus
0.25	0.40	US 29 / US 58 (Danville Expressway) – Martinsville, Greensboro, Lynchburg, South Boston, Airport	interchange
2.73	4.39	SR 293 (West Main Street)	interchange
3.33	5.36	US 29 Bus. south / SR 413 north (Memorial Drive) to US 29 south – Greensboro, Downtown Danville	interchange; south end of US 29 Bus. overlap
		US 58 Bus. – Martinsville, South Boston, Airport	interchange
		Piedmont Drive west	interchange
		US 29 Bus. north (Piney Forest Road) to US 29 north – Lynchburg	Northern terminus; north end of US 29 Bus. overlap
1.000 mi = 1.609 km; 1.000 km = 0.621 mi

< SR 143	Spurs of SR 14; 1923–1928	none
< SR 300	District 3 State Routes; 1928–1933	SR 302 >
