= VA86 =

VA-86 has the following meanings:

- Attack Squadron 86 (U.S. Navy)
- State Route 86 (Virginia)
