= Virginia State Route 293 =

Primary state highway in Danville, Virginia, US

State Route 293

Route information
- Maintained by VDOT
- Length: 7.05 mi (11.35 km)
- Existed: 1996–present

Major junctions
- South end: US 29 Bus. in Danville
- US 360 / US 58 Bus. in Danville
- North end: US 29 Bus. in Danville

Location
- Country: United States
- State: Virginia
- Counties: City of Danville

Highway system
- Virginia Routes; Interstate; US; Primary; Secondary; Byways; History; HOT lanes
| ← SR 292 | → SR 294 |

State Route 293 (SR 293) is a primary state highway in the U.S. state of Virginia. The state highway runs 7.05 miles (11.35 km) between intersections with U.S. Route 29 Business (US 29 Business) on the south and north sides of the independent city of Danville. SR 293 is the original alignment of US 29 through Danville, which has been twice bypassed: first by what is now US 29 Business and later by the current US 29 freeway.

== Route description ==
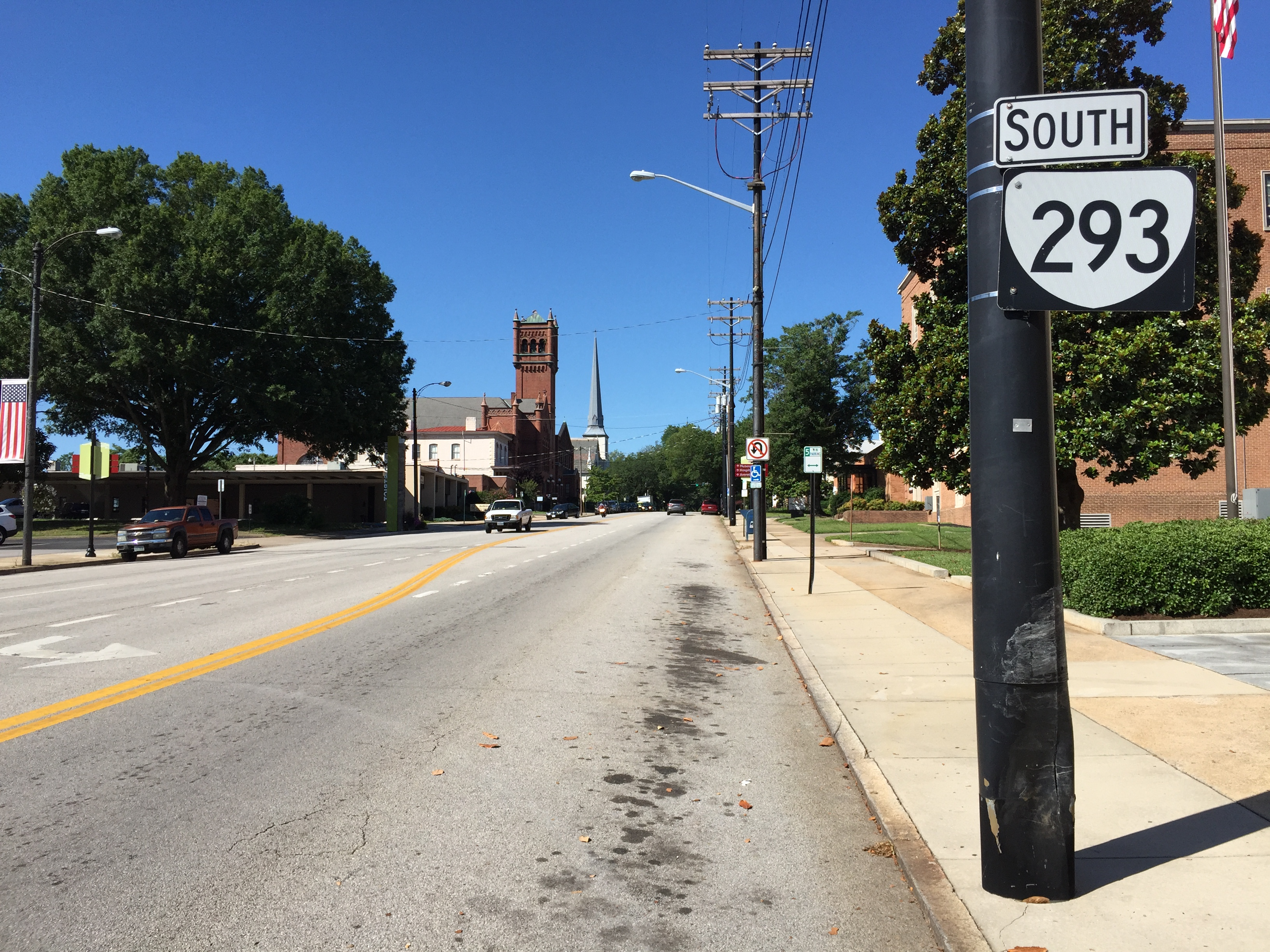
View south along SR 293 in Danville

SR 293 begins at a directional intersection with US 29 Business southwest of downtown Danville. There is no access to northbound SR 293 from southbound US 29 Business, which is named Memorial Drive north of the intersection, and is a continuation of West Main Street south toward US 29 and Greensboro. SR 293 heads east as West Main Street, a two-lane undivided road that parallels Norfolk Southern Railway's Danville District. The state highway veers northeast away from the railroad and passes Averett University prior to its partial cloverleaf interchange with SR 86 (Central Boulevard) adjacent to Danville Regional Medical Center. East of SR 86, SR 293 meets the northern end of South Main Street and becomes Main Street, which heads through the Danville Historic District. At the north end of downtown Danville, SR 293 intersects the eastern end of SR 413 (Memorial Drive).

Main Street splits to cross the Dan River on a pair of bridges collectively named the Main Street Bridge. Northbound SR 293 uses the three-lane bridge completed in 2005 and southbound SR 293 follows the two-lane bridge from the 1920s. Immediately to the north of the river, SR 293 intersects US 58 Business, which heads west as Riverside Drive and east as River Street. The intersection also serves as the western terminus of both US 360 and SR 360; the U.S. Highway heads east concurrent with US 58 Business toward US 58 and South Boston and the state-numbered highway runs concurrently with SR 293 on North Main Street. The two state highways diverge at a Y intersection, with SR 360 heading east toward Halifax as Richmond Boulevard. SR 293 expands to a five-lane road with center turn lane just south of its intersection with SR 41 (Franklin Turnpike), then reaches its northern terminus at US 29 Business. The business route heads south as Piney Forest Road and north as a continuation of North Main Street toward Lynchburg.

== Major intersections ==
The entire route is in Danville.

| mi | km | Destinations | Notes |
|---|---|---|---|
| 0.00 | 0.00 | US 29 Bus. (West Main Street / Memorial Drive) to US 58 Bus. | Southern terminus; no access from US 29 Bus. south to SR 293 north |
| | | Park Avenue | former SR 125 north |
| 2.36 | 3.80 | SR 86 to US 29 Bus. | interchange |
| 3.43 | 5.52 | SR 413 south (Memorial Drive / Craghead Street) | Northern terminus of SR 413 |
| 3.65 | 5.87 | US 58 Bus. / US 360 east (Riverside Drive / River Street) – South Boston, Richmond, Airport | south end of SR 360 overlap |
| 4.35 | 7.00 | SR 360 east (Richmond Boulevard) | north end of SR 360 overlap |
| 6.14 | 9.88 | SR 41 (Franklin Turnpike) | |
| 7.05 | 11.35 | US 29 Bus. (Piney Forest Road / North Main Street) – Lynchburg | |
1.000 mi = 1.609 km; 1.000 km = 0.621 mi: Concurrency terminus; Incomplete access
