= Susan K. Gilmour =

American cancer biologist

- Born: 1953 (age 72–73)
- Education: Rutgers University/University of Medicine and Dentistry of New Jersey (PhD); University of Virginia (BA)
- Scientific career
- Fields: Cancer research, polyamines, stem cells, polyamine-targeted therapy
- Workplaces: Lankenau Institute for Medical Research; The Wistar Institute

Susan K. Gilmour (born 1953) is an American cancer biologist and professor at Lankenau Institute for Medical Research.

Gilmour earned a BA with distinction in biology from the University of Virginia in 1975 then attended Memorial Hospital School of Medical Technology (now Danville Regional Medical Center) in Danville, Virginia; became board certified in medical technology by the American Society for Clinical Pathology; and worked from 1976 to 1979 as a senior medical technologist at the Hospital of the University of Pennsylvania. From 1979 to 1981, Gilmour was a pre-doctoral graduate student in the pharmacology department at Thomas Jefferson University. In 1981, she entered the newly formed joint program in toxicology at Rutgers University/University of Medicine and Dentistry of New Jersey, earning Rutgers’ first PhD in toxicology in 1984. As a pre-doctoral Eli Lilly fellow, she studied the role of metabolism in the toxicology and carcinogenicity of benzene.

Gilmour continued her research at The Wistar Institute in Philadelphia, Pennsylvania, first as postdoctoral fellow (1984 to 1987) and then as research associate (1988 to 1990). Gilmour joined the scientific research staff at LIMR in 1990 and was appointed professor in 2001. She also has a faculty position in the department of cancer biology at Sidney Kimmel Medical College of Thomas Jefferson University.

== See also ==
- Lankenau Institute for Medical Research
- Polyamine
- Ornithine decarboxylase
