= Calvander, North Carolina =

- Unincorporated community
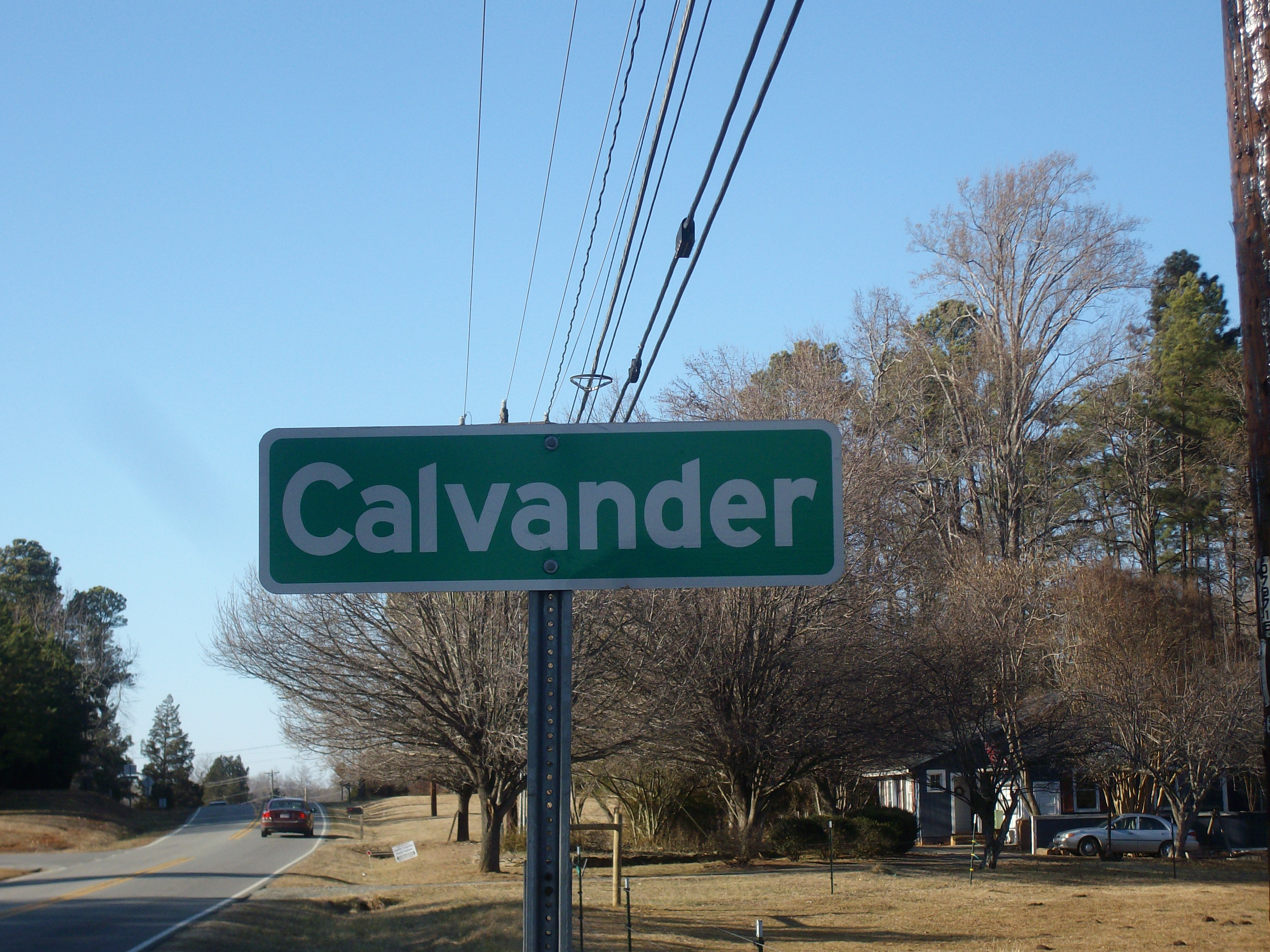
- Entering from the south via Old NC 86

- Location of Calvander in North Carolina Calvander, North Carolina (the United States)
- Coordinates: 35°56′35″N 79°06′35″W
- Country: United States
- State: North Carolina
- County: Orange
- Elevation: 548 ft (167 m)
- Time zone: UTC-5 (Eastern (EST))
  - Summer (DST): UTC-4 (EDT)
- ZIP code: 27516
- Area code: 919
- GNIS feature ID: 982437

Calvander is a rural unincorporated community in southeastern Orange County, North Carolina, United States, located north-northwest of Carrboro. It lies at the intersection of Old Highway 86 and Homestead/Dairyland Road.

Calvander was named as a contraction of the name of Calvin Andrews, who founded the Andrews Academy, a 19th-century schoolhouse lying near the site of the current intersection. A map dated to 1891 identifies the community as including a saw mill, post office, and store. The crossroads currently houses a 76 gas station.
