= North Carolina Highway 86 =

State highway in Orange and Caswell counties in North Carolina, United States

North Carolina Highway 86

Route information
- Maintained by NCDOT
- Length: 53.1 mi (85.5 km)
- Existed: 1940–present

Major junctions
- South end: US 15 / US 501 / NC 54 in Chapel Hill
- I-40 in Chapel Hill; I-85 in Hillsborough; US 70 in Hillsborough; US 158 in Yanceyville
- North end: SR 86 at the Virginia state line near Danville, VA

Location
- Country: United States
- State: North Carolina
- Counties: Orange, Caswell

Highway system
- North Carolina Highway System; Interstate; US; State; Scenic
← I-85	→ I-87

North Carolina Highway 86 (NC 86) is a primary state highway in the U.S. state of North Carolina that runs north and south through Orange and Caswell Counties from Chapel Hill to the Virginia state line at Danville, Virginia. The highway primarily links the towns of Chapel Hill, Hillsborough, and Yanceyville, along with providing a route between Chapel Hill and Virginia. Between Chapel Hill and Hillsborough, NC 86 parallels and serves as an alternative to I-40.

== Route description ==
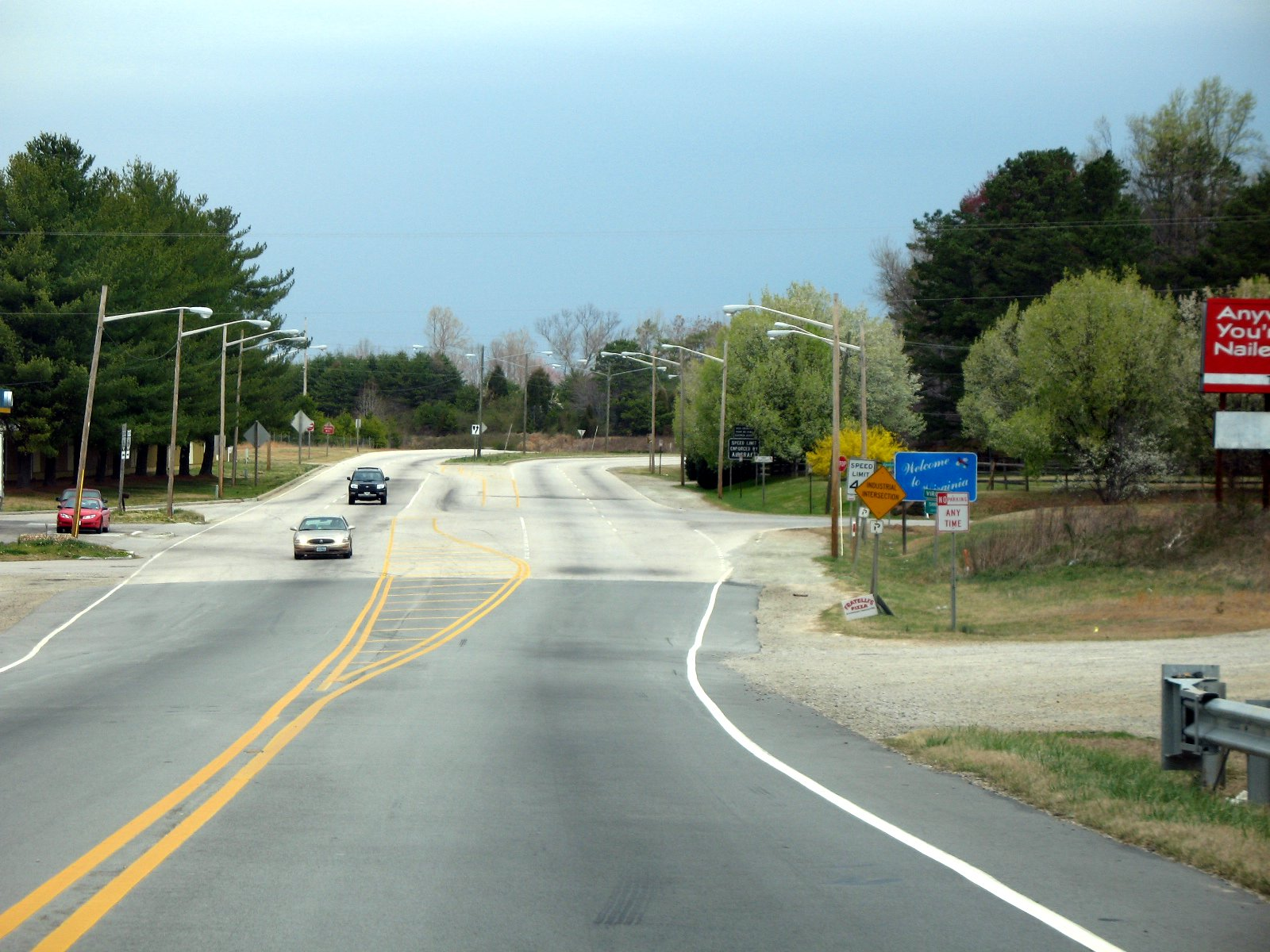
NC 86's northern terminus at the Virginia state line.

From NC 86's southern terminus at US 15/US 501/NC 54 Bypass (Fordham Boulevard) in Chapel Hill, the highway passes through the town's center and the campus of the University of North Carolina at Chapel Hill. Exiting Chapel Hill, the highway intersects I-40 before crossing into rural Orange County. As NC 86 reaches Hillsborough, it meets I-85 and then passes through Hillsborough's downtown. Further north, 86 meets the southern terminus of NC 57. NC 86 briefly joins NC 49 as they cross the Caswell County line.

Entering the small community of Prospect Hill, NC 86 splits from NC 49 and travels north toward Yanceyville. Just outside Yanceyville, NC 86 joins US 158 and crosses NC 62. After passing through central Yanceyville, US 158 splits west while NC 86 continues north to the state line, where the route continues as State Route 86 and travels into Danville, Virginia.

== History ==
Prior to 1940, this was numbered as NC 14. It was renumbered to match up with Virginia's Route 86. Simultaneous with that change, the old NC 65 was renumbered as NC 14.

Old North Carolina Highway 86, (sometimes referred to as Old 86), is a highway that parallels NC 86. Heading from NC 54 near Carrboro, it follows northwest to Homestead/Dairyland Road near the unincorporated community of Calvander, it heads north paralleling I-40 until the intersection at exit 261. Then intersecting I-85, at exit 164, it ends at the intersection with US 70 Business, and NC 86. The highway was moved to the more heavily traveled corridor between Chapel Hill and Hillsborough in the 1950s.

== Major intersections ==
County	Location	mi	km	Destinations	Notes
Orange	Chapel Hill	0.0	0.0	US 15 / US 501 / NC 54 (Fordham Boulevard) – Carrboro, Pittsboro	Interchange
Orange		5.5– 5.7	8.9– 9.2	I-40 – Raleigh, Greensboro	Exit 266 (I-40)
Orange	Hillsborough	12.1– 12.3	19.5– 19.8	I-85 – Durham, Greensboro	Exit 165 (I-85); southern terminus of NC 86 Truck
Orange	Hillsborough	12.8	20.6	US 70 Bus. east / Elizabeth Brady Road	Southern end of US 70 Bus. concurrency
Orange	Hillsborough	14.5	23.3	US 70 Bus. west (Corbin Street)	Northern end of US 70 Bus. concurrency
Orange	Hillsborough	14.8	23.8	US 70 / NC 86 Truck south (Cornelius Street) – Durham, Burlington	Northern terminus of NC 86 Truck
Orange		15.2	24.5	NC 57 north – Roxboro	Southern terminus of NC 57
Orange		27.0	43.5	NC 49 south – Graham	Southern end of NC 49 concurrency
Caswell	Prospect Hill	27.5	44.3	NC 49 north – Roxboro	Northern end of NC 49 concurrency
Caswell	Hightowers	34.3	55.2	NC 119 – Mebane, Semora	
Caswell		38.9	62.6	US 158 east – Roxboro	Southern end of US 158 concurrency
Caswell	Yanceyville	41.9	67.4	NC 62 north – Milton	Southern end of NC 62 concurrency
Caswell	Yanceyville	42.1	67.8	NC 62 south (Main Street)	Northern end of NC 62 concurrency
Caswell	Yanceyville	44.2	71.1	US 158 west / County Home Road – Reidsville	
Caswell		53.1	85.5	SR 86 north – Danville	Virginia state line
1.000 mi = 1.609 km; 1.000 km = 0.621 mi: Concurrency terminus

== Special routes ==
=== Hillsborough truck route ===
North Carolina Highway 86 Truck
- Location: Hillsborough, North Carolina
- Length: 8.3 mi (13.4 km)

North Carolina Highway 86 Truck (NC 86 Truck) is a bypass route for truck drivers that are traveling through the city of Hillsborough. This 8.3-mile (13.4 km) route goes west around the entire city, via I-85 (between exits 165 and 160), I-85 Connector and US 70. The routing is well marked throughout and there are warning signs for truck drivers, including "tolerance ends," for that continue through the city.
