= Camptown, Virginia =

- Census-designated place
- Location within Virginia Location within the United States
- Coordinates: 36°40′58″N 76°54′41″W
- Country: United States
- State: Virginia
- County: Isle of Wight

Area
  - Total: 6.3 sq mi (16.4 km^{2})
  - Land: 6.1 sq mi (15.7 km^{2})
  - Water: 0.27 sq mi (0.7 km^{2})
- Elevation: 29 ft (8.8 m)

Population (2010)
  - Total: 766
  - Density: 126/sq mi (48.7/km^{2})
- Time zone: UTC−5 (Eastern (EST))
  - Summer (DST): UTC−4 (EDT)
- ZIP code: 23851
- FIPS code: 51-12590
- GNIS feature ID: 2584821

Camptown is a census-designated place in Isle of Wight County, Virginia, United States, lying just east of Franklin. As of the 2020 census, Camptown had a population of 718. The International Paper mill (formerly Union Camp, now closed) is here along with a Black community known as Camptown.

== Geography ==
Camptown is bordered to the west by the Blackwater River, which forms the border between Isle of Wight County and the independent city of Franklin. The southeast corner of the CDP borders the city of Suffolk.

U.S. Route 58 Business and U.S. Route 258 Business run through Camptown together as Carrsville Highway. U.S. Route 258 Bypass runs through the eastern side of Camptown as Camp Family Highway. Windsor is 14 miles (23 km) to the northeast via US-258, and Carrsville is 5 miles (8 km) to the east via US-58 Business. The center of Suffolk is 20 miles (32 km) to the east.

According to the U.S. Census Bureau, the Camptown CDP has a total area of 6.3 square miles (16.4 km^{2}), of which 6.1 square miles (15.7 km^{2}) are land and 0.3 square miles (0.7 km^{2}), or 4.00%, are water.

== Demographics ==
Historical population
Census	Pop.	Note	%±
2010	766		—
2020	718		−6.3%
U.S. Decennial Census; 2010 2020

Camptown was first listed as a census designated place in the 2010 U.S. census.

=== Racial and ethnic composition ===
Camptown CDP, Virginia – Racial and ethnic composition Note: the US Census treats Hispanic/Latino as an ethnic category. This table excludes Latinos from the racial categories and assigns them to a separate category. Hispanics/Latinos may be of any race.
Race / Ethnicity (NH = Non-Hispanic)	Pop 2010	Pop 2020	% 2010	% 2020
White alone (NH)	299	272	39.03%	37.88%
Black or African American alone (NH)	437	421	57.05%	58.64%
Native American or Alaska Native alone (NH)	1	0	0.13%	0.00%
Asian alone (NH)	0	6	0.00%	0.84%
Native Hawaiian or Pacific Islander alone (NH)	0	0	0.00%	0.00%
Other race alone (NH)	0	0	0.00%	0.00%
Mixed race or Multiracial (NH)	9	15	1.17%	2.09%
Hispanic or Latino (any race)	20	4	2.61%	0.56%
Total	766	718	100.00%	100.00%
