= Special routes of U.S. Route 58 =

Special routes of U.S. Route 58

Highway system
- United States Numbered Highway System; List; Special; Divided

Eighteen special routes of U.S. Route 58 currently exist in Virginia. In order from west to east they are as follows:

== Ewing–Rose Hill business loop ==
U.S. Route 58 Business
- Location: Ewing–Rose Hill
- Length: 7.00 mi (11.27 km)

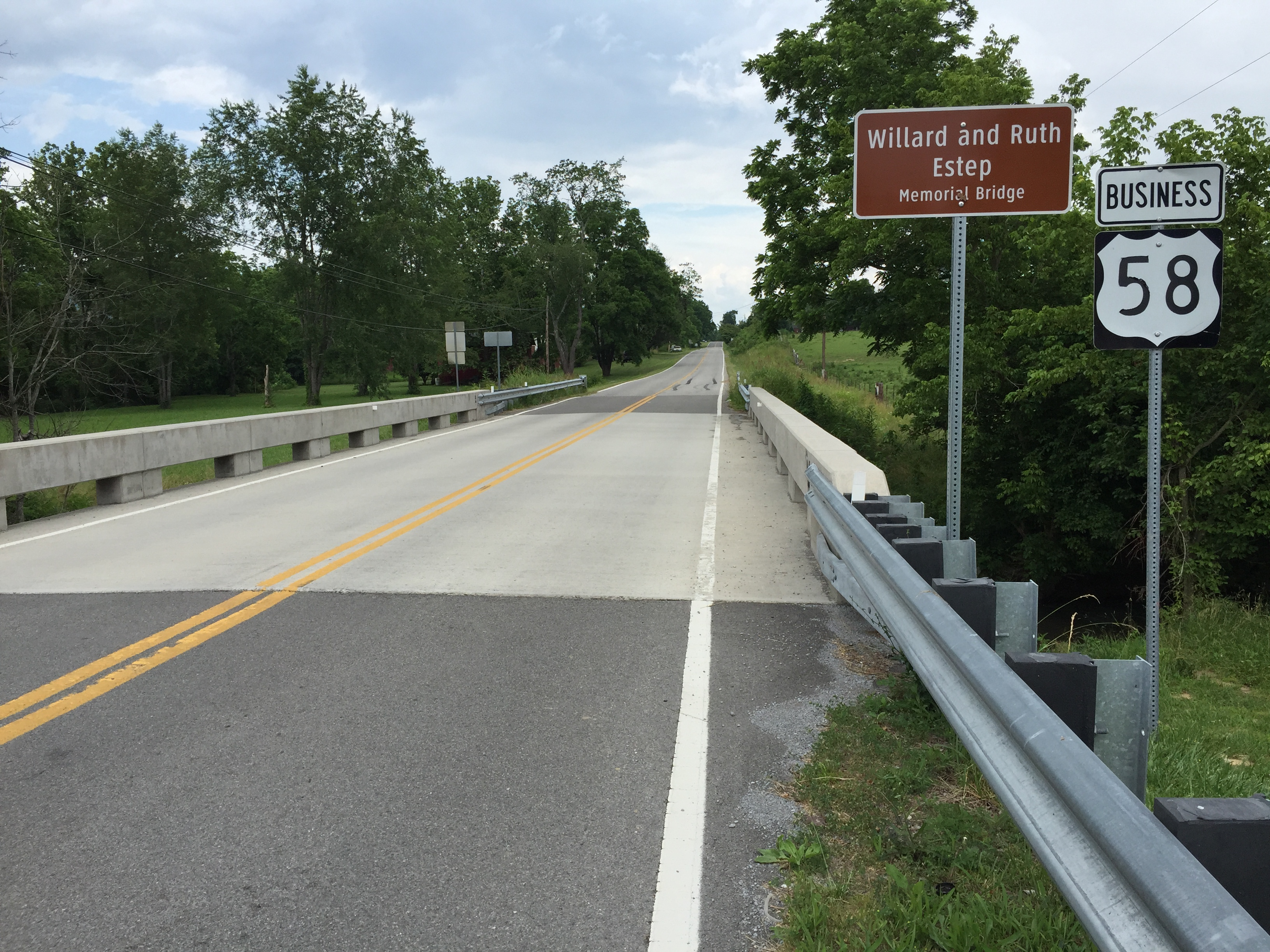
View east along US 58 Bus. at US 58 just west of Ewing

U.S. Route 58 Business (US 58 Bus.) is a seven-mile-long (11 km) business loop of US 58 serving the communities of Ewing and Rose Hill in Lee County. The business route begins southwest of Ewing at an intersection with the divided US 58 and travels northeast along Dr. Thomas Walker Road through Ewing. Upon exiting Ewing, the route passes Thomas Walker High School and enters Rose Hill. In the easternmost section of Rose Hill, US 58 Bus. ends at US 58. The business route never strays more than 0.3 miles (0.48 km) from its parallel parent route.

== Gate City business loop ==
U.S. Route 58 Business
- Location: Gate City
- Length: 2.65 mi (4.26 km)

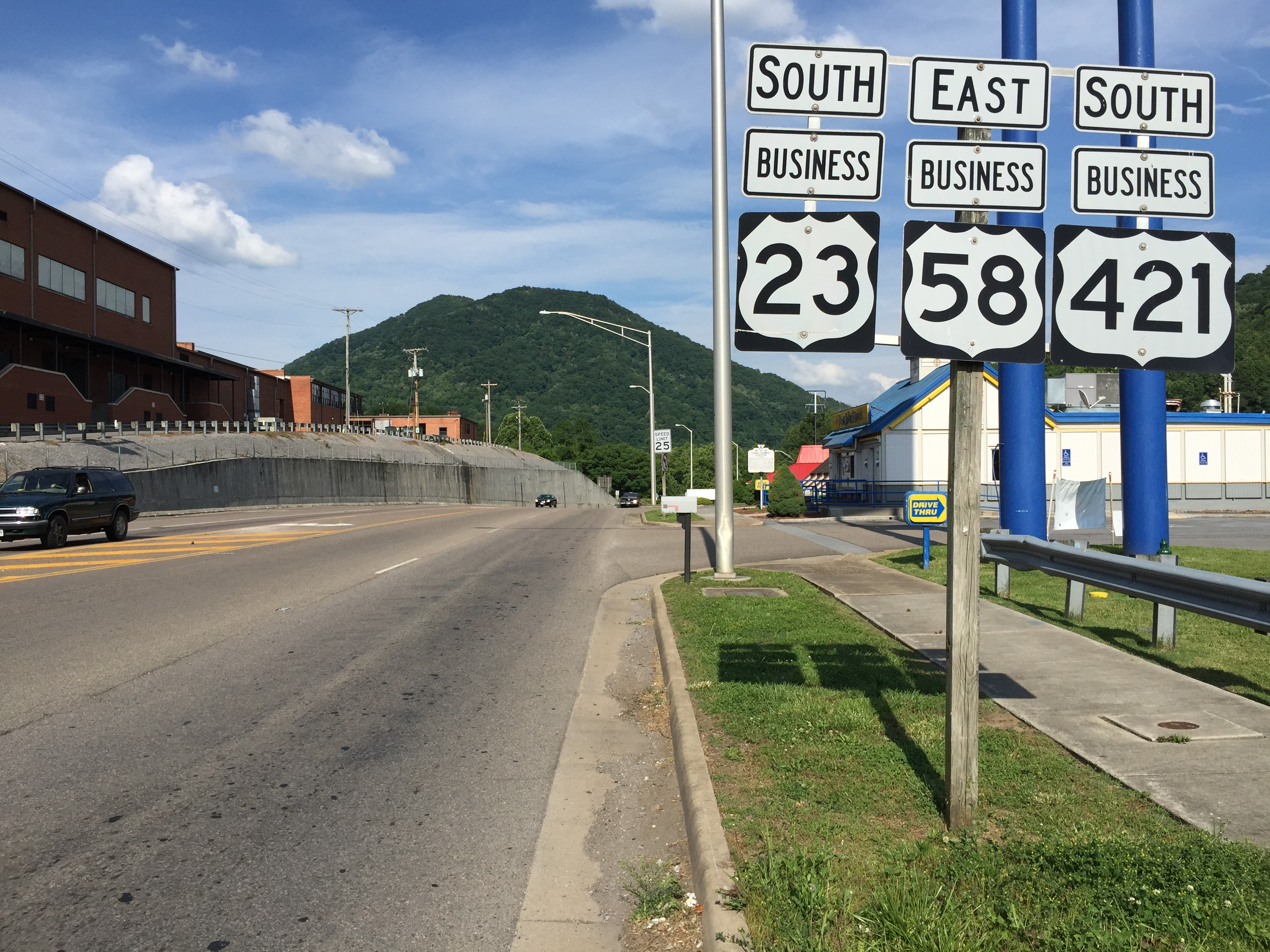
US 23 Bus./US 58 Bus./US 421 Bus. in Gate City

U.S. Route 58 Business (US 58 Bus.) is a business route of US 58 serving Gate City, Scott County. The route is fully concurrent with US 23 Bus. and US 421 Bus. as US 58 concurrent with US 23 and US 421 in the area as well. The routes begin at an interchange just west of the town limits of Gate City with US 23, US 58, US 421 and Daniel Boone Road. Upon entering Gate City, the road name becomes West Jackson Street. In the center of town, East Jackson Street continues as SR 71 while the business routes head east on Kane Street. The routes end at a signalized intersection with the three parent U.S. Routes east of the town center.

== Hillsville business loop ==
U.S. Route 58 Business
- Location: Hillsville
- Length: 3.9 mi (6.3 km)

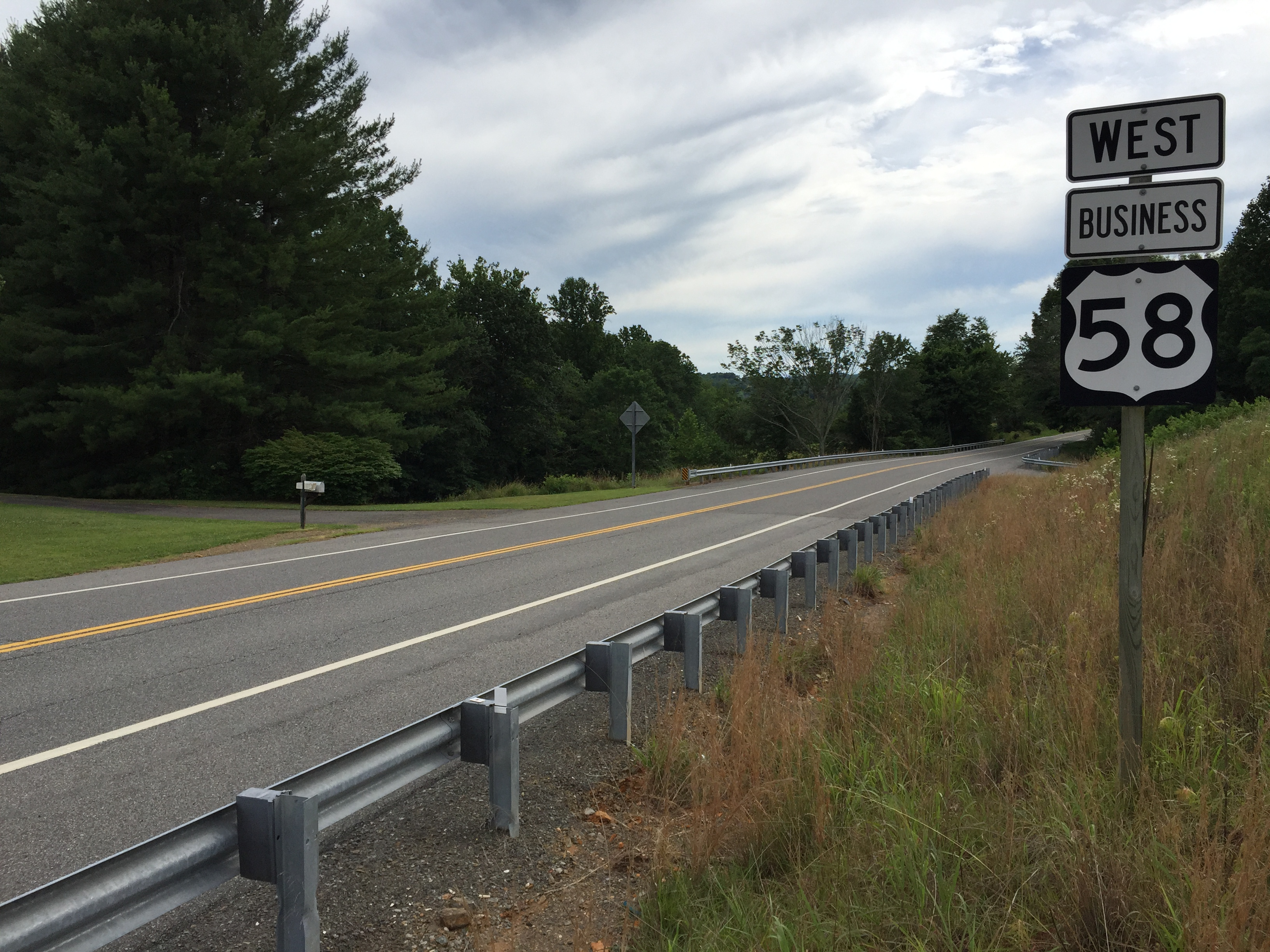
View west at the east end of US 58 Bus. at US 58 in Hillsville

U.S. Route 58 Business (US 58 Bus.) is a business route of US 58 serving Hillsville in Carroll County. It was created as a result of the 2008–2011 construction of the Hillsville Bypass, which became the realigned section of main line US 58. The west half of the route is concurrent with US 221.

The business route begins west of downtown Hillsville at an interchange where US 58 breaks off of Carrollton Pike to bypass the town to the south. US 58 Bus. initially heads northeast as a divided highway carrying the name Stuart Drive before narrowing to one lane in each direction with a center turn lane. It heads past numerous businesses before reaching Main Street (US 52) in the center of town. The road makes a slight curve towards due east where US 221 splits from the concurrency at Floyd Pike. US 58 Bus. continues down Stuart Drive past Carroll County High School before entering a more rural area within the town limits. Upon exiting the town, the road name changes to Danville Pike before US 58 Bus. ends at a diamond interchange with US 58.

== Meadows of Dan business loop ==
U.S. Route 58 Business
- Location: Meadows of Dan
- Length: 1.92 mi (3.09 km)
- Tourist routes: Virginia Byway

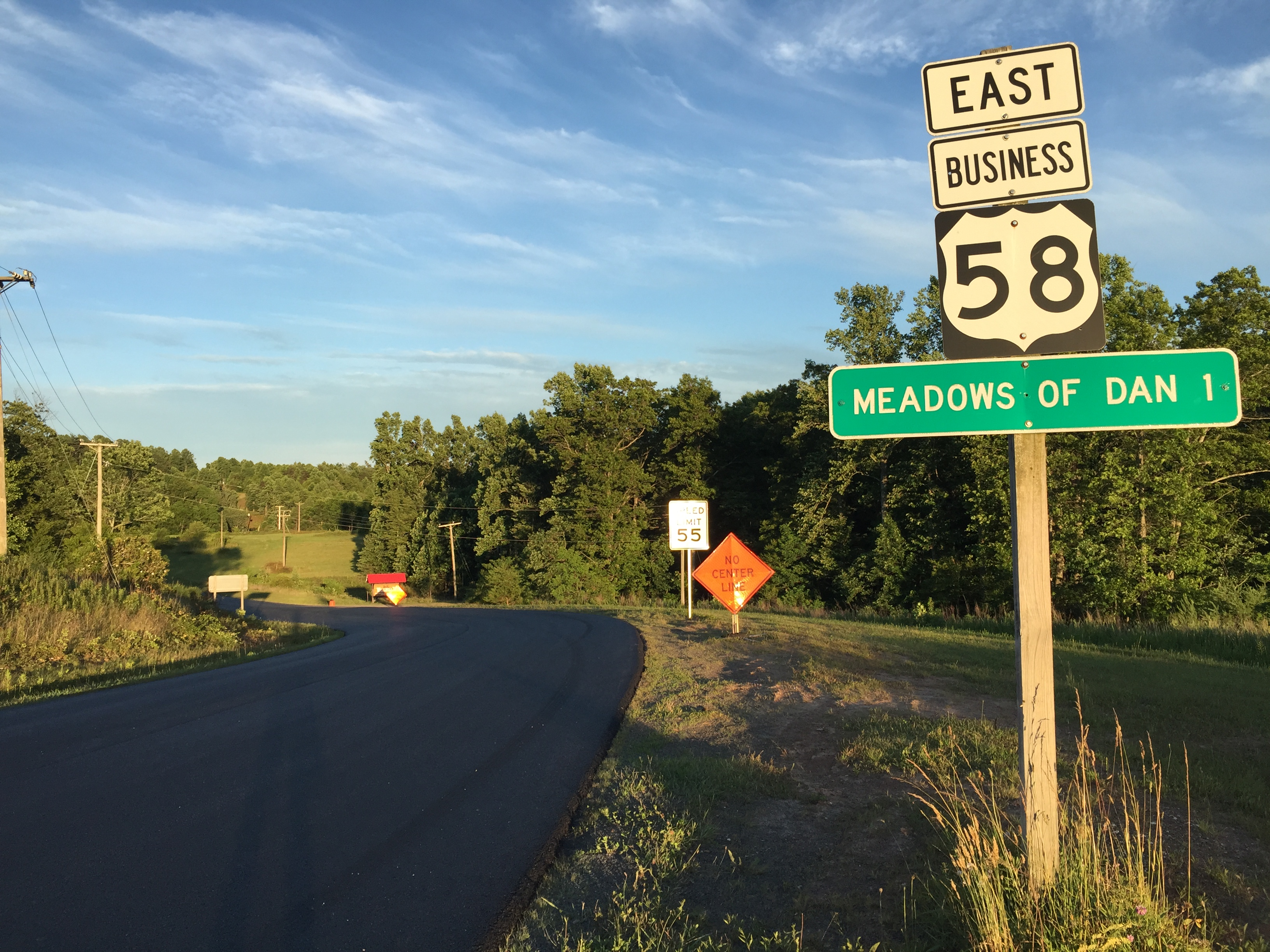
View east at the west end of US 58 Bus. at US 58 in Meadows of Dan

U.S. Route 58 Business (US 58 Bus.) is a business route of US 58 serving the western Patrick County unincorporated community of Meadows of Dan. While the mainline US 58 bypasses the town on a four-lane divided highway, US 58 Bus. is a two-lane rural road. The route begins at an intersection west of the town. At first, the business route passes through a largely rural area only passing by small motels and campgrounds. After an interchange with the Blue Ridge Parkway, US 58 Bus. passes through an area of the town with more businesses as well as churches and a cemetery. The route ends at the eastern end of the town at US 58; east of this point, US 58 transitions to a two lane road.

== Stuart business loop ==
U.S. Route 58 Business
- Location: Stuart
- Length: 2.04 mi (3.28 km)

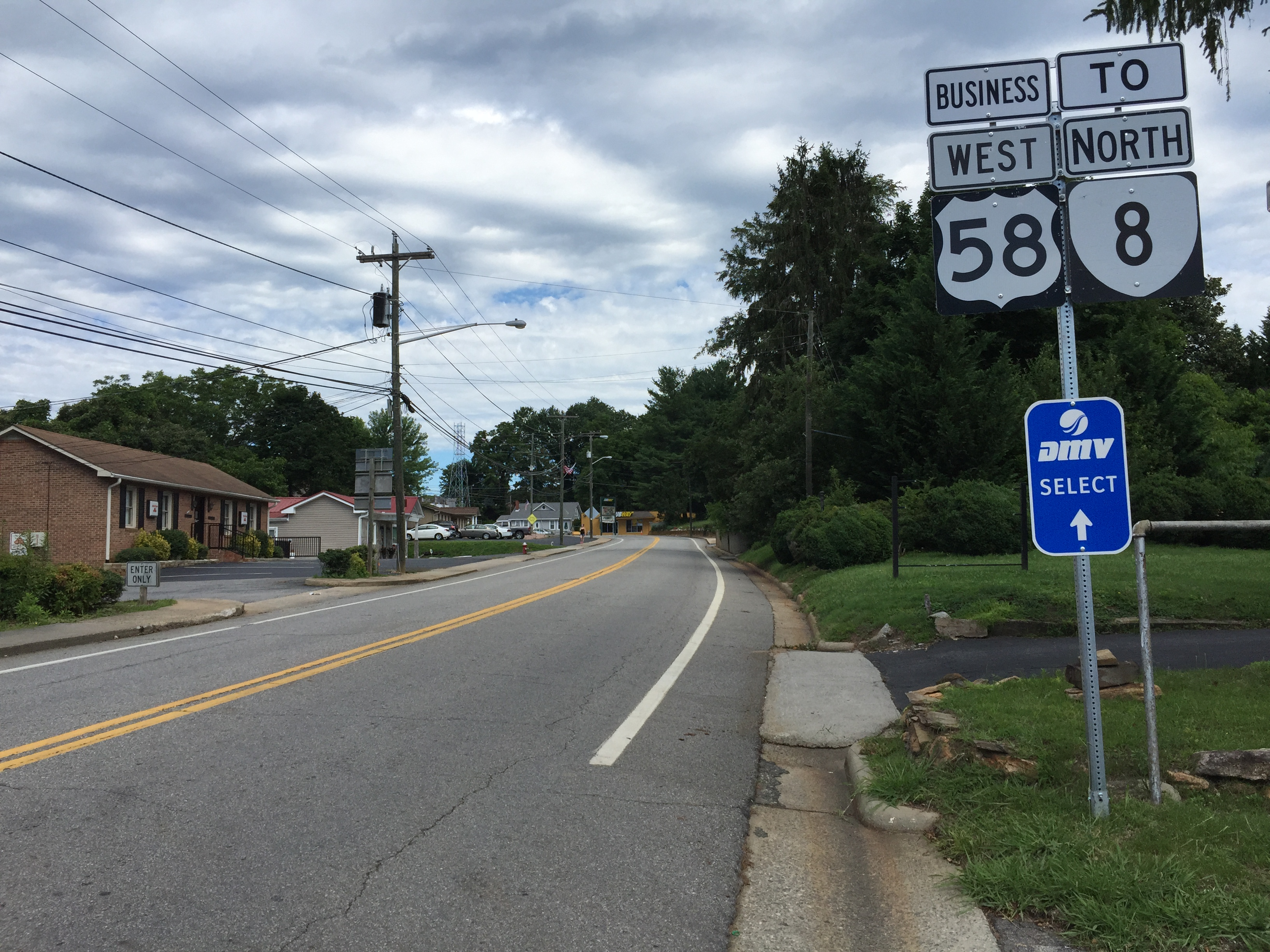
View west on US 58 Bus. and north on SR 8 Bus. in Stuart

U.S. Route 58 Business (US 58 Bus.) is a business route of US 58 in the Stuart, the county seat of Patrick County. The route begins eastbound at the northwestern edge of town at a ramp from US 58 and SR 8. US 58 Bus. and SR 8 travel briefly as a one-way road eastbound before intersecting a connector road which allows for access to and from US 58 west and SR 8 north. The two routes wind their way through Stuart on West Blue Ridge Street passing by small businesses and county offices. At Patrick Avenue, SR 8 exits the concurrency to the south leaving US 58 Bus. to continue on East Blue Ridge Street. The route heads downhill through a hairpin turn before turning north and ending at an intersection with US 58.

== Martinsville business loop ==
U.S. Route 58 Business
- Location: Martinsville
- Length: 9.90 mi (15.93 km)

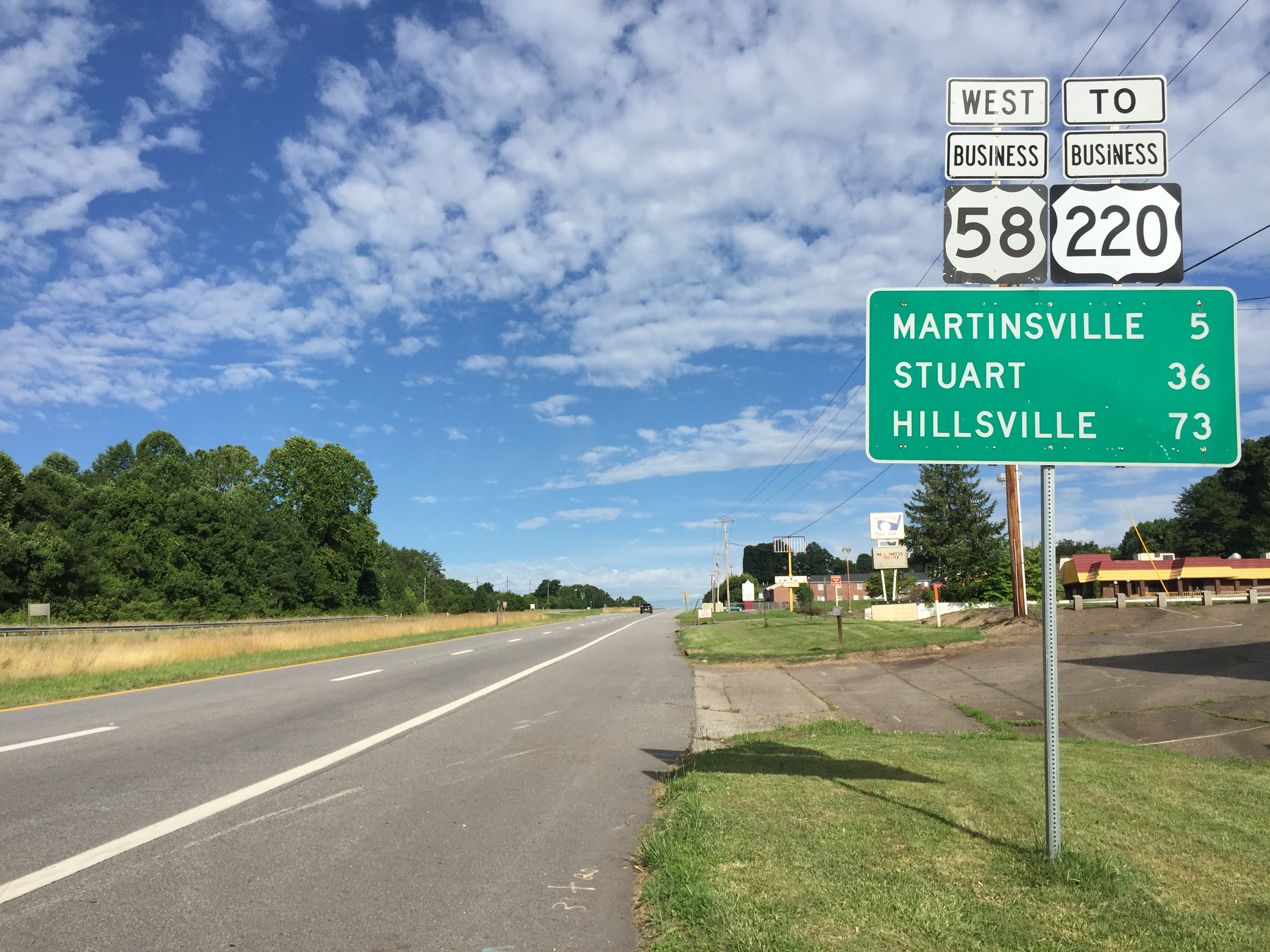
View west along US 58 Bus. at SR 930 just east of Martinsville

U.S. Route 58 Business (US 58 Bus.) is a ten-mile-long (16 km) business loop of US 58 serving the independent city of Martinsville. The route begins at an interchange southwest of Martinsville within the census-designated place (CDP) of Horsepasture. The interchange is where US 58 as a four-lane divided surface road joins the US 220 freeway bypassing Martinsville. US 58 Bus. continues northeast as a four-lane divided roadway to an interchange with US 220 Bus. The two routes head north into the city limits passing near businesses. At Starling Avenue, US 58 Bus. ends its concurrency with US 220 Bus. but forms another with SR 57. US 58 Bus. and SR 57 bypass the downtown of the city to the south and east but Starling Avenue does have many businesses and residences lining the road. The routes follow Starling Ave to its terminus, then turn east on East Church Street. When the routes exit the city limits, the road expands to a four-lane divided road again. At Chatham Road, SR 57 heads north while US 58 Bus. remains on the divided road. The business route ends at an interchange with US 58 east of the city in the CDP of Chatmoss.

== Danville business loop ==
U.S. Route 58 Business
- Location: Danville
- Length: 11.58 mi (18.64 km)

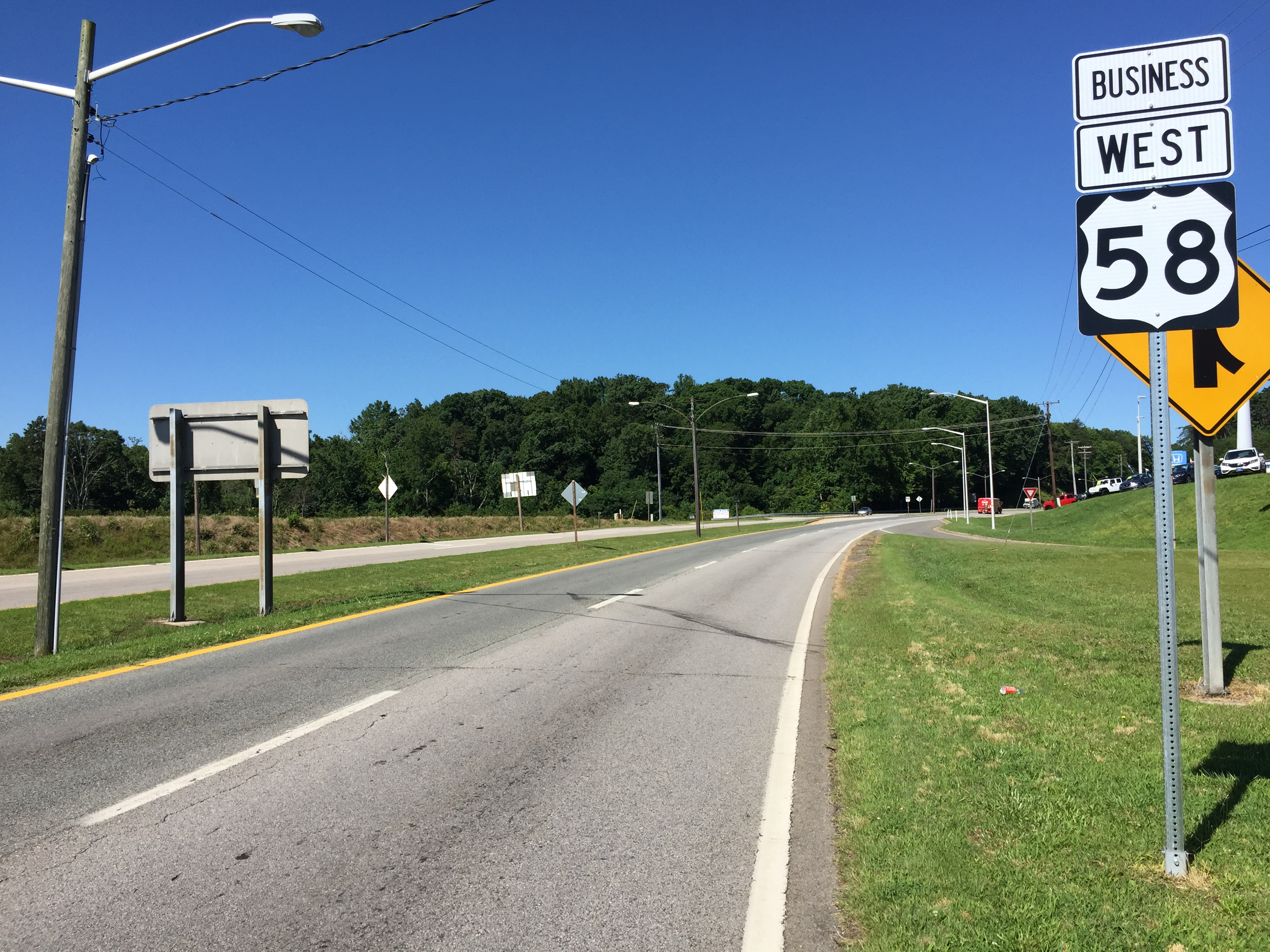
View west along US 58 Bus. in Danville

U.S. Route 58 Business (US 58 Bus.) is a business loop in Danville. The route begins at an interchange with the western end of the Danville Expressway (US 58) west of the city in Pittsylvania County. Just east of this interchange, the route intersects the northern terminus of US 311 Alt. (former US 311 south since November 2024) which travels south into North Carolina. Near the Danville city limits, US 58 Bus. intersects the western terminus of SR 51, another loop route in Danville. Upon entering Danville, the road name changes from Martinsville Highway to Riverside Drive. As the route approaches the Dan River, the route has an interchange with Piedmont Drive and is surrounded by big-box stores when it curves to parallel the river. Past an intersection that serves as the eastern terminus of SR 51, US 58 Bus. has a cloverleaf interchange with US 29 Bus. (also serving as the northern terminus of SR 86). Still north of the river, at the intersection of Riverside Drive and Main Street, numerous state and U.S. routes are present. US 360 officially begins at this intersection, SR 293 passes north and south of here on Main Street, and SR 360's southern terminus is present at this intersection. Now named River Street as it heads east, US 58 Bus. and US 360 winds its way through eastern Danville along the river. When the road crosses Fall Creek, the road name changes again to South Boston Road. The road expands to a divided highway before ending at a cloverleaf interchange with the Danville Expressway. US 29 passes north and south through the interchange, US 58 is on the expressway south of here and on the highway east of here, US 360 continues on the highway east, and the unsigned SR 785 (future Interstate 785) has its northern terminus at this interchange.

== Clarksville business loop ==
U.S. Route 58 Business
- Location: Clarksville
- Length: 3.24 mi (5.21 km)

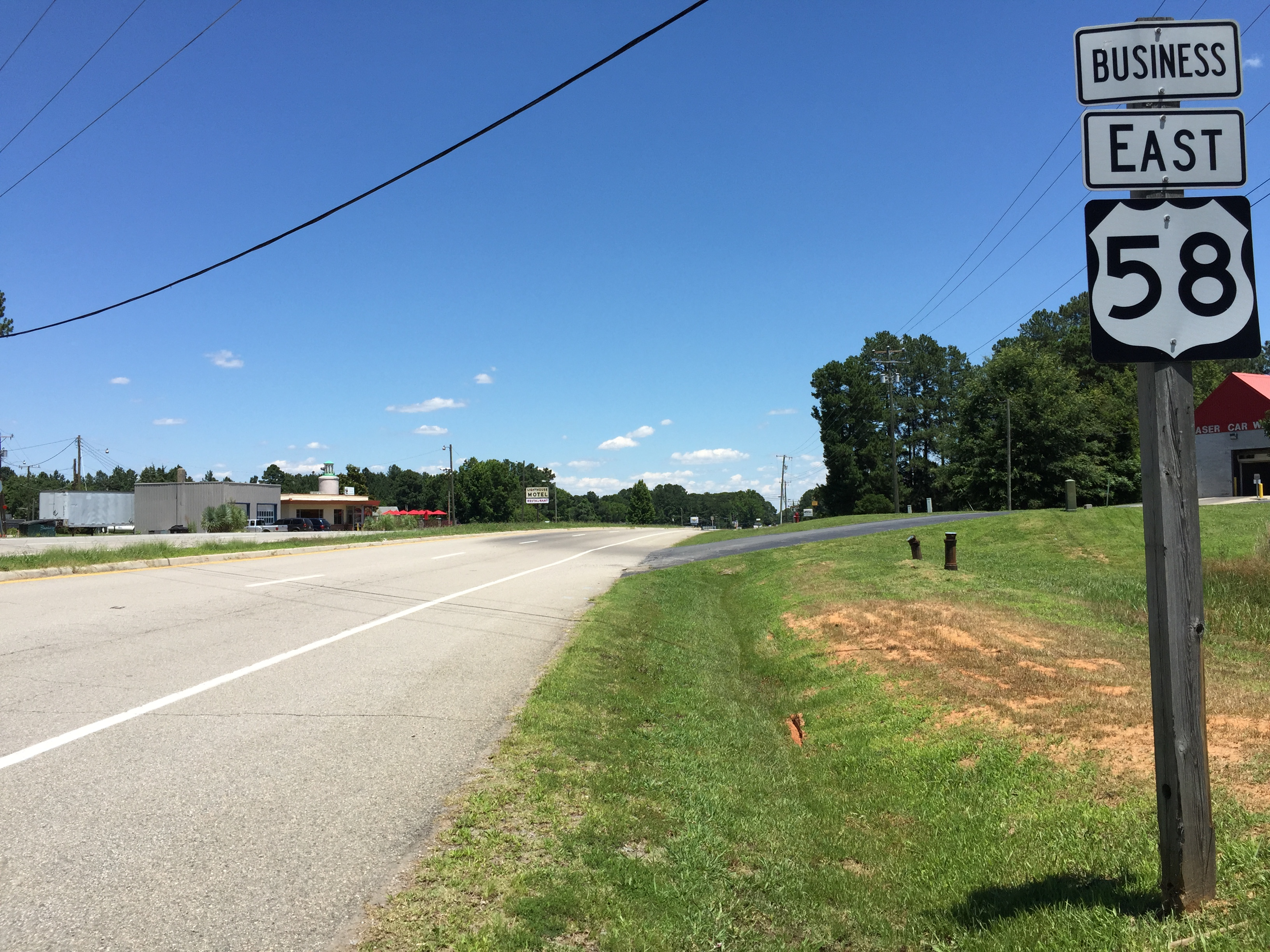
View east along US 58 Bus. at SR 1133 just west of Clarksville

U.S. Route 58 Business (US 58 Bus.) is a business route serving the town of Clarksville in Mecklenburg and Halifax counties. The route begins at an intersection with US 58 and SR 49 southwest of Clarksville and heads northeast along Virginia Avenue through the town. In the center of town, US 15 joins Virginia Avenue through the town. As the two roads cross the Roanoke River, the routes briefly enter Halifax County before reentering Mecklenburg County. At the east end of the causeway that crosses the river, the intersection of US 15 and SR 49, the US 58 Bus. designation officially ends though in order to return to US 58 east, one must take another ramp to get back to the mainline.

== Boydton business loop ==
U.S. Route 58 Business
- Location: Boydton
- Length: 1.08 mi (1.74 km)

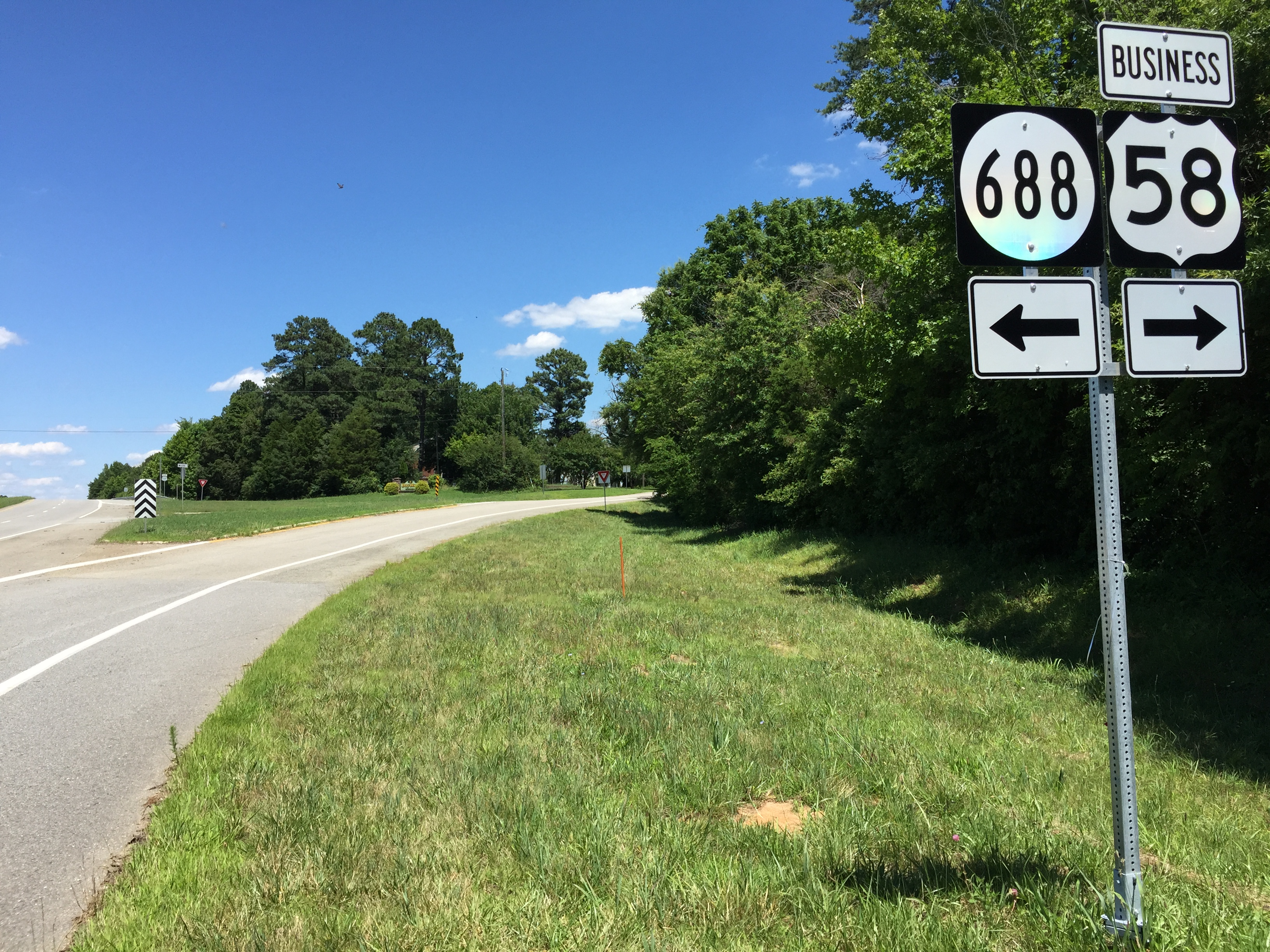
View east at the west end of US 58 Bus. at US 58 in Boydton

U.S. Route 58 Business (US 58 Bus.) is a one-mile-long (1.6 km) business loop of US 58 in Boydton, Mecklenburg County. The route begins at the intersection of US 58 and Madison Street west of the town center. It travels due east through Boydton intersecting the southern terminus of SR 92 in the center of town. East of the downtown, the route curves to the north and ends at another intersection with US 58.

== South Hill business loop ==
U.S. Route 58 Business
- Location: South Hill
- Length: 4.12 mi (6.63 km)

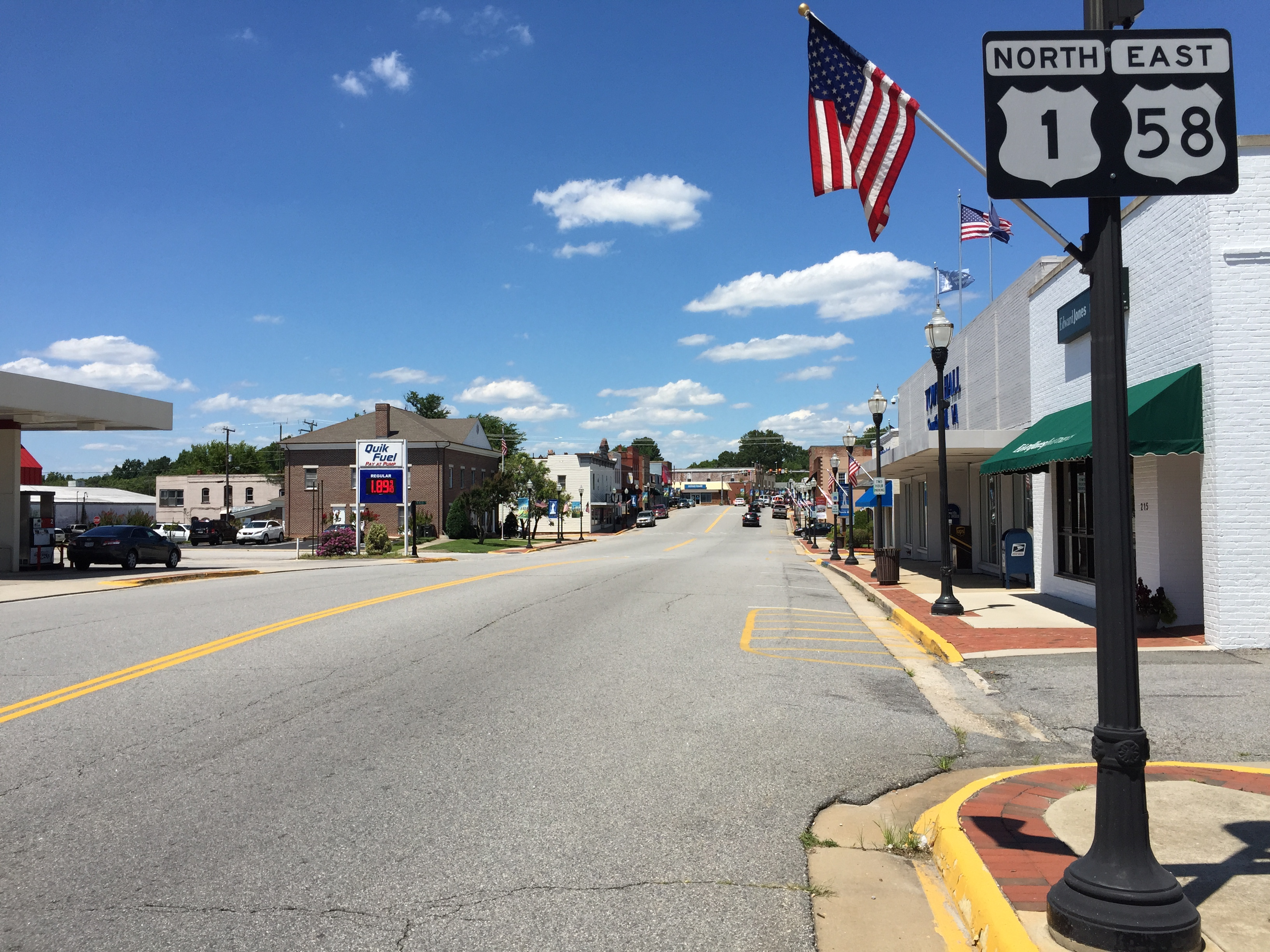
View north along US 1 and east along US 58 Bus. in South Hill

U.S. Route 58 Business (US 58 Bus.) is a business loop of US 58 serving the town of South Hill, Mecklenburg County. For most of the route, it is concurrent with US 1, with the remaining section concurrent with Virginia State Route 47. Through South Hill, US 58 Bus. follows US 1 along West Danville Street and South Mecklenburg Street, then turns east along SR 47 on East Atlantic Street.

== Lawrenceville business loop ==
U.S. Route 58 Business
- Location: Lawrenceville
- Length: 2.60 mi (4.18 km)

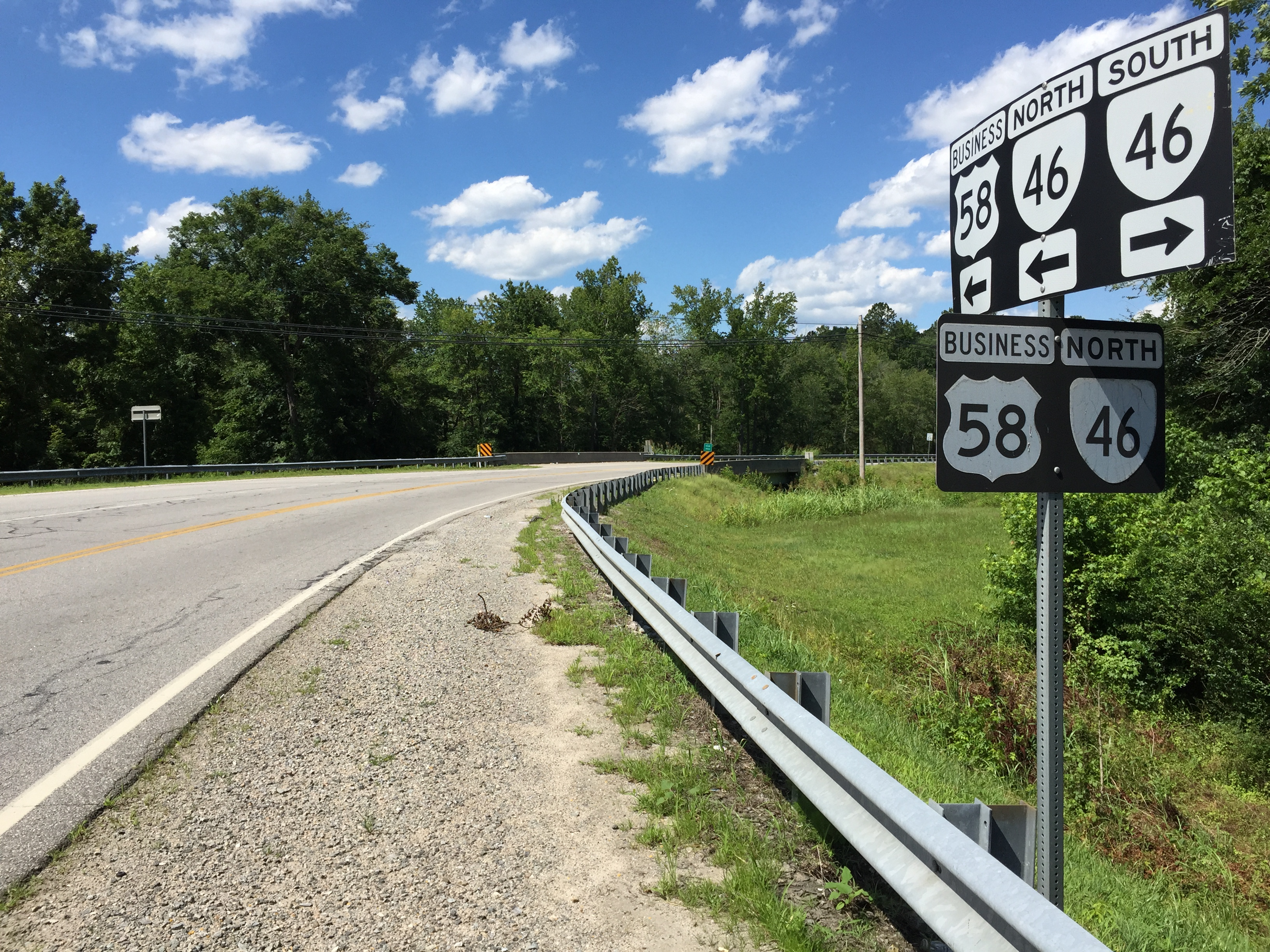
US 58 Bus. eastbound and SR 46 northbound at SR 694 near Lawrenceville

U.S. Route 58 Business (US 58 Bus.) is a business route from US 58 serving the Brunswick County town of Lawrenceville. The route begins at a diamond interchange with US 58 and SR 46 south of the town center. US 58 Bus. and SR 46 together head north on Hicks Street. After making some turns in central Lawrenceville, the two routes turn left onto Main Street. After SR 46 leaves the concurrency at Church Street, US 58 Bus. heads northeast out of the town on Lawrenceville Plank Road before ending at a folded diamond interchange with US 58.

== Emporia business loop ==
U.S. Route 58 Business
- Location: Emporia
- Length: 2.10 mi (3.38 km)

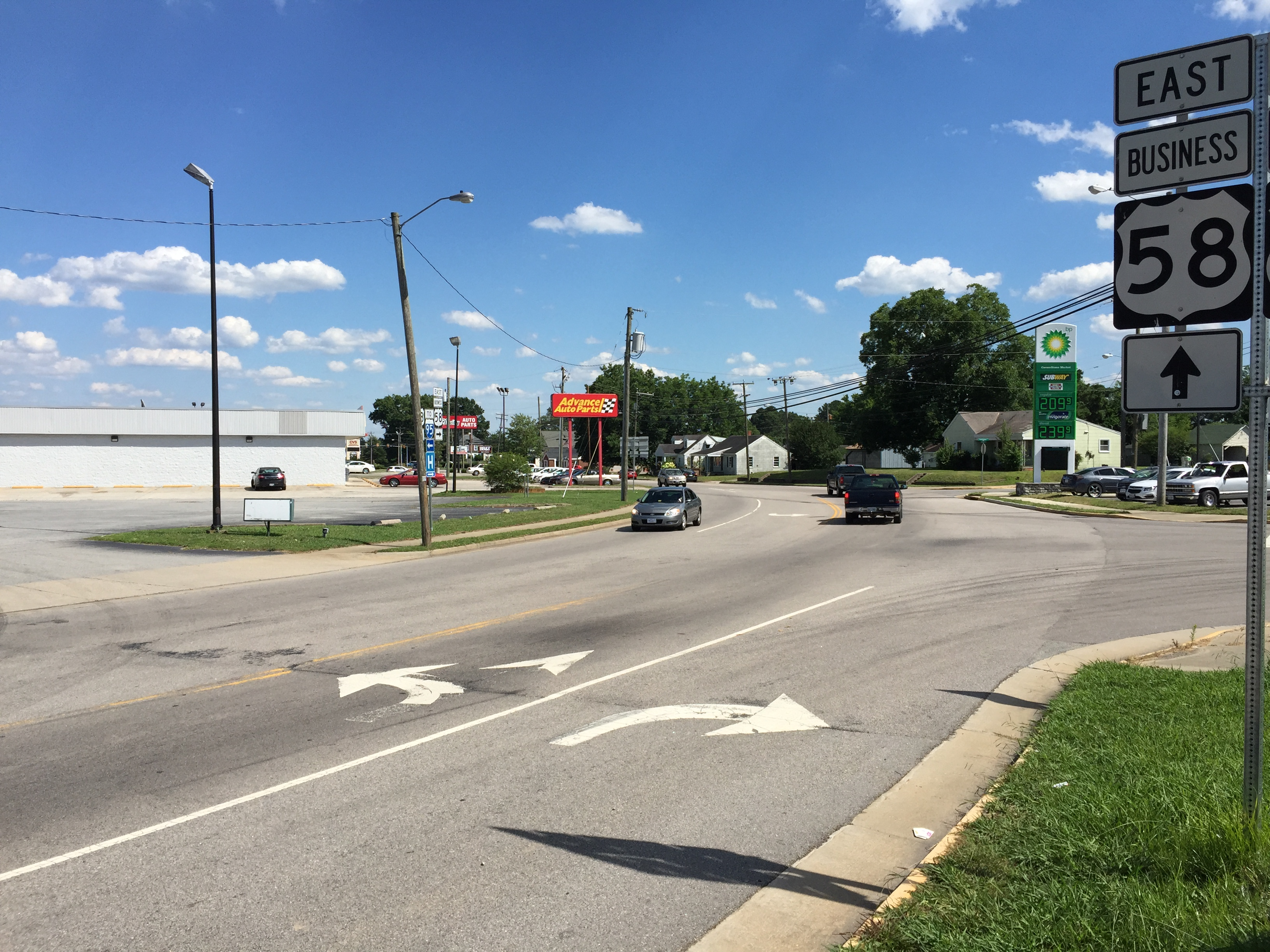
View east along US 58 Bus. in Emporia

U.S. Route 58 Business (US 58 Bus.) is a business loop of US 58 in the independent city of Emporia. US 58 Bus. travels on the two-lane Atlantic Street through Emporia's central business district while US 58 bypasses the center of the city on a four-lane divided expressway.=

== Courtland business loop ==
U.S. Route 58 Business
- Location: Courtland
- Length: 4.45 mi (7.16 km)

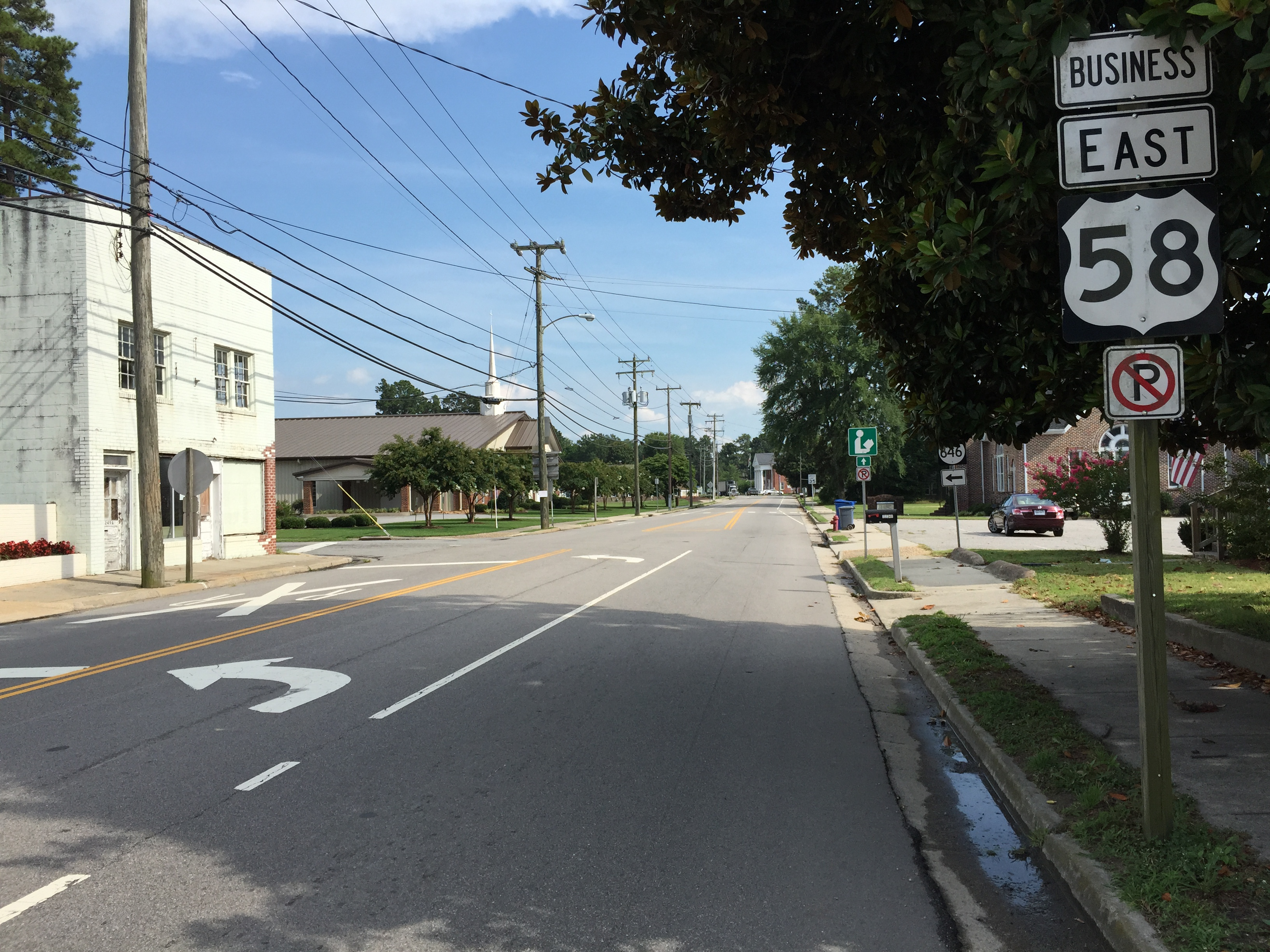
View east along US 58 Bus. in downtown Courtland

U.S. Route 58 Business (US 58 Bus.) serves as a business loop to US 58 to the town of Courtland, Southampton County. The route begins at a diamond interchange with US 58 and SR 35 southwest of the town. US 58 and SR 35 head northeast towards the town on Meherrin Road. At a T-intersection in the center of Courtland, SR 35 heads north on Main Street while US 58 Bus. turns right and heads southeast through the town on Main Street. Upon exiting Courtland town limits, the road name changes to Jerusalem Road and becomes a four-lane divided highway. Near the end of the route, US 58 Bus. curves sharply to the south to end at a signalized intersection with US 58.

== Franklin business loop ==
U.S. Route 58 Business
- Location: Franklin–Holland
- Length: 15.32 mi (24.66 km)

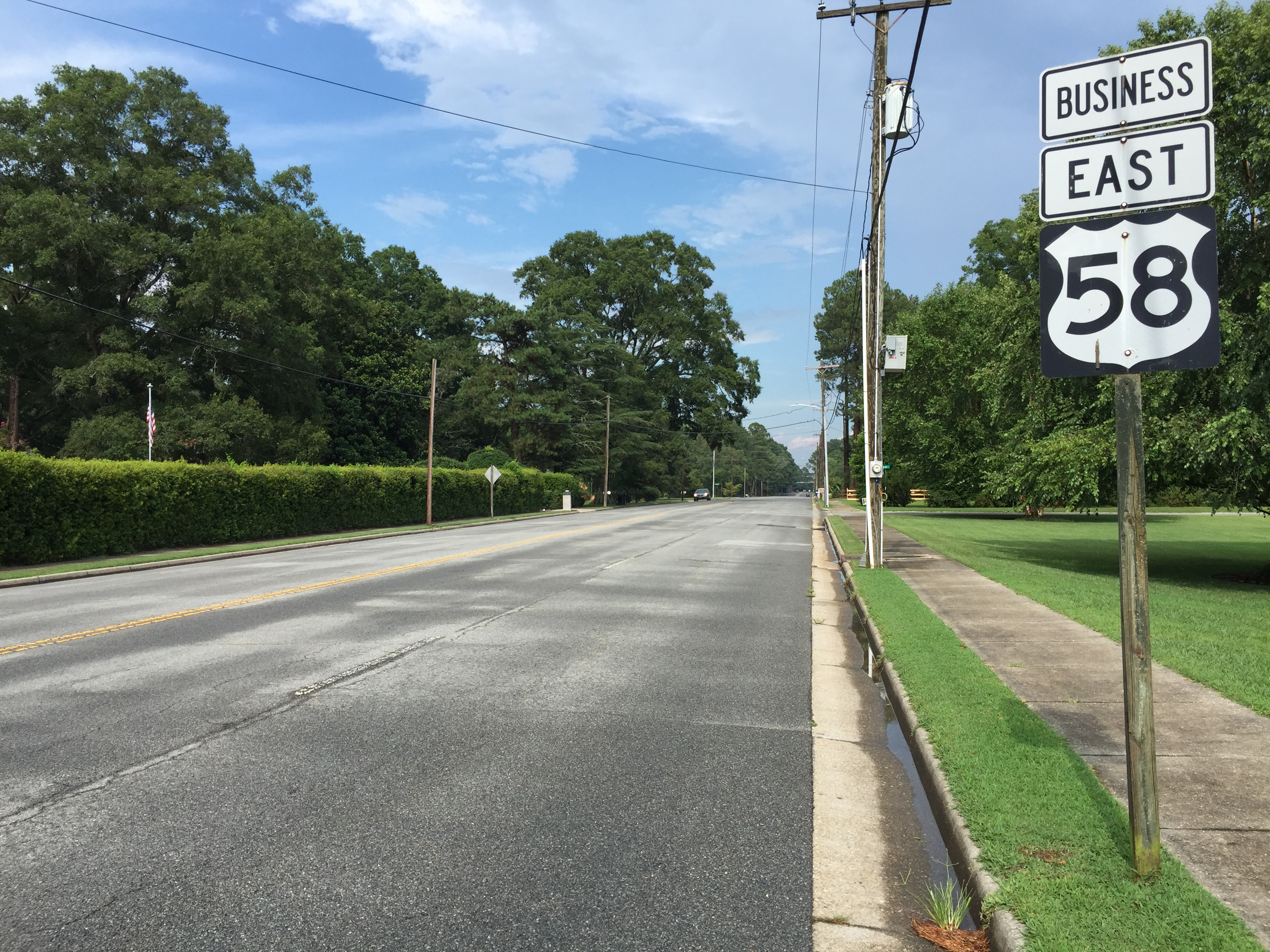
View east along US 58 Bus. in Franklin

U.S. Route 58 Business (US 58 Bus.) is a 15-mile-long (24 km) business route of US 58 serving the city of Franklin, the Isle of Wight County communities of Camptown and Carrsville, and the unincorporated community of Holland within the independent city of Suffolk. Between Franklin and Camptown, US 58 Bus. is also concurrent with US 258 Bus. The route also intersects US 258 in Camptown and SR 189 in Holland.

== Suffolk business loop ==
U.S. Route 58 Business
- Location: Suffolk
- Length: 6.69 mi (10.77 km)

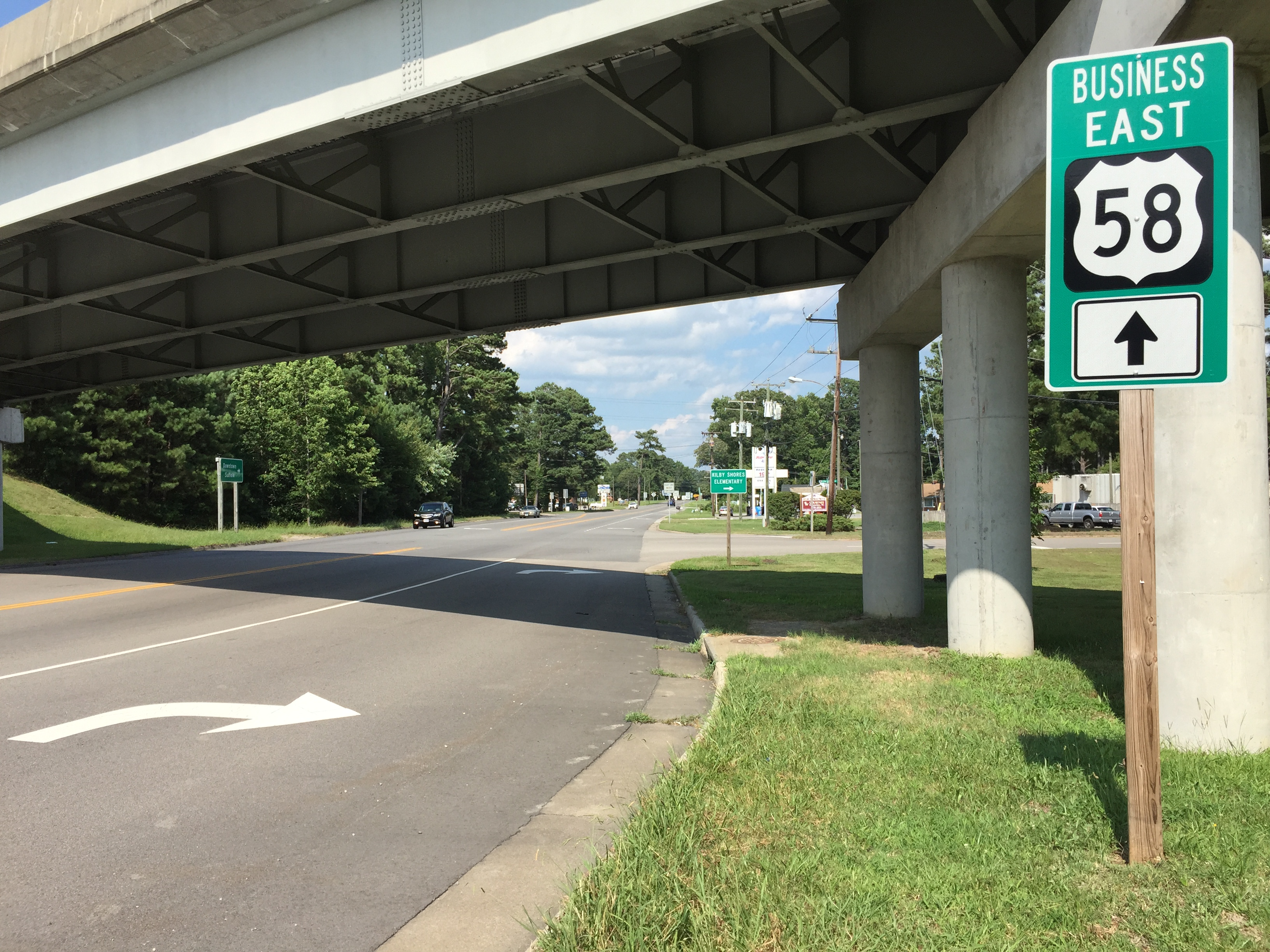
View east along US 58 Bus. at US 58 and US 13 in Suffolk

U.S. Route 58 Business (US 58 Bus.) is a business route of US 58 serving downtown Suffolk. The route begins west of downtown Suffolk within a trumpet interchange between US 58 and US 13. US 58 Bus. travels along Holland Road and West Washington Street before making a left turn at West Constance Road (Washington Street continues as SR 337). Constance Road makes gentle curves around the north side of downtown Suffolk acting as a surface-road bypass of Suffolk as opposed to the freeway bypass of the city center to the north and west. At Main Street, US 58 Bus. intersects State Routes 10 and State Routes 32 along with US 13 Bus. and US 460 Bus.; US 13 Bus. and US 460 Bus. form a concurrency with US 58 Bus. east of this point. Eventually, the three routes become a part of the arrow-straight Portsmouth Boulevard and becomes a four-lane divided highway. At East Washington Street / Nansemond Parkway, US 58 Bus. again intersects SR 337. The three routes end a short distance later at an interchange with US 13, US 58, and US 460 east of downtown.

== Virginia Beach business spur ==
U.S. Route 58 Business
- Location: Virginia Beach
- Length: 3.97 mi (6.39 km)

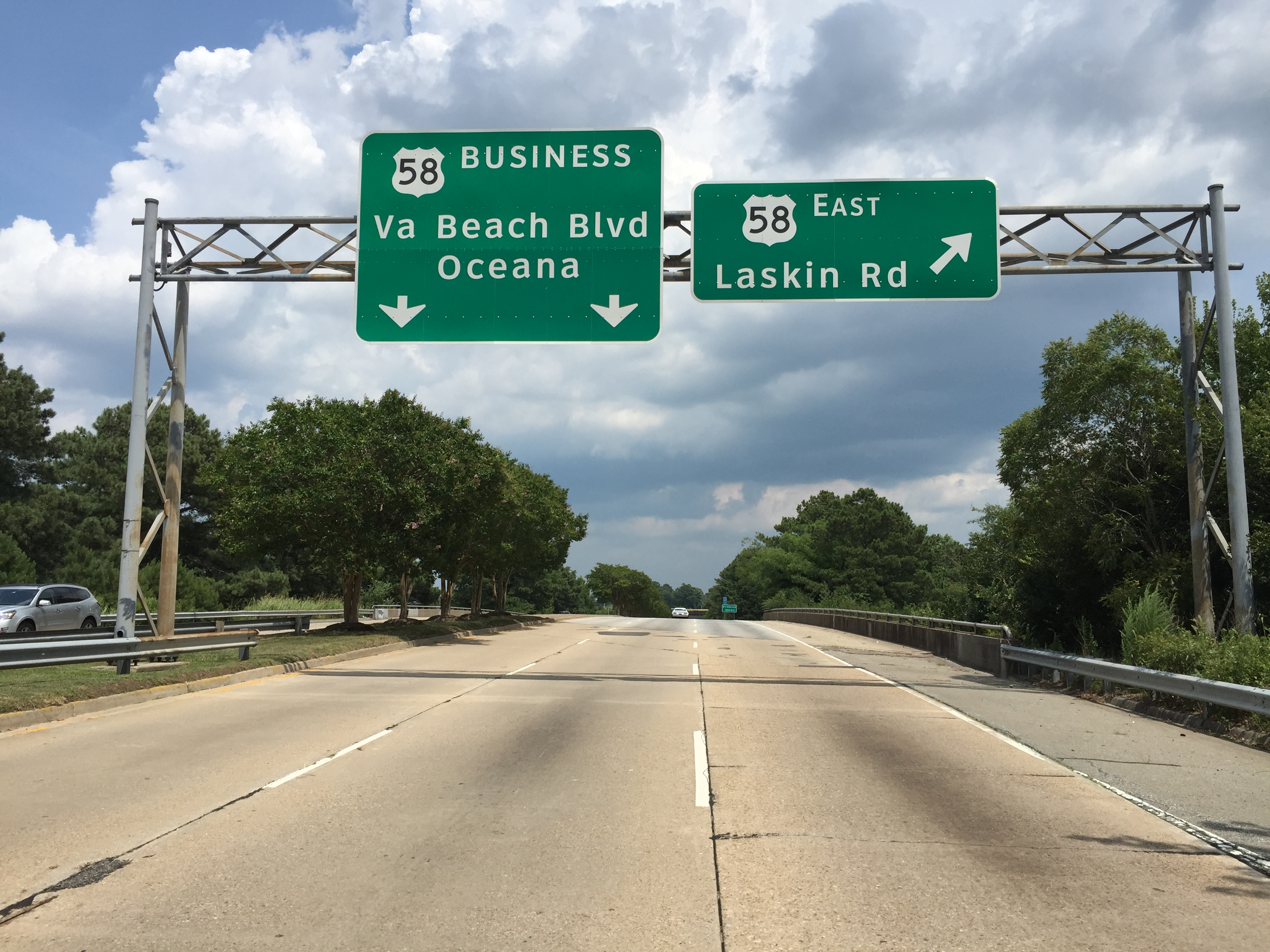
View east along US 58 at US 58 Bus. in Virginia Beach

U.S. Route 58 Business (US 58 Bus.) is the designation for the easternmost four miles (6.4 km) of Virginia Beach Boulevard in the city of Virginia Beach. The designation begins at an interchange with US 58 east of SR 279 and north of I-264 and heads due east. For its last block, the route is also called 17th Street. The US 58 Bus. designation ends at US 60 (Atlantic Avenue).

== U.S. Route 58 Alternate ==
U.S. Route 58 Alternate
- Location: Jonesville–Abingdon
- Length: 87.2 mi (140.3 km)
- Tourist routes: Virginia Byway

U.S. Route 58 Alternate (US 58 Alt.) is a 87.40-mile-long (140.66 km) alternate route to US 58 in western Virginia. The route is a northern bypass to US 58 which stays closer to the Tennessee border and serves Gate City and Bristol. US 58 Alt. begins at an intersection in Jonesville at Main Street and Hill Street; US 58 travels east and west through Jonesville, but US 58 Alt. curves to the north out of the town. The route follows the Trail of the Lonesome Pine through the towns of Pennington Gap and Dryden before entering Big Stone Gap. In the center of Big Stone Gap, US 58 Alt. forms a concurrency with US 23 Bus.; the two routes head east through the town before coming to an interchange with US 23. US 23 and US 58 Alt. together head northeast over the Little Stone Mountain on an expressway into Norton. A business loop of US 58 Alt. travels through Norton while US 58 Alt. and US 23 bypass the city to the south. At the interchange with SR 283, US 58 Alt. breaks away from the expressway and travels east to Coeburn then southeast through St. Paul and Castlewood. At Hansonville, US 58 Alt. and US 19 form a concurrency heading southeast towards Abingdon. Northwest of the town, US 58 Alt. becomes an independent highway briefly until reaching US 11 (Main Street) in Abingdon. The two routes head northeast for two blocks when the road comes to the intersection of Main Street and Cummings Street. At this intersection, US 58 Alt. turns south onto Cummings Street which also carries the northernmost segment of SR 75. US 58 Alt. ends at the interchange with I-81 and US 58 (I-81's exit 17). SR 75 continues south on the surface road towards Tennessee.

== Norton alternate business loop ==
U.S. Route 58 Alternate Business
- Location: Norton
- Length: 1.91 mi (3.07 km)

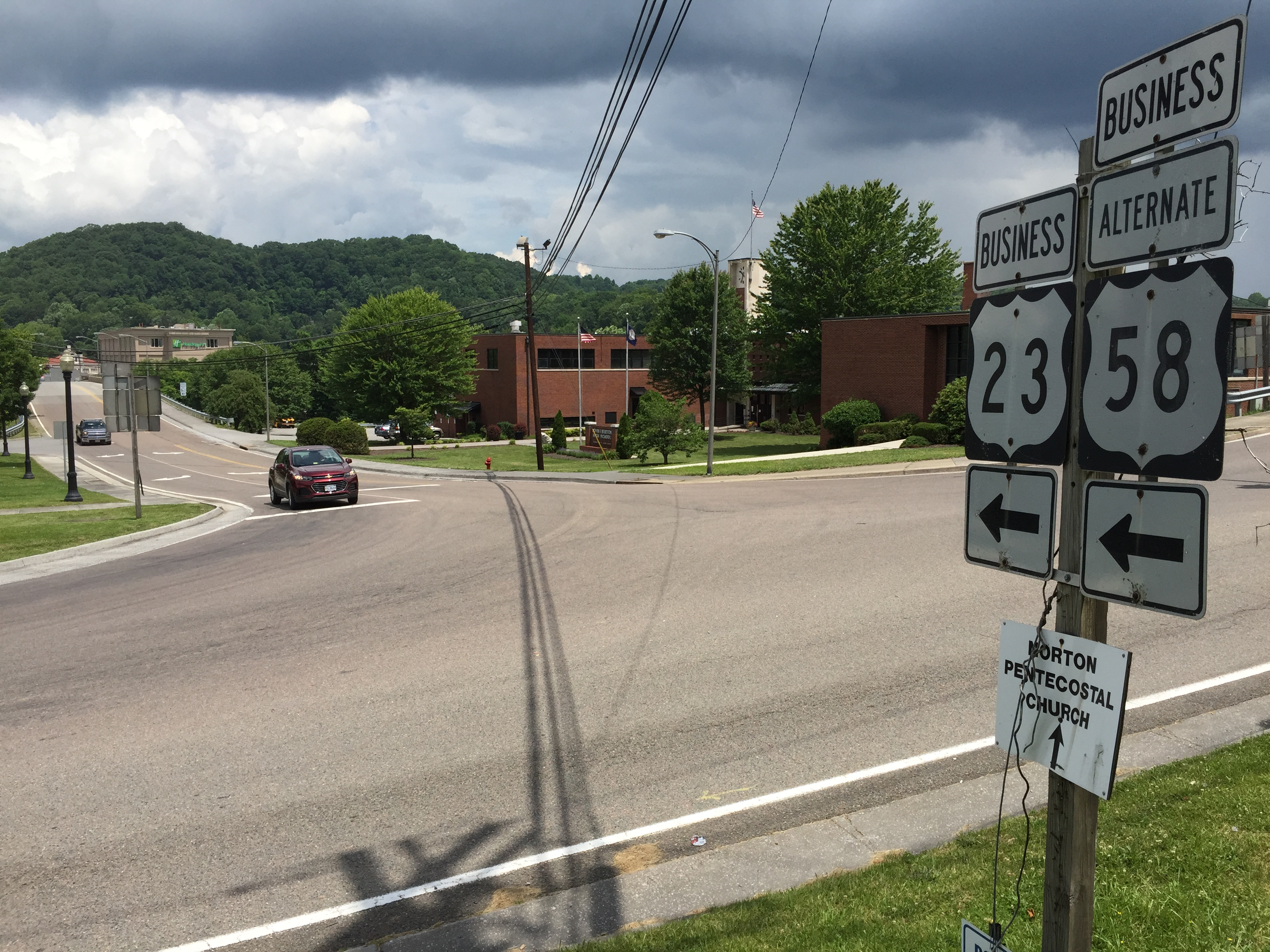
US 58 Alt. Bus. eastbound in Norton

U.S. Route 58 Alternate Business (US 58 Alt. Bus.) is a business route of US 58 Alternate entirely within the independent city of Norton. US 58 Alt. Bus. is one of the few U.S. Routes with two plates above its shield that ever existed in the country. US 58 Alt. Bus. begins at an interchange with the US 58 Alt. and US 23 freeway south of Norton. The route heads north along 12th Street and turns left onto 11th Street at Kentucky Avenue. After passing over a railroad, US 58 Alt. Bus. turns right onto Park Avenue (US 23 Bus.). The two routes intersect SR 74 at its western terminus Coeburn Avenue. After passing through the main business district of Norton, US 23 Bus. turns north off of the main route and the unsigned SR 283 begins while concurrent with US 58 Alt. Bus. The business route ends at a partial cloverleaf interchange with US 23 and US 58 Alt. east of Norton. At this point, US 58 Alt.'s concurrency with US 23 ends and the road continues east towards Coeburn.

Some signs along the U.S. Route 58 Alternate Business display the route name as "Alternate Business US 58" and the signs on the US 23 freeway simply refer to the route as "Business US 58."

== Dryden business loop ==
U.S. Route 58 Business
- Location: Dryden
- Length: 1.72 mi (2.77 km)

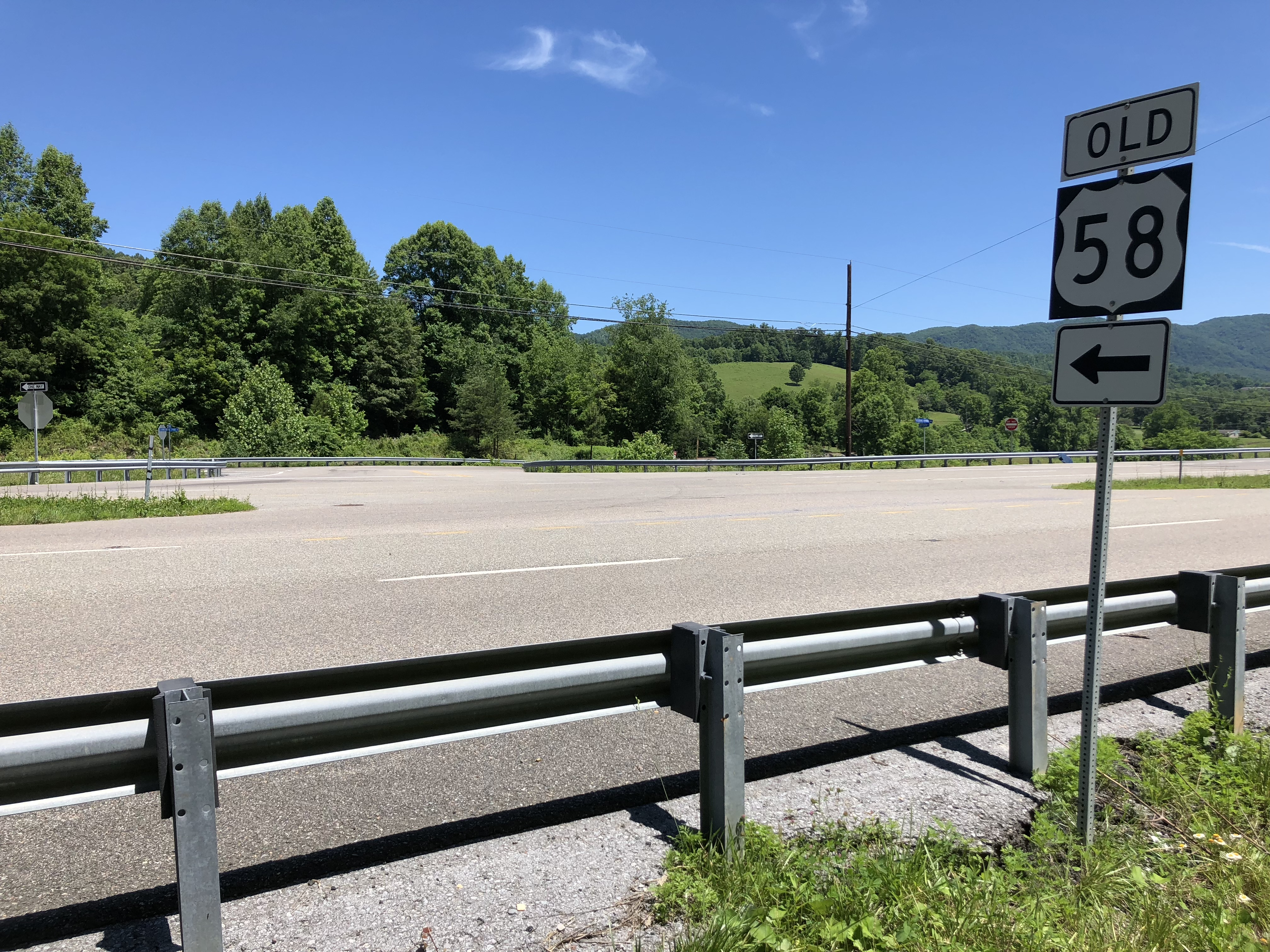
View east at the west end of US 58 Bus. at US 58 Alt. in Dryden

U.S. Route 58 Business (US 58 Bus.) is a business route of US 58 Alternate in Dryden, Lee County. Signed as Old US 58, the route follows the original alignment of US 58 Alternate through the center of the community.

== See also ==
- List of special routes of the United States Numbered Highway System
