= List of U.S. Highways in Virginia =

United States Numbered Highway System
- US Route markers
- U.S. Highways in Virginia highlighted in red

System information
- Notes: Outside cities, some towns, and two counties, every road is state-maintained. These roads are split into Primary and Secondary State Routes, and receive different levels of funding. Inside cities, most Primary State Routes are locally maintained.

Highway names
- Interstates: Interstate X (I-X)
- US Highways: U.S. Route X (US X)
- State: State Route X (SR X) or Virginia Route X (VA X)

System links
- Virginia Routes; Interstate; US; Primary; Secondary; Byways; History; HOT lanes

United States Numbered Highways in the state of Virginia are numbered by the American Association of State Highway and Transportation Officials (AASHTO) and maintained by the Virginia Department of Transportation as part of the system of state highways. In Virginia, U.S. Highways are treated, for funding purposes, as identical to primary state highways and receive more funding than secondary state routes.

== Mainline highways ==
| Number | Length (mi) | Length (km) | Southern or western terminus | Northern or eastern terminus | Formed | Removed | Notes |
|---|---|---|---|---|---|---|---|
| US 1 | 196.55 | 316.32 | US 1 at the North Carolina state line | US 1 at the District of Columbia line | 1926 | current | |
| US 11 | 339.41 | 546.23 | US 11E & US 11W in Bristol | US 11 at the West Virginia state line | 1926 | current | US 11 is split into US 11E and US 11W from the Tennessee state line to Bristol |
| US 11E | 0.58 | 0.93 | US 11E at the Tennessee state line | US 11 in Bristol | 1929 | current | |
| US 11W | 1.12 | 1.80 | US 11W at the Tennessee state line | US 11 in Bristol | 1929 | current | |
| US 13 | 129.06 | 207.70 | US 13 at the North Carolina state line | US 13 at the Maryland state line | 1926 | current | |
| US 15 | 230.37 | 370.74 | US 15 at the North Carolina state line | US 15 at the Maryland state line | 1926 | current | |
| US 17 | 255.83 | 411.72 | US 17 at the North Carolina state line | US 11/US 50/US 522 in Winchester | 1926 | current | Previously had a spur route: US 17-1 (1926–early 1930s) |
| US 19 | 88.89 | 143.05 | US 19 at the Tennessee state line | US 19 at the West Virginia state line | 1933 | current | |
| US 21 | 34.99 | 56.31 | US 21 at the North Carolina state line | I-81/US 52 in Wytheville | 1926 | current | |
| US 23 | 60.80 | 97.85 | US 23 at the Tennessee state line | US 23 at the Kentucky state line | 1931 | current | |
| US 25E | 0.8 | 1.3 | US 25E TN 32 TN State Line | US 25E KY State Line | 1926 | 1996 | Rerouted through Cumberland Gap Tunnel now US 58 |
| US 29 | 248.00 | 399.12 | US 29 at the North Carolina state line | US 29 at the District of Columbia line | 1931 | current | |
| US 33 | 135.60 | 218.23 | US 33 at the West Virginia state line | SR 33 in Richmond | 1938 | current | |
| US 48 | 14.26 | 22.95 | US 48 at the West Virginia state line | I-81 & SR 55 in Strasburg | 2002 | current | Signage not posted until 2017 |
| US 50 | 86.00 | 138.40 | US 50 at the West Virginia state line | US 50 at the District of Columbia line | 1926 | current | |
| US 52 | 85.00 | 136.79 | US 52 at the North Carolina state line | US 52 at the West Virginia state line | 1935 | current | |
| US 58 | 507.40 | 816.58 | US 58 TN 383 at the Tennessee state line | US 60 in Virginia Beach | 1932 | current | |
| US 60 | 302.69 | 487.13 | US 60 at the West Virginia state line | 5th Street in Virginia Beach | 1926 | current | |
| US 117 | — | — | — | — | 1926 | 1933 | Replaced by US 158 |
| US 121 | — | — | — | — | 1926 | 1935 | Replaced by US 52 |
| US 121 | 61.71 | 99.31 | US 23 in Pound | US 121 at the West Virginia state line | proposed | — | Under construction |
| US 158 | — | — | — | — | 1932 | 1940 | Rerouted into North Carolina |
| US 170 | — | — | — | — | 1926 | 1931 | Replaced by US 29 |
| US 211 | 59.09 | 95.10 | I‑81/SR 211 in New Market | US 15 Bus./US 29 Bus./US 211 Bus. in Warrenton | 1926 | current | |
| US 219 | 1.30 | 2.09 | US 460 in Rich Creek | US 219 at the West Virginia state line | 1934 | current | |
| US 220 | 185.96 | 299.27 | US 220 at the North Carolina state line | US 220 at the West Virginia state line | 1934 | current | |
| US 221 | 149.61 | 240.77 | US 221 at the North Carolina state line | US 29 Bus./US 460 Bus./US 501 Bus. in Lynchburg | 1932 | current | |
| US 250 | 166.74 | 268.34 | US 250 at the West Virginia state line | US 360 in Richmond | 1935 | current | |
| US 258 | 68.17 | 109.71 | US 258 at the North Carolina state line | SR 143 at Fort Monroe in Hampton | 1940 | current | |
| US 301 | 142.70 | 229.65 | US 301 at the North Carolina state line | US 301 at the Maryland state line | 1932 | current | |
| US 311 | — | — | — | — | 1926 | 1934 | Truncated into North Carolina |
| US 311 | 7.50 | 12.07 | US 311 at the North Carolina state line | US 58 Bus. in Bachelors Hall | 2012 | current | |
| US 321 | — | — | — | — | 1930 | 1933 | Replaced by US 421 |
| US 340 | 122.03 | 196.39 | US 11 north of Greenville | US 340 at the West Virginia state line | 1926 | current | Southern segment |
| US 340 | 0.57 | 0.92 | US 340 at the West Virginia state line | US 340 at the Maryland state line | 1926 | current | Northern segment |
| US 360 | 225.31 | 362.60 | US 58 Bus./SR 293/SR 360 in Danville | SR 644 in Reedville | 1933 | current | |
| US 401 | 31 | 50 | Clarksville, Virginia | South Hill, Virginia | 1927 | 1931 | Replaced by US 58 |
| US 411 | 110 | 180 | U.S. Route 25E in Cumberland Gap | Bristol Virginia | 1926 | 1932 | Replaced by US 58 |
| US 421 | — | — | — | — | 1932 | 1933 | Truncated into Tennessee |
| US 421 | 69.23 | 111.41 | US 421 at the Tennessee state line | US 421 at the Kentucky state line | 1950 | current | |
| US 460 | 79.59 | 128.09 | US 460 at the Kentucky state line | US 460 at the West Virginia state line | 1947 | current | Western segment |
| US 460 | 326.84 | 526.00 | US 460 at the West Virginia state line | US 60 in Norfolk | 1933 | current | Eastern segment |
| US 501 | 111.42 | 179.31 | US 501 at the North Carolina state line | US 60 in Buena Vista | 1926 | current | |
| US 511 | — | — | — | — | 1926 | 1929 | Replaced by US 11E |
| US 522 | 159.65 | 256.93 | US 60/SR 1002 west of Powhatan | US 522 at the West Virginia state line | 1944 | current | |
Former

== Special routes ==
| Number | Length (mi) | Length (km) | Southern or western terminus | Northern or eastern terminus | Formed | Removed | Notes |
|---|---|---|---|---|---|---|---|
| US 1 Bus. | — | — | — | — | — | — | |
| US 11 Bus. | — | — | — | — | — | — | |
| US 11 Bus. | — | — | — | — | — | — | |
| US 11 Alt. | — | — | Salem | Roanoke | — | — | |
| US 13 Bus. | — | — | — | — | — | — | |
| US 13 Bus. | — | — | — | — | — | — | |
| US 13 Bus. | — | — | — | — | — | — | |
| US 15 Bus. | — | — | — | — | — | — | |
| US 15 Bus. | — | — | — | — | — | — | |
| US 15 Bus. | — | — | — | — | — | — | |
| US 15 Bus. | — | — | — | — | — | — | |
| US 15 Bus. | — | — | — | — | — | — | |
| US 15 Bus. | — | — | — | — | — | — | |
| US 17 Bus. | — | — | — | — | — | — | |
| US 17 Bus. | — | — | — | — | — | — | |
| US 17 Bus. | — | — | — | — | — | — | |
| US 17 Bus. | — | — | — | — | — | — | |
| US 17 Bus. | — | — | — | — | — | — | |
| US 17 Bus. | — | — | — | — | — | — | |
| US 19 Bus. | — | — | — | — | — | — | |
| US 19 Bus. | — | — | — | — | — | — | |
| US 23 Bus. | — | — | — | — | — | — | |
| US 23 Bus. | — | — | — | — | — | — | |
| US 23 Bus. | — | — | — | — | — | — | |
| US 23 Bus. | — | — | — | — | — | — | |
| US 29 Bus. | — | — | — | — | — | — | |
| US 29 Bus. | — | — | — | — | — | — | |
| US 29 Bus. | — | — | — | — | — | — | |
| US 29 Bus. | — | — | — | — | — | — | |
| US 29 Bus. | — | — | — | — | — | — | |
| US 29 Bus. | — | — | — | — | — | — | |
| US 29 Bus. | — | — | Charlottesville | Charlottesville | — | — | |
| US 29 Bus. | — | — | — | — | — | — | |
| US 29 Bus. | — | — | — | — | — | — | |
| US 29 Bus. | — | — | — | — | — | — | |
| US 29 Bus. | — | — | — | — | — | — | |
| US 33 Bus. | — | — | — | — | — | — | |
| US 58 Bus. | — | — | — | — | — | — | |
| US 58 Bus. | — | — | — | — | — | — | |
| US 58 Bus. | — | — | — | — | — | — | |
| US 58 Bus. | — | — | — | — | — | — | |
| US 58 Bus. | — | — | — | — | — | — | |
| US 58 Bus. | — | — | — | — | — | — | |
| US 58 Bus. | — | — | — | — | — | — | |
| US 58 Bus. | — | — | — | — | — | — | |
| US 58 Bus. | — | — | — | — | — | — | |
| US 58 Bus. | — | — | — | — | — | — | |
| US 58 Bus. | — | — | — | — | — | — | |
| US 58 Bus. | — | — | — | — | — | — | |
| US 58 Bus. | — | — | — | — | — | — | |
| US 58 Bus. | — | — | — | — | — | — | |
| US 58 Bus. | — | — | Norfolk | US 60 in Virginia Beach | — | — | |
| US 58 Alt. | — | — | Jonesville | Abingdon | — | — | |
| US 58 Alt. Bus. | — | — | — | — | — | — | |
| US 60 Bus. | — | — | — | — | — | — | |
| US 211 Bus. | — | — | — | — | — | — | |
| US 211 Bus. | — | — | — | — | — | — | |
| US 211 Bus. | — | — | — | — | — | — | |
| US 220 Bus. | — | — | — | — | — | — | |
| US 220 Bus. | — | — | — | — | — | — | |
| US 220 Bus. | — | — | — | — | — | — | |
| US 220 Bus. | — | — | — | — | — | — | |
| US 220 Bus. | — | — | — | — | — | — | |
| US 250 Bus. | — | — | — | — | — | — | |
| US 258 Bus. | — | — | — | — | — | — | |
| US 258 Bus. | — | — | — | — | — | — | |
| US 301 Bus. | — | — | — | — | — | — | |
| US 301 Alt. | — | — | Petersburg | Petersburg | — | — | |
| US 340 Bus. | — | — | — | — | — | — | |
| US 360 Bus. | — | — | — | — | — | — | |
| US 360 Bus. | — | — | — | — | — | — | |
| US 360 Bus. | — | — | — | — | — | — | |
| US 360 Bus. | — | — | — | — | — | — | |
| US 421 Bus. | — | — | — | — | — | — | |
| US 460 Bus. | — | — | — | — | — | — | |
| US 460 Bus. | — | — | — | — | — | — | |
| US 460 Bus. | — | — | — | — | — | — | |
| US 460 Bus. | — | — | — | — | — | — | |
| US 460 Bus. | — | — | — | — | — | — | |
| US 460 Bus. | — | — | — | — | — | — | |
| US 460 Bus. | — | — | — | — | — | — | |
| US 460 Bus. | — | — | — | — | — | — | |
| US 460 Bus. | — | — | — | — | — | — | |
| US 460 Bus. | — | — | — | — | — | — | |
| US 460 Bus. | — | — | — | — | — | — | |
| US 460 Bus. | — | — | — | — | — | — | |
| US 460 Bus. | — | — | — | — | — | — | |
| US 460 Bus. | — | — | — | — | — | — | |
| US 460 Alt. | — | — | Salem | Salen | — | — | |
| US 460 Alt. | — | — | Chesapeake | Norfolk | 1952 | current | |
| US 501 Bus. | — | — | — | — | — | — | |
| US 522 Bus. | — | — | — | — | — | — | |
Former
