= Sovah Health – Danville =

Hospital in Virginia, US

Coordinates: 36°34′40.1″N 79°24′19.7″W

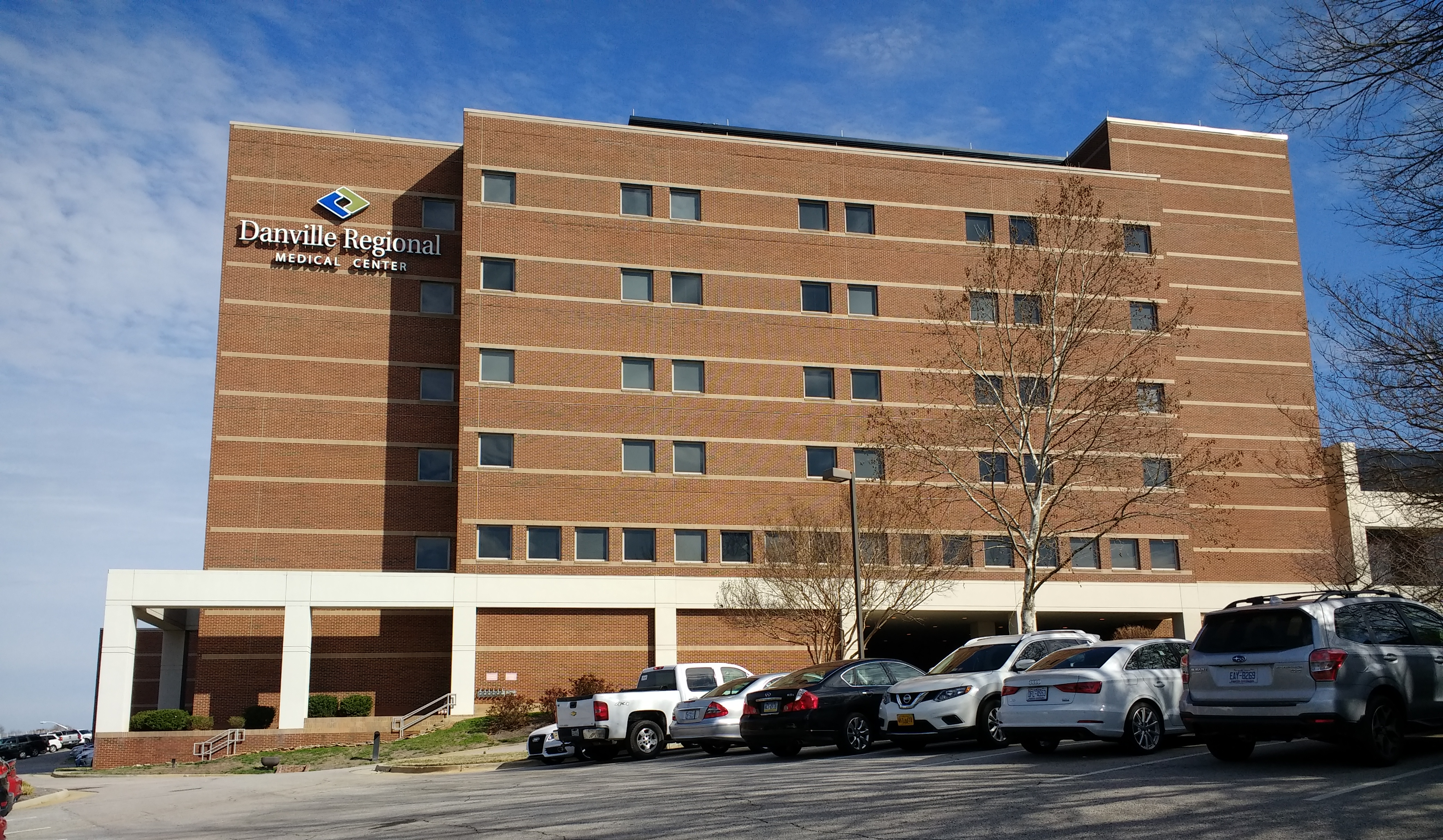

Geography
- Location: Danville, Virginia, United States

Services
- Beds: 250

Links
- Lists: Hospitals in Virginia

Sovah Health – Danville, previously known as Danville Regional Medical Center is a 250-bed hospital located in Danville, Virginia, US. It was formerly known as The Memorial Hospital and changed its name in 1993, before being purchased by Lifepoint Hospitals in July 2005.

The hospital is certified by the Joint Commission.
