= National Register of Historic Places listings in Patrick County, Virginia =

Location of Patrick County in Virginia

This is a list of the National Register of Historic Places listings in Patrick County, Virginia.

This is intended to be a complete list of the properties and districts on the National Register of Historic Places in Patrick County, Virginia, United States. The locations of National Register properties and districts for which the latitude and longitude coordinates are included below, may be seen in an online map.

There are 13 properties and districts listed on the National Register in the county, including 2 National Historic Landmarks. Another property was once listed but has been removed.

This National Park Service list is complete through NPS recent listings posted March 6, 2026.

== Current listings ==
	Name on the Register	Image	Date listed	Location	City or town	Description
1	Aurora	Aurora	February 4, 1991 (#91000015)	Penn Store Rd., south of its junction with U.S. Route 58; 36°36′04″N 80°03′10″W	Penn's Store	
2	Barnard Farm	Barnard Farm	May 21, 2009 (#09000338)	2878 Kibler Valley Rd. 36°37′54″N 80°27′14″W	Ararat	
3	Blue Ridge Parkway	Blue Ridge Parkway	December 13, 2024 (#100011353)	Blue Ridge Parkway through Virginia and North Carolina; 36°49′21″N 80°20′33″W	Woolwine vicinity	
4	Bluemont Presbyterian Church and Cemetery	Bluemont Presbyterian Church and Cemetery	March 30, 2007 (#07000219)	Milepost 192 on the Blue Ridge Parkway; 36°39′30″N 80°34′24″W	Fancy Gap	
5	Cockram Mill	Cockram Mill	December 6, 1990 (#90001842)	U.S. Route 58 east of its junction with Dan River Rd. 36°44′12″N 80°22′56″W	Meadows of Dan	
6	Goblintown Mill	Goblintown Mill	November 26, 2004 (#04001271)	888 Iron Bridge Rd. 36°47′32″N 80°09′30″W	Stuart	
7	Jack's Creek Covered Bridge	Jack's Creek Covered Bridge	May 22, 1973 (#73002050)	About 2 miles (3.2 km) south of Woolwine off State Route 8, over Jack's Creek; 36°45′52″N 80°16′25″W	Woolwine	
8	Mayberry Presbyterian Church	Mayberry Presbyterian Church	March 30, 2007 (#07000225)	1127 Mayberry Church Rd. 36°42′45″N 80°26′16″W	Meadows of Dan	
9	Patrick County Courthouse	Patrick County Courthouse	December 27, 1974 (#74002142)	Southeastern corner of Main and Blue Ridge Sts. 36°38′32″N 80°16′11″W	Stuart	
10	Reynolds Homestead	Reynolds Homestead	September 22, 1971 (#71000987)	North of Critz on Homestead Ln. 36°38′38″N 80°08′56″W	Critz	Also known as Rock Spring Plantation
11	Stuart Downtown Historic District		May 27, 2020 (#100006574)	Patrick Ave., Commerce, and South Main Sts. 36°38′12″N 80°16′11″W	Stuart	
12	Stuart Uptown Historic District	Stuart Uptown Historic District	January 24, 2002 (#01001512)	Main St. and Blue Ridge St. 36°38′30″N 80°16′12″W	Stuart	
13	J.E.B. Stuart Birthplace	J.E.B. Stuart Birthplace	September 24, 1998 (#98001161)	Northern side of the Ararat Highway, west of its junction with State Line Rd. 36°33′42″N 80°33′11″W	Ararat	

== Former listing ==
	Name on the Register	Image	Date listed	Date removed	Location	City or town	Description
1	Bob White Covered Bridge	Bob White Covered Bridge	May 22, 1973 (#73002049)	February 7, 2017	About 2.5 miles (4.0 km) south of Woolwine off VA 618, over the Smith River; 36°46′46″N 80°14′51″W	Woolwine	Destroyed by flood in 2015.

== See also ==
- List of National Historic Landmarks in Virginia
- National Register of Historic Places listings in Virginia
