= List of covered bridges in Virginia =

Below is a current list of covered bridges in Virginia. There are six historic covered bridges remaining in the U.S. state of Virginia, all still at their original locations.

Name	County	Location	Built	Length (ft)	Spans	Image	Notes
Biedler Farm	Rockingham	Broadway	1896	93	Smith Creek		One of the oldest covered bridges remaining in Virginia. Privately owned.
Humpback	Alleghany	Covington	1857	109	Dunlap Creek		The only arched covered bridge remaining in the United States.
Jack's Creek	Patrick	Woolwine	1914	48	Smith River		Only historic covered bridge remaining in Patrick County.
Link Farm	Giles	Newport	1912	49	Sinking Creek		Narrowest covered bridge in Virginia at 12 feet (3.7 m) wide. Privately owned.
Meems Bottom	Shenandoah	Mount Jackson	1894	204	North Fork of the Shenandoah River	Meems Bottom Covered Bridge	Currently the longest covered bridge in Virginia. Burned down on October 28, 1976. Rebuilt in 1978.
Sinking Creek	Giles	Newport	ca. 1916	71	Sinking Creek		

Below is a list of some of the other historic covered bridges in Virginia which were destroyed, removed, or altered.

Name	County	Location	Built	Length (ft)	Spans	Notes
Bob White	Patrick	Woolwine	1921	80	Smith River	Bridge was destroyed during major flooding on September 29, 2015.
Marysville	Campbell	Gladys	1878	60	Seneca River	Bridge was destroyed by a flood during Hurricane Fran in September 1996.
C.K. Reynolds	Giles	Newport	1919	36	Sinking Creek	Formerly was the shortest historic covered bridge in Virginia and privately owned. Destroyed by wind on March 1, 2017.
Trent	Cumberland	Cumberland	ca. 1844	145	Willis River	Bridge no longer extant.

== See also ==
- List of bridges documented by the Historic American Engineering Record in Virginia
- List of bridges on the National Register of Historic Places in Virginia
