= Jack's Creek Covered Bridge =

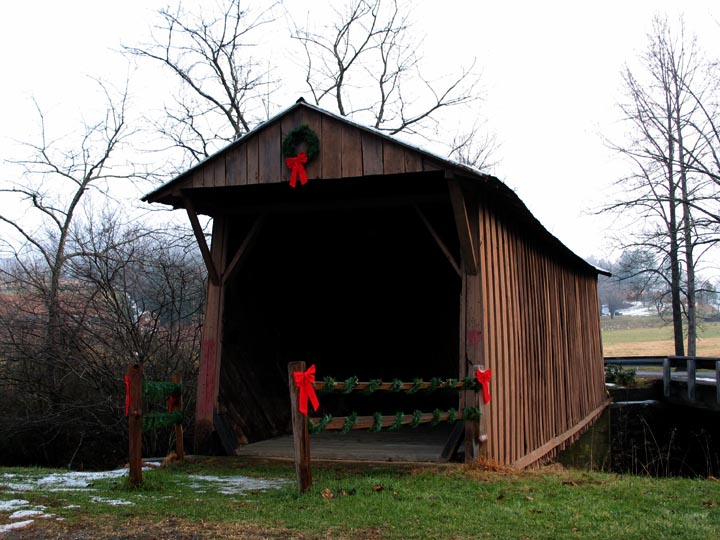
- Bridge near Woolwine, Virginia
- Jack's Creek Covered Bridge
- U.S. National Register of Historic Places
- Virginia Landmarks Register
- Location within Virginia Location within the United States
- Nearest city: Woolwine, VA
- Coordinates: 36°45′51.5″N 80°16′24.8″W
- Area: 9 acres (3.6 ha)
- Built: 1914
- NRHP reference No.: 73002050
- VLR No.: 070-0002

Significant dates
- Added to NRHP: May 22, 1973
- Designated VLR: April 17, 1973
- Carries: pedestrian traffic
- Crosses: Smith River
- Locale: Woolwine, Virginia
- Maintained by: Patrick County, VA
- ID number: 46-68-02 (WGCB)

Characteristics
- Design: Queen post truss
- Total length: 48 ft (15 m)

History
- Construction end: 1914

Location
- Interactive map of Jack's Creek Covered Bridge

The Jack's Creek Covered Bridge, also known as the Upper Covered Bridge, is a county-owned wooden covered bridge that spans the Smith River in Patrick County, Virginia, United States. It is located on Jack's Creek Road (SR 615) off State Route 8 just south of the community of Woolwine, about 11 miles (18 km) north of Stuart.

Built in 1914 (some sources say 1916), the 48-foot (15 m) bridge is a queenpost truss construction over a single span. Its WGCB number is 46-68-02. The Jack's Creek Covered Bridge was listed on the National Register of Historic Places on May 22, 1973. It is the only historic covered bridge remaining in Patrick County, maintained by the Patrick County government.

== History ==
The Jack's Creek Covered Bridge was designed by Walter G. Weaver of Woolwine and constructed in 1914 by Charlie Elam Vaughn of Buffalo Ridge, made of oak, built to serve Jack's Creek Primitive Baptist Church for which the bridge was named. Vaughn's great, great grandfather fought in the Revolutionary War. A steel-beam bridge replaced it in 1932. The Jack's Creek Covered Bridge was widened and received a new roof in 1969, followed by a full restoration by the Virginia Department of Highways in 1974, at a cost of approximately $4,550.00. Every June, the bridge is the site of the Patrick County Covered Bridge Festival.

On September 29, 2015, major flooding on the Smith River caused by days of heavy rain destroyed the nearby Bob White Covered Bridge. Jack's Creek Covered Bridge was able to survive the deluge.

== See also ==
- List of bridges on the National Register of Historic Places in Virginia
- List of covered bridges in Virginia
