= Philpott Lake =

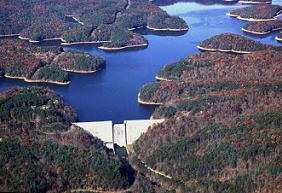

- Location within Virginia Location within the United States
- Location: Franklin / Patrick / Henry counties, Virginia
- Coordinates: 36°46′53″N 80°01′39″W
- Type: Reservoir
- Basin countries: United States
- Surface area: 2,900 acres (1,200 ha)
- Shore length^{1}: 100 mi (160 km)
- Surface elevation: 974 ft (297 m)
- ^{1} Shore length is not a well-defined measure.

Philpott Lake is a reservoir in the U.S. state of Virginia. It is impounded by Philpott Dam.

The lake is at an elevation of 974 feet (297 m), covers an area of 2,900 acres (12 km^{2}), and has a shoreline length of 100 miles (160 km). Philpott Lake extends into Franklin, Henry, and Patrick counties, Virginia. It is bordered by 6,424 acres (26.00 km^{2}) of U.S. Army Corps of Engineers-managed lands.

The lake and Philpott Dam were created to control flooding along the Smith River, to generate hydroelectric power, and to provide recreational activities. Construction on Philpott Dam began in 1948 and was completed in 1952.

Virginia state record lake trout and coho salmon were caught in Philpott Lake in 1966 and 1971, respectively. The last report of collection of a stocked Pacific salmon in this reservoir was in either late 1972 or January 1973, which may have been either a Chinook salmon or a coho.

== See also ==
- Fairy Stone State Park
- Fairystone Farms Wildlife Management Area
