= Virginia State Route 8 =

State highway in southwestern Virginia, US

State Route 8

Route information
- Maintained by VDOT
- Length: 55.88 mi (89.93 km)
- Existed: July 1, 1933–present

Major junctions
- South end: NC 8 near Palmetto
- US 58 in Stuart; SR 57 near Woolwine; SR 40 in Woolwine; US 221 in Floyd; I-81 in Christiansburg
- North end: US 11 in Christiansburg

Location
- Country: United States
- State: Virginia
- Counties: Patrick, Floyd, Montgomery

Highway system
- Virginia Routes; Interstate; US; Primary; Secondary; Byways; History; HOT lanes
← SR 7	→ SR 9

State Route 8 (SR 8) is a primary state highway in the U.S. state of Virginia. The state highway runs 55.88 miles (89.93 km) from the North Carolina state line near Palmetto, where the highway continues south as North Carolina Highway 8 (NC 8), north to U.S. Route 11 (US 11) in Christiansburg. SR 8 is part of a 151-mile (243 km) two-state highway 8 system and is the main north–south highway of Patrick County, Floyd County, and southern Montgomery County, connecting their respective county seats of Stuart, Floyd, and Christiansburg with each other and with the Blue Ridge Parkway. The state highway also links the New River Valley region of Virginia with Southside Virginia via US 58 and the Piedmont Triad of North Carolina via NC 8.

== Route description ==
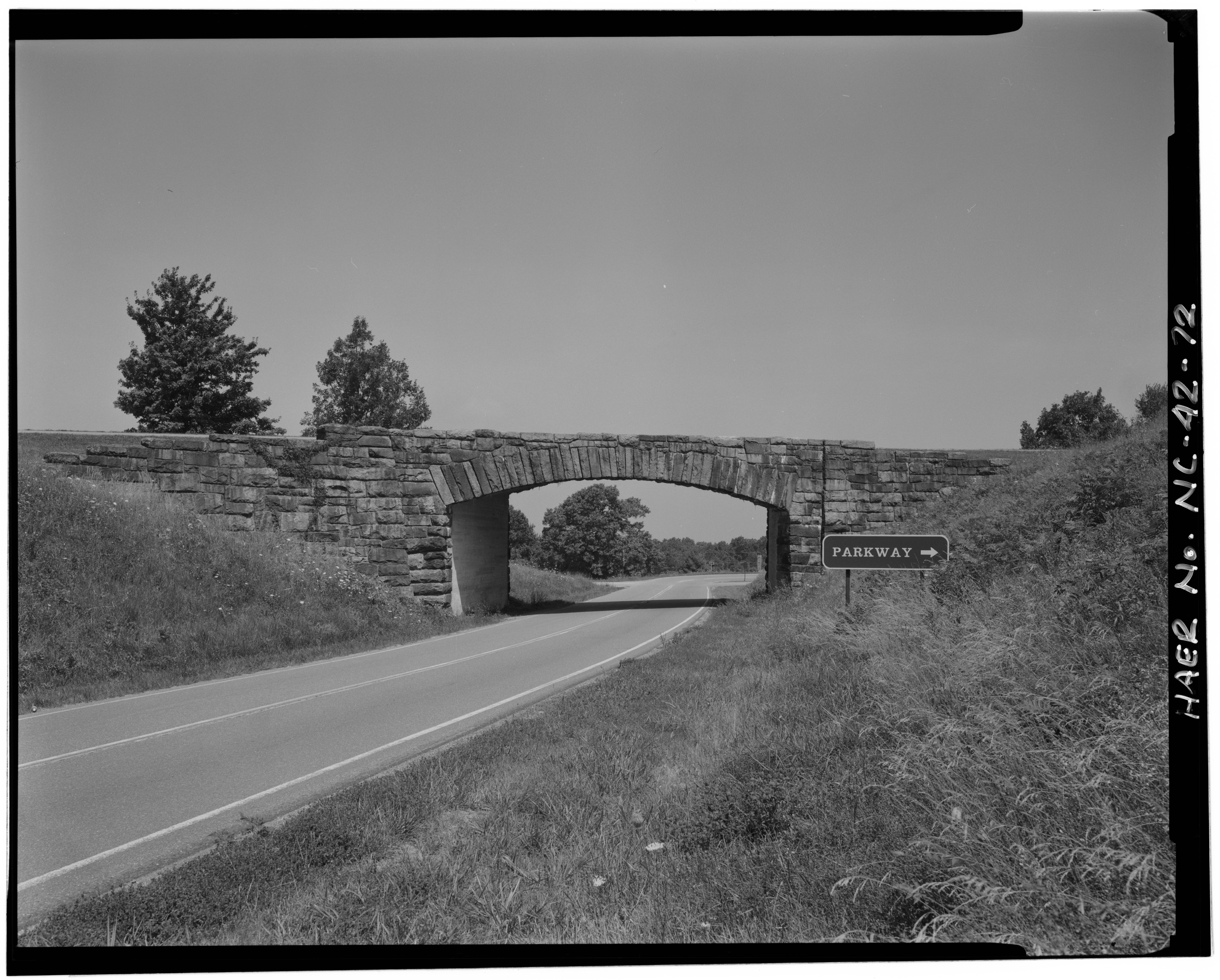
Photo of the bridge carrying the Blue Ridge Parkway over SR 8

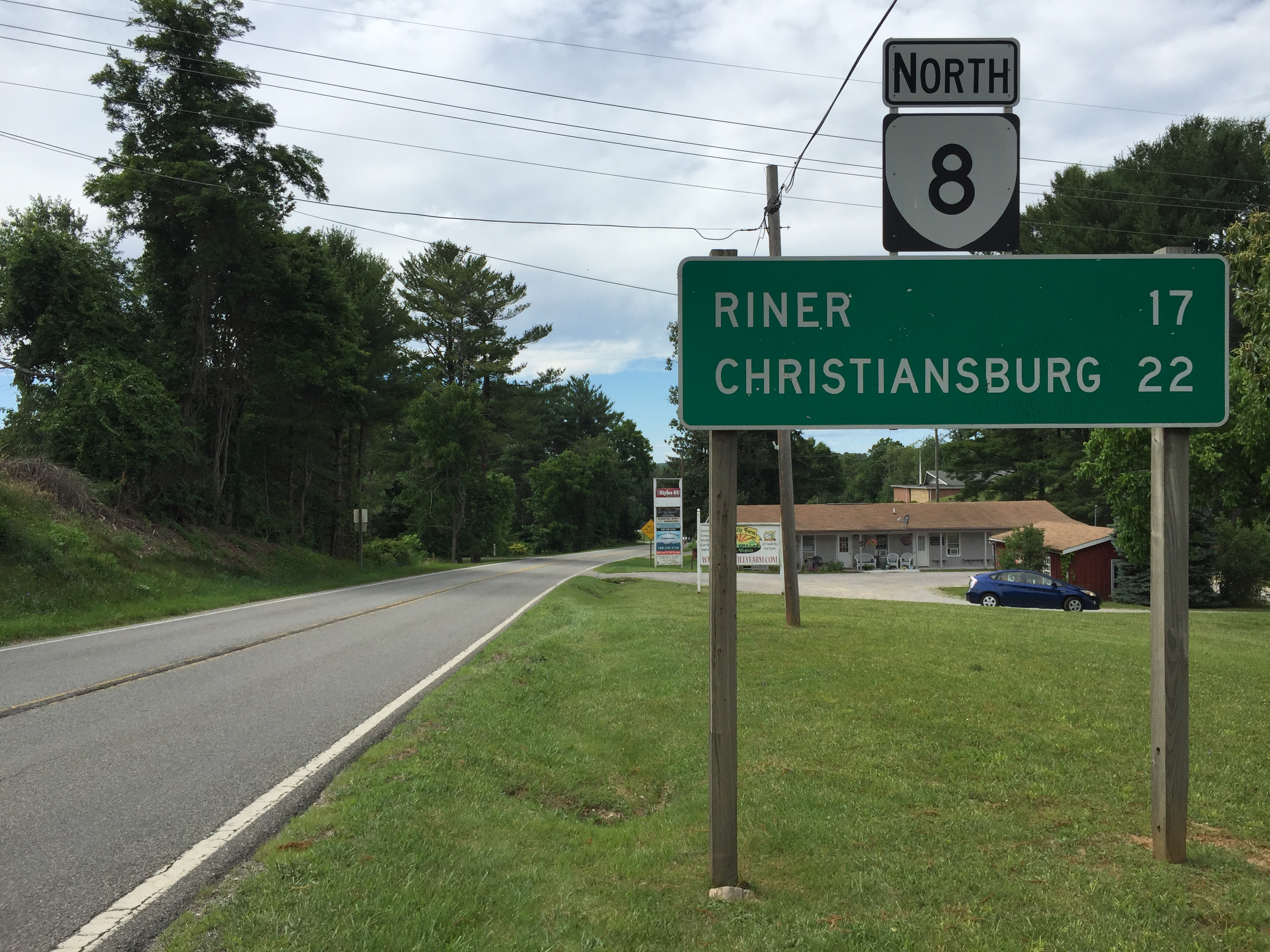
View north along SR 8 past SR 695 just north of Floyd

SR 8 begins at the North Carolina state line near Palmetto. The road continues south as NC 8, which passes through Lawsonville on its way to Winston-Salem. SR 8 heads northwest as Salem Highway, which meets the eastern end of SR 103 (Dry Pond Highway) in Five Forks. The state highway enters the town of Stuart by crossing the South Fork Mayo River. SR 8 follows South Main Street, first passing SR 8 Business, then Wood Brothers Drive. At Blue Ridge Street, the state highway turns west and joins US 58 Business on a concurrency west of the downtown area. Northwest of the town, SR 8 joins US 58 (Jeb Stuart Highway) north through a narrow creek valley to Cruzes Store.

SR 8 continues northeast as Woolwine Highway through narrow creek valleys to an intersection with SR 57 (Fairystone Park Highway) near Buffalo Ridge. The state highway crosses the Smith River shortly before meeting the west end of SR 40 (Charity Highway) in Woolwine. East of Rocky Knob, the namesake of an American Viticultural Area, SR 8 curvaceously ascends Blue Ridge Mountain to the Eastern Continental Divide at Tuggle Gap. At the gap, the state highway enters Floyd County and has an interchange with the Blue Ridge Parkway.

SR 8 continues north as Parkway Lane to the county seat of Floyd, where the highway follows Locust Street and intersects US 221 (Main Street). The state highway traverses the West Fork of the Little River and climbs over Wills Ridge south of the confluence of the rivers West and East forks. SR 8 crosses over the main stem of the river at the Montgomery county line, where the highway continues as Riner Road through the village of Riner in the Union Valley. The state highway enters the town of Christiansburg at its diamond interchange with Interstate 81. SR 8 follows Main Street to its northern terminus at US 11. US 11 heads west as Radford Street and north as Main Street to the center of the town.

== History ==
SR 8 was included in the initial 1918 state highway system as part of State Route 23, which continued north to West Virginia via present U.S. Route 460. In the 1933 renumbering, SR 23 was renumbered State Route 8 because the number was used by U.S. Route 23. The short piece west from Rich Creek to West Virginia became part of U.S. Route 219 by 1937, and U.S. Route 460 replaced the entire route north of Christiansburg by 1947.

== Major intersections ==
County	Location	mi	km	Destinations	Notes
Patrick		0.00	0.00	NC 8 south – Winston-Salem	North Carolina state line; southern terminus
Patrick		5.08	8.18	SR 103 south (Dry Pond Highway) – Mt. Airy, NC, J.E.B. Stuart Birthplace	
Patrick	Stuart	8.50	13.68	SR 8 Bus. north (Patrick Avenue)	Southern terminus of SR 8 Bus.
Patrick	Stuart			US 58 Bus. east / SR 8 Bus. south (East Blue Ridge Street) / Wood Brothers Drive	South end of concurrency with US 58 Bus.; northern terminus of SR 8 Bus.
Patrick	Stuart	10.76	17.32	US 58 east (J.E.B. Stuart Highway) – Martinsville	North end of concurrency with US 58 Bus.; south end of concurrency with US 58
Patrick	Cruzes Store	12.77	20.55	US 58 west (J.E.B. Stuart Highway) – Hillsville, Blue Ridge Parkway	North end of concurrency with US 58
Patrick		16.66	26.81	SR 57 east (Fairystone Park Highway) – Bassett, Martinsville, Fairy Stone Park, Philpott Dam	
Patrick	Woolwine	22.88	36.82	SR 40 east (Charity Highway) – Rocky Mount	Western terminus of SR 40
Floyd	Tuggle Gap	29.36	47.25	Blue Ridge Parkway / Tuggles Gap Road	Interchange
Floyd	Floyd	35.32	56.84	US 221 (Main Street) – Hillsville, Roanoke	
Montgomery	Christiansburg	55.11	88.69	I-81 – Bristol, Roanoke	Exit 114 (I-81)
Montgomery	Christiansburg	55.88	89.93	US 11 (Radford Street Northwest / West Main Street)	Northern terminus
1.000 mi = 1.609 km; 1.000 km = 0.621 mi: Concurrency terminus

== SR 8 Business ==
State Route 8 Business
- Location: Stuart
- Length: 1.0 mi (1.6 km)

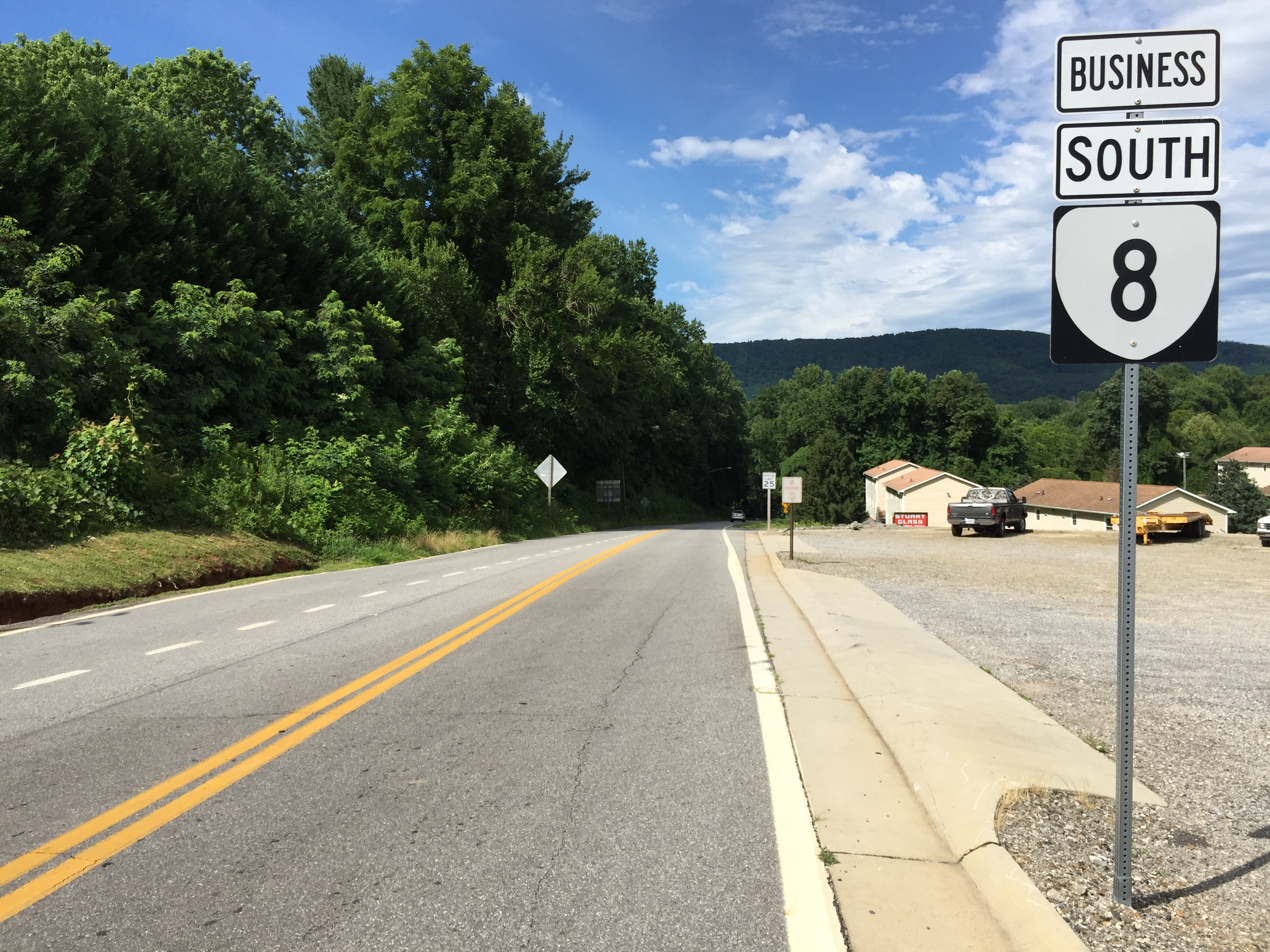
SR 8 Bus. at US 58 Bus. in Stuart

SR 8 Business (SR 8 Bus.) is a one-mile-long (1.6 km) special route of SR 8 in the town of Stuart. The route is a former alignment of SR 8 in downtown Stuart along Patrick Avenue and Blue Ridge Street (the latter of which is part of US 58 Bus.). The highway was designated after 2011 when a new alignment of SR 8 was constructed allowing the bypass of downtown Stuart especially by heavy truck traffic.

The route begins at a signalized intersection with Salem Highway (SR 8) in a small commercial area immediately north of the South Mayo River. SR 8 Bus. and Patrick Avenue, after first heading east, immediately heads north paralleling SR 8. After about 0.2 miles (0.32 km), the road travels uphill and curves towards the northeast. At the summit of the hill, SR 8 Bus. reaches Blue Ridge Street which carries US 58 Bus.; SR 8 Bus. turns northwest onto it and after a pair of 90-degree turns, enters the Stuart Uptown Historic District and passes the Patrick County Courthouse. SR 8 Bus. ends at an intersection with Wood Brothers Drive where SR 8 and US 58 Bus. continue together northwest.

< SR 22	Two‑digit State Routes; 1923-1933	SR 24 >
