= Russell Creek =

Russell Creek may refer to:

- Russell Creek (Georgia)
- Russell Creek (Ontario)
- Russell Creek, Virginia
