= VA8 =

VA-8 has the following meanings:

- State Route 8 (Virginia)
- Virginia's 8th congressional district
- A Subaru WRX STI S207 NBR Challenge Package
