= Charles P. Nolen =

American politician

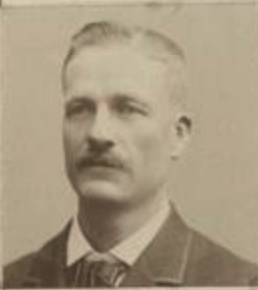

Member of the Virginia House of Delegates from Patrick County
- In office December 2, 1891 – December 6, 1893

Personal details
- Born: Charles Patterson Nolen Jr. October 26, 1849 Patrick, Virginia, U.S.
- Died: December 9, 1919 (aged 70) Patrick, Virginia, U.S.
- Party: Democratic
- Spouse: Juda Rakes

Charles Patterson Nolen Jr. (October 26, 1849 – December 9, 1919) was an American politician who served in the Virginia House of Delegates.
