= Reynolds Homestead =

Historic house in Virginia, United States

- U.S. National Register of Historic Places
- U.S. National Historic Landmark
- Virginia Landmarks Register
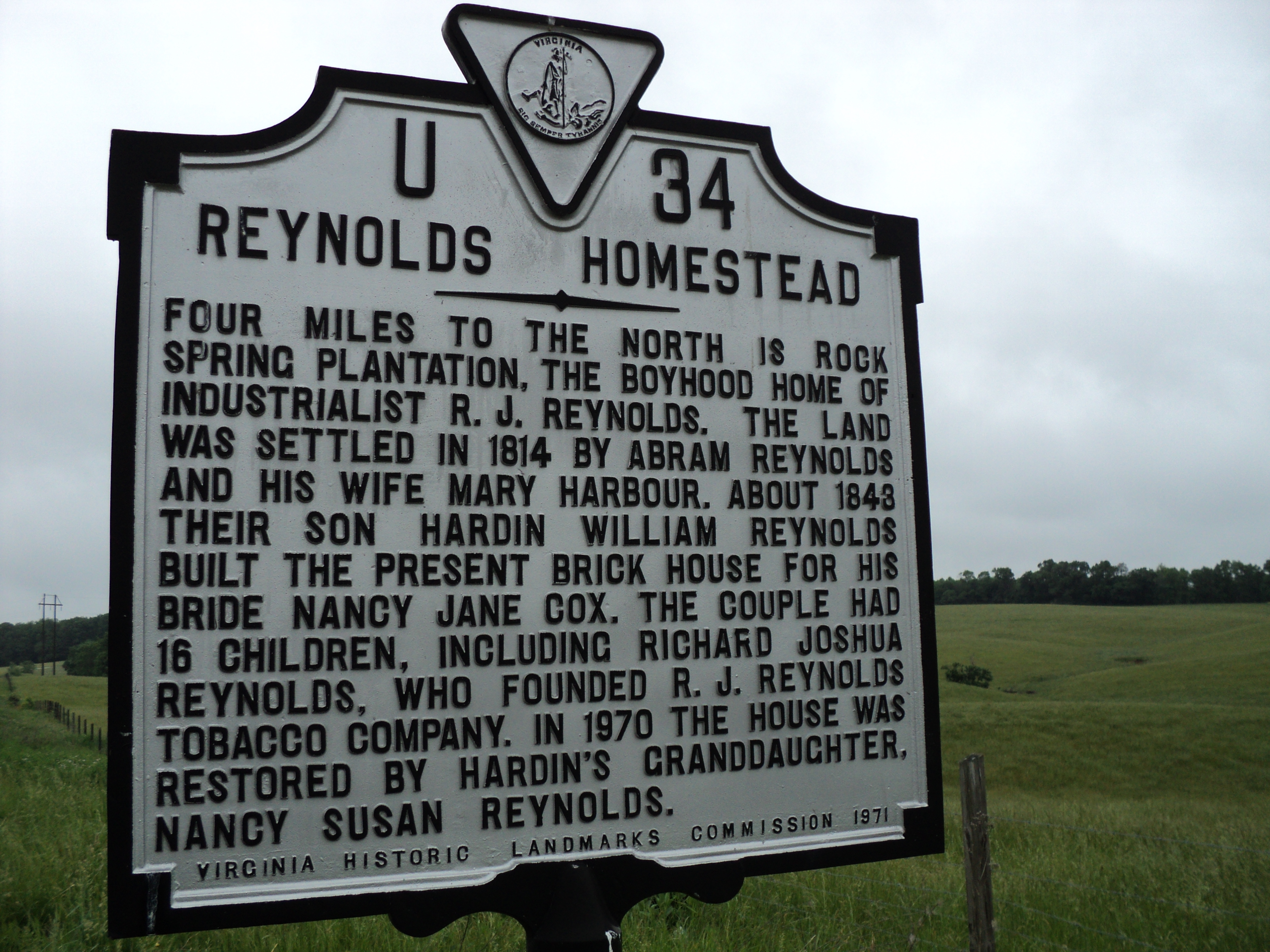
- Historic marker for Reynolds Homestead

- Location within Virginia Location within the United States
- Location: N of Critz on SR 798
- Coordinates: 36°38′39″N 80°8′55″W
- Area: 6.99 acres (2.83 ha)
- Built: 1850
- Architect: Reynolds, Hardin W.
- Architectural style: Greek Revival
- NRHP reference No.: 71000987
- VLR No.: 070-0005

Significant dates
- Added to NRHP: September 22, 1971
- Designated NHL: December 22, 1977
- Designated VLR: November 3, 1970

The Reynolds Homestead, also known as Rock Spring Plantation, is a historical site and former plantation worked by the enslaved, located on Homestead Lane in Critz, Virginia. First developed in 1814 by slaveowner Abram Reynolds, it was the primary home of R. J. Reynolds (1850–1918), founder of the R. J. Reynolds Tobacco Company, and the first major marketer of the cigarette. Upon liberation of the plantation in 1863, some 88 people were freed from captivity and enslavement.

It was later designated a National Historic Landmark in 1977. The homestead is now an outreach facility of Virginia Tech, serving as a regional cultural center. The house is open for tours.

== History ==
The Reynolds Homestead is located in a rural area of eastern Patrick County, Virginia, about one mile north of the village of Critz. The estate house is a two-story brick building with a hip roof, from which an older two-story ell extends. Outbuildings of the plantation complex include a large corn crib, a brick kitchen, milkhouse, and icehouse. The Reynolds family cemetery is located near the house and across a field is the slave cemetery. The house has been restored to its nineteenth century state and includes many of the original family furnishings.

The property was first developed by Abram Reynolds, who built a log cabin near where the main house stands. His son, Hardin W. Reynolds, developed the estate in the mid-19th century, and it here that his son, R. J. Reynolds was born and lived for the first 24 years of his life. Reynolds achieved early economic success selling plug tobacco, but made an instant success out of the introduction of the Camel cigarette brand, which he marketed and advertised widely.

Reynolds moved out of the family homestead in 1874. It remained within the family, but in declining condition, into the mid-20th century.

== Modern history ==
In 1968, Nancy Susan Reynolds, R.J.'s only surviving child, purchased over 700 acres (280 ha) of the original plantation, most of which she gave to Virginia Tech, retaining life interest in the homestead, which was carefully restored. The property is now managed by Virginia Tech, and includes a continuing education center managed by its Department of Outreach and International Affairs. It hosts educational and cultural events, and the house is open for tours for both individuals and groups.

== See also ==
- National Register of Historic Places listings in Patrick County, Virginia
- List of National Historic Landmarks in Virginia
