= Bob White Covered Bridge =

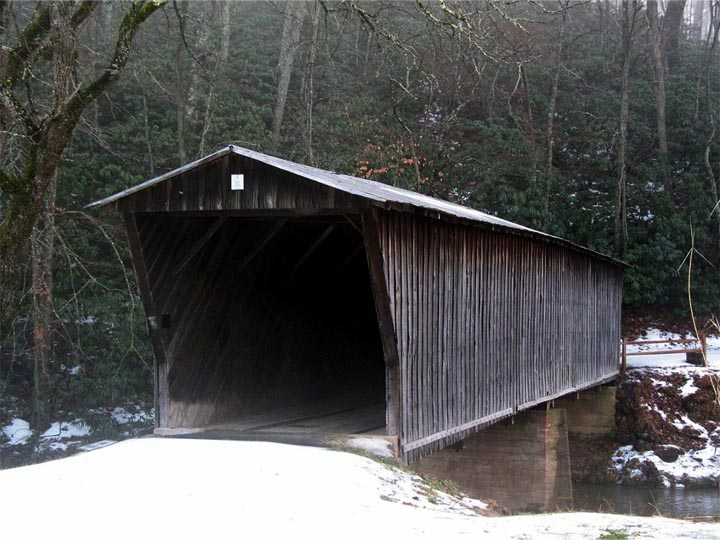
- The Bob White Covered Bridge near Woolwine, Virginia
- Coordinates: 36°46′44.82″N 80°14′51.26″W
- Carries: pedestrian traffic
- Crosses: Smith River
- Locale: Woolwine, Virginia
- Maintained by: Patrick County, VA
- ID number: 46-68-01 (WGCB)

Characteristics
- Design: Queen-post truss
- Total length: 80 ft (24 m)

History
- Constructed by: Walter Weaver
- Construction end: 1921
- Closed: September 29, 2015 by flooding
- Bob White Covered Bridge
- Formerly listed on the U.S. National Register of Historic Places
- Virginia Landmarks Register
- Area: 10 acres (4.0 ha)
- NRHP reference No.: 73002049
- VLR No.: 070-0027

Significant dates
- Added to NRHP: May 22, 1973
- Designated VLR: April 17, 1973
- Removed from NRHP: September 15, 2016
- Delisted VLR: June 15, 2017

Location
- Interactive map of Bob White Covered Bridge

The Bob White Covered Bridge, also known as the Lower Covered Bridge or Woolwine Covered Bridge, was a county-owned wooden covered bridge that spanned the Smith River in Patrick County, Virginia, United States. It was located on the old portion of Bob White Road (SR 869) off State Route 8 southeast of the community of Woolwine, about 13 miles (21 kilometers) north of Stuart. Coordinates were 36°46′44.82″N 80°14′51.26″W (36.779117, −80.247572).

Built in 1921, the 80-foot (24-meter) bridge was a Queen-post truss construction over two spans. Its WGCB number was 46-68-01. The Bob White Covered Bridge was listed on the National Register of Historic Places on May 22, 1973. It was one of two historic covered bridges remaining in Patrick County, maintained by the Patrick County government. The bridge washed away and was destroyed in major flooding on September 29, 2015, and subsequently removed from the National Register in 2017.

== History ==
The Bob White Covered Bridge was constructed by Walter G. Weaver of Woolwine, named for the former Bob White Post Office, which in turn was named after the bobwhite quails that inhabit the area. It served as an access route to the Smith River Church of the Brethren, located on the south side of the river. The bridge was bypassed to the west with a concrete bridge in 1981. Although closed to motor traffic, the Bob White Covered Bridge still attracted numerous visitors. The bridge was the site of annual horse-drawn wagon rides as part of the Patrick County Covered Bridge Festival held every June.

== See also ==
- List of bridges on the National Register of Historic Places in Virginia
- List of covered bridges in Virginia
