= Barnard Farm =

- U.S. National Register of Historic Places
- Virginia Landmarks Register
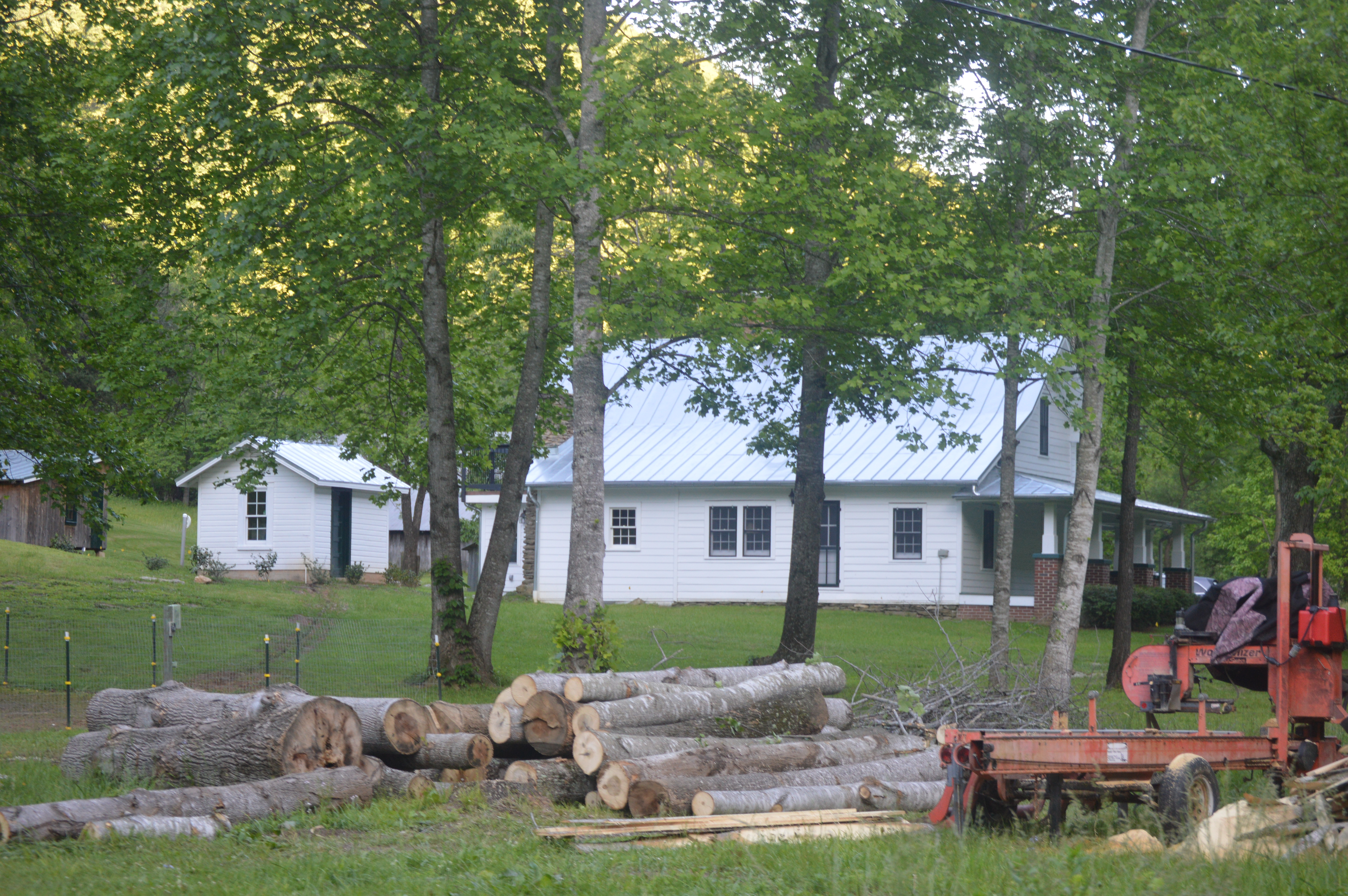
- Northern side of the house

- Location within Virginia Location within the United States
- Location: 2878 Kibler Valley Road, northwest of Ararat, Virginia
- Coordinates: 36°37′49″N 80°27′13″W
- Area: 155 acres (63 ha)
- Built: 1829
- Built by: Lucian Brim, William Barnard
- Architectural style: Greek Revival, Bungalow/craftsman
- NRHP reference No.: 09000338
- VLR No.: 070-5058

Significant dates
- Added to NRHP: May 21, 2009
- Designated VLR: March 19, 2009

Barnard Farm is a historic home and farm complex located near Ararat, Patrick County, Virginia, United States. The original section of the house dates to 1829, with expansions about 1851 and in the 1930s. It is a two-story, log and frame dwelling with interior Greek Revival style decorative detailing. The front facade features a one-story American Craftsman style porch. Also on the property are the contributing Barnard's Store (early 1950s), Kibler Post Office, garage (late 1910s), granary, spring house, cellar, chicken house, Barnard Cemetery, corn mill, barn and tobacco barn, outbuilding, pack house, and two tenant houses.

It was listed on the National Register of Historic Places in 2009.
