= Meems Bottom Covered Bridge =

- U.S. National Register of Historic Places
- Virginia Landmarks Register
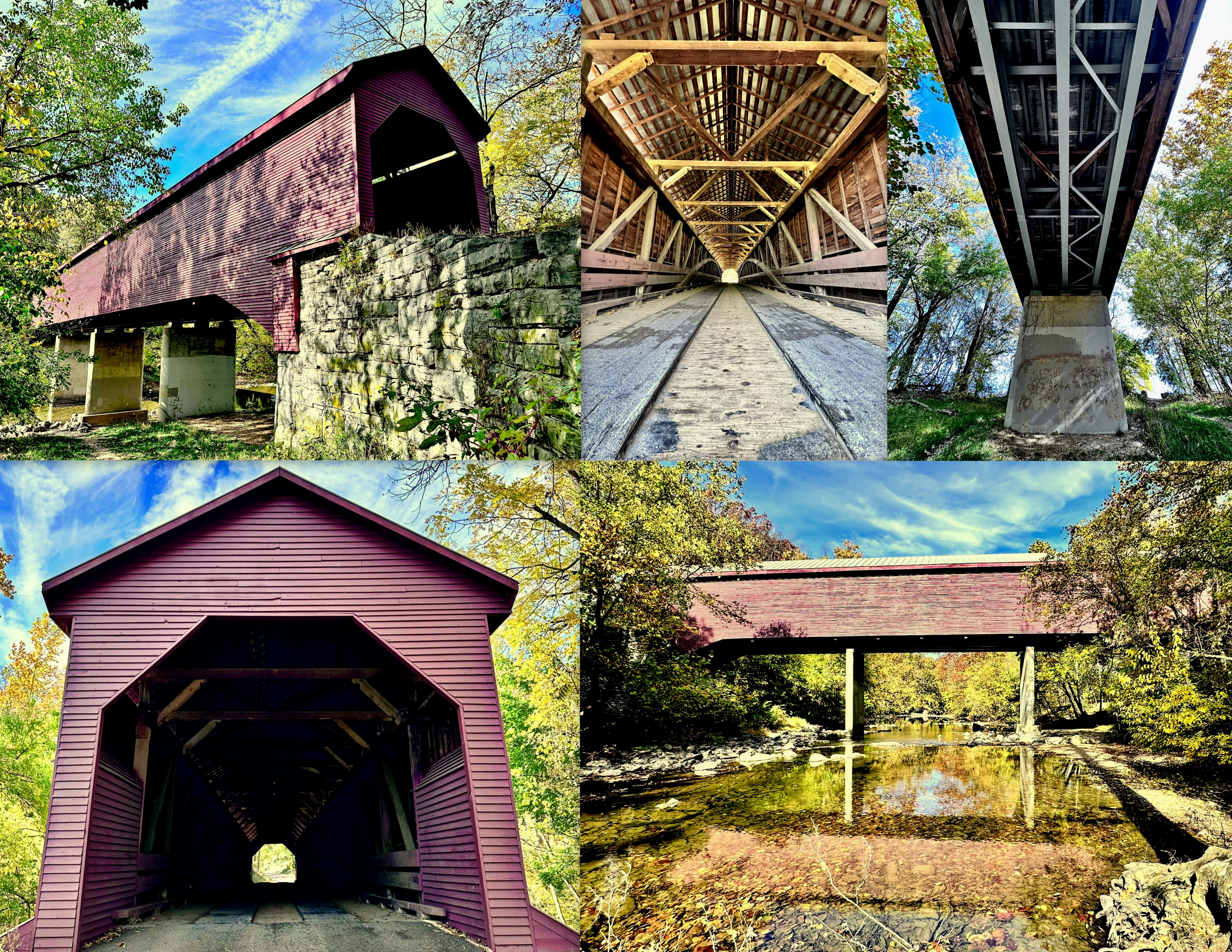
- Meems Bottom in 2023

- Location within Virginia Location within the United States
- Location: Route 720 over the North Fork of the Shenandoah River, Mount Jackson vicinity
- Coordinates: 38°43′14″N 78°39′20″W
- Built: 1894
- Architectural style: Burr Truss
- NRHP reference No.: 75002037
- VLR No.: 085-0103

Significant dates
- Added to NRHP: June 10, 1975 (original); April 23, 2008 (update)
- Designated VLR: April 15, 1975 (original); March 10, 2008 (update)

Meems Bottom Covered Bridge (also Meem's Bottom Covered Bridge) is in Shenandoah County, Virginia, United States. The bridge, at 204 feet (62 m), is the longest covered bridge in Virginia and one of the last that supports regular traffic. Near the town of Mount Jackson, the Meems Bottom Covered Bridge features a 200-foot single-span wooden Burr arch structure. Built in 1892 by Franklin Hiser Wissler, the wooden bridge over the North Fork of the Shenandoah River provided access to his apple orchards at Strathmore Farms. The bridge was listed on the National Register of Historic Places on June 10, 1975.

== History ==
It is believed that there were at least two prior bridges near Meem's Bottom that were lost by flood and fire. The first bridge was likely burned in 1862 by Stonewall Jackson's Rebels, and the second, washed away by floodwaters in 1870. There were likely also other bridges called Meems Bottom Bridge from Meem's bottomland, an alluvial plain formed by the North Fork of the Shenandoah, across the river to Mt. Jackson.

In a pre-dawn raid on October 3, 1864, Confederate Captain John McNeill led anywhere from 30 to 60 Confederate rangers (sources vary as to the number) against roughly 100 Union troopers of the 8th Ohio Cavalry Regiment guarding Meems Bottom, the bridge to Mt. Jackson, a strategic crossing on the Valley Turnpike. The attack lasted just fifteen minutes with most of the Union cavalry captured but McNeill, one of the best-known Confederate partisan raiders, was mortally wounded. He was taken to the house on Rude's Hill, where his identity was discovered by Union General Sheridan. He was then moved to Harrisonburg where he died.

The current Meems Bottom Covered Bridge is the fourth formally recorded bridge across the North Fork of the Shenandoah River at the location. The first bridge was constructed between 1867 and 1868, and was subsequently destroyed by a flood in March 1870. The bridge was replaced by 1871; however, this bridge was destroyed by floodwaters in November 1877. The third bridge was constructed in 1878 and was replaced by the current structure in 1894. Another, earlier bridge at a nearby location was destroyed by General Stonewall Jackson's troops in 1862 during the American Civil War.

The name of the bridge derives from the locally prominent Meem family, which held large tracts of land in the area. The timbers that were used to build the bridge of 1894 were cut from Confederate General Gilbert S. Meem's former farm, Strathmoor, located nearby. The farm was bought by F. H. Whisler in 1891; he contracted John Woods to construct the 1894 bridge. Some 57,000 feet (17,000 m) of timber were cut locally by J. L. Olinger.

The current bridge is of the Burr Truss design, which was patented by Theodore Burr, brother of U.S. Vice President Aaron Burr, in 1817. The bridge spans a length of 204 feet (62 m) across the river, making the bridge the longest still-standing covered bridge in Virginia. Two stone abutments, which extend ten feet below the riverbed, support the bridge on the sides of the river. The rock used in the abutments was gathered from local quarries. The bridge consists of two arches on each side spanning the length of the bridge and joining the abutments 8 feet (2.4 m) below the top of the abutments' stone construction. The arches are constructed of three sections each of 7-inch (18 cm) by 15-inch (38 cm) timbers bolted together. The vertical truss supports and horizontal roof supports are composed of 8-inch (20 cm) by 10-inch (25 cm) lumber. The diagonal truss supports are 7-inch (18 cm) by 9-inch (23 cm) timbers. Originally, the floor supports consisted of two 7-inch (18 cm) by 12-inch (30 cm) beams along the length of the bridge and 4-inch (10 cm) by 14-inch (36 cm) beams supporting the roadway running from side to side. The bridge was strengthened in 1937 with the addition of steel I-beams running along the length of the bridge and parallel to the roadway supports. A new road surface was also added at this time.

The bridge continued to serve traffic until it was destroyed by fire when vandals burned the bridge on October 31, 1976. The original timbers of the bridge were salvaged, however, and the bridge was reconstructed and put back into service by September 1979. The restoration included new concrete piers and steel beams.

Meems Bottom Covered Bridge was added to the National Register of Historic Places on June 10, 1975. An updated listing was added on April 23, 2008. The bridge is also on the Virginia Landmarks Register and was listed on April 15, 1975. The updated listing was added March 10, 2008.

== See also ==
- List of bridges on the National Register of Historic Places in Virginia
- List of covered bridges in Virginia
- National Register of Historic Places listings in Shenandoah County, Virginia
