= Patrick Springs, Virginia =

- CDP
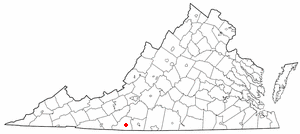
- Location of Patrick Springs, Virginia
- Coordinates: 36°38′10″N 80°12′13″W
- Country: United States
- State: Virginia
- County: Patrick

Area
  - Total: 15.7 sq mi (40.6 km^{2})
  - Land: 15.7 sq mi (40.6 km^{2})
  - Water: 0 sq mi (0.0 km^{2})
- Elevation: 1,250 ft (381 m)

Population (2010)
  - Total: 1,845
  - Density: 118/sq mi (45.4/km^{2})
- Time zone: UTC−5 (Eastern (EST))
  - Summer (DST): UTC−4 (EDT)
- ZIP code: 24133
- Area code: 276
- FIPS code: 51-60984
- GNIS feature ID: 1497076

Patrick Springs is a census-designated place (CDP) in Patrick County, Virginia, United States. As of the 2020 census, Patrick Springs had a population of 1,813.

== History ==
In 1857, the area's first post office was operated as Spabrook Station in the vicinity of the old Patrick Springs hotel and mineral resort. Spabrooke Station was named Patrick Springs post office in 1859. A second post office was operated on Route 680 just north of old Route 58 and was called Shuff post office.

Shuff was the phonetic spelling of "Shough", the surname of Reverend Jacob Shough, a highly respected Methodist circuit rider and one of the early founders of the Patrick Springs area. In 1894, the residents named the community and post office "Shuff" in his honor. Reverend Shough ran a store and post office combination as well as building the old Shough grist mill, one of the community's oldest landmarks. The old Shough mill was operated by four generations of the Shough family, before it stopping operating in 1918.

The Patrick Springs post office was discontinued in 1875, then re-opened in 1907. During the 32 years the Patrick Springs was closed, Shuff Post Office handled all the mail for the area. Passengers of the Danville and Western Railway "Dick & Willie" would pass by the Shuff depot and post office on their way to the old Patrick Springs hotel and mineral resort. Having two sets of local addresses caused confusion, and in 1925, legislative steps were taken to give the whole area, post office, and train depot the name "Patrick Springs".

== Geography ==
Patrick Springs is located at 36°38′10″N 80°12′13″W (36.636201, −80.203654).

According to the United States Census Bureau, the CDP has a total area of 15.7 square miles (40.6 km^{2}), all land.

== Demographics ==
Historical population
Census	Pop.	Note	%±
2000	2,068		—
2020	1,813		—
U.S. Decennial Census; 2000 2010 2020

Patrick Springs was first listed as a census designated place in the 2000 U.S. census.

=== 2020 census ===
As of the 2020 census, Patrick Springs had a population of 1,813. The median age was 49.7 years. 17.8% of residents were under the age of 18 and 28.5% of residents were 65 years of age or older. For every 100 females there were 98.6 males, and for every 100 females age 18 and over there were 97.1 males age 18 and over.

0.0% of residents lived in urban areas, while 100.0% lived in rural areas.

There were 812 households in Patrick Springs, of which 23.0% had children under the age of 18 living in them. Of all households, 48.2% were married-couple households, 18.3% were households with a male householder and no spouse or partner present, and 26.8% were households with a female householder and no spouse or partner present. About 29.0% of all households were made up of individuals and 16.1% had someone living alone who was 65 years of age or older.

There were 924 housing units, of which 12.1% were vacant. The homeowner vacancy rate was 1.1% and the rental vacancy rate was 4.1%.

Racial composition as of the 2020 census
Race	Number	Percent
White	1,559	86.0%
Black or African American	116	6.4%
American Indian and Alaska Native	7	0.4%
Asian	1	0.1%
Native Hawaiian and Other Pacific Islander	0	0.0%
Some other race	45	2.5%
Two or more races	85	4.7%
Hispanic or Latino (of any race)	81	4.5%

=== 2000 census ===
As of the census of 2000, there were 2,068 people, 872 households, and 622 families residing in the CDP. The population density was 131.9 people per square mile (50.9/km^{2}). There were 966 housing units at an average density of 61.6/sq mi (23.8/km^{2}). The racial makeup of the CDP was 91.15% White, 6.82% African American, 0.34% Native American, 0.68% from other races, and 1.02% from two or more races. Hispanic or Latino of any race were 1.84% of the population.

There were 872 households, out of which 30.4% had children under the age of 18 living with them, 56.0% were married couples living together, 11.5% had a female householder with no husband present, and 28.6% were non-families. 25.3% of all households were made up of individuals, and 11.5% had someone living alone who was 65 years of age or older. The average household size was 2.37 and the average family size was 2.83.

In the CDP, the population was spread out, with 23.5% under the age of 18, 6.8% from 18 to 24, 27.4% from 25 to 44, 27.6% from 45 to 64, and 14.7% who were 65 years of age or older. The median age was 40 years. For every 100 females, there were 93.5 males. For every 100 females age 18 and over, there were 91.1 males.

The median income for a household in the CDP was $35,028, and the median income for a family was $41,222. Males had a median income of $25,404 versus $21,218 for females. The per capita income for the CDP was $16,915. About 10.7% of families and 14.4% of the population were below the poverty line, including 20.2% of those under age 18 and 24.4% of those age 65 or over.

== Climate ==
The climate in this area is characterized by hot, humid summers and generally mild to cool winters. According to the Köppen Climate Classification system, Patrick Springs has a humid subtropical climate, abbreviated "Cfa" on climate maps.
