= Woolwine, Virginia =

Unincorporated community in Virginia, United States

Woolwine
- Unincorporated community
- Location within the Commonwealth of Virginia Woolwine (the United States)
- Coordinates: 36°47′23″N 80°16′39″W
- Country: United States
- State: Virginia
- County: Patrick

Area
  - Total: 170 sq mi (430 km^{2})
- Time zone: UTC−5 (Eastern (EST))
  - Summer (DST): UTC−4 (EDT)
- ZIP codes: 24185
- GNIS feature ID: 1500355

Woolwine is an unincorporated community in northern Patrick County, Virginia, United States. The western terminus of State Route 40 is here, at State Route 8. The community lies in the Rocky Knob American Viticultural Area. Two covered bridges are located in Woolwine: the Jack's Creek Covered Bridge (built 1914) and the more recent Clifford Wood Covered Bridge (built 1977) which is privately owned. They span the Smith River. The Bob White Covered Bridge (built 1921), which also spanned the Smith River, was destroyed during flooding on September 29, 2015.

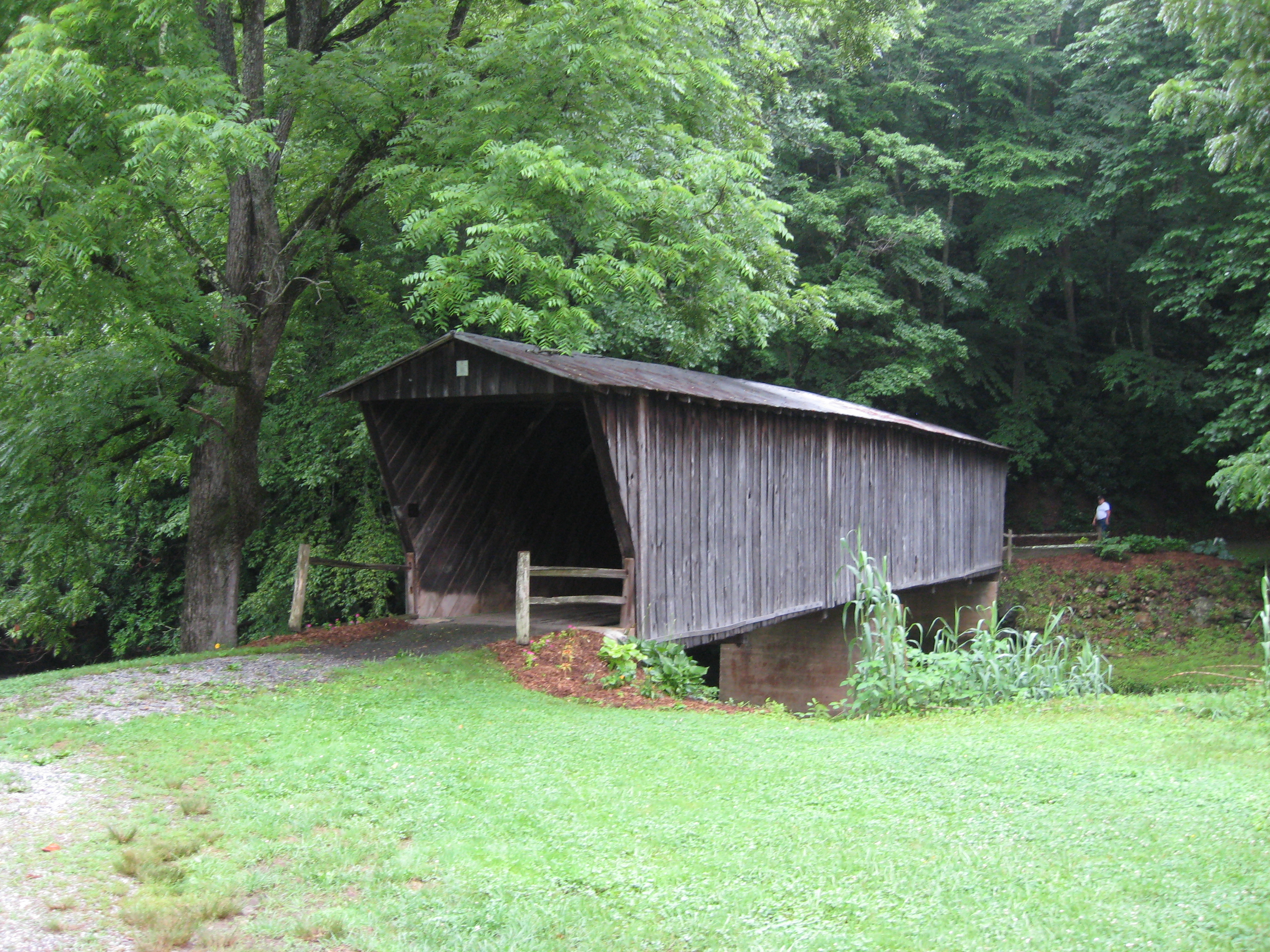
The Bob White Covered Bridge destroyed by a flood in 2015.

Woolwine has an elevation of 430 metres (1,410 ft). The community sits at the foot of the Blue Ridge Mountains. The Blue Ridge Parkway is 10 kilometres (6.2 miles) northwest of Woolwine following State Route 8.

Baseball player Herb Hash was born in Woolwine.

== Climate ==
The climate in this area is characterized by hot, humid summers and generally mild to cool winters. According to the Köppen Climate Classification system, Woolwine has a humid subtropical climate, abbreviated "Cfa" on climate maps.
