= Russell Creek (Georgia) =

- Location within Georgia Location within the United States

Physical characteristics
- Source
  - coordinates: 34.4358333°N 84.0863889°W
- Mouth
  - coordinates: 34.3945401°N 84.0454661°W

Russell Creek is a stream in the U.S. state of Georgia. It is a tributary to the Etowah River.

Russell Creek took its name from Russell's Mill, a watermill on its banks. A variant name is "Russells Creek".
