= Philpott Dam =

Coordinates: 36°46′52″N 80°01′39″W

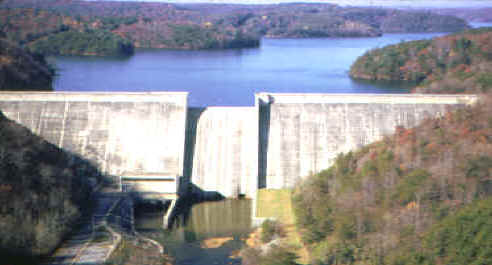
Photo by the US Army Corps of Engineers depicting Philpott Dam and powerhouse. Philpott Lake and the Blue Ridge Mountains can be seen in the background.

Philpott Dam is a concrete, gravity dam on the Smith River in Franklin and Henry counties in the U.S. state of Virginia. It impounds Philpott Lake.

Philpott Dam is located about 44 miles (71 km) above the mouth of the Smith River. It is about 7 miles (11 km) upstream from Bassett, Virginia.

The Dam and Philpott Lake were created to control flooding along the Smith River, to generate hydroelectric power, and to provide recreational activities in a series of parks around the lake: Philpott Park, Bowens Creek Park, Goose Point Park, Ryans Park, Jamison Mill Park, Horseshoe Point Park, Twin Ridge Park, Salthouse Branch Park, and Tailrace Park (listed clockwise around the lake beginning at the south end of the dam). Construction on Philpott Dam began in 1948 and was completed in 1952. The Philpott Dam Powerhouse was completed and started generating electricity in 1953. The Philpott project is operated by the U.S. Army Corps of Engineers, Wilmington District.

The dam includes a spillway, a powerhouse, and switchyard. The top elevation of Philpott Dam is 1016 feet (310 m) msl and has an overall length of 920 feet (280 m). The maximum height above the streambed is 220 feet (67 m). The spillway has a crest elevation of 985 feet, msl and a total length of 120 feet (37 m)

The power house has two vertical shaft Francis turbines rated at 6700 kW each and a smaller unit rated at 600 kW.

Electricity from the dam is marketed by the Southeastern Power Administration.

The dam is also a noted tourist and recreational area, and a place of great beauty. Over the years, a number of artists and photographers have used the dam site for their compositions. Jessamine Shumate, a local artist, did an early watercolor painting of the Philpott Dam in Henry County, and a second, unfinished painting. These two paintings were done during the construction phase of the dam, and both paintings show the temporary cement factory that was constructed to produce the cement locally. The cement mill was then taken down and removed after the dam was constructed. Her paintings are the only representations from this phase of construction, since most other photographic work concentrated on the construction of the dam itself, and not in the engineering aspects of the construction site. These paintings have recently (2010) been donated to the Philpott Dam. "Relatives of the late artist Ada Jessamine Shumate, who contributed two of her paintings of the construction of Philpott Dam to the dam’s visitor’s center. Jessamine Shumate was a native of Henry County, Virginia, who painted the construction during the 1950s. Sharing the paintings with the public is a fitting tribute to her work and a good way for people to get a sense of what went into creating the dam."
