= Russell Creek, Virginia =

Unincorporated community in Virginia, US

Coordinates: 36°33′58″N 80°12′33″W

Russell Creek is an unincorporated community located in southeastern Patrick County, Virginia, United States that encompasses a large portion of the county's population. The community is mainly rural residential, with the community center serving as the voting precinct location.
