= Stuart Uptown Historic District =

Historic district in Virginia, United States

- U.S. National Register of Historic Places
- U.S. Historic district
- Virginia Landmarks Register
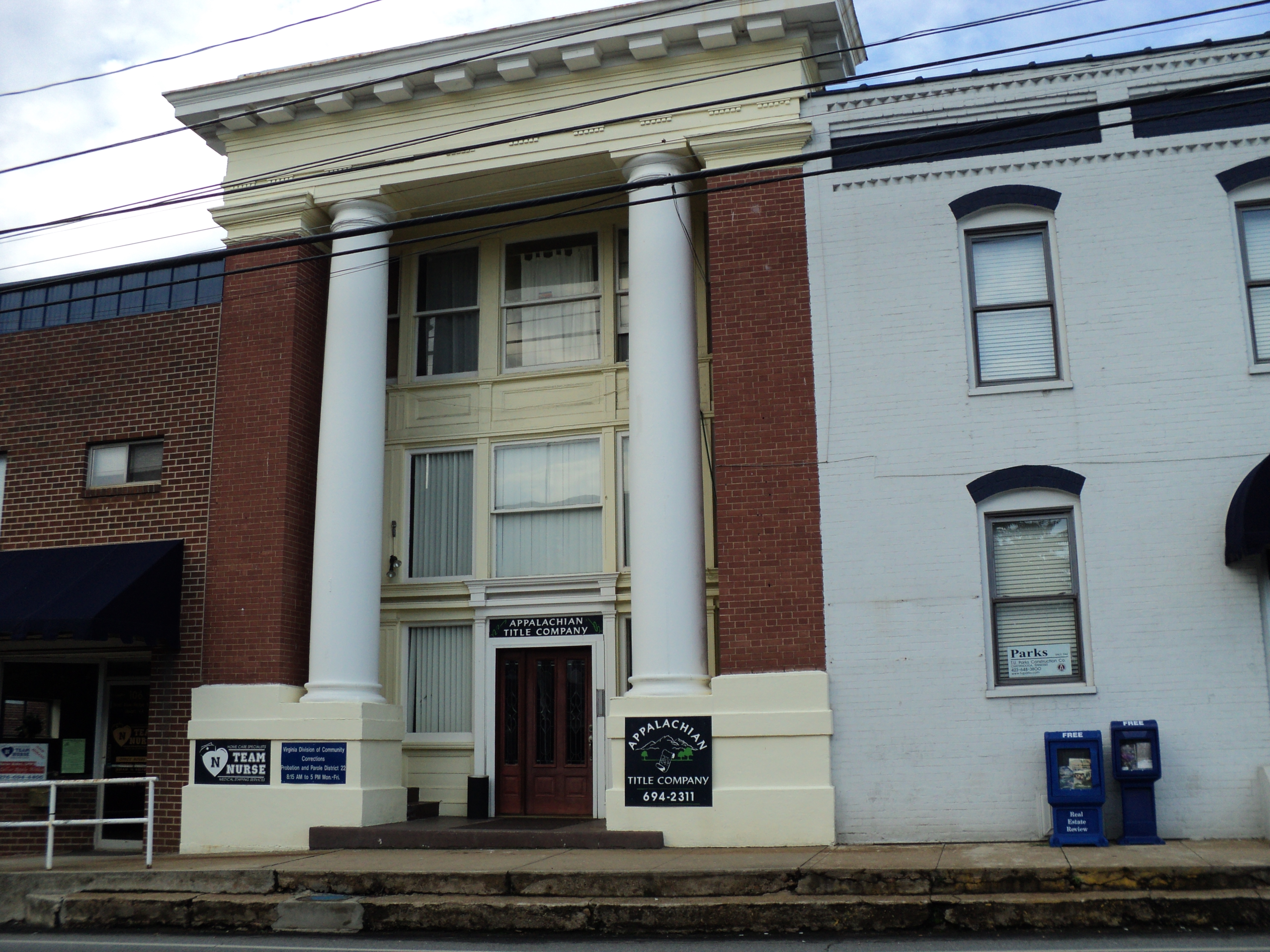
- Buildings in the Stuart Uptown Historic District, May 2010

- Location within Virginia Location within the United States
- Location: Main St. and Blue Ridge St., Stuart, Virginia
- Coordinates: 36°38′29″N 80°16′12″W
- Area: 6 acres (2.4 ha)
- Built: 1858
- Architect: Thomas, C.Y.
- Architectural style: Classical Revival, Gothic Revival, et al.
- NRHP reference No.: 01001512
- VLR No.: 307-5004

Significant dates
- Added to NRHP: January 24, 2002
- Designated VLR: September 17, 1974

Stuart Uptown Historic District is a national historic district located at Stuart, Patrick County, Virginia. The district includes 18 contributing buildings and 1 contributing object in the central business district of the town of Stuart. The district includes a variety of commercial and governmental buildings including the Stuart Post Office constructed by the Public Works Administration in 1940, the Patrick County Bank (1911), Bank of Stuart (1896), Stuart United Methodist Church and the Stuart Baptist Church. The district includes one and two-story brick commercial buildings dating from the early to mid 20th century including the Stuart Drug Store (1938) and the Hudson's Drug Store (1941). Located in the district and separately listed is the Patrick County Courthouse.

It was listed on the National Register of Historic Places in 2002.
