= Herb Hash =

American baseball player (1911–2008)

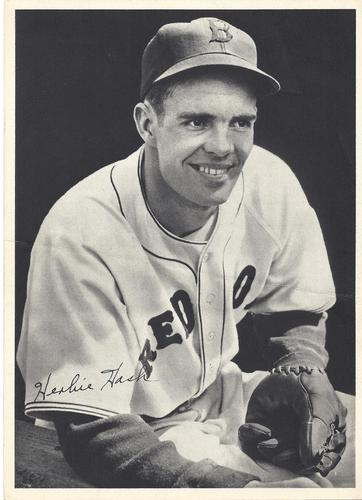
- Pitcher
- Born: February 13, 1911; Woolwine, Virginia, U.S.
- Died: May 20, 2008 (aged 97); Culpeper, Virginia, U.S.
- Batted: Right Threw: Right

MLB debut
- April 19, 1940, for the Boston Red Sox

Last MLB appearance
- April 30, 1941, for the Boston Red Sox

MLB statistics
- Win–loss record: 8–7
- Earned run average: 4.98
- Strikeouts: 39
- Stats at Baseball Reference

Teams
- Boston Red Sox (1940–41)

Herbert Howard Hash (February 13, 1911 – May 20, 2008) was an American right-handed pitcher in Major League Baseball who played from 1940 to 1941 for the Boston Red Sox. He was born in Woolwine, Virginia.

== Early life ==
Hash was born near the location of the present-day Woolwine Elementary School. He attended the University of Richmond and is a member of the university's Hall of Fame.

== Professional baseball career ==
Hash made his debut for the Red Sox on April 19, 1940. Hash was used extensively during the 1940 season, making his first start on May 26 at Fenway Park. He was knocked out of the game in the sixth inning but came back four days later to pitch the first complete game of his career at Yankee Stadium before a capacity crowd of 82,437. It was customary to play doubleheaders in this era on Memorial Day, and he started the second game of the twin bill. He scattered six hits in an 11–4 victory. He pitched his first career shutout on June 23 at Municipal Stadium against the Cleveland Indians as the Red Sox won 2–0. The 1941 season proved to be his last stint in the major leagues, with his final appearance occurring on April 30, 1941.

A string of injuries and illnesses cut short what looked to be a very promising baseball career, as Hash had a very serious back injury which required a spinal fusion and 145 stitches in his back. He continued to pitch in the minor leagues, with his latest documented minor league stint coming in 1946.

His lifetime major league stats are 38 games with a record of 8–7, a 4.98 earned run average, 3 complete games, 1 shutout and 4 saves in 128 1/3 innings pitched, with a lifetime batting average of .167.

== Personal life ==
Hash also served in the educational field during his baseball career. After his baseball career ended, he served as a teacher or principal for thirty three years.

== Death and legacy ==
Herb Hash died of a stroke on May 20, 2008, in Culpeper, Virginia, with his death announced by Red Sox commentators Jerry Remy and Don Orsillo during play versus the Kansas City Royals. At the time of his death, at the age of 97, Hash had been recognized as the fourth-oldest living former major league ballplayer, and the second oldest former Red Sox player.
