= Critz, Virginia =

Unincorporated community in Virginia, United States

- Unincorporated community
- Location within Virginia Location within the United States
- Coordinates: 36°37′48″N 80°08′41″W
- Country: United States
- State: Virginia
- County: Patrick
- Elevation: 1,152 ft (351 m)
- Time zone: UTC-5 (Eastern (EST))
  - Summer (DST): UTC-4 (EDT)
- ZIP code: 24082
- Area code: 276
- GNIS feature ID: 1465440

Critz is an unincorporated community in Patrick County, Virginia, United States. Critz is 6.7 miles (10.8 km) east of Stuart. Critz has a post office with ZIP code 24082. Hardin Reynolds Memorial School and the Reynolds Homestead are located in Critz.
