= Sinking Creek (New River tributary) =

Coordinates: 37°18′18.45″N 80°37′16.23″W

Location
- Country: United States

Physical characteristics
- Source
  - location: Virginia
- Basin size: New River

Sinking Creek is a river in the United States state of Virginia. Due to the karst topography northwest of Blacksburg, the river disappears underground and then re-emerges from springs as it flows into the New River.

== See also ==
- List of rivers of Virginia
