= Patrick County Courthouse =

Historic courthouse in Virginia, US

- U.S. National Register of Historic Places
- U.S. Historic district – Contributing property
- Virginia Landmarks Register
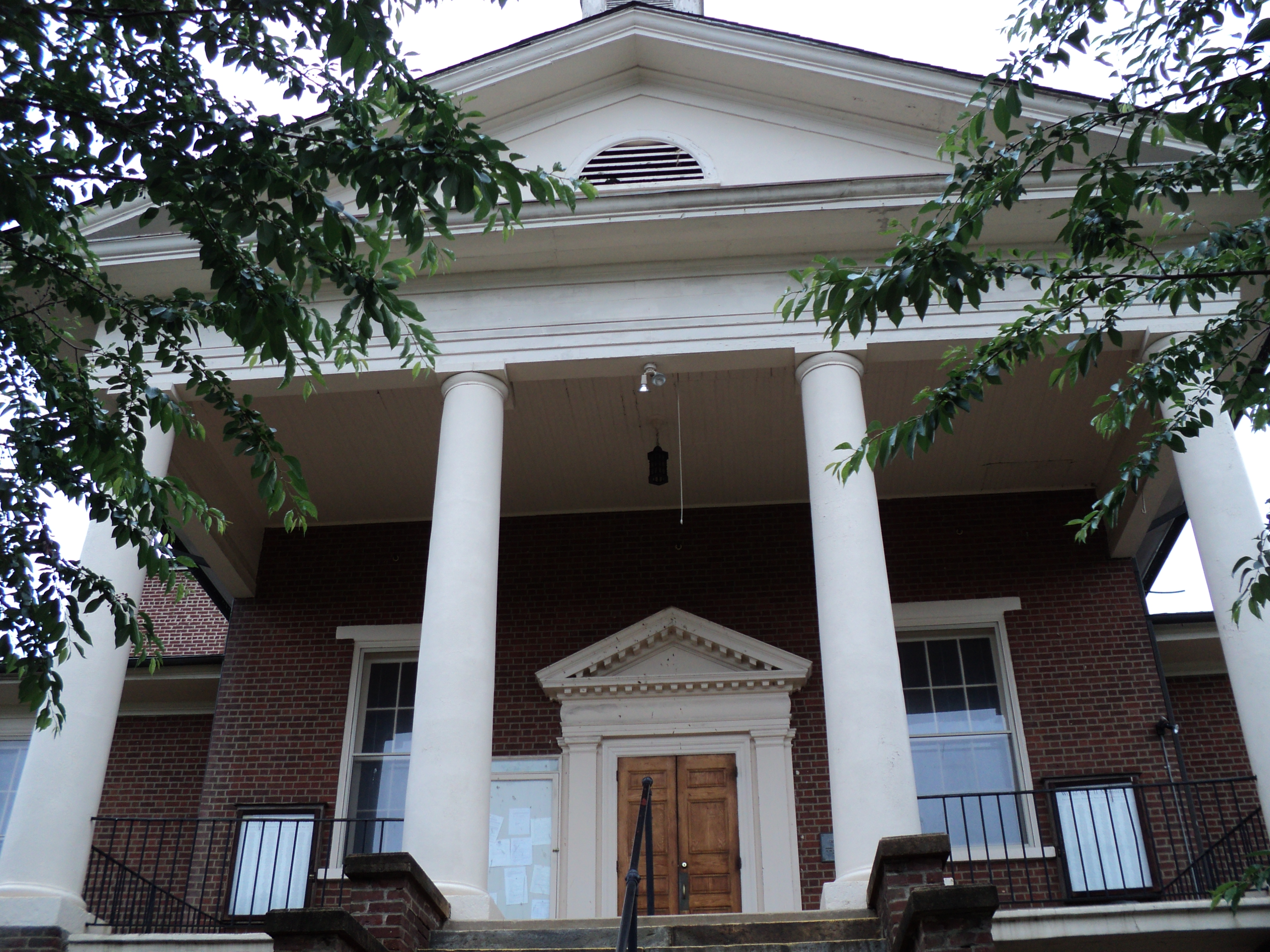
- Patrick County Courthouse, May 2010

- Location within Virginia Location within the United States
- Interactive map showing the location of Patrick County Courthouse
- Location: SE corner of Main and Blue Ridge Sts., Stuart, Virginia
- Coordinates: 36°38′29″N 80°16′13″W
- Area: 9 acres (3.6 ha)
- Built: 1822
- Architect: Staples, Abram
- Architectural style: Jeffersonian Neo-Classicism
- NRHP reference No.: 74002142
- VLR No.: 307-0001

Significant dates
- Added to NRHP: December 27, 1974
- Designated VLR: September 17, 1974

Patrick County Courthouse is a historic courthouse building located at Stuart, Patrick County, Virginia. It was built in 1822, and is a two-story, brick building consisting of a projecting, three-bay central block with flanking wings in the Jeffersonian Roman Revival style. The front facade features a pedimented portico supported by four Tuscan order columns. It is topped by a small bell tower. The building was remodeled in 1928, and refurbished in 1936 and 1971.

It was listed on the National Register of Historic Places in 1974. It is a contributing property in the Stuart Uptown Historic District.
