= Fairy Stone State Park =

State park in Virginia, USA

- IUCN category V (protected landscape/seascape)
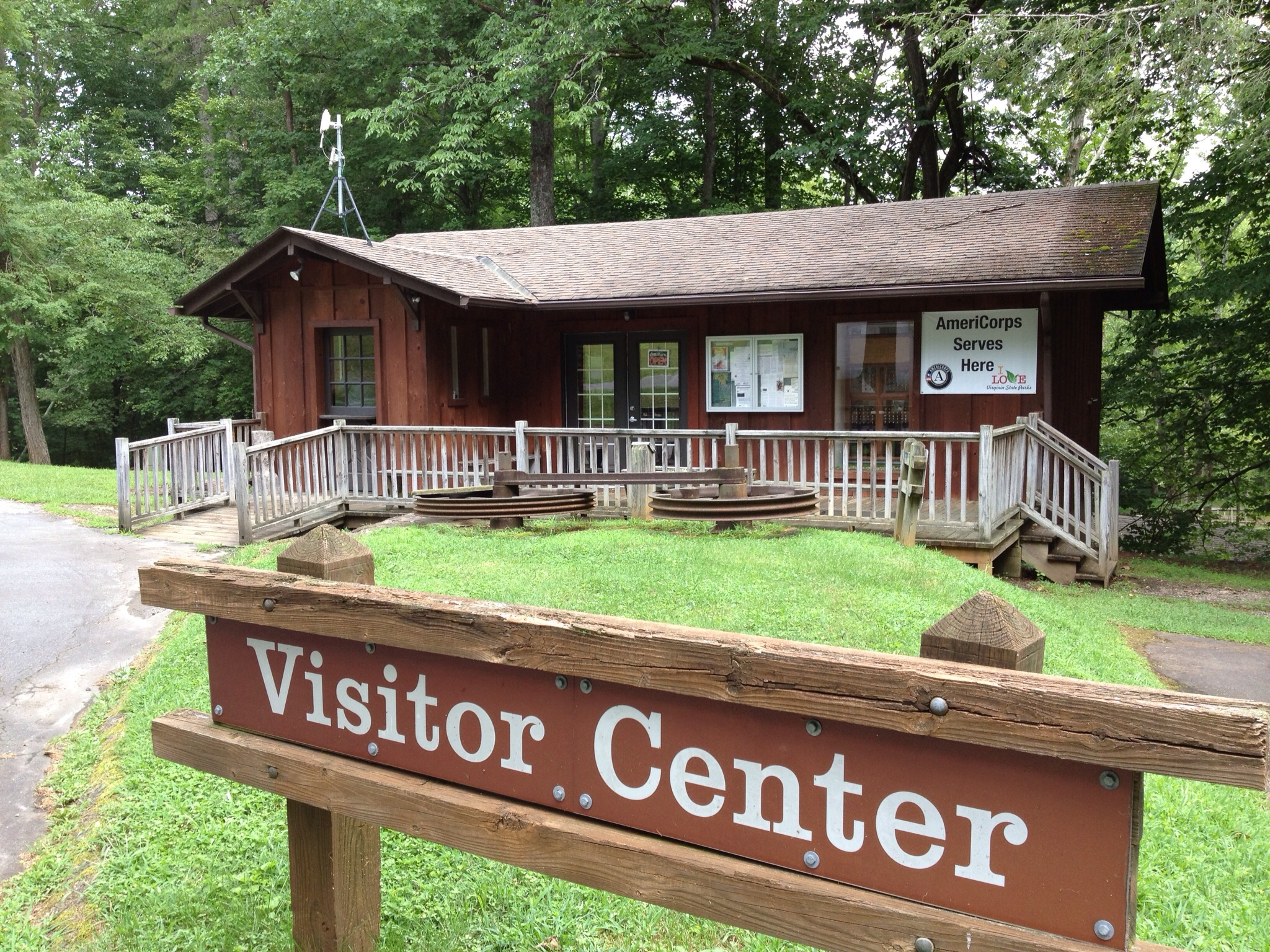
- The park's visitor center

- Location within Virginia Location within the United States
- Location: Patrick County, Virginia, USA
- Coordinates: 36°47′5″N 80°5′46″W
- Area: 4,741 acres (1,919 ha)
- Established: 1936
- Governing body: Virginia Department of Conservation and Recreation
- Fairy Stone State Park Historic District
- U.S. National Register of Historic Places
- U.S. Historic district
- Virginia Landmarks Register
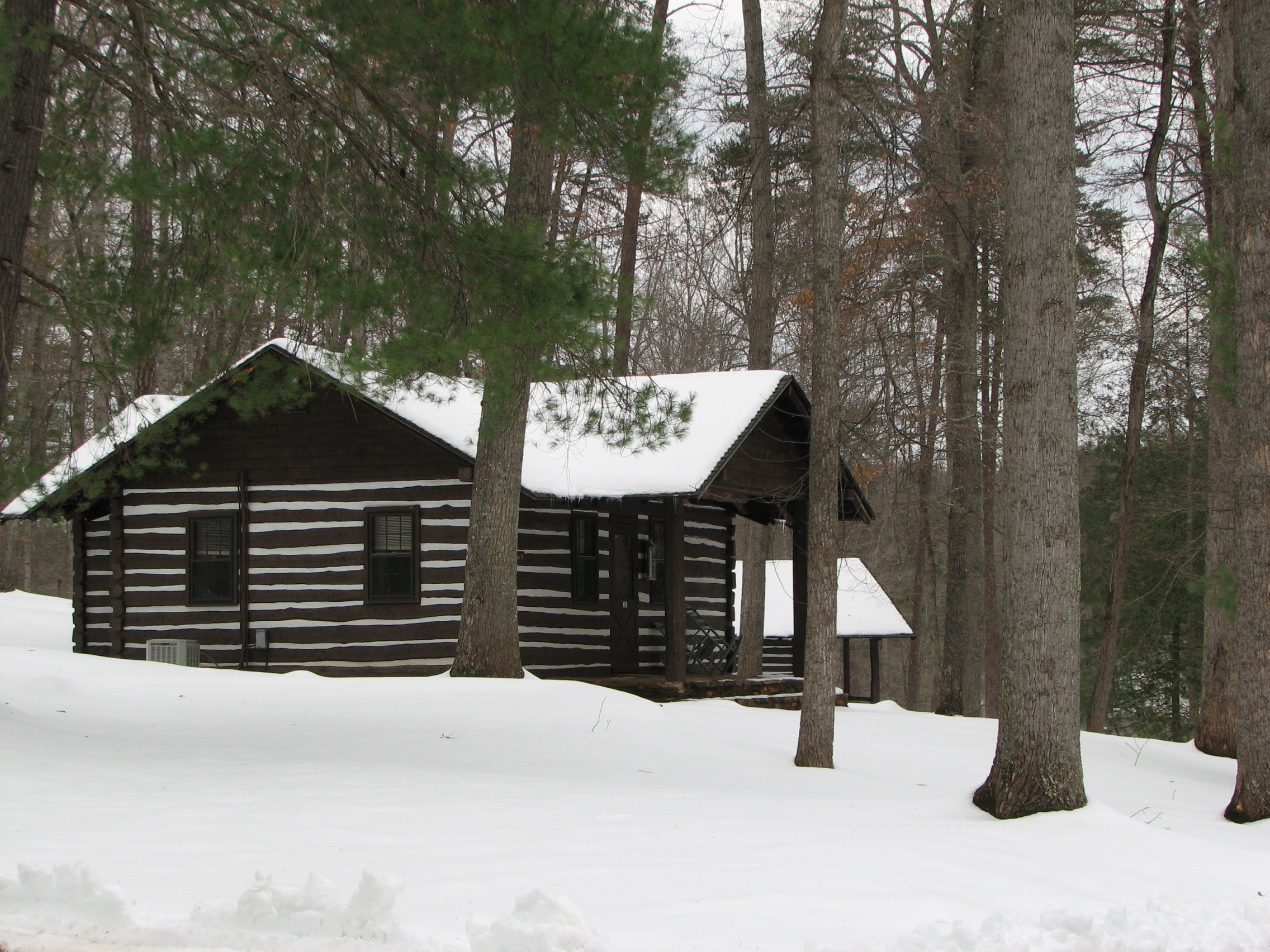
- A cabin in the park in winter
- Location: 967 Fairystone Lake Dr., Stuart, Virginia
- Area: 4,868.6 acres (1,970.3 ha)
- Built: 1933
- Architect: Myers, E.L. Jr.; et al.
- Architectural style: Late 19th And Early 20th Century American Movements, Modern Movement
- NRHP reference No.: 07000338
- VLR No.: 070-0057

Significant dates
- Added to NRHP: April 10, 2007
- Designated VLR: June 8, 2006

Fairy Stone State Park, located in Patrick County, Virginia, is the largest of the original Virginia six state parks that opened on June 15, 1936, and is named for the cross-shaped "fairy stones" (staurolite) commonly found in the vicinity of the park.

The park's land was donated in 1933 by Junius B. Fishburn, former president of the Southwest Virginia Trust Co. and former owner of the Roanoke Times. The park is 4,741 acres (19.19 km^{2}), making it the largest of the six original parks and the second largest today after Pocahontas State Park. Some of the park's features, including its lake and many structures still in use, were built by the Civilian Conservation Corps.

== See also ==
- List of Virginia state parks
