= Ararat, Virginia =

Unincorporated community in Virginia, United States

Ararat
- Unincorporated community
- Location within the Commonwealth of Virginia Ararat (the United States)
- Coordinates: 36°35′56″N 80°30′38″W
- Country: United States
- State: Virginia
- County: Patrick

Government
- Time zone: UTC−5 (Eastern (EST))
  - Summer (DST): UTC−4 (EDT)

Ararat is an unincorporated community in Patrick County, Virginia, United States, south of the Blue Ridge Parkway and north of Mount Airy, North Carolina. Ararat is located near the Virginia–North Carolina state line, approximately five miles (8.0 km) north of Mount Airy and about 25 miles (40 km) west of Stuart. The community's name comes from the Ararat River, which flows through the area. The River takes its name from the Jefferson Fry Map of 1751, which calls Pilot Mountain part of the "Mountains of Ararat." The Saura Indian name for nearby Pilot Mountain across the state line in Surry County, North Carolina is "The Pilot" and the mountain reverted to that. The large monadnock mountain was thought to resemble a bullfrog and the Native Americans named it "Ratratrat," after the sound the animal makes. Early white settlers thought what they were saying sounded like "Ararat," the mountain which, according to the Bible, was the landing point of Noah's Ark.

== Education ==
Blue Ridge Elementary School is located in the community.

== Notable people ==
Several famous people were born in the community, such as the Reverend Bob Childress; "The Man Who Moved A Mountain," and James Ewell Brown "Jeb" Stuart, the Major General of Cavalry for Robert E. Lee during the American Civil War. Also, First Lieutenant Levi Barnard, eulogized by the band Old Crow Medicine Show in their song, "Levi".

== Historic site ==
The J.E.B. Stuart Birthplace, the Laurel Hill Farm, is a preserved private park in the community that is open for self-guided tours daily and holds a Civil War encampment the first full weekend of October each year.

== Sources ==
- Davids, Richard C., ' ' The Man Who Moved A Mountain ' ', Augsburg Fortress Publishers, 1986, ISBN 0-8006-1237-X, ISBN 978-0-8006-1237-5.
- Perry, Thomas D., ' 'J. E. B. Stuart's Birthplace: The History of the Laurel Hill Farm ' ', Laurel Hill Publishing, 2008, ISBN 1-4382-3934-3, ISBN 978-1-4382-3934-7.
- Smith, Karen Cecil., ' 'Orlean Puckett: The Life of a Mountain Midwife, 1844-1939 ' ', Parkway Publishers, 2003,ISBN 1-887905-72-3, ISBN 978-1-887905-72-5.
- Perry, Thomas D., 'Ararat Virginia: A Guide from Willis Gap to Kibler Valley ' ', Laurel Hill Publishing, 2009, ISBN 978-1451518405 ISBN 1451518404.
