= Laurel Hill Farm =

Historic house in Virginia, United States

- J.E.B. Stuart Birthplace
- U.S. National Register of Historic Places
- Virginia Landmarks Register
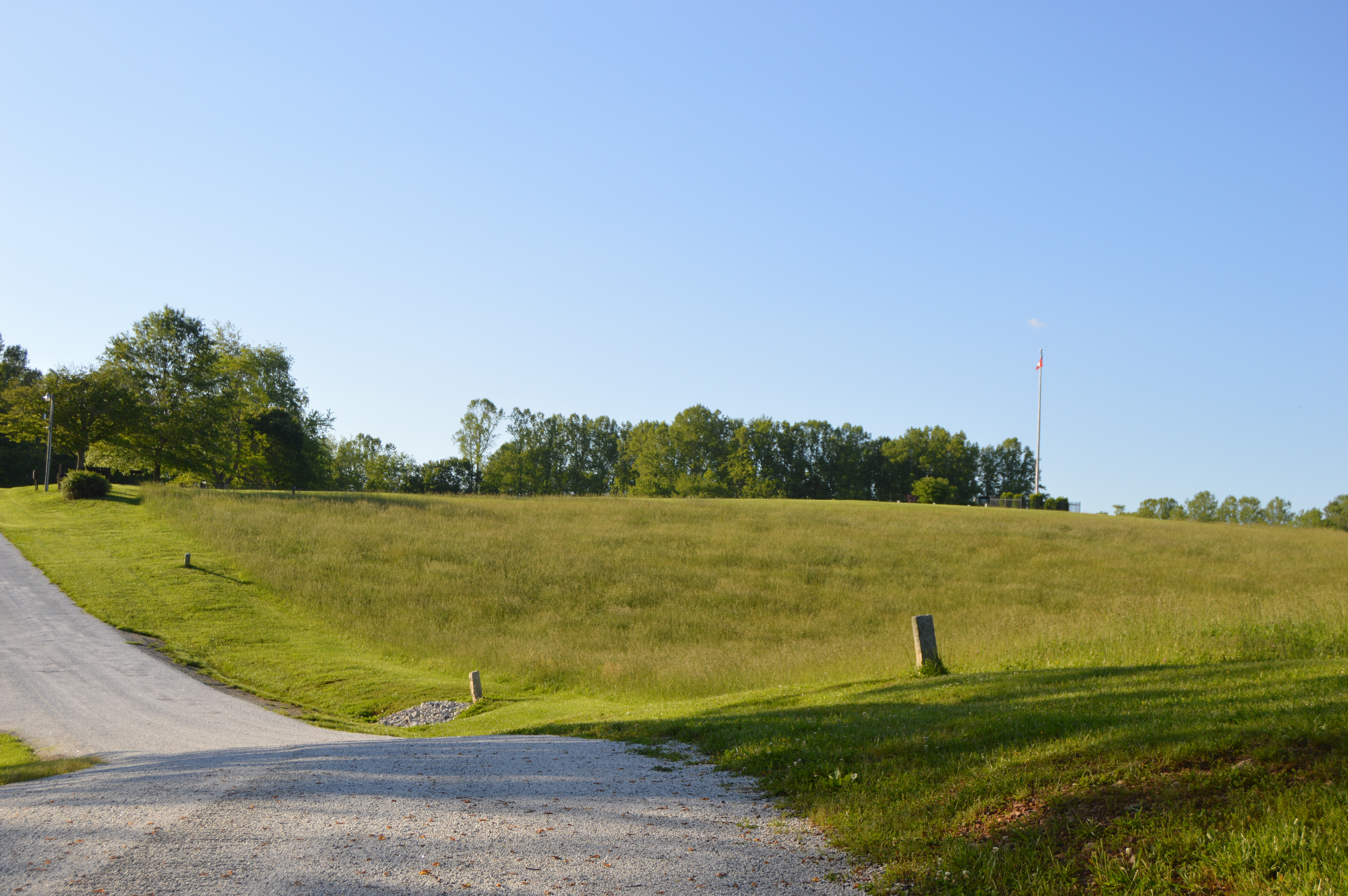
- Fields at the site

- Location within Virginia Location within the United States
- Location: N side of VA 773, W of jct. with VA 617, near Ararat, Virginia
- Coordinates: 36°33′48″N 80°33′16″W
- Area: 71 acres (29 ha)
- Built: 1820
- NRHP reference No.: 98001161
- VLR No.: 070-0060

Significant dates
- Added to NRHP: September 24, 1998
- Designated VLR: December 3, 1997

Laurel Hill Farm is a private park and historic home located in Ararat, Virginia. The birthplace of James Ewell Brown "Jeb" Stuart, seventy-five acres of the 1,500 acres (6.1 km^{2}) plantation owned by the Stuart Family was saved in 1992 by the J. E. B. Stuart Birthplace Preservation Trust with assistance from the Civil War Trust, a division of the American Battlefield Trust. The J. E. B. Stuart Birthplace Preservation Trust, founded by Historian and Author Thomas D. "Tom" Perry, is a non-profit corporation that has interpreted the site and holds events on the property.

== J. E. B. Stuart ==
James Ewell Brown Stuart was born on February 6, 1833, as the eighth of eleven children to Archibald and Elizabeth Letcher Pannill Stuart. He attended Emory and Henry College in Southwest Virginia before receiving an appointment to the United States Military Academy at West Point, New York. Stuart graduated 13 of 46 in 1854 and spent seven years in the United States Army, mainly in Kansas in the First U. S. Cavalry. Stuart was present at John Brown's Raid on Harper's Ferry in 1859 before resigning in May 1861 to fight for the Confederate States of America. Stuart rose in rank to Major General commanding the cavalry of Robert E. Lee's Army of Northern Virginia. He died on May 12, 1864, after receiving wounds at the Battle of Yellow Tavern. He is buried in Hollywood Cemetery in Richmond, Virginia.

== Annual Events ==
The first weekend of October a Civil War encampment is held at the site. Beginning in 1990, this event raises money for the upkeep of the site.

== History of the Laurel Hill Farm ==
The Laurel Hill Farm has a varied history told from archaeology completed by the College of William and Mary, which found the house site along with Native-American artifacts. Peter Jefferson, father of Thomas Jefferson, surveyed the southern boundary of the property. The first member of J. E. B. Stuart's family to live on the property was William Letcher (1750–1780), who was killed on the farm in August 1780 by a Tory during the American Revolution. Letcher's grave on the property is the oldest marked grave site in Patrick County. J. E. B. Stuart's family came to the property in 1825 and lived there until 1859 when Elizabeth Stuart sold the property to two men from nearby Mount Airy, North Carolina.
