= Smith River (Virginia) =

- Location within Virginia Location within North Carolina Location within the United States

Physical characteristics
- Source
  - coordinates: 36.7559687°N 80.3489478°W
- Mouth
  - coordinates: 36.4806937°N 79.7511464°W

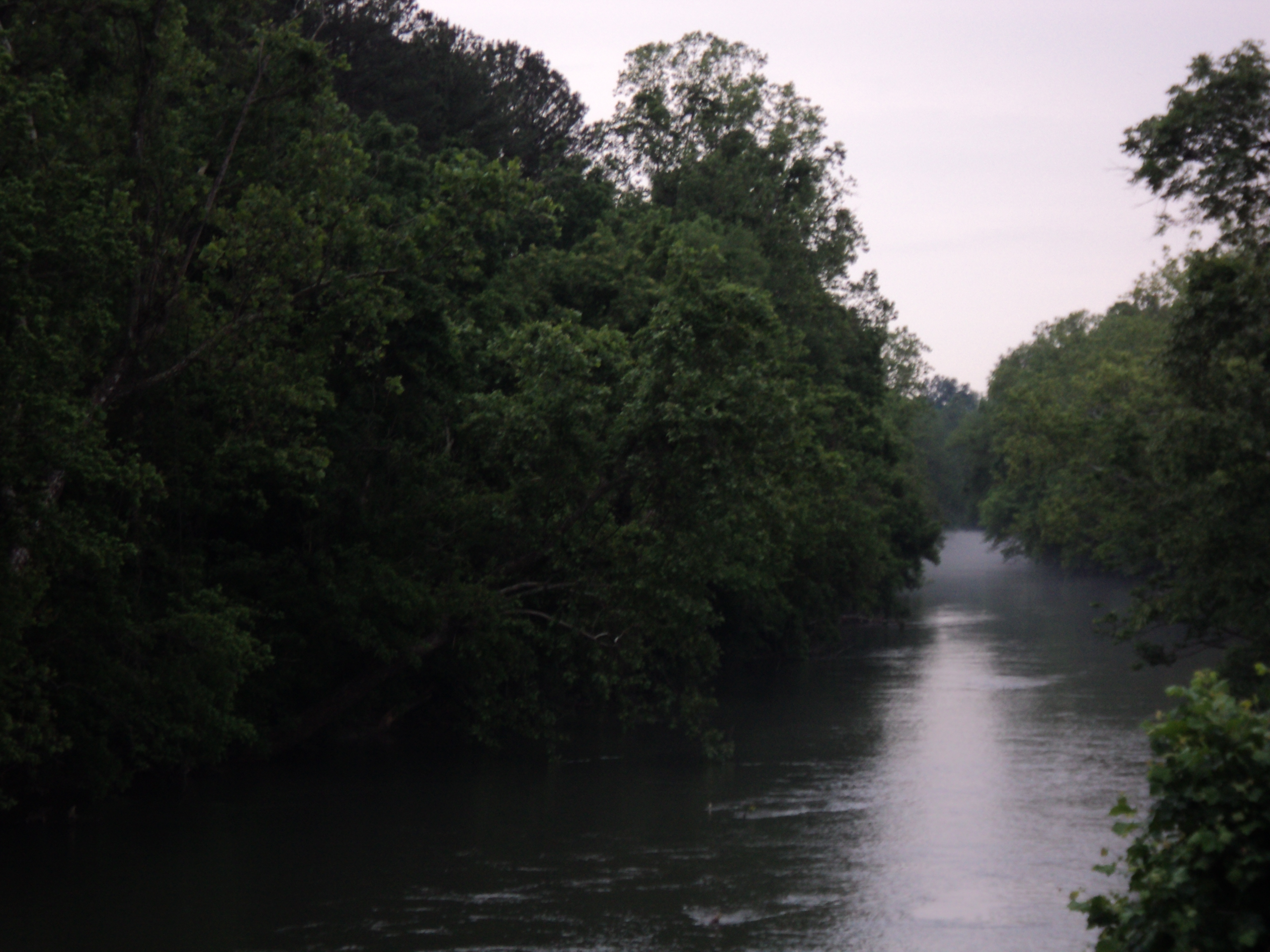
Evening view, Smith River, Henry County, Virginia

The Smith River is a river in the U.S. states of Virginia and North Carolina. It is a tributary of the Dan River, which it joins at Eden, North Carolina. According to the United States Geological Survey and regional histories, variant names are Irvin River, Irvine River, Irwin River, and Smith's River.

The Smith River is a tailrace stream, fed by water from Philpott Lake. Water flow is regulated at Philpott Dam according to the demands of hydroelectric power generation, downstream water temperature control, and adequate water levels for recreational use. From its source at Philpott Dam, the river runs 44.5 mi through Franklin County and Henry County before reaching the North Carolina border. After crossing the border, the Smith River runs an additional 5.25 miles through Rockingham County, North Carolina before its confluence with the Dan River.

Smith River offers year round trout habitat from Philpot through Martinsville. Headwaters come from Philpot Lake Dam.

== History ==
Archaeological evidence from sites surrounding the Smith River indicate that the river was first visited by hunter-gatherers during the late PaleoIndian (ca. 9,000-8,000 B.C.) and Early Archaic (8,000-6,000 B.C.) periods. From this early period through ca. A.D. 1200, the Smith River Valley was visited seasonally, by small bands of hunters taking advantage of the rich fauna inhabiting the river valley. The flood plains surrounding the Smith River were first permanently settled by Virginia Indians in the late prehistoric era, known archaeologically as the Late Woodland period, and regionally as the Dan River Phase. Between A.D. 1250 and A.D. 1450, Siouan-speaking groups of the Virginia and North Carolina Piedmont founded agricultural villages along the length of the river. Archaeological evidence indicates that village sites along the Smith River were protected by wooden palisades, and relied heavily on the cultivation of maize. At least one of these villages, the Philpott site (44Hr004), was occupied by the Sara Indians through the 1650s.

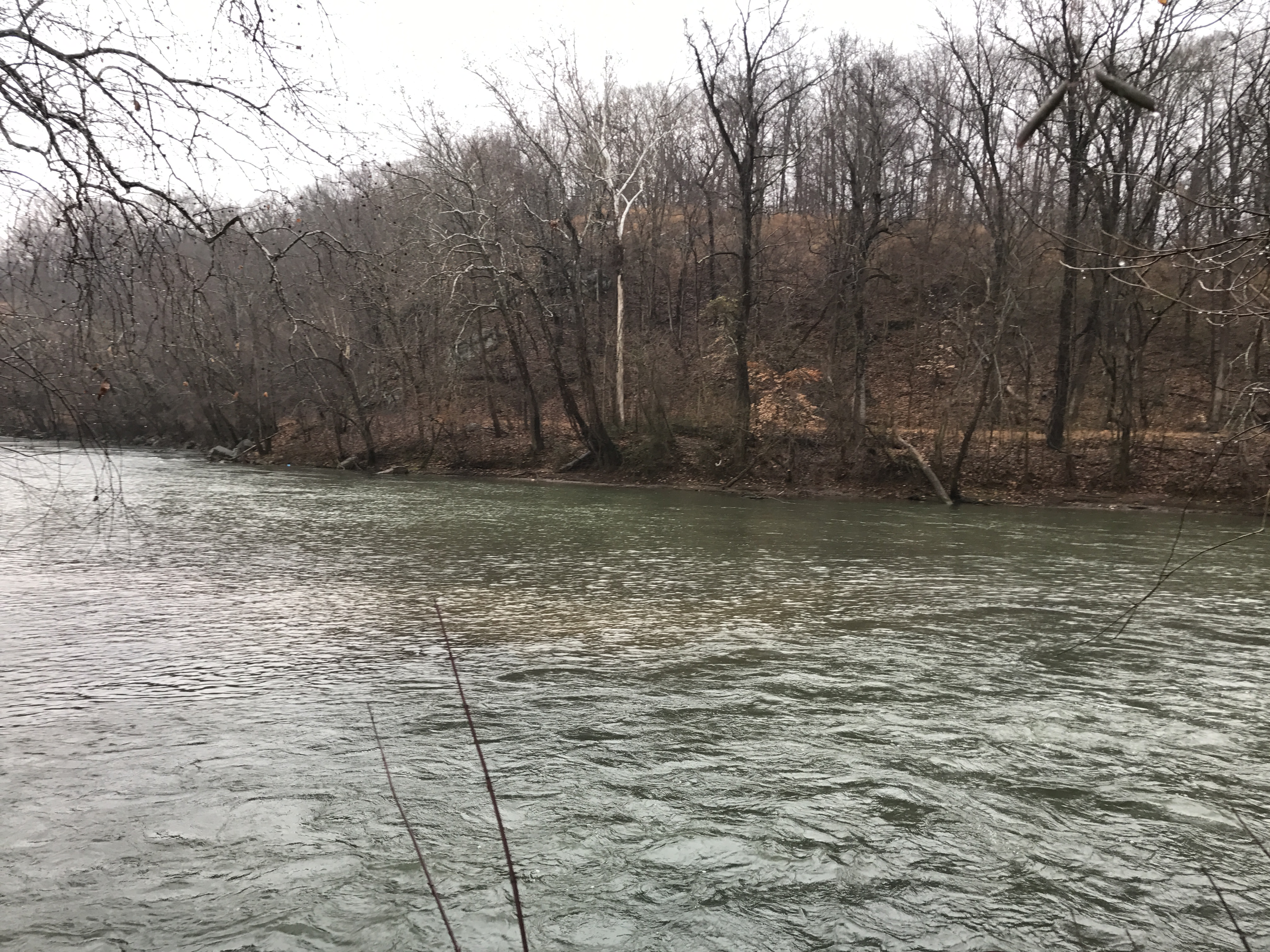
Smith River in Eden, North Carolina

Some of the earliest Europeans to visit the Smith River were members of a survey party led by William Byrd II in 1728, tasked with mapping the Virginia-North Carolina border. Encountering the river on the October 18, 1728, Byrd named the body of water "the river Irvine" after Alexander Irvine, who served as a surveyor for the party while on leave from his role as professor of mathematics at the College of William and Mary. An account from William Byrd's The History of the Dividing Line concerning the river states,

"... we descended some stony hills for about half a mile, and then came upon a large branch of the river, which we christened the Irvin, in honour of our learned professor. This river we forded with much difficulty and some danger, by reason of the hollow spaces betwixt the rocks, into which our horses plunged almost every step. The Irvin runs into the Dan about four miles to the southward of the line, and seemed to roll down its waters from the N. N. W. in a very full and limpid stream, and the murmur it made, in tumbling over the rocks, caused the situation to appear very romantic, and had almost made some of the company poetical, though they drank nothing but water. We encamped on a pleasant hill, overlooking the river, which seemed to be deep every where except just where we forded. In the mean time, neither that chain of rocks, nor any other that we could observe in this stream, was so uninterrupted, but that there were several breaks where a canoe, or even a moderate flat-bottomed boat, might shear clear. Nor have we reason to believe there are any other falls (except the great ones, thirty miles below Moniseep ford) that reach quite across, so as to interrupt the navigation for small craft."

The name Irvine River, occasionally spelled Irvin or Irwin River, appears in land deeds as early as the 1730s, and is first depicted on a map drawn by Edward Moseley in 1737. This name persisted through the late eighteenth century among colonial administrators in eastern and central Virginia, notably depicted and labeled on the Fry-Jefferson map of 1755.

As early as 1743, land entries were being made in reference to "Smith's River," a seemingly new name for what those in other parts of Virginia referred to as the Irvine River. Regional historians believe that this name, as well as the Smith Mountains, have their origins with two prominent landowners of the early 1740s, Gideon and Daniel Smith. From the mid eighteenth through the mid nineteenth century, the names "Smith's River" and "Irvine River" were used interchangeably, the former used as a regional vernacular, the latter as an administrative reference By the mid to late nineteenth century; however, the name "Smith River" become commonplace, as Irvine fell out of use.

In the late nineteenth and early twentieth centuries, the Smith River emerged as an important source of water power for lumber and textile mills. Initially supplying railroad ties to the new Winston-Salem branch of the Norfolk and Western railroad, several lumber operations repurposed their Smith River mills after the completion of the railroad to manufacture wood furniture. Notable among these was Bassett Furniture, established in 1902, which continues to operate today on its original mill site on the Smith River.

- Philpott Lake
- List of rivers of Virginia
