= Patrick County, Virginia =

County in Virginia, United States

- County
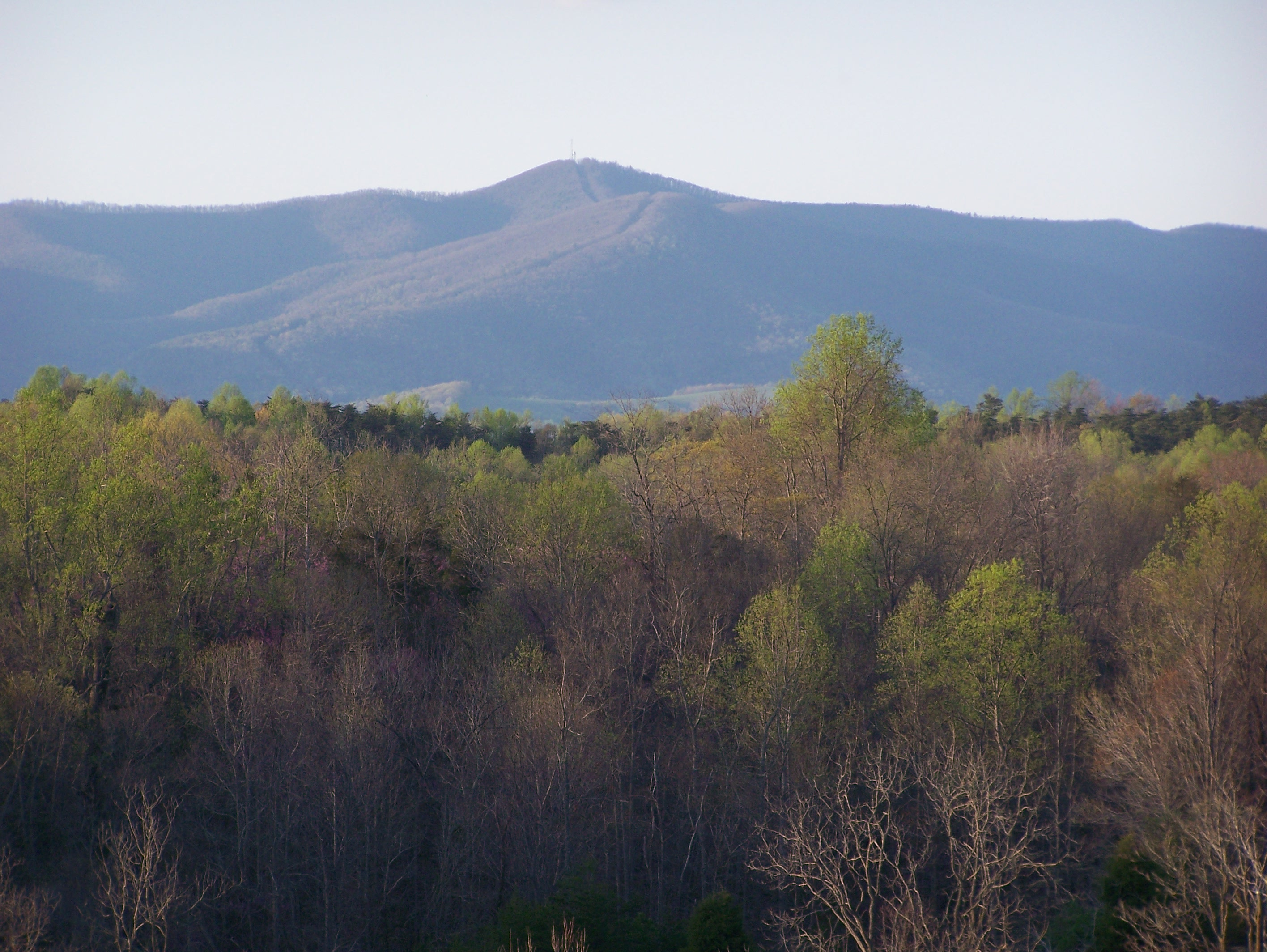
- Bull Mountain in Patrick County

- Seal

- Location within the U.S. state of Virginia
- Coordinates: 36°41′N 80°17′W
- Country: United States
- State: Virginia
- Founded: 1791
- Named for: Patrick Henry
- Seat: Stuart
- Largest town: Stuart

Area
  - Total: 486 sq mi (1,260 km^{2})
  - Land: 483 sq mi (1,250 km^{2})
  - Water: 2.8 sq mi (7.3 km^{2}) 0.6%

Population (2020)
  - Total: 17,608
  - Estimate (2025): 17,424 ▼
  - Density: 36.5/sq mi (14.1/km^{2})
- Time zone: UTC−5 (Eastern)
  - Summer (DST): UTC−4 (EDT)
- Congressional district: 9th
- Website: www.co.patrick.va.us

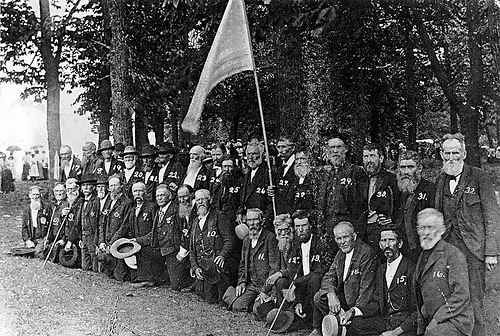
July 4, 1900, Patrick County, Virginia

Patrick County is a county located on the central southern border of the Commonwealth of Virginia. As of the 2020 census, the county's population was 17,608. Its county seat is Stuart. It is located within both the rolling hills and valleys of the Piedmont Region and the more mountainous regions of Southwest Virginia.

== History ==
Patrick County was formed in 1791. It was originally a part of Henry County. Henry County, which was formed in 1777, was named after Patrick Henry.

Prior to the formation of Patrick County, one of Virginia colony's first frontier forts lay within the boundaries of what was then Halifax County on the banks of the North Mayo River. The location of Fort Mayo, now marked by a Virginia state historic marker, lies within present-day Patrick County. A number of forts built by Virginia colonists from the Potomac River south to North Carolina, was commanded by Captain Samuel Harris in 1756. It was also the year in which George Washington made a tour of Fort Mayo and several other forts on the Virginia frontier. Fort Mayo was the southernmost of the Virginia frontier forts and saw action during the French and Indian War (1754-1763) between the English and French and associated Native American allies.

One of Patrick County's most prominent early settlers was Col. Abraham Penn (sometimes written Abram Penn), born in 1743 in what is today Amherst County, Virginia. Penn qualified as Lieutenant in the Amherst County militia in June 1768, and led a company under Col. Andrew Lewis at the Battle of Point Pleasant in 1774. Penn later moved with his wife Ruth (née Stovall) to present-day Henry County, Virginia, where he patented lands at the later site of Beaver Creek Plantation. Penn served on the Committee of Safety for both Henry and Pittsylvania counties, and as a delegate to the Virginia General Assembly from Henry County.

Eventually selling those lands to the Hairston family, Penn moved with his family a few miles farther west to what is today Patrick County, where he built his plantation home Poplar Grove. During the American Revolution, Col. Penn ordered the muster of some 300 militiamen under his command to march south to aid General Nathanael Greene at the battle of Guilford Court House. Historians question whether the troops arrived in time for the fighting.

It is documented that Penn commanded militia in the Battle of Eutaw Springs. Penn was later present at Yorktown to witness the surrender of the British forces under General Cornwallis.

Col. Penn was one of the organizers of Patrick County, which he served many years as a justice. The unincorporated community of Penn's Store is named for Col. Penn and his descendants. The Abram Penn Highway in Patrick County is named for Col. Penn, who died in 1801.

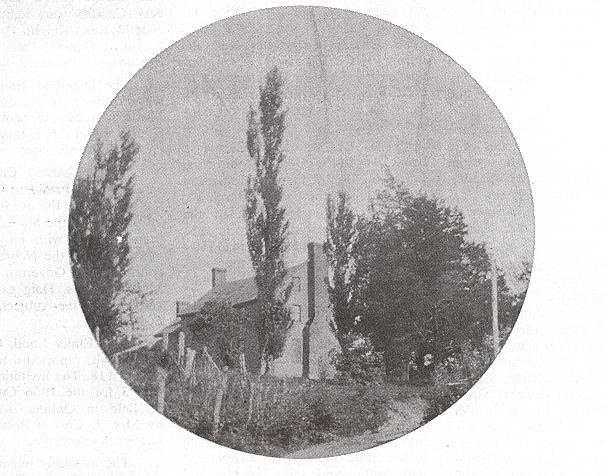
Poplar Grove, Patrick County home of Col. Abram Penn

On October 24, 2004, a private corporate plane crashed on Bull Mountain, killing all eight passengers and two crew, including Busch Series racer Ricky Hendrick and Hendrick Motorsports lead engine builder Randy Dorton.

On November 6, 2023, Governor Glenn Youngkin issued a state of emergency due to wildfires, citing a fire in the Tuggles Gap community.

== Geography ==
According to the U.S. Census Bureau, the county has a total area of 486 square miles (1,260 km^{2}), of which 483 square miles (1,250 km^{2}) is land and 2.8 square miles (7.3 km^{2}) (0.6%) is water. Patrick County is one of the 423 counties served by the Appalachian Regional Commission, and it is identified as part of "Greater Appalachia" by Colin Woodard in his book American Nations: A History of the Eleven Rival Regional Cultures of North America.

Patrick County has two defined physiographic provinces lying within its boundaries. One-third of Patrick County is in the rolling Piedmont region, and the remaining two-thirds are in the picturesque Blue Ridge Mountains, where the Blue Ridge Parkway forms the county's western border with Carroll and Floyd counties to the north.

=== Adjacent counties ===
- Carroll County - west
- Floyd County - northwest
- Franklin County - northeast
- Henry County - east
- Stokes County, North Carolina - south
- Surry County, North Carolina - southwest

=== National protected areas ===
- Blue Ridge Parkway (part) including Rocky Knob Recreation Area (part)

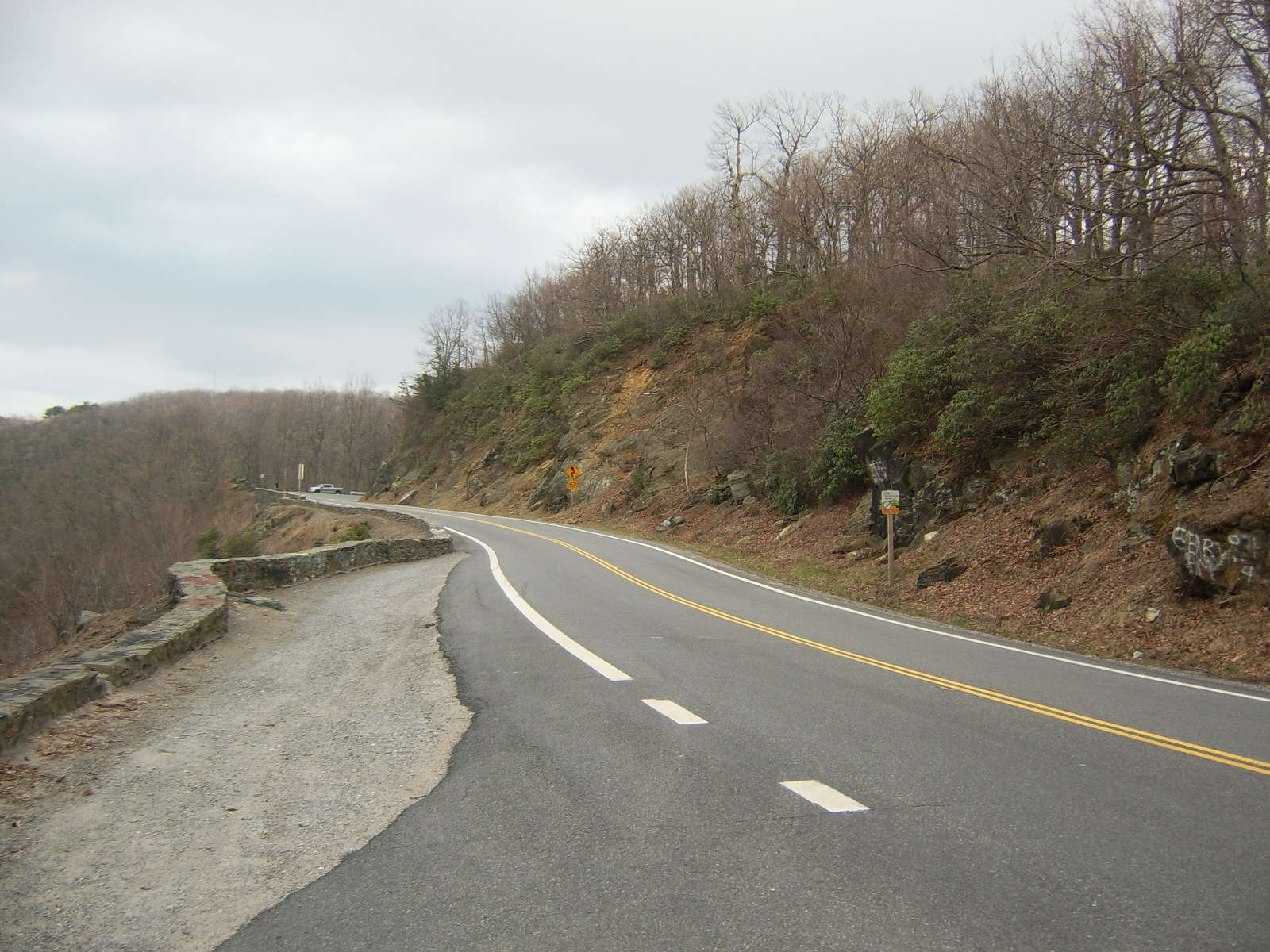
US 58 in Patrick County

=== Major highways ===
- US 58
- Blue Ridge Parkway
- SR 8
- SR 40
- SR 57
- SR 103

== Demographics ==
Historical population
Census	Pop.	Note	%±
1800	4,331		—
1810	4,695		8.4%
1820	5,089		8.4%
1830	7,395		45.3%
1840	8,032		8.6%
1850	9,609		19.6%
1860	9,359		−2.6%
1870	10,161		8.6%
1880	12,833		26.3%
1890	14,147		10.2%
1900	15,403		8.9%
1910	17,195		11.6%
1920	16,850		−2.0%
1930	15,787		−6.3%
1940	16,613		5.2%
1950	15,642		−5.8%
1960	15,282		−2.3%
1970	15,282		0.0%
1980	17,647		15.5%
1990	17,473		−1.0%
2000	19,407		11.1%
2010	18,490		−4.7%
2020	17,608		−4.8%
2025 (est.)	17,424	▼	−1.0%
U.S. Decennial Census; 1790-1960 1900-1990; 1990-2000 2010 2020

=== Racial and ethnic composition ===
Patrick County, Virginia – Racial and ethnic composition Note: the US Census treats Hispanic/Latino as an ethnic category. This table excludes Latinos from the racial categories and assigns them to a separate category. Hispanics/Latinos may be of any race.
Race / Ethnicity (NH = Non-Hispanic)	Pop 1980	Pop 1990	Pop 2000	Pop 2010	Pop 2020	% 1980	% 1990	% 2000	% 2010	% 2020
White alone (NH)	16,122	16,069	17,667	16,680	15,577	91.36%	91.96%	91.03%	90.21%	88.47%
Black or African American alone (NH)	1,320	1,248	1,178	1,085	831	7.48%	7.14%	6.07%	5.87%	4.72%
Native American or Alaska Native alone (NH)	6	13	39	50	24	0.03%	0.07%	0.20%	0.27%	0.14%
Asian alone (NH)	41	19	32	42	43	0.23%	0.11%	0.16%	0.23%	0.24%
Native Hawaiian or Pacific Islander alone (NH)	x	x	5	0	3	x	x	0.03%	0.00%	0.02%
Other race alone (NH)	0	1	11	8	72	0.00%	0.01%	0.06%	0.04%	0.41%
Mixed race or Multiracial (NH)	x	x	112	181	491	x	x	0.58%	0.98%	2.79%
Hispanic or Latino (any race)	158	123	363	444	567	0.90%	0.70%	1.87%	2.40%	3.22%
Total	17,647	17,473	19,407	18,490	17,608	100.00%	100.00%	100.00%	100.00%	100.00%

=== 2020 census ===
As of the 2020 census, the county had a population of 17,608. The median age was 50.8 years. 17.5% of residents were under the age of 18 and 27.5% of residents were 65 years of age or older. For every 100 females there were 97.8 males, and for every 100 females age 18 and over there were 95.3 males age 18 and over.

The racial makeup of the county was 89.3% White, 4.8% Black or African American, 0.2% American Indian and Alaska Native, 0.2% Asian, 0.0% Native Hawaiian and Pacific Islander, 1.9% from some other race, and 3.6% from two or more races. Hispanic or Latino residents of any race comprised 3.2% of the population.

0.0% of residents lived in urban areas, while 100.0% lived in rural areas.

There were 7,839 households in the county, of which 21.6% had children under the age of 18 living with them and 25.8% had a female householder with no spouse or partner present. About 32.4% of all households were made up of individuals and 17.3% had someone living alone who was 65 years of age or older.

There were 9,994 housing units, of which 21.6% were vacant. Among occupied housing units, 76.6% were owner-occupied and 23.4% were renter-occupied. The homeowner vacancy rate was 1.5% and the rental vacancy rate was 9.5%.

=== 2010 Census ===
As of the 2010 census, there were 18,490 people, 8,081 households, and 5,410 families residing in the county. The population density was 40 people per square mile (15 people/km^{2}). There were 10,083 housing units at an average density of 20 per square mile (7.7/km^{2}). The racial makeup of the county was 91.10% White, 5.9% Black or African American, 0.30% Native American, 0.20% Asian, 0.00% Pacific Islander, 1.40% from other races, and 1.10% from two or more races. 2.40% of the population were Hispanic or Latino of any race.

As of the 2000 Census, there were 8,141 households, out of which 28.50% had children under the age of 18 living with them, 58.90% were married couples living together, 8.60% had a female householder with no husband present, and 28.60% were non-families. 25.80% of all households were made up of individuals, and 11.40% had someone living alone who was 65 years of age or older. The average household size was 2.36 and the average family size was 2.81.

In the county, the population was spread out, with 21.70% under the age of 18, 7.10% from 18 to 24, 28.00% from 25 to 44, 26.70% from 45 to 64, and 16.50% who were 65 years of age or older. The median age was 40 years. For every 100 females there were 96.90 males. For every 100 females aged 18 and over, there were 94.90 males.

The median income for a household in the county was $28,705, and the median income for a family was $36,232. Males had a median income of $25,391 versus $18,711 for females. The per capita income for the county was $15,574. About 9.60% of families and 13.40% of the population were below the poverty line, including 15.40% of those under age 18 and 18.00% of those age 65 or over.

== Distinctions ==
Part of the Rocky Knob American Viticultural Area, as defined by the federal government, is located in Patrick County. Patrick County was also a setting for the ministry of Reverend Bob Childress whose life was chronicled in the book "The Man Who Moved a Mountain".

== Tourism ==
Patrick County, Virginia, is a destination located in the Blue Ridge Mountains, featuring elevations ranging from 900 feet to over 3,000 feet. It is home to Fairy Stone State Park, Jack's Creek Covered Bridge (one of the state's remaining historic covered bridges, and provides access to the nearby Mabry Mill on the Blue Ridge Parkway. The county hosts annual events including the East coast's longest-running beach music festival and serves as the home base for the NASCAR team Wood Brothers Racing.

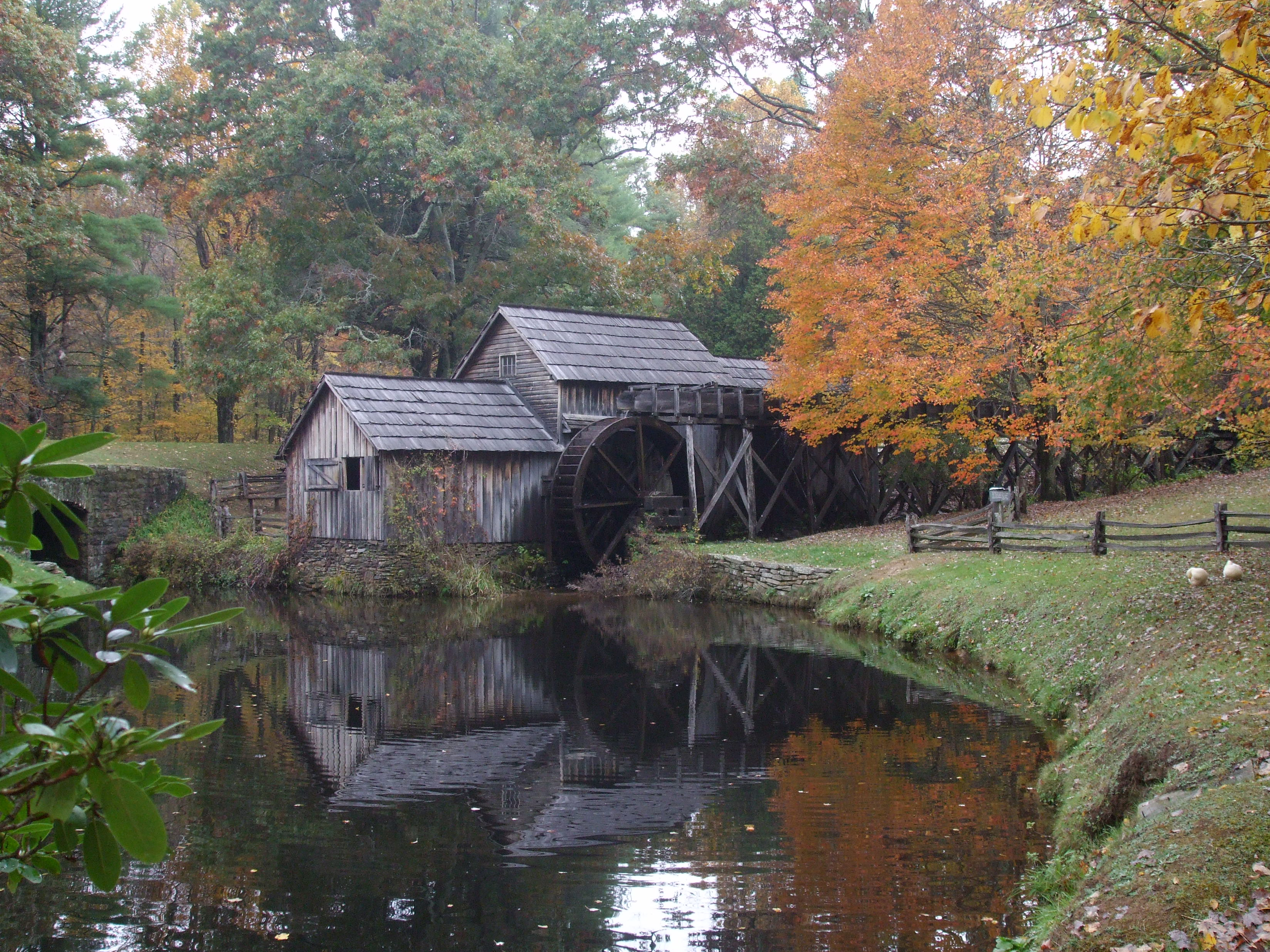
Mabry's Mill

Patrick County is featured on the Virginia is For Lovers website.

The Bob White Covered Bridge once located in Woolwine washed away by Flood Waters in September 2015. Bob White Covered Bridge Washes Away

== Education ==
Patrick County Public Schools has seven total public schools, of which four are for grades K-7, one is for grades K-3, one is for grades 4–7, and Patrick County High School is for grade 8–12. In the 2024-2025 school year, Patrick County Public Schools had 2,276 students, 166.06 teachers (on an FTE basis), and a student teacher ratio of 13.71. One school, Stuart Elementary was recognized in 2008 as receiving the Governor's VIP award. Recently two schools, Stuart Elementary and Woolwine Elementary were designated as Distinguished Title I schools. In 2006, Patrick County Public Schools was listed as an outperforming school district, one of 12 in the state of Virginia, by Standard and Poor's. All of the schools have received "full accreditation" status by the State of Virginia and all schools have met Adequate Yearly Progress (AYP) status as defined by the No Child Left Behind Act of 2001.

== Communities ==
=== Town ===
- Stuart

=== Census-designated place ===
- Meadows of Dan
- Patrick Springs

=== Other unincorporated communities ===
- Ararat
- Claudville
- Critz
- Fairystone
- Mayberry – See Mayberry#The name "Mayberry".
- Penns Store
- Russell Creek
- Vesta
- Woolwine

== Notable people ==
- Confederate cavalry commander Maj. Gen. J.E.B. Stuart was born at the Laurel Hill Farm in Patrick County on February 6, 1833.
- Rev. Bob Childress, Presbyterian minister whose life is chronicled in "The Man Who Moved a Mountain," whose unfinished autobiography and the biographies of his children are preserved in "Childress Cousins from the Hills and Hollows of Southern Virginia," and whose legacy includes six rock churches in Patrick, Carroll, and Floyd Counties.
- Herb Hash was a Major League Baseball player for the Boston Red Sox in the late 1930s and early 1940s. Hash has been inducted into the University of Richmond Baseball of Fame. He was born in Woolwine.
- Gerald L. Baliles served as Governor of Virginia from 1986 through 1990.
- Mary Sue Terry served as Attorney General of Virginia from 1986 until 1993, the first female Attorney General in Virginia history.
- Robert Lee Tudor, a member of the New York State Assembly from 1913 to 1917, was born in Critz in 1874.
- Martin Clark, author and Virginia Circuit Court judge.
- Brad Clontz was a Major League Baseball relief pitcher for the Atlanta Braves, Los Angeles Dodgers, New York Mets, and the Pittsburgh Pirates.
- Wood Brothers Racing, the NASCAR Racing Team.
- Tim Goad, former American Football League Defensive Tackle for the New England Patriots, Cleveland Browns, and Baltimore Ravens.
- Richard Joshua Reynolds, founder of R.J. Reynolds Tobacco Co., was born at Rock Spring Plantation, near present-day Critz, Va. on July 20, 1850.
- J.J. Webster, served as County Commissioner for Rockingham County, North Carolina, was born in Patrick County in 1898.

== Government ==
Patrick County is governed by an elected five-member Board of Supervisors. Management of the county is vested in a Board-appointed County Administrator.

Patrick County Board of Supervisors
Name	Party	First Election	District
Andrew Overby (Vice Chair)	Ind	2024	Dan River
Doug Perry	Ind	2021	Smith River
Steve Marshall	Ind	2023	Blue Ridge
Clayton Kendrick	Ind	2019	Mayo River
Jonathan Wood (Chair)	Ind	2023	Peters Creek

There are also five elected Constitutional Officers:

- Clerk of the Circuit Court: Morgan Boothe
- Commonwealth's Attorney: Dayna Bobbitt
- Sheriff: Dan Smith
- Commissioner of Revenue: Glennda Morse
- Treasurer: Sandra Stone

United States presidential election results for Patrick County, Virginia
Year	Republican		Democratic		Third party(ies)	
Year	No.	%	No.	%	No.	%
1912	434	29.13%	698	46.85%	358	24.03%
1916	815	48.22%	872	51.60%	3	0.18%
1920	1,230	51.53%	1,154	48.35%	3	0.13%
1924	783	40.53%	1,138	58.90%	11	0.57%
1928	1,191	57.43%	883	42.57%	0	0.00%
1932	486	26.23%	1,342	72.42%	25	1.35%
1936	726	31.29%	1,588	68.45%	6	0.26%
1940	514	25.71%	1,479	73.99%	6	0.30%
1944	706	33.68%	1,383	65.98%	7	0.33%
1948	648	35.22%	760	41.30%	432	23.48%
1952	1,314	45.75%	1,554	54.11%	4	0.14%
1956	1,345	43.93%	1,677	54.77%	40	1.31%
1960	1,362	44.98%	1,655	54.66%	11	0.36%
1964	1,468	38.88%	2,306	61.07%	2	0.05%
1968	2,187	41.46%	1,105	20.95%	1,983	37.59%
1972	2,951	73.35%	942	23.42%	130	3.23%
1976	2,349	43.69%	2,740	50.96%	288	5.36%
1980	3,436	56.12%	2,382	38.90%	305	4.98%
1984	4,703	70.47%	1,908	28.59%	63	0.94%
1988	3,990	64.06%	2,093	33.60%	146	2.34%
1992	3,521	48.98%	2,465	34.29%	1,203	16.73%
1996	3,547	52.39%	2,301	33.98%	923	13.63%
2000	4,901	66.36%	2,254	30.52%	230	3.11%
2004	5,507	67.04%	2,572	31.31%	136	1.66%
2008	5,491	64.37%	2,879	33.75%	161	1.89%
2012	5,622	68.07%	2,417	29.27%	220	2.66%
2016	6,454	75.71%	1,768	20.74%	303	3.55%
2020	7,485	78.51%	1,954	20.50%	95	1.00%
2024	7,746	79.70%	1,886	19.41%	87	0.90%

== See also ==
- National Register of Historic Places listings in Patrick County, Virginia
