= List of Masonic buildings in the United States =

List of Masonic buildings in the United States identifies notable Masonic buildings in the United States. These have served as meeting halls by Masonic lodges, Grand Lodges or other Masonic bodies. Many of the buildings were built to house Masonic meetings and ritual activities in their upper floors, and to provide commercial space below. In small towns, these were frequently the grandest and tallest buildings. Many of the buildings listed have received landmark status, either by being listed on the National Register of Historic Places (NRHP) or listed by various State or City preservation agencies.

In 2021, more than 400 Masonic buildings are listed here.

KEY

Individually NRHP-listed
NRHP-listed historic district
Contributing property in NRHP-listed historic district
Unlisted

== States ==
=== Alabama ===
	Building	Image	Dates	Location	City, State	Description
1	Masonic Lodge		c.1915 built 2000 NRHP CP-listed	115-123 Main; 32.943823°N 85.953053°W	Alexander City, Alabama	Three-story two-part commercial block building in National Register-listed Alexander City Commercial Historic District.
2	West End Masonic Temple		1926 built 1987 NRHP-listed	1346 Tuscaloosa Ave. 33°29′33″N 86°51′19″W	Birmingham, Alabama	Classical Revival building which served as a Masonic Hall until 1985 when it was sold and converted to office space. The building was destroyed in a fire on New Year's Day, 1996, but, oddly remains NRHP-listed in 2009.
3	Colored Masonic Temple		1922 built 1980 NRHP CP-listed	4th Ave. & 17th St. North33.515314°N 86.812137°W	Birmingham, Alabama	Seven-story Renaissance Revival style building "designed by black architects and built by a black-owned construction firm, it served as the principal social and cultural center for the black community during segregation and housed the state headquarters for the Masons and the Order of the Eastern Star." Included in Fourth Avenue Historic District.
4	Woodlawn Masonic Building		1915 built 1991 NRHP CP-listed	5502 1st Avenue North33.539970°N 86.753059°W	Birmingham, Alabama	Three-story brown brick building with corbelled cornice, included in Woodlawn Commercial Historic District.
5	Dale Masonic Lodge		1848 built	Broad St. and Clifton St.31.993429°N 87.291374°W	Camden, Alabama	Greek Revival in style
6	Crane Hill Masonic Lodge		1904 built 2001 NRHP-listed	14538 Cty. Rd. 222; 34°5′49″N 87°2′38″W	Crane Hill, Alabama	Historically used as a meeting hall, as a school, as a multiple dwelling, and as a department store.
7	Tuckabatcha Masonic Lodge, a.k.a. Crawford Masonic Lodge F&AM #863			32.45624°N 85.18914°W	Crawford, Russell County, Alabama	Surveyed by Historic American Buildings Survey.
8	Masonic Temple (Eufaula, Alabama)		1872 built 1986 NRHP CP	227 E. Broad St. 31.89273°N 85.14287°W	Eufaula, Alabama	Contributing in the Lore Historic District.
9	Masonic Temple (Foley, Alabama)		c.1925 built 2005 CP NRHP-listed	200 North Alston Street; 30.407703°N 87.684707°W	Foley, Alabama	Mission Revival style; designed by Mobile architect George B. Rogers; included in Foley Downtown Historic District
10	Helion Lodge		1911 built	34°43′49″N 86°34′53″W	Huntsville, Alabama	"Birthplace of Freemasonry in Alabama"; home of the oldest Freemasons' lodge in Alabama, which erected this building to replace a previous one.
11	Scottish Rite Temple		1922 built 1984 NRHP-listed	351 St. Francis Street; 30°41′28.51″N 88°2′46.07″W	Mobile, Alabama	Egyptian Revival building known previously as Scottish Rite Temple, this building housed a Scottish Rite chapter. It has been sold and converted into a banqueting venue known as "The Temple Downtown.
12	Perdue Hill Masonic Lodge			31.51677°N 87.49697°W	Perdue Hill, Alabama	LaFayette visited here. It was moved to Perdue Hill from Claiborne, Alabama, which is now a ghost town.
13	Central Masonic Institute		1847 built 1975 NRHP-listed	109 Union St. 32°24′18″N 87°1′33″W	Selma, Alabama	Built in Greek Revival style in 1847 as the Central Masonic Institute, a school for orphans and the children of indigent Masons. Converted to many other uses during its history; now a museum.
14	St. Stephens Masonic Lodge, aka "Old Washington County Courthouse"		1853-54 built 1997 NRHP-listed	31°32′24″N 88°3′15″W	St. Stephens, Alabama	Greek Revival; main original function was as the Washington County Courthouse.

(compare to 14 in Category:Masonic buildings in Alabama)

=== Alaska ===
	Building	Image	Dates	Location	City, State	Description
1	Masonic Temple		1908 built 1980 NRHP-listed	809 1st Ave. 64°50′39″N 147°43′36″W	Fairbanks, Alaska	Masons purchased the building in 1908 and renovated to add a second story for lodge rooms and a main hall, in "Eclectic Renaissance Revival" style.

=== Arizona ===
	Building	Image	Dates	Location	City, State	Description
1	Masonic Temple/Hanna Building		1912 built 1987 NRHP CP	192 N. Broad Street; 33.39666°N 110.78725°W	Globe, Arizona	Classical Revival, in Globe Downtown Historic District. Houses Masonic Lodge #3, established in 1881. Stores and shops in street level and meeting rooms on upper floors
2	Masonic Temple (Kingman, Arizona)		1939 built 1986 NRHP-listed	212 N. Fourth St. 35°11′24″N 114°3′7″W	Kingman, Arizona	A WPA Moderne building built as a Masonic hall in 1939.
3	El Zaribah Shrine Auditorium		1921 built 1989 NRHP-listed	1502 W. Washington St. 33°26′55″N 112°5′31″W	Phoenix, Arizona	The original "El Zaribah Shrine Auditorium", although a successor building elsewhere is now named that. Designed by Clinton Campbell and Lescher & Mahoney in a mix of Exotic Revival style and Moorish Revival style. The building has served as home of the Arizona Centennial Museum and later there were plans to develop it as a different museum.
4	Phoenix Masonic Temple		1926 built Phoenix Historic Property Register-listed	Monroe and Fourth Ave. 33.450130°N 112.078602°W	Phoenix, Arizona	Designed by F.C. Hurst. First permanent home of Lodge #2, originally established in 1879.
5	Masonic Temple (Prescott, Arizona)		1907 built 1978 HD NRHP-listed	105-107 N. Cortez; 34.542233°N 112.468426°W	Prescott, Arizona	Three-story 50 by 95 feet (15 m × 29 m) building with colossal columns, pilasters, and pediment.
6	Schieffelin Hall		1881 built 1962 NHL CP; 1966 NRHP CP	402 E. Fremont St. 31.71388°N 110.06646°W	Tombstone, Arizona	Since 1881 home of King Solomon Lodge No. 5 Territorial Lodge, Free and Accepted Masons (F&AM) Included in Tombstone Historic District. Claimed to be "Built in 1881, this is the largest standing adobe bldg in the United States."
7	Masonic Hall (Wickenburg, Arizona)		1922 built 1986 NRHP-listed	108 Tegner; 33°58′9″N 112°43′46″W	Wickenburg, Arizona	Constructed with Mission/Spanish Revival architecture as a Masonic meeting hall, subsequently sold and converted to retail space (as a Montgomery Ward department store) Building has been demolished by 2018.
8	Masonic Temple (Yuma, Arizona)		1931 built 1984 NRHP-listed	153 S. 2nd Ave. 32°43′29″N 114°37′18″W	Yuma, Arizona	Built in 1931 in Moderne architecture style.

(compare to 7 in Category:Masonic buildings in Arizona)

=== Arkansas ===
	Building	Image	Dates	Location	City, State	Description
1	Farmers and Merchants Bank-Masonic Lodge		1906 built 1993 NRHP-listed	288 N. Broadway; 35°8′24″N 93°55′17″W	Booneville, Arkansas	Originally planned as a commercial building to house the Farmers and Merchants Bank, when the plans were announced, two Masonic lodges joined with the bank to add a meeting hall on the second floor. The building continued to house the bank after the lodges moved out. The building is noted for it Colonial Revival and Early Commercial architecture. CHECK THIS:
2	Bradford City Hall-Byers Masonic Lodge		1934 built 1999 NRHP-listed	302 W. Walnut St. 35°25′27″N 91°27′19″W	Bradford, Arkansas	Bungalow/Craftsman architecture The $1,574 cost of the building was shared by Byers Masonic Lodge and the Bradford city government.
3	Yell Masonic Lodge Hall		1876 built 1984 NRHP-listed	Off AR 68; 36°15′47″N 93°19′18″W	Carrollton, Arkansas	
4	Chester Masonic Lodge and Community Building		1942 built 2000 NRHP-listed	Jct. of Front and Dickson Sts. 35°40′51″N 94°10′34″W	Chester, Arkansas	Purpose-built as a Masonic Hall, it was constructed using materials from both a school and a previous Masonic Hall. Plain traditional style
5	Lee's Chapel Church and Masonic Hall		1946 built 2001 NRHP-listed	Near Cushman; 35°54′9″N 91°38′32″W	Cushman, Arkansas	Plain-Traditional style Built as a joint project of the Lee's Chapel Methodist Church and Montgomery Lodge No. 360.
6	Masonic Temple (El Dorado, Arkansas)		1924 built 2001 NRHP-listed	106-108 N. Washington; 33°12′44″N 92°39′49″W	El Dorado, Arkansas	Built in 1924 in Art Deco and revival architectural styles. It was constructed jointly and shared by Lee's Chapel Methodist Church and Montgomery Lodge No. 360. The lodge subsequently moved to Cave City.
7	Fort Smith Masonic Temple		1929 built 1992 NRHP-listed	200 N. 11th St. 35°23′9″N 94°25′6″W	Fort Smith, Arkansas	Includes Art Deco, Exotic Revival, Egyptian Revival architecture.
8	County Line School and Lodge		c.1879 built 1975 NRHP-listed	36°29′13″N 92°9′0″W	Near Gepp, Arkansas	Intended to straddle the Fulton vs. Baxter county line, near the small community of Gepp. School on first floor operated to 1948; County Line Masonic Lodge above.
9	Hampton Masonic Lodge Building		1920 built 2008 NRHP-listed	115 S. 2nd St. 33.537595°N 92.471544°W	Hampton, Arkansas	Early Commercial style. Built as a commercial building, the Hampton Masonic Lodge was the first tenant in the upstairs space. The upstairs space was later used by the Farmers Home Administration and several mercantile establishments before being acquired by the county for use as a public library.
10	Knob School-Masonic Lodge		1923 built 1991 NRHP-listed	AR 141; 36°16′53″N 90°27′0″W	Knob, Arkansas	Built with first floor to serve as a school, second floor as Masonic lodge hall, in vernacular Craftsman style,
11	Mount Moriah Masonic Lodge No. 18		1858 built 1987 NRHP-listed	Off AR 172; 33°16′18″N 92°49′36″W	Lisbon, Arkansas	Built in 1858. Purpose-built to be a Masonic hall, and still used as such, the Historic Preservation Alliance of Arkansas believes it may be the oldest building in the state still used for its original purpose by its original owner.
12	Elizabeth Lodge 215 A & F M		1867 built 1976 NRHP-listed	Off Highway 22; 35°17′3″N 93°24′32″W	New Blaine, Arkansas	Wood-frame structure from 1867, that, in 1976, still served Masonic group. Has been described as "one of the finest remaining rural structures erected in nineteenth-century Arkansas."
13	Masonic Temple (Pine Bluff, Arkansas)		1902 built 1978 NRHP-listed	4th and State St. 34°13′35″N 92°0′9″W	Pine Bluff, Arkansas	NRHP-listed for its architecture and its representation of social history. Purpose-built in a Neoclassical style to house an African American Masonic order.
14	B.H. Harrison Masonic Temple		1903 built 2018 NRHP CP	112 N. Mock St. 35°58′34″N 94°19′2″W	Prairie Grove, Arkansas	Included in North Mock Street Historic District, has pressed metal storefront with Classical features.
15	Russellville Masonic Temple		1926 built 2005 NRHP-listed	205 S. Commerce; 35°16′39″N 93°8′7″W	Russellville, Arkansas	Classical Revival Built as a Masonic Temple with the first floor rented to the city for use as the city Hall. In 1943 the city bought the building, paid off the mortgage and rented the second floor to the Masons.
16	Eastern Star Lodge 207 F&AM		1947 built 2002 NRHP-listed	36°27′05″N 90°10′31″W	St. Francis, Arkansas	Plain-Traditional concrete block building, was first purpose-built home of the local Masonic lodge.
17	Shiloh Church (Springdale, Arkansas)		1870 built 1975 NRHP; 1978 NRHP CP	Huntsville and Main Sts. 36°11′17″N 94°7′52″W	Springdale, Arkansas	Greek Revival architecture church. It is a two-story wood-frame structure, finished with wooden clapboards and topped by a gable roof with a small belfry. Decoration is relatively plain, with pilastered corners, a plain entablature along the side walls, and transom windows above the pair of entrances on the main facade. Built in 1870, it is the oldest surviving building in Springdale. It was used for many years as both a church (by multiple denominations) and the local Masonic lodge. By the late 1920s it had been abandoned by all of these users, and was acquired in 1932 by the local chapter of the International Order of Odd Fellows (IOOF), which used it as its lodge. The IOOF chapter deeded the building to the city in 2005.

(compare to 17 in Category:Masonic buildings in Arkansas)

=== California ===
Masons in California grew from 258 members in 1850 to over 63,000 in 1918, declining to 46,000 in 2019.

	Building	Image	Dates	Location	City, State	Description	
1	Masonic Temple and Lodge (Alameda, California)		1890 built 1982 NRHP-listed	1329-31 Park St. and 2312 Alameda Ave. 37°45′48″N 122°14′34″W	Alameda, California	Mission/Spanish Revival, Victorian Eclectic	
2	Auburn Masonic Temple (Auburn, California)		1914-1915 built 2011 NRHP-listed	948 Lincoln Way; 38.89892°N 121.07088°W	Auburn, California	Beaux-Arts style, built in 1914–1915	
3	Old Masonic Hall (Benicia, California)		1850 built 1972 NRHP-listed	106 W. J St. 38°3′9″N 122°9′24″W	Benicia, California	The oldest purpose built Masonic Hall in California. The building was sold by the Masons in 1887, but was reacquired and refurbished for Masonic use in 1950. NRHP-listed	
4	Masonic Temple (Berkeley, California)		1905 built 1982 NRHP-listed	2105 Bancroft Way and 2295 Shattuck Ave. 37°52′5″N 122°15′58″W	Berkeley, California	Classical Revival style, built in 1905. The upper floors were later used by University of California, Berkeley.	
5	Masonic Temple (Ferndale, California)		1891 built NRHP-C-listed 1994	212 Francis; 40°34′30.77″N 124°15′55.53″W	Ferndale, California	Eastlake-Stick architecture built in 1891. It is used as a Masonic Hall. Contributing building in NRHP-listed Ferndale Main Street Historic District	
6	Masonic Temple (Fullerton, California)		1920 built 1995 NRHP-listed	501 N. Harbor Blvd. 33°52′27″N 117°55′25″W	Fullerton, California	Built in Mission/Spanish Revival style. This was the second Masonic meeting hall in Fullerton. Due to declining membership and rising costs, the Masons sold the building in 1993, and it has been converted into the Spring Field Banquet Center, a commercial banquet hall and reception center.	
7	Brewster Building		1882 built 2000 NRHP	201 4th St., Galt, California	coordinates = 38°15′13″N 121°21′42″W	Galt, California	Italianate commercial originally with Masonic group upstairs.
8	Masonic Temple		c.1908 built 1992 CP NRHP-listed	355 San Benito St. 36.852707°N 121.401761°W	Hollister, California	Prominent contributing building in Downtown Hollister Historic District, with a domed cupola.	
9	Hornitos Masonic Hall No. 98		1855 built 2005 NRHP-listed	2877 Bear Valley Rd. 37°30′5″N 120°14′14″W	Hornitos, California	Mid 19th Century Revival style During the first twenty years of its existence, the building served many different purposes, operating as a photography studio, a jewelry and watch store, tailor shop and finally as the Fashion Saloon. It was purchased by Masons in August 1873 for $220, and they renovated it for use as a Masonic Hall. Sometime in early 1875, the Masons began holding regular meetings in the building and have occupied it ever since.	
10	Masonic Temple (Long Beach, California)		1903 built 19__ Long Beach-listed	230 Pine Ave. 33°46′11″N 118°11′32″W	Long Beach, California	Listed on the List of City of Long Beach historic landmarks It is "one of the last remaining examples of eminent local architect Henry Starbuck, who designed many of the city's turn-of-the-century buildings." It was renovated and restored in the 1980s, and was remodelled in the 1990s for use by Z Gallerie, a store.	
11	Masonic Temple (Marysville, California)		1864 dedicated	N.E. corner of Third and East Streets; 39.138°N 121.590°W	Marysville, California		
12	Scottish Rite Cathedral (Long Beach, California)		1926 built 1980 Long Beach-listed	855 Elm Ave. 33°46′39″N 118°11′17″W	Long Beach, California	Romanesque Revival; a Long Beach Historic Landmark	
13	Hollywood Masonic Temple		1921 built 1985 NRHP-listed	6840 Hollywood Blvd., in Hollywood neighborhood 34°6′4.73″N 118°20′24.5″W	Los Angeles, California	John C. Austin-designed, Classical Revival style	
12	Highland Park Masonic Temple		19__ built 1990 NRHP-listed	104 N. Avenue 56, in Highland Park neighborhood 34°6′33″N 118°11′40.2″W	Los Angeles, California	Mission/Spanish Revival style	
13	Prince Hall Masonic Temple		19__ built 2009 NRHP-listed	1050 E. 50th St., South Los Angeles; 33°59′50.53″N 118°15′26″W	Los Angeles, California		
14	Scottish Rite Masonic Temple (Los Angeles)			Wilshire Boulevard; 34.062167°N 118.323534°W	Los Angeles, California	Scottish Rite Masonic Temple Los Angeles. Later became the Marciano Art Foundation Pavilions.	
15	Shrine Auditorium		1925 built 1987 NRHP-listed	665 W. Jefferson Blvd. 34°1′23.55″N 118°16′53.55″W	Los Angeles, California	Moorish Revival style; built by Al Malaikah Temple of the Ancient Arabic Order of Mystics of the Noble Shrine.	
16	Masonic Hall (Mendocino, California)		1866 built 1971 NRHP-CP-listed	10500 Lansing Street; 39°18′24″N 123°47′55″W	Mendocino, California	Built of redwood, including a unique redwood sculpture crowning its cupola	
17	Scottish Rite Cathedral (Pasadena, California)		1925 built	150 N. Madison Ave. 34.14862°N 118.13804°W-->	Pasadena, California	Deemed NRHP-eligible but not NRHP-listed	
18	Masonic Building		1882 built 1995 CP-listed	43-49 Petaluma Blvd. N., 7/9 Western Ave. 38.23382°N 122.64047°W	Petaluma, California	Brick building with cast iron detailing, Italianate in style, included in Petaluma Historic Commercial District.	
19	Masonic Temple (Riverside, California)		1908 built 1980 NRHP-listed	3650 11th St. 33°58′43″N 117°22′30″W	Riverside, California	Built in Classical Revival style in 1908.	
20	Sacramento Masonic Temple		1920 built 2001 NRHP-listed	1131 J St. 38°34′55″N 121°29′27″W	Sacramento, California	Beaux-Arts and Renaissance style	
21	Nob Hill Masonic Center		1958 built	1111 California Street; 37.79132°N 122.41306°W	San Francisco, California	Albert Roller-designed, features huge exterior and interior artwork by Monterey artist Emile Norman. Home to the Masonic Grand Lodge of California and also used as a concert venue by Live Nation with over 3,000 seats	
22	Scottish Rite Masonic Center (San Francisco, California)			2850 19th Avenue; 37.73524°N 122.47473°W	San Francisco, California		
23	Texas Lodge Masonic Hall		1869 built	CA-299; 40.59863°N 122.49100°W	San Juan Bautista, California	Texas Lodge No. 46 F. & A. M. was founded by Edward Farris Storey and first met in 1854.	
24	Shasta Masonic Hall, or Western Star Lodge No. 2 - F & A.M.		1971 CP NRHP-listed	CA-299; 40.59863°N 122.49100°W	Shasta, California	Two-story brick building, included in NRHP-listed Shasta State Historic Park.	
25	Suisun Masonic Lodge No. 55		1855 built 1978 NRHP-listed	623 Main St. 38°14′17″N 122°2′22″W	Suisun City, California	NRHP-listed	
26	Molino Lodge Building		1980 NRHP-listed	3rd and C Sts. 40.0275°N 122.111944°W	Tehama		
27	Masonic Temple-Naval Lodge No. 87, Free and Accepted Masons		1918 built 2013 NRHP-listed	Marin & Virginia Sts. 38.102348°N 122.256932°W	Vallejo, California	Maybe also called "Vallejo Masonic Temple"? (this table entry was changed from NRHP name, "Masonic Temple-Naval Lodge No. 87, Free and Accepted Masons". Now Temple Art Lofts?	
28	Wheatland Masonic Temple		1898 built 1993 NRHP-listed	400 Front St. 39°0′40″N 121°25′20″W	Wheatland, California	Classical Revival style. Until 1948 the upper floor meeting rooms were used jointly by the Independent Order of Odd Fellows and the Freemasons. In 1948 the Masons bought out the Odd Fellows.	
29	Windsor Masonic Temple		1898 built	371 Windsor River Road; 38.547423°N 122.816315°W	Windsor, California	Burned in 1905, severely damaged in 1906 San Francisco earthquake. Now a Windsor historical landmark.	
30	Woodbridge Masonic Lodge No. 131		1882 built 1989 NRHP-listed	1040 Augusta St. 38°9′14″N 121°18′3″W	Woodbridge, California	Gothic style	
31	Ionic Masonic Center		1950 built	1122 South La Cienega Blvd. 34.0561493°N 118.3758501°W	Los Angeles, California		
32	Elysian Masonic Temple	Elysian Masonic Temple	Opened 1959	1900 N. Vermont Ave., Los Angeles, CA 90027; 34°06′21.6″N 118°17′29.2″W	Los Angeles, California	Home to the Elysian Masonic Lodge #418 F&AM, Elysian Masonic Temple is a 13,000 square foot building situated on about an acre of land in the heart of Los Angeles in the Los Feliz neighborhood. Opened in 1959	

(compare to 24 in Category:Masonic buildings in California)

=== Colorado ===
	Building	Image	Dates	Location	City, State	Description
1	Alamosa Masonic Hall		1887 built	37.46799°N 105.86685°W	Alamosa, Colorado	
2	Colorado Consistory No. 1		1925 built	39.3027°N 105.2029°W	Denver, Colorado	Consistory located near the state capitol in downtown Denver
3	First National Bank of Douglas County		1904 built 1995 NRHP	300 Wilcox St. 39.37243°N 104.85974°W	Castle Rock, Colorado	Also known as Masonic Building, designed George Louis Bettcher
4	Masonic Temple Building (Denver, Colorado)		1889 built 1977 NRHP-listed	1614 Welton St. 39°44′40″N 104°59′25″W	Denver, Colorado	Richardsonian Romanesque style building from 1889
5	Highlands Masonic Lodge		1905 built 1995 NRHP-listed	3220 Federal Blvd. 39°45′45″N 105°1′27″W	Denver, Colorado	Classical Revival Sold by the Masons in 1927 and now privately owned.
6	Mosque of the El Jebel Shrine		1907 built 1997 NRHP-listed	1770 Sherman St. 39°44′41″N 104°59′2″W	Denver, Colorado	Late 19th and 20th Century Revivals, Moorish Revival;Egyptian Revival Originally constructed as a meeting hall for the Shriners, it was sold it to the Scottish Rite in 1924. In 1995 it was sold again, and was operated for a time as an events center.
7	Fort Collins Masonic Temple		1903 built	Oak and Howes Streets; 40.585241°N 105.080308°W	Fort Collins, Colorado	Designed by William N. Bowman
8	Greeley Masonic Temple		1927 built 2004 NRHP-listed	829 10th Ave. 40°25′27″N 104°41′39″W	Greeley, Colorado	Colonial Revival building
9	American Federation of Human Rights Headquarters		1924 built 1998 NRHP-listed	9070 S. Douglas Blvd. 39°13′44″N 104°53′15″W	Larkspur, Colorado	Co-Masonry building associated with Italian-Americans and, egads, women!
10	Montrose Masonic Temple, Lodge No. 63		1911 built 2004 NRHP-listed	509-513 E. Main St. 38°28′51″N 107°52′29″W	Montrose, Colorado	A Classical Revival building from 1911
11	Nevadaville Masonic Temple		1861 built	1043 Nevadaville Road; 39°47′45″N 105°32′4″W	Nevadaville, Colorado	Western Neoclassical architecture building, serving as Colorado's only ghost town Masonic lodge
12	Mechanics Building/Masonic Building		1891 built 1983 NRHP-listed	207-211 N. Main St. 38°16′9″N 104°36′30″W	Pueblo, Colorado	A Late Victorian building from 1891
13	Springfield Masonic Temple		1889 built 1977 NRHP-listed	location = 281 W. 7th Ave. 37°24′25.58″N 102°37′8.01″W	Springfield, Colorado	Former schoolhouse taken over by Masons in early 1920s.
14	Masonic Temple		1911 built 1973 NRHP CP	location = 132 E. Main St. 37.16866°N 104.50487°W	Trinidad, Colorado	Also known as Colorado Building, included in Corazon de Trinidad, NRHP-listed in 1973.

(compare to 10 in Category:Masonic buildings in Colorado)

=== Connecticut ===
	Building	Image	Dates	Location	City, State	Description
1	Isaac Mead Building		1878 built 1988 NRHP-contributing	2-8 Greenwich Ave. (6 West Putnam)	Greenwich, Connecticut	Brick Tudor Revival-style building, home of the Acacia Lodge No. 85 during much of the second half of the 1800s. Included in Greenwich Avenue Historic District.
2	Brainerd Academy building		1839 built 1929 portico 1989 NRHP-contributing		Haddam, Connecticut	Greek Revival, included as contributing building in Haddam Center Historic District. Served for a while as an auxiliary town hall.
3	Prince Hall Grand Lodge of Masons		1864 built 1979 NRHP-listed	106 Goffe St. 41°18′56″N 72°56′06″W	New Haven, Connecticut	Prince Hall Freemasonry lodge after serving as a school for "Colored Children" from 1864 to 1874.
4	Masonic Temple (New Britain, Connecticut)		1927 built 1995 NRHP-listed	265 W. Main St. 41°39′57″N 72°47′27″W	New Britain, Connecticut	Beaux Arts building, built in 1929 as a Masonic hall. Sold by the Masons in 1940 and converted to use as a Jewish synagogue, Temple B'Nai Israel.
5	Masonic Temple of New Haven		1926 built 1989 NRHP CP-listed	285 Whitney Avenue	New Haven, Connecticut	Built in 1926, this temple is owned by 11 different lodges. Hiram #1, the first lodge chartered in 1750 in CT, meets here. The building is a brick three-story Classical Revival flat-roofed structure, a contributing resource in the NRHP-listed Whitney Avenue Historic District.
6	Westville Masonic Temple		1926 built 2003 CP-listed	949 Whalley Avenue; 41°19′41.81″N 72°57′38.48″W	New Haven, Connecticut	Built in 1926, a contributing building in the Westville Village Historic District listed on the National Register of Historic Places. In 2005 the building was sold and extensively renovated as a Scientology church.
7	King Solomon's Lodge No. 7 King Solomon's Lodge (Masonic Temple)		1834 built 1975 south hall added	Main St. South 41°32'11.2"N 73°12'23.5"W	Woodbury, Connecticut	Greek Revival, perched atop "Drum Rock" on Main Street South. Documented by the Historic American Buildings Survey.

(compare to 3 in Category:Masonic buildings in Connecticut)

=== Delaware ===
	Building	Image	Dates	Location	City, State	Description
1	Newport Masonic Hall		1913 built 1993 NRHP-listed	112-114 E. Market St. 39°42′49″N 75°36′31″W	Newport, Delaware	It was designed to function as a lodge room and auditorium, with two commercial spaces on the ground floor. The building is in a restrained Colonial Revival style.
2	Grand Opera House (Wilmington, Delaware)		1871 built 1972 NRHP-listed	818 N Market St. 39°44′38″N 75°32′55″W	Wilmington, Delaware	Also known as Masonic Hall and Grand Theater. Designed by Thomas Dixon in Second Empire style, it has been argued to be "one of the finest remaining examples of 19th century cast iron architecture in America."
3	Temple Lodge No. 9 A.F. & A.M.		1972 NRHP-listed	127 Causey Avenue; 38.9115°N 75.4325°W	Milford, Delaware	Part of the South Milford Historic District

=== Florida ===
	Building	Image	Dates	Location	City, State	Description
1	Witherspoon Lodge of Free and Accepted Masons, No. 111		c.1921 built 2009 NRHP-listed	28°48′32″N 81°38′19″W	Mount Dora, Florida	Prince Hall lodge which also served as a school for African-American children.
2	Masonic Temple (Gainesville, Florida)		1908 built 1998 NRHP-listed	215 N. Main St. 29°39′12″N 82°19′30″W	Gainesville, Florida	Late 19th and 20th Century Revivals architecture
3	Masonic Temple (Jacksonville, Florida)		1901 - 1912 built 1980 NRHP-listed	410 Broad St. 30°19′51″N 81°39′52″W	Jacksonville, Florida	NRHP-listed The building serves as the headquarters of the Most Worshipful Union Grand Lodge of Florida and Belize (a Prince Hall Masonic Grand Lodge).
4	Masonic Temple of Citrus Lodge No. 118, F. and A.M.		1910 built 2010 NRHP-listed	111 West Main Street and 95 South Pine Avenue	Inverness, Florida	Neoclassical. Vacated by the Masons in 1965. The building was later renovated and known as the "Masonic Business Center".
4.5	Island Grove Masonic Lodge No. 125		built 2010 NRHP-listed	20114 Southeast 219 Avenue. 29.453333°N 82.106667°W	Island Grove, Florida	
5	Scottish Rite Masonic Center (Miami, Florida)		Built 1922–1924	471 N.W. 3rd St.	Miami, Florida	This Egyptian-themed building overlooking the Miami River, rises three stories, with a Ziggurat-shaped roof. Dedicated in 1924, the building was restored following 1992's Hurricane Andrew.
5	Shrine Building (Miami, Florida)		1924-1926 built	1401-1417 Biscayne Blvd.	Miami, Florida	Art Deco building from 1930 with Seminole Indian motifs, designed by Robert Law Weed. Also known as "Boulevard Shops" building. The second floor was occupied by the Shriners for thirteen years, from 1930 to 1943.
6	Masonic Temple No. 25		1928 built 1986 NRHP-listed	508 East Kennedy Boulevard; 27°56′54″N 82°27′4″W	Tampa, Florida	Mediterranean Revival with Beaux-Arts detail

(compare to 6 in Category:Masonic buildings in Florida)

=== Georgia ===
	Building	Image	Dates	Location	City, State	Description
1	Prince Hall Masonic Temple		1940 built 1977 NHL CP; 1980 NHS CP	330 Auburn Avenue; 33.7556°N 84.37680°W	Atlanta, Georgia	Headquarters of the Southern Christian Leadership Conference in the 1960s. contributing in the Martin Luther King Jr. National Historical Park
2	Masonic Lodge		1920 built 2005 CP-listed	20 West Main St.	Butler, Georgia	A two-story brick building with a parapet; it has limestone Art Deco elements at corners and in the beltcourse. It is the meeting hall for Fickling Lodge #129 F&AM, and a contributing building in Butler Downtown Historic District.
3	Chickamauga Lodge No. 221, Free and Accepted Masons, Prince Hall Affiliate		1924 built 2006 NRHP-listed	Near to Chickamauga; 34°51′24″N 85°18′19″W	Chickamauga, Georgia	NRHP-listed
4	Columbian Lodge No. 7 Free and Accepted Masons		1902 built 1980 NRHP-listed	101 12th St. 32°28′7″N 84°59′30″W	Columbus, Georgia	Sullivanesque, Chicago style building designed by T. Firth Lockwood.
5	Masonic Lodge (Cordele, Georgia)		1907 built 1996 NRHP CP-listed	31°58′05.05″N 83°46′57.84″W	Cordele, Georgia	Designed by T. Firth Lockwood, Sr., and included in Cordele Commercial Historic District.
6	Masonic Lodge No. 238		1915 built 1996 NRHP-listed	600 S. Hamilton St. 34°45′57″N 84°58′5″W	Dalton, Georgia	NRHP-listed Home of Dalton Lodge No. 238, Prince Hall Affiliation.
7	Pythagoras Lodge No. 41, Free and Accepted Masons		1924 built 1982 NRHP-listed	136 E. Ponce de Leon Ave. 33°46′32″N 84°17′47″W	Decatur, Georgia	Beaux Arts style
8	Masonic Lodge		c.1924 built 1989 CP NRHP-listed	NE corner Church & Price Sts. 33.750659°N 84.748335°W	Douglasville, Georgia	Brick home, in Douglasville Commercial Historic District, of Douglasville Lodge No. 289 F.A.M., which was organized by 1901.
9	Greene County Courthouse		1848-49 built 1980 NRHP-listed	Georgia Route 12	Greensboro, Georgia	Third floor of Greek Revival-style brick courthouse was built by and for the Masons, and was still in use as a Masonic hall in 1980.
10	The Old Masonic Lodge		1854 built 1970 NRHP-listed	Perry St. 33°57′8″N 83°59′21″W	Lawrenceville, Georgia	Also known as "Old Seminary Building"; includes Greek Revival, Federal styling Originally serving as a school building. Masons met there for more than a century. Later served as a Gwinnett History Museum.
11	Beulah Grove Lodge No. 372, Free and Accepted York Masons		1910 built 2010 NRHP-listed	2525 Old Lower River Rd., near Douglasville, Georgia; 33°42′24″N 84°39′29″W	Pleasant Grove, Georgia	A two-story wood building.
12	Masonic Temple		1912 built 1966 NHL CP; 1966 NRHP CP	341 Bull Street; 32.07310°N 81.09433°W	Savannah, Georgia	Designed by Freemason Hyman W. Witcover. Included in Savannah Historic District, in Jasper Ward. Now the Gryphon Tea Room.
13	Old Masonic Lodge		1899 built 1986 NRHP CP listed	321 South Main Street	Tifton, Georgia	Built as a meeting hall for Tifton Lodge No. 47. Contributing building to Tifton Commercial Historic District.

(compare to 0 in Category:Masonic buildings in Georgia (U.S. state))

=== Hawaii ===
	Building	Image	Dates	Location	City, State	Description
1	Hilo Masonic Lodge Hall-Bishop Trust Building		1908–1910 built 1994 NRHP-listed	Keawe and Waianuenue Streets; 19°43′33″N 155°5′17″W	Hilo, Hawaii	Renaissance Revival.

=== Idaho ===
	Building	Image	Dates	Location	City, State	Description
1	Salubria Lodge No. 31		1922 built 1990 NRHP-listed	85 W. Central St. 44.573110°N 116.676548°W	Cambridge, Idaho	
2	Coeur d'Alene Masonic Temple		1909 built 1978 NRHP-listed	525 Sherman Ave. 47°40′27″N 116°46′40″W	Coeur d'Alene, Idaho	Second Renaissance Revival architecture,
3	Hailey Masonic Lodge		1937 built 2008 NRHP-listed	100 S. 2nd Ave. 43°31′13.95″N 114°18′44.81″W	Hailey, Idaho	Built by a Mason from England; still a meetingplace in 2010.
4	Masonic Temple		1917 built 1996 CP NRHP-listed	100 N Coeur d'Alene Ave; 47°37′36″N 115°51′23″W	Harrison, Idaho	Brick building at left in photo, part of Harrison Commercial Historic District
5	Masonic Hall		1865 built 1975 NRHP CP		Idaho City, Idaho	Contributing in Idaho City Historic District.
6	Murray Masonic Hall		1884 built 1987 NRHP-listed	Main St. between Second and Third; 47°37′36″N 115°51′23″W	Murray, Idaho	Italianate architecture

(compare to 7 in Category:Masonic buildings in Idaho)

=== Illinois ===
	Building	Image	Dates	Location	City, State	Description
1	Masonic Temple (Aurora, Illinois)		1924 built 1982 NRHP-listed	104 S. Lincoln Ave. 41°45′12″N 88°18′46″W	Aurora, Illinois	Classical Revival
2	Masonic Temple (Chicago, Illinois)		1892 built 1939 demolished		Chicago, Illinois	A skyscraper built in 1892 that became the tallest building in Chicago in 1895. It was demolished in 1939. Designed by Burnham and Root.
3	Medinah Temple		1912 built	600 N. Wabash Avenue; 41°53′34″N 87°37′38″W	Chicago, Illinois	Built by architects Huehl and Schmidt in 1912
	Myrtle Masonic Temple Association	Myrtle Masonic Temple building after 2018 renovation to ERIS Brewery and Cider House.	1911 built 2018 renovated	4240 W. Irving Park Road	Chicago, Illinois	Architects: Hatzfeld & Knox Cornerstone laid in 1910, building completed in 1911. Operated as a Masonic Temple Association (chapters included Mayfair and Zenith) through 1981. 1981-2015 Bethel Korean Presbyterian Church Current owners are ERIS Brewery and Cider House, which opened in 2018.
4	New Masonic Building and Oriental Theater		1926 built 1978 NRHP-listed	24 & 32 W Randolph Street; 41°53′5″N 87°37′43″W	Chicago, Illinois	Designed by Rapp and Rapp in Late Gothic Revival and Art Deco style
5	Collinsville Masonic Lodge Hall		1912 built 2005 NRHP-listed	213 W. Clay St. 38°40′20″N 89°59′21″W	Collinsville, Illinois	Classical Revival
6	Masonic Temple Building (Maywood, Illinois)		1917 built 1992 NRHP-listed	200 S. 5th Ave. 41°53′9″N 87°50′22″W	Maywood, Illinois	Prairie School style, designed by Eben Ezra Roberts
7	Masonic Temple Building (Oak Park, Illinois)		1905 built 1982 NRHP-listed	119-137 N. Oak Park Ave. 41°53′17″N 87°47′41″W	Oak Park, Illinois	Prairie School style, designed by Eben Ezra Roberts
8	AF and AM Lodge 687		1896-1900 built 2003 NRHP-listed	203 West High Street; 42°28′6″N 89°38′52″W	Orangeville, Illinois	Italianate
9	Masonic Temple Lodge No. 420		c. 1900 built 2006 NRHP-CP-listed	628-628 S. Fourth St. 42°00′50.36″N 89°19′56.41″W	Oregon, Illinois	Contributing property in a historic district.
10	Scottish Rite Cathedral (Peoria, Illinois)		1924 built 1983 NRHP-CP-listed	400 NE Perry Ave. 40°41′53″N 89°35′22″W	Peoria, Illinois	Has stained-glass windows; contributing property in a historic district.
11	Sterling Masonic Temple		1900 built 1996 NRHP-listed	111-113 W. 3rd St. 41°47′16″N 89°41′52″W	Sterling, Illinois	NRHP-listed
12	Vermont Masonic Hall		1891 built 1988 NRHP-listed	N. Main St. 40°17′42″N 90°25′39″W	Vermont, Illinois	Includes Chicago, Gothic, and Commercial Style architecture

(compare to 8 in Category:Masonic buildings in Illinois)

=== Indiana ===
	Building	Image	Dates	Location	City, State	Description
1	Camden Masonic Temple		1902 built 2003 NRHP-listed	213 W. Main St. 40°36′31″N 86°32′26″W	Camden, Indiana	Romanesque architecture Mt. Zion Lodge No. 211 currently meets in the building. Also houses Retail shops, office and residential apartments.
2	Grand Masonic Lodge		1817 built 1973 NRHP-CP-listed	38°12′42″N 86°7′26″W	Corydon, Indiana	Built in 1817. Many Masons who were initial state leaders of Indiana met here. Included in Corydon Historic District which became NRHP-listed in 1973.
3	Masonic Temple (Evansville, Indiana)		1913 built 1982 NRHP-listed	301 Chestnut St. 37°58′7″N 87°34′11″W	Evansville, Indiana	Classical Revival
4	Masonic Temple (Fort Wayne, Indiana)		1926 built 1991 NRHP-listed	206 E. Washington Blvd. 41°4′39″N 85°8′55″W	Fort Wayne, Indiana	Classical Revival
5	Masonic Temple (Franklin, Indiana)		1922 built 1991 NRHP-listed	135 N. Main St. 39°28′55″N 86°3′17″W	Franklin, Indiana	Classical Revival building, now "Johnson County Museum of History", originally a Masonic temple constructed by Franklin Lodge No. 107
6	Indianapolis Masonic Temple		1908 built 2008 NRHP-listed	525 N. Illinois Ave. 39°46′38″N 86°9′33″W	Indianapolis, Indiana	Classical Revival building also known as Indiana Freemasons' Hall
7	Scottish Rite Cathedral (Indianapolis, Indiana)		1927 built 1983 NRHP-listed	Indianapolis, Indiana; 39°46′34.07″N 86°9′28.77″W	Indianapolis, Indiana	The world's largest Scottish Rite building; a Gothic structure that an international association of architects once labeled "one of the seven most beautiful buildings in the world."
8	Murat Shrine		1909 built		Indianapolis, Indiana	the largest Shrine Temple in the United States
9	F. & A.M. Tuscan Lodge No. 143		1913 built 2020 NRHP-listed	828 Washington St. 40°50′11″N 85°43′40″W	Lagro, Indiana	Included the Citizens State Bank and the Lagro Hardware Company
10	Schofield House		1817 built 1973 NRHP-CP-listed		Madison, Indiana	"birthplace of Freemasonry in Indiana", included in the Madison Historic District
11	Milan Masonic Lodge No. 31		1900 built 2013 NRHP-listed	312 Main St. 39°07′30″N 85°07′54″W	Milan, Indiana	Oldest continuously active Masonic lodge in Ripley County.
12	Masonic Temple (Muncie, Indiana)		1920 built 1984 NRHP-listed	520 E. Main St. 40°11′38″N 85°22′52″W	Muncie, Indiana	Late Gothic Revival architecture
13	Terre Haute Masonic Temple		1916 built 1995 NRHP-listed	224 North 8th Street. 40°11′38″N 85°22′52″W	Terre Haute, Indiana	Neoclassical Architecture

(compare to 12 in Category:Masonic buildings in Indiana)

=== Iowa ===
	Building	Image	Dates	Location	City, State	Description
1	Masonic Temple (Ames, Iowa)		1917 built 2016 NRHP-listed	413, 417, 427, 429 Douglas Ave. 42°01′32″N 93°36′44″W	Ames, Iowa	Neoclassical building commissioned by Wallace M. Greeley, a local banker and civic leader, at the high point of Progressive era construction in the central business district.
2	Champlin Memorial Masonic Temple		1907 built 1990 NRHP-listed	602 Story St. 42°3′44″N 93°52′45″W	Boone, Iowa	Chicago style / Commercial style architecture, designed by Proudfoot & Bird
3	Iowa Masonic Library and Museum		1955 built	813 First Ave. SE; 41°58′57.16″N 91°39′40.36″W	Cedar Rapids, Iowa	Library, museum and Grand Lodge administration building whose dedication is asserted to have been "the most important event in Iowa Masonry" during the 20th century"
4	Cedar Rapids Scottish Rite Temple		1927 built 1998 NRHP-listed	616 A Avenue N.E. 41°58′58″N 91°39′52″W	Cedar Rapids, Iowa	NRHP-listed as "Consistory Building No. 2".
5	Chariton Masonic Temple		1937 built 2006 NRHP-listed	821 Armory Ave. 41°0′51″N 93°18′24″W	Chariton, Iowa	Art Deco, designed by William L. Perkins
6	Masonic Temple of Des Moines		1913 built 1997 NRHP-listed	1011 Locust St. 41°35′9″N 93°37′47″W	Des Moines, Iowa	Beaux Arts architecture, designed by Proudfoot & Bird
7	Scottish Rite Consistory Building		1927 built 1983 NRHP-listed	6th Ave. and Park St. 41°35′29″N 93°37′30″W	Des Moines, Iowa	Neo-Classical
8	Masonic Temple Theater		1923 built 1991 NRHP-listed	115 N. Main; 40°58′2″N 91°33′11″W	Mount Pleasant, Iowa	Classical Revival
8.5	Masonic Temple		1920-21 built 2006 NRHP CP	317 E. 3rd Street	Muscatine, Iowa	Three-story brick building costing, with furnishings, more than $104,000, claimed to be the first Masonic lodge building in Iowa, a contributing building in Muscatine's Downtown Commercial Historic District.
9	Sioux City Masonic Temple		1922 built 2004 NRHP-listed	820 Nebraska St. 42°29′58″N 96°24′5″W	Sioux City, Iowa	Spanish Colonial Revival
10	Masonic Temple Building (Stuart, Iowa)		1894 built 1996 NRHP-listed	1311 N. 2nd St. 41°30′18″N 94°19′7″W	Stuart, Iowa	Romanesque, Colonial Revival
11	Waterloo Masonic Temple		1928 built 2013 NRHP-listed	325 E. Park Ave. 42°30′02″N 92°20′08.6″W	Waterloo, Iowa	Moorish or "Phoenician" Revival design by local architect and Mason John G. Ralston.
12	Masonic Opera House		1893 built 1973 NRHP-listed	201 Barnes St. 41°24′5″N 92°21′17″W	What Cheer, Iowa	Romanesque

(compare to 7 in Category:Masonic buildings in Iowa)

=== Kansas ===
	Building	Image	Dates	Location	City, State	Description
1	Union Implement and Hardware Building-Masonic Temple		1900 built 1988 NRHP-listed	121-123 W. Main; 37°13′23″N 95°42′27″W	Independence, Kansas	Romanesque.
2	Scottish Rite Temple (Kansas City, Kansas)		1908 built 1985 NRHP-listed	39°6′50″N 94°37′34″W	Kansas City, Kansas	NRHP-listed
3	Kansas City Scottish Rite Temple		1928-30 built		Kansas City, Kansas	
4	Masonic Temple (Salina, Kansas)		1927 built 2000 NRHP-listed	336 S. Santa Fe Ave. 38°50′5″N 97°36′33″W	Salina, Kansas	Classical Revival
5	Masonic Grand Lodge Building		2014 NRHP-listed	320 SW. 8th Ave. 39.0501°N 95.6784°W	Topeka	
6	Towanda Masonic Lodge No. 30 A.F. and A.M.		1904 built 2004 NRHP-listed	401 Main St. 37°47′44″N 97°0′9″W	Towanda, Kansas	Designed by T.R. Reed
7	Arkansas Valley Lodge No. 21, Prince Hall Masons		1910 built 1977 NRHP-listed	615 N. Main St. 37°41′44″N 97°20′17″W	Wichita, Kansas	Built in 1910 by a Prince Hall lodge which was chartered in 1885.
8	Scottish Rite Temple (Wichita, Kansas)		1887 built 1972 NRHP-listed	NW corner of 1st St. at Topeka; 37°41′18″N 97°20′3″W	Wichita, Kansas	Romanesque

(compare to 3 in Category:Masonic buildings in Kansas)

=== Kentucky ===
	Building	Image	Dates	Location	City, State	Description
1	Burnside Lodge		1910 built 1984 NRHP-listed	Off US 27; 36°59′13″N 84°36′03″W	Burnside, Kentucky	One-story brick building of lodge organized in 1887.
2	Cadiz Masonic Lodge No. 121 F. and A.M.		Built c.1854 1979 NRHP-listed	Jefferson and Monroe Sts. 36°51′45″N 87°50′16″W	Cadiz, Kentucky	Individually listed on NRHP and also included in Cadiz Downtown Historic District; has served as "Trigg County Historical Museum".
3	Ceralvo Masonic Hall and School		2015 NRHP-listed	942 Ceralvo Rd. 37°21′59″N 87°01′52″W	Centertown, Kentucky	
4	Beulah Lodge		1908 built 1989 NRHP-listed	Kentucky Route 70; 37°16′17″N 87°41′24″W	Dawson Springs, Kentucky	
5	Dundee Masonic Lodge No. 733		1902 built 2008 NRHP-listed	11640 KY 69 N. 37°33′25″N 86°46′22″W	Dundee, Kentucky	Built to serve as a Masonic lodge meeting place and as Methodist church.
6	Masonic Hall (Eastwood, Kentucky)		1852 built 1983 NRHP-listed	In or near Fisherville; 38°11′21″N 85°27′42″W	Eastwood, Kentucky	In the Fisherville neighborhood of Louisville.
7	Morrison Lodge		1913 built 1988 NRHP-listed	121 N. Mulberry St. 37°41′41″N 85°51′30″W	Elizabethtown, Kentucky	A fine Arts and Crafts-style three-story brick building for one of the first chartered (1823) Masonic lodges in Kentucky.
7.5	Hiram Lodge No. 4		1893 built 1979 NRHP CP	308 Ann Street, stone, [2]	Frankfort, Kentucky	Romanesque Revival in style; contributing in Frankfort Commercial Historic District.
8	Greenup Masonic Lodge		1867 built 1988 NRHP-listed	314 Main St. 38°34′40″N 82°50′12″W	Greenup, Kentucky	A three-story brick building.
9	Russell Lodge No. 284		1939 built 1994 NRHP-listed	Public Square; 36°59′3″N 85°3′48″W	Jamestown, Kentucky	A two-story stone building, also known as Jamestown Masonic Lodge.
10	Lewisport Masonic Lodge		1984 NRHP-listed	4th St. 37°56′11″N 86°54′07″W	Lewisport, Kentucky	Has pressed tin cornice and cast iron storefront.
11	Ancient and Accepted Scottish Rite Temple		1930 built 1982 NRHP-listed	200 E. Gray St. 38°14′48″N 85°45′46″W	Louisville, Kentucky	Classical Revival
12	Milton Masonic Lodge and County General Store		c.1875-99 built 1983 NRHP-listed	Main St. 38°43′29″N 85°22′08″W	Milton, Kentucky	Two-story three-bay brick building built for the Milton masonic lodge, and still serving in 1982.
13	Munfordville Presbyterian Church and Green River Lodge No. 88		1835 built 1980 NRHP-listed	3rd and Washington Sts. 37°16′17″N 85°53′32″W	Munfordville, Kentucky	
14	Masonic Temple (Paducah, Kentucky)		1904 built 2002 NRHP-listed	501-505 S. 7th St. 37°4′50″N 88°35′58″W	Paducah, Kentucky	Classical Revival
15	Masonic Widows and Orphans Home		2002 NRHP-listed	3701 Frankfort Ave. 38.255556°N 85.665000°W	St. Matthews, Kentucky	
16	Masonic Hall-Federal Commissary Building		1860 built 1998 NRHP-listed	near Smithland; 37°8′25″N 88°24′24″W	Smithland, Kentucky	Used by the Federal government during the American Civil War as a commissary.

(compare to 12 in Category:Masonic buildings in Kentucky)

=== Louisiana ===
	Building	Image	Dates	Location	City, State	Description
1	Masonic Building (Alexandria, Louisiana)		1927 built 1986 NRHP-listed	Fourth and Johnston Sts. 31°18′36″N 92°26′42″W	Alexandria, Louisiana	Classical Revival
2	Prince Hall Masonic Temple (Baton Rouge, Louisiana)		1924 built 1994 NRHP-listed	1335 North Blvd. 30°26′51″N 91°10′31″W	Baton Rouge, Louisiana	Classical Revival Originally constructed as an Odd Fellows lodge, the building was purchased by the Prince Hall Freemasons in 1948.
3	Liberty Lodge No. 123, F&AM		1880 built 1989 NRHP-listed	LA 172 and LA 5; 32°11′18″N 93°54′22″W	Keachi, Louisiana	Greek Revival
4	Hope Lodge No. 145		1916 built 1983 NRHP-listed	116 East Vermilion Street; 30.22388°N 92.0180393°W	Lafayette, Louisiana	Lodge was chartered in 1857. Current building from 1916 replaced original one.
5	Masonic Temple (Shreveport, Louisiana)		1937 built 1991 NRHP-listed	1805 Creswell St. 32°29′39″N 93°44′29″W	Shreveport, Louisiana	Moderne
6	Scottish Rite Cathedral (Shreveport, Louisiana)		1915 built 1986 NRHP-listed	725 Cotton St. 32°30′30″N 93°44′56″W	Shreveport, Louisiana	Beaux Arts

=== Maine ===
	Building	Image	Dates	Location	City, State	Description
1	Masonic Hall (Augusta, Maine)		1894 built 1986 NRHP-listed	313-321 Water St. 44°18′51″N 69°46′30″W	Augusta, Maine	Renaissance-style, designed by John Spofford
2	Masonic Temple (Belfast, Maine)		1877 built 1973 NRHP-listed	High St. (U.S. 1); 44°25′34″N 69°0′24″W	Belfast, Maine	
3	Masonic Hall (Guilford, Maine)		1916 built		Guilford, Maine	Built 1916. Demolished in 2000.
4	Kora Temple		1908 built 1975 NRHP-listed	11 Sabattus St. 44°6′1″N 70°12′53″W	Lewiston, Maine	Designed by George M. Coombs in Exotic Revival and/or Moorish style
5	Masonic Temple (Portland, Maine)		1911 built 1982 NRHP-listed	43°39′32″N 70°15′30″W	Portland, Maine	

=== Maryland ===
	Building	Image	Dates	Location	City, State	Description
1	Universal Lodge No. 14		1880 built 2008 NRHP-listed	38°58′54″N 76°29′49″W	Annapolis, Maryland	Two-story gable-front frame and concrete-block building with a brick veneer facade, constructed c. 1880 and substantially expanded in the mid-1950s.
2	Grand Lodge of Maryland Masonic Temple		1866 built	39°17′30.5″N 76°36′53.6″W	Baltimore, Maryland	
3	Glen Burnie Lodge		Began 1921. Member designed and built. Completed 1923.	39°9′46.9″N 76°37′34.2″W	Glen Burnie, Maryland	Two-story brick building, built circa 1923. Renovations in 1970's (interior) and 2015 (exterior). Recent renovations to interior in connection with Glen Burnie Lodge, No 213 Centennial (2021) include refurbished staircase, addition of new front doors, and new stained glass sign.

=== Massachusetts ===
Boston has been the site of several significant Masonic buildings.

In 1830, the Grand Lodge of Massachusetts bought land on the corner of Tremont Street and Turnagain Alley. A Temple was constructed on the site and dedicated in 1832, but initially could not be owned by the Grand Lodge because of legal limitations on the value of real estate that the Grand Lodge could hold. Turnagain Alley became Temple Place and the Temple School, established by Bronson Alcott, was housed there during the 1830s. The Temple also held a concert hall and was the site of many public lectures by Ralph Waldo Emerson, including his reading of The Transcendentalist in 1842. Masons used the Masonic Temple for meetings until 1858, when the building was sold to the U.S. government for use as a courthouse. The government sold the building in 1885 and it was remodeled into commercial space for the R. H. Stearns department store.

Beginning in 1859, Boston's Masons occupied a building at the corner of Tremont and Boylston Streets that was known as Winthrop House, and that was rededicated as "Freemason's Hall" in December 1859. That building was destroyed by fire in April 1864. A grand new Masonic Temple building, designed by Merrill G. Wheelock, was built in its place on the same site and dedicated in 1867. The second temple was also destroyed by fire in 1895 and replaced at the same location with a building designed by George F. Loring and Sanford Phipps, dedicated on December 27, 1899.

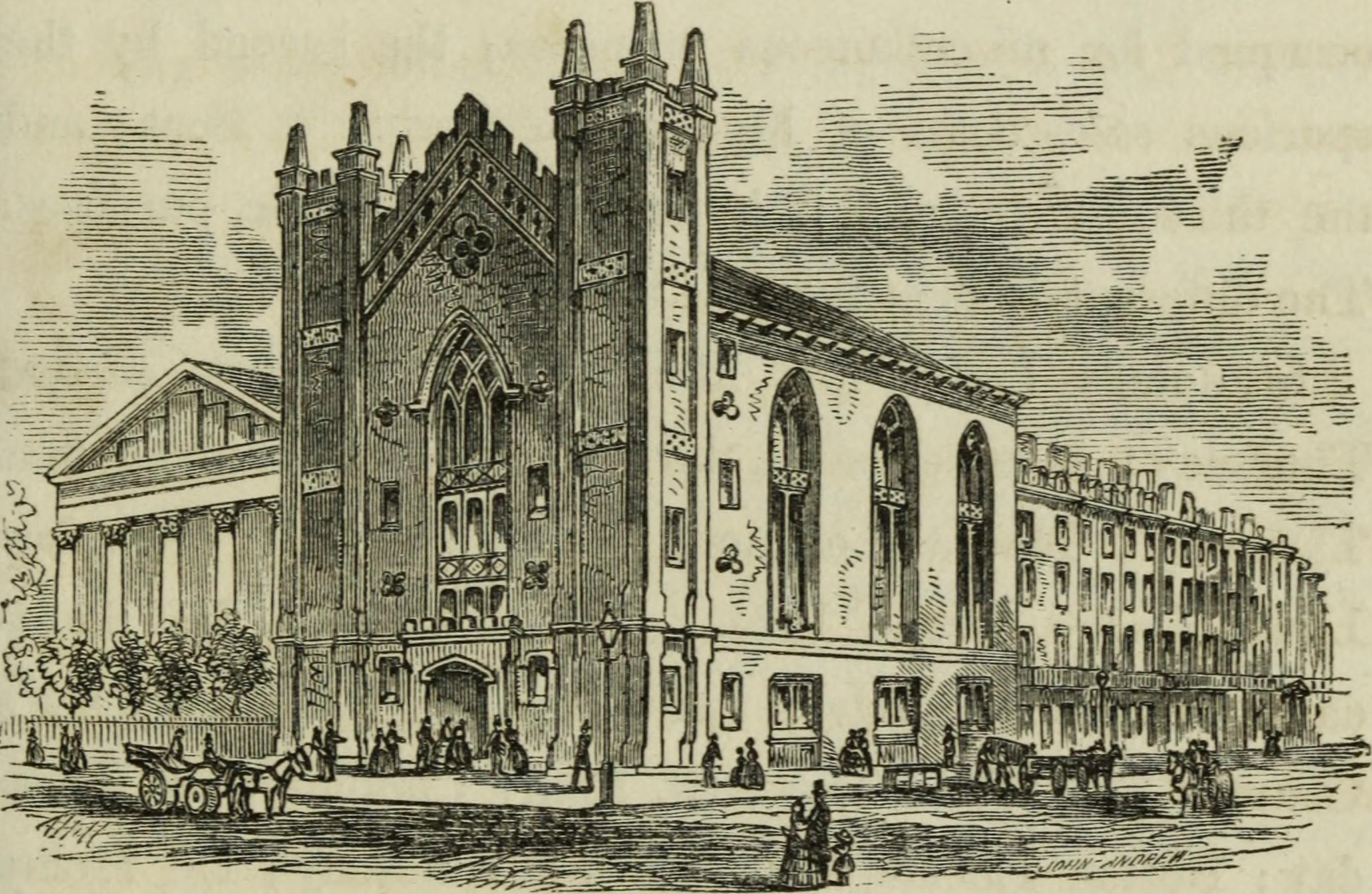
First Masonic Temple at Tremont St. and Temple Place, Boston, 1856. St. Paul's Church is on the left.

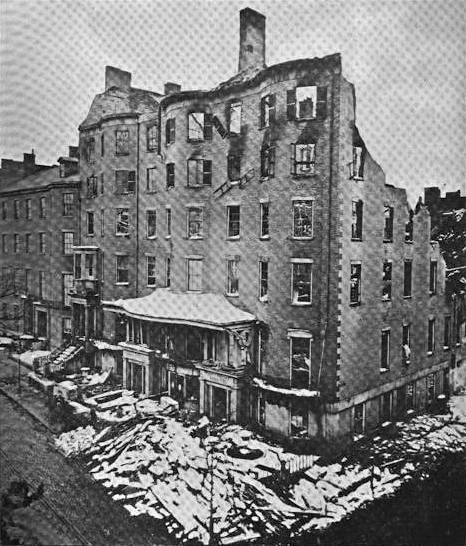
Winthrop House, Tremont St., Boston, after the fire, 1865

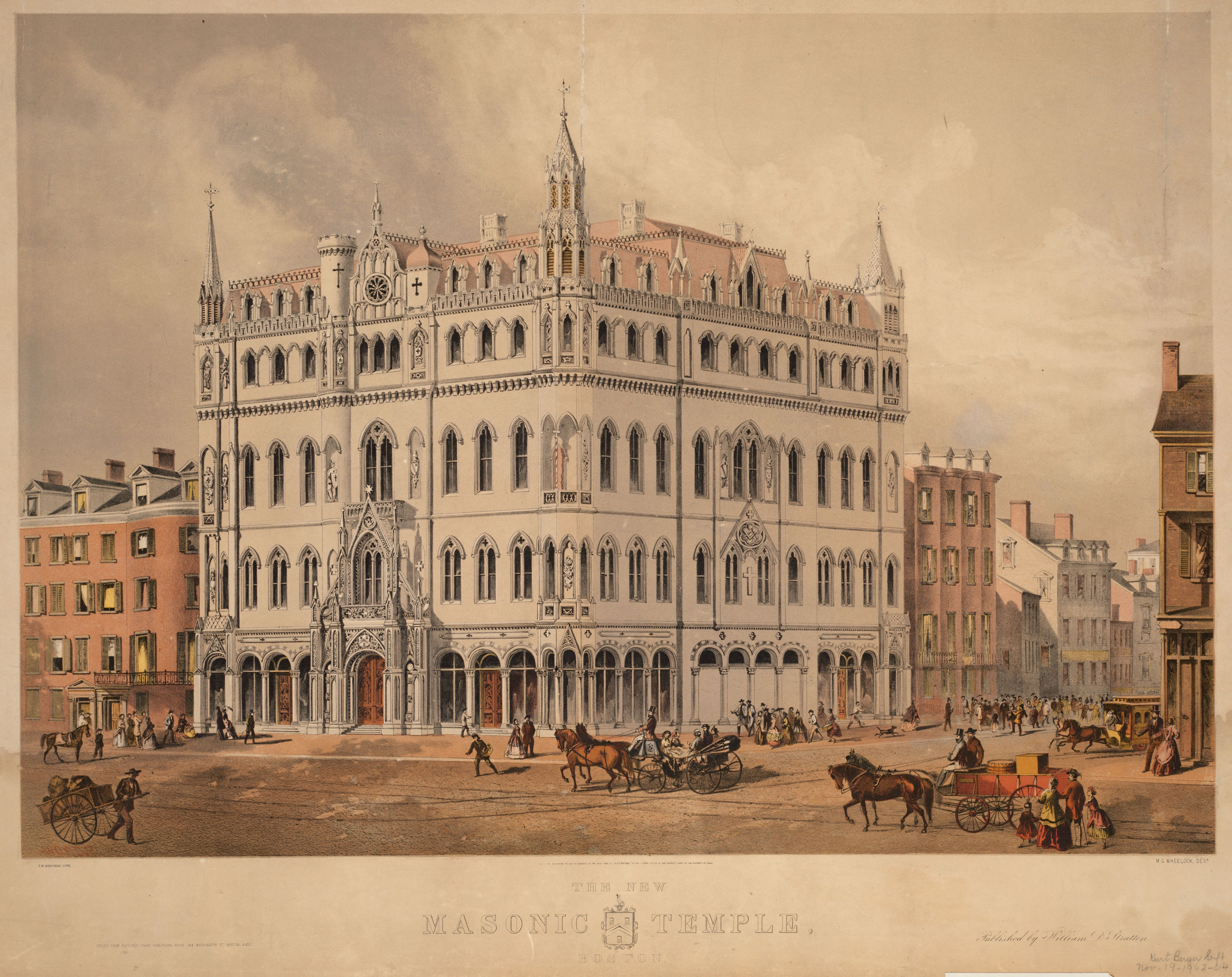
Second Masonic Temple on Tremont St., Boston, 1865

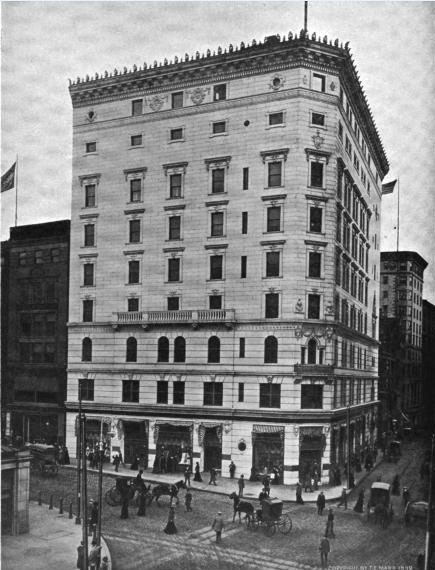
Third Masonic Temple on Tremont St., Boston, 1906

Also in Massachusetts:

	Building	Image	Dates	Location	City, State	Description
4	Lynn Masonic Hall		1880 built 1979 NRHP-listed	42°27′48″N 70°56′59″W	Lynn, Massachusetts	A Gothic-style building from 1880, NRHP-listed
5	Masonic Building (Newton, Massachusetts)		1896 built 1986 CP	296 to 304 Walnut Street & 456 to 460 Newtonville Avenue	Newton, Massachusetts	Part of Newtonville Historic District, which is NRHP-listed
6	Masonic Temple (Quincy, Massachusetts)		1926 built 1989 NRHP-listed	1170 Hancock St. 42°15′12.5″N 71°0′17″W	Quincy, Massachusetts	Classical Revival building from 1926
7	Masonic Block (Reading, Massachusetts)		1984 NRHP-listed	600-622 Main Street; 42°31′25″N 71°6′13″W	Reading, Massachusetts	Late 19th and 20th Century Revivals and other architecture
8	Masonic Temple (Springfield, Massachusetts)		1923 built 1983 NRHP-listed	339-341 State Street; 42°6′20″N 72°34′52″W	Springfield, Massachusetts	Classical Revival
9	Masonic Temple (Worcester, Massachusetts)		1914 built 1980 NRHP-listed	Ionic Ave. 42°15′29″N 71°48′21″W	Worcester, Massachusetts	Classical Revival
10	Masonic Hospital				Shrewsbury, Massachusetts	Former Whittall estate, Juniper Hall, donated to the Masons in 1927, in what is now Prospect Park. Ownership taken by the town of Shrewsbury in 1976; demolished in 1979.

(compare to 13 in Category:Masonic buildings in Massachusetts)

=== Michigan ===
	Building	Image	Dates	Location	City, State	Description
1	Bay City Masonic Temple		1890 built	700 N. Madison Ave. 43°35′49″N 83°53′4″W	Bay City, Michigan	Moorish Revival with Richardsonian Romanesque elements.
2	Masonic Temple Building (Cadillac, Michigan)		1889 built 1994 NRHP-listed	122-126 N. Mitchell St. 44°15′5″N 85°24′0″W	Cadillac, Michigan	A Romanesque building completed in 1889, designed by Sydney Osgood, NRHP-listed
3	Detroit Masonic Temple		1922 built 1980 CP-listed	500 Temple St. 42°20′29.11″N 83°3′36.56″W	Detroit, Michigan	Built in 1922 and NRHP-listed, this is the largest Masonic Temple in the world
3.5	Most Worshipful Prince Hall Grand Lodge of Michigan		1924 built 2022 NRHP	Gratiot Ave. & McDougall St.	Detroit, Michigan	Built in 1924 as Amaranth Lodge, acquired in 1951 by the state's Prince Hall Grand Lodge.
4	Masonic Temple Building (East Lansing, Michigan)		1916 built 1999 NRHP-listed	314 M.A.C. Ave. 42°44′10″N 84°28′49″W	East Lansing, Michigan	Classical Revival
5	Masonic Temple Building (Kalamazoo, Michigan)		1913 built 1980 NRHP-listed	309 N. Rose St. 42°17′38″N 85°35′6″W	Kalamazoo, Michigan	Italian Renaissance style
6	Masonic Temple Building (Lansing, Michigan)		1924 built 1980 NRHP-listed	217 S. Capitol Ave. 42°43′55″N 84°33′12″W	Lansing, Michigan	Classical Revival
7	Masonic Temple Building (Marshall, Michigan)		1913 built 1988 NRHP-listed	42°16′17″N 84°57′29″W	Marshall, Michigan	Late 19th and 20th Century Revivals, Italian Renaissance
8	Ye Olde Courthouse Masonic Hall		Built 1890; 1982 NRHP-listed	Central Ave. 44°2′50″N 83°51′14″W	Omer, Michigan	Built as a courthouse; served Masons from 1893 to 1997. Also known as "Omer Masonic Hall".
9	E.S. Swayze Drugstore/Otisville Mason Lodge No. 401		1874 built 1982 NRHP-listed	106 Main St. 43°10′0″N 83°31′27″W	Otisville, Michigan	Italianate
10	Masonic Temple (Port Hope, Michigan)		1867 built 1987 NRHP-listed	4425 Main St. 43°56′28″N 82°42′48″W	Port Hope, Michigan	Greek Revival
11	Port Sanilac Masonic and Town Hall		1884 built 1996 NRHP-listed	20 N. Ridge St. 43°25′53″N 82°32′31″W	Port Sanilac, Michigan	Italianate

(compare to 5 in Category:Masonic buildings in Michigan)

=== Minnesota ===
	Building	Image	Dates	Location	City, State	Description
1	Colonial Hall and Masonic Lodge No. 30		1922 built 1979 NRHP-listed	1900 3rd Ave., S. 45°11′49″N 93°23′11″W	Anoka, Minnesota	NRHP-listed
2	Clearwater Masonic and Grand Army of the Republic Hall		1888 built 1979 NRHP-listed	205–215 Oak Street; 45°25′18″N 94°2′57″W	Clearwater, Minnesota	Joint meeting hall shared with a Grand Army of the Republic post.
3	Duluth Masonic Center		1905 built 2015 NRHP-listed	4 W. 2nd Street; 46°47′16.5″N 92°6′1″W	Duluth, Minnesota	Longstanding focal point of Duluth's most influential fraternal organization, further noted for its collection of 80 original hand-painted stage backdrops.
4	Masonic Temple Delta Lodge No. 119		1917 built 1982 NRHP-listed	325 W. Main; 44°26′53″N 95°47′22″W	Marshall, Minnesota	Exotic Revival, Second Egyptian Revival
5	Minneapolis Masonic Temple		1888 built 1975 NRHP-listed	528 Hennepin Avenue. 44°58′46″N 93°16′24″W	Minneapolis, Minnesota	Richardsonian Romanesque Masonic Temple, built in 1888, now Hennepin Center for the Arts
6	Scottish Rite Temple		1906 built 1976 NRHP-listed	2011 Dupont Ave. S. 44°57′45″N 93°17′34″W	Minneapolis, Minnesota	Romanesque, built in 1894–1906 for use as a church (Fowler Methodist Episcopal Church) and converted for Masonic use in 1915.
7	Pleasant Grove Masonic Lodge		1868 built 1980 NRHP-listed	Near Stewartsville; 43°52′12″N 92°23′4″W	Stewartville, Minnesota	NRHP-listed
8	Triune Masonic Temple		1910 built 1980 NRHP-listed	1898 Iglehart Avenue; 44°56′57″N 93°10′50″W	St. Paul, Minnesota	Classical Revival
9	Winona Masonic Temple		1909 built 1998 NRHP-listed	255 Main St. 44°3′2.5″N 91°38′22″W	Winona, Minnesota	Beaux-Arts temple and Scottish Rite Valley particularly noted for its intact collection of 98 theatrical backdrops and original stage equipment.
10	Lake Wilson Masonic Lodge		1911 built as of 2021 not yet NRHP-listed or -nominated	137 Broadway Avenue; 43°59′50.73108″N 95°57′13.59396″W	Lake Wilson, Minnesota	Chartered on January 18, 1906, and still active to the present day.

(compare to 7 in Category:Masonic buildings in Minnesota)

=== Mississippi ===
	Building	Image	Dates	Location	City, State	Description
1	Old Masonic Hall (Booneville, Mississippi)		__ built 2008 MS-listed		104 Main Street, North, Booneville, Mississippi	Designated a Mississippi Landmark in 1999
2	Masonic Hall (Carrollton, Mississippi)		1899 built 2002 MS-listed		Carrollton, Mississippi	Designated a Mississippi Landmark in 2002
3	Grenada Masonic Temple		1925 built 1988 NRHP-listed; 2007 MS-listed	210 S. Main St. 33°46′58″N 89°48′9″W	Grenada, Mississippi	Classical Revival
4	Masonic Hall (Gulfport, Mississippi)		19__ built 2008 MS-listed		Gulfport, Mississippi	Designated a Mississippi Landmark in 2008
5	Masonic Hall (Hazlehurst, Mississippi)		19__ built 2002 MS-listed		Hazlehurst, Mississippi	Designated a Mississippi Landmark in 2002
6	Masonic Temple (Hattiesburg, Mississippi)		19__ built 2003 MS-listed		Hattiesburg, Mississippi	Designated a Mississippi Landmark in 2003
7	Masonic Hall (Lexington, Mississippi)		19__ built 2003 MS-listed		Lexington, Mississippi	Designated a Mississippi Landmark in 2003
8	Masonic Hall (Long Beach, Mississippi)		19__ built 2008 MS-listed		Long Beach, Mississippi	Designated a Mississippi Landmark in 2008
9	Old Masonic Hall (Louisville, Mississippi)		1851 built 1994 NRHP-listed; 2007 MS-listed	311 W. Park St. 33°7′19″N 89°3′22″W	Louisville, Mississippi	Greek Revival; designated a Mississippi Landmark in 2007
10	Masonic Temple (Meridian, Mississippi)		1903 built 1979 NRHP-listed	1220 26th Ave. 32°22′10″N 88°42′16″W	Meridian, Mississippi	Demolished.
11	Scottish Rite Cathedral (Meridian, Mississippi)		1914 built 1979 NRHP-listed; 1985 destroyed 1987 NRHP-delisted	1101 23rd Ave.	Meridian, Mississippi	Egyptian Revival architecture directly inspired by architect's visit to Temple of Osiris in Egypt, in area now submerged by Aswan Dam. Destroyed by fire on March 20, 1985.
12	Pelahatchie City Hall and Masonic Hall		19__ built 2007 MS-listed		Pelahatchie, Mississippi	Designated a Mississippi Landmark in 2007
13	Eureka Masonic College		1847 built 1970 NRHP-listed	On MS 17; 32°58′27″N 89°59′11″W	Richland, Mississippi	Federal-style, NRHP-listed Birthplace of the Order of the Eastern Star.
14	Old Municipal Building and Masonic Hall		1935 built 2000 MS-listed		Shelby, Mississippi	Designated a Mississippi Landmark in 2000

(compare to 2 in Category:Masonic buildings in Mississippi)

=== Missouri ===
	Building	Image	Dates	Location	City, State	Description
1	Masonic Lodge (Grandin, Missouri)		1988 built 1980 NRHP-listed	5th and S. Elm Sts. 36°49′49″N 90°49′33″W	Grandin, Missouri	Two-story vernacular frame building.
2	Ancient Landmark Masonic Lodge Number 356 A.F. and A.M., aka Harrisburg School		1878(?) built 2013 NRHP	140 S. Harris St. 39°8′28″N 92°27′42″W	Harrisburg, Missouri	
3	Ironton Lodge Hall		1873 built 2013 NRHP-listed	133 N. Main St. 37°35′59″N 90°37′48″W	Ironton, Missouri	Three-story building with Greek Revival and Italianate features, built to serve primarily as meeting place for fraternal lodges.
4	H. E. Gensky Grocery Store Building, aka Capitol City Lodge No. 9 F. & A.M.		1915 built 2001 NRHP	423 Cherry St. 38°34′7″N 92°9′54″W	Jefferson City, Missouri	Early Commercial in style
5	Scottish Rite Cathedral (Joplin, Missouri)		1923 built 1990 NRHP-listed	505 Byers Ave. 37°5′11″N 94°31′2″W	Joplin, Missouri	Beaux Arts
6	Ivanhoe Masonic Temple		1920 built 1985 NRHP-listed	2301 E. Linwood Blvd. and 3201 Park Ave. 39°4′5″N 94°33′22″W	Kansas City, Missouri	Classical Revival; possibly demolished
7	Kansas City Masonic Temple		1909 built 1980 NRHP-listed	903 Harrison St. 39°6′11″N 94°34′13″W	Kansas City, Missouri	Classical Revival, Beaux Arts
8	Kennett City Hall and Masonic Lodge		1903 built 1981 NRHP-listed	122 College St. 36°14′11″N 90°4′8″W	Kennett, Missouri	Shared with Kennett's City Hall.
9	Masonic Temple (Kirksville, Missouri)		1930 built 2010 NRHP-listed	217 E. Harrison St. 40°11′44.06″N 92°34′54.78″W	Kirksville, Missouri	Four-story Egyptian Revival-style building.
10	Masonic College		1847–48		Lexington, Missouri	
11	Moolah Temple of the Mystic Shrine		1912 built 1978 NRHP CP-listed	3821 Lindell Boulevard; 38°38′21″N 90°14′21″W	St. Louis, Missouri	Moorish Revival architecture. Contributing building in St. Louis's Midtown Historic District
12	Negro Masonic Hall		1886 built 1993 NRHP-listed	3615-3619 Dr. Martin Luther King Blvd.38°38′49″N 90°13′37″W	St. Louis, Missouri	Romanesque. Prince Hall masons began using the building in 1909. Demolished after a fire in 1995.
13	New Masonic Temple (St. Louis, Missouri)		1926 built	3681 Lindell Boulevard; 38°38′18″N 90°14′06″W	St. Louis, Missouri	More than 185 feet (56 m) tall, constructed of Bedford limestone with gray granite trim; designed by architects Eames and Young.
14	Scottish Rite Cathedral (St. Louis, Missouri)		1924 built	3633 Lindell Boulevard; 38°38′13″N 90°14′01″W	St. Louis, Missouri	Designed by William B. Ittner
15	Lambskin Masonic Temple (aka Lambskin Temple)		1987 NRHP	1054 S. Kingshighway Boulevard; 38.6297°N 90.2636°W	St. Louis, Missouri	Art Deco, designed by Edward F. Nolte, of German descent, incorporating aspects of Germany's Art Nouveau Movement.
16	Nicolas Janis House		c. 1790-1791 built 19__ NRHP CP	241 St. Mary's Road; 37°58′35.4″N 90°2′31.9″W	Ste. Genevieve, Missouri	Poteaux-sur-sol construction
17	Abou Ben Adhem Shrine Mosque		1923 built 1982 NRHP-listed	St. Louis Street; 37°12′33.94″N 93°17′10.5″W	Springfield, Missouri	Arabesque, built in 1923
18	Masonic Temple (Warrensburg, Missouri)		1893-94 built 1998 NRHP-listed	101-1-3 W. Market St., and 301-303 N. Holden St. 38°45′55″N 93°44′23″W	Warrensburg, Missouri	Italianate Meeting hall of Corinthian Lodge # 265.
19	Mount Zion Lodge Masonic Temple		1933 built 2011 NRHP-listed	304 E. Main St. 36°43′41″N 91°51′1″W	West Plains, Missouri	An "austere" Classical Revival building with Tuscan pilasters

(compare to 20 in Category:Masonic buildings in Missouri)

=== Montana ===
	Building	Image	Dates	Location	City, State	Description
1	Masonic Temple (Billings, Montana)		1910 built 1986 NRHP-listed	2806 Third Ave. N. 45°47′1″N 108°30′25″W	Billings, Montana	Late 19th and 20th Century Revivals, Second Renaissance Revival
2	Masonic Temple (Deer Lodge, Montana)		1919 built 2008 NRHP CP-listed	501-503 Main St. 46.39771°N 112.73493°W	Deer Lodge, Montana	Modest Classical Revival. Included in Deer Lodge Central Business Historic District.
3	Masonic Building (Fort Benton, Montana)		1882 built 1980 NRHP-listed	1418 Front St. 47°49′3″N 110°39′41″W	Fort Benton, Montana	NRHP-listed
4	Masonic Temple (Great Falls, Montana)		1914 built 2000 NRHP-listed	821 Central Ave. 47°30′26″N 111°17′32″W	Great Falls, Montana	Tudor Revival
5	Algeria Shrine Temple		1919 built 1999 NRHP-listed	Neill and Park Aves. 46°35′43″N 112°2′21″W	Helena, Montana	Moorish Revival style. Operated by city of Helena as the Helena Civic Center.
6	Lavina Temple Lodge #101 aka Lavina State Bank		1908 built 2007 NRHP	101 Main St. 46°17′40″N 108°56′15″W	Lavina, Montana	Western Commercial in style
7	Masonic Temple (Lewistown, Montana)		1908 built 1979 NRHP-listed	322 W. Broadway St. 47°3′53″N 109°25′35″W	Lewistown, Montana	A standalone three-story building built by stonemasons from Croatia.
8	Masonic Lodge (Missoula, Montana)		1909 built 1990 NRHP-listed	120-136 E. Broadway Ave. 46°52′19″N 113°59′32″W	Missoula, Montana	Beaux Arts

(compare to 9 in Category:Masonic buildings in Montana)

=== Nebraska ===
	Building	Image	Dates	Location	City, State	Description
1	Bradshaw Town Hall		1902-03 built 1984 NRHP	Off US 34; 40°53′01″N 97°44′48″W	Bradshaw, Nebraska	
2	Masonic Temple (Callaway, Nebraska)			S. Grand Ave; 41.29043°N 99.92572°W	Callaway, Nebraska	
3	Masonic Temple (Lincoln, Nebraska)		1934 built 2005 NRHP-listed	1635 L St. 40°48′33″N 96°41′54″W	Lincoln, Nebraska	Art Deco
4	Scottish Rite Temple (Lincoln, Nebraska)		1916 built 1986 NRHP-listed	332 Centennial Mall S 40°48′35″N 96°42′5″W	Lincoln, Nebraska	Classical Revival
5	Scottish Rite Cathedral (Omaha, Nebraska)		1912-1914 built	2001 Douglas Street; 41.258646°N 95.942359°W	Omaha, Nebraska	Neoclassical building, known today as the Omaha Scottish Rite Masonic Center
6	Masonic Temple (Benson, Omaha, Nebraska)		1926 built 2020 NRHP CP	5901-5905 Maple Street; 41.28482°N 96.00368°W	Benson neighborhood in Omaha, Nebraska	Three-story Classical Revival building with an irregular brick parapet, included in Benson Commercial Historic District.

(compare to 6 in Category:Masonic buildings in Nebraska)

=== Nevada ===
	Building	Image	Dates	Location	City, State	Description
1	Austin Masonic and Odd Fellows Hall		1867 built 2003 NRHP-listed	105 Main St. 39°29′34″N 117°4′10″W	Austin, Nevada	Two-story brick building.

(compare to 1 in Category:Masonic buildings in Nevada)

=== New Hampshire ===
	Building	Image	Dates	Location	City, State	Description
1	New England Masonic Charitable Institute		1858 built 2019 NRHP-listed	30 Town House Rd. 43.73956°N 71.01153°W	Effingham, New Hampshire	Italianate

=== New Jersey ===
	Building	Image	Dates	Location	City, State	Description
1	Madison Masonic Lodge		2008 NRHP-listed	170 Main Street; 40°45′25″N 74°24′31″W	Madison, New Jersey	NRHP-listed Originally built as a Presbyterian Church, the building was purchased by the local lodge in 1930
2	Plainfield Masonic Temple		1929 built 2024 NRHP-listed	105 East 7th Street; 40°36′55″N 74°25′2.5″W	Plainfield, New Jersey	Built by Jerusalem Lodge No. 26 F & AM
3	Bellevue Avenue Colored School		1883 built 1997 NRHP-listed	81 Bellevue Ave. 40°13′32″N 74°46′17″W	Trenton, New Jersey	Built and notable as a school for black children. Later became the King David F & AM Lodge No. 15.
4	Old Masonic Temple		1793 built 1976 NRHP CP-listed	102 Barrack Street; 40°13′8″N 74°46′5″W	Trenton, New Jersey	Included in State House District. At some point it was used as tourist information center.

=== New Mexico ===
	Building	Image	Dates	Location	City, State	Description
1	Lebanon Lodge No. 22		1932 built 1989 NRHP-listed	106 W. Aztec; 35°31′36″N 108°44′26″W	Gallup, New Mexico	Decorative Brick Commercial building
2	Masonic Temple (Las Vegas, New Mexico)		1894-95 built 1983 NRHP CP-listed	514 Douglas	Las Vegas, New Mexico	Designed by Rapp and Rapp in Richardsonian Romanesque style; included in Douglas-Sixth Street Historic District
3	Scottish Rite Cathedral (Santa Fe, New Mexico)		1911 built 1987 NRHP-listed	463 Paseo de Peralta; 35°41′30″N 105°56′9″W	Santa Fe, New Mexico	Moorish Revival or "Spanish-Pueblo style". NRHP-listed

=== New York ===
	Building	Image	Dates	Location	City, State	Description
1	Camden Masonic Temple of Philanthropic Lodge No. 164 F. & A.M.		1863 Built	1 Masonic Ave; 43°20′5.844″N 75°45′.966″W	Camden, New York	Italianate style
2	Hobart Masonic Hall		1889 built 2001 NRHP-listed	6 Cornell Ave. 42°22′22″N 74°40′2″W	Hobart, New York	Built in 1889, in Stick/Eastlake style
3	Advance Masonic Temple, Free and Accepted Masons		1915 built	2114 30th Ave, Astoria, New York 11102. 40.7693942, -73.9274833	Astoria, New York	Built in 1915 in Italianate Style
4	DePew Lodge No. 823, Free and Accepted Masons		1916 built 1999 NRHP-listed	5497 Broadway; 42°53′56″N 78°40′0″W	Lancaster, New York	Classical Revival
5	Lowville Masonic Temple		1928 built	7552 S. State St. 43.78597°N 75.49143°W	Lowville, New York	Built 1928 in Colonial Revival style. After 2002 it served as a local history museum.
6	Mecca Temple		1922 built 1984 NRHP-listed	131 N. 55th St. 40°45′50″N 73°58′48″W	New York, New York	Built as a Shriners' mosque and originally contained Masonic lodge rooms. It is neo-Moorish in style, and its architect was a Mason. Later known as New York City Center, a theatre.
7	Masonic Temple — Newport Lodge No. 445 F. & A.M.		1903 built 2010 NRHP-listed	7408 NY 28; 43°10′51.42″N 75°0′37.84″W	Newport, New York	Colonial Revival
7	The Level Club		1925 built 1984 NRHP-listed	253 W. 73rd St. 40°46′49″N 73°59′0″W	New York, New York	"Designed to be 'the finest Masonic club in the world', the building served as a hostel for visiting Masons, and when it finally opened in 1927, it included an enormous banquet room, an Olympic-sized pool, a gymnasium, a 1,500-seat theater and a roof garden."
8	Masonic Building and Hall (Manhattan)		hall: 1907 built building: 1913 built	hall: 44 W. 24th St. 40°44′36″N 73°59′30″W building: 71 W. 23rd St. 40°44′35″N 73°59′32″W	New York, New York	The Masonic Building and Hall were designed by Harry P. Knowles, one of the architects of the New York City Center. The Masonic Building is a commercial enterprise, generating funds for the Lodge's charitable activities. It replaced the Masonic Temple on the same site, built in 1875 and designed by Napoleon LeBrun. The Hall includes a 1200-seat auditorium – the Grand Lodge Room – and a dozen other Lodge Rooms, all elaborately ornamented. The Hall's interior was restored in 1986–96 by Felix Chavez, Fine Art Decorating.
9	Warren Lodge No. 32		1865 built 2007 NRHP-listed	1144 Centre Rd. 41°52′41″N 73°48′16″W	Schultzville, New York	Built in 1865 in Italianate style
10	DeWint House		1700 built 1966 NRHP-listed	20 Livingston Avenue; 41°01′11″N 73°56′48″W	Tappan, New York	A Dutch Colonial house used as headquarters by Washington, acquired by the New York Masonic Grand Lodge in 1932, declared a National Historic Landmark in 1966.
11	Watertown Masonic Temple		1914 built 1980 NRHP-listed	240 Washington St. 43°58′23″N 75°54′42″W	Watertown, New York	Built in 1914 in Classical Revival style
12	Tower Homestead and Masonic Temple		c.1800, 1830, 1910 built 1977 NRHP-listed	210 Tower St. and Sanger St. 42°55′51″N 75°23′01″W	Waterville, New York	With a 3-stage tower, built in 1896.
13	Jephtha Masonic Lodge No. 494		1860 Charter 1904 built	342-343 New York Aven	Huntington, New York	Three story building constructed 1904–1905

(compare to 13 in Category:Masonic buildings in New York (state))

=== North Carolina ===
	Building	Image	Dates	Location	City, State	Description
1	Asheville Masonic Temple		1913 built 1979 NRHP CP-listed	80 Broadway Street; 35.598106°N 82.552435°W	Asheville, North Carolina	Designed by British American architect and Freemason Richard Sharp Smith, the building was opened in April 1915.
2	Adoniram Masonic Lodge		1917 built 1988 NRHP-listed	Jct. of NC 1410 and NC 1300; 36°28′46″N 78°39′58″W	Cornwall, North Carolina	I-house-style frame building, moved in 1948; bottom floor housed a public school for six years.
2.5	Eagle Lodge		1823 built 1971 NRHP-listed	142 W. King St. 36°04′31″N 79°05′59″W	Hillsborough, North Carolina	"an interesting example of the adaptive usage of early Greek Revival motifs in a building constructed specifically as a Masonic lodge"
3	Holly Springs Masonic Lodge		c.1852 built 2010 NRHP-listed	224 Raleigh St.	Holly Springs, North Carolina	Greek Revival
4	Bank of Onslow and Jacksonville Masonic Temple		1916 built 1989 NRHP-listed	214-216 Old Bridge St. 34°45′2″N 77°25′54″W	Jacksonville, North Carolina	Beaux Arts and Tudor Revival building from 1916
5	Masonic Temple and Theater		1802-09 built 1972 NRHP-listed	516 Hancock St. 35°6′39″N 77°2′25″W	New Bern, North Carolina	Site of a duel in 1802
5.5	Phoenix Masonic Lodge No. 8		c.1855 built 1983 NRHP-listed	221 Mason St. 38°03′21″N 78°52′48″W	Fayetteville, North Carolina	Greek Revival
6	Pittsboro Masonic Lodge		1838 built 1978 NRHP-listed	East and Masonic Sts. 35°43′13″N 79°10′32″W	Pittsboro, North Carolina	Greek Revival
7	Josephus Daniels House / Masonic Temple of Raleigh		1920 built 1976 NRHP-listed	1520 Caswell St. 35°47′56.65″N 78°38′50.43″W	Raleigh, North Carolina	Originally the home of Josephus Daniels, Secretary of the Navy under President Woodrow Wilson. Subsequently, purchased by the local area Freemasons in 1950, and converted into a meeting hall.
8	Masonic Temple Building (Blount Street, Raleigh, North Carolina)		1907 built 1984 NRHP-listed	427 South Blount Street; 35°46′26.83″N 78°38′12.47″W	Raleigh, North Carolina	Prince Hall affiliated.
9	Masonic Temple Building (Fayetteville Street, Raleigh, North Carolina)		1907 built 1984 NRHP-listed	133 Fayetteville Street; 35°46′26.83″N 78°38′12.47″W	Raleigh, North Carolina	North Carolina's first reinforced concrete skyscraper.
10	Masonic Temple Building (Shelby, North Carolina)		1925 built 1982 NRHP-listed	203 S. Washington St. 35°16′54″N 81°32′18″W	Shelby, North Carolina	Exotic Revival, Egyptian Revival
11	Smithfield Masonic Lodge		c.1854 and 1915-17 built 2007 NRHP-listed	115 N. Second St. 35°30′51″N 78°20′51″W	Smithfield, North Carolina	Greek Revival
12	Masonic Hall (Waynesville, North Carolina)		1927 built 1988 NRHP-listed	114 Church St. 35°29′23″N 82°59′20″W	Waynesville, North Carolina	Classical Revival

(compare to 10 in Category:Masonic buildings in North Carolina)

=== North Dakota ===
	Building	Image	Dates	Location	City, State	Description
1	Masonic Block		1887 built 1982 NRHP-CP-listed	31 6th Ave. N. 46.901216°N 97.212598°W	Casselton, North Dakota	Brick building in two 50 by 90 feet (15 m × 27 m) parts, with pressed metal cornice displaying "MASONIC BLOCK" and "1887". Included in Casselton Commercial Historic District.
2	Northern Lights Masonic Lodge		1916 built 1987 NRHP-listed	Ninth St. 47°26′36″N 98°7′23″W	Cooperstown, North Dakota	A Bungalow/Craftsman style building, built in 1916, NRHP-listed for its architecture
3	Devils Lake Masonic Temple		1916 built 2001 NRHP-listed	403 Sixth St. 48°6′50″N 98°48′33″W	Devils Lake, North Dakota	Classical Revival
4	Masonic Block (Fargo, North Dakota)		1884 built 1979 NRHP-listed	11 S. 8th St. 46°51′55″N 96°47′29″W	Fargo, North Dakota	Early Commercial
5	Masonic Center (Grand Forks, North Dakota)		1913 built 1982 NRHP-listed	413-421 Bruce Ave. 47°55′18″N 97°1′43″W	Grand Forks, North Dakota	Renaissance design by Joseph Bell DeRemer
6	Masonic Temple		1907 built 1980 NRHP CP-listed	108 Main St. S. 48.234990°N 101.293449°W	Minot, North Dakota	Italianate brick building, a contributing building in the Minot Commercial Historic District.
7	Mizpah Lodge Building		1905 built 2005 NRHP-listed	260 Front St. 46°35′20″N 97°29′32″W	Sheldon, North Dakota	Built for Mizpah Lodge #39, chartered in 1893, after the small town had accumulated seven fraternal organizations, so scheduling meetings had become an issue.

(compare to 9 in Category:Masonic buildings in North Dakota)

=== Ohio ===
	Building	Image	Dates	Location	City, State	Description
1	Times Building-Lodge Hall		1902 built 1989 NRHP-listed	19 E. Waterloo St. 39°50′32″N 82°48′18″W	Canal Winchester, Ohio	
1.5	Masonic Lodge (Circleville, Ohio)		1876 built 1978 NRHP CP	113-115 S. Court St.	Circleville, Ohio	Included in Circleville Historic District
2	Cleveland Masonic Temple		1920 built 2001 NRHP-listed	3615 Euclid Ave. 41°30′13″N 81°39′44″W	Cleveland, Ohio	Late 19th and Early 20th Century American Movements architecture
3	Masonic Temple (Columbus, Ohio)		1899 built 1997 NRHP-listed	34 N. 4th St. 39°57′49″N 82°59′48″W	Columbus, Ohio	Classical Revival
4	York Lodge No. 563		1915 built 1984 NRHP-listed	1276 N. High St. 39°59′18″N 83°0′19″W	Columbus, Ohio	Late 19th and 20th Century Revivals, Italian Renaissance architecture
5	York Rite Masonic Temple		1925 built 1983 NRHP-listed	861-867 Mt. Vernon Ave. 39°58′16″N 82°58′44″W	Columbus, Ohio	Also known as Pythian Temple and James Pythian Theater, a Colonial Revival building from 1925, NRHP-listed
6	Dayton Masonic Center		1925-1928 built 1986 CP-NRHP-listed	573 W. Riverview Avenue; 39°45′55.56″N 84°12′10.94″W	Dayton, Ohio	Classical Revival
7	Masonic Temple		1890 built 1995 NRHP-listed	422 Broadway; 40°37′3″N 80°34′38″W	East Liverpool, Ohio	Built 1916 in Colonial Revival style. as a private residence, it was purchased by the Masons in 1910 and converted into a meeting hall. Also known as the "Godwin-Knowles House".
8	Masonic Temple		1880-84 built 1974 NRHP-listed	409 West Main Street; 41°9′15″N 81°21′47″W	Kent, Ohio	An Italianate house, originally the home of the Marvin Kent family, it was purchased by the local Masonic lodge in 1923 and converted into a meeting hall.
9	Masonic Temple (Mechanicsburg, Ohio)		1909 built 1985 NRHP-listed	N. Main St. 40°4′21″N 83°33′23″W	Mechanicsburg, Ohio	Bungalow/Craftsman
10	Medina Masonic Temple and Medina Theater	temple	1924 built 2002 NRHP-listed	120 N. Elmwood Ave. and 139 W. Liberty St. 41°8′22″N 81°51′57″W	Medina, Ohio	Greek Revival
11	Niles Masonic Temple		1923 built 2006 NRHP-listed	22 W. Church St. 41°10′55″N 80°45′59″W	Niles, Ohio	Late 19th and 20th Century Revivals
12	Rushville Masonic Hall		c.1850 built 1980 NRHP CP	Main St. & Market St. 39.76438°N 82.43162°W	Richland Township, Fairfield County, Ohio	Town Hall and Masonic Hall, in Rushville Historic District
13	Masonic Temple (Sandusky, Ohio)		1889 built	302 Wayne St. 41°27′19.19″N 82°42′32.01″W	Sandusky, Ohio	Romanesque; also known as "Science Lodge No. 50 F & A M", determined NRHP-eligible
14	Masonic Temple (Springfield, Ohio)		1927 built 2008 NRHP-listed	125 W. High St. 39°55′24″N 83°48′48″W	Springfield, Ohio	NRHP-listed
15	Masonic Temple Building (Vermilion, Ohio)		1870 built 1979 NRHP-listed	Main St., S. of Liberty St. 41°25′18″N 82°21′55″W	Vermilion, Ohio	Italianate
16	New England Lodge		1820 built 1973 NRHP-listed	634 N. High St. 40°05′10″N 83°01′04″W	Worthington, Ohio	Oldest Masonic lodge west of the Allegheny Mountains which has been in continuous Masonic use. Plans in 2016 were to convert it to condominiums, though retaining space for a Masonic museum and offices.
17	West Milton Lodge No. 577		1983 built	102 North Washington St. 39°57′49.8″N 84°19′38.9″W	West Milton, Ohio	
18	Masonic Temple (Youngstown, Ohio)		1909 built 1997 NRHP-listed	223–227 Wick Ave. 41°6′9″N 80°38′51″W	Youngstown, Ohio	Colonial Revival; In January 2016 it was announced that the Masons could no longer afford the building and that the building was to be sold.
19	Masonic Lodge No. 472		1884 built 2000 NRHP-listed	18 Commercial St. 39°16′56″N 82°23′37″W	Zaleski, Ohio	Italianate
20	Lafayette Lodge No. 79		1857 built 1978 NRHP-listed	333 Market St. 39°56′32″N 82°0′28″W	Zanesville, Ohio	
21	Masonic Temple Building (Zanesville, Ohio)		1903 built 1990 NRHP-listed	36-42 N. Fourth St. 39°56′27″N 82°0′25″W	Zanesville, Ohio	Second Renaissance Revival.
22	St. Mark's Masonic Temple No. 7 of the Prince Hall Free & Accepted Masons		1927 built, 2009 listed	988 E. Long Street	Columbus, Ohio	

(compare to 17 in Category:Masonic buildings in Ohio)

=== Oklahoma ===
	Building	Image	Dates	Location	City, State	Description
1	Masonic Temple (Atoka, Oklahoma)		1915 built 1980 NRHP-listed	301 Court St. 34°23′7″N 96°7′29″W	Atoka, Oklahoma	Has stained glass windows.
2	Enid Masonic Temple		1924 built 1984 NRHP-listed	301 W. Broadway	Enid, Oklahoma	Italian Renaissance Revival; home of the Enid Symphony Orchestra.
3	First National Bank and Masonic Lodge		1906 built (Bank portion); 1924 built (Masonic hall); 1984 NRHP-listed	301 N. Main St. 36°34′15″N 96°42′16″W	Fairfax, Oklahoma	Best example of Georgian Revival architecture in Osage County
4	Scottish Rite Temple (Guthrie, Oklahoma)		1919 built 1987 NRHP-listed	900 E. Oklahoma; 35°52′41″N 97°24′48″W	Guthrie, Oklahoma	Built 1920–1923; described as the largest and most elaborately designed and constructed Masonic Temple in the state.
5	International Temple, Supreme Assembly, Order of the Rainbow for Girls		1951 built 2013 NRHP-listed	315 East Carl Albert Parkway; 34.9325°N 95.7647°W	McAlester, Oklahoma	Moderne headquarters for the International Order of the Rainbow for Girls, which was founded in McAlester in 1922 and grew to 50,000 members in 1940, before declining.
6	McAlester Scottish Rite Temple		1907 built 1980 NRHP-listed	2nd St. and Adams Ave. 34°56′7″N 95°45′56″W	McAlester, Oklahoma	Art Deco, Neo-classic
7	Masonic Lodge Hall		1929 built 1983 NRHP-listed	1st and Main Sts. 35°52′34″N 94°52′39″W	Miami, Oklahoma	It comprises half of the second floor of the Coleman Theatre complex, designed in Spanish Colonial Revival style by the Boller Brothers of Kansas City, Missouri.
8	India Temple Shrine Building		1923 built 1980 NRHP-listed	621 N. Robinson Ave. 35°28′25″N 97°30′58″W	Oklahoma City, Oklahoma	Built in 1923 by multiple Masonic lodges. Later home of the Journal Record and site of a museum focused on the 1995 Oklahoma City bombing, which damaged the building
9	Pond Creek Masonic Lodge No. 125		1953 built 2010 NRHP-listed	126 Broadway Ave.	Pond Creek, Oklahoma	
10	Tonkawa Lodge No. 157 A.F. & A.M.		1925 built 2007 NRHP-listed	112 N. 7th St. 36°40′45″N 97°18′28″W	Tonkawa, Oklahoma	Classical Revival, designed by Oklahoma City architects Hawk & Parr

(compare to 8 in Category:Masonic buildings in Oklahoma)

=== Oregon ===
	Building	Image	Dates	Location	City, State	Description
1	Ashland Masonic Lodge Building		1909 built 1992 NRHP-listed	25 N. Main St. 42°11′49″N 122°42′52″W	Ashland, Oregon	Colonial Revival, Georgian Revival
2	Umatilla Masonic Lodge Hall		1901 built 1997 NRHP-listed	200 S. Dupont St. 45°44′31″N 119°11′43″W	Echo, Oregon	Italianate, Western False Front
3	Masonic Cemetery and Hope Abbey Mausoleum		1859 (cemetery); 1914 (mausoleum); 1980 NRHP-listed	25th and University Sts., Eugene, Oregon; 44°1′53″N 123°4′24″W	Eugene, Oregon	Hope Abbey is an Egyptian Revival-style mausoleum designed by Ellis F. Lawrence and dedicated in 1914.
4	Masonic Temple (Pendleton, Oregon)		1887 built 1982 NRHP-listed	18 SW Emigrant Ave. 45°40′14″N 118°47′7″W	Pendleton, Oregon	High Victorian Italianate
5	Mount Hood Masonic Temple		1923 built 2008 NRHP-listed	5308 N. Commercial Ave. 45°33′42.7″N 122°40′14.9″W	Portland, Oregon	Colonial Revival
6	Palestine Lodge		1923 built 2008 NRHP-listed	6401 SE Foster Road; 45.490120°N 122.596599°W	Portland, Oregon	Beaux Arts, Exotic Revival
7	Sellwood Masonic Lodge		1930 built	7126 SE Milwaukie47.47262°N 122.64828°W	Portland, Oregon	Designed by Francis Marion Stokes.

(compare to 5 in Category:Masonic buildings in Oregon)

=== Pennsylvania ===
	Building	Image	Dates	Location	City, State	Description
1	Allentown Masonic Temple		1923 built 2004 NRHP-listed	1524 W. Linden St. 40°35′55″N 75°29′25″W	Allentown, Pennsylvania	Classical Revival
2	Masonic Temple (Chambersburg, Pennsylvania)		1823 built 1976 NRHP-listed	74 S. 2nd St. 39°56′8″N 77°39′35″W	Chambersburg, Pennsylvania	Early Republic
3	Scottish Rite Cathedral (Harrisburg, Pennsylvania)		19__ built	2701 N. Third St. 40°17′22″N 76°53′59″W	Harrisburg, Pennsylvania	
4	Zembo Shrine Building		1930 built		Harrisburg, Pennsylvania	Moorish Revival style
5	Scottish Rite Cathedral (New Castle, Pennsylvania)		1925-26 built 2008 NRHP-listed	Neo-classic; 41°0′19″N 80°20′41″W	New Castle, Pennsylvania	Classical Revival
6	Masonic Temple (Philadelphia, Pennsylvania)		1873 built 1971 NRHP-listed	1 N. Broad St. 39°57′13″N 75°9′47″W	Philadelphia, Pennsylvania	Houses the headquarters of the Grand Lodge of Pennsylvania and has been designated a National Historic Landmark
7	Masonic Temple (Pittsburgh, Pennsylvania)		1914-15 built 1983 CP-NRHP-listed	Fifth and Lytton Avenues; 40°26′44.09″N 79°57′13.9″W	Pittsburgh, Pennsylvania	Greek Revival; is now Alumni Hall (University of Pittsburgh), a contributing property in a historic district
8	Masonic Temple and Scottish Rite Cathedral (Scranton, Pennsylvania)		1930 built 1997 NRHP-listed	416–420 North Washington Avenue; 41°24′39″N 75°39′38″W	Scranton, Pennsylvania	Gothic Revival

=== Rhode Island ===
	Building	Image	Dates	Location	City, State	Description
1	Masonic Temple (Providence, Rhode Island)		1926-2007 built 1993 NRHP-listed	Francis Street; 41°49′47.45″N 71°25′2.73″W	Providence, Rhode Island	One of a pair of buildings listed in the National Register of Historic Places as "Veterans Memorial Auditorium—Masonic Temple". Construction was started by Freemasons in 1926, but was abandoned in 1928 and did not resume until the 2000s. The building was completed in 2007 and is now the Providence Renaissance Hotel.

=== South Carolina ===
	Building	Image	Dates	Location	City, State	Description
1	Masonic Temple		1872 built 1966 CP-NRHP-listed	270 King St. 32°46′55.88″N 79°55′56.6″W	Charleston, South Carolina	Brick and stucco Tudor Gothic style building designed by architect John Henry Devereux, a Catholic who joined the Masons reportedly to defuse criticism for his contract for this building. Included in Charleston Historic District. See pic at Flickr.
2	Masonic Temple		1927 built 1983 CP-NRHP-listed		Spartanburg, South Carolina	Three-story building with stepped parapet. One of two key contributing buildings in Spartanburg Historic District

=== South Dakota ===
	Building	Image	Dates	Location	City, State	Description
1	Masonic Temple (Aberdeen, South Dakota)		1899 built 1980 NRHP-listed	503 S. Main St. 45°27′35″N 98°29′15″W	Aberdeen, South Dakota	Romanesque, Italian Villa, and Moorish styles
2	Arlington Masonic Temple		1907-08 built 2017 NRHP-listed	222 S. Main St. 44°21′47″N 97°08′06″W	Arlington, South Dakota	
3	Bryant Masonic Lodge 118		2020 NRHP-listed	204 East Main St. 44°35′26″N 97°27′47″W	Bryant, South Dakota	
4	Flandreau Masonic Temple		1916 built 1989 NRHP-listed	200 E. Second Ave. 44°02′59″N 96°35′28.8″W	Flandreau, South Dakota	Major renovation of a former, damaged courthouse building in 1916 produced "massive" Colonial Revival building with pediment supported by four Ionic columns.
5	Hermosa Masonic Lodge		1889 built 1926 moved 2009 NRHP-listed		Hermosa, South Dakota	Built as a schoolhouse, moved and converted in 1926
6	Mobridge Masonic Temple		1923 built 1977 NRHP-listed	6th and Main Sts. 45°32′17″N 100°26′0″W	Mobridge, South Dakota	Exotic Revival
7	Mt. Moriah Masonic Lodge No. 155		1917 built 2004 NRHP-listed	101 Main St. S 43°50′11″N 101°30′35″W	Kadoka, South Dakota	Classical Revival
8	Parker Masonic Hall		1925 built 2004 NRHP-listed	130 S. Cherry Ave. 43°23′55″N 97°8′3″W	Parker, South Dakota	Renaissance style
9	Pierre Masonic Lodge		1928 built 2009 NRHP-listed	201 W. Capitol Ave. 44°38′30″N 100°21′34″W	Pierre, South Dakota	Classical Revival, designed by architects Perkins & McWayne
10	Grand Lodge and Library of the Ancient Free and Accepted Masons		1924 built 1976 NRHP-listed	415 S. Main Ave. 43°32′34″N 96°43′42″W	Sioux Falls, South Dakota	Classical Revival

=== Tennessee ===
	Building	Image	Dates	Location	City, State	Description
1	Hiram Masonic Lodge No. 7		1823 built 1973 NRHP-listed; 1973 NHL	S. 2nd Ave. 35°55′32″N 86°52′13.5″W	Franklin, Tennessee	Oldest public building in Franklin, oldest Masonic Hall in continuous use in Tennessee. The Treaty of Franklin, in which the Chickasaw Indians sold their lands prior to being moved west to today's Oklahoma, was signed in this building in 1830. Sitting president Andrew Jackson was a participant. The building was used as a hospital for wounded Union soldiers after the Battle of Franklin, during the American Civil War.
2	Shrine Building (Memphis, Tennessee)		1923 built 1979 NRHP-listed	66 Monroe Ave. 35°8′40″N 90°3′16″W	Memphis, Tennessee	Converted to apartments in 1981 and into 75 condominium apartments in 2005.
3	Grand Lodge Building (Tennessee)		1925 built	100 7th Ave. N. 36.159790°N 86.780828°W	Nashville, Tennessee	Classical Revival-style building designed by Nashville architects Asmus and Clark.
4	Port Royal Masonic Lodge and General Store		1859 built	3300 Old Clarksville Hwy. 36°33′14.1″N 87°08′31.6″W	Port Royal, Tennessee	Last standing building from the historic townsite. Now used as the Port Royal State Park visitor center.
5	Sevierville Masonic Lodge		1893 built 1980 NRHP-listed	119 Main St. 35°52′6″N 83°33′50″W	Sevierville, Tennessee	Its first floor was the Sevierville Public Library from 1928 to 1968; Masons stayed until 1973.
6	Stanton Masonic Lodge and School		1871 built 1987 NRHP-listed	W. Main St. 35°27′56″N 89°24′17″W	Stanton, Tennessee	Greek Revival
7	Warfield Lodge No. 44 F&AM		1912 built	Main St. and 9th St. 36°31′53.0″N 87°20′50.3″W	Clarksville, Tennessee	

=== Texas ===
	Building	Image	Dates	Location	City, State	Description
1	Royal Arch Masonic Lodge		1926 built 2005 NRHP-listed	311 W. 7th St. 30°16′16″N 97°44′43″W	Austin, Texas	Beaux Arts
2	Scottish Rite Dormitory		1922 built 1998 NRHP-listed	210 W. 27th St. 30°17′33″N 97°44′22″W	Austin, Texas	Colonial Revival dorm hall at University of Texas, Austin. Built and owned by Scottish Rite Masons to house Masons' daughters.
3	Old Masonic Hall (Bellville, Texas)		1886 built 1986 NRHP-listed	15 N. Masonic St. 29°57′3″N 96°15′28″W	Bellville, Texas	Later home of Bellville Historical Society.
4	Blessing Masonic Lodge No. 411		c.1875 built 2011 NRHP-listed	619 Ave. B (FM 616); 28°52′34″N 96°13′08″W	Blessing, Texas	Texas folk or vernacular in style.
5	Las Moras Masonic Lodge Building		1990 recorded Texas Historical Landmark	503 S. Ann St. 29°18′41″N 100°25′2″W	Brackettville, Texas	Ann Street (Highway 334) at Cook Alley, Brackettville
6	Dallas Scottish Rite Temple		1913 built 1978 NRHP-listed	500 S. Harwood Street; 32°46′45.02″N 96°47′32.04″W	Dallas, Texas	A monumental Beaux Arts structure in the Farmers Market District. Constructed in 1913 as an official headquarters for use by the Scottish Rite Masons and other local Masonic lodges, it is a fine example of early 20th century Beaux Arts architecture in Texas. Massive limestone and steel building for the Grand Lodge of Texas A.F. & A.M. in 1941
7	Hillcrest Masonic Lodge #1318		1947 built	8525 Midway Rd.	Dallas, Texas	This building is situated in North Dallas in the old Love Field Quarry. Stone quarry walls can still be seen on the 30 ft drive down from the street. The Building is a York Rite - Royal Arch Temple. The property was renovated in 2016 and is a beautiful example of Freemasonry in North America.
8	Farmersville Masonic Lodge No. 214, A.F. and A.M		1888 built 2005 NRHP-listed	101 S. Main St. 33°9′55″N 96°21′35″W	Farmersville, Texas	Italianate Later housed the local Farmerville Times.
9	Fort Worth Masonic Temple		1932 built 2017 NRHP-listed	1100 Henderson St. 32°44′50″N 97°20′18″W	Fort Worth, Texas	The building exhibits Neo-classical styling with Art moderne influences and features upper-story Ionic columns and monel alloy bas-relief doors. It features two grand staircases at the main entrance which leads to a terrace. The main doors depict the three Ancient Grand Masters of Masonic legend, King Solomon, Hiram, King of Tyre, and Hiram Abif.
10	South Side Masonic Lodge No. 1114		1924 built 1985 NRHP-listed	1301 W. Magnolia; 32°43′48″N 97°20′16″W	Fort Worth, Texas	Classical Revival.
11	Scottish Rite Cathedral (Galveston, Texas)		1928 built 1984 NRHP-listed	2128 Church St. 29°18′14″N 94°47′30″W	Galveston, Texas	Designed and/or built by A.C. Finn
12	Masonic Hall		1966 recorded Texas Historical Landmark	613 Main St. 30°29′21″N 99°46′1″W	Junction, Texas	
13	Masonic Building (Kerrville, Texas)		1890 built 1984 NRHP-listed	211 Earl Garrett St. 30°2′44″N 99°8′23″W	Kerrville, Texas	Italianate style
14	Royse City Lodge No. 663 A.F. & A.M.		1925 built 1994 NRHP-listed	102 S. Arch St. 32°58′30″N 96°19′50″W	Royse City, Texas	
15	Masonic Lodge 570		1927 built 1988 NRHP-listed	130 S. Oakes; 31°27′44″N 100°26′2″W	San Angelo, Texas	Moderne style
16	Scottish Rite Cathedral (San Antonio, Texas)		1924 built 1996 NRHP-listed	308 Ave. E 29°25′39″N 98°29′13″W	San Antonio, Texas	Classical Revival
17	Masonic Lodge Building		1967 recorded Texas Historical Landmark	511 North Avenue D	Shiner, Texas	
18	St. John's AF & AM Lodge		1932 built 2005 NRHP-listed	323 W. Front St. 32°20′57″N 95°18′14″W	Tyler, Texas	Designed by Shirley Simons
19	Masonic Lodge Hall (Waxahachie, Texas)		1889 built		Waxahachie, Texas	Later the Ellis County Museum

(compare to 14 in Category:Masonic buildings in Texas)

=== Utah ===
	Building	Image	Dates	Location	City, State	Description
1	Salt Lake Masonic Temple		1927 built 1982 NRHP CP-listed	40°46′08″N 111°52′20″W	Salt Lake City, Utah	Egyptian Revival. Contributing property in South Temple Historic District.

=== Vermont ===
	Building	Image	Dates	Location	City, State	Description
1	Masonic Temple		1929 "created" 1979 NRHP-CP-listed	2 Academy Street	Barre, Vermont	Monumental pedimented Tuscan portico, Masonic Temple signage, and offices extension to the rear added in 1929 to c.1830-built Greek Revival house. Included in Barre Downtown Historic District.
2	Burlington Masonic Temple		1897 built 1974 NRHP-CP-listed	1, 3 and 5 Church Street corner of Pearl Street	Burlington, Vermont	Richardsonian Romanesque; included in Head of Church Street Historic District.
3	Masonic Temple (Northfield, Vermont)			Elm & S. Main	Northfield, Vermont	
4	Masonic Temple		1912 built 1980 NRHP CP	Eastern Avenue	St. Johnsbury, Vermont	Contributing in St. Johnsbury Historic District.

=== Virginia ===
	Building	Image	Dates	Location	City, State	Description
1	George Washington National Masonic Memorial		1922-1932 built	Shuter's Hill; 38°48′27″N 77°03′58″W	Alexandria, Virginia	Only Masonic building supported and maintained by the 52 grand lodges of the United States. This is counter to common Masonic practice, where a building is only supported by the Grand Lodge of the state in which it resides. The building also houses the collection of Alexandria-Washington Lodge No. 22, which contains most of the Masonic-fraternal artifacts of George Washington, a Mason.
2	Hamilton Masonic Lodge		1873 built 1999 NRHP-listed	43 S. Rogers St. 39°8′1″N 77°39′54″W	Hamilton, Virginia	Italianate-style brick building built in 1873 to serve as a Masonic meetingplace and as a school for grades 1–12. The building's brickwork is seven-course American bond. It is "the only Masonic building in Loudoun County that follows the design principles of the Freemasons. From its outset until 1921, the building also served as a public school, and is significant as the finest surviving school building of its time."
3	Masonic Temple		1930 built		Portsmouth, Virginia	Contributing property in the Downtown Portsmouth Historic District.
4	Acca Temple Shrine		1926 built	37°32′46″N 77°27′08″W	Richmond, Virginia	Currently the Altria Theater, formerly the Landmark Theater and colloquially known as "The Mosque"; designed by Marcellus E. Wright Sr. in association with Charles M. Robinson and Charles Custer Robinson in 1925 and completed in 1926.
5	Masonic Temple (Richmond, Virginia)		1888-93 built 1983 NRHP-listed	101-107 W. Broad St. 37°32′46″N 77°26′37″W	Richmond, Virginia	An 1888 building that is asserted to be the finest example of Richardsonian Romanesque style architecture in Virginia, and, at its time of construction, to be "one of the 'most magnificent examples of modern architecture in the South.'"
6	Mason's Hall (Richmond, Virginia)		1785-1787 built 1973 NRHP-listed	1807 E. Franklin St. 37°31′59″N 77°25′36″W	Richmond, Virginia	The oldest building built as a Masonic meetingplace and in continuous use for that purpose in the United States.

=== Washington ===
	Building	Image	Dates	Location	City, State	Description
1	Auburn Masonic Temple	Auburn Masonic Temple, June 2020	1923-24 built 2015 NRHP-listed	10 Auburn Way South; 47°18′26″N 122°13′32″W	Auburn, Washington	Building of King Solomon Lodge No. 60, which was chartered in 1890. Described as "an unusually sophisticated, urban version of fraternal architecture for a town of less than 3,500."
2	Centralia Masonic Lodge		1923 built 2002 NRHP CP-listed	218 N. Pearl	Centralia, Washington	Included in Centralia Downtown Historic District
3	Masonic Temple (Ellensburg, Washington)		1890 built 1977 NRHP CP	111 West Sixth Ave; 46.99779°N 120.54822°W	Ellensburg, Washington	Contributing in NRHP-listed Downtown Ellensburg Historic District
4	Falls City Masonic Hall		1895 built 2004 NRHP-listed	4304 337th Place SE; 47°34′0.65″N 121°53′25.76″W	Fall City, Washington	
5	Masonic Hall (Farmington, Washington)		1908 built 1987 NRHP-listed	Corner of Main and Second Sts. 47°5′25″N 117°2′40″W	Farmington, Washington	"vernacular Neoclassical"
6	Masonic Temple-Hoquiam		1922 built 2007 NRHP-listed	510 8th St. 46°58′38″N 123°53′14″W	Hoquiam, Washington	Beaux Arts style
7	Masonic Lodge Building (Kirkland, Washington)		1891 built 1982 NRHP-listed	47°40′51″N 122°12′29″W	Kirkland, Washington	Victorian Romanesque
8	North Bend Masonic Hall		1912 built	119 North Bend Way; 47°29′42″N 121°47′11″W	North Bend, Washington	A King County landmark, built in 1912
9	Masonic Temple (Port Angeles, Washington)		1921 built 1989 NRHP-listed	48°6′12.50″N 123°26′12.50″W	Port Angeles, Washington	Classical Revival
10	Green Lake Masonic Lodge		1921-24 built	307 NE Maple Leaf PL NE; 47.68070°N 122.32571°W	Green Lake, Seattle, Washington	Designed by Bebb and Gould.
11	Prince Hall Masonic Temple (Seattle)		1925 built 2018 Seattle landmark	306 24th Ave S 47.60020°N 122.30084°W	Seattle, Washington	A designated Seattle landmark. Originally "Rainier Masonic Temple".
12	Queen Anne Masonic Lodge			1608 4th Avenue West	Seattle, Washington	
13	Washington Hall (Seattle, Washington)		1908 built	153 14th Avenue, at E. Fir Street; 47°36′10.22″N 122°18′52.68″W	Seattle, Washington	A Mission Revival home of a Sons of Haiti masonic lodge
14	Skykomish Masonic Hall		1924 built		Skykomish, Washington	A King County landmark, built in 1924
15	Masonic Temple		1905 built 1925 Expanded; 1976 NRHP CP-listed	1110 W. Riverside Ave	Spokane, Washington	Classical Revival. Expanded in 1924–25 to present a 222 feet (68 m) colonnaded facade. Included in Riverside Avenue Historic District.
16	Masonic Temple Building-Temple Theater		1927 built 1993 NRHP-listed	47 St. Helens Ave. 47°15′43″N 122°26′39″W	Tacoma, Washington	Renaissance Revival
17	Masonic Lodge		1921 built 2004 NRHP CP	260 Southeast Sussex, East; 46.85734°N 122.85337°W	Tenino, Washington	The lodge was granted a charter in 1892. Built in 1921. Included in Tenino Downtown Historic District.
18	Burton Masonic Hall		1894 built		Vashon Island, Washington	Built in 1894, a county and/or local landmark
19	Masonic Temple (Yakima, Washington)		1911 built 1996 NRHP-listed	321 E. Yakima Ave. 46°36′13″N 120°30′2″W	Yakima, Washington	Second Empire

(compare to 11 in Category:Masonic buildings in Washington (state))

=== West Virginia ===
	Building	Image	Dates	Location	City, State	Description
1	Masonic Temple (Fairmont, West Virginia)		1906 built 1993 NRHP-listed	320 Jefferson St. 39°29′8″N 80°8′34″W	Fairmont, West Virginia	Beaux Arts
2	Masonic Temple (Parkersburg, West Virginia)		1915 built 1982 NRHP-listed	900 Market St. 39°16′4″N 81°33′22″W	Parkersburg, West Virginia	Classical Revival
3	Masonic Temple-Watts, Ritter, Wholesale Drygoods Company Building		1914 built 1993 NRHP-listed	1100-1108 E. Third Ave. 38°25′22″N 82°26′28″W	Huntington, West Virginia	Early Commercial style
4	Literary Hall		1886 built 1973 NRHP-listed	West Main & North High Streets; 39.342249°N 78.756591°W	Romney, West Virginia	

=== Wisconsin ===
	Building	Image	Dates	Location	City, State	Description
1	Masonic Temple (Appleton, Wisconsin)		1923 built 1985 NRHP-listed	44°15′44″N 88°24′5″W	Appleton, Wisconsin	Now known as The History Museum at the Castle, this is a Tudor Revival building.
2	Masonic Temple (Ashland, Wisconsin)		Built in the 1880s	522 Main Street West	Ashland, Wisconsin	Still home of the local Masonic Lodge, also houses a pharmacy on the lower level.
3	Masonic Temple (Beloit, Wisconsin)		Built in the 1840s	229 West Grand Ave.	Beloit, Wisconsin	Still home of the local Masonic Lodge.
4	Eau Claire Masonic Center		1927 built 1988 NRHP-listed	616 Graham Ave. 44°48′27″N 91°29′53″W	Eau Claire, Wisconsin	Classical Revival
5	Eau Claire Masonic Temple		1899 built 2007 NRHP-listed	317-319 S Barstow & 306 Main Sts. 44°48′37″N 91°29′54″W	Eau Claire, Wisconsin	Romanesque building.
6	Madison Masonic Temple		1923 built 1990 NRHP-listed	301 Wisconsin Ave. 43°4′39″N 89°23′12″W	Madison, Wisconsin	Classical Revival
7	Excelsior Masonic Temple		Built 1923	2422 West National Avenue	Milwaukee, Wisconsin	Classical Revival; designed by architect Richard Oberst. Has been deemed NRHP-eligible but not listed due to owner objection
8	Kilbourn Masonic Temple		1911 built 1986 NRHP-listed	827 N. Eleventh St. 43°2′26″N 87°55′35″W	Milwaukee, Wisconsin	Classical Revival
9	Tripoli Shrine Temple		1919 built 1986 NRHP-listed	3000 W. Wisconsin Ave. 43°2′21″N 87°57′5″W	Milwaukee, Wisconsin	
10	Wisconsin Consistory Building		1936 built 1994 NRHP-listed	790 N. Van Buren St. 43°2′29″N 87°54′8″W	Milwaukee, Wisconsin	Art Deco
10.5	Neillsville Masonic Temple Lodge No. 163		1928 built 2004 NRHP-listed	316 Hewett St. 44°33′40″N 90°35′49″W	Neillsville, Wisconsin	
11	Oregon Masonic Lodge		1898 built 1992 NRHP-listed	117-119 S. Main St. 42°55′33″N 89°23′6″W	Oregon, Wisconsin	Late Victorian, "High Victorian Eclectic" style
12	Sparta Masonic Temple		1923 built 1987 NRHP-listed	200 W. Main St. 43°56′41″N 90°48′45″W	Sparta, Wisconsin	Classical Revival, Prairie School Later operated as Monroe County Museum.
13	Masonic Temple Building (Viroqua, Wisconsin)		1921 built 2000 NRHP-listed	116 S. Main St. 43°33′21″N 90°53′21″W	Viroqua, Wisconsin	Classical Revival
14	Masonic Temple (Watertown, Wisconsin)		1906 built 1998 NRHP CP-listed	2-6 E. Main St. 43.194517°N 88.724582°W	Watertown, Wisconsin	Part of Main Street Commercial Historic District

=== Wyoming ===
	Building	Image	Dates	Location	City, State	Description
1	Masonic Temple (Casper, Wyoming)		1914 built 2005 NRHP-listed	105 N. Center St. 42°51′1″N 106°19′27″W	Casper, Wyoming	Late 19th and Early 20th Century American Movements, Early Commercial architecture
2	Masonic Temple (Cheyenne, Wyoming)		1901 built 1984 NRHP-listed	1820 Capitol Ave. 41°8′6″N 104°49′0″W	Cheyenne, Wyoming	Late 19th and 20th Century Revivals, Second Renaissance Revival
3	Masonic Temple (Laramie, Wyoming)			407 E. Ivinson Ave. 41.31213°N 105.59162°W	Laramie, Wyoming	Greek Revival architecture, documented by HABS.
4	Masonic Temple (Rock Springs, Wyoming)		1912 built 1994 CP-listed	218 B Street; 41°35′5″N 109°13′14″W	Rock Springs, Wyoming	

== Federal district ==
=== District of Columbia ===
	Building	Image	Dates	Location	City, State	Description
1	Almas Temple		1929 built	1315 K St NW; 38.902940°N 77.03051°W	Washington, D.C.	Moorish Revival style
2	House of the Temple		1911-1915 built	38°54′49.68″N 77°2′9.24″W	Washington, D.C.	Constructed as, and continues to be the headquarters building for the Supreme Council, Scottish Rite (Southern Jurisdiction, USA).
2	International Temple of the Order of the Eastern Star		1909 built 1973 NRHP-listed	38°54′44″N 77°2′30″W	Washington, D.C.	Built in 1909 for Perry Belmont and sold to the Order of the Eastern Star in 1935.
3	Julius Lansburgh Furniture Co., Inc. "Old Masonic Temple"		1867-1870 built 1921 sold 1974 NRHP-listed	38°53′50″N 77°1′26″W	Washington, D.C.	Originally constructed to contain several Masonic lodge rooms and offices. The first-floor stores were leased, and a grand ballroom on the second-floor was rented out. The building was purchased in 1921 by Julius Lansburgh and operated as a furniture store until 1970, it was listed as an historic building in 1974. Renovated in 2000, it now serves as the headquarters of the Gallup Organization.
4	Masonic Temple (Washington, D.C.)		1903 built 1987 NRHP-listed	801 Thirteenth St., NW; 34°54′50″N 77°2′9″W	Washington, D.C.	Classical Revival building later used as a museum by the National Museum of Women in the Arts
5	Prince Hall Masonic Temple (Washington, D.C.)		1922 built 1983 NRHP-listed	1000 U St., NW; 38°55′0″N 77°1′35″W	Washington, D.C.	Designed by African American architect Albert I. Cassell

== Insular areas ==
=== Puerto Rico ===
List of masonic buildings in Puerto Rico, an insular area of the United States, include:

	Building	Image	Dates	Location	City, State	Description
1	Logia Adelphia		1912 built 1986 NRHP-listed	64E Sol Street; 18.200208°N 67.138817°W	Mayagüez, Puerto Rico	Designed by architect Sabas Honore, with elaborate and well-preserved front facade. In 1984, the building was still being used by Adelphia Lodge #1, the oldest Masonic Lodge located in Mayagüez.
2	Logia Masónica Hijos de la Luz		1894 built 1988 NRHP-listed	José Celso Barbosa Avenue; 18.031929°N 66.848455°W	Yauco, Puerto Rico	Probably the oldest Masonic building in Puerto Rico.

== See also ==
- List of Masonic buildings, for all other notable ones world-wide
