= Masonic Temple (Sandusky, Ohio) =

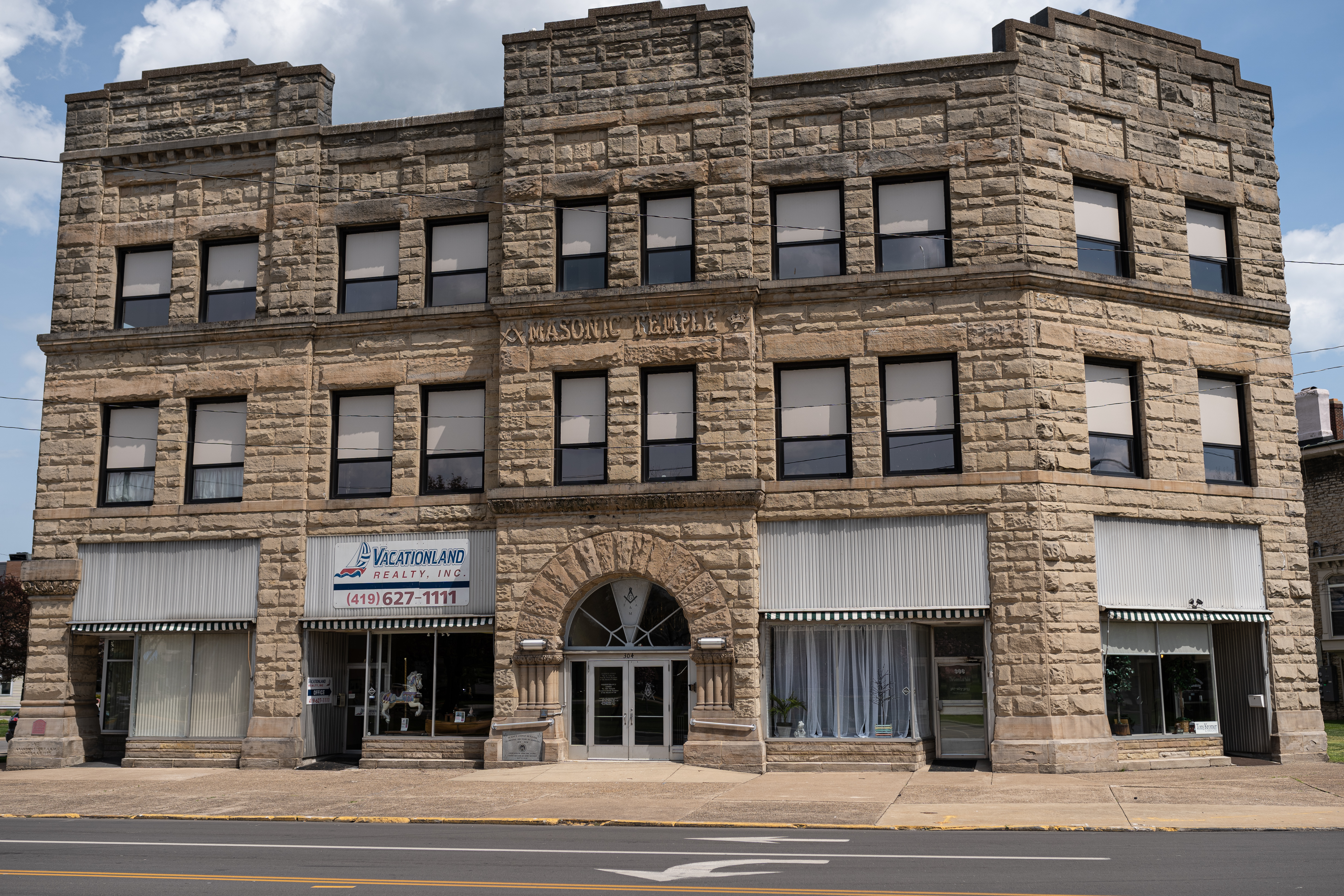

- Location within Ohio
- 41°27′19.19″N 82°42′32.01″W
- Location: 304 Wayne St., Sandusky, Ohio

History
- Built: 1889

Site notes
- Area: 0.9 acres (0.36 ha)
- Architect(s): Lindsay, H.C.; Feick, Adam
- Architectural style: Romanesque

The Masonic Temple in Sandusky, Ohio, also known as Science Lodge No. 50 F & A M, was built in 1889.

It was covered in a study of historic resources of Sandusky, and was deemed significant in the social history of the city.

It was nominated for listing on the National Register of Historic Places in 1983, and was determined to be NRHP-eligible, but formal listing was prevented by owner objection (reference number 83004653; date of January 20, 1983; listing status "Determined Eligible/Owner Objection").

The architecture is Romanesque; architects were H.C. Lindsay and Adam Feick. The property's area at time of NRHP nomination was 0.9 acres (0.36 ha).
