= Excelsior Masonic Temple =

Church in Wisconsin, United States

Coordinates: 43°01′21.8″N 87°56′40.1″W

The Excelsior Masonic Temple (now the Life Restoration Church) is a historic building located at 2422 West National Avenue in Milwaukee, Wisconsin. Built in 1923, and designed in the Classical Revival style by architect Richard Oberst, the building was originally constructed as a meeting hall for Excelsior Lodge #175 F.&A.M (a local Masonic Lodge that is no longer in existence). The building was sold by the Lodge in the 1990s, and is now used by a local church.

The building is deemed to be eligible for listing on the National Register of Historic Places, but was not listed due to owner objection.
