= Phoenix Masonic Lodge No. 8 =

- U.S. National Register of Historic Places
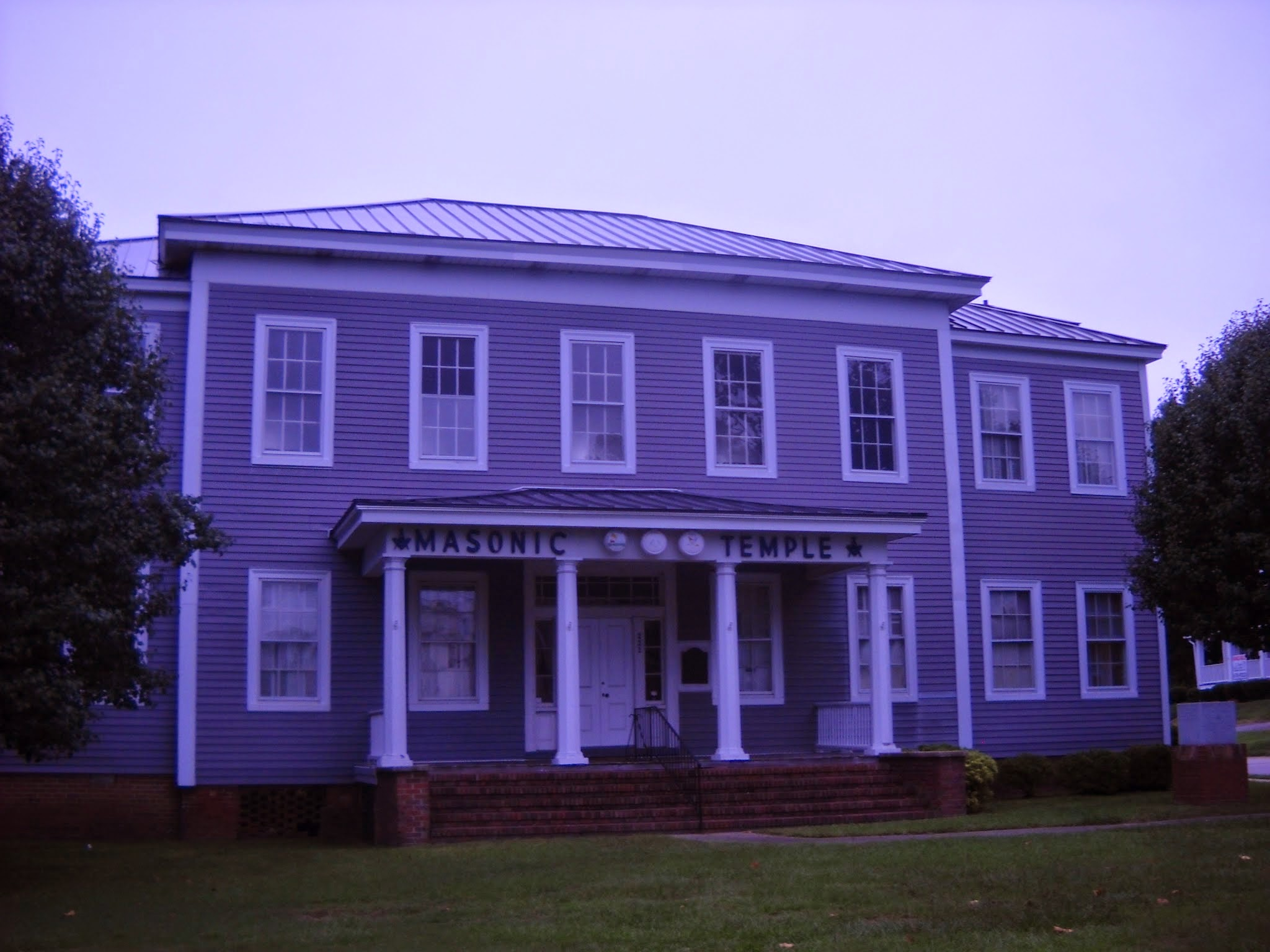
- Phoenix Masonic Lodge No. 8, September 2014

- Location within North Carolina Location within the United States
- Location: 221 Mason St., Fayetteville, North Carolina
- Coordinates: 35°3′21″N 78°52′48″W
- Area: less than one acre
- Built: c. 1855
- Architectural style: Greek Revival
- MPS: Fayetteville MRA
- NRHP reference No.: 83001868
- Added to NRHP: July 7, 1983

Phoenix Masonic Lodge No. 8 is a historic Masonic Lodge located at Fayetteville, Cumberland County, North Carolina. It was built about 1855, and is a two-story, five-bay, Greek Revival style frame building with a hip roof. It has flanked by wings added 1948–1950 and features a front porch supported by octagonal columns.

It was listed on the National Register of Historic Places in 1983.
