= Masonic Hall (Gulfport, Mississippi) =

Historic building in Mississippi, United States

Coordinates: 30.373874°N 89.100413°W

- Location: 1905 32nd Avenue, Gulfport, Mississippi

The Masonic Hall in Gulfport, Mississippi, is a historic building that was designated a Mississippi Landmark in 2008.

Although there is a sign on the building indicating that it belongs to Rectitude Lodge No. 323 (Prince Hall Affiliation), none of the Prince Hall Grand Lodges in Mississippi lists a "Rectitude Lodge" on their current rosters.
