= Adoniram Masonic Lodge =

Masonic lodge in North Carolina, U.S.

- U.S. National Register of Historic Places
- Location within North Carolina Location within the United States
- Location: Jct. of NC 1410 and NC 1300, near Cornwall, North Carolina
- Coordinates: 36°28′46″N 78°39′58″W
- Area: 1 acre (0.40 ha)
- Built: 1917
- Architectural style: Masonic lodge
- MPS: Granville County MPS
- NRHP reference No.: 88001253
- Added to NRHP: August 31, 1988

Adoniram Masonic Lodge is a historic Masonic lodge located near Cornwall, Granville County, North Carolina. It was built in 1917, and is a two-story, four-bay, one-room-deep, I-house style frame building. It features a full-width porch with enclosed end bays adorned with turned posts and feathered cut brackets. It housed a public school between 1917 and 1923. The building was moved to its present location in 1948.

It was listed on the National Register of Historic Places in 1988.
