= North Bend Masonic Hall =

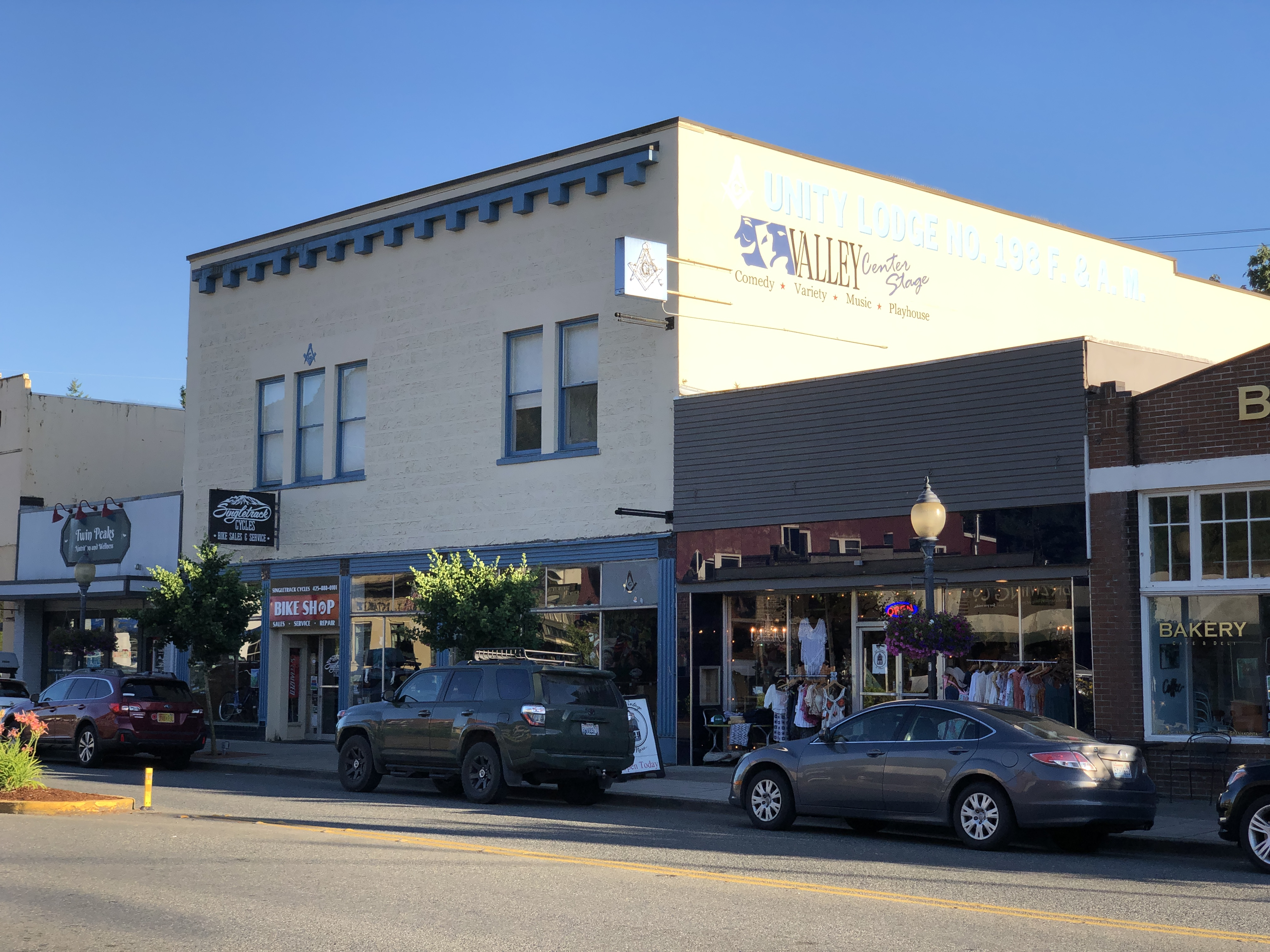
- Location: 119 North Bend Way, North Bend, Washington
- Coordinates: 47°29′42″N 121°47′11″W
- Built: 1912

North Bend Masonic Hall was built in 1912 in North Bend, Washington. It is a King County landmark.

It is a two-story concrete building designed with commercial space on the first floor and meeting space above. The second floor was used for many community events including Saturday night dances. The exterior was given an Alpine appearance in the 1970s; it was restored to its 1920s appearance in 1998.

It is the current meeting place of Unity Lodge No. 198.
