= Masonic Hall (Lexington, Mississippi) =

Historic building in Lexington, Mississippi, United States

Coordinates: 33.112421°N 90.053565°W

Masonic Temple
- Location: 126 Court Square, Lexington, Mississippi

The Masonic Temple in Lexington, Mississippi, is a historic building that was designated a Mississippi Landmark in 2003.

A three-story brick commercial building, the first story is leased for commercial use and the second for offices. The third story was originally used as a meeting hall for Lexington Lodge No. 24, but the lodge now meets in a different location.
