= Skykomish Masonic Hall =

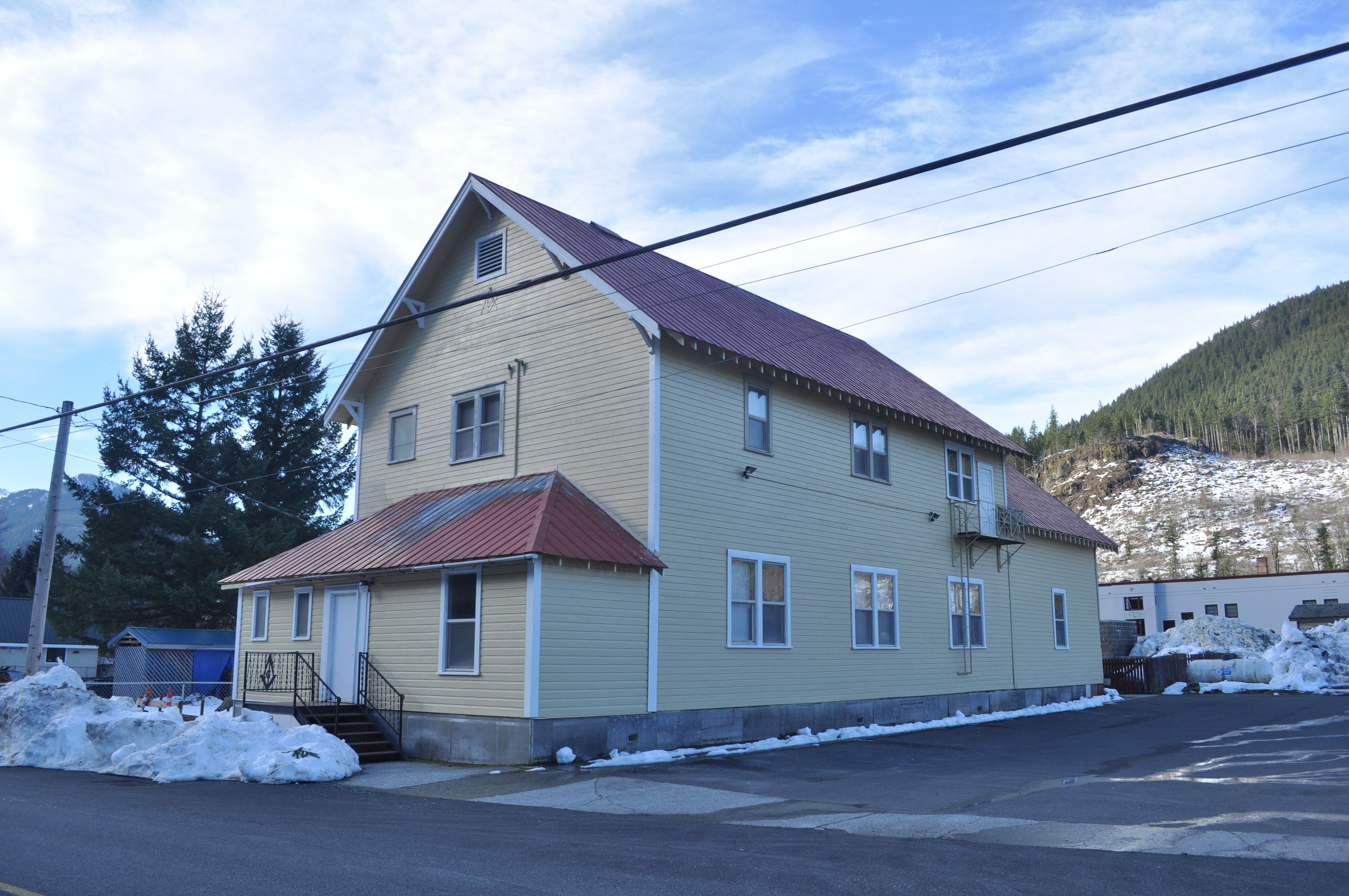
- Location: Skykomish, Washington
- Coordinates: 47°42′30″N 121°21′43″W
- Built: 1924

Skykomish Masonic Hall in Skykomish, Washington was built in 1924. It is a King County landmark.
