= Lafayette Lodge No. 79 =

- U.S. National Register of Historic Places
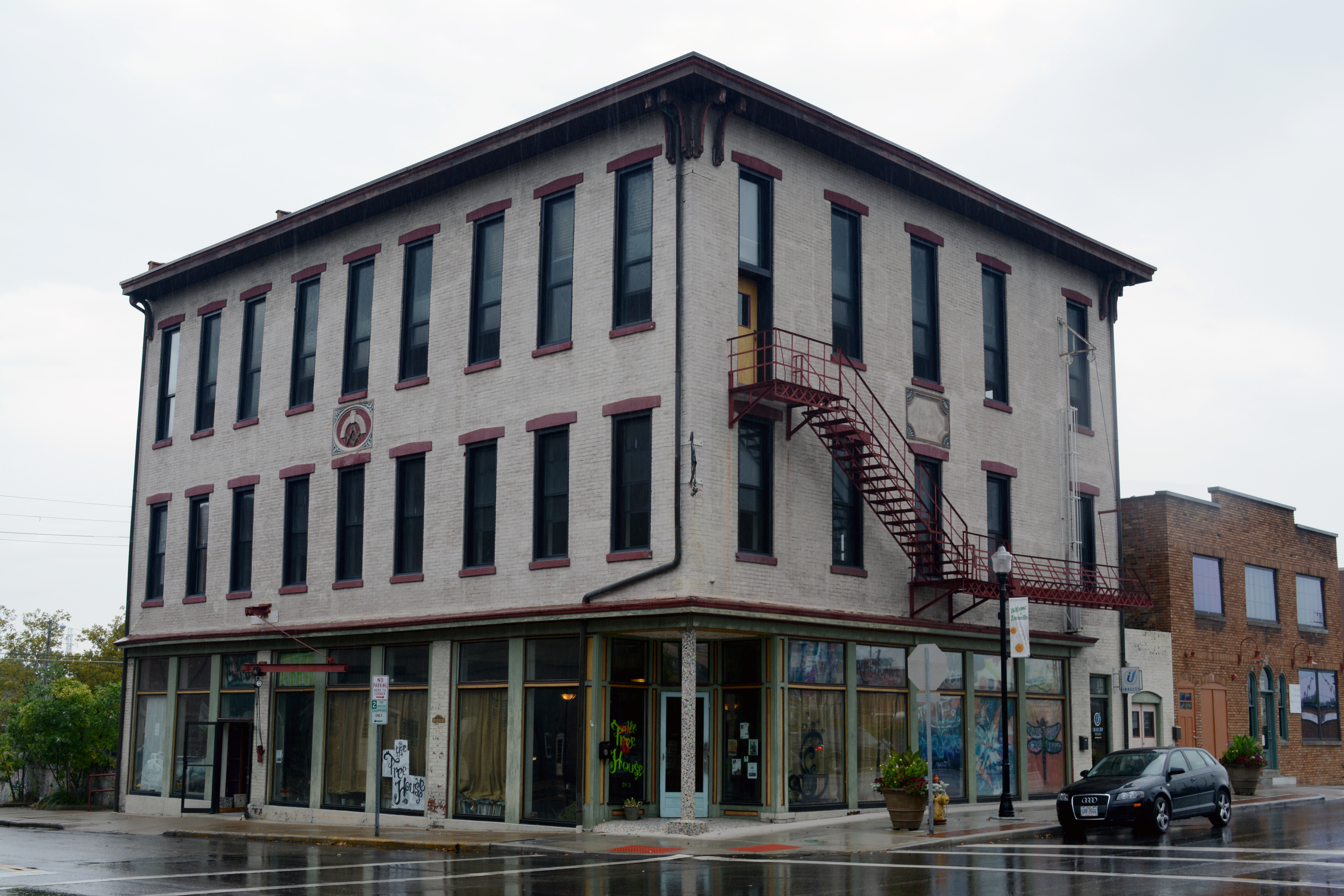

- Location within Ohio Location within the United States
- Location: 3867 Northpoint Drive, Zanesville, Ohio
- Coordinates: 39°56′32″N 82°00′28″W
- Area: less than one acre
- Built: 1857
- Architect: Hall, William; Et al.
- NRHP reference No.: 78002163
- Added to NRHP: September 13, 1978

The Lafayette Lodge No. 79, at 3867 Northpoint Dr. in Zanesville, Ohio, was built in 1991.

It is home of Masonic local chapter, La Fayette Lodge No. 79 F&AM and The Lodge of Amity No. 5, F&AM.

Further information about the building is available within the Ohio Historic Places Dictionary.
