= National Register of Historic Places listings in Whitman County, Washington =

Location of Whitman County in Washington

This list presents the full set of buildings, structures, objects, sites, or districts designated on the National Register of Historic Places in Whitman County, Washington, and offers brief descriptive information about each of them. The National Register recognizes places of national, state, or local historic significance across the United States. Out of over 90,000 National Register sites nationwide, Washington is home to approximately 1,500, and 37 of those are found in Whitman County.

This National Park Service list is complete through NPS recent listings posted May 1, 2026.

== Current listings ==
	Name on the Register	Image	Date listed	Location	City or town	Description
1	J. C. Barron Flour Mill	J. C. Barron Flour Mill	February 8, 1978 (#78002788)	1st and Jackson Sts. 47°07′49″N 117°14′27″W	Oakesdale	
2	Canyon Grain Bin and Chutes	Canyon Grain Bin and Chutes	September 22, 1988 (#88001539)	E of County Rd. 7030, 2 mi (3.2 km). NE of jct. County Rds. 7030 and 7010; 46°37′46″N 118°03′12″W	Hay	
3	Central Service Station	Central Service Station	April 24, 2007 (#07000365)	534 Whitman St. 47°14′10″N 117°22′07″W	Rosalia	
4	College Hill Historic District	College Hill Historic District	November 3, 2006 (#06000701)	Roughly bounded by Stadium Way, B St., Howard St., and Indiana St. 46°44′19″N 117°10′13″W	Pullman	
5	Collins House and Granary	Collins House and Granary	July 30, 1974 (#74001993)	SE of Uniontown off U.S. 195; 46°28′26″N 117°03′00″W	Uniontown	Also known as the O. M. Collins House.
6	Cordova Theater	Cordova Theater	March 18, 2004 (#04000200)	135 N. Grand Ave. 46°43′57″N 117°10′54″W	Pullman	
7	F Street Bridge	F Street Bridge	July 16, 1982 (#82004308)	Spans Palouse River; 46°54′36″N 117°04′07″W	Palouse	Historic Bridges and Tunnels in Washington TR
8	Florence Ferguson House	Florence Ferguson House	April 19, 2011 (#10000996)	504 North Mill Street; 46°53′02″N 117°21′48″W	Colfax	
9	Edwin H. Hanford House	Edwin H. Hanford House	May 15, 1986 (#86001068)	North of WA 217; 47°07′33″N 117°13′25″W	Oakesdale	
10	Gustave Heilsberg Farm	Gustave Heilsberg Farm	September 22, 1988 (#88001534)	Rt. 2; 46°48′23″N 117°29′14″W	Colfax	
11	Henley Site	Henley Site	September 19, 1977 (#77001369)	Address Restricted	Hay	
12	Holy Trinity Episcopal Church	Holy Trinity Episcopal Church	March 30, 2005 (#05000249)	105 E. Alder St. 46°54′50″N 117°04′37″W	Palouse	
13	Interior Grain Tramway	Interior Grain Tramway	September 22, 1988 (#88001538)	Snake River Canyon, 2 mi (3.2 km). N of Wawawai; 46°39′43″N 117°22′38″W	Pullman	
14	Interstate Telephone Co. - Pullman	Interstate Telephone Co. - Pullman	March 12, 2026 (#100012802)	125 NW Olsen Street; 46°43′52″N 117°10′55″W	Pullman	
15	T. A. Leonard Barn	T. A. Leonard Barn	May 2, 1986 (#86000963)	S side of Old Moscow Hwy. 46°42′16″N 117°07′23″W	Pullman	
16	Manning-Rye Covered Bridge	Manning-Rye Covered Bridge	July 16, 1982 (#82004307)	Spans Palouse River; 46°55′42″N 117°24′55″W	Colfax	Open top covered bridge converted from a railway bridge. Also known as the Harpole Bridge. Historic Bridges and Tunnels in Washington TR; Destroyed by range fire September 7–8, 2020.
17	Masonic Hall	Masonic Hall	February 12, 1987 (#87000057)	Corner of Main and Second Sts. 47°05′25″N 117°02′40″W	Farmington	
18	R. C. McCroskey House	R. C. McCroskey House	November 21, 1974 (#74001992)	4th and Manring Sts. 47°00′46″N 117°08′32″W	Garfield	Residence of R. C. McCroskey
19	McGregor Ranch	McGregor Ranch	September 22, 1988 (#88001535)	6 mi (9.7 km). S of Hooper; 46°42′53″N 118°04′27″W	Hooper	
20	Northern Pacific Railway Depot - Pullman	Northern Pacific Railway Depot - Pullman	August 26, 2019 (#100004328)	330 N. Grand Ave. 46°43′53″N 117°10′45″W	Pullman	
21	Oakesdale City Hall	Oakesdale City Hall	April 29, 1993 (#93000360)	E. 101 Steptoe; 47°07′42″N 117°14′29″W	Oakesdale	
22	Palouse Main Street Historic District	Palouse Main Street Historic District	May 8, 1986 (#86001026)	Main St. between K and Mary Sts. 46°54′36″N 117°04′31″W	Palouse	
23	James A. Perkins House	James A. Perkins House	December 11, 1972 (#72001283)	N. 623 Perkins St. 46°53′15″N 117°22′00″W	Colfax	
24	Pullman High School	Pullman High School	August 6, 1998 (#98001017)	115 NW State St. 46°43′52″N 117°10′56″W	Pullman	Now the Gladish Community & Cultural Center.
25	Rosalia Railroad Bridge	Rosalia Railroad Bridge	July 16, 1982 (#82004310)	WA 271; 47°13′15″N 117°21′24″W	Rosalia	Historic Bridges and Tunnels in Washington TR
26	St. Boniface Church, Convent and Rectory	St. Boniface Church, Convent and Rectory	December 9, 1994 (#94001433)	206 St. Boniface St. 46°32′25″N 117°05′27″W	Uniontown	
27	Star Route and Palouse Street Brick Road	Star Route and Palouse Street Brick Road	April 15, 2014 (#14000168)	Part of NE Maple and Palouse streets 46°43′50″N 117°10′41″W	Pullman	
28	Max Steinke Barn	Max Steinke Barn	September 22, 1988 (#88001536)	Rt. 1, Box 130; 47°06′56″N 117°40′25″W	St. John	
29	Steptoe Battlefield Site	Steptoe Battlefield Site	May 6, 1976 (#76001924)	SE of Rosalia; 47°13′46″N 117°21′49″W	Rosalia	
30	Stevens Hall	Stevens Hall	March 26, 1979 (#79002567)	Campus and Administration Sts. 46°43′54″N 117°09′55″W	Pullman	
31	William Swain House	William Swain House	July 28, 1994 (#94000801)	W. 315 Main St. 46°43′50″N 117°11′05″W	Pullman	1914-built American Craftsman style home of architect and eventual Pullman mayor William Swain.
32	Tekoa Grain Company Elevator & Flathouse	Tekoa Grain Company Elevator & Flathouse	September 22, 1988 (#88001537)	4 mi (6.4 km). W of Tekoa; 47°13′22″N 117°08′46″W	Lone Pine	
33	Albert W. Thompson Hall	Albert W. Thompson Hall	March 1, 1973 (#73001894)	Administration Rd. on Washington State University campus 46°43′53″N 117°09′57″W	Pullman	
34	United Presbyterian Church	United Presbyterian Church	December 7, 1989 (#89002095)	430 Maple St. 46°43′54″N 117°10′32″W	Pullman	
35	U.S. Post Office – Colfax Main	U.S. Post Office – Colfax Main	May 30, 1991 (#91000643)	211 S. Main St. 46°52′45″N 117°21′52″W	Colfax	
36	U.S. Post Office – Pullman	U.S. Post Office – Pullman	August 21, 2003 (#03000810)	SE 245 Paradise St. 46°43′44″N 117°10′46″W	Pullman	
37	Whitman County Library	Whitman County Library	August 4, 2021 (#100006803)	102 South Main St. 46°52′51″N 117°21′53″W	Colfax	

== Former listings ==
	Name on the Register	Image	Date listed	Date removed	Location	City or town	Description
1	Elberton Historic District	Elberton Historic District	May 26, 1977 (#77001368)	July 16, 1990	Off WA 272 at Palouse River	Elberton	Most buildings demolished in 1989.
2	McClure Bridge	McClure Bridge	July 16, 1982 (#82004309)	July 16, 1990	Spans Palouse River	Palouse	

== See also ==
- National Register of Historic Places listings in Washington state
- Listings in neighboring counties: Adams, Asotin, Benewah, Columbia, Franklin, Garfield, Latah, Lincoln, Nez Perce, Spokane
- Historic preservation
- History of Washington (state)
- Index of Washington (state)-related articles
