= Masonic Hall (disambiguation) =

A Masonic Hall is the room or edifice where a Masonic Lodge meets.

Masonic Hall or Old Masonic Hall may also refer to:

== United States ==
- Masonic Hall (Wickenburg, Arizona)
- Old Masonic Hall (Benicia, California), in Solano County
- Masonic Hall (Mendocino, California)
- Grand Opera House (Wilmington, Delaware), also known as Masonic Hall and Grand Theater
- Masonic Hall (Eastwood, Kentucky), in the Fisherville neighborhood of Louisville
- Masonic Hall-Federal Commissary Building, Smithland, Kentucky
- Masonic Hall (Augusta, Maine)
- Old Masonic Hall (Booneville, Mississippi)
- Masonic Hall (Carrollton, Mississippi)
- Masonic Hall (Gulfport, Mississippi)
- Masonic Hall (Hazlehurst, Mississippi)
- Masonic Hall (Lexington, Mississippi)
- Masonic Hall (Long Beach, Mississippi)
- Old Masonic Hall (Louisville, Mississippi)
- Pelahatchie City Hall and Masonic Hall, Pelahatchie, Mississippi
- Old Municipal Building and Masonic Hall, Shelby, Mississippi
- Masonic Hall (Manhattan), in New York City
- Masonic Hall (Waynesville, North Carolina)
- Old Masonic Hall (Bellville, Texas), in Austin County
- Masonic Hall (Farmington, Washington)

== Other countries ==
- Albany Masonic Hall, Australia
- Rockhampton Masonic Hall, Australia
- Townsville Masonic Hall, Australia
- Yangan Masonic Hall, Australia
- Masonic Hall, York, Australia
- Masonic Hall (Whitewood, Saskatchewan), Canada
- Cheltenham Masonic Hall, England
- Masonic Hall, Sheringham, England
- Masonic Hall, Taunton, England
- Masonic Hall, Monmouth, Wales
- Masonic Hall, Duncombe Place, in York, England

== See also ==
- List of Masonic buildings
- Masonic Temple (disambiguation)
- Masonic Lodge (disambiguation)
- Masonic Building (disambiguation)
