= Red Road =

Red Road, Redroad or The Red Road may refer to:

== Places ==
- Red Road (Hawaii), Hawaii Route 137, a coastal highway on the island of Hawaii
- Red Road (Kolkata), a boulevard in Kolkata, India
- Red Road (Miami), a street in Miami, Florida
- Red Road Flats, a housing estate in Glasgow built in the 1960s and demolished from 2010–2015

== Art, entertainment, and media ==
- Red Road (film), a 2006 Scottish film by Andrea Arnold, set in Glasgow
- The Red Road Ensemble, musicians who played on Robbie Robertson's 1994 album, Music for The Native Americans
- The Red Road (album), a 1993 album by Bill Miller
- The Red Road, one woman show and 2006 album by Arigon Starr
- "Red Road-U", a song from the 2016 Indian film Jil Jung Juk
- Redroad FM, a radio station in Kiveton Park, Sheffield, England
- The Red Road (TV series), a 2014 drama that airs on SundanceTV

== Other uses ==
- The red road, a modern metaphor for a spiritual path inspired by Native American religions

== See also ==
- Red Brick Road, London advertising agency
- Red Brick Roads, a block in Pullman, Washington, USA
- Red Dirt Road, a country music album by Brooks & Dunn
  - Red Dirt Road (song), a song on the album
- Red Rock Road, Nevada State Route 159
- Red Rock Scenic Road, Arizona State Route 179
