= Junior Warden =

Junior warden may refer to:

- one of the churchwardens in the vestry of an Anglican church
- one of the officers of a Masonic lodge

== See also ==
- Senior Warden (disambiguation)
