= Star routes =

Old type of postal route in the United States

Star routes is a term used in connection with the United States postal service and the contracting of mail delivery services. The term is defunct as of 1970, but still is occasionally used to refer to Highway Contract Routes (HCRs), which replaced the Star routes. The term is mostly used in connection with a series of scandals in the 1870s involving bribes to postal officials.

== Background ==
Prior to 1845, transportation of inland mail, other than by railroad, was given to bidders who offered stage or coach service.

This was abolished by act of Congress on March 3, 1845, which provided that the postmaster-general should lease all such contracts to the lowest bidder who tendered sufficient guarantee of faithful performance, without any conditions, except to provide for due celerity, certainty and security of transportation. These bids became known as "celerity, certainty and security bids" and were designated on the route registers by three stars (***), thus becoming known as "star routes".

== Star Route Frauds ==
The Star Route Frauds scandal involved a lucrative 19th century scheme whereby postal officials received bribes in exchange for awarding postal delivery contracts in southern and western areas.

An investigation into the Star Routes corruption took place under President James A. Garfield in 1881. Two previous congressional investigations into the Star Route frauds had occurred in 1872 and 1876 during the Grant administration. The 1872 investigation results had been tainted by bribery, while the 1876 investigation managed to shut down the Star Route frauds temporarily. A resurgence of graft took place in 1878 in the Hayes administration, continuing into the Garfield administration. Among the major players involved were some of the large contractors, Bradley Barlow, a former US Representative of Vermont, the Second Assistant Postmaster-General, some of the subordinates in the department, and Arkansas Senator Stephen W. Dorsey, who became Secretary of the Republican National Committee during James A. Garfield's 1880 presidential campaign. After Garfield's death by assassination, President Chester A. Arthur pursued the investigation. A federal prosecution and trial took place in 1882, which was finally able to shut down the postal ring.

Although the fraudulent scheme was widespread, there were few convictions. Many of the defendants in the Star Routes trials were successfully defended by noted lawyer and orator, Robert Ingersoll. Public disgust over the Star Routes graft served as an impetus for civil service reform and the passage of the Pendleton Civil Service Reform Act in 1883.

== Post-abolition ==
Star Routes, now known as Highway Contract Routes (or HCRs) as of 1970, have become a mode of delivering mail directly to customers. Historically, Highway Contract Routes were used rarely for mail delivery to households. An exception was in rural areas with less than one customer per mile.

In modern usage, HCRs can be used anywhere to deliver mail directly to customers. They are often used to deliver mail in growth areas such as new housing tracts. Some of these routes are being started in areas where there are as few as 20 deliveries per day.

Since 2000, the US Postal Service has added the term "Contract Delivery Service" (CDS) as their newest version of the Star Route. These routes are established to serve newly-created urban communities. CDS carriers do not transport mail, and are being used in an attempt to find delivery drivers who will work for less than USPS carrier wages. As of 2007, several thousand of these CDS routes have been created, with plans for far more.

Many contractors are no longer individuals wanting to transport mail between post offices, or to deliver mail in a remote community where they live. This new concentration of more urban contract routes has made it practical for businesses to bid on multiple contracts, and then seek workers who will work those routes for less money than the US Postal Service pays on each contract. The US Postal Service is still attempting to find an equilibrium between the dependability of career postal carriers and the cost savings of contractors acting as a temp agency.

There is some debate as to how much control the Postal Service can exercise over these contract routes and have them remain contractors. Exactly where the line is that will mark the difference between an HCR being a contractor and an employee is not clear.

== See also ==
- Historic Star Route
- Little Post Office
