= East Church Street–Starling Avenue Historic District =

Historic district in Virginia, United States

- U.S. National Register of Historic Places
- U.S. Historic district
- Virginia Landmarks Register
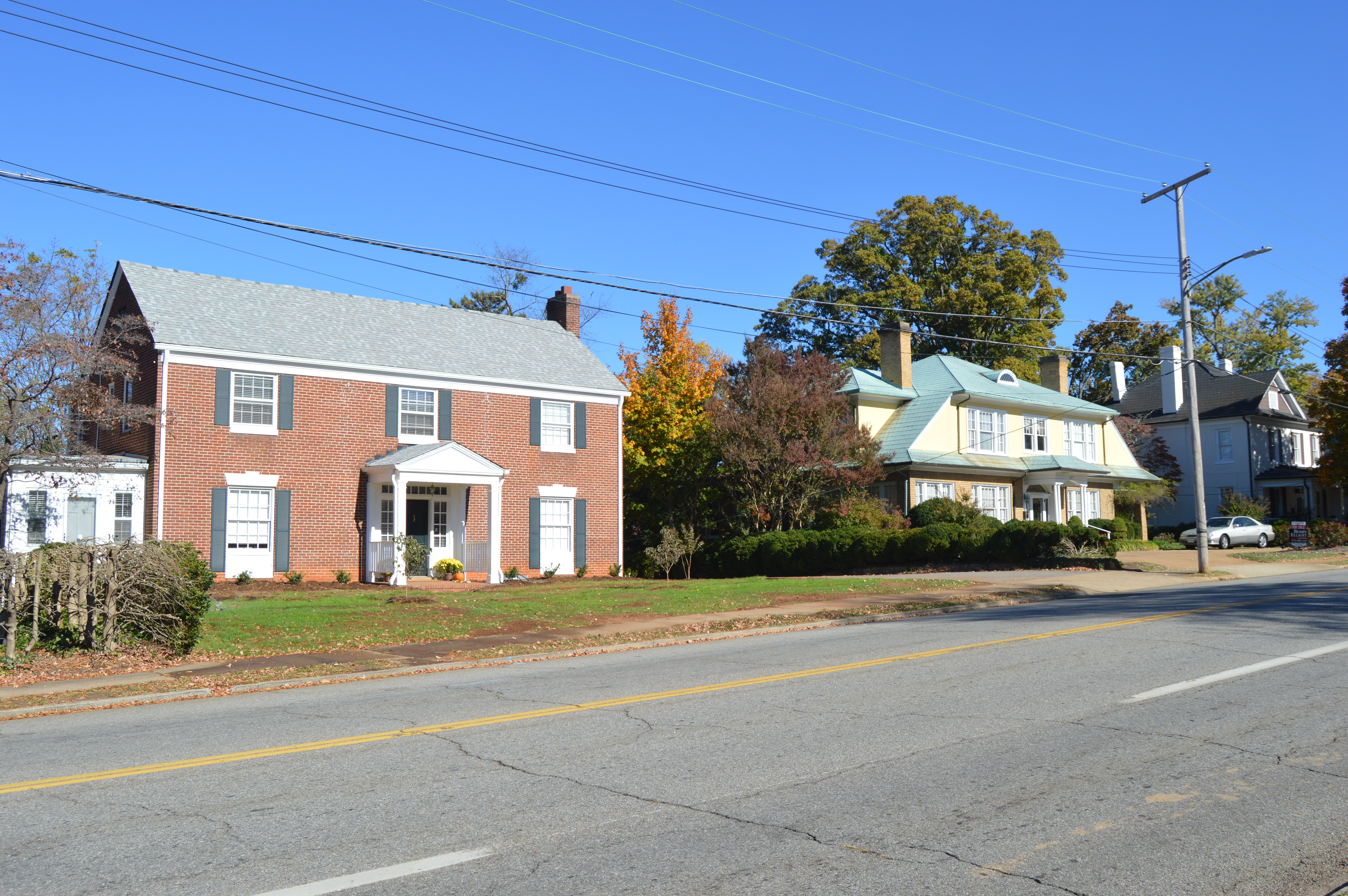
- Houses on Church Street

- Location within Virginia Location within the United States
- Location: Brown St., E. Church St., Cleveland Ave., Letcher Court, Market St. E, Scuffle Hill, Starling Ave., Martinsville, Virginia
- Coordinates: 36°41′12″N 79°51′57″W
- Area: 54 acres (22 ha)
- Architect: Barber, George Franklin; Caldwell and Eubank, et al.
- Architectural style: Colonial Revival, Tudor Revival, et al.
- NRHP reference No.: 06000805
- VLR No.: 120-5002

Significant dates
- Added to NRHP: September 6, 2006
- Designated VLR: June 8, 2006

East Church Street–Starling Avenue Historic District is a national historic district located at Martinsville, Virginia. It encompasses 117 contributing buildings, one contributing structure, and one contributing object in a residential section of Martinsville. The buildings range in date from the range in date from the mid-1880s to the mid-1950s and include notable examples of the Tudor Revival and Colonial Revival styles. Notable buildings include the James Cheshire House, the Obidiah Allen House, John W. Carter House (1896), Christ Episcopal Church (1890s), 209 Starling Avenue the "Simmons House" or the "Starling B" (1909), G.T. Lester House or the “Wedding Cake House” (1918), John W. Townes House (c. 1925), Vaughn M. Draper House (c. 1930), and Martinsville High School (1940) and Gymnasium Building (1928). Located in the district are the separately listed John Waddey Carter House, Scuffle Hill, and the Little Post Office.

It was listed on the National Register of Historic Places in 2006.
