= William Swain House =

- U.S. National Register of Historic Places
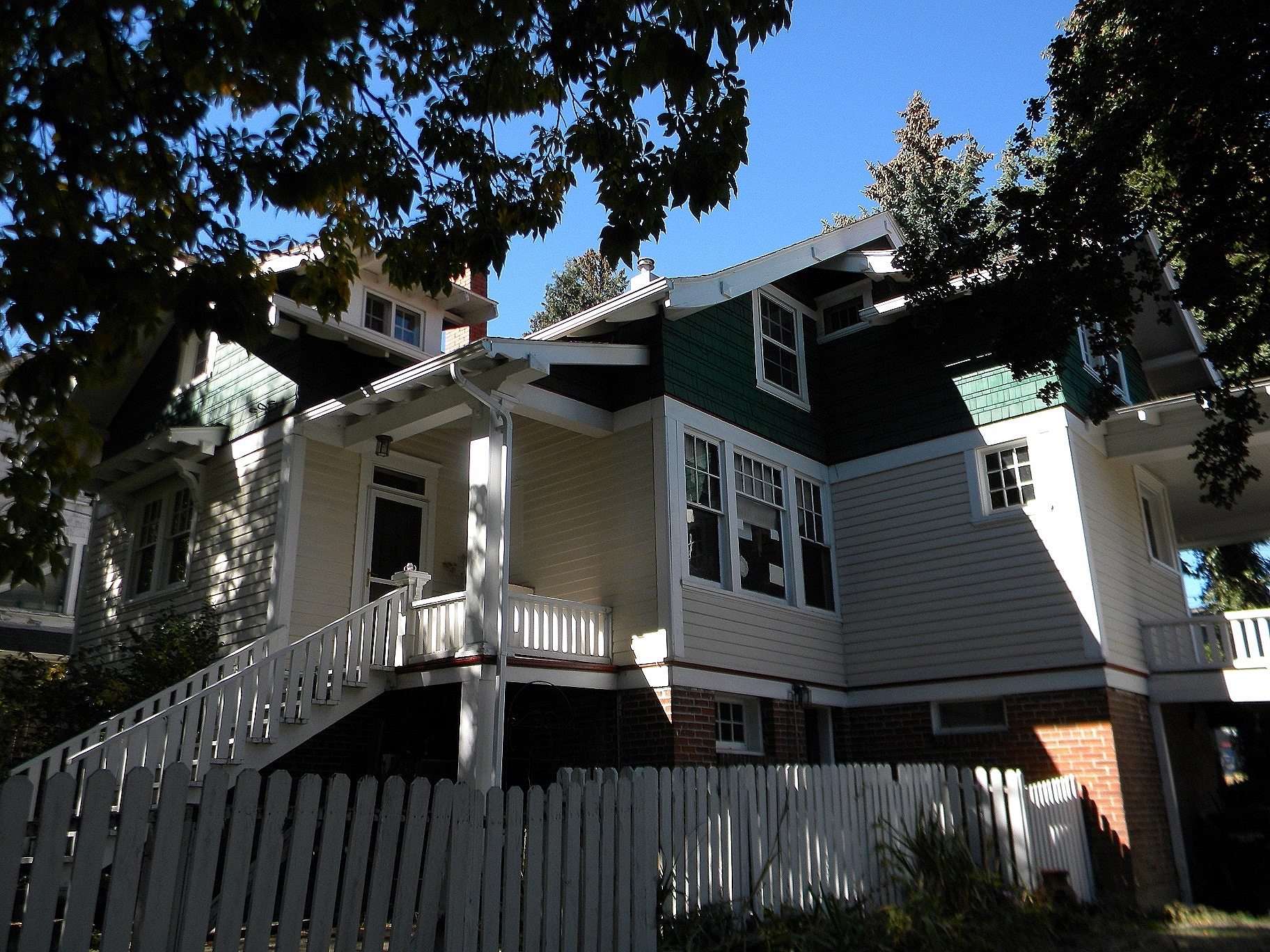

- Location within Washington (state) Location within the United States
- Location: 315 W. Main St., Pullman, Washington
- Coordinates: 46.73055°N 117.18470°W
- Area: less than one acre
- Built: 1914
- Architect: William Swaim
- Architectural style: Bungalow/craftsman
- NRHP reference No.: 94000801
- Added to NRHP: July 28, 1994

The William Swain House, at W. W. Main St. in Pullman, Washington, is an American Craftsman style bungalow house built in 1914. It was a home of architect William Swain who was elected mayor of Pullman in the year the house was completed. It was listed on the National Register of Historic Places in 1994.

It is a balloon-frame, spacious house on an east-facing slope.

== See also ==
- Pullman Flatiron Building, also designed by Swain and surviving in Pullman
- United Presbyterian Church (Pullman, Washington), NRHP-listed, also designed by Swain and surviving in Pullman
