= Little Post Office =

Historic post office in Virginia, US

- U.S. National Register of Historic Places
- U.S. Historic district – Contributing property
- Virginia Landmarks Register
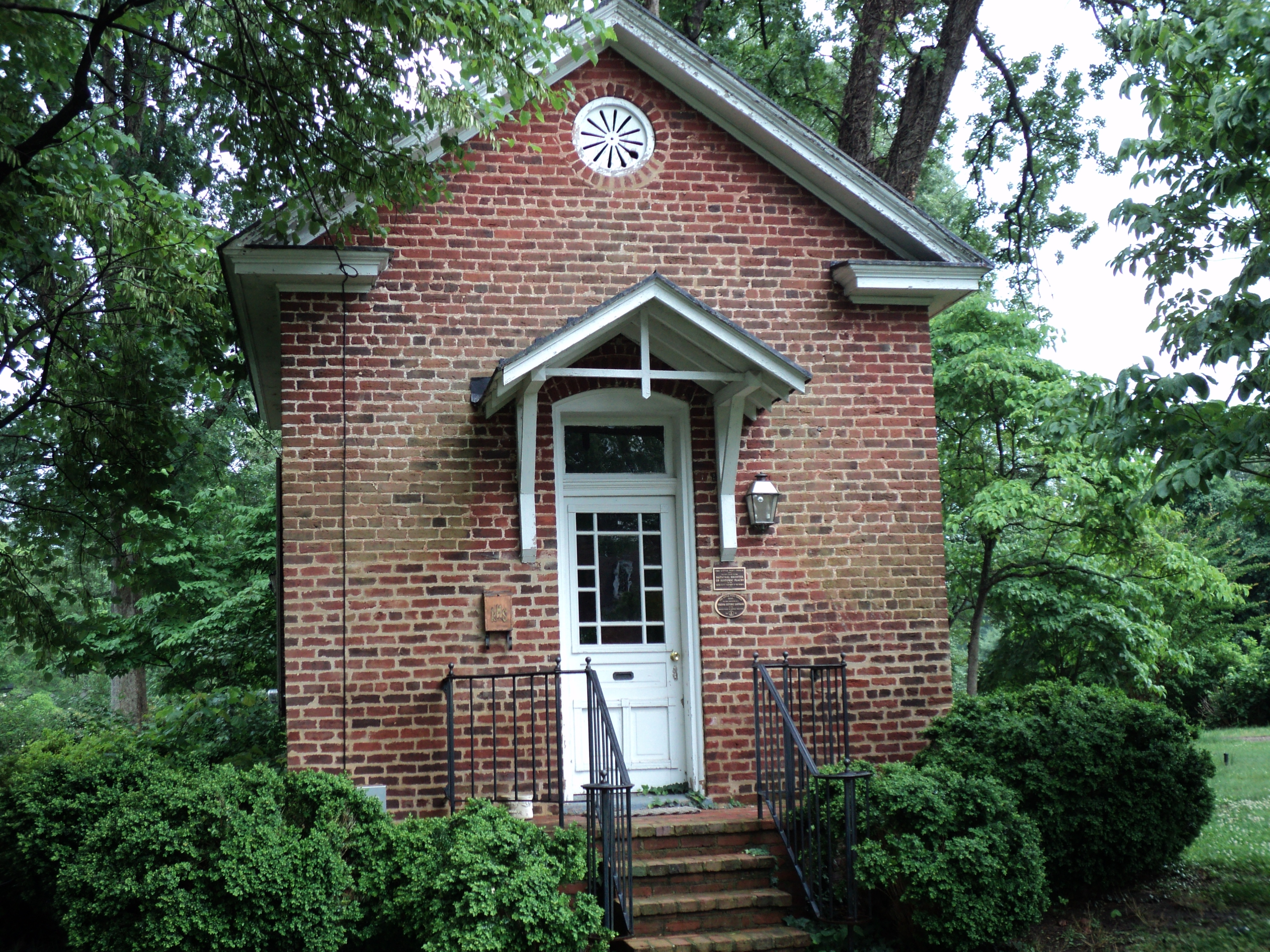
- The Little Post Office, May 2010

- Location within Virginia Location within the United States
- Location: 207 Starling Ave., Martinsville, Virginia
- Coordinates: 36°41′5″N 79°51′57″W
- Area: 2.4 acres (0.97 ha)
- Built: 1893
- Architectural style: Queen Anne
- NRHP reference No.: 97000150
- VLR No.: 120-0047

Significant dates
- Added to NRHP: February 21, 1997
- Designated VLR: December 4, 1996

Little Post Office is a historic post office building located at Martinsville, Virginia. It was built in 1893, and is a small one-story, gable front brick building with a frame rear extension. The exterior and one-room interior of the building are detailed in the Queen Anne style. It was used as a contract post office by star route mail delivery supervisor John B. Anglin from 1893 to 1917.

It was listed on the National Register of Historic Places in 1997. It is located in the East Church Street-Starling Avenue Historic District. It is now part of an art installation of the Piedmont Arts Association.
