= John Waddey Carter House =

Historic house in Virginia, United States

- U.S. National Register of Historic Places
- U.S. Historic district – Contributing property
- Virginia Landmarks Register
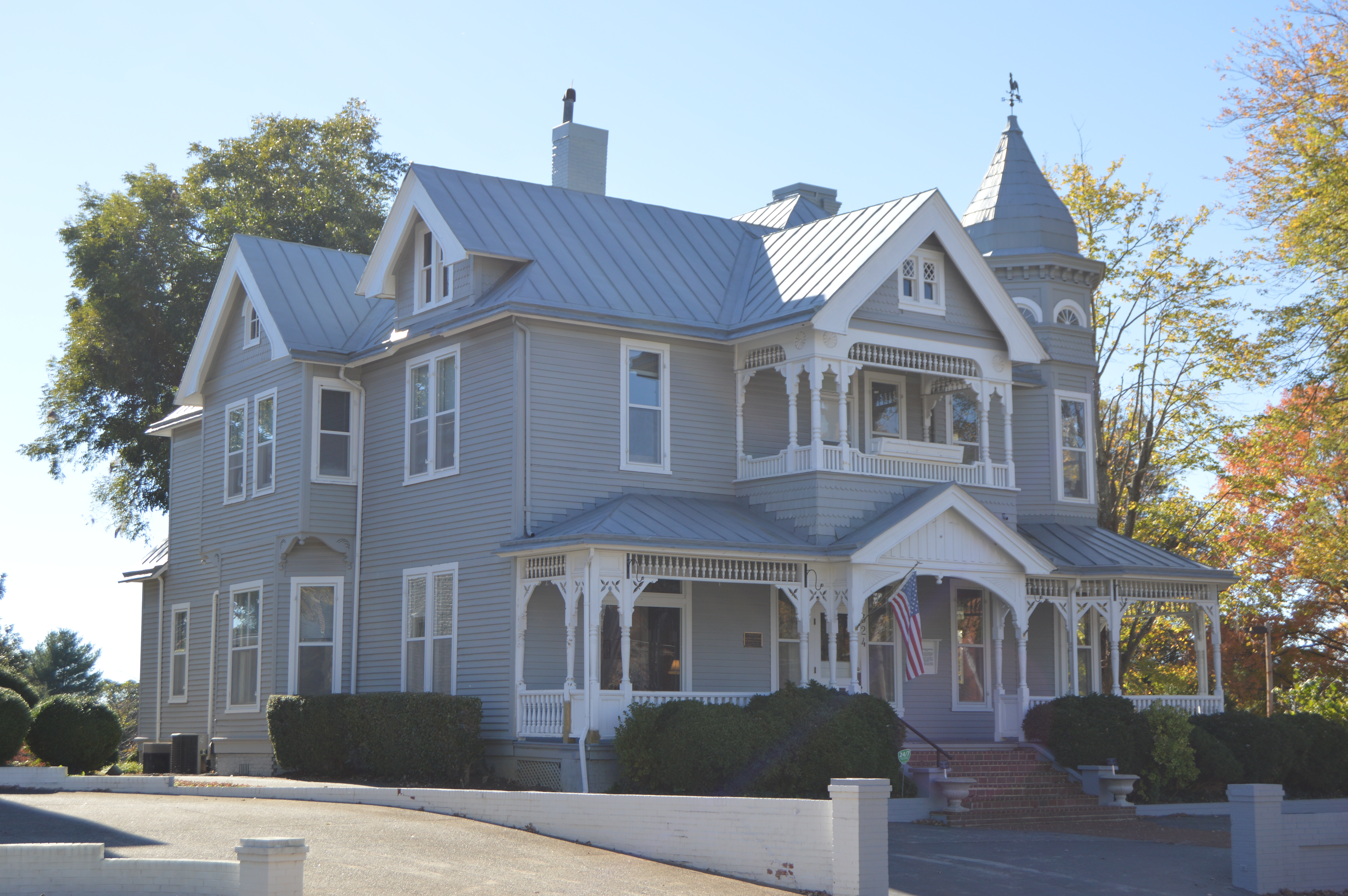
- Front and eastern side of the house

- Location within Virginia Location within the United States
- Location: 324 E. Church St., Martinsville, Virginia
- Coordinates: 36°41′18″N 79°51′55″W
- Area: Less than 1 acre (0.40 ha)
- Built: 1896
- Architectural style: Stick/eastlake, Queen Anne--Eastlake
- NRHP reference No.: 88002180
- VLR No.: 120-0035

Significant dates
- Added to NRHP: November 3, 1988
- Designated VLR: September 20, 1988

The John Waddey Carter House is a historic home located at Martinsville, Virginia. It was reportedly based on a design by architect George Franklin Barber and built in 1896. It is a two-story, irregularly massed, gray frame weatherboard sheathed Queen Anne style dwelling. It features a dominant two-story central gable, an asymmetrical one-story wrap-around porch, and a polygonal corner tower. It is topped by a standing-seam metal-clad hipped roof with steeply pitched lower cross gables. It also has a two-story bay window and service ell.

It was listed on the National Register of Historic Places in 1988. It is located in the East Church Street-Starling Avenue Historic District.
