= Masonic Hall, Sheringham =

Masonic Hall (The Assembly Rooms)
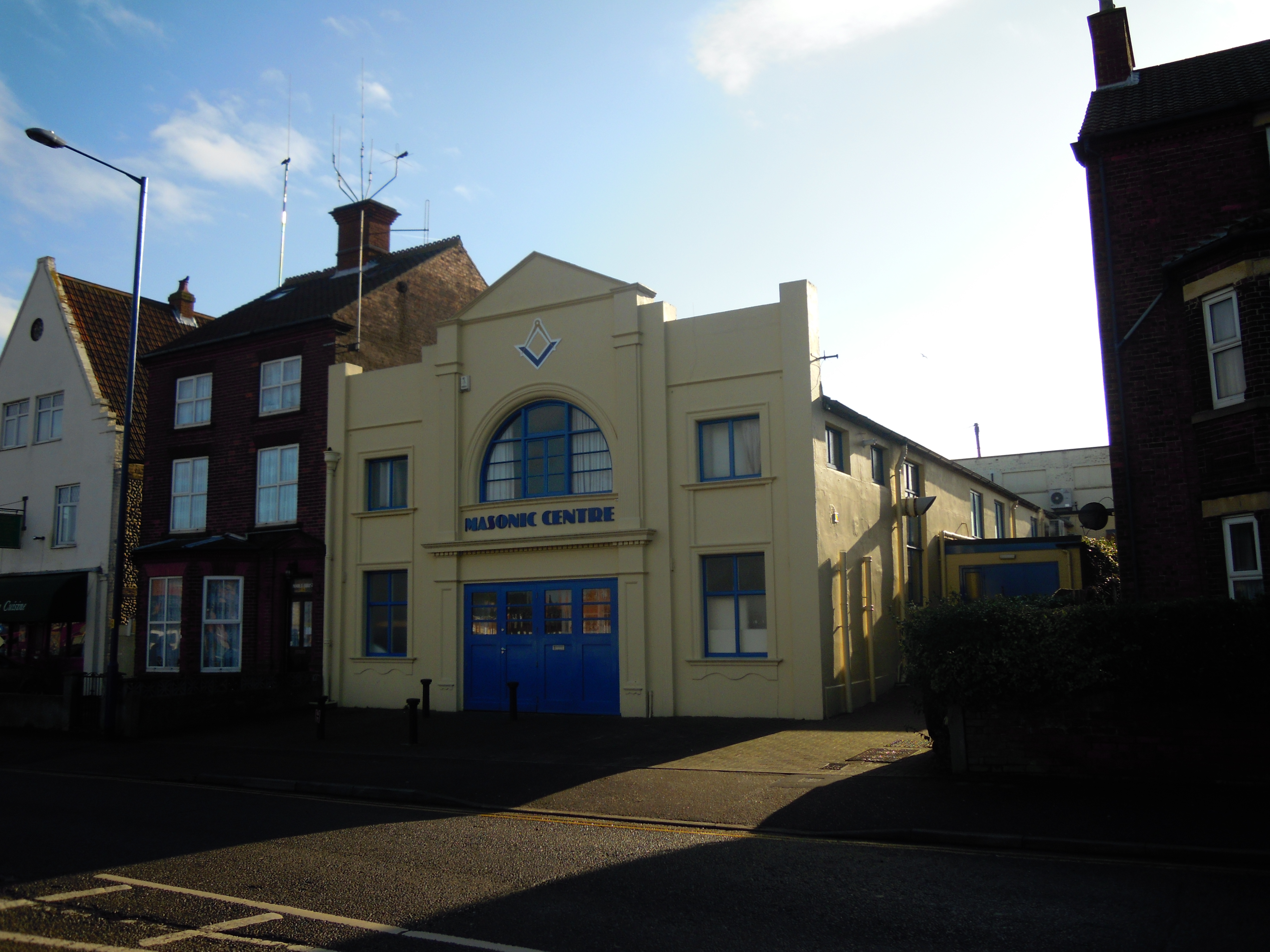

- Location within Norfolk

General information
- Type: Notable Building
- Location: 36 Cromer Road; Sheringham; NR26 8RR, England
- Coordinates: 52°56′26.22″N 1°12′31.19″E
- Opened: 1914
- Owner: Provincial Grand Lodge of Norfolk

The Masonic Hall, Sheringham was built in 1914 to house the Electric Picture Palace.

== Location ==
The hall is located on the landward side of the coast road, (Cromer Road), A 149.

== History ==
The building was built by C.A. Sadler who was a local Sheringham businessman and was conceived as a cinema. This cinema was built in the vernacular style of cinemas of that period. The cinema had seating for 400 people. The cinema was called the Electric Picture Palace and could only show silent movies as it was never wired for sound. By the late 1920s when the sound films began to take over, Sadler increasingly found that he had no silent films he could show. To alleviate this situation Sadler arrange to share reels with the cinema at near by Cromer. In later years the cinema was renamed the Casino Cinema and later still the Regal.

=== Closure ===
By 1931 the lack of investment in a sound system resulted in the final closure of the cinema. From that time on the building was employed for several uses, including as a roller skating rink. In 1960 the hall was used as a shoe factory by Edwards and Holmes Ltd, a Norwich-based shoe manufacturer.

=== New uses ===
In latter years following the closure of the shoe factory the hall became known as the Regal Assembly Rooms and was hired out for various occasions and functions. Eventually it was purchased by Provincial Grand Lodge of Norfolk for the local chapter of Freemasons and has been the Masonic Hall to this day.
