= Masonic Hall (Farmington, Washington) =

- U.S. National Register of Historic Places
- Location within Washington (state)
- Location: Corner of Main and Second Sts., Farmington, Washington
- Coordinates: 47°5′25″N 117°2′40″W
- Area: less than one acre
- Built: 1908
- Architect: Dr. John F. Grimm
- Architectural style: vernacular Neoclassical
- NRHP reference No.: 87000057
- Added to NRHP: February 12, 1987

The Masonic Hall in Farmington, Washington is a historic building constructed in 1908. It has also been known as Farmington Community Center. It was built as a meeting hall for a local Masonic Lodge and was donated to the town in 1985.

It was listed on the National Register of Historic Places in 1987 under the name Masonic Hall.
