= Masonic Hall (Wickenburg, Arizona) =

- U.S. National Register of Historic Places
- Location within Arizona Location within the United States
- Location: 108 Tegner, Wickenburg, Arizona
- Coordinates: 33°58′09″N 112°43′46″W
- Area: less than one acre
- Built: c. 1922
- Architectural style: Mission/Spanish Revival
- MPS: Wickenburg MRA
- NRHP reference No.: 86001583
- Added to NRHP: July 10, 1986

The Masonic Hall in Wickenburg, Arizona, United States, was built around 1922. It served historically as a clubhouse.

The building "is noteworthy as a rare local example of the concrete frame with brick infill method of construction."

The building was listed on the National Register of Historic Places in 1986. At that time it was the location of a Montgomery Ward department store.

Its Arizona State historic inventory noted that was a "rare local example of Mission Revival architecture" and that it was a demonstration of "unique local use of concrete frame construction."

By June 2011, the building was no longer standing. Building has been demolished by 2018.

Despite being lost, the building is apparently still listed on the National Register; no delisting is known to have occurred.
