= Masonic lodge officer =

Elected members of each Masonic Lodge

In Craft Freemasonry, sometimes known as Blue Lodge Freemasonry, every Masonic lodge elects or appoints Masonic lodge officers to execute the necessary functions of the lodge's life and work. The precise list of such offices may vary between the jurisdictions of different Grand Lodges, although certain factors are common to all, and others are usual in most.

All of the lodges in a given nation, state, or region are united under the authority of a Grand Lodge sovereign to its own jurisdiction. Most of the lodge offices listed below have equivalent offices in the Grand Lodge, but with the addition of the word "Grand" somewhere in the title. For example, every lodge has an officer called the "Junior Warden", whilst the Grand Lodge has a "Grand Junior Warden" (sometimes "Junior Grand Warden"). A very small number of offices may exist only at the Grand Lodge level – such offices are included at the end of this article.

There are few universal rules common to all Grand Lodge jurisdictions of Freemasonry (see Masonic Landmarks for accepted universal principles of regular Freemasonry). However, the structure of the progressive offices is very nearly universal. While the precise hierarchy or order of various officers within the "line" of officers may vary, the usual progression is for a lodge officer to spend either one or two years in each position, advancing through "the chairs", until he is elected as Worshipful Master. In addition, there are some offices that are traditionally not considered to be part of the "line", and which may be held by the same brother for many years, or may be reserved for Past Masters.

== Attribution of offices ==
The process of naming officers within Masonic lodges, rooted in centuries-old traditions, varies significantly across the globe. However, a common and widely practiced method is through merit-based selection and election, for some other Lodges, a progressive line is in use.

=== Merit-based selection ===
A Masonic lodge typically consists of a dedicated group of officers responsible for the smooth operation and governance of the lodge. The highest-ranking officer, often referred to as the "Worshipful Master", plays a central role in this structure. In lodges that follow the merit-based appointment system, officers express their preferences for specific positions they aspire to hold in the coming year. The Worshipful Master then reviews these choices and considers the merits of each candidate. The appointment decisions are based on factors such as the candidate's dedication, knowledge, experience, and past contributions to the lodge.

The officers of a Masonic lodge, aside from the Worshipful Master, can include a Senior Warden, Junior Warden, Treasurer, Secretary, Senior Deacon, Junior Deacon, and other positions, depending on the lodge's specific organizational structure. These officers work in collaboration to ensure the lodge's rituals and activities run smoothly.

==== Elected positions ====
In addition to appointed positions, Masonic lodges often feature elected positions where the brethren have the opportunity to choose their leaders through a democratic process. Any qualified brother who wishes to stand for an elected position, such as Senior Warden or Junior Warden, notifies the lodge's secretary of their intent. These positions are typically regarded as critical, as they play a pivotal role in the governance of the lodge and the execution of its rituals.

The election of officers is a crucial event in the Masonic calendar. On the designated election night, the names of the candidates are read aloud, and the members in attendance participate in a democratic vote. The criteria for evaluating candidates may include their contributions to the lodge, knowledge of Masonic principles, and their capacity to lead and support the brethren. The candidate who garners the most votes for a particular position is elected to that office.

==== Merit and democracy in Masonic officer appointments ====
The combination of merit-based appointments and democratic elections creates a system in which officers with proven dedication and capabilities are recognized and rewarded. This ensures that the lodge's leadership is both competent and representative of the brethren's wishes.

=== Progressive office ===
Progressive office refers to a series of offices within the lodge, culminating in the office of Worshipful Master. Ideally, a mason starts at the most junior office and "progresses" to the next in line each year. The exact composition of the progressive officers varies slightly by jurisdiction, but will typically finish with the series: Junior Deacon, Senior Deacon, Junior Warden, Senior Warden, Worshipful Master.

Not all Masonic Lodges adhere to the practice of a progressive line, and this tradition is primarily prevalent in the United States. It has faced criticism for its focus on advancing officers who may expect promotion, potentially undermining the significance of other crucial positions that do not fall within this progressive hierarchy.

== Offices common to all Masonic jurisdictions ==
=== Worshipful Master/ Venerable Master ===
Jewel of the Worshipful Master

The senior officer of a Masonic Lodge is the Master, normally addressed and referred to as the "Worshipful Master" (in Scotland, and in Lodges under the Scottish Constitution, the "Right Worshipful Master"). The Worshipful Master sits in the East of the lodge room, chairs all of the business of his lodge, and is vested with considerable powers without further reference to the members. He also presides over ritual and ceremonies.

The office of Worshipful Master is the highest honour to which a lodge may appoint any of its members. The office is filled annually by election, often by secret ballot. The requirements as to who is eligible for election as Master vary from jurisdiction to jurisdiction, but the majority of jurisdictions specify that a brother must have served as an installed Warden to qualify. In practice, most lodges will nominate and elect the previous year's Senior Warden in an uncontested election.

Jewel of a Past Master

At the conclusion of his limited term of office, a Worshipful Master is termed a Past Master. The duties and privileges of Past Masters vary from lodge to lodge and jurisdiction to jurisdiction. For example, in some jurisdictions Past Masters become life members of the Grand Lodge, while in others they are not. In most jurisdictions, a Past Master retains the honorific "Worshipful" (as in "Worshipful Brother Smith"), however there are a few where this honorific is used exclusively for sitting Masters.

The corresponding grand rank is Grand Master. The Grand Master may preside over his Grand Lodge, and also has certain powers and rights in every lodge under his jurisdiction. Grand Masters are usually addressed as "Most Worshipful", or as in Pennsylvania, "Right Worshipful".

=== Senior Warden ===
Jewel of the Senior Warden

The Senior Warden (sometimes known as First Warden) is the second of the three principal officers of a lodge and is the Master's principal deputy. Under some constitutions, if the Worshipful Master is absent, then the Senior Warden presides at meetings as "acting Master" and may act for the Master in all matters of lodge business. Under other constitutions, only sitting Masters or Past Masters may preside as "acting Master," and so the Senior Warden cannot fulfill this role unless he is also a Past Master. In many lodges it is presumed that the Senior Warden will become the next Worshipful Master. In some jurisdictions, the position is an elected office, while in others it is appointed by the Master.

=== Junior Warden ===
Jewel of the Junior Warden

The third of the principal officers is the Junior Warden (or Second Warden). The Junior Warden is charged with the supervision of the Lodge while it is "at refreshment" (in recess for meals or other social purposes). In some jurisdictions the Junior Warden has a particular responsibility for ensuring that visiting Masons are in possession of the necessary credentials. In others, this is the job of the Tyler. In some jurisdictions the Junior Warden presides if both the Master and the Senior Warden are absent. In some jurisdictions, the position is an elected office, while in others it is appointed by the Master.

The Wardens are "regular officers" of the Lodge, meaning that the positions must be filled.

=== Treasurer ===
Jewel of the Treasurer

The role of the Treasurer is to keep the accounts, collect annual dues from the members, pay bills, and forward annual dues to the Grand Lodge.

The annual presentation of accounts is an important measure of the lodge's continuing viability, whilst the efficient collection of annual subscriptions is vitally important, as any lapse in payment (deliberate or unintentional) can lead to a member losing voting rights, being denied the opportunity to visit other lodges, and finally even being debarred or excluded from his own lodge. In some jurisdictions, the position is an elected office, while in others it is appointed by the Master.

It is common for the Treasurer to be an experienced Past Master, but this is not required.

=== Secretary ===
Secretary

Assistant Secretary

Jewels of Masonic Secretary

The Secretary's official duties include issuing the summons (a formal notice of an impending meeting, with time, date and agenda), recording meeting minutes, completing statistical returns to the Grand Lodge, and advising the Worshipful Master on matters of procedure. Many individual lodge bylaws add to these duties by mandating, for example, that the Secretary serve on specific committees. Although any member may hold the office of Secretary, it is typically held by an experienced Past Master. It is not unusual for the office of Secretary to be held by the same member for long periods of time, even decades. In some jurisdictions, the position is an elected office, while in others it is appointed by the Master.

Some jurisdictions allow lodges to combine the duties of the Secretary and Treasurer into a single office the 'Secretary/Treasurer'. Allowing the lodge to continue to operate with a smaller number of officers. The Secretary/Treasurer must perform the duties listed above for both offices. The Secretary/Treasurer typically wears the jewel for the Secretary.

=== Stewards ===
Jewel of the Stewards

Stewards fulfill a number of junior assistant roles. There is considerable variance, even within the same jurisdiction, as to the precise roles played by Stewards. Some of their common duties could include the following:

- Stewards are often tasked with an understudy role to fill the position of the Senior Deacon or Junior Deacon, in their absence.
- When a degree ceremony is performed, one or more Steward(s) may be required to assist the two Deacons in conducting the candidates around the temple.
- Stewards have a traditional role in many jurisdictions of serving wine at any meal after the lodge meeting, often extended to a general supervision and planning of catering and refreshments.

Some jurisdictions specify that each lodge has two Stewards, known as the 'Senior Steward' and 'Junior Steward'. In others, the Worshipful Master may appoint any number of Stewards, according to the size and requirements of his lodge, and in this respect the office is unique.

Although newer members usually fill the office of Steward, in some lodges it is traditional for a Past Master to be appointed to supervise the stewards' work. The office may serve to dignify a useful member of the Lodge, such as a webmaster or wine buyer, or to establish precedence in the rotation of officers.

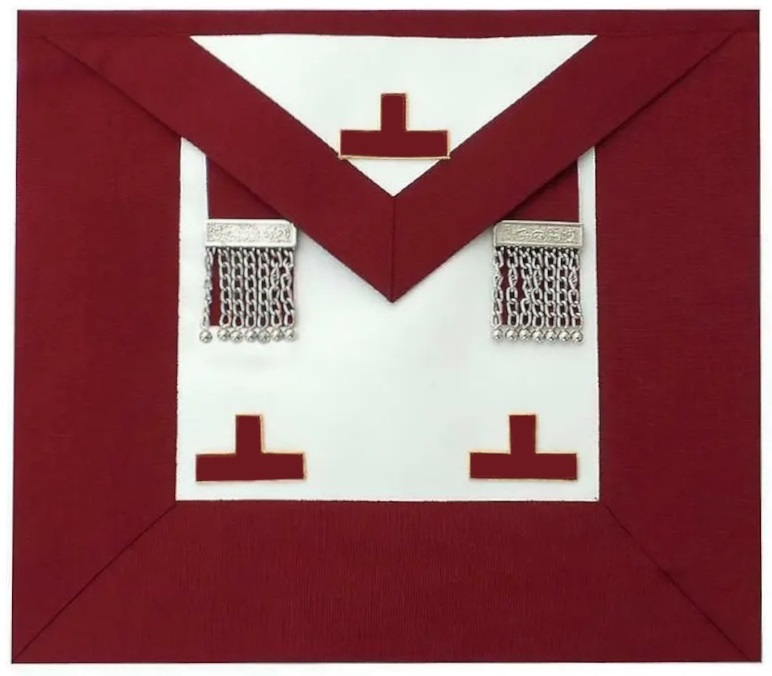
The distinctive red apron of a brother Past Master as Grand Steward of the United Grand Lodge of England

Grand Stewards are typically promising junior members at Grand Lodge level, who may subsequently expect accelerated promotion as Grand Officers. In the United Grand Lodge of England (UGLE), the Grand Stewards rank as Grand Officers during their year of office. All who hold or have held the office of Grand Steward may become members of the Grand Stewards' Lodge. Nineteen lodges hold the right to nominate an UGLE Grand Steward each year, and as all Grand Stewards wear distinctive red aprons, these lodges are known as 'red apron lodges'. Typically these lodges nominate their current Worshipful Master and can, therefore, be relatively junior through to extremely senior members. The importance of the right to nominate UGLE Grand Stewards as well as their duties go back to the first formation of the Premier Grand Lodge, when the Office carried onerous financial liabilities. Grand Stewards of United Grand Lodge of England are still expected to organise and subsidise the Grand Festival, which is held each year directly after the Annual Investiture. In addition to the Grand Stewards at UGLE level as described above, there are also Grand Stewards at Provincial and District Grand Lodge level.

== Officers found in some jurisdictions and not in others ==
There are many officers that are found in some jurisdictions and not in others. Depending on the jurisdiction, some are "progressive" others are not. The more common ones include:

=== Deacons ===
Senior Deacon

Junior Deacon

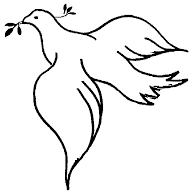
Jewel for both Senior and Junior Deacons (some jurisdictions)

Jewels of Masonic Deacons

A Deacon is a junior officer in the lodge. In most jurisdictions, a lodge has two Deacons, styled Senior Deacon and Junior Deacon (though First Deacon and Second Deacon are sometimes encountered as an alternative).

The principal duties of the Senior Deacon are to conduct candidates around the Lodge and speak for them during certain ceremonies, to attend the Worshipful Master as needed and to carry his orders to the Senior Warden.

The office and duties of Junior Deacon are similar in many respects to that of Senior Deacon, to attend the Senior Warden, and carry messages to the Junior Warden. In some jurisdictions he is also responsible for guarding the inside of the main door of the lodge and ensuring that the lodge is "tyled" (in other jurisdictions this duty is given to the "Inner Guard" or "Inside Sentinel" or Pursuivant).

In some systems of Continental Freemasonry, the Deacons are entirely absent, although not always, such as in the British Federation of Le Droit Humain, where it fulfils the role of the Grand Expert, a Continental officer. Continental lodges without Deacons share the functions between the Inner Guard and the Wardens.

The jewel of the deacons in some jurisdictions is denoted by a Dove or by Mercury, the winged messenger, indicating their duty in the Lodge.

=== Tyler ===
Jewel of the Tyler

The 'Tyler' (sometimes spelled 'Tiler') is sometimes known as the 'Outer Guard' of the lodge. His duty is to guard the door (from the outside), with a drawn sword, and ensure that only those who are duly qualified manage to gain entry into the lodge meeting. In some jurisdictions, he also prepares candidates for their admission. The Tyler is traditionally responsible for preparing the lodge room before the meeting, and for storing and maintaining the regalia after the meeting.

In some jurisdictions the Tyler is a Past Master of the Lodge while in others he may be an employed brother from another lodge.

=== Inner Guard or Inside Sentinel ===
The office of 'Inner Guard' (or Inside Sentinel) is mandatory in UK lodges, but rare in American lodges. The Inner Guard is also an office in Australian and New Zealand lodges. This position is commonly assigned to a fairly junior member, as it provides a good opportunity for him to meet members and observe and learn ceremonies, and is at the beginning of the progressive offices leading to the Chair.

The task of guarding the door is shared with the 'Tyler' (see above). The Inner Guard is on the inside of the door, and in some jurisdictions is armed with a poignard, or short dagger. In those jurisdictions which do not appoint an Inner Guard (and even in some that do), this duty is given to the Junior Deacon (see above).

=== Chaplain ===
Jewel of the Chaplain

In most Masonic jurisdictions, each lodge will have a 'Chaplain'. The principal duty of the Chaplain is to lead prayer before and after the lodge meeting, and to say grace while the lodge is at dinner. In many lodges this position is filled by a clergyman (an ordained minister, priest, rabbi, imam, etc.) who is a brother of the lodge. However, it is not required that the Chaplain be a clergyman, as prayers are non-denominational. In some lodges the tradition is for the immediate Past Master to act as Chaplain.

=== Director of Ceremonies / Ritualist / Ritual Director / Master of Ceremonies ===
The title 'Director of Ceremonies' is used in the United Grand Lodge of England and its subordinate lodges, as well as in many other jurisdictions. However, other titles found in other jurisdictions include 'Lecturer' and 'Ritualist'. Some Continental ritual uses 'Master of Ceremonies' and has the Deacon perform the duties linked to this title in other jurisdictions. This Continental Master of Ceremonies' primary duty is to lead people around the lodge.

Whatever the title, this officer is responsible for the smooth flowing of ceremonial and ritual and may hold rehearsals. He may be responsible for prompting other officers who forget their lines. In some jurisdictions, he directs proceedings during the installation of a new Worshipful Master. He is also responsible for forming processions and introducing visitors, except in those jurisdictions which appoint a 'Marshal' for these latter purposes (see below).

The Grand Lodge of New York has developed the position of Lodge Ritual Director to facilitate this role and to ensure the smooth flowing of ceremonial and ritual and may hold rehearsals. He may be responsible for prompting other officers who forget their lines.

=== Marshal ===
Jewel of the Marshall

The office of 'Marshal' is quite common in the United States, but not in other countries. In some jurisdictions where it is found, the title is simply an alternative for 'Director of Ceremonies' (see above).

However, there are jurisdictions in which the office is distinct from any other, in which cases the duties of the office revolve around the organisation of processions and ensuring the correct precedence and etiquette in formal proceedings, including the introduction of visitors to the lodge. This is distinct (in such jurisdictions) from the role of the Director of Ceremonies in supervising the ritual of the lodge's degree ceremonies.

In many jurisdictions of the United States, the Marshal is also in charge of performing the flag ceremonies, including the posting of the flag, leading the Pledge of Allegiance, and retiring the flag. In the case of lodges that use the flags of other countries, in addition of the US flag for special meetings or events, the Marshal is responsible for designating another brother to perform the appropriate similar ceremony for that flag, as the US flag.

=== Master of Banquets ===
The Master of Banquet is a role within some Masonic lodges responsible for organizing and overseeing Lodge meals under the supervision of the Junior Warden. This position involves coordinating the preparation of food and supplies for Lodge gatherings, working with apprentices and overseeing financial matters related to the meals. The Master of Banquet also plays a symbolic role, with their attire featuring Masonic symbols like a compass and pomegranates, representing precision, abundance, and fraternity. This position reports to the Junior Warden and supervises Senior and Junior Stewards, as well as instructs Entered Apprentices in setting-up Table Lodges and traditions.

=== Masters of Ceremony ===
Jewel of the Master of Ceremonies

The offices of 'Senior and Junior Masters of Ceremony' appear in some jurisdictions. Their primary duty is to prepare the candidates prior to each of the three degrees and conduct the candidates during the degree conferrals. They also maintain order during special circumstances at the discretion of the Worshipful Master. In some jurisdictions, the Masters of Ceremony are responsible for answering alarms at the preparing room, examination room or outer doors.

This title is sometimes used in Continental ritual, but to describe the Director of Ceremonies role. Here the Deacon performs the above Master of Ceremony duties.

=== Almoner/ Eleemosynary/ Hospitaller ===
The Almoner also called the Caring Officer, Eleemosynary or Hospitaller is responsible for the well-being of lodge members and their families. He remains in contact with members who are unwell, and also maintains a discreet presence in the lives of widows of former members, so that the lodge may readily assist them should they find themselves in any particular need.

Of necessity, the Almoner must be well versed in local and national Masonic charities and the scope of their charitable work, so as to offer advice to those who might qualify for such assistance.

In some jurisdictions, these duties are handled by a committee (under various titles).

=== Organist / Director of Music / Master of Harmony ===
Jewel of the Organist

The 'Organist', 'Director of Music' sometimes Master of Harmony provides musical accompaniment to lodge proceedings, although there is no set form. Many lodge rooms are equipped with a pipe organ or electronic organ, and in others, there is provision for a wider range of instruments. In other places, the Director of Music operates recorded or digital music systems, such as at the Grand Lodge of Austria in Vienna.

=== Orator ===
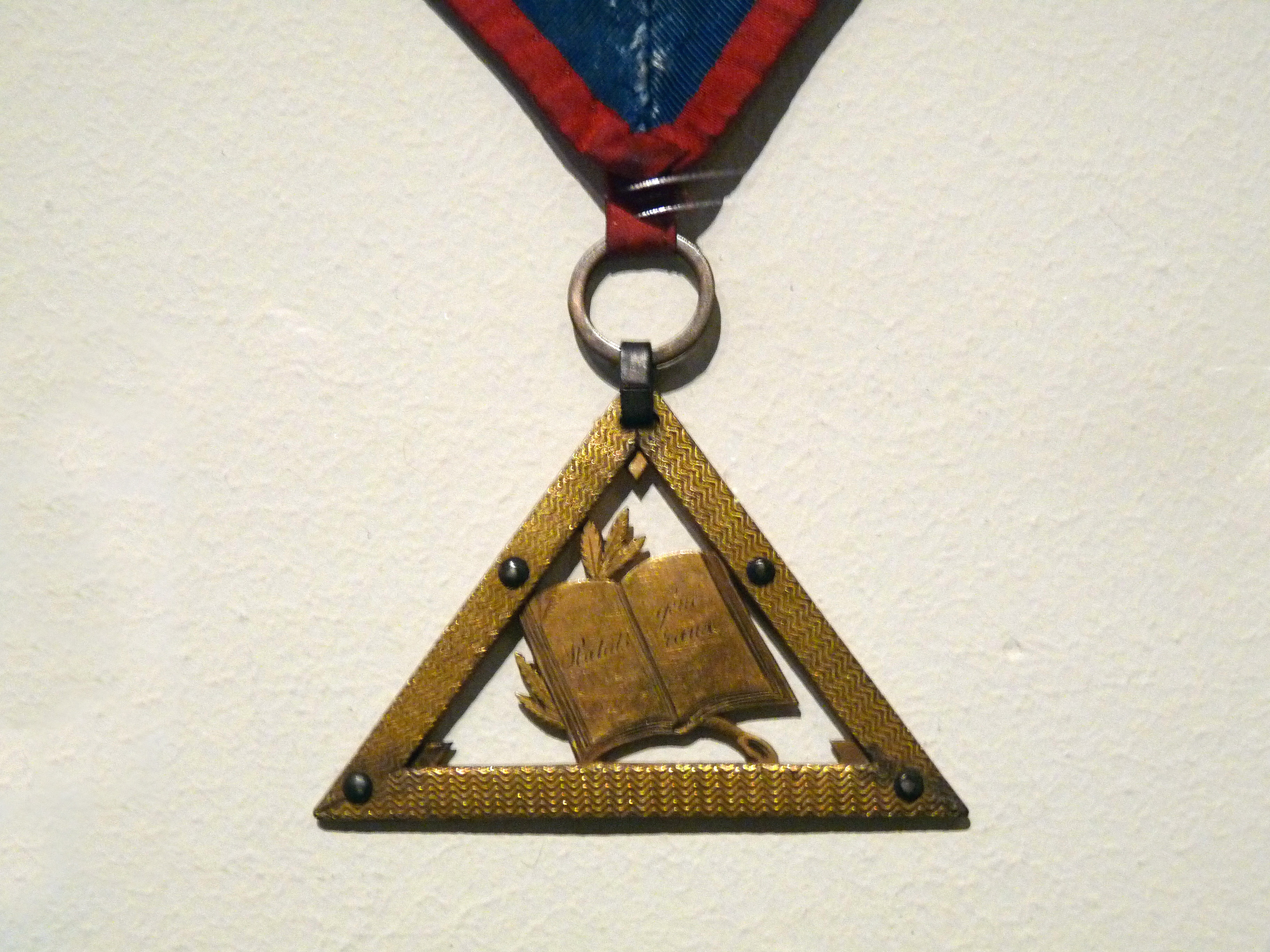
Jewel of the Orator

The Orator in a Masonic Lodge is a highly respected role often given to a Past Master or an experienced brother. They serve as the guardian of Masonic law and traditions and play a pivotal role in upholding Lodge values and unity. Key duties include preparing and delivering speeches for various Lodge events, welcoming new members, conducting research, and ensuring harmony during Lodge discussions and debates. The Orator is also responsible for maintaining order, mentoring fellow brothers, and embodying wisdom and integrity within the Lodge. This position is typically reserved for Past Masters due to their experience and wisdom.

In some jurisdictions there is a strong tradition of Masonic research and education, and the presentation of papers by members is as common as degree ceremonies or other business. In such cases, the 'Orator' may present papers, or be responsible for their presentation by others. The Orator may also be called upon to present a paper to celebrate milestones in the life of the lodge.

In addition, in some European jurisdictions (e.g. Germany, Austria, France) the Orator ('Redner', i.e. speaker) is a kind of legal advisor, he is responsible for upholding the Constitution and By-Laws and prosecutor in masonic disciplinary proceedings. His ranking is right behind the Worshipful Master and his deputy. His jewel is the statute book.

This kind of office is originating in the 'Parlierer' of medieval operative stonemasons. They did elect the 'Parlierer' from among the senior fellows as their representative whereas the Master was appointed by the building owner. The ‘Parlierer’ acted as a deputy to the Master.

The term Grand Orator refers to a similar office within Grand Lodges.

=== Superintendent of Works ===
The Superintendent of Works keeps the inventory, and is responsible for the material possessions of the lodge. It is his responsibility to see that the lodge is properly set out before the ceremony, and that everything is safely locked away at the end of the evening.

=== Immediate Past Master ===
While the Immediate Past Master (the last brother to hold the office of Worshipful Master, in some areas titled the "Junior Past Master") is not formally an officer of the lodge, in certain jurisdictions he has his own duties. In the United Grand Lodge of England, he has a ceremonial role in the opening and closing of the lodge, and is expected to deputise for the Worshipful Master in the event of his absence or death.

== Additional (less common) offices ==
There are certain offices which exist only in particular lodges, or only in the lodges of one particular jurisdiction. As far as possible, the following list seeks to record all such offices that are either reasonably widespread, or else have been made notable by some other means, such as being held by famous people.

=== Historian / Librarian ===
Jewel of the Historian

Most lodges have a senior member who holds a particular interest in the lodge's history. In some jurisdictions, this interest may lead to appointment to formal office as the lodge's 'Historian'. The office involves the archiving of documents and artifacts, and the publishing and updating of historical information. In some jurisdictions, a 'Librarian' procures Masonic reading material for Members of the Lodge and maintains a small Library where books and magazines may be borrowed.

=== Charity Steward ===
All lodges are charged with maintaining an appropriate level of charitable giving to good causes. In some jurisdictions, the office of 'Charity Steward' exists. He is responsible for encouraging the members to give generously, as well as leading discussions about the appropriate recipients of the lodge's charitable donations.

=== Poet Laureate ===
This rare office was first created by the 'Lodge Canongate Kilwinning' No 2 in Edinburgh. In 1787 the lodge appointed Robert Burns as 'Poet Laureate', an investiture later immortalised in a painting by Stewart Watson, the original of which hangs in the Grand Lodge of Scotland building in Edinburgh. The painting incorporates a certain amount of artistic license, which may possibly extend to the presence of Burns himself, for although he was certainly a member of the Lodge, it is not clear that he was present at the meeting at which he was appointed Poet Laureate. In 1843, David Wardlaw Scott is recorded as the Poet Laureate of the St. David's Lodge of Edinburgh. In 1884, Rob Morris was crowned 'the poet Laureate of Freemasonry' in New York. In 1905, the office of Poet Laureate in the Canongate Kilwinning No 2 lodge was awarded to Rudyard Kipling, who was made an honorary member for that purpose.

=== Pursuivant ===
While more commonly seen at the Grand Lodge level, in some jurisdictions Lodges may also appoint a Pursuivant. He is often responsible for answering alarms at the outer door of the Lodge, in place of another officer.

== Offices generally found only at Grand Lodge level ==
The offices in a Grand Lodge are generally derived from the corresponding offices in its subordinate lodges. However, there are certain offices that must necessarily be filled in Grand Lodges, but have no private lodge equivalent. These are outlined below.

=== Deputy Grand Master ===
In some jurisdictions, a Deputy Grand Master serves as the Grand Master's assistant, and is given the authority to act in the Grand Master's name in his absence.

In England, under the jurisdiction of the United Grand Lodge of England, should the Grand Master be a member of the Royal family, a Pro Grand Master is appointed to officiate as Grand Master in his absence on Royal duties.

=== Grand Education Officer or Grand Lecturer ===
In some jurisdictions the Grand Master will appoint a Grand Educator or Grand Lecturer, whose responsibility is to oversee the promotion of Masonic Education in the Jurisdiction. He develops programs, produces materials, and offers resources that enhance and elevate Masonic Knowledge for the brethren. He oversees the activities of the Education and Services Committee, and with the approval of the Grand Master, appoints District level officers to assist him in his duties.

=== Grand Chancellor ===
The Grand Chancellor is responsible for external relations and formal interaction with the Grand Lodges of other jurisdictions. Only a few jurisdictions have Grand Chancellors. In most jurisdictions, the Grand Secretary fulfills these duties. The United Grand Lodge of England changed its constitution in 2007 to allow for the appointment of a Grand Chancellor for the first time. The UGLE Grand Chancellor ranks in precedence immediately after the UGLE Grand Secretary.

In England, Lodge of Antiquity No. 2 and Royal Somerset House and Inverness Lodge No. IV are rare examples of lodges that appoint a Chancellor as one of their officers. In Antiquity No. 2 it tends to be the senior active member of the lodge. In Royal Somerset House and Inverness Lodge No. IV it appears that when the office was created in the nineteenth century it was intended to be similar to the role of Chaplain. However, when revived in the early twentieth century, the role was more directed towards external relations. By the late twentieth century it appears that it had become customary for the office to be awarded to the longest-serving member of the Lodge.

=== Grand Registrar ===
In some jurisdictions a 'Grand Registrar' is appointed to be the principal legal officer of a Grand Lodge. The role is generally held by a qualified lawyer or judge. In other jurisdictions, there is no official title given to the holders of these duties.

=== Grand Superintendent of Works ===
When this office exists, the 'Grand Superintendent of Works' is a Grand Lodge officer responsible for the Grand Lodge building, and as such, the office is usually awarded to a qualified architect or builder. Responsibility for individual Lodge buildings usually falls to a committee.

=== Grand Sword Bearer ===
Many Grand Masters are preceded in formal processions by a ceremonial sword. In such cases a "Grand Sword Bearer" is appointed to carry the sword.

=== Grand Standard Bearer or Grand Banner Bearer ===
Many Grand Masters or Grand Lodges have an official standard which is carried behind the Grand Master in formal processions. In such cases a "Grand Standard Bearer" or "Grand Banner Bearer" is appointed.

=== Grand Pursuivant ===
It is the Grand Pursuivant's duty to announce all applicants for admission into the Grand Lodge by their names and Masonic titles; to take charge of the jewels and regalia of the Grand Lodge; to attend all communications of the Grand Lodge, and to perform such other duties as may be required by the Grand Master or presiding officer.

== Order of precedence and honorary appointments ==
Under the jurisdiction of the United Grand Lodge of England, the order of precedence of masonic offices and their incumbents at Provincial and District Grand Lodge level is:

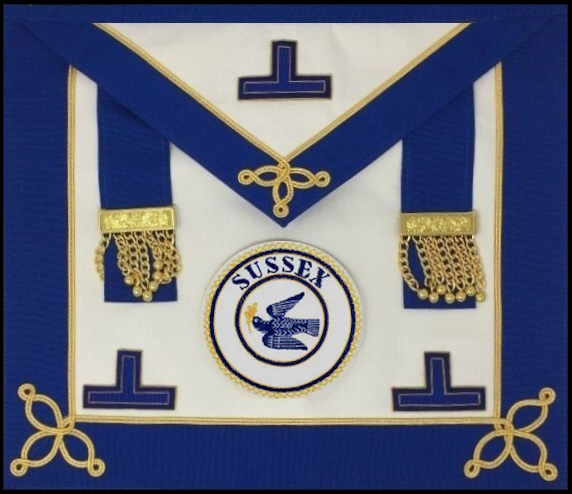
'Undress' apron of a brother Past Master (indicated by the three 'levels') holding Provincial Grand Rank (indicated by the dark blue border) as Senior Grand Deacon of the Provincial Grand Lodge of Sussex (indicated by the central badge)

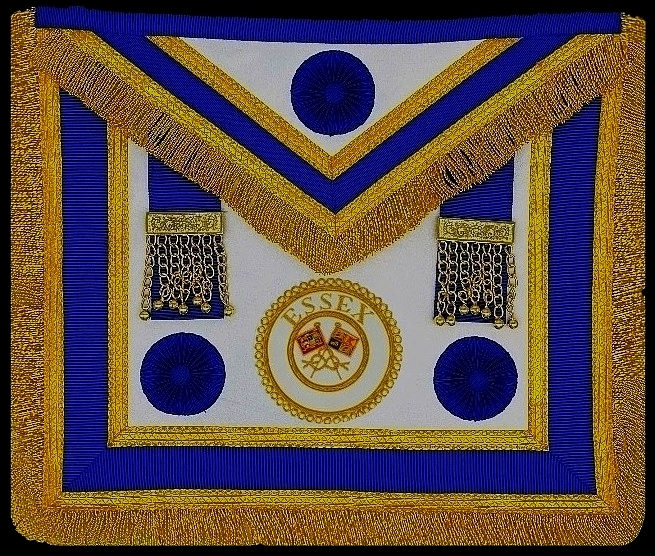
'Full dress' apron of a brother Master Mason (indicated by the three 'rosettes') holding Provincial Grand Rank as Grand Standard Bearer of the Provincial Grand Lodge of Essex (indicated by the central badge)

1. Provincial Grand Master
2. Deputy Grand Master
3. Assistant Grand Master
4. Senior Grand Warden *
5. Junior Grand Warden *
6. Grand Chaplain
7. Grand Treasurer *
8. Grand Registrar
9. Grand Secretary
10. Grand Director of Ceremonies
11. Grand Sword Bearer
12. Grand Superintendent of Works
13. Deputy Grand Chaplain
14. Deputy Grand Registrar
15. Deputy Grand Secretary
16. Deputy Grand Director of Ceremonies
17. Deputy Grand Sword Bearer
18. Deputy Grand Superintendent of Works
19. Grand Almoner *
20. Grand Charity Steward *
21. Grand Mentor *
22. Grand Orator *
23. Senior Grand Deacon *
24. Junior Grand Deacon *
25. Assistant Grand Chaplain
26. Assistant Grand Registrar
27. Assistant Grand Secretary
28. Assistant Grand Director of Ceremonies
29. Assistant Grand Sword Bearer
30. Assistant Grand Superintendent of Works
31. Grand Organist
32. Grand Standard Bearer
33. Assistant Grand Standard Bearer
34. Deputy Grand Organist
35. Grand Pursuivant
36. Assistant Grand Pursuivant
37. Grand Steward *
38. Grand Tyler *

Offices which are here marked with an asterisk (*) do not normally have further positions (e.g. as 'Deputy' or 'Assistant') associated with them, although this may vary from masonic province to masonic province.

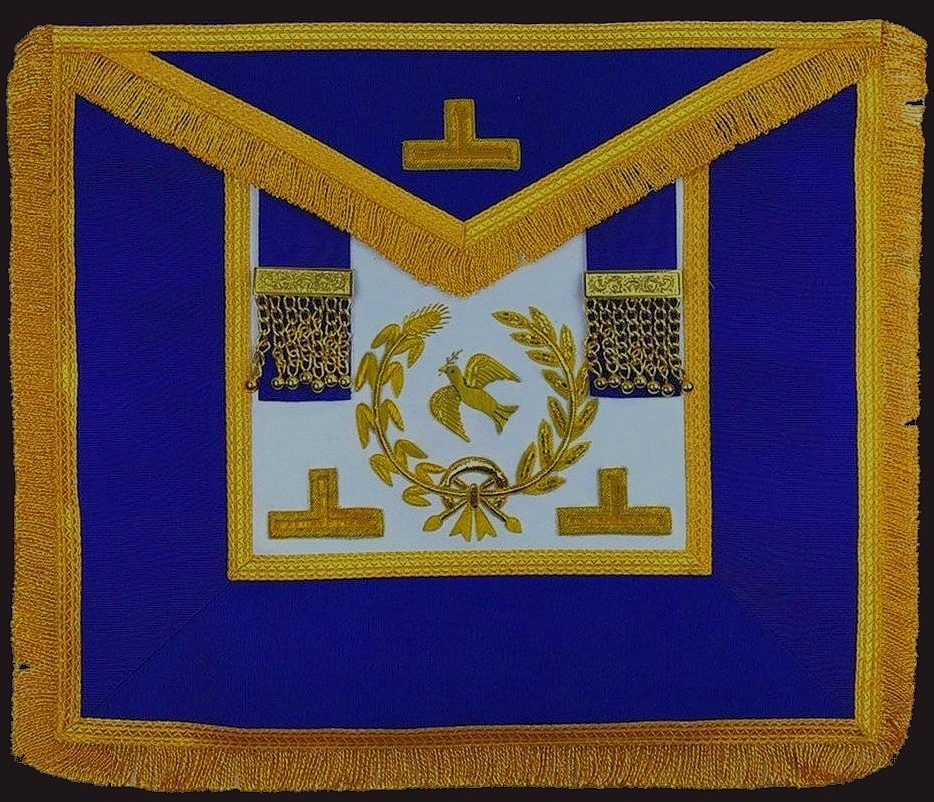
'Full dress' apron of a brother Past Master holding UGLE Grand Rank (indicated by the broad dark blue border and the dark blue apron flap) as Senior Grand Deacon (indicated by the central badge)

Brethren who execute administrative and/or ceremonial functions in a Provincial Grand Lodge are called 'acting rank' provincial grand officers. Past 'acting rank' provincial grand officers may be considered for promotion to either a higher provincial office ('acting' or 'past') or, in due time, even at UGLE (Grand Lodge) level. Holders of UGLE Grand Rank are distinguished from provincial grand officers by wearing aprons that are of a larger size and of slightly different design. UGLE Grand Rank always takes precedence over provincial rank, but does not supersede it.

In addition, Provincial and District Grand Lodges in England and Wales usually maintain a practice of honouring certain Past Masters of Craft Lodges as well as other distinguished Brethren by granting them the rank and precedence of a 'past' provincial grand officer, even if they have never actively held such a position in Provincial Grand Lodge. A Brother who has served as Worshipful Master and made valuable contributions to his Craft Lodge but never occupied a role in Provincial Grand Lodge may thus find himself appointed Past Provincial [name of masonic office], e.g. Past Provincial Assistant Grand Pursuivant.

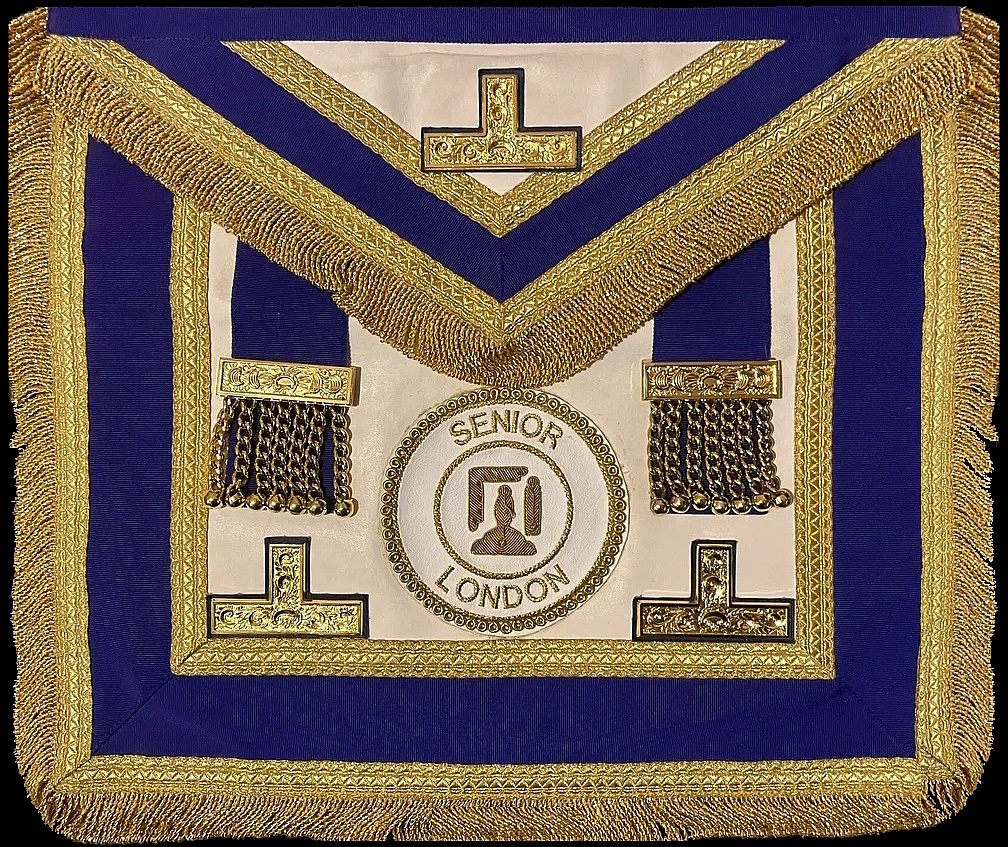
'Full dress' apron of a brother Past Master holding Senior London Grand Rank (indicated by the central badge)

An entirely different system of Masonic honours is operated by the Metropolitan Grand Lodge of London. Instead of granting Brethren the honorary title and precedence of an actual office at Grand Lodge level, the Metropolitan Grand Lodge of London uses a two-tier system without further differentiation, whereby Brethren may be awarded London Grand Rank and Senior London Grand Rank, respectively.

== See also ==
- Swedish Rite has somewhat different offices.
