= Interior Grain Tramway =

- U.S. National Register of Historic Places
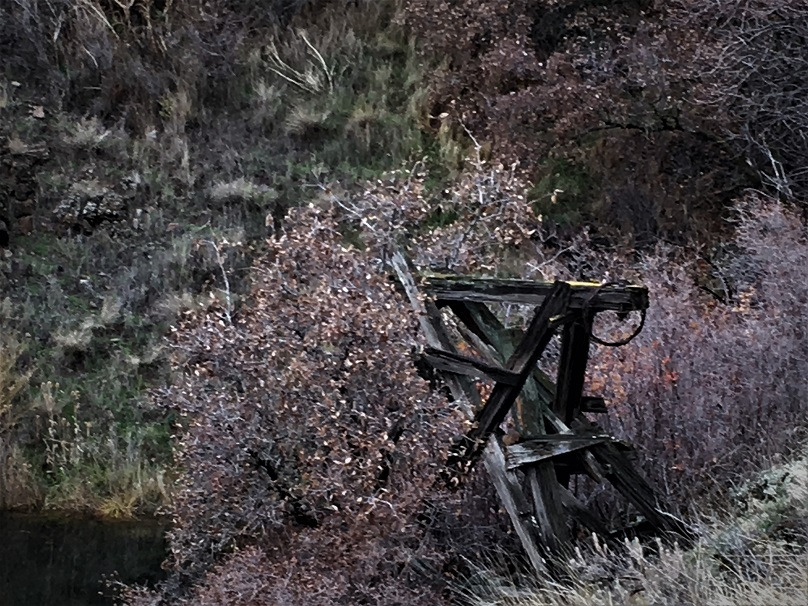
- One of the few remaining towers

- Location within Washington (state) Location within the United States
- Nearest city: Pullman, Washington
- Coordinates: 46°39′43″N 117°22′38″W
- Area: 8 acres (3.2 ha)
- Architect: Kuhn, Aaron; Manning, Seymour
- Architectural style: Tramway
- MPS: Grain Production Properties in Eastern Washington MPS
- NRHP reference No.: 88001538
- Added to NRHP: September 22, 1988

The Interior Grain Tramway was an aerial tramway built in 1901 near Pullman, Washington to move grain in sacks from the Palouse hills to the Snake River over a horizontal distance of 1,200 metres (3,900 ft) and a vertical fall of 700 metres (2,300 ft). Grain was stored in warehouses at the top and bottom of the tramway for shipment on riverboats to a railroad terminal at Riparia, Washington, 40 miles (64 km) away, with a capacity of up to 250,000 bushels per year. The tramway operated until 1938, when competition from rail service made it obsolescent. Eight of the tramways towers remain standing, and at least 27 have collapsed.

== History ==
The Interior Tramway was conceived and financed by Colfax, Washington resident Aaron Kuhn. It is one of several such tramways operated on the Columbia Plateau in the early 20th century. Kuhn, born in Germany in 1857, had emigrated to the United States in 1873, moving around the west until he settled in Colfax in 1883, marrying and starting a general store. At the same time he began buying agricultural land, primarily for wheat and fruit production. In 1901 Kuhn planned for a tramway at the Snake River Breaks, estimating the cost at $7500 to $8000. Leaving the construction in the hands of Kuhn's general manager Seymour Manning, Kuhn took his family on a tour of Europe. The tram was completed in time for the fall harvest. The next year Kuhn sold most of his properties in Colfax and moved to Spokane, where he became involved in banking and railroads.

The tram was acquired by the Balfour-Guthrie Company of Portland, Oregon, who operated the tram and warehouses as the Interior Warehouse Company. By 1908 a railroad line along the Snake passed the lower terminus and sternwheel paddleboats were discontinued. The grain was loaded onto boxcars. By 1938 the railroad system had branched into the interior and the tramway was no longer necessary to move wheat to the rail lines.

== Description ==
The tram was constructed along the same lines as a modern ski lift. A continuous wire cable ran in a loop carrying 130-pound (59 kg) feed sacks. The weight of the sacks as they descended operated the tram, with 64 loaded sacks and 64 empties over the length of the tram. A brakeman at the upper terminal controlled the rate of descent, squeezing the cable with a grip brake. At either end the cable loops back on an 8-foot (2.4 m) diameter wheel. The towers are of wood construction, between 6 feet (1.8 m) and 13 feet (4.0 m) high. The original terminal and lowermost towers were submerged when the level of the Snake was raised 50 feet (15 m) by the construction of Lower Granite Dam.

The Interior Grain Tramway was placed on the National Register of Historic Places on September 22, 1988.
