= Masonic Hall–Federal Commissary Building =

- U.S. National Register of Historic Places
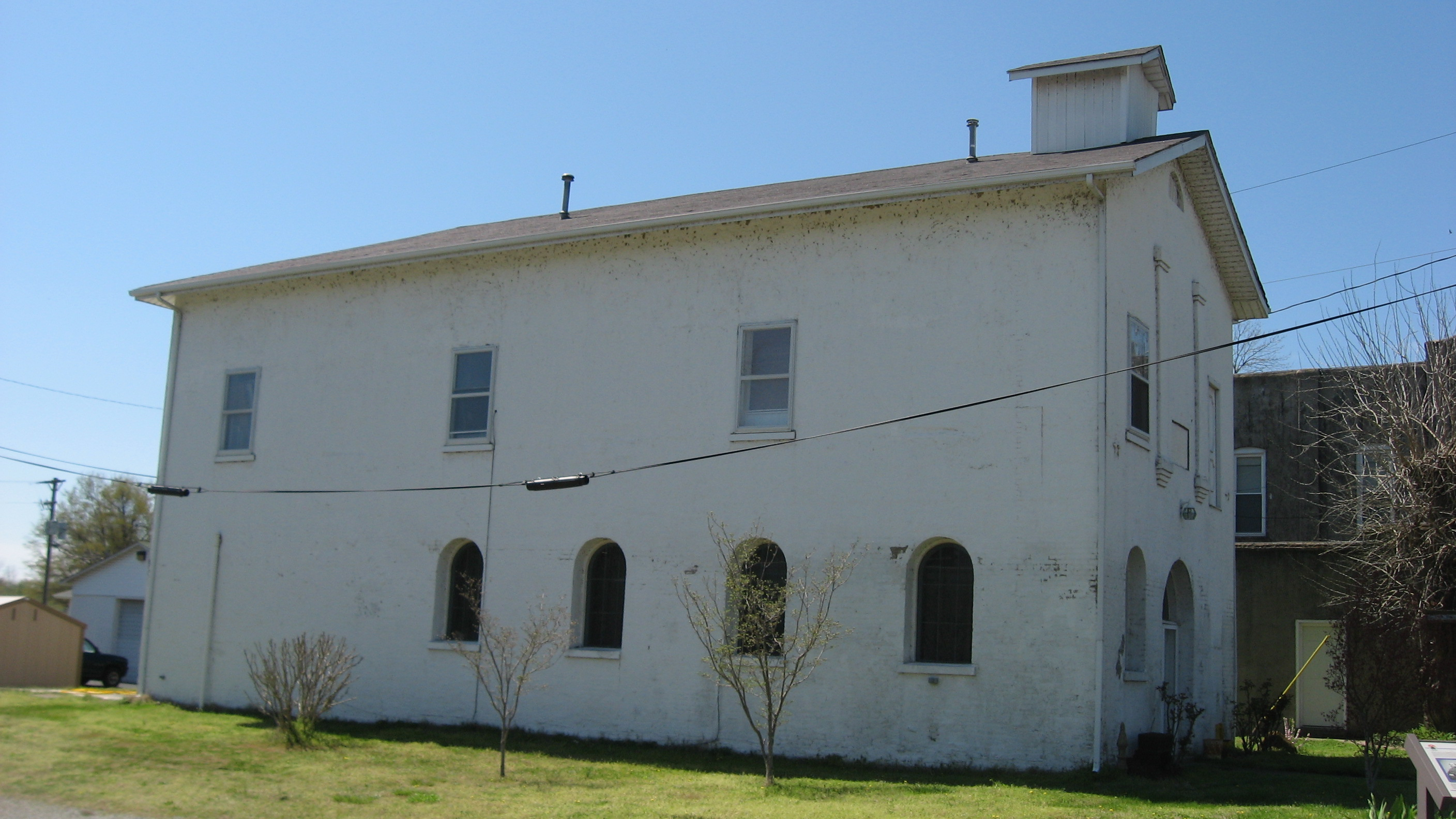
- Eastern side of the building

- Location within Kentucky Location within the United States
- Nearest city: Smithland, Kentucky
- Coordinates: 37°8′25″N 88°24′24″W
- Area: less than one acre
- Architectural style: Commercial
- MPS: Caught in the Middle: The Civil War on the Lower Ohio River MPS
- NRHP reference No.: 98000939
- Added to NRHP: August 13, 1998

The Masonic Hall in Smithland, Kentucky (also known as The Second Baptist Church), is a historic building constructed in 1860 and listed on the National Register of Historic Places in 1998. It was originally constructed as a meeting hall for the local Masonic lodges (who continued to meet in the building until the 1960s). During the American Civil War it was used by the Federal Government as a Commissary office and store house. The basement of the building was occupied by the First Baptist Church from 1887 to 1913. The Masons sold the building in the 1960s and it became a restaurant. Since 1980, it has housed the Second Baptist (Mission) Church.
