= Masonic Hall (Eastwood, Kentucky) =

- U.S. National Register of Historic Places
- Location within Kentucky Location within the United States
- Nearest city: Fisherville, Louisville, Kentucky
- Coordinates: 38°11′21″N 85°27′42″W
- Area: less than one acre
- Built: 1852
- MPS: Jefferson County MRA
- NRHP reference No.: 83002701
- Added to NRHP: July 12, 1983

The Masonic Temple in the Fisherville neighborhood of Louisville, Kentucky is a historic building from at least 1852. It was listed on the National Register of Historic Places in 1983.

Originally the building was jointly owned and used by two Religious denominations (the Fisherville Christian Church, and the Fisherville Baptist Church) and the local Masonic lodge (Philip Swigert Lodge No. 218). The Christian Church sold its shares to the Baptist Church in 1881. The Masons and the Baptist Church continued to share the premises until 1951, when the Baptist congregation sold its share to the lodge. In 1975 the Masons moved to a new building and sold the property. It is now in private hands.

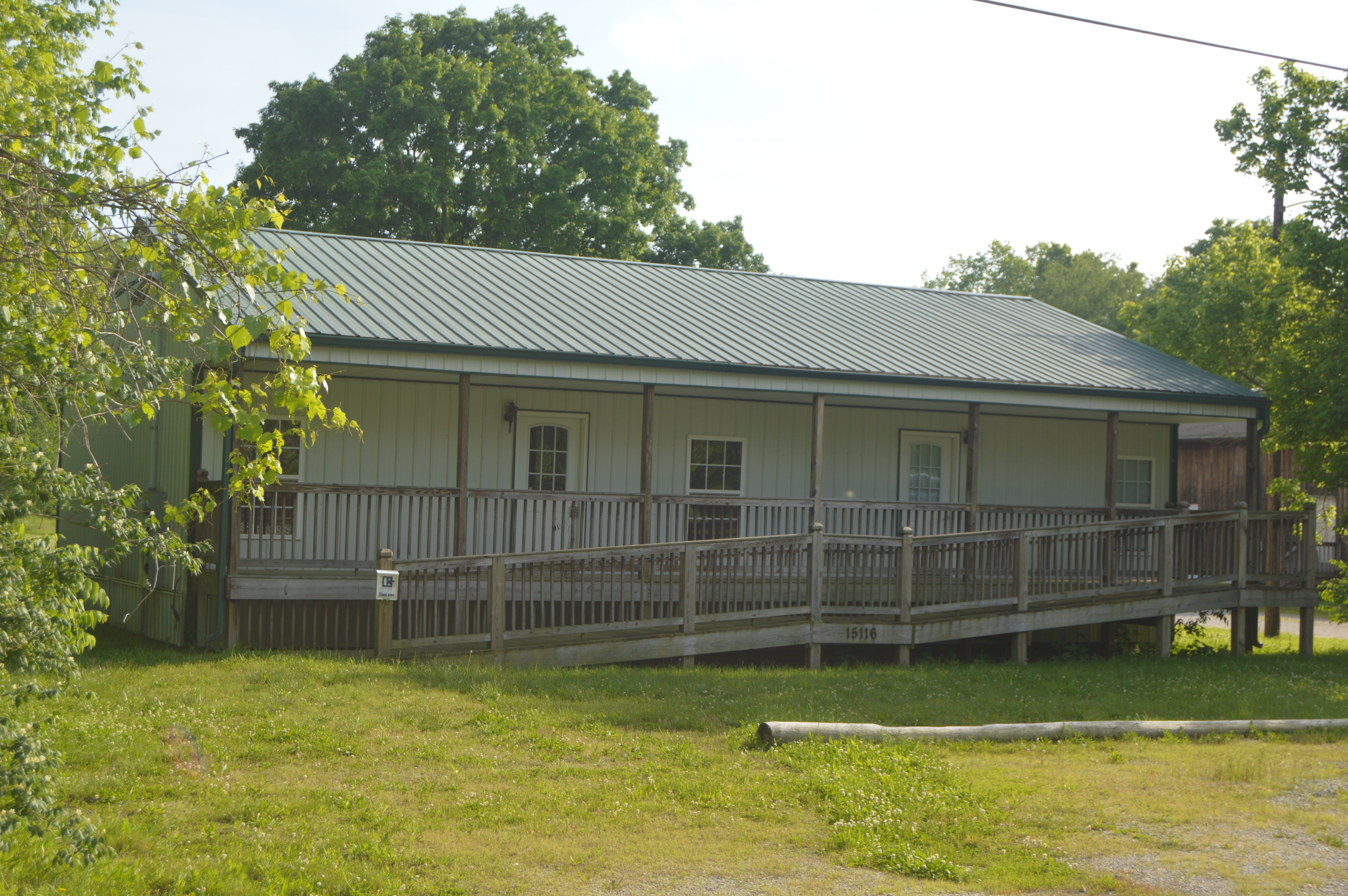
Building on the site of the former Masonic hall

It appears that the building has been destroyed.
