= Pullman Flatiron Building =

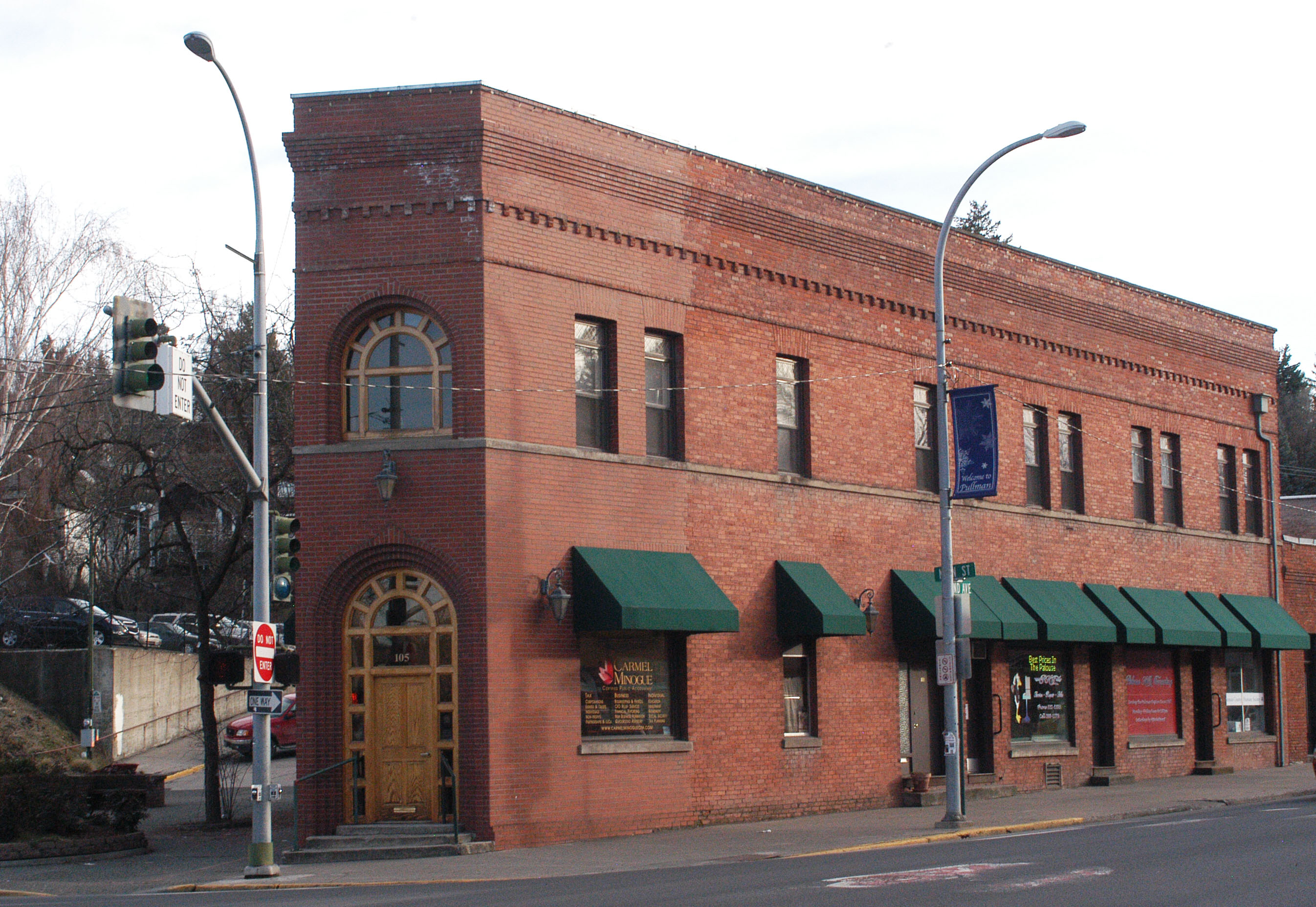
- Flatiron Building in 2010. Non-matching flat-toned brickwork towards the front, rather than the use of tapestry brick, reflects reconstruction after 1994 damage.

- Location within Washington (state)
- 46.72955°N 117.18182°W
- Location: E. Main St. & S. Grand Ave., Pullman, Washington

History
- Built: 1905

The Pullman Flatiron Building in downtown Pullman, Washington, in Whitman County, also known as Flatiron Building, was constructed in 1904-05. It faces Main Street and is located between Grand Avenue and the High Street plaza. It was designed by William Swain, a prolific local architect who is considered to be Pullman's first. The two-story flatiron was built as an office building in a triangular shape, on what's stated to be the only triangular lot in the city, conforming to the angle between two grids of streets. Multiple businesses have occupied the building over its lifetime, including banks, insurance companies, and a dentist.

== History ==
=== Architect ===
William Swain was born in England in 1861 and immigrated to the United States at twenty years old. He first resided in Minnesota, where he worked as a carpenter, contractor, and finally an architect, before he moved to Pullman around 1891. He then designed and constructed buildings throughout the Palouse region. Two of the buildings that remain standing are listed on the National Register of Historic Places, a Craftsman Style house now known as the William Swain House, at 315 West Main Street, about two blocks west of the Flatiron, and the Greystone Church, originally the New Presbyterian Church, which is located at 430 NE Maple Street.

Swain built several other buildings in Pullman which are no longer in existence. He designed the original City Hall built in 1892. It served as the city hall until the 1930s when it became the police department and fire station building. It was later demolished in the 1980s and is marked only by a small plaque today. He also designed the Artesian Hotel in 1893, which was located directly across Grand Avenue from the site of the Flatiron. The Artesian Hotel was destroyed by fire in the 1920s. The original high school of Pullman was also a design of William Swain's. It was built in 1893 and was destroyed by fire in the 1920s, and was later rebuilt.

In addition to architecture and construction, Swain also worked in the local government. He first served two terms as city clerk twice before elected as treasurer. He next became a Police Court Judge and then Justice of the Peace. Finally, he served two years as Pullman Mayor from 1917 to 1919.

He was a member of, or otherwise associated with, the Knights of Pythias, the Woodmen of the World and the Foresters fraternal societies.

=== Flatiron Building construction ===
The building's construction started two years after the building of the more famous Flatiron Building in New York City, which was built as a 20-story, steel-framed skyscraper. The Pullman building, instead, is two-stories tall and is held up by load-bearing brick walls.

=== Businesses in the Flatiron ===
The Flatiron Building has been home to many businesses since its completion. In the beginning, the front office was used by Grain Companies, Pullman Savings and Loan, and Farmers State Bank. More recently, State Farm Insurance occupied the front office, from 1957 into the 1990s and was commonly associated with the Flatiron Building, and being located on such a prominent corner. Dr. Low's dental office was located on the upper floor of the Flatiron building for a period of time as well. Dr. Marc Swindal opened his optometry practice in the Flatiron Building in 1951 and became the building owner in 1969. Selene Santucci set up an art studio on the second floor and became a permanent resident of the Flatiron Building. She became the building owner after Swindal retired. Various modern businesses now inhabit the ground floor.

=== 1994 damage and restoration ===
Some preservation has already been necessary, after a destructive accident in February 1994. A runaway 25-ton front-end loader came barreling down the road and smashed into the prow of the building, reducing about one-fourth of the building to rubble. After clean-up, both floors were left exposed and were closed off. It was determined that the building was still safe and structurally sound, since the floors and structural beams ran parallel to the collision, which ultimately saved it from demolition. After several months of reconstruction, the Flatiron was completed with new elements included. The front façade of the building featured new arched windows on both floors, and a front door framed with windows. Green awnings were added to the doorways along the ground floor, and lamps were placed in the walls. With these exceptions, Swindal chose to restore the façade as accurately as possible, to maintain the original historic look the building, including some use of intact bricks salvaged from the rubble. The resulting restoration can be seen in the 2010 photo above, however it is clear that the brickwork at the front does not match the original tapestry brick of the rest of the building.

In 2023, the building's "prow", at the intersection of Main Street and Grand Avenue, has been prominent in Pullman for almost 120 years.

== See also ==
- Flatiron Building (Portland, Oregon), 1916
- List of buildings named Flatiron Building
