= Masonic Hall (Whitewood, Saskatchewan) =

Coordinates: 50.3302°N 102.2694°W

Masonic Hall (Methodist Church) (Ashlar Lodge No. 8)
- Interactive map of the Masonic Hall (Methodist Church) (Ashlar Lodge No. 8) area

General information
- Location: 503 Third Avenue, Whitewood, Saskatchewan, Canada
- Construction started: 1892
- Completed: 1892

The Masonic Hall building is located at 503 Third Avenue in Whitewood, Saskatchewan, Canada. The building is a designated Heritage Property. Originally built to house the Methodist Church in served as church until 1910. Masonic Lodge purchased the building in 1920 and it served as the home for the lar Masonic Lodge #8 until 1987 when the lodge merged with a lodge in Moosomin, Saskatchewan. The building is now used as local hall in the community.
