= Hay, Washington =

Unincorporated community in Washington, United States

- Unincorporated community
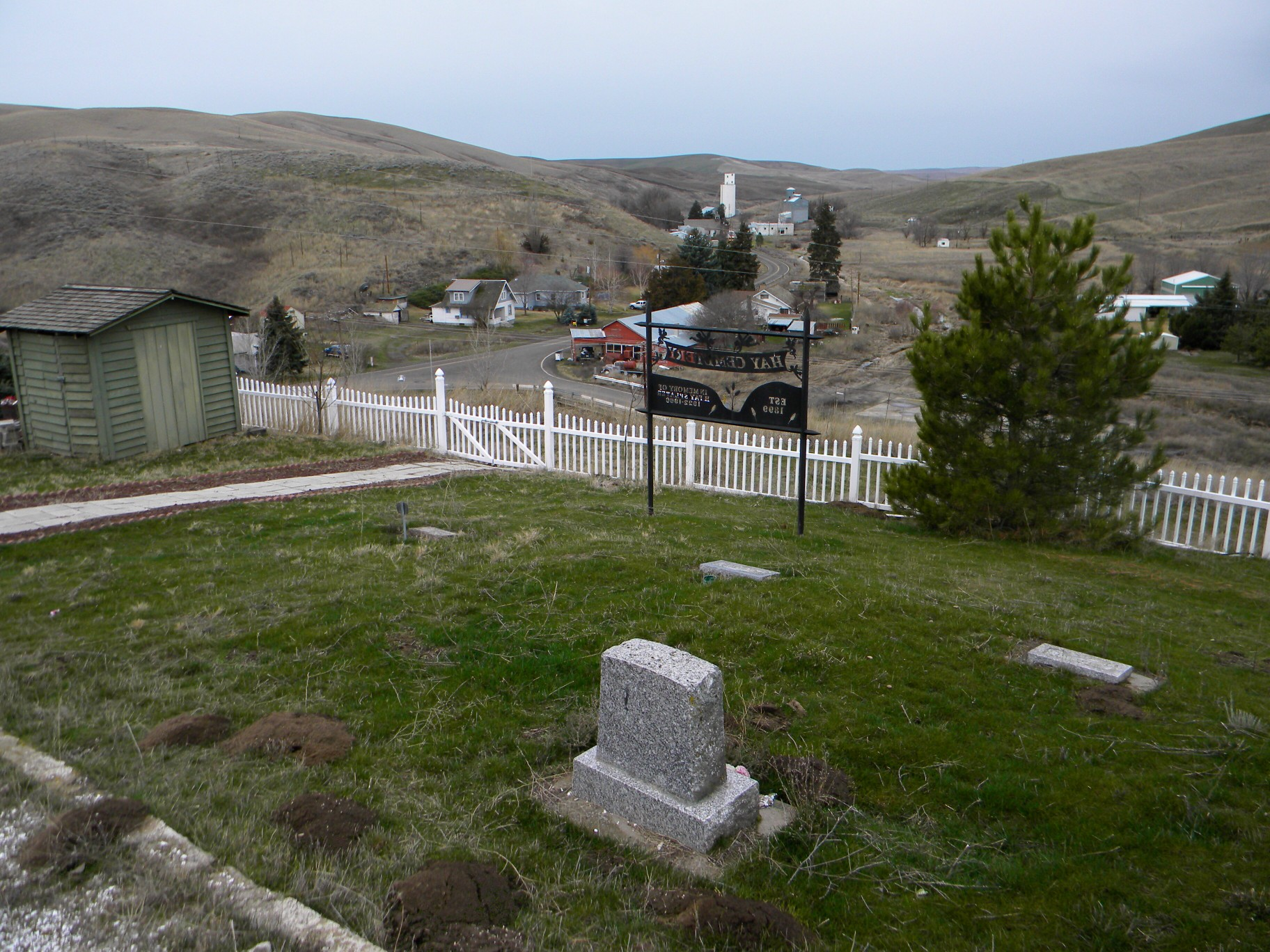
- Hay Cemetery

- Location within Washington (state)
- Coordinates: 46°40′44″N 117°54′57″W
- Country: United States
- State: Washington
- County: Whitman
- Elevation: 1,089 ft (332 m)
- Time zone: UTC-8 (PST)
  - Summer (DST): UTC-7 (PDT)
- ZIP code: 99136
- Area code: 509
- GNIS feature ID: 1512282

Hay is an unincorporated community in Whitman County, Washington, United States. Hay is 9.5 miles (15.3 km) south of La Crosse. Hay has a post office with ZIP code 99136.
