= Provincial Grand Lodge =

A Provincial Grand Lodge is an administrative subdivision of a Grand Lodge. Under the jurisdiction of the United Grand Lodge of England, they are the regional governing bodies of Freemasonry in the England, Wales, the Isle of Man, and the Channel Islands. The overseas equivalent is the, District Grand Lodge, headed by a District Grand Master.

There are currently 47 Provincial Grand Lodges governed by UGLE, whose boundaries largely correspond to those of the historic counties of England. Each Provincial Grand Lodge is headed by a Provincial Grand Master.

The Grand Lodge uses a broadly similar administrative system for groups of lodges overseas, although these units are termed "District Grand Lodges". The Constitutions of the Grand Lodge also permit the formation of a similar administrative system for any large urban metropolitan area, to be known as a "Metropolitan Grand Lodge". At present only one such unit has been established, namely the Metropolitan Grand Lodge of London.

== Provincial Grand Lodges ==
| Provincial Grand Lodge | Formation Year | Notes |
|---|---|---|
| Bedfordshire | 1885 | |
| Berkshire | 1773 | then called Berkshire & Buckinghamshire PGL but were divided in 1890 |
| Bristol | 1786 | |
| Buckinghamshire | 1890 | |
| Cambridgeshire | 1796 | |
| Cheshire | 1725 | |
| Cornwall | | |
| Cumberland and Westmorland | 1860 | |
| Derbyshire | 1826 | The first meeting of Derbyshire Provincial Grand Lodge was in 1826, however, Thomas Boothby Parkyns was made Provincial Grand Master in 1788, inferring a much earlier existence. |
| Devonshire | 1775 | |
| Dorset | 1780 | |
| Durham | 1788 | |
| Essex | 1776 | |
| Gloucestershire | 1738 | |
| Guernsey and Alderney | 1753 | |
| Hampshire & Isle of Wight | 1767 | |
| Herefordshire | 1727 | Herefordshire was originally included in a wider province called "The Western Shires" |
| Hertfordshire | | |
| Isle of Man | 1886 | |
| Jersey | 1753 | |
| East Kent | 1770 | (Kent PGL was inaugurated in 1770 and split into East & West Kent in 1973) |
| West Kent | 1770 | (Kent PGL was inaugurated in 1770 and split into East & West Kent in 1973) |
| East Lancashire | 1826 | (Known previously as East Lancashire Division since 1826) |
| West Lancashire | 1826 | (Known previously as Lancashire West Division since 1826) |
| Leicestershire & Rutland | | |
| Lincolnshire | 1792 | |
| Middlesex | 1870 | |
| Monmouthshire | | |
| Norfolk | 1759 | Edward Bacon esq. was elected the first Provincial Grand Master of Norfolk on 15th August 1758, appointed on 13th January 1759 and the Provincial Grand Lodge held its first meeting on 6th September 1759 at the Three Tuns, London Lane, Norwich. |
| Northamptonshire & Huntingdonshire | 1798 | (as Northamptonshire PGL then as combined PGL in 1840) |
| Northumberland | 1734 | |
| Nottinghamshire | | |
| Oxfordshire | 1729 | |
| Shropshire | | |
| Somerset | | |
| Staffordshire | 1791 | |
| Suffolk | 1772 | |
| Surrey | 1837 | |
| Sussex | | |
| North Wales | 1727 | |
| South Wales | | |
| West Wales | | |
| Warwickshire | 1728 | |
| Wiltshire | 1775 | |
| Worcestershire | 1847 | |
| Yorkshire, North & East Ridings | 1817 | |
| Yorkshire, West Riding | 1817 | |
