= Farmington, Washington =

Farmington
- Town
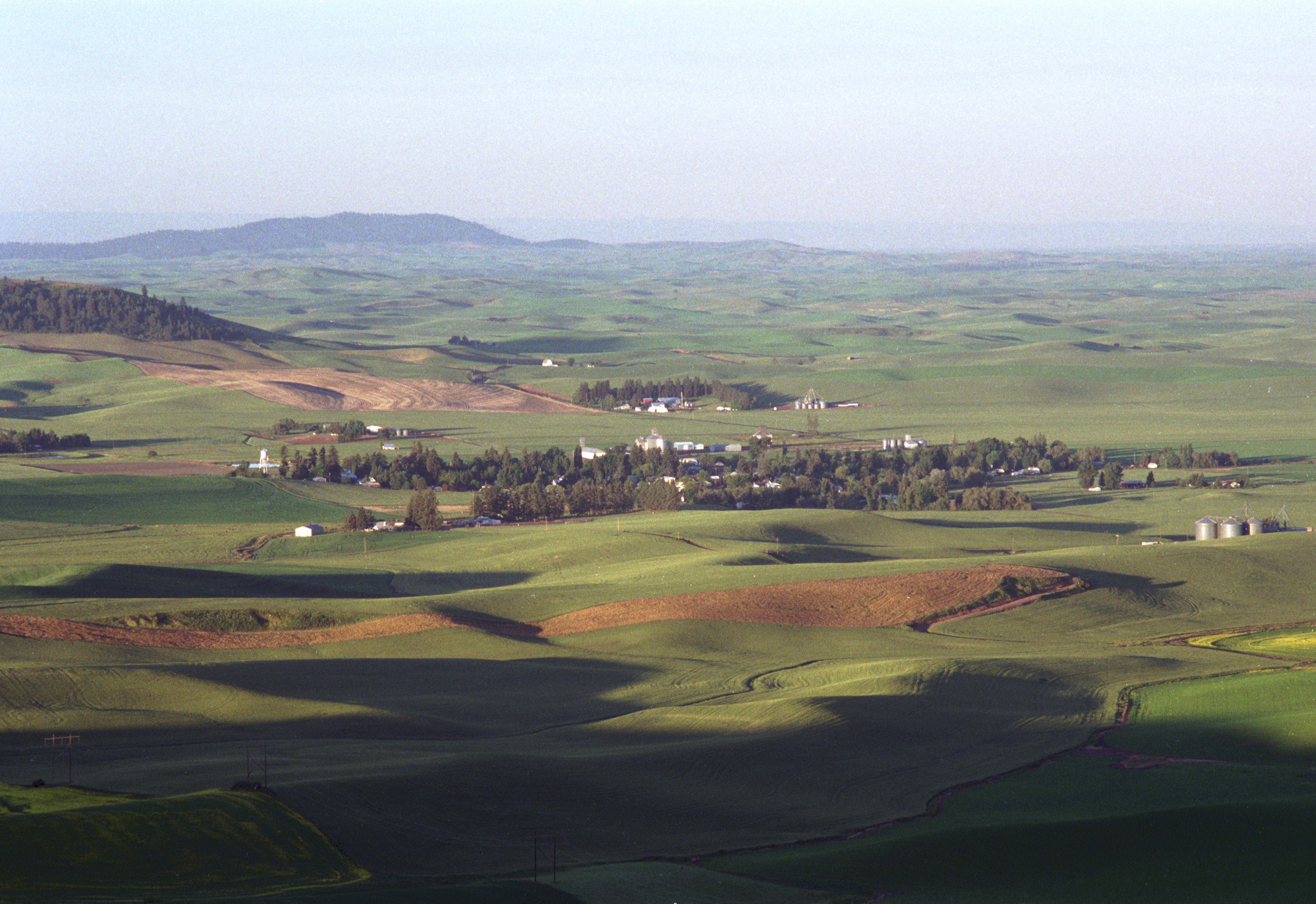
- Farmington
- Interactive map of Farmington
- Coordinates: 47°05′19″N 117°02′47″W
- Country: United States
- State: Washington
- County: Whitman
- First Settled: 1871
- Founded: 1878
- Incorporated: 1888

Government
  - Type: Mayor–council
  - Mayor: Blanche Rhea

Area
  - Total: 0.36 sq mi (0.94 km^{2})
  - Land: 0.36 sq mi (0.94 km^{2})
  - Water: 0 sq mi (0.00 km^{2})
- Elevation: 2,631 ft (802 m)

Population (2020)
  - Total: 131
  - Estimate (2024): 134
  - Density: 420.0/sq mi (162.18/km^{2})
- Time zone: UTC–8 (Pacific (PST))
  - Summer (DST): UTC–7 (PDT)
- ZIP codes: 99104, 99128
- Area code: 509
- FIPS code: 53-23340
- GNIS feature ID: 2412622
- Website: farmingtonwa.com

Farmington is a town in Whitman County, Washington, United States. The population was 131 at the 2020 census.

== History ==
Farmington was laid out in 1878. Farmington was officially incorporated in 1888. At Farmington's peak (1900–1930) the town boasted a population of just under 500. As demand for farm labor decreased, the population and business of the town decreased. Today, Farmington has a population of about 150.

Farmington was settled as Pine Creek, and incorporated as Farmington in 1888, when the population peaked at 1,200.

== Geography ==
According to the United States Census Bureau, the town has a total area of 0.34 square miles (0.88 km^{2}), all of it land.

== Demographics ==
Historical population
Census	Pop.	Note	%±
1880	76		—
1890	418		450.0%
1900	434		3.8%
1910	489		12.7%
1920	479		−2.0%
1930	344		−28.2%
1940	341		−0.9%
1950	239		−29.9%
1960	176		−26.4%
1970	140		−20.5%
1980	176		25.7%
1990	126		−28.4%
2000	153		21.4%
2010	146		−4.6%
2020	131		−10.3%
2024 (est.)	134	▲	2.3%
U.S. Decennial Census; 2020 Census

=== 2010 census ===
As of the 2010 census, there were 146 people, 54 households, and 41 families living in the town. The population density was 429.4 inhabitants per square mile (165.8/km^{2}). There were 65 housing units at an average density of 191.2 per square mile (73.8/km^{2}). The racial makeup of the town was 97.3% White and 2.7% Native American. Hispanic or Latino of any race were 2.1% of the population.

There were 54 households, of which 35.2% had children under the age of 18 living with them, 66.7% were married couples living together, 7.4% had a female householder with no husband present, 1.9% had a male householder with no wife present, and 24.1% were non-families. 24.1% of all households were made up of individuals, and 7.5% had someone living alone who was 65 years of age or older. The average household size was 2.70 and the average family size was 3.20.

The median age in the town was 42.3 years. 26% of residents were under the age of 18; 6.2% were between the ages of 18 and 24; 23.9% were from 25 to 44; 27.4% were from 45 to 64; and 16.4% were 65 years of age or older. The gender makeup of the town was 53.4% male and 46.6% female.

=== 2000 census ===
As of the 2000 census, there were 153 people, 56 households, and 38 families living in the town. The population density was 445.3 people per square mile (173.7/km^{2}). There were 64 housing units at an average density of 186.3 per square mile (72.7/km^{2}). The racial makeup of the town was 98.04% White, 1.31% Native American and 0.65% Asian. Hispanic or Latino of any race were 5.88% of the population.

There were 56 households, out of which 37.5% had children under the age of 18 living with them, 55.4% were married couples living together, 8.9% had a female householder with no husband present, and 32.1% were non-families. 32.1% of all households were made up of individuals, and 16.1% had someone living alone who was 65 years of age or older. The average household size was 2.73 and the average family size was 3.47.

In the town, the age distribution of the population shows 36.6% under the age of 18, 3.9% from 18 to 24, 20.9% from 25 to 44, 27.5% from 45 to 64, and 11.1% who were 65 years of age or older. The median age was 37 years. For every 100 females, there were 91.3 males. For every 100 females age 18 and over, there were 90.2 males.

The median income for a household in the town was $27,250, and the median income for a family was $39,063. Males had a median income of $41,875 versus $26,250 for females. The per capita income for the town was $13,099. About 8.0% of families and 7.9% of the population were below the poverty line, including none of those under the age of eighteen and 5.9% of those 65 or over.

== Government ==
Farmington is governed by an elected five-member council and mayor. As of 2023, the city had 1 full-time and 2 part-time employees, and an annual revenue of $189,000.
