= United Presbyterian Church (Pullman, Washington) =

Historic church in Washington, United States

- U.S. National Register of Historic Places
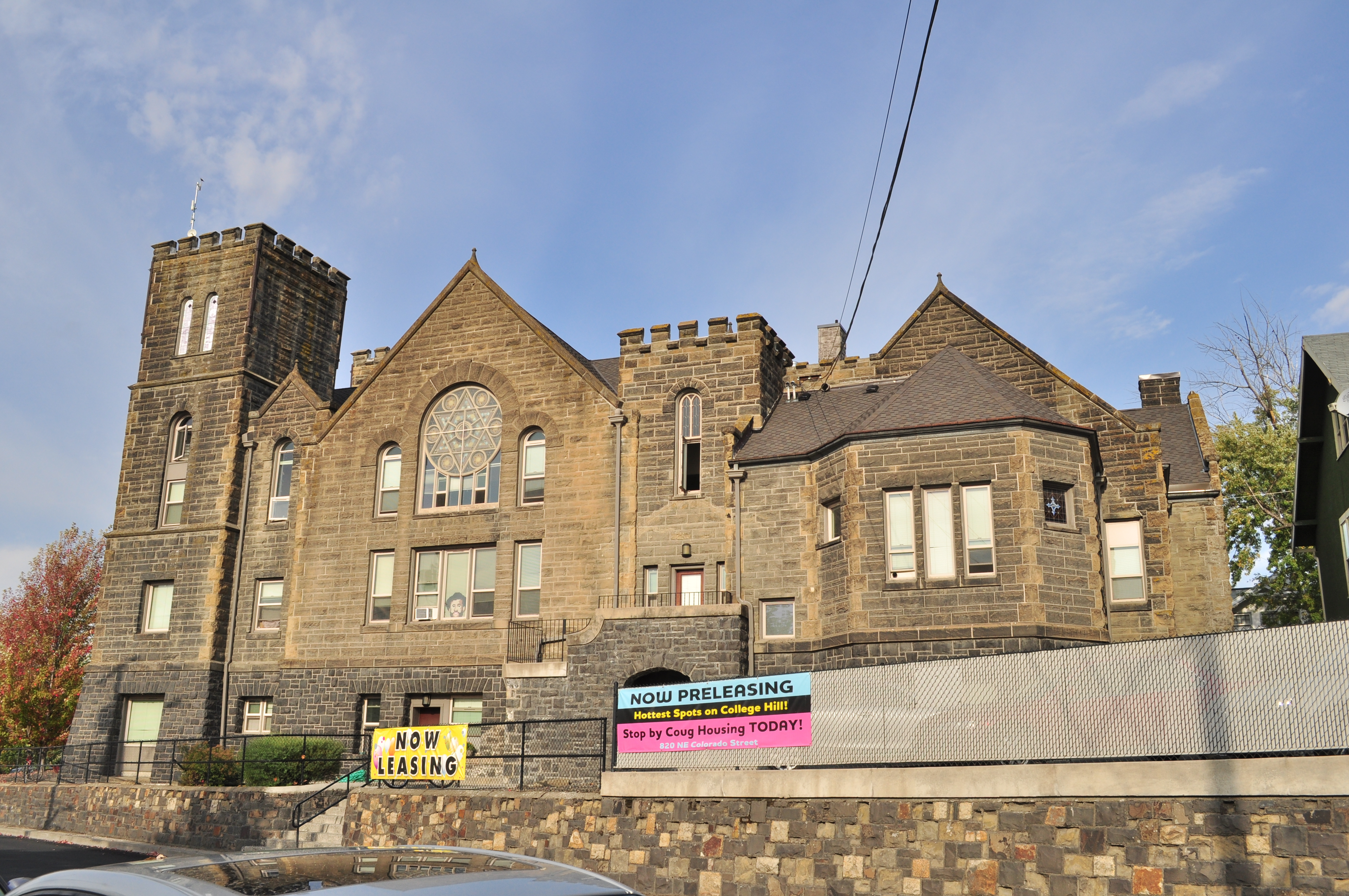
- The former church, now an apartment building (2014)

- Location within Washington (state)
- Location: 430 Maple Street, Pullman, Washington
- Coordinates: 46°43′54″N 117°10′32″W
- Area: less than one acre
- Built: 1914
- Architect: William Swain
- Architectural style: Romanesque Revival
- NRHP reference No.: 89002095
- Added to NRHP: December 7, 1989

The United Presbyterian Church in Pullman, Washington, also known as the Greystone Church, is a historic Presbyterian church which was listed on the National Register of Historic Places in 1989. After being slated for demolition in 2002 the building was purchased and restored. In 2018 it was listed on the Pullman Register of Historic Places. In 2023, it is an apartment building.

Mainly built in 1914, it is a "massive structure built of quarry-faced, ashlar Tenino sandstone on a base of rough cut basalt". It was designed by prolific local architect William Swain.

The original church on the site was a wood frame building built in 1898-99. In 1912 this building was moved to the back of the property and rotated 90 degrees. A larger stone church was built in front in 1914, and the original building was faced in the same quarry-faced stone to unify the entire composition."

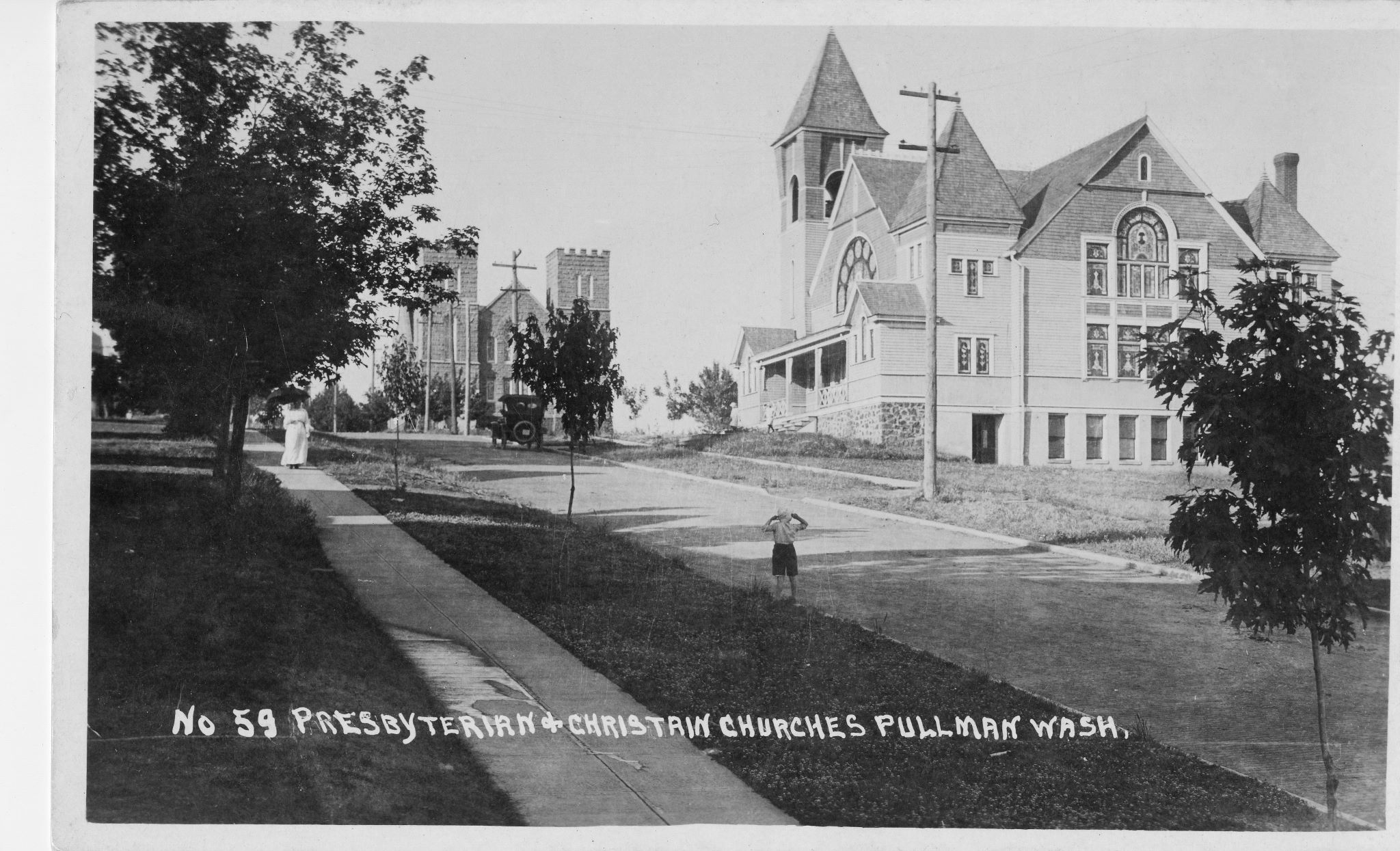
At the top of the hill on an early postcard
