= Masonic Temple (disambiguation) =

A Masonic Temple is the conceptual ritualistic space formed when a Masonic Lodge meets, and the physical rooms and structures in which it meets. It is also used in allegorical terms to describe a philosophical goal (where Masons strive to build a personal Masonic temple of ethics).

Masonic Temple may also refer to specific buildings:

In Australia

- Masonic Memorial Temple (Brisbane)

In Canada:

- Masonic Temple (St. John's, Newfoundland and Labrador)
- Masonic Temple (Toronto)
- Masonic Temple (Victoria, British Columbia)
- Masonic Temple (Windsor, Ontario)

In Pakistan:

- Masonic Temple (Lahore)

In Spain:

- Masonic Temple of Santa Cruz de Tenerife, Canary Islands

In the United States:

- Masonic Temple (Fairbanks, Alaska)
- Masonic Temple (El Dorado, Arkansas)
- Masonic Temple (Pine Bluff, Arkansas)
- Masonic Temple (Kingman, Arizona)
- Masonic Temple (Yuma, Arizona)
- Masonic Temple and Lodge (Alameda, California)
- Masonic Temple (Berkeley, California)
- Masonic Temple (Ferndale, California)
- Masonic Temple (Fullerton, California)
- Masonic Temple (Long Beach, California)
- Masonic Temple (Riverside, California)
- Masonic Temple Building (Denver, Colorado)
- Masonic Temple (New Britain, Connecticut)
- Masonic Temple (Washington, D.C.)
- Masonic Temple (Gainesville, Florida)
- Masonic Temple (Jacksonville, Florida)
- Masonic Temple No. 25, Tampa, Florida
- Masonic Temple (Atlanta)
- Masonic Temple (Aurora, Illinois)
- Masonic Temple (Chicago, Illinois), a skyscraper
- Masonic Temple Building (Maywood, Illinois)
- Masonic Temple Building (Oak Park, Illinois)
- Masonic Temple (Evansville, Indiana)
- Masonic Temple (Fort Wayne, Indiana)
- Masonic Temple (Franklin, Indiana)
- Masonic Temple (Lagro, Indiana)
- Masonic Temple (Muncie, Indiana)
- Masonic Temple (Ames, Iowa)
- Masonic Temple of Des Moines, Iowa
- Masonic Temple Theater, Mount Pleasant, Iowa
- Masonic Temple Building (Stuart, Iowa)
- Masonic Temple (Salina, Kansas)
- Masonic Temple (Paducah, Kentucky)
- Masonic Temple (Shreveport, Louisiana)
- Masonic Temple (Belfast, Maine)
- Masonic Temple (Portland, Maine)
- Masonic Temple (Quincy, Massachusetts)
- Masonic Temple (Springfield, Massachusetts)
- Masonic Temple (Worcester, Massachusetts)
- Masonic Temple (Coldwater, Michigan), listed as a Michigan State Historic Site in Branch County
- Detroit Masonic Temple, Detroit, Michigan
- Masonic Temple Building (Cadillac, Michigan)
- Masonic Temple Building (East Lansing, Michigan)
- Masonic Temple Building (Kalamazoo, Michigan)
- Masonic Temple Building (Lansing, Michigan)
- Masonic Temple Building (Marshall, Michigan)
- Masonic Temple (Port Hope, Michigan)
- Old Masonic Temple (Marshall, Minnesota)
- Hennepin Center for the Arts, Minneapolis, Minnesota, formerly known as Masonic Temple
- Masonic Temple (Hattiesburg, Mississippi)
- Masonic Temple (Meridian, Mississippi)
- Masonic Temple (Kirksville, Missouri)
- Masonic Temple (Warrensburg, Missouri)
- Mount Zion Lodge Masonic Temple, West Plains, Missouri
- Masonic Temple (Billings, Montana)
- Masonic Temple (Great Falls, Montana)
- Masonic Temple (Lewistown, Montana)
- Masonic Temple (Lincoln, Nebraska)
- Masonic Temple and Theater, New Bern, North Carolina
- Masonic Temple Building (Blount Street, Raleigh, North Carolina)
- Masonic Temple Building (Fayetteville Street, Raleigh, North Carolina)
- Masonic Temple Building (Shelby, North Carolina)
- Masonic Temple (Grand Forks, North Dakota)
- Masonic Temple (Columbus, Ohio)
- Masonic Temple (Kent, Ohio)
- Masonic Temple (Mechanicsburg, Ohio)
- Masonic Temple (Sandusky, Ohio)
- Masonic Temple (Springfield, Ohio)
- Masonic Temple Building (Vermilion, Ohio)
- Masonic Temple (Youngstown, Ohio)
- Masonic Temple Building (Zanesville, Ohio)
- Masonic Temple (Atoka, Oklahoma)
- Masonic Temple (Pendleton, Oregon)
- Masonic Temple (Chambersburg, Pennsylvania)
- Masonic Temple (Philadelphia, Pennsylvania), also known as Grand Lodge of Pennsylvania
- Masonic Temple and Scottish Rite Cathedral, Scranton, Pennsylvania, now known as Scranton Cultural Center
- Masonic Temple (Aberdeen, South Dakota)
- Masonic Temple (Burlington, Vermont), part of the Head of Church Street Historic District, listed on the NRHP
- Masonic Temple (Richmond, Virginia)
- Masonic Temple-Hoquiam, Hoquiam, Washington
- Masonic Temple (Port Angeles, Washington)
- Masonic Temple Building-Temple Theater, Tacoma, Washington
- Masonic Temple (Yakima, Washington)
- Masonic Temple (Fairmont, West Virginia)
- Masonic Temple-Watts, Ritter, Wholesale Drygoods Company Building, Huntington, West Virginia
- Masonic Temple (Parkersburg, West Virginia)
- Masonic Temple (Appleton, Wisconsin), also known as The History Museum at the Castle
- Masonic Temple Building (Viroqua, Wisconsin)
- Masonic Temple (Casper, Wyoming)
- Masonic Temple (Cheyenne, Wyoming)
- Masonic Temple (Rock Springs, Wyoming)
- Masonic Temple (Huntington, West Virginia)

== See also ==
- List of Masonic buildings
- Masonic Temple (Grand Canyon)
- Mason Temple
- Masonic Lodge (disambiguation)
- Masonic Building (disambiguation)
