= Masonic Temple Building =

Masonic Temple Building may refer to:

- Masonic Temple Building (Denver, Colorado), listed on the National Register of Historic Places (NRHP) in Colorado
- Masonic Temple Building (Maywood, Illinois), listed on the NRHP in Illinois
- Masonic Temple Building (Oak Park, Illinois), listed on the NRHP in Illinois
- Masonic Temple Building (Stuart, Iowa), listed on the NRHP in Iowa
- Masonic Temple Building (Cadillac, Michigan), listed on the NRHP in Michigan
- Masonic Temple Building (East Lansing, Michigan), listed on the NRHP in Michigan
- Masonic Temple Building (Kalamazoo, Michigan), listed on the NRHP in Michigan
- Masonic Temple Building (Lansing, Michigan), listed on the NRHP in Michigan
- Masonic Temple Building (Marshall, Michigan), listed on the NRHP in Michigan
- Masonic Temple Building, Blount Street (Raleigh, North Carolina), listed on the NRHP in North Carolina
- Masonic Temple Building, Fayetteville Street (Raleigh, North Carolina), listed on the NRHP in North Carolina
- Masonic Temple Building (Shelby, North Carolina), listed on the NRHP in North Carolina
- Masonic Temple Building (Vermilion, Ohio), listed on the NRHP in Ohio
- Masonic Temple Building (Zanesville, Ohio), listed on the NRHP in Ohio
- Masonic Temple Building (Viroqua, Wisconsin), listed on the NRHP in Wisconsin
- Masonic Temple Building (Tacoma, Washington)

== See also ==
- List of Masonic buildings
- List of Masonic buildings in the United States
- Masonic Hall (disambiguation)
- Masonic Temple (disambiguation)
- Masonic Building (disambiguation)
