= Masonic Block =

Masonic Block may refer to:

- Masonic Block (Reading, Massachusetts)
- Masonic Block building within Casselton Commercial Historic District, Casselton, North Dakota
- Masonic Block (Fargo, North Dakota)

== See also ==
- List of Masonic buildings
- Masonic Temple (disambiguation)
- Masonic Lodge (disambiguation)
- Masonic Building (disambiguation)
