= Temple Building =

Temple Building may refer to:

in Canada

- Temple Building (Toronto)

in the United States

- Temple Building (Marlborough, Massachusetts), listed on the NRHP in Massachusetts
- Temple Block Building, Kansas City, Missouri, listed on the NRHP in Jackson County, Missouri
- Temple Building (Rochester, New York), a tall building

== See also ==
- Masonic Temple Building (disambiguation)
- Elks Temple Building
- Temple Theater (disambiguation)
