= Masonic Lodge (disambiguation) =

A Masonic Lodge is a basic organizational unit in Freemasonry.

Masonic Lodge may also refer to one of several specific buildings:

- Masonic Lodge No. 238, Dalton, Georgia, listed on the National Register of Historic Places (NRHP)
- Masonic Lodge (Grandin, Missouri), listed on the NRHP
- Masonic Lodge (Missoula, Montana), listed on the NRHP
- Masonic Lodge No. 472, Zaleski, Ohio, listed on the NRHP
- Masonic Lodge 570, San Angelo, Texas, listed on the NRHP
- Masonic Lodge Building (Kirkland, Washington), listed on the NRHP

== Australia ==
- Charters Towers Masonic Lodge, Queensland
- Isis Masonic Lodge, Childers, Queensland
- Mount Perry Masonic Lodge, Queensland

== See also ==
- Masonic Temple (disambiguation)
- Masonic Hall (disambiguation)
- Masonic Building (disambiguation)
- List of Masonic buildings
