= Lewistown Central Business Historic District =

Historic district in Montana, United States

- U.S. National Register of Historic Places
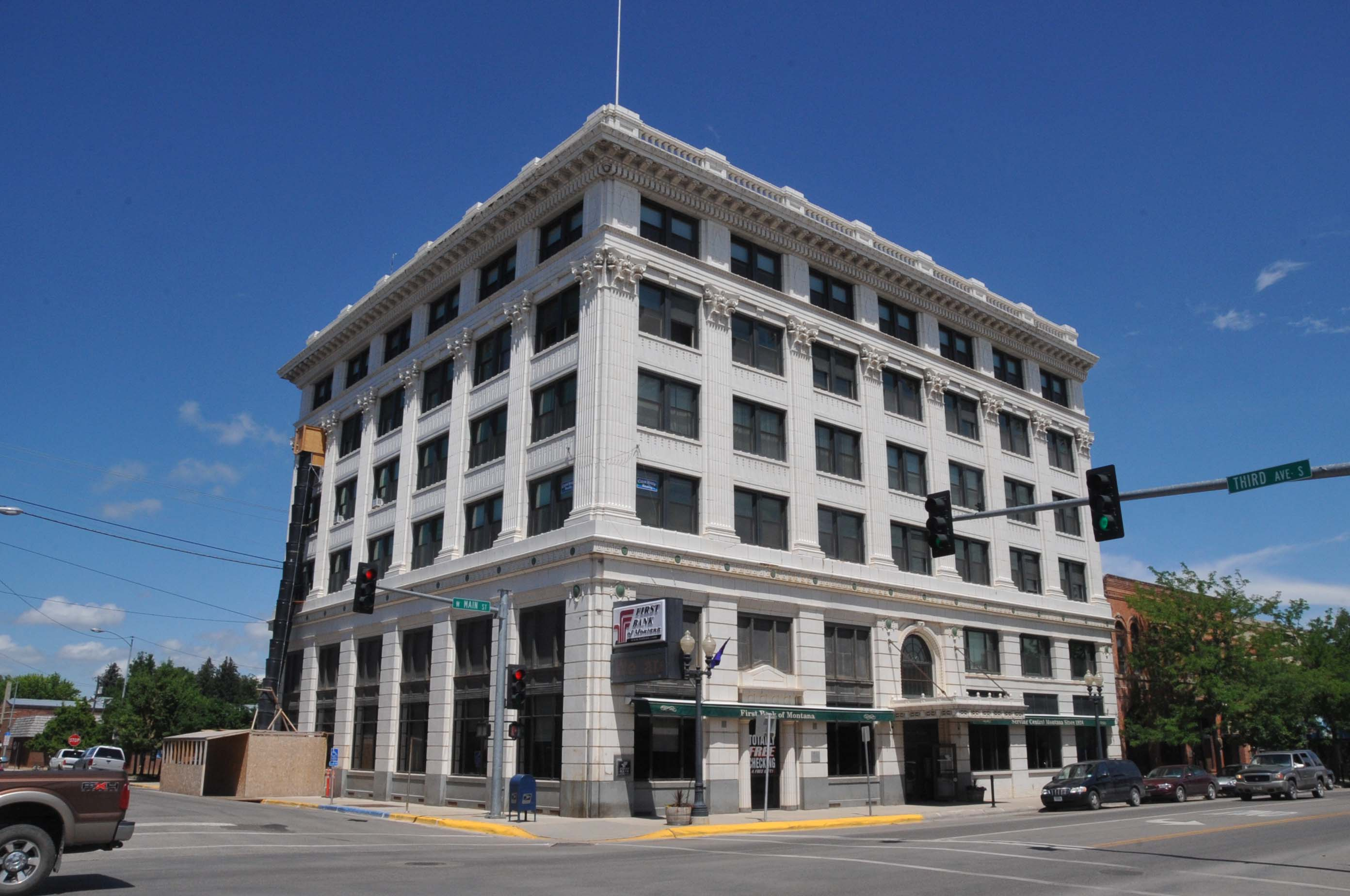

- Location within Montana Location within the United States
- Location: Roughly bounded by Washington St., 1st Ave., Janeaux St., and 8th Ave., Lewistown, Montana
- Coordinates: 47°03′53″N 109°25′44″W
- Area: 28 acres (11 ha)
- Architect: Multiple
- Architectural style: Late 19th and 20th Century Revivals, Late Victorian, Stone Craftsman
- MPS: Lewistown MRA
- NRHP reference No.: 85001405
- Added to NRHP: June 27, 1985

The Lewistown Central Business Historic District is a 28 acres (11 ha) historic district in Lewistown, Montana, which was listed on the National Register of Historic Places in 1985. The listing included 54 contributing buildings.

It includes the already-listed St. Leo's Catholic Church and the Masonic Temple.

The district is roughly bounded by Washington St., 1st Ave., Janeaux St., and 8th Ave., in Lewistown.
