= Masonic Temple (Aberdeen, South Dakota) =

- U.S. National Register of Historic Places
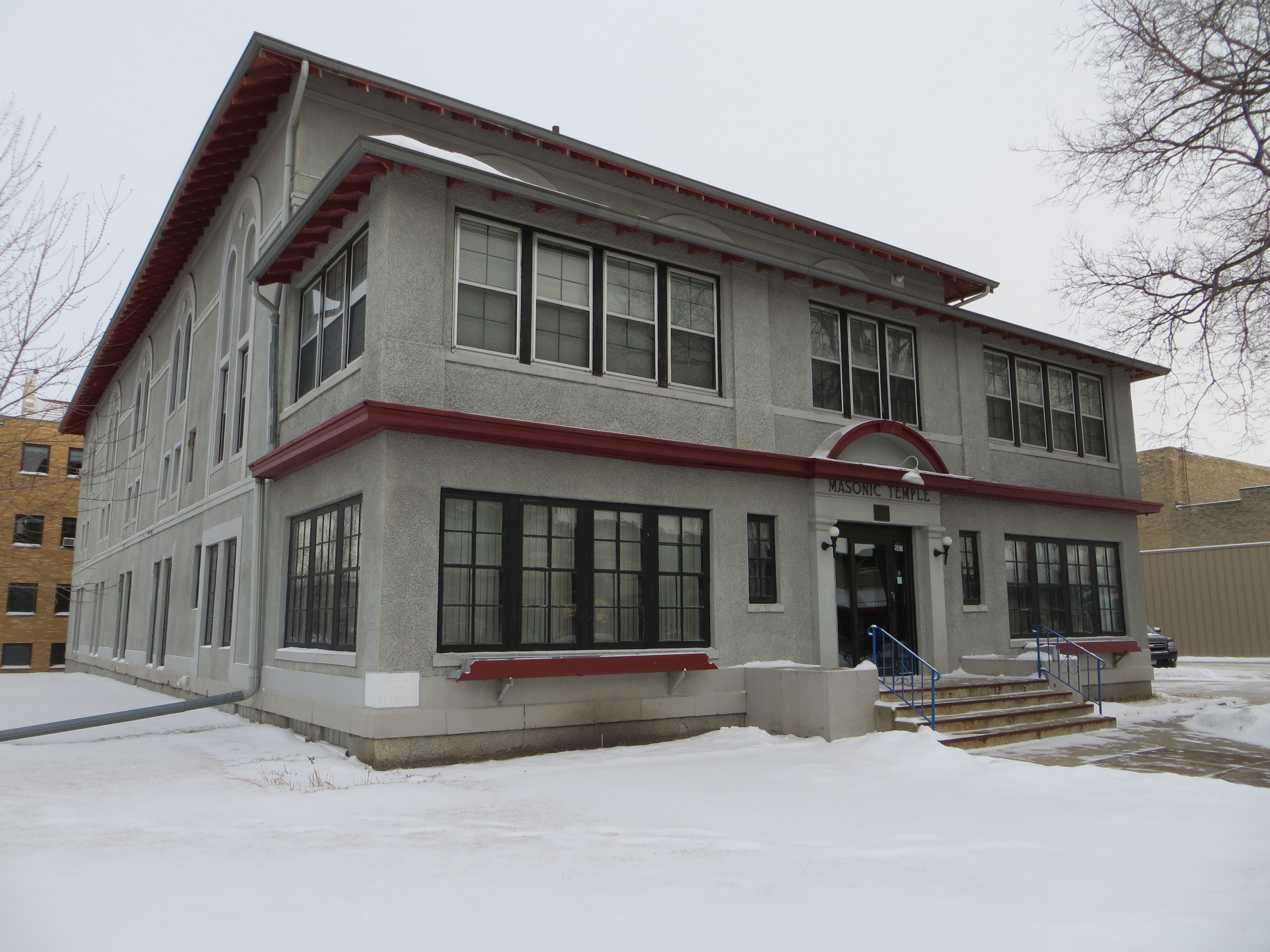
- Building in 2015

- Location within South Dakota Location within the United States
- Location: 503 S. Main St., Aberdeen, South Dakota
- Coordinates: 45°27′35″N 98°29′15″W
- Area: less than one acre
- Built: 1899
- Architectural style: Romanesque Revival; Italian Villa; Moorish
- NRHP reference No.: 80003719
- Added to NRHP: May 29, 1980

The Masonic Temple in Aberdeen, South Dakota is a building from 1899. It was listed on the National Register of Historic Places in 1980.

It is a three-story building reflecting Italian Villa, Moorish, and Romanesque Revival styles.
