= Masonic Temple (Springfield, Massachusetts) =

- U.S. National Register of Historic Places
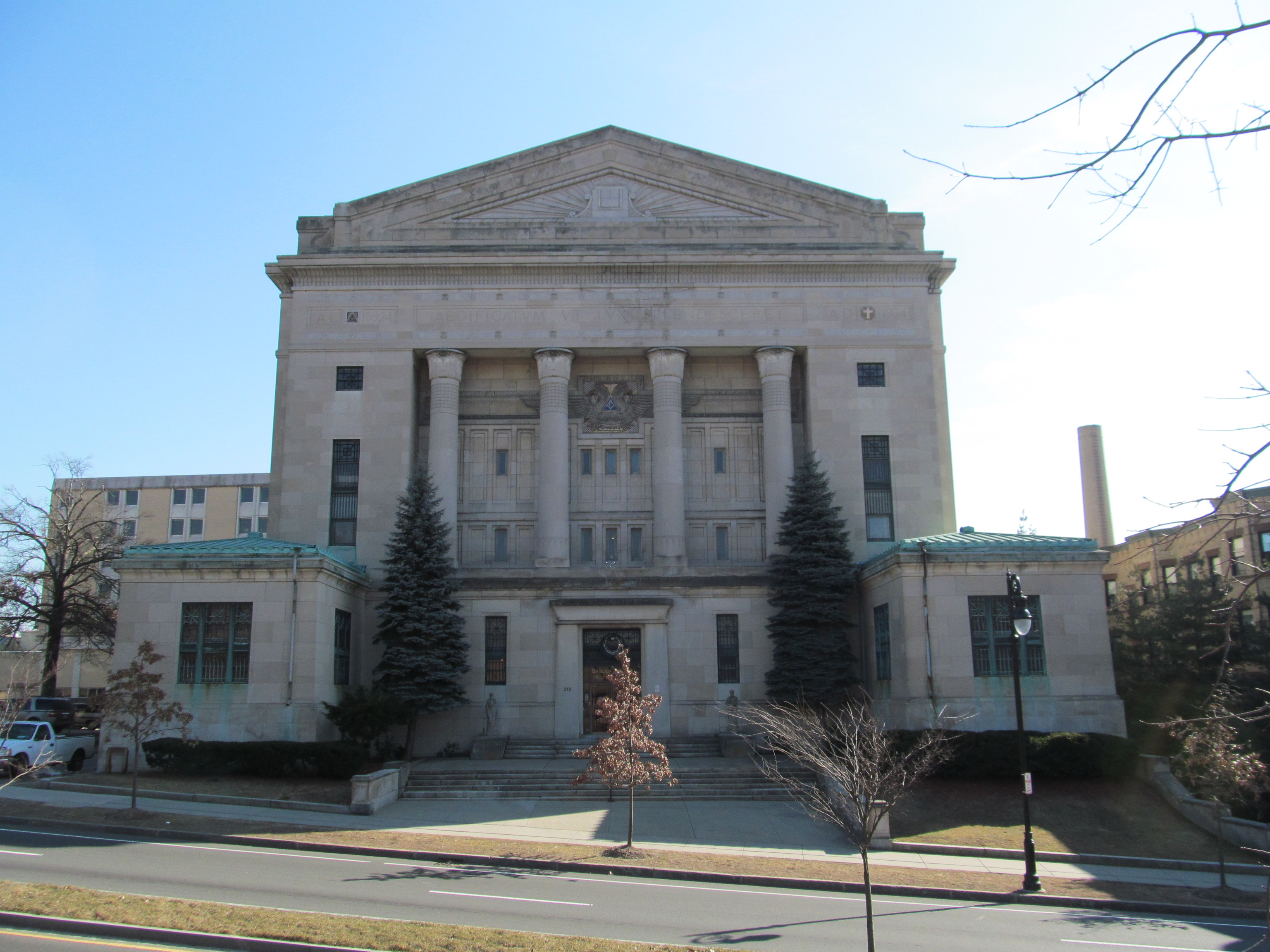

- Location within Massachusetts Location within the United States
- Location: Springfield, Massachusetts
- Coordinates: 42°6′20″N 72°34′52″W
- Built: 1923
- Built by: A. E. Stephens
- Architect: McClintock & Craig
- Architectural style: Classical Revival
- NRHP reference No.: 83003979
- Added to NRHP: November 10, 1983

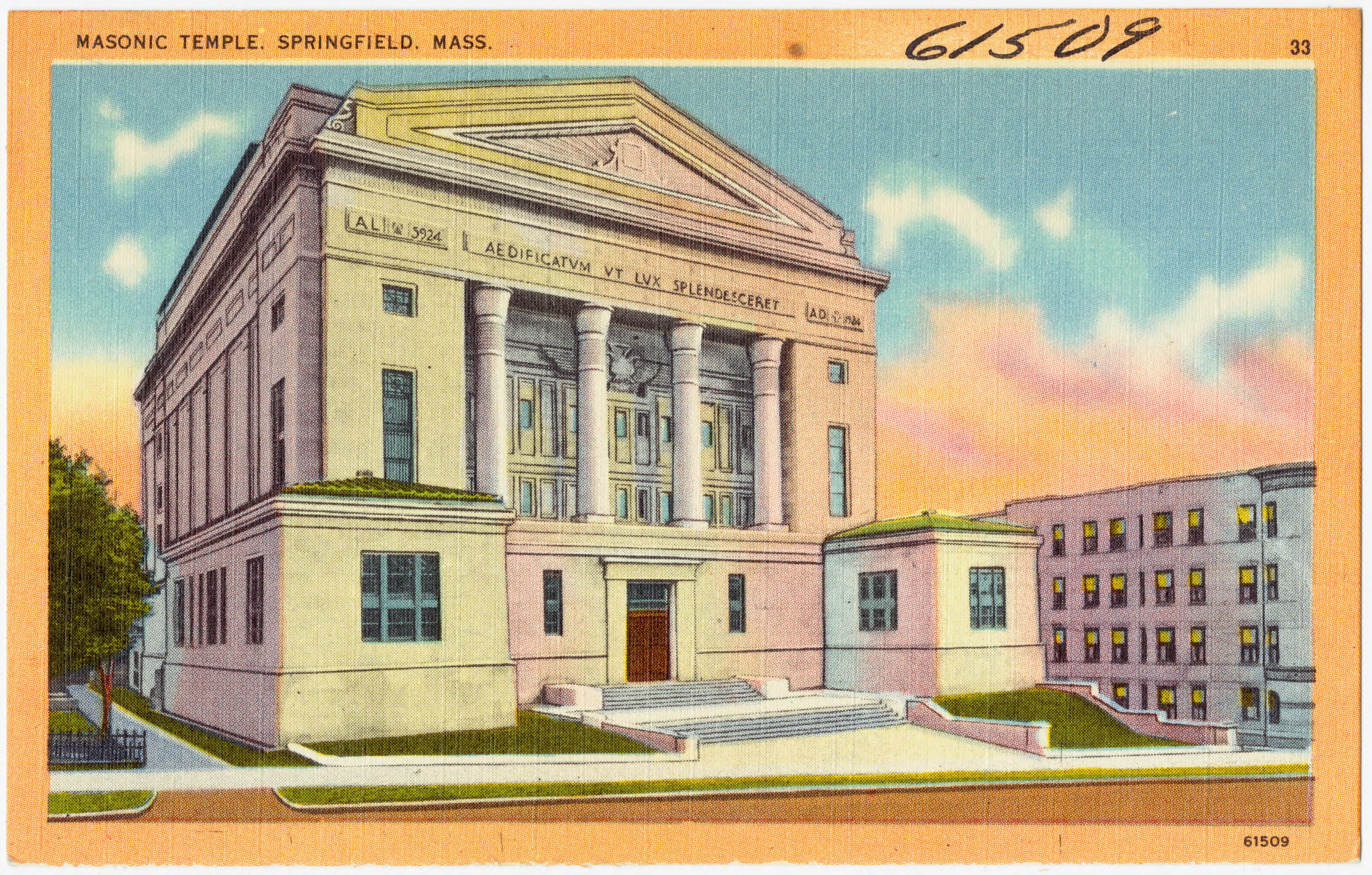
Historic postcard

The Masonic Temple is an historic former Masonic building at 339–341 State Street in Springfield, Massachusetts. The four story Neo-Classical building was built in 1923 to serve as the headquarters of the local Masonic lodge. It occupies a prominent position opposite the Springfield Armory, just outside the downtown area. The building, which is no longer owned by the Masons, was listed on the National Register of Historic Places in 1983.

The first Masonic lodge was established in Springfield in 1817. Between then and the early 1920s, Masonic organizations in the city met in a variety of places, including the town hall, and facilities in an insurance company building. The various lodges banded together to build their first dedicated space in 1893 at the corner of State and Main Streets. In the 1920s a fund drive was organized to construct a new facility. The firm of Edward McClintock and Charles Craig, both active Masons, was hired to design the building, which was built by A.E. Stephens beginning in October 1923, and formally dedicated in June 1924.

Unlike the lodge built in 1893 (in which the ground floor contained retail space), the entire building was used for lodge purposes. The main entrance opened into a two-story foyer with marble floors and staircase, and was decorated with Greek Doric columns. The first floor housed two Blue Lodge facilities, one with space for 240 people the other for 450. Each of these rooms had inlaid cork floors and limestone walls, and house a pipe organ. The balance of the first floor included a reception area, and a meeting room for the lodge trustees. A mezzanine area had an office for the blue lodge secretary and a fireproof vault.

The second floor housed a large space devoted to York Rite activities. The large space accommodated 500 people and was, like the first floor chambers, floored in inlaid cork, with limestone walls and a pipe organ. The chamber also had an arcade supported by pillars. Smaller offices and storage rooms line the remainder of this level, and there was again a mezzanine area with more storage. The third floor had the largest space in the building. With a capacity of 1,500, including 300 in a balcony, this chamber was used for Scottish Rite ceremonies, and featured a large and elaborate stage flanked by the pipes of an organ.

On November 10, 1983, the building was listed on the National Register of Historic Places. It was acquired in 2007 by the Archdiocese of New England of the International Communion of the Holy Christian Orthodox Church, which made substantial renovations, converting some of the space into an art gallery, and repurposing others for religious use. The archdiocese had financial difficulties, and the property was sold at a foreclosure auction to its mortgage holder in January 2012.

== See also ==
- National Register of Historic Places listings in Springfield, Massachusetts
- National Register of Historic Places listings in Hampden County, Massachusetts
