= Masonic Temple and Theater =

Also known as St. John's Lodge No. 3

- U.S. National Register of Historic Places
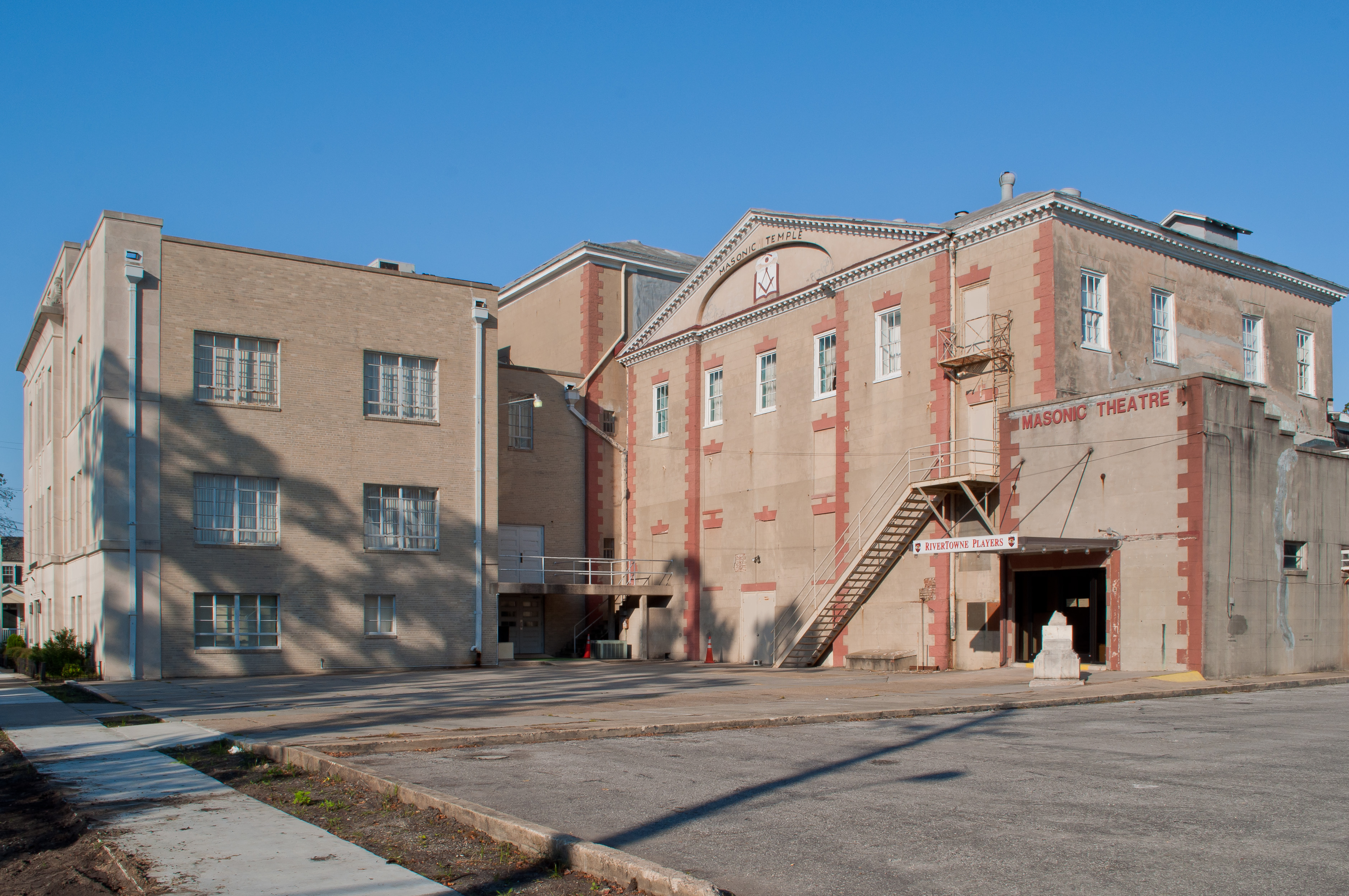
- Masonic Temple, Hancock & Johnson Streets, New Bern (Craven County, North Carolina)

- Location within North Carolina Location within the United States
- Location: 516 Hancock St., New Bern, North Carolina
- Coordinates: 35°6′39″N 77°2′25″W
- Area: 0.5 acres (0.20 ha)
- Built: 1802-1809
- Architect: Dewey, John
- Architectural style: Masonic temple
- NRHP reference No.: 72000946
- Added to NRHP: March 16, 1972

The Masonic Temple, the home of Saint John's Lodge No. 3, A.F. & A.M., is a historic Masonic temple and theatre located at 516 Hancock Street in New Bern, Craven County, North Carolina. It was built between 1802 and 1809, with additions and several alterations. The original section is a very tall, two-story Federal style brick structure, seven bays wide by four bays deep. It sits on a high basement and has a hipped roof. A major addition was made in 1904, and the building was remodeled in 1847 and in 1917. The site was the scene of a duel in 1802. The Masonic Theatre is currently the home to a local community theatre called RiverTowne Players.

It was listed on the National Register of Historic Places in 1972.
