= Masonic Lodge No. 472 =

- Masonic Lodge #472
- U.S. National Register of Historic Places
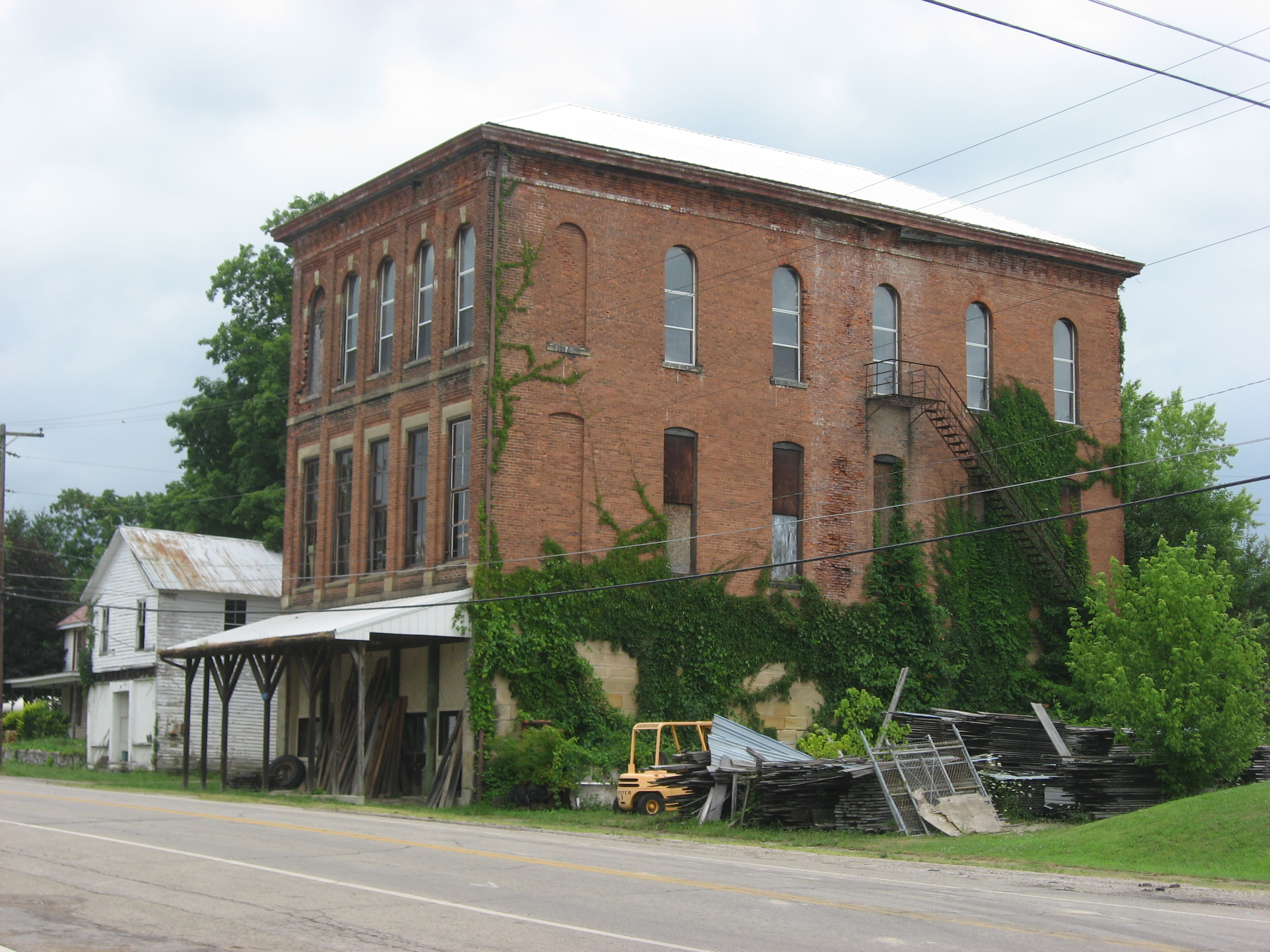
- Front and side of the lodge building

- Location within Ohio Location within the United States
- Location: 18 Commercial St., Zaleski, Ohio
- Coordinates: 39°16′56″N 82°23′37″W
- Area: less than one acre
- Built: 1884
- Architect: Stuart Company
- Architectural style: Italianate
- NRHP reference No.: 00000182
- Added to NRHP: March 9, 2000

The Masonic Lodge No. 472 is an Italianate building in Zaleski, Ohio that was built in 1884. It was listed on the National Register of Historic Places in 2000. Currently, no Masonic lodges meet in the building and there is no lodge with the number 472 active in Ohio.
