= Masonic Temple (Warrensburg, Missouri) =

- U.S. National Register of Historic Places
- Location within Missouri Location within the United States
- Location: 101-103 W. Market St., and 301-303 N. Holden St., Warrensburg, Missouri
- Coordinates: 38°45′55″N 93°44′23″W
- Area: less than one acre
- Built: c. 1893-1894
- Architect: Matthews, William S.; Saunders, Lewis L.
- Architectural style: Italianate
- NRHP reference No.: 98001544
- Added to NRHP: December 24, 1998

The Masonic Temple is a historic Masonic temple located at Warrensburg, Johnson County, Missouri. It was built in 1893–1894, and is a rectangular three-story, Italianate style red brick building with extensive sandstone trim. The building measures approximately 48 feet by 92 feet.

It was for many years the meeting hall of Corinthian Lodge # 265 (a local Masonic Lodge), but the lodge has subsequently moved to other premises. (Note: This website proves nothing: Grand Lodge of Missouri, Lodges & Districts.)

It was listed on the National Register of Historic Places in 1998.
