= Masonic Temple (Port Angeles, Washington) =

- U.S. National Register of Historic Places
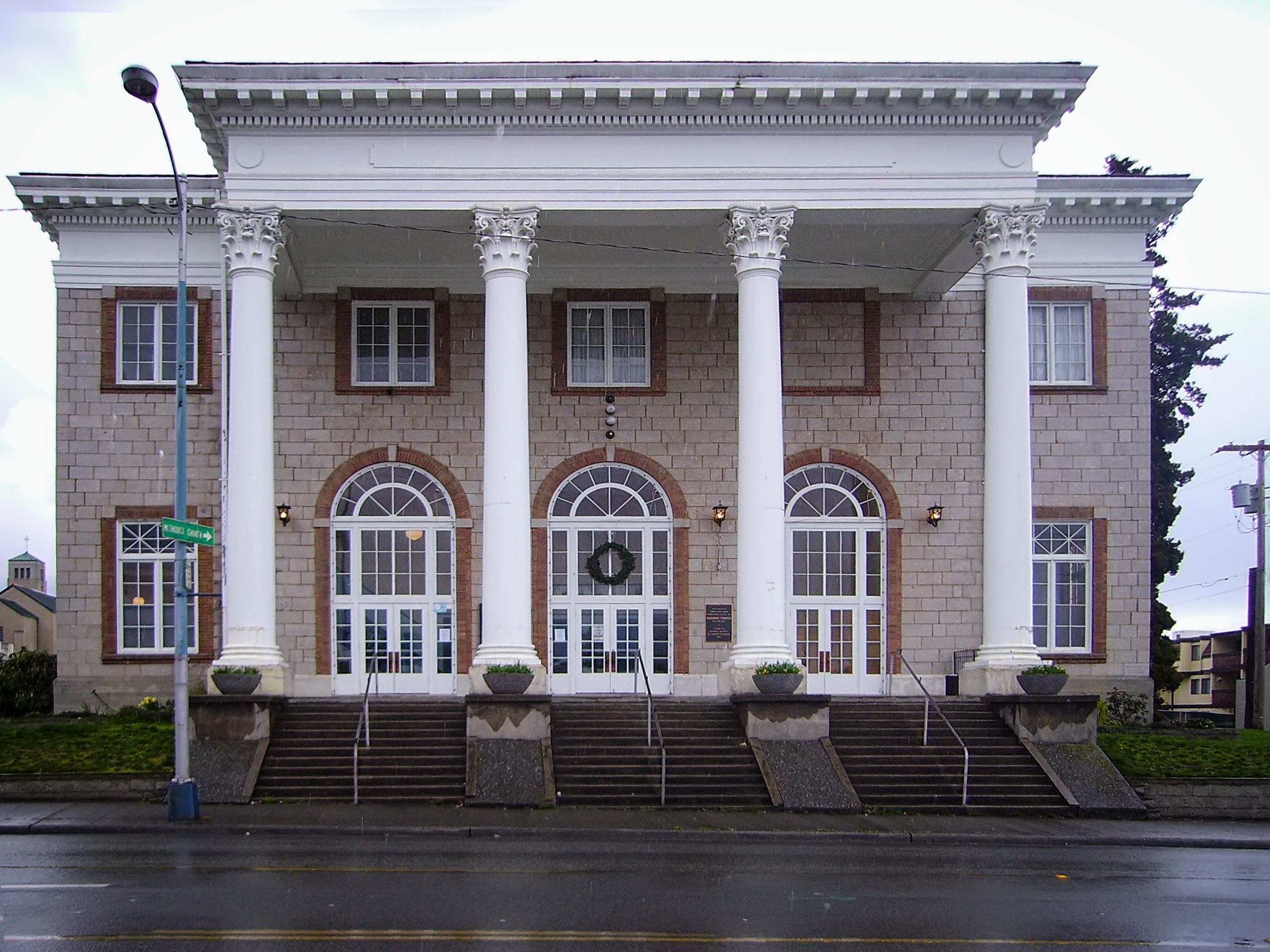

- Location within Washington (state)
- Location: 622 South Lincoln Street, Port Angeles, Washington
- Coordinates: 48°06′49″N 123°26′12″W
- Area: less than one acre
- Built: 1921
- Architect: Earl A. Roberts
- Architectural style: Classical Revival
- NRHP reference No.: 89000400
- Added to NRHP: May 11, 1989

The Masonic Temple at 622 South Lincoln Street in Port Angeles, Washington is a historic masonic temple that was constructed in 1921 in Classical Revival style. Throughout the early 20th century, its members included some of the city's most prominent citizens. The building also served as the primary venue in Port Angeles for large social and civic gatherings. It continues to function as a Masonic Lodge today and hosts numerous other events.

It was added to the National Register of Historic Places in 1989.
