= Masonic Temple (Kingman, Arizona) =

- U.S. National Register of Historic Places
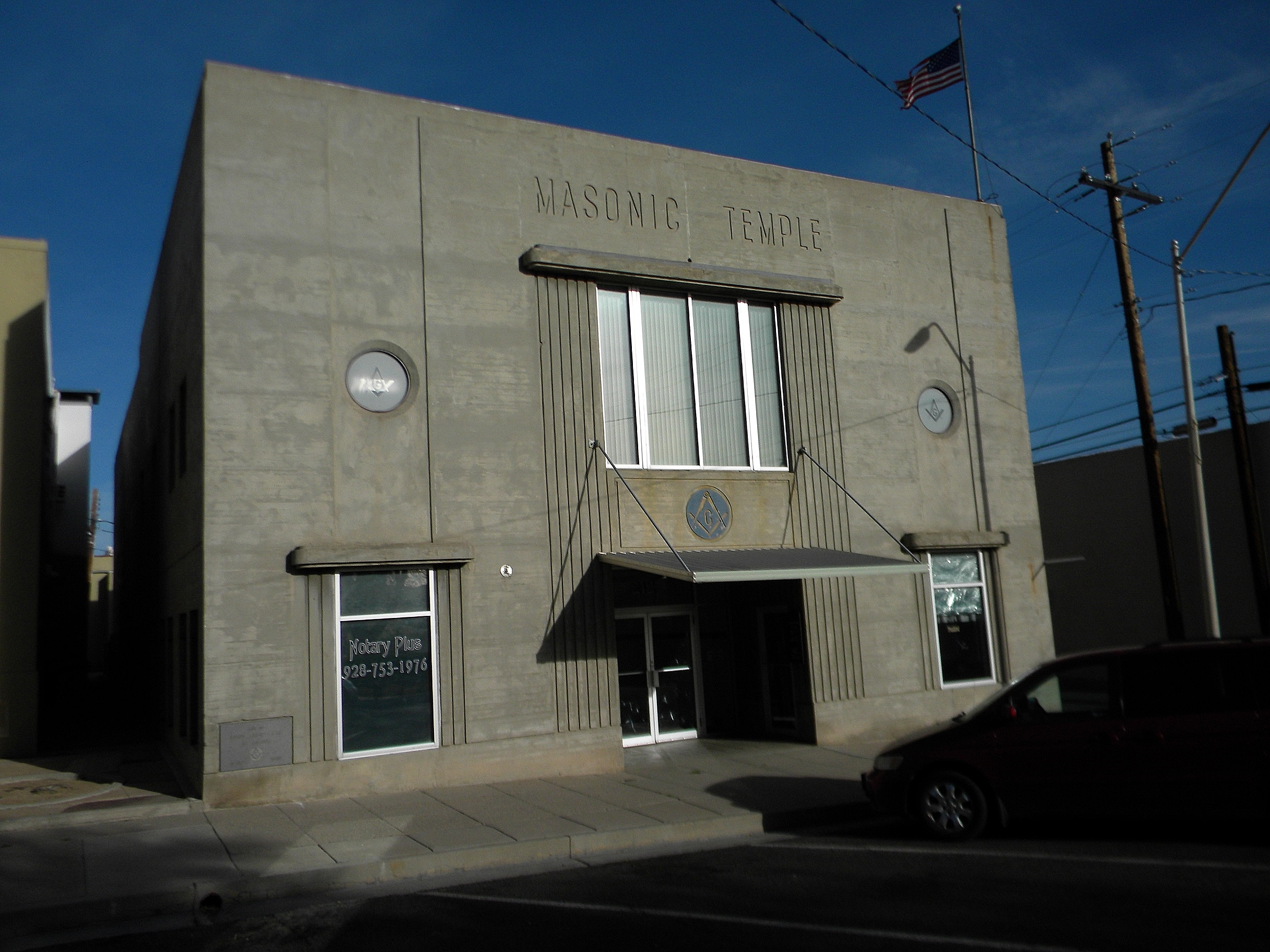

- Location within Arizona Location within the United States
- Location: 212 N. Fourth St., Kingman, Arizona
- Coordinates: 35°11′24″N 114°3′7″W
- Built: 1939
- Architectural style: Moderne
- MPS: Kingman MRA
- NRHP reference No.: 86001164
- Added to NRHP: May 19, 1986

The Masonic Temple is a historic building located in Kingman, Arizona. The temple was built in 1939 for Kingman Masonic Lodge No. 22. Designed in the Moderne style and the second of two WPA Projects in Kingman. It is situated next door to the old post office.

Before 1939, Kingman Lodge No. 22 met in the Odd Fellows meeting hall. As both fraternal organizations grew, the Masons decided that they needed their own building. Today, the lower level of the temple is used for office space for downtown area of Kingman. Kingman Masonic Lodge and The Order of Eastern Star continue to meet on the upper floor of the Temple. The temple is listed on the National Register of Historic Places.
