= Masonic Temple (Lewistown, Montana) =

- U.S. National Register of Historic Places
- U.S. Historic district – Contributing property
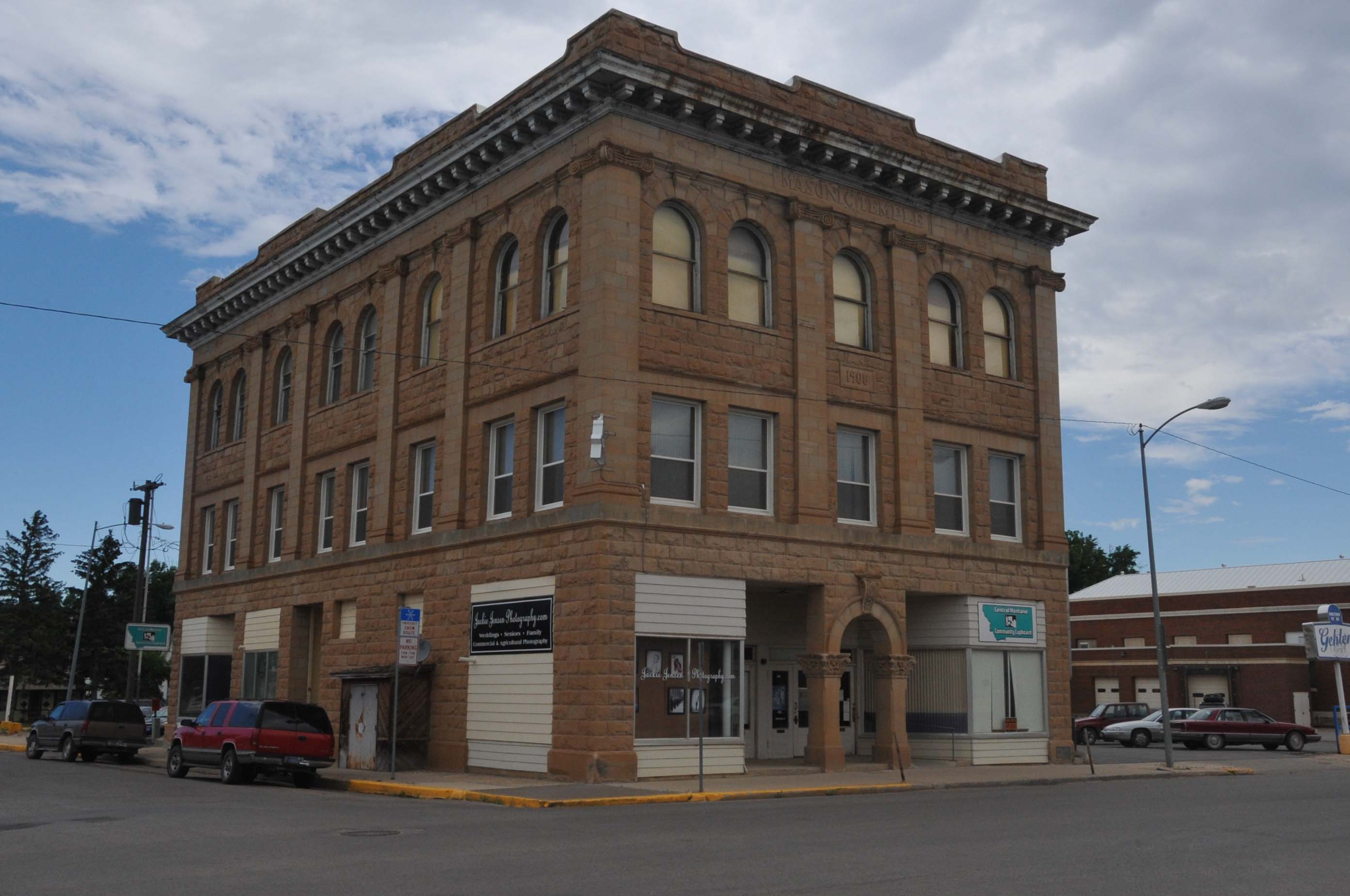

- Location within Montana Location within the United States
- Location: 322 W. Broadway St., Lewistown, Montana
- Coordinates: 47°3′55″N 109°25′40″W
- Area: 0.1 acres (0.040 ha)
- Built: 1908
- Built by: Tuss, Peter
- Architect: Wasmansdorf & Eastman
- Architectural style: Classical Revival, Romanesque
- Part of: Central Business Historic District (ID85001405)
- NRHP reference No.: 79001401

Significant dates
- Added to NRHP: July 3, 1979
- Designated CP: June 27, 1985

The Masonic Temple in Lewistown, Montana, also known as the Lewistown Lodge No. 37 A.F. & A.M., is a building from 1908. It was listed on the National Register of Historic Places in 1979.

It is a standalone three-story building, with basement, at the corner of Fourth Avenue North and West Broadway Street in Lewistown. Up to the ceremonial placement of the building's cornerstone on August 20, 1908, almost all of the stonecutters, masons, and others involved with its construction had come from the nation of Croatia, including Peter Tuss, the stonemason who was the contractor for the building's construction.
