= Masonic Temple (Huntington, West Virginia) =

- Masonic Temple-Watts, Ritter, Wholesale Drygoods Company Building
- U.S. National Register of Historic Places
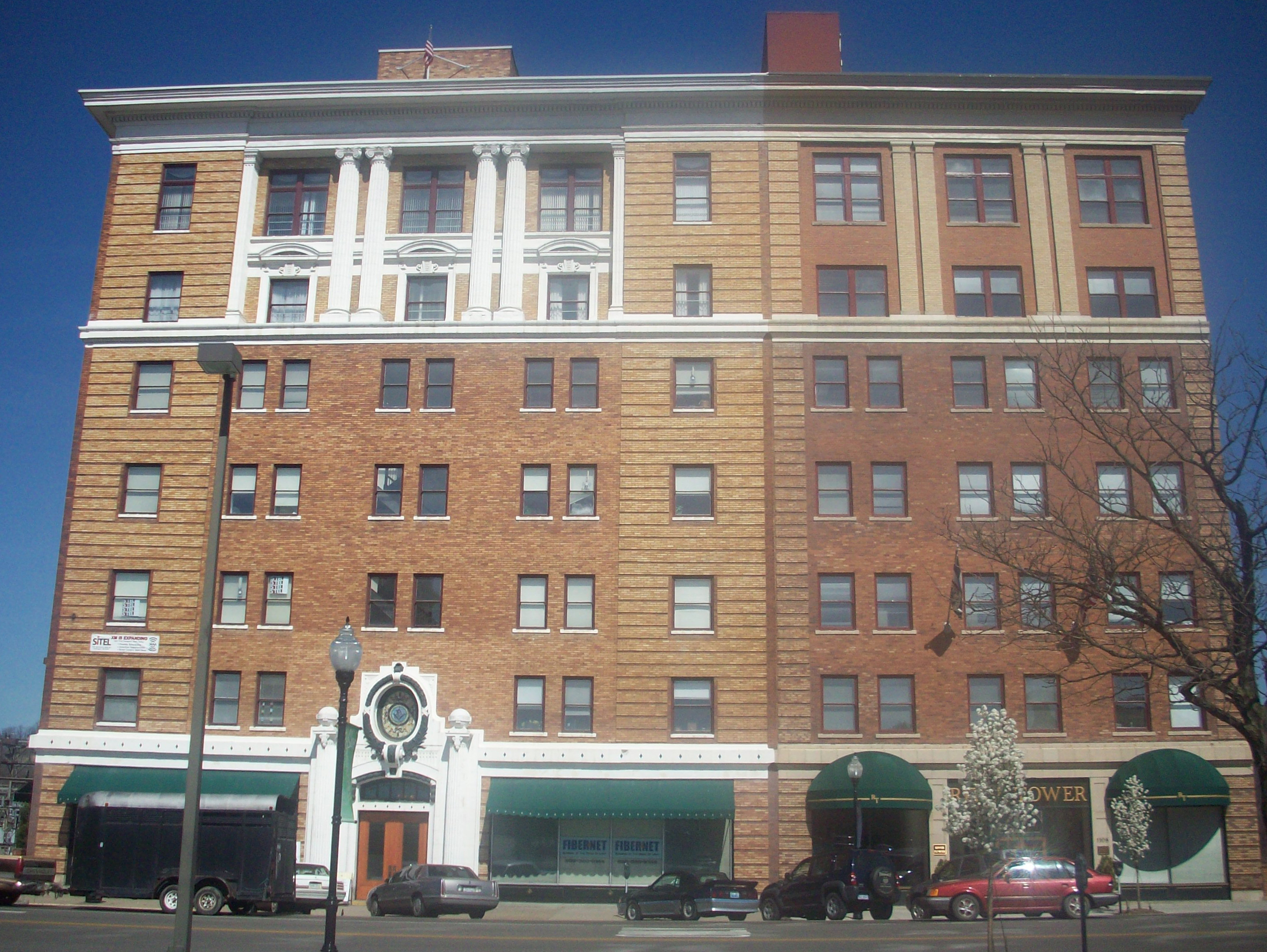

- Location within West Virginia Location within the United States
- Location: 1108 Third Avenue, Huntington, West Virginia
- Coordinates: 38.4229°N 82.4405°W
- Area: less than one acre
- Built: 1922
- Built by: Moore Construction Co.
- Architect: Mills, Wilbur T.
- Architectural style: Early Commercial
- NRHP reference No.: 93000614
- Added to NRHP: August 26, 1993

The Masonic Temple—Watts, Ritter, Wholesale Drygoods Company Building in Huntington, West Virginia, which has also been historically known as Watts, Ritter Wholesale Drygoods Company Building and more recently known as River Tower, is a commercial building. It is located at 1108 Third Avenue, in Huntington, Cabell County, West Virginia. It was built between 1914 and 1922 as a five-story brick building.

The building is constructed of steel-reinforced concrete with yellow and orange brick facing and terra cotta trim, with an additional two stories added in 1926. It originally housed a large wholesale business with a retail store on the first floor. The Watts, Ritter Wholesale Drygoods Company occupied the building until the firm's closing in 1959.

The building was listed in 1993 on the National Register of Historic Places as "Masonic Temple--Watts, Ritter, Wholesale Drygoods Company Building".

== See also ==
- National Register of Historic Places listings in Cabell County, West Virginia
