= Masonic Block (Reading, Massachusetts) =

- U.S. National Register of Historic Places
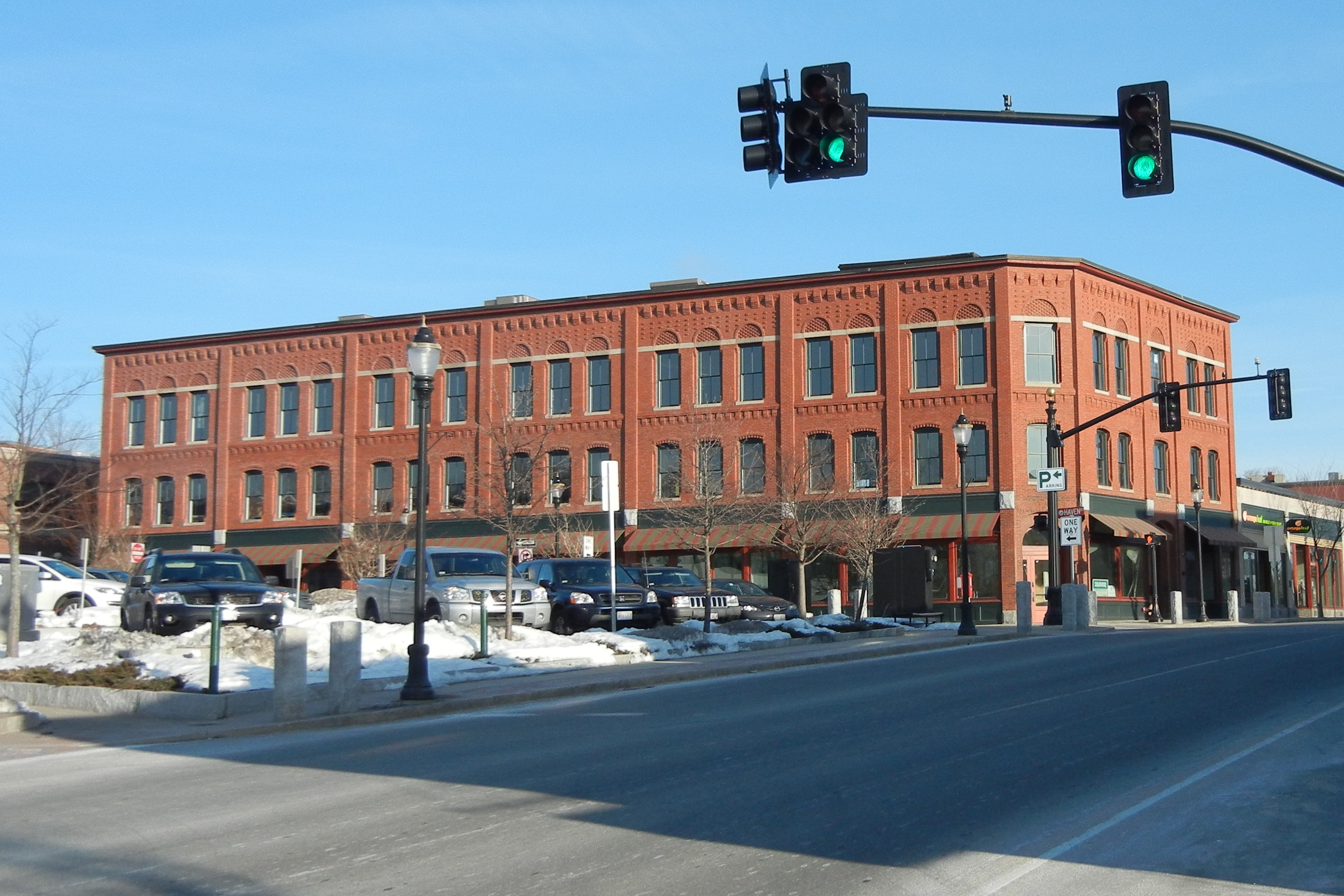
- Masonic Block

- Location within Massachusetts Location within the United States
- Location: 600–622 Main Street, Reading, Massachusetts
- Coordinates: 42°31′25.39″N 71°6′10.81″W
- Architectural style: Late 19th And 20th Century Revivals
- MPS: Reading MRA
- NRHP reference No.: 84002746
- Added to NRHP: September 19, 1984

The Masonic Block (also known as the M.F. Charles Building) is an historic commercial block in Reading, Massachusetts. This three-story brick building is distinctive in the town for its Renaissance Revival styling. It was built in 1894 by the local Reading Masonic Temple Corporation, and housed the local Masonic lodge on the third floor. The building was listed on the National Register of Historic Places in 1984.

== Description and history ==
The Masonic Block is set at the northwest corner of Main Street (Massachusetts Route 28) and Haven Street in Reading's central business district. It is a three-story brick structure with stone trim. The facade facing Main Street is five bays wide, that facing Haven is nineteen bays, and there is a bay in an angled corner between. The first level houses modern commercial storefronts, with plate glass windows sheltered by awnings. The upper floor bays are all sash windows, and are divided into groups of varying size by projecting piers that rise to the roof. A band of corbelled brickwork separates the second and third levels, and the third level is topped by a band of limestone, above which is a row of blind arches, giving the third-floor windows the appearance of being set in arched openings. This row of arches is separated from the roof by a band of more heavily corbelled brickwork.

The block was built in 1894, displacing a private residence that was disassembled and relocated. At the time, the lane to the south was private; it was widened and named Haven Street in honor of the first minister of the Third Parish, Thomas Haven. It was built by the Reading Masonic Temple Corporation, a private stock company composed of local businessmen. Longtime tenants of the building included Willis' Drug Store, the Reading Chronicle (publisher 1894-1932), and the local Masonic lodge, which occupied the third floor. The building was extended to the north in 1929, a space that was occupied by jeweler Millard F. Charles. Charles over time acquired a controlling interest in the ownership corporation, which was renamed the Millard F. Charles Corporation in 1972.

== See also ==
- National Register of Historic Places listings in Reading, Massachusetts
- National Register of Historic Places listings in Middlesex County, Massachusetts
