= Masonic Temple (Yakima, Washington) =

- U.S. National Register of Historic Places
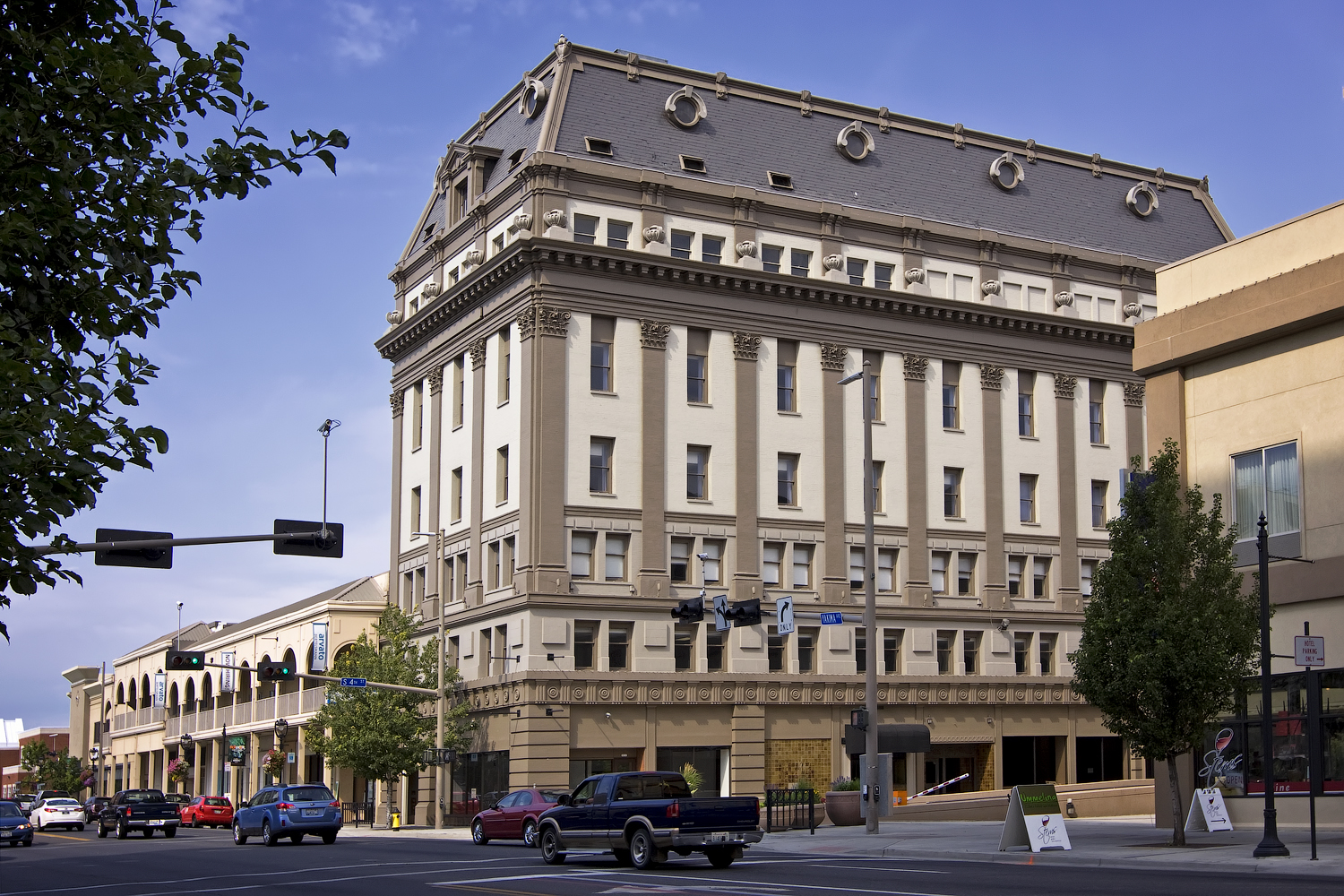

- Location within Washington (state)
- Location: 321 E. Yakima Ave., Yakima, Washington
- Coordinates: 46°36′13″N 120°30′2″W
- Area: 0 acres (0 ha)
- Built: 1911
- Architect: Frederick Heath; Bowles, R.J., et al; Deveaux, W.W., et al.
- Architectural style: Second Empire
- NRHP reference No.: 96000051
- Added to NRHP: February 16, 1996

The Masonic Temple in Yakima, Washington, is a historic building constructed in 1911. Designed in 1909 by prominent Tacoma architect Frederick Heath in collaboration with Yakima architect William W. DeVeaux, while French Second-empire in design on the exterior, the lodge's interiors were designed based on contemporary knowledge of King Solomon's Temple at Jerusalem and would incorporate stone from what was believed to be the same quarry used by Solomon. One of Yakima's largest building projects of the era, construction of the concrete and steel-frame skyscraper would last over a year from late 1910 to early 1912. It was listed on the National Register of Historic Places in 1996. For many years it served as a meeting hall for Yakima's Masonic Lodges, however no lodges meet in the building today.
