= Masonic Temple (Windsor, Ontario) =

- Interactive map of the Masonic Temple area

General information
- Architectural style: Neo-Classical Revival
- Location: 986 Ouellette Avenue; Windsor, Ontario; N9A 1C6
- Coordinates: 42.30946°N 83.03327°W
- Opened: January 1, 1922
- Owner: Border Masonic Temple Association

Technical details
- Floor count: 3

Design and construction
- Architect: James Carlisle Pennington

Website
- www.masonictempleballroom.com

The Masonic Temple is a three-story ballroom building located at 986 Ouellette Avenue in Windsor, Ontario, Canada. It was designed by James Carlisle Pennington in a Neo-Classical Revival style and was given heritage designation by the City of Windsor in 1994.

The building serves as a home to various masonic organizations as well as a ballroom. As well, it hosts the Windsor Scottish Rite Learning Center which provides tutoring to individuals with dyslexia.
