= Masonic Temple (Casper, Wyoming) =

- U.S. National Register of Historic Places
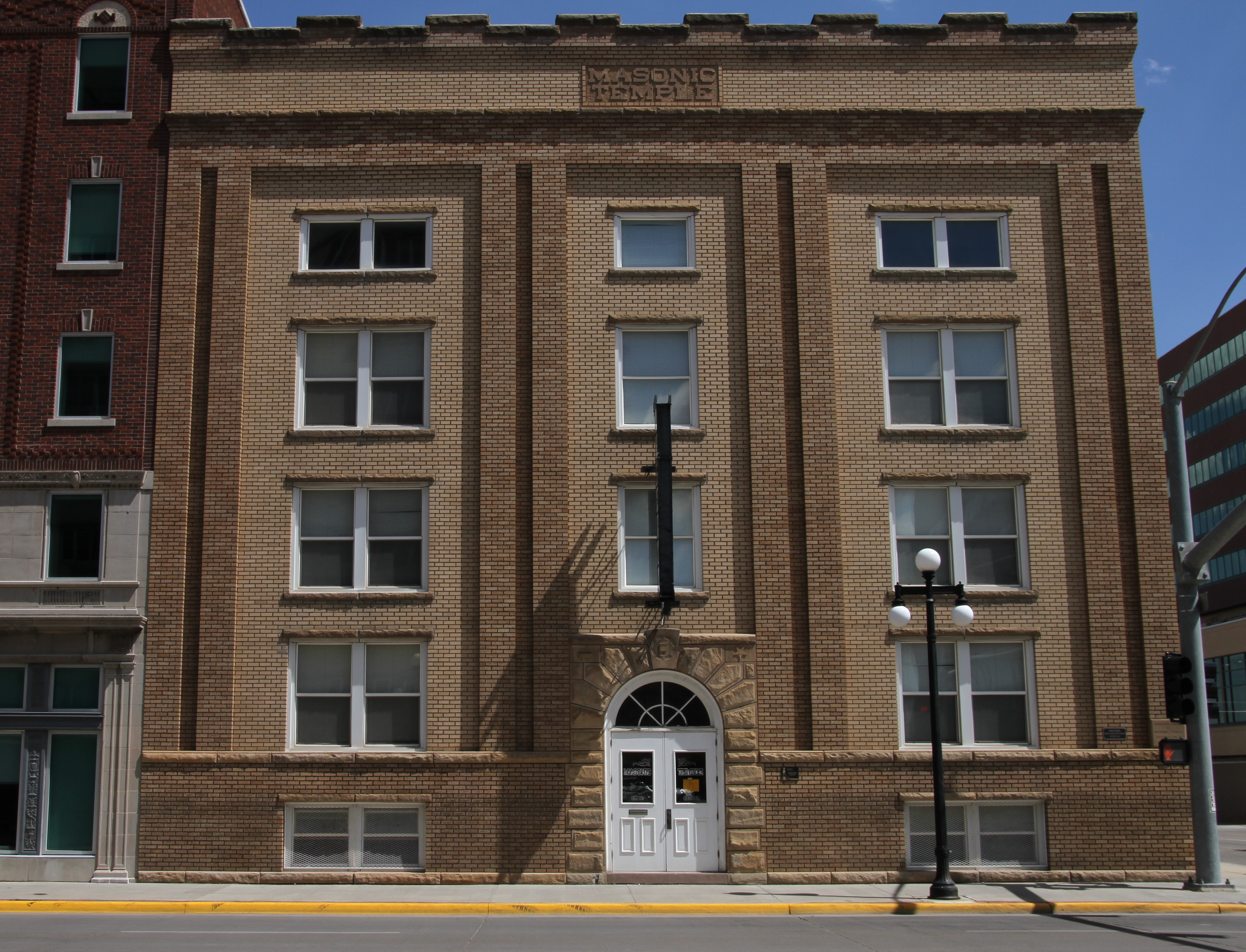
- The front of the building in 2017

- Location within Wyoming Location within the United States
- Location: 105 N. Center St., Casper, Wyoming
- Coordinates: 42°51′1″N 106°19′27″W
- Built: 1914
- Architect: Shaffer, Homer F.; Ukensky, Gus A.,
- Architectural style: Late 19th And Early 20th Century American Movements, Early Commercial
- NRHP reference No.: 05000926
- Added to NRHP: August 24, 2005

The Masonic Temple in downtown Casper, Wyoming is a Masonic hall, built in 1914 during a boom time initiated by the development of the Salt Creek Oil Field. Located on a corner site, the temple remains essentially as it was designed by Casper architect Homer F. Shaffer. The four story light-colored brick building rests on a raised basement and is topped by a crenelated parapet. The original windows have been replaced with vinyl units but retain the one-over-one appearance of the originals. Windows extend over the west and south sides. The north side is blank, while the east side is the building's rear facade and has fire escapes and a few windows.

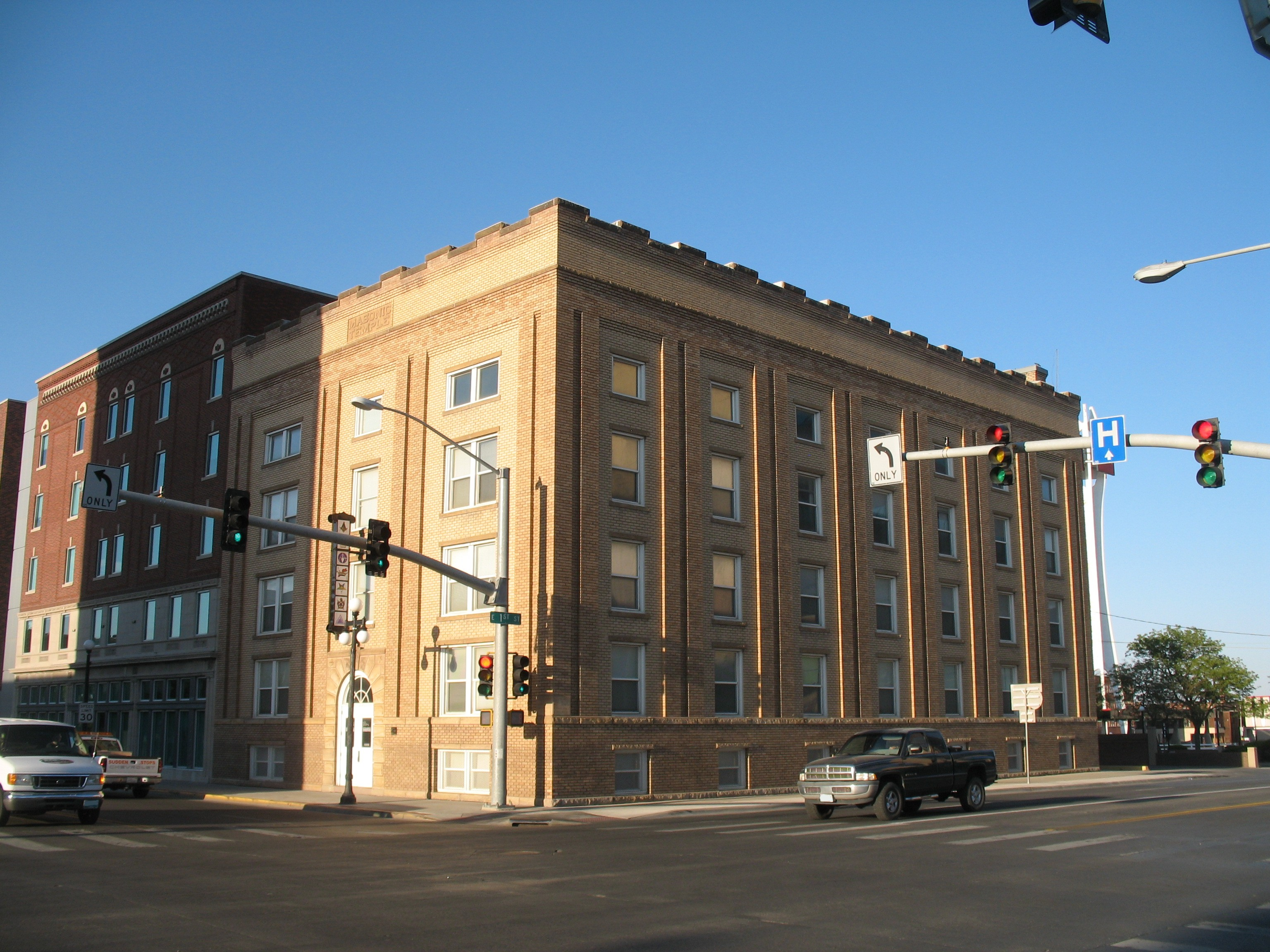
The building from the southeast in 2012

The interior is arranged, from the bottom up, as basement, a first floor, containing the ballroom, the second floor containing the lodge and banquet rooms, and a second floor balcony. The basement contains a card room and once had a two-lane bowling alley. A now-unused caretaker's apartment is on this level. A boiler room, dining room and kitchen are also found on this level. A half-story up, the main entrance opens into a vestibule with stairs descending to the basement and ascending to the first floor. A ballroom originally occupied most of the first floor, but was converted to a lodge room in 1964. A small orchestra stage was enclosed. Men's and ladies' lounges or card rooms are also on this level. The second floor contains another lodge room, a banquet hall and a kitchen. The rooms on this level have high ceilings. A balcony overlooks the lodge room.

The estimated cost of the temple was $40,000. It was built by local contractor G.A. Ukensky. The ballroom and banquet hall were rented for public gatherings. By 1924 the lodge membership was 533. Homer Schaffer, the architect, practiced as an architect for only a few years between 1912 and 1915. He later became involved in furniture sales before moving to Cheyenne and becoming a car salesman after 1926. In 1931 he and his family moved to Alamosa, Colorado where he operated an electrical contracting business, designing buildings from time to time.

== See also ==
- Townsend Hotel next door, also on the National Register
