= Masonic Temple (Rock Springs, Wyoming) =

Coordinates: 41°35′5″N 109°13′14″W

- Rock Springs Masonic Temple
- U.S. Historic district – Contributing property
- Location: Rock Springs, Wyoming, United States
- Built: 1912

The Rock Springs Masonic Temple is a historic site in Rock Springs, Wyoming, United States. It is located at 218 B Street in Rock Springs, Wyoming, United States. It is a contributing property in the Downtown Rock Springs Historic District, which was added to the National Register of Historic Places on January 19, 1994.

== History of Rock Springs Masonic Temple ==
Rock Springs Lodge 12, AF&AM, was chartered on December 3, 1889, by the Grand Lodge of Wyoming. This lodge of Masons initially met in the W. H. Mellor Building at 318 South Front Street, in Rock Springs, Wyoming. In 1911 a site was obtained for a new Masonic Temple. Bonds were sold in the amount of $25,000, and work on the building was started. The Temple was finished in late 1912, and the first meeting of Rock Springs Lodge 12 in their new building was in January 1913.

In 1947 a fire occurred in the Temple. The damage totaled about $6,000, the entire amount being covered by insurance.

== See also ==
- List of National Historic Landmarks in Wyoming
- National Register of Historic Places listings in Wyoming
