= Masonic Temple (Victoria, British Columbia) =

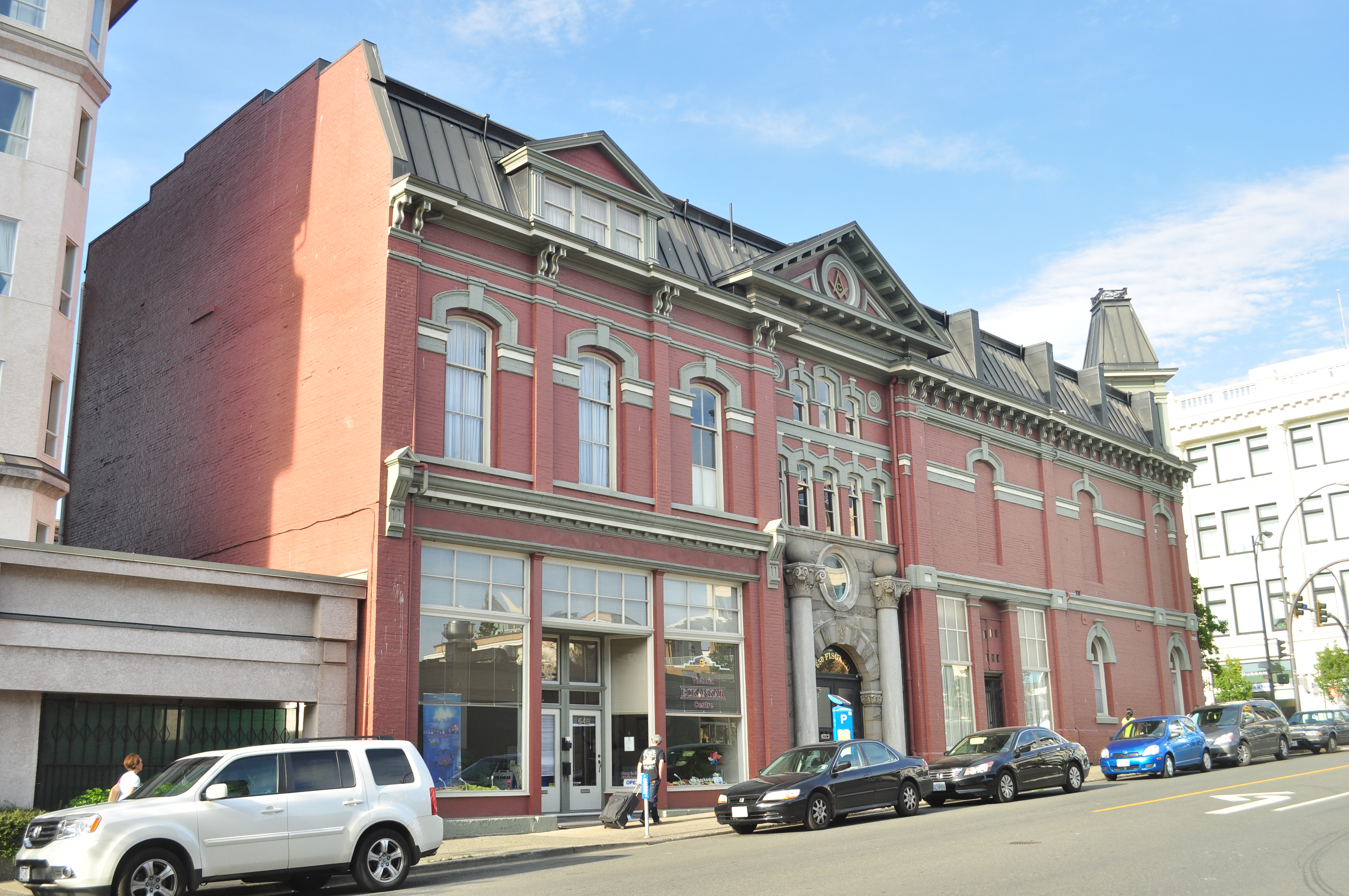
- The building's exterior in 2015
- Interactive map of the Masonic Temple area

General information
- Location: 646-654 Fisgard Street, Victoria, British Columbia, Canada
- Coordinates: 48.4296°N 123.3649°W

The Masonic Template is an historic building in Victoria, British Columbia, Canada.

== See also ==
- List of historic places in Victoria, British Columbia
