= Temple Theater =

Temple Theater or Temple Theatre may refer to:

- Temple Theater (Meridian, Mississippi), listed on the National Register of Historic Places (NRHP) in Mississippi
- Temple Theatre (Sanford, North Carolina), listed on the NRHP in North Carolina
- Temple Theatre (Saginaw, Michigan)
- Temple Theatre in Brantford, Ontario, now known as The Sanderson Centre
- Masonic Temple Theater, Mount Pleasant, Iowa, listed on the NRHP in Henry County, Iowa
- Masonic Temple Building-Temple Theater, Tacoma, Washington, listed on the NRHP in Washington
