= Masonic Building (Fort Benton, Montana) =

- U.S. National Register of Historic Places
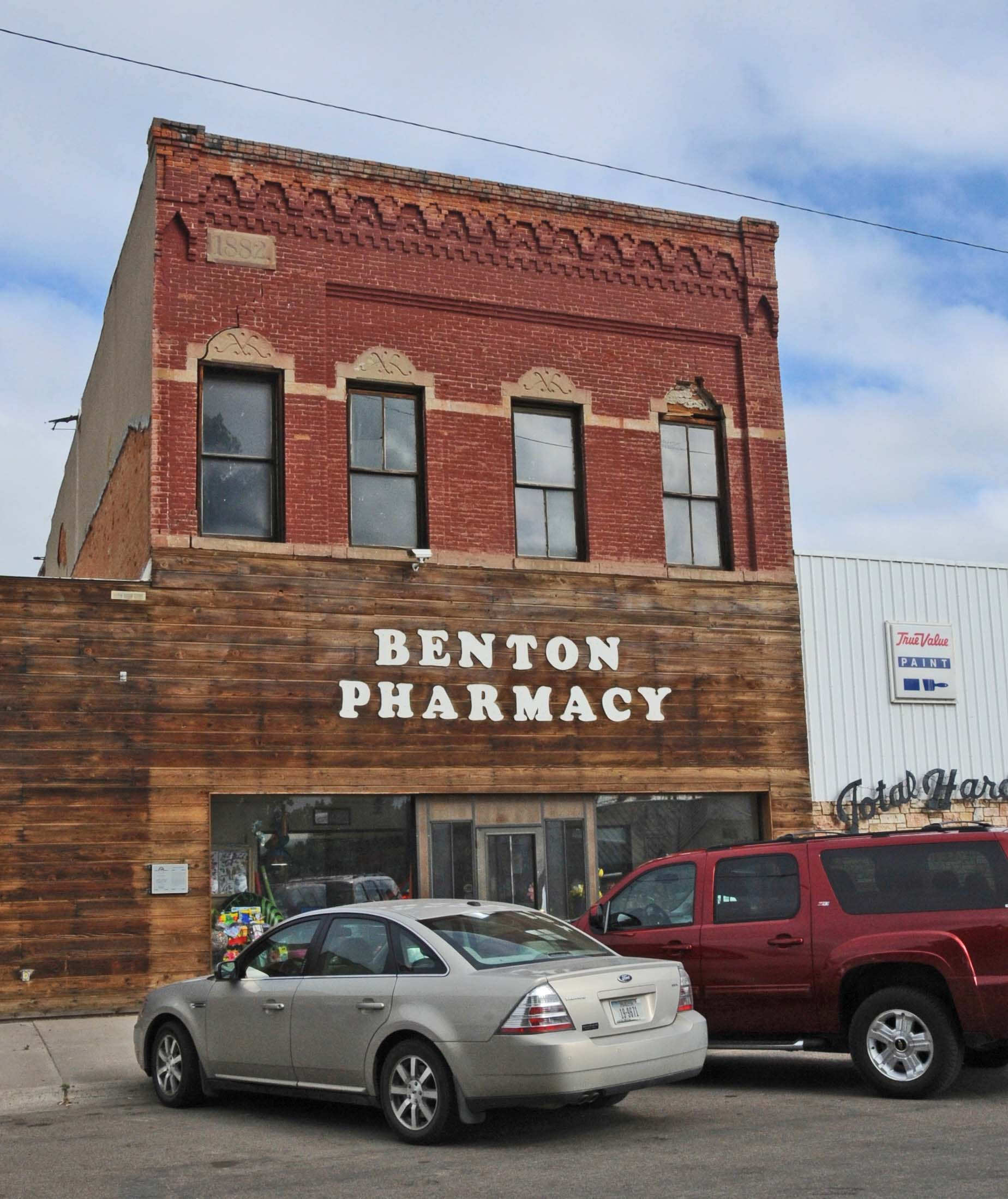

- Location within Montana Location within the United States
- Location: 1418 Front St., Fort Benton, Montana
- Coordinates: 47°49′3″N 110°39′41″W
- Area: 0.2 acres (0.081 ha)
- Built: 1882
- Architect: Wilton, John H.; Combs, Frank
- NRHP reference No.: 80002408
- Added to NRHP: October 14, 1980

The Masonic Building in Fort Benton, Montana, also known as Sharps Store or Benton Pharmacy, was built in 1882. It was listed on the National Register of Historic Places in 1980.

It is a two-story 30 by 100 feet (9.1 m × 30.5 m) brick building, built for the Masonic Lodge which had been chartered in 1880. It was built at cost of $16,000, with about $6,000 of that borrowed. Sale of the building was forced after the Masons could not make their payment on the borrowed funds in c.1887. The Masonic Lodge continued to rent the second floor until 1901.

The building was for a time the meeting hall for Benton Lodge #25, but the lodge now meets elsewhere
