= Masonic Building =

Masonic Building may refer to:

In the United States:

- Mechanics Building/Masonic Building, Pueblo, Colorado, listed on the National Register of Historic Places (NRHP) in Pueblo County
- Masonic Building (Osceola, Iowa), NRHP-listed
- Masonic Building (Alexandria, Louisiana), listed on the NRHP in Rapides Parish
- Masonic Building (Newton, Massachusetts), in Middlesex County
- Masonic Building (Billings, Montana)
- Masonic Building (Fort Benton, Montana), listed on the NRHP in Chouteau County
- Masonic Building (Kerrville, Texas), listed on the NRHP in Kerr County, Texas

== See also ==
- Masonic Temple (disambiguation)
- Masonic Lodge (disambiguation)
- List of Masonic buildings
