= Masonic Temple (Worcester, Massachusetts) =

- U.S. National Register of Historic Places
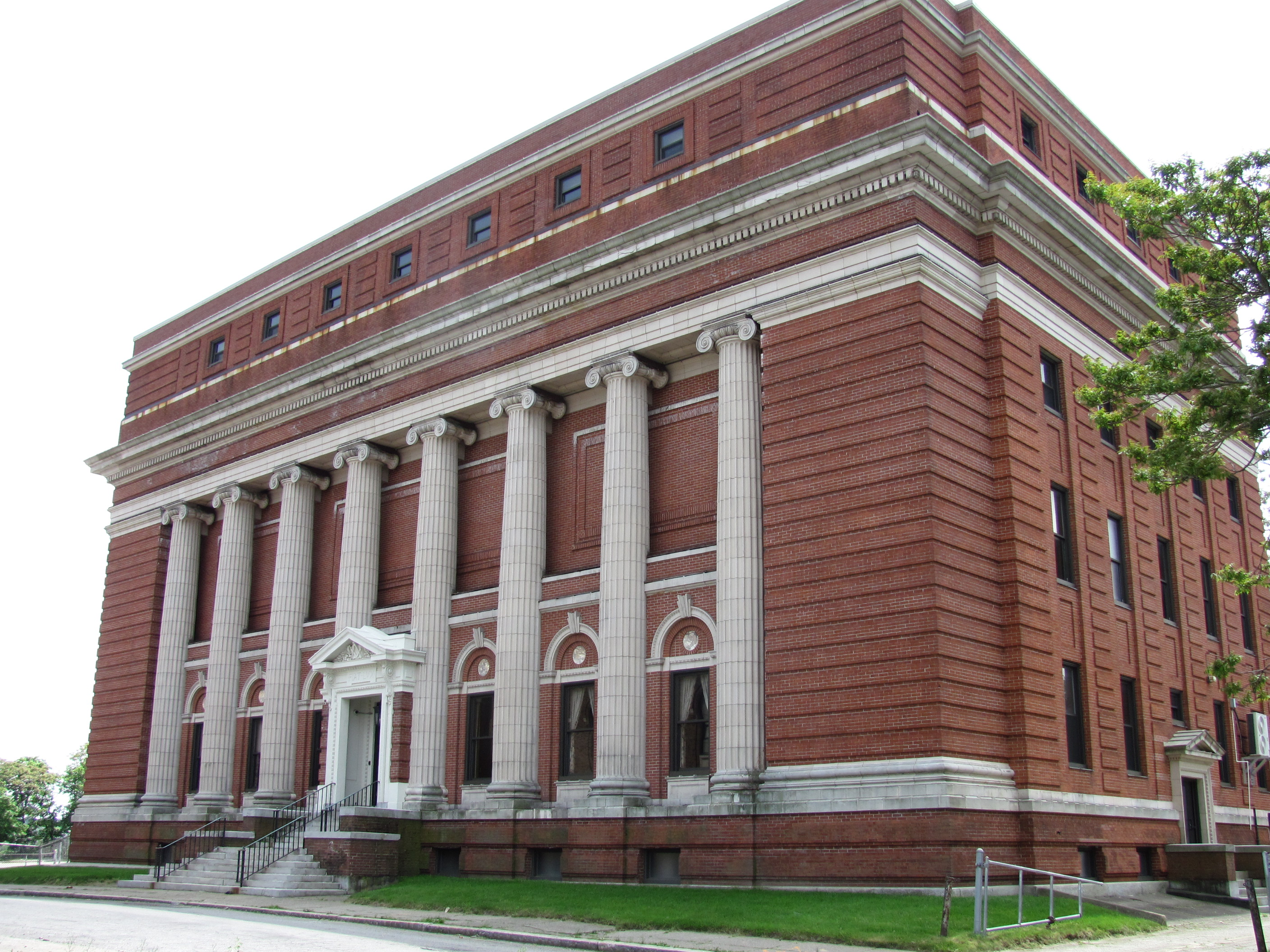
- Masonic Temple

- Location within Massachusetts Location within the United States
- Location: Ionic Ave., Worcester, Massachusetts
- Coordinates: 42°15′29″N 71°48′21″W
- Built: 1914
- Architect: Halcott, George C.
- Architectural style: Classical Revival
- MPS: Worcester MRA
- NRHP reference No.: 80000537
- Added to NRHP: March 05, 1980

The Worcester Masonic Temple is a historic Masonic temple Located at 1 Ionic Avenue in downtown Worcester, Massachusetts. Construction on the temple began on September 12, 1913, with the laying of the cornerstone. The building was finished and dedicated on September 3, 1914, by the then Grand Master, Most Worshipful Melvin M. Johnson.

The building is an excellent instance of a Classical Revival building. The three-story building's main facade is defined by eight Ionic columns (which supposedly gave Ionic Avenue its name), four on each side of central entry that is topped by a stone-pedimented entablature. The spaces between the other columns are filled by windows topped by rounded arches. The interior of the building features a drill hall and banquet hall on the ground floor, a "Grecian" chamber on the second level, and an "Egyptian" chamber on the third, as well as housing a Gothic chapel.

The temple was added to the National Register of Historic Places in 1980. It continues to be used by Masonic lodges.

== Organizations ==
- Morning Star Lodge A.F & A.M., founded in 1793

Other organizations using the facilities:

- The Worcester Chapter of Demolay
- The Worcester 32nd Degree Masonic Learning Center for Dyslexia
- The Scottish Rite Valley of Worcester, Northern Masonic Jurisdiction
- The York Rite Bodies of Worcester
- Thistle Lodge #2 of the Daughters of Scotia

== See also ==
- National Register of Historic Places listings in southwestern Worcester, Massachusetts
- National Register of Historic Places listings in Worcester County, Massachusetts
