= Masonic Temple (Paducah, Kentucky) =

- U.S. National Register of Historic Places
- Location within Kentucky Location within the United States
- Location: 501-505 S. 7th St., Paducah, Kentucky
- Coordinates: 37°4′50″N 88°35′58″W
- Area: less than one acre
- Built: 1904
- Architectural style: Classical Revival
- NRHP reference No.: 02001470
- Added to NRHP: December 04, 2002

The Masonic Temple in Paducah, Kentucky was a historic building dating from 1904. It was listed on the National Register of Historic Places in 2002.

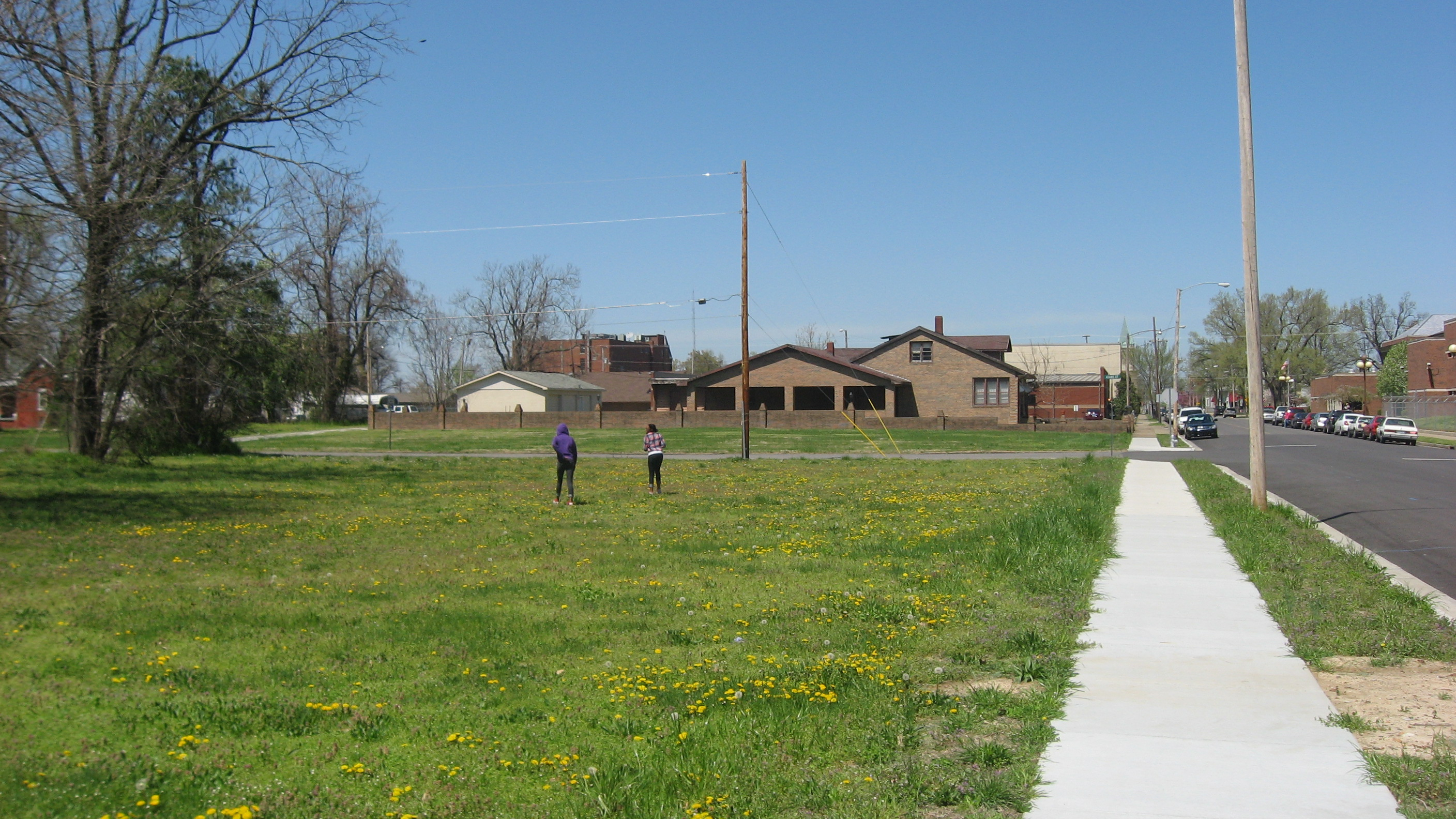
Site

Originally constructed by several local Prince Hall Masonic lodges, the building had retail shops on the ground floor, and lodge meeting rooms on the upper floors. In 1975 the African-American organizations moved to new premises, and the building became purely commercial in nature. It was still standing in 2002 when nominated for the National Register of Historic Places, but has subsequently been torn down.
