= Masonic Temple Building (Vermilion, Ohio) =

- U.S. National Register of Historic Places
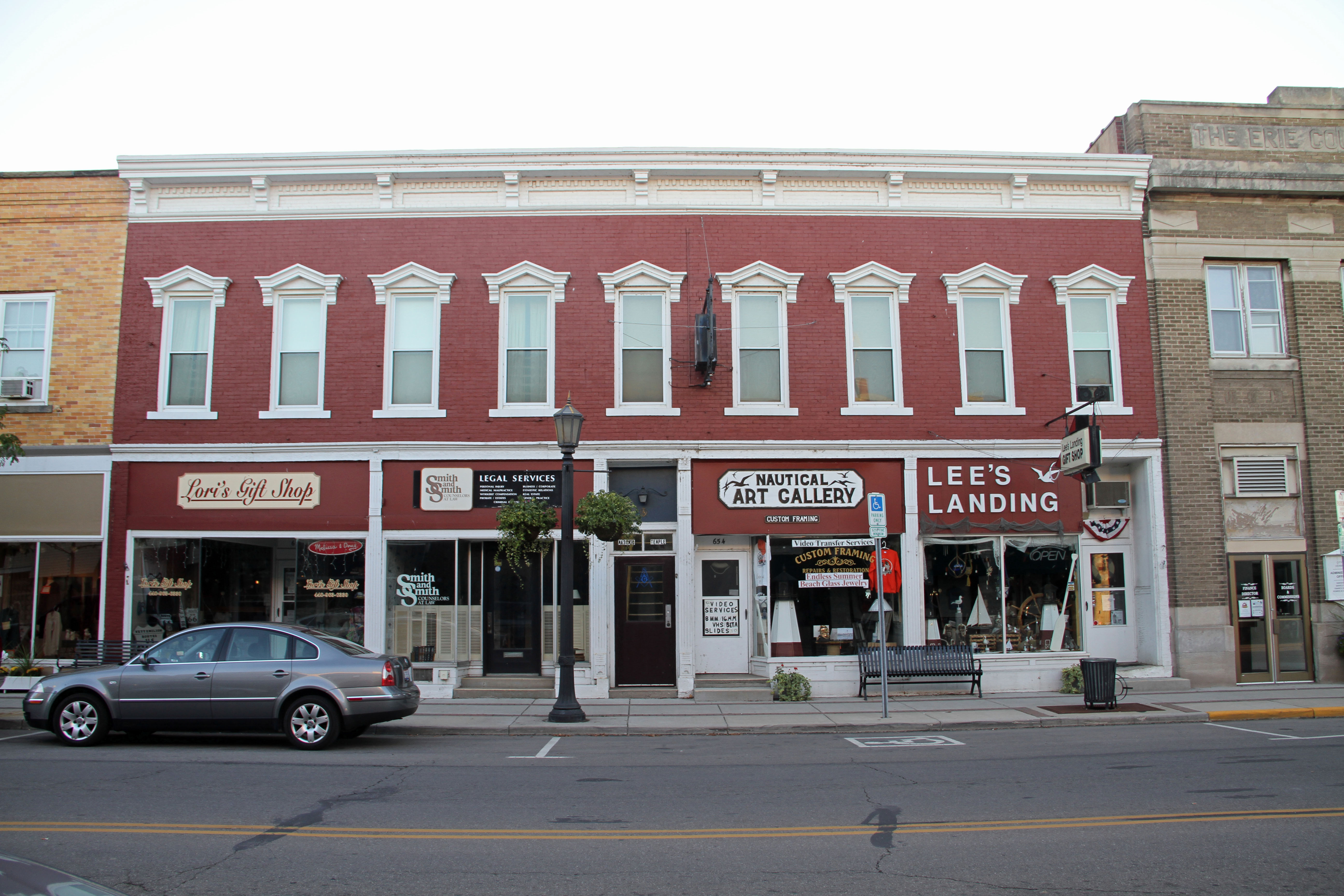

- Location within Ohio Location within the United States
- Location: Main St., S. of Liberty St., Vermilion, Ohio
- Coordinates: 41°25′18″N 82°21′55″W
- Area: less than one acre
- Built: 1870
- Architectural style: Italianate
- MPS: Vermilion-Harbour Town MRA
- NRHP reference No.: 79003950
- Added to NRHP: November 14, 1979

The Masonic Temple Building in Vermilion, Ohio, located on Main St., is a building from 1870. It was listed on the National Register of Historic Places in 1979.

The current Masonic lodge in Vermillion, "Ely Lodge #424", is located at 654-1/2 Main Street.
