= Masonic Temple Building (Marshall, Michigan) =

- U.S. National Register of Historic Places
- U.S. National Historic Landmark District – Contributing property
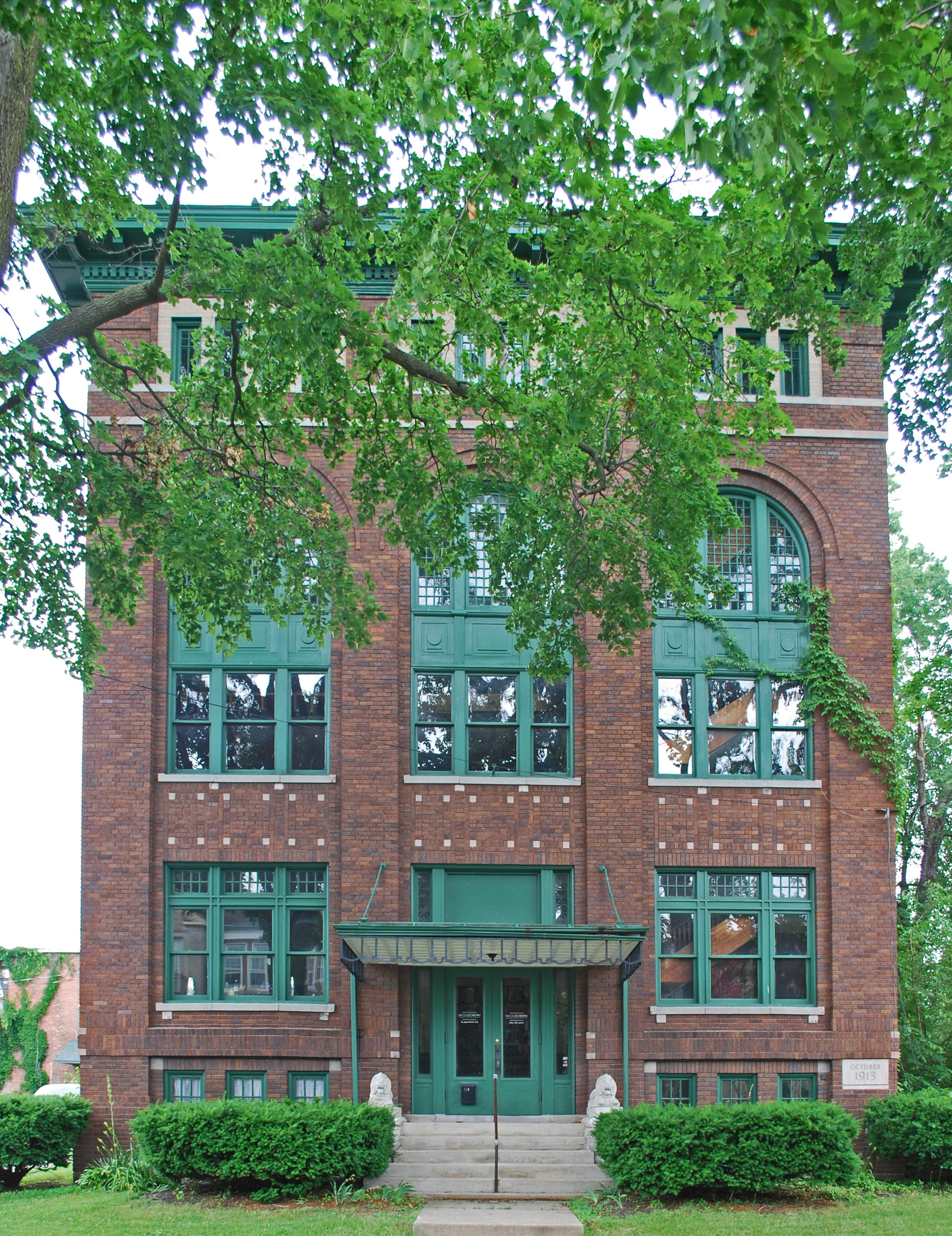

- Location within Michigan Location within the United States
- Interactive map
- Location: 115 E. Green St., Marshall, Michigan
- Coordinates: 42°16′17″N 84°57′29″W
- Area: 0.2 acres (0.081 ha)
- Built: 1913
- Built by: O.J. Reniger
- Architect: Frederick H. Spier
- Architectural style: Late 19th And 20th Century Revivals, Italian Renaissance
- Part of: Marshall Michigan Historic Landmark District (ID91002053)
- NRHP reference No.: 88001836
- Added to NRHP: September 29, 1988

The Masonic Temple Building in Marshall, Michigan, is a building from 1913. It was listed on the National Register of Historic Places in 1988. Today it houses Dance Dynamics and Engelter Photography.

== History ==
The first Masonic Lodge in Marshall was the St. Albans Lodge #20, chartered in 1847. Other lodges were also established over the next two decades, and by 1867 there were four lodges in the city. These lodges met in rooms located on the upper floor of the Leyden Plumbing Company. However, by 1869, they quarters had grown too small, and in 1871 they moved to a new lodge hall located on the floors above the Barginette Store. However, in 1875 the city suffered an economic crash when the Michigan Central Railroad moved much of its operations to Jackson, Michigan. It took nearly 50 years for the city to recover.

In the early 20th century, Masonic organizations all over Michigan were expanding. In 1911, the Marshall Masonic lodges banded together to form the Masonic Temple Association, established for the purpose of building and operating their own temple. The Association raised funds and went through two rounds of bidding before approving a design by Frederick H. Spier in 1913. Construction started in May 1913 and was completed in late 1914. The temple was used by Masonic organizations until 1987, when the Masonic Temple Association was dissolved and the building sold for redevelopment.

== Description ==
The Masonic Temple is a five-story dark red brick building with grey stone trim. It measures ninety-five feet by forty-three feet. The building occupies a corner lot. The front facade is divided into three window bays, containing tripartite windows, separated by brick piers. The facade along the side street is similarly divided into six bays, five of which contain windows. Windows in the basement level are double-hung, six-over-six, sash window units set in triples. Windows on the first floor are tripled double-hung sash units topped with a transom of eight or twelve lights. The center bay of the main facade contains the entrance, reached by a series of six steps and covered with a steel-and-glass canopy added in 1925–26. The second and third floors contain large arched window units spanning both floors; set into the arches are tripartite widow clusters similar to those on the first floor. The attic contains a four-part bank of vertical windows is framed by a raised brick course in each bay. A galvanized cornice and slightly hipped roof is located above.
