= Masonic Temple Building (Cadillac, Michigan) =

- U.S. National Register of Historic Places
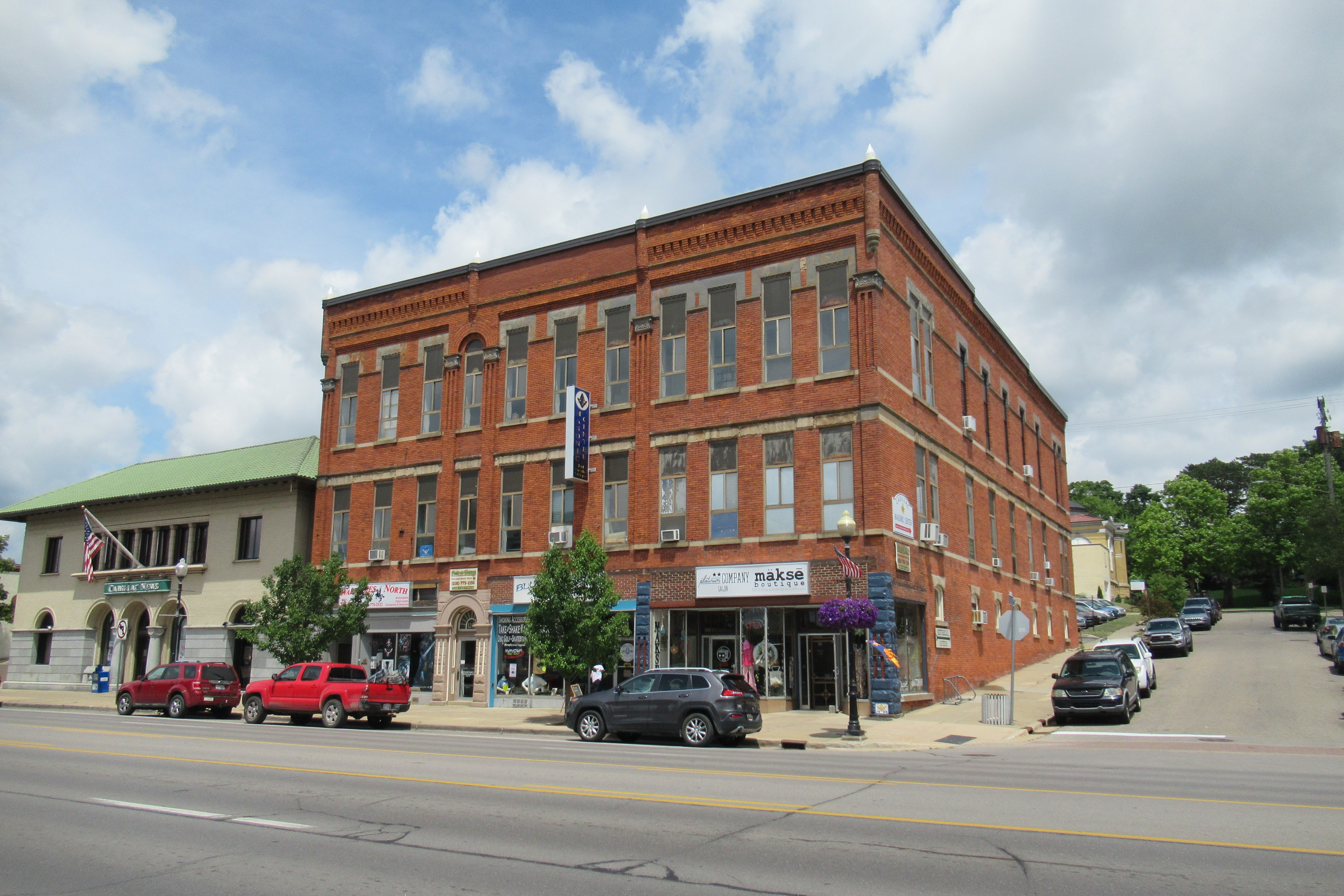

- Location within Michigan Location within the United States
- Interactive map
- Location: 122-126 N. Mitchell St., Cadillac, Michigan
- Coordinates: 44°15′5″N 85°24′0″W
- Area: less than one acre
- Built: 1889
- Built by: John Mosser and Charles Dutton
- Architect: Sidney Osgood
- Architectural style: Romanesque
- NRHP reference No.: 94000747
- Added to NRHP: July 22, 1994

The Masonic Temple in Cadillac, Michigan is a commercial building built in 1899. It is the earliest surviving fraternal building designed by the prolific architect Sidney Osgood. It was listed on the National Register of Historic Places in 1994.

== History ==
The Clam Lake Masonic Lodge #331 was founded in 1876 in the village of Clam Lake (which was later renamed Cadillac). The lodge met in a series of buildings, and in the late 1880s began plans to construct their own building. In 1889, the Masons put together financing, combining guaranteed leases of sections of the planned building and the sale of $20,000 of bonds. They hired architect Sidney Osgood from Grand Rapids to design the building, and jointly contracted local builders Charles W. Dutton and John G. Mosser to construct it. Excavation work began in August 1889; exterior work was completed by November, and the first tenants occupied the building in February 1890.

The second floor of the building was originally rented to Wexford County, and was the first "permanent" location of the Wexford County offices in Cadillac. The county offices were located in this building from 1890 through 1912. Other tenants have subsequently used it for office space. The Masons moved into the third floor of the building in 1890, and had remained in this location until the present. The third floor of the building has also housed other fraternal clubs, including the Order of Eastern Star Ladies Auxiliary (circa 1890), Chapter 103 of the Royal Arch Masons (circa 1910), and Council 70 of the Royal and Select Masters (circa 1910).

== Description ==
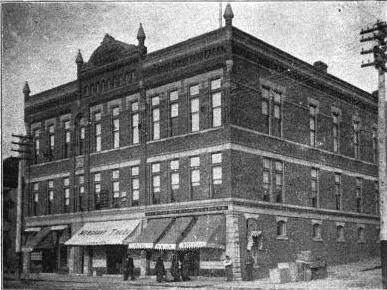
Masonic Hall c1900

The Cadillac Masonic Temple is a three-story Romanesque brick and stone commercial building measuring 75 feet (23 m) by 100 feet (30 m). The building is three bays wide, containing three storefronts and an entryway to the upper floors. The first floor contains a rusticated stone arch and stone piers, and cut stone belt courses are located between the floors on three of the four sides. The three store fronts have recessed entrances, transom windows, and panels below the display windows as originally built, but have been slightly modified over time. Window hoods on the upper floors are made of cut stone, and additional decorative brick detailing highlights the third floor window arch. A brick cornice tops the facade, but the original segmental arch pediment has been removed.

On the interior, the first floor is divided into three retail shops, with configurations identical to what they were at the time of the building's construction. The second floor is subdivided for office and service uses, and the arrangement of these divisions has changed over the years. The third floor is used by the Masonic Lodge, and is significant in that the area has been in continuous use as the Masonic Lodge since 1889, with little change.

On the third floor, the Temple room and adjacent entry room has undergone almost no change since the original construction. The room has unaltered maple flooring, stamped decorative tin ceiling, pebbled tin wall and oak moldings. All of the furnishings, including chairs, display cases, and spitoons, are original to the lodge. The surrounding rooms, including kitchen, dining room and lounge, have undergone some renovations but retain their maple flooring.

== See also ==
- List of Masonic buildings in Michigan
- National Register of Historic Places listings in Wexford County, Michigan
