= Masonic Temple Building (Maywood, Illinois) =

- U.S. National Register of Historic Places
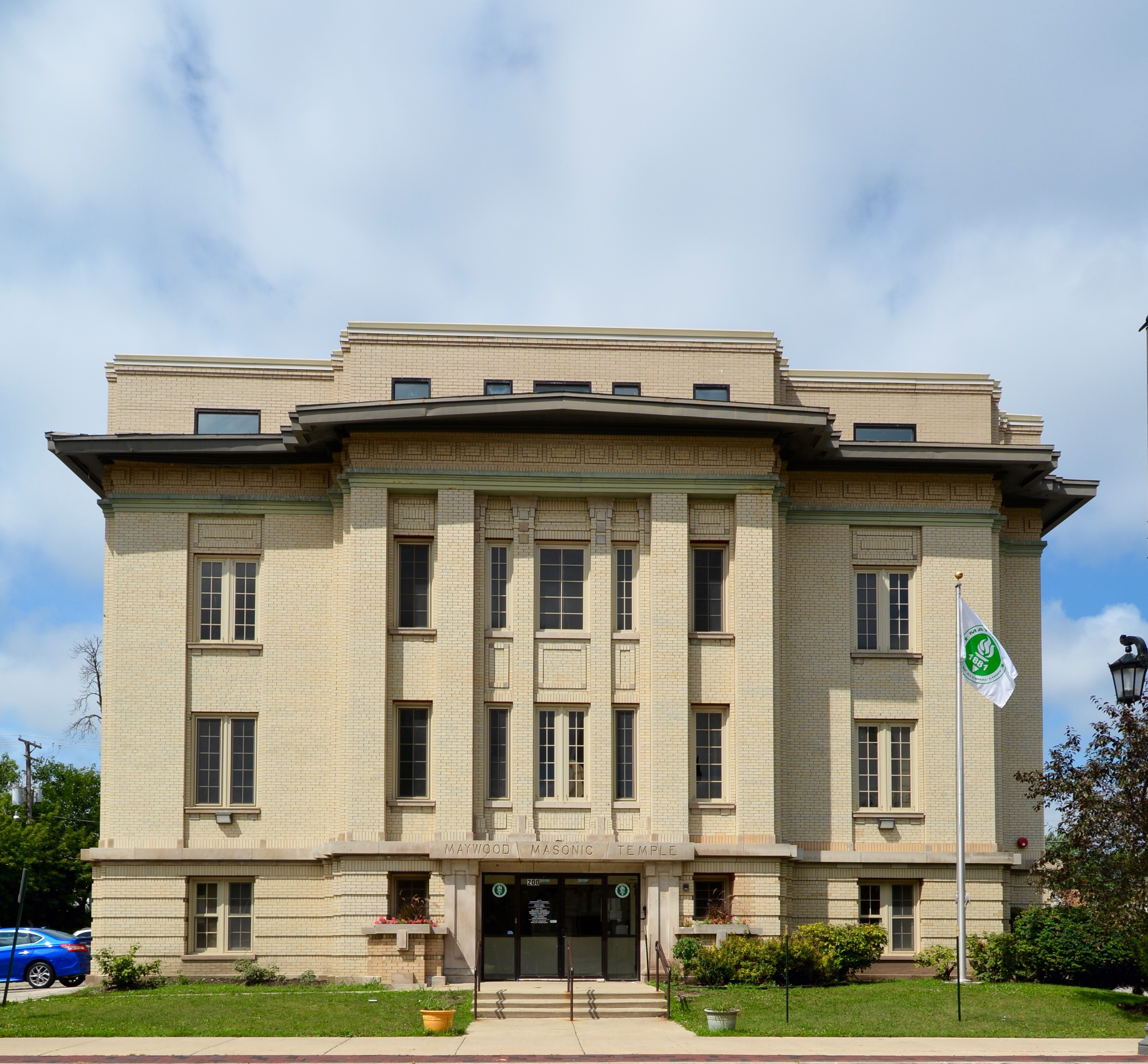

- Location within Illinois Location within the United States
- Location: 200 S. 5th Ave., Maywood, Illinois
- Coordinates: 41°53′9″N 87°50′22″W
- Area: 1 acre (0.40 ha)
- Built: 1917
- Architect: Eben Ezra Roberts
- Architectural style: Prairie School
- MPS: Maywood MPS
- NRHP reference No.: 92000491
- Added to NRHP: May 22, 1992

The Masonic Temple in Maywood, Illinois is a building from 1917. It was designed with Prairie School architectural elements by architect Eben Ezra Roberts.

It was listed on the National Register of Historic Places in 1992.

At some later date, it housed the Maywood Parks and Recreation Dept.
