= Masonic Temple Building (Stuart, Iowa) =

- U.S. National Register of Historic Places
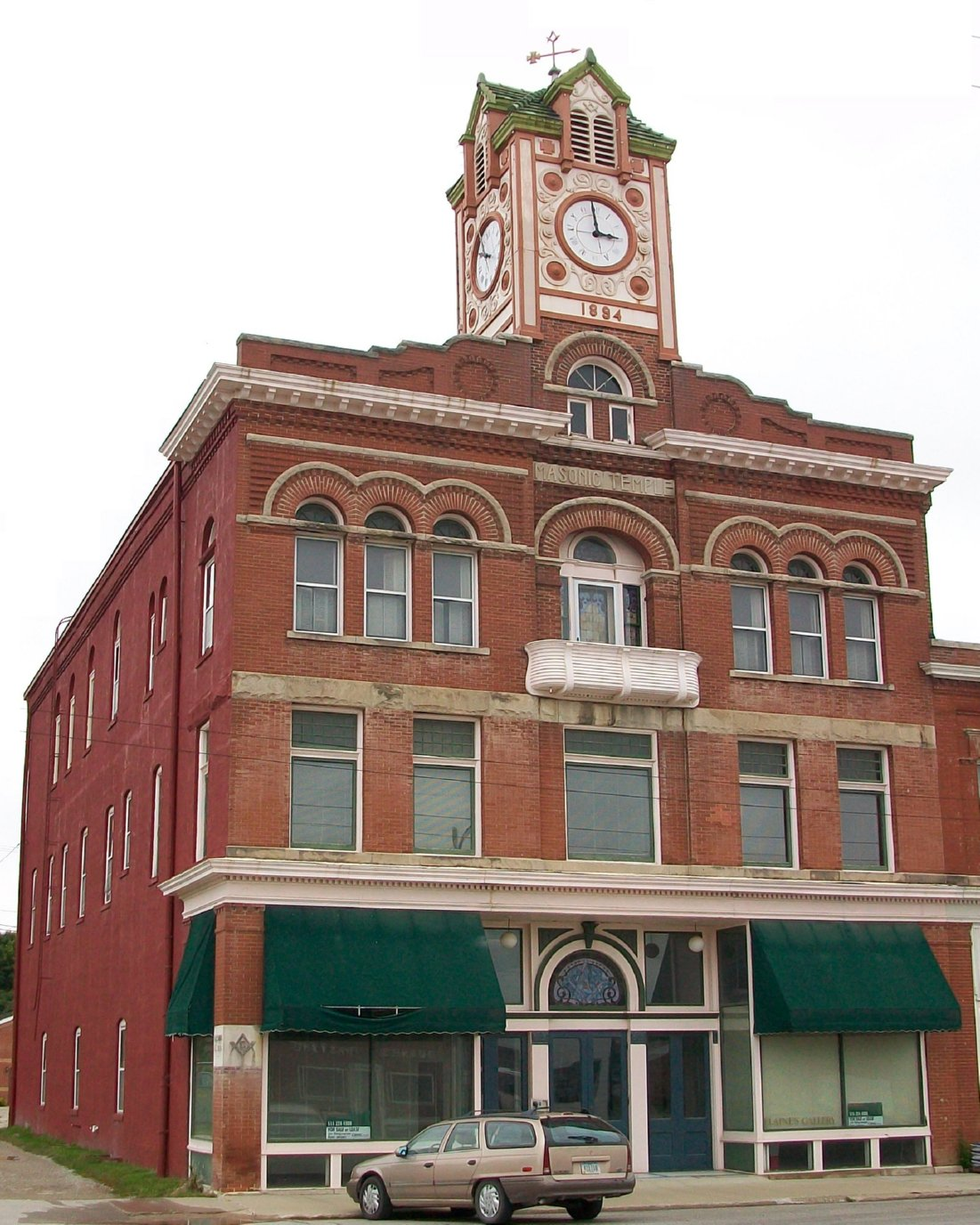

- Location within Iowa Location within the United States
- Location: 111 NW 2nd St. Stuart, Iowa
- Coordinates: 41°30′18″N 94°19′7″W
- Area: less than one acre
- Built: 1894
- Architect: Merrill and Smith
- Architectural style: Romanesque Revival; Colonial Revival
- NRHP reference No.: 96000400
- Added to NRHP: April 12, 1996

The Masonic Temple is a historic building located in Stuart, Iowa, United States. The Des Moines architectural firm of Merrill and Smith designed the building in a combination of the Romanesque Revival and the Colonial Revival styles. The Romanesque Revival influence is found in the use of round-arched windows on the upper floors and the main entry on the first floor. The Colonial Revival influence is found in the clock tower, the stepped roof cornice, and the multi-pane transoms above the second-floor windows.

The Masons built the structure in 1894. Originally the first floor housed commercial space, with professional offices on the second floor and Masonic Order occupied the third and fourth floors. The Masons sold the building in 1970. The first floor continues to house retail space and residential apartments are located on the upper floors. The building was listed on the National Register of Historic Places in 1996.
