= Masonic Temple Building (Kalamazoo, Michigan) =

- U.S. National Register of Historic Places
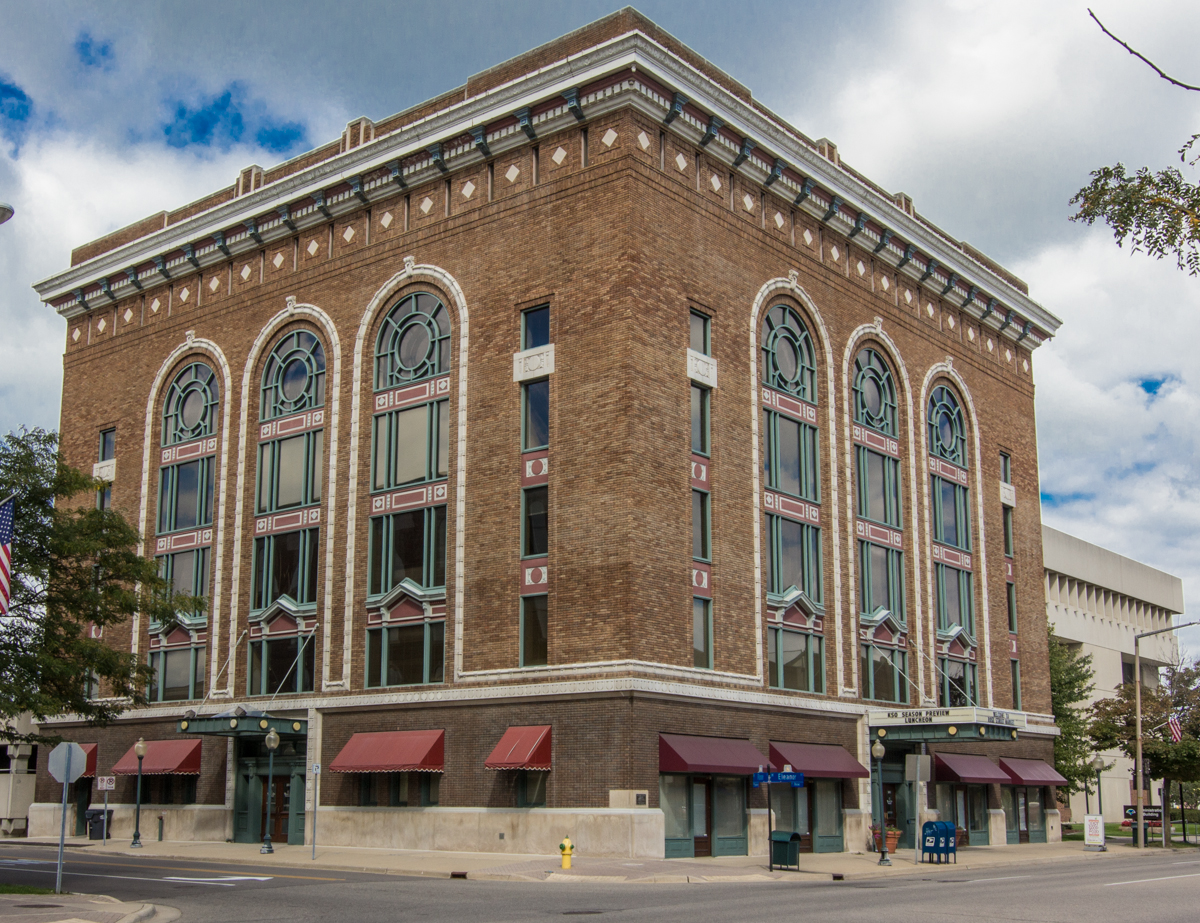

- Location within Michigan Location within the United States
- Interactive map
- Location: 309 N. Rose St., Kalamazoo, Michigan
- Coordinates: 42°17′38″N 85°35′6″W
- Area: 0.3 acres (0.12 ha)
- Built: 1913
- Architect: Spier & Rohns
- Architectural style: Italian Renaissance
- NRHP reference No.: 80001876
- Added to NRHP: May 12, 1980

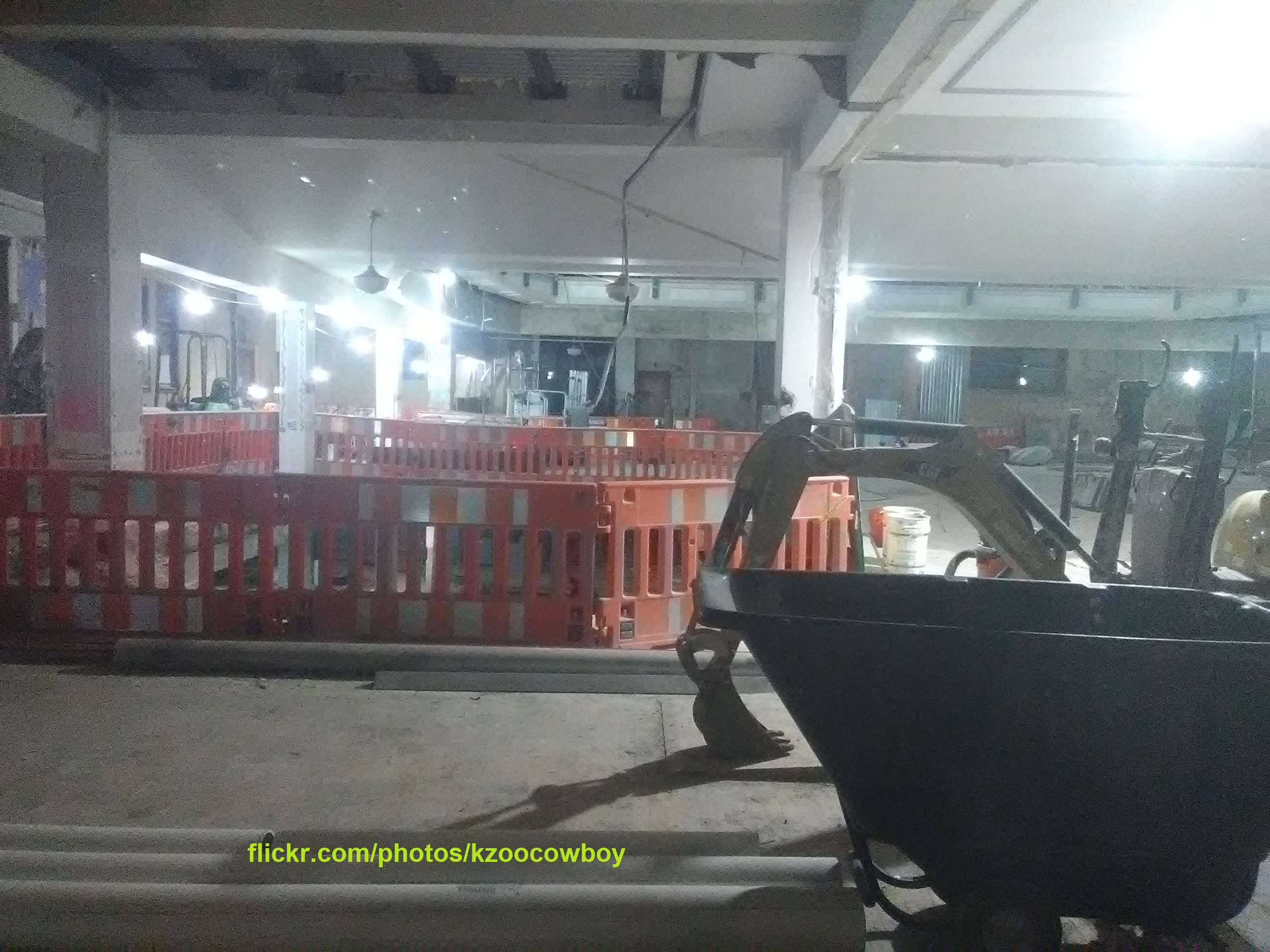

The Masonic Temple in Kalamazoo, Michigan, is a building from 1913. It was listed on the National Register of Historic Places in 1980. No lodges currently meet in the building.

== History ==
Masonic Lodge No. 22 was founded in Kalamazoo in 1848. The lodge used temporary meeting quarters until 1852 when they outfitted a hall in a downtown commercial building. However, by 1868 this room was too small, and the masons decided to construct their own building, the Masonic Hall. By the early twentieth century, this too was outmoded, and eleven local Masonic organizations joined to construct a replacement, this Masonic Temple Building. They hired the Detroit architectural firm of Spier & Rohns to draft plans, and construction began in 1913. The building was completed in 1915.

The Temple served the local Masonic community for nearly five decades and was also used for public events. However, in 1963, the cost of upkeep became too great and the Masons constructed a replacement building and sold the 1913 Temple. Plans to convert it into office space did not succeed, and in 1975 Kalamazoo County purchased the building. They sold it later, and the building was rebranded the "Rose Street Market." The building was sold again in 2015. As of 2019, the building is vacant and a redevelopment into a hotel was planned. In 2020 a Hilton Garden Inn opened on the site.

== Description ==
The Kalamazoo Masonic Temple Building is a six-story square flat-roofed building measuring one hundred by one hundred feet. The street facades are clad with brown-colored brick with the other two facades clad in yellow brick. The main facades have molded terra cotta horseshoe-shaped surrounds that contain four-stay, round-headed window units. Terra cotta strips connect the surrounds. A metal cornice runs across the top of the building.
