= Masonic Temple Building (East Lansing, Michigan) =

- U.S. National Register of Historic Places
- Michigan State Historic Site
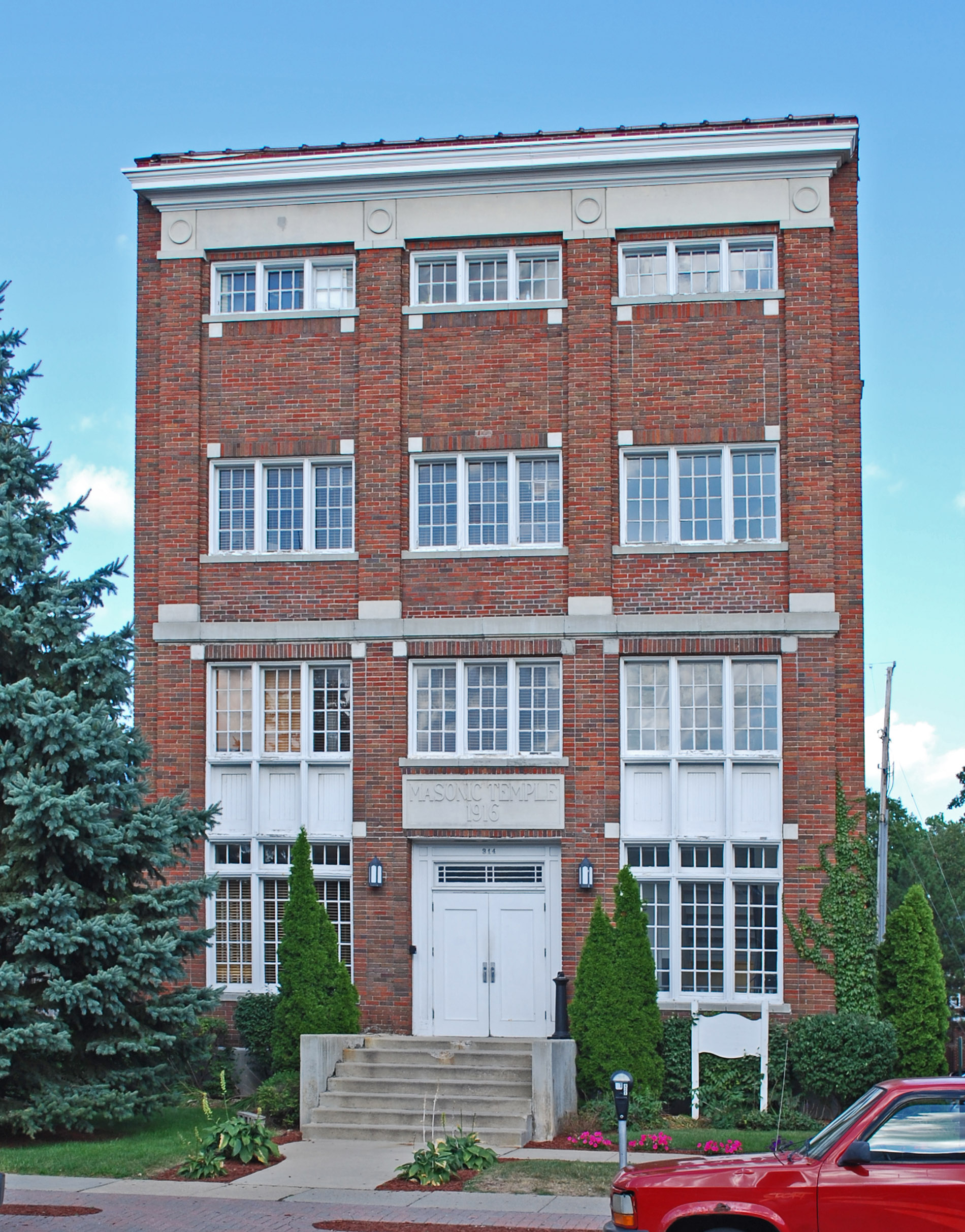

- Location within Michigan Location within the United States
- Interactive map
- Location: 314 M.A.C. Ave., East Lansing, Michigan
- Coordinates: 42°44′10″N 84°28′49″W
- Area: less than one acre
- Built: 1916
- Architect: Samuel Dana Butterworth
- Architectural style: Classical Revival
- NRHP reference No.: 98001083

Significant dates
- Added to NRHP: March 29, 1999
- Designated MSHS: January 18, 2001

The Masonic Temple Building, located at 314 M.A.C. Avenue in East Lansing, Michigan, is a building constructed in 1916 for the Freemasons. It was listed on the National Register of Historic Places in 1999.

== History ==
The city of East Lansing grew explosively at the beginning of the twentieth century, alongside the growth of what is now Michigan State University. The Masonic Temple Association of East Lansing, Michigan was formed in 1915 by the local Masons, and immediately began plans to finance and construct a new Masonic Temple. They issued bonds to raise money, and hired Lansing architect Samuel Dana Butterworth to design the building and contractor Thomas Early and Sons to construct it. Construction was started early in 1916, and completed by October of the same year.

However, the Masons soon had trouble meeting their debt payments, an issue which reoccurred for the next few decades. The onset of the Great Depression exacerbated the issue, and the lodge refinanced the debt, which was finally paid off in 1948. However, lodge members soon expressed dissatisfaction with the location of the downtown location of the temple, and by the 1960s were discussing moving to a new building. The Masons moved out in the early 1980s, and sold the building in 1986.

In the late 1990s, the building was rehabilitated into apartments and office space. As of 2012, the building had been converted to residential and office use, and the local Masons meet in another building nearby.

== Description ==
The East Lansing Masonic Temple Building is a four-story, rectangular building with brick exterior walls. The building is Classical Revival in design, with Arts and Crafts influences. It has a symmetrical front facade clad in dark reddish-brown brick, and contrasting lighter reddish-brown brick on the other facades. The facade is divided into three bays by projecting piers, topped with a flat concrete entablature and cornice, and intersected by a concrete beltcourse between the second and third stories. In the center of the facade is a double-door entrance, with triple windows in each story above, and in each of the two side bays. The side walls were originally blank, but now contain a regular pattern of small double-hung windows, added during the 1990s renovation.
