= Holy Trinity Anglican Church, Coburg =

Heritage-listed Anglican church in Melbourne, Victoria, Australia

Holy Trinity Anglican Church
- Coburg Anglican Church
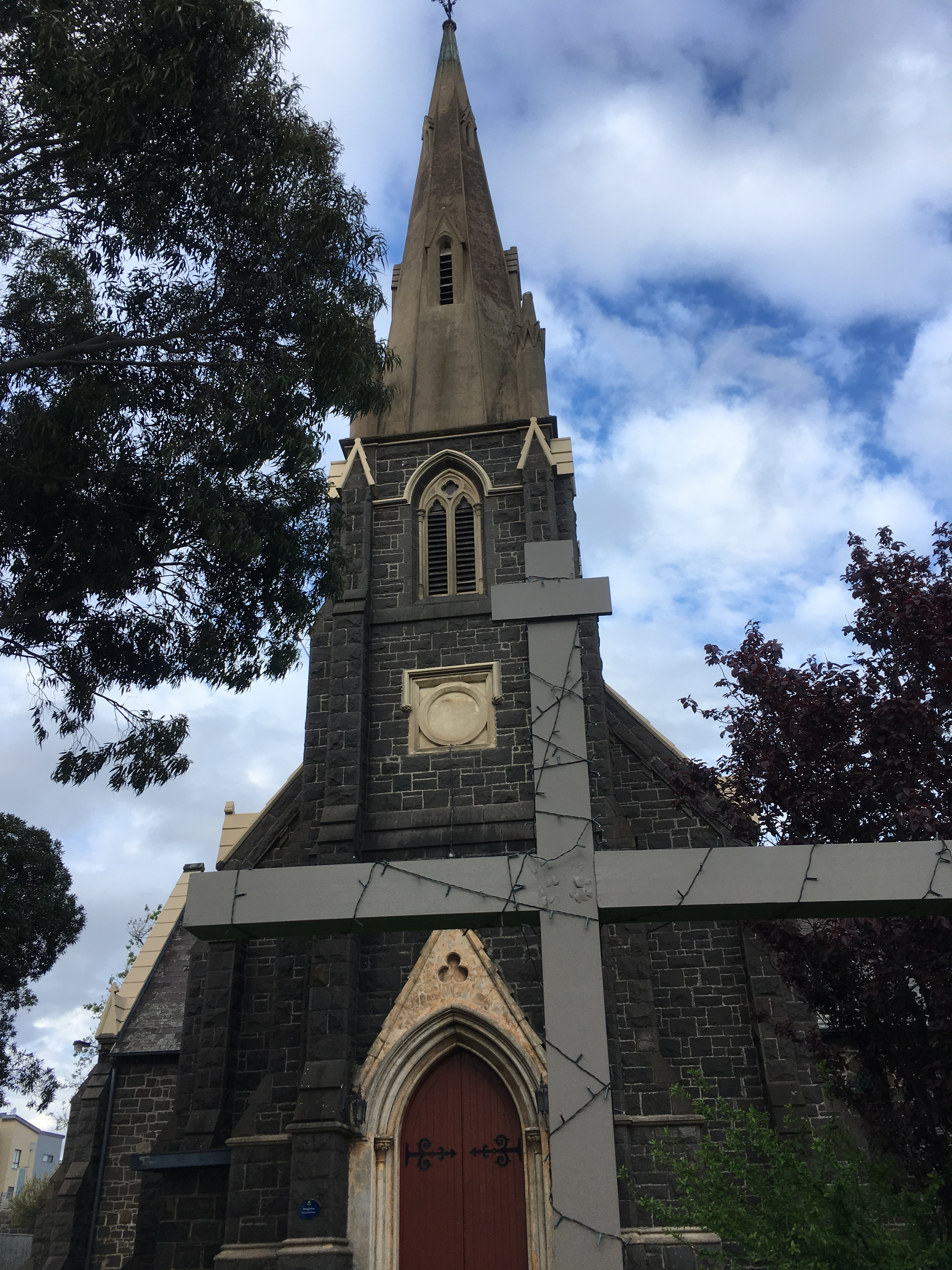
- The church exterior, 2019

- Location of the church in Greater Metropolitan Melbourne
- Holy Trinity Anglican Church
- 37°44′22″S 144°58′03″E
- Location: 520 Sydney Road, Coburg, Melbourne, Victoria
- Country: Australia
- Denomination: Anglican

History
- Status: Parish church
- Founded: 1848
- Dedication: Holy Trinity

Architecture
- Functional status: Active
- Architects: Charles Vickers (1854); Sydney Smith (1869); Evander McIver (1883); Wystan Widdows (1957)
- Architectural type: Church
- Style: Gothic Revival
- Years built: 1854–1883
- Groundbreaking: 9 October 1854 (foundation stone)
- Completed: 1855; 171 years ago: 1854: transepts, chancel; 1857: nave, porch, tower; 1869: spire; 1883: north transept (rebuilt); 1957: organ (rebuilt)

Specifications
- Materials: Bluestone; sandstone; stained glass windows

Administration
- Diocese: Melbourne

Clergy
- Vicar: Rev Farag Ibrahim Girgis

Site notes
- Sculptor: William Stanford

Victorian Heritage Register
- Official name: Holy Trinity Anglican Complex
- Type: Registered place
- Designated: 11 February 1993
- Reference no.: H0959
- Heritage overlay no.: HO83
- Category: Religion

Register of the National Estate
- Official name: Holy Trinity Anglican Church and Sunday School, Coburg
- Type: Defunct register
- Designated: undated
- Reference no.: 18485

The Holy Trinity Anglican Church is an Anglican parish church located at 520 Sydney Road, in Coburg, an inner northern suburb of Melbourne, in Victoria, Australia. Built in stages between 1848 and 1883, the church was designed in the Gothic Revival style.

The church complex (including a former school building) was added to the Victorian Heritage Register on 11 February 1993, and to the non-statutory lists of the Victorian branch of the National Trust on 26 May 1988, and the now-defunct Register of the National Estate on an unknown date.

In 2023, it was reported that the proportion of parishioners of Arabic backgrounds was steadily growing.

== History ==
The foundation stone for the Holy Trinity Church Coburg was laid on 9 October 1854 and the first service was held on 30 September 1855. The existing church is an agglomeration of a number of additions, alterations, demolitions and reconstructions, the major building works having been carried out between 1848 and 1869. Although the original 1848 church was replaced with a new nave in 1854, the church is effectively amongst the oldest churches in Victoria.

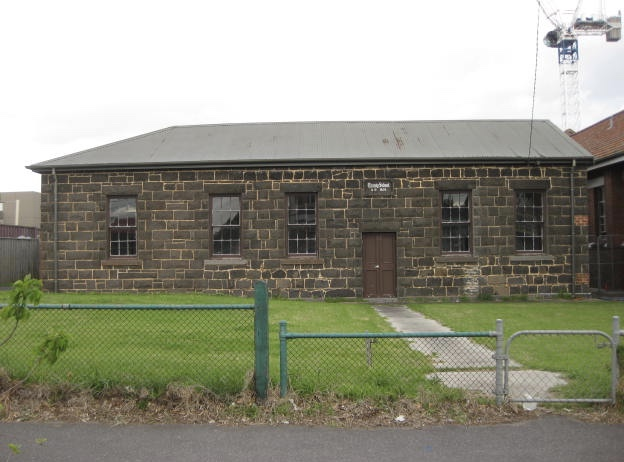
Former school building, in 2019

The Holy Trinity School was established in 1850 when day classes were held in the church. The former Holy Trinity School building was constructed in 1857 and is believed to have been altered in 1879. The school is amongst the earliest extant Anglican school buildings in the State.

The church and former school demonstrate the continued use and changing requirements of the Coburg parish, which is amongst the oldest in the State.

== Description ==
The transepts and chancel, designed by Charles Vickers, were constructed in 1854, these were added to the original church (this is believed to have been a simple bluestone building which had been designed to accommodate later additions to the east). In 1857, the whole of the original church was replaced with a bluestone nave; the entry porch and tower are believed to have been erected the same time in the same program of works. The sandstone spire and pinnacles were erected in 1869 to the design of Sydney Smith. The north transept was reconstructed following its collapse in 1883. Evander McIver supervised the works. The interior of the church was substantially altered a number of times, most recently in the late 1960s to accommodate liturgical changes. The church contains a baptismal font carved from a single piece of bluestone by the noted sculptor and Pentridge inmate William Stanford.

A stained-glass window was dedicated in the church in 1902.

=== Organ ===
The two-manual pipe organ was opened on 27 December 1888. The organ was initially placed at the west end on the floor, and moved to the south transept in October 1892. Further modifications were made in 1893. In 1956, Hill, Norman & Beard were commissioned to rebuild the organ that included new electro-pneumatic action, a detached stop key console and many tonal revisions. The organ was moved to a platform at the west end of the building, the work supervised by Wystan Widdows. The re-dedication of the organ took place on 15 September 1957.

== See also ==
- Architecture of Melbourne
- List of Anglican churches in Melbourne
- List of places on the Victorian Heritage Register in the City of Merri-bek
