= List of Masonic buildings =

List of Masonic buildings includes notable buildings around the world associated with Freemasonry. Often these are significant landmarks in their towns or cities, and reflect the influence of Masons at one time. Most are buildings built for exclusive or shared use by Masonic lodges, Grand Lodges or other Masonic bodies. Many include original commercial space on ground or lower floors, with space intended for group meetings above. (For a list of those within the United States, see: List of Masonic buildings in the United States)

Most of the buildings on this list were purpose-built to house Masonic lodge meetings and ritual activities. In a few cases, Masonic bodies converted existing landmark buildings to Masonic use. Also included are buildings constructed by the Freemasons as part of their charitable endeavors (such as hospitals and schools). This list is intended to include any building having some form of landmark status such as being listed on heritage registers, and other notable ones as well.

== Australia ==
=== New South Wales ===
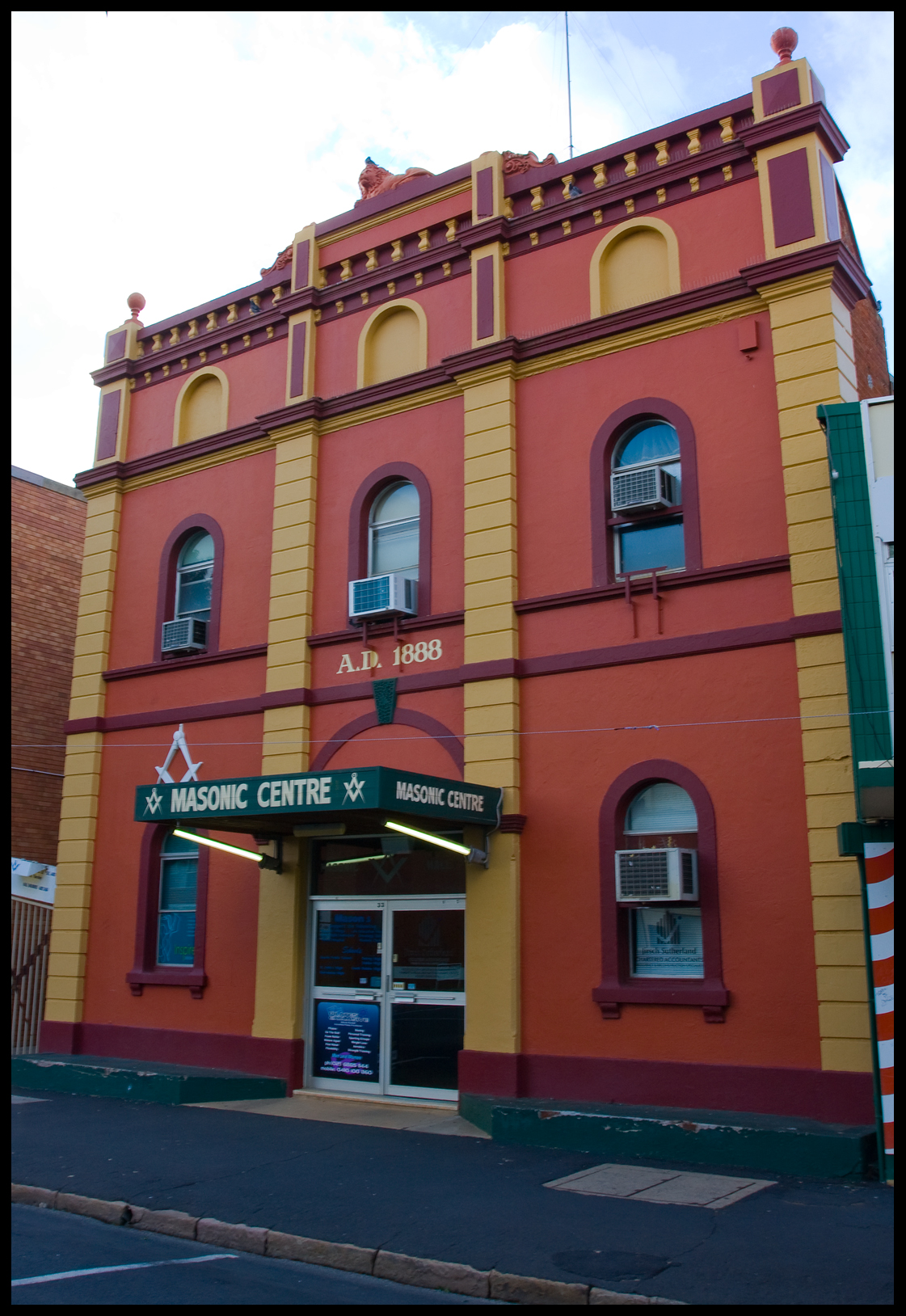
Dubbo Masonic Centre

- Artarmon Masonic Centre, Artarmon (1923) – the building was sold to a developer in the 1990s and demolished
- Dubbo Masonic Centre, Dubbo (1888) – under renovation in 2021
- Masonic Temple, Illawarra (c. 1870) – listed on the State Heritage Inventory
- Maitland Lodge of Unity Masonic Hall and Lodge, Maitland (1887) – listed on the State Heritage Inventory
- Murwillumbah Masonic Temple, Murwillumbah (1909) –
- Royal Arch Temple, Petersham – its Egyptian Room, originally built within the Scottish Royal Arch Temple at 22-24 College Street Sydney in 1927 and later moved, is listed on the State Heritage Inventory
- Sydney Masonic Centre, Sydney –

=== Queensland ===
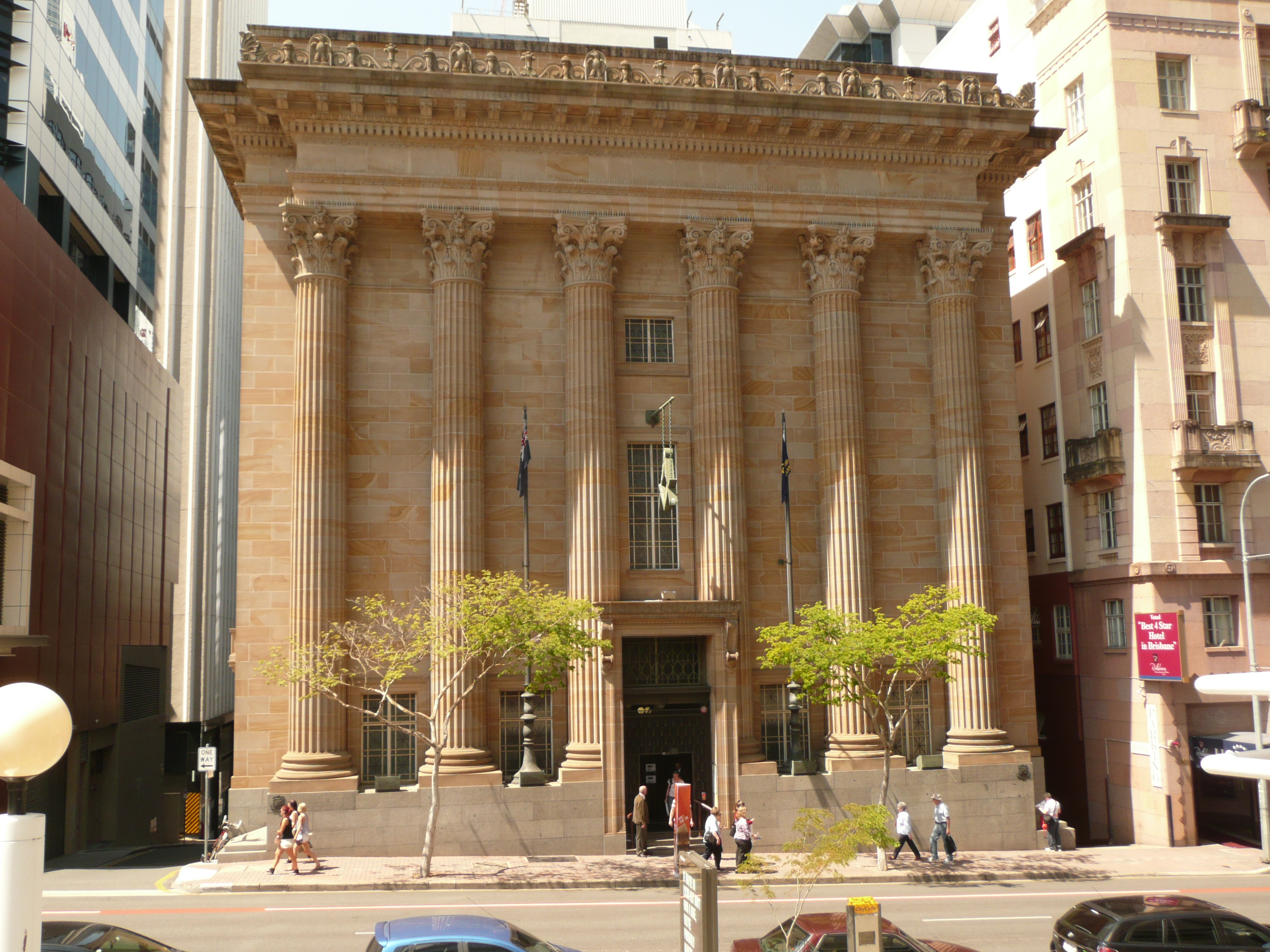
Brisbane Masonic Temple

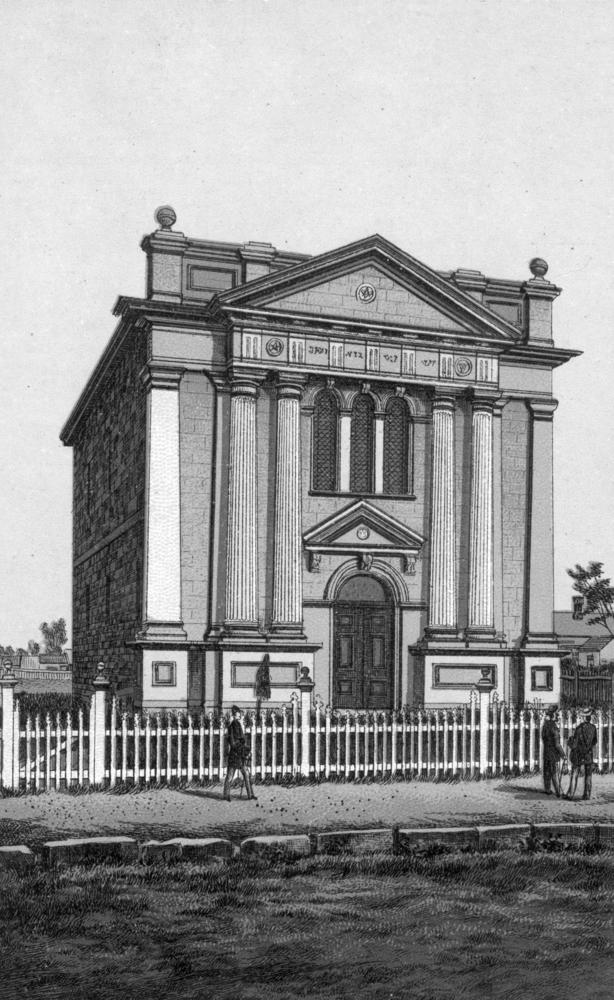
St George's Masonic Centre, Warwick, c. 1887

- Barcaldine Masonic Temple – state-level registered
- Blackall Masonic Temple – state-level registered
- Brisbane Masonic Temple – state-level registered
- Cairns Masonic Temple – state-level registered
- Charters Towers Masonic Lodge – state-level registered
- Cooroora Masonic Temple, Pomona – state-level registered
- Isis Masonic Lodge, Childers – state-level registered
- Mackay Masonic Temple – state-level registered
- Townsville Masonic Hall – state-level registered
- Mount Morgan Masonic Temple – state-level registered
- Mount Perry Masonic Lodge – state-level registered
- Rockhampton Masonic Hall – state-level registered
- St George's Masonic Centre, Warwick – listed on the Queensland Heritage Register
- Yangan Masonic Hall – state-level registered

=== South Australia ===
- Freemasons Hall, North Terrace, Adelaide
- Port Adelaide Masonic Hall, Port Adelaide (1927)

=== Victoria ===
- Collingwood United Masonic Temple, Abbotsford –
- Ballarat Masonic Centre, Ballarat –
- Bendigo Chinese Masonic Temple (c. 1860s) – listed on the Victorian Heritage Register; despite its name, the building's links with Freemasonry are unclear
- Bendigo Masonic Hall (1873) – repurposed as the The Capital, listed on the Victorian Heritage Register
- Masonic Hall, Camperdown (1867–1868) – listed on the Victorian Heritage Register
- Emulation Hall, Canterbury (1927–1928) – listed on the Victorian Heritage Register
- Creswick Masonic Centre, Creswick –
- Ivalda Masonic Temple, Darebin –
- Dallas Brooks Centre, Melbourne (1969) – concert hall built in 1969 as "Dallas Brooks Center", by the United Grand Lodge Victoria (UGLV). Renamed in 1993. A major events venue in Melbourne. One of only two significant surviving brutalist strip architecture examples left in Australia, the other being the 1968-built National Library of Australia building in Canberra.
- Freemasons Hospital, Melbourne – listed on the Victorian Heritage Database; originally constructed by the United Grand Lodge of Victoria as an "intermediate" or "community" hospital for Freemasons and their families. The hospital was purchased in 2006 by ING Real Estate in 2006, and leased to Epworth Healthcare
- Royal Freemasons Homes, Punt Road and Moubray Street, Melbourne (1910) – cottages listed on the Victorian Heritage Register
- Masonic Centre, Sandringham (1931) – ceased use as a lodge in 2017; repurposed as a community centre by the City of Bayside; listed on the Victorian Heritage Register

=== Western Australia ===
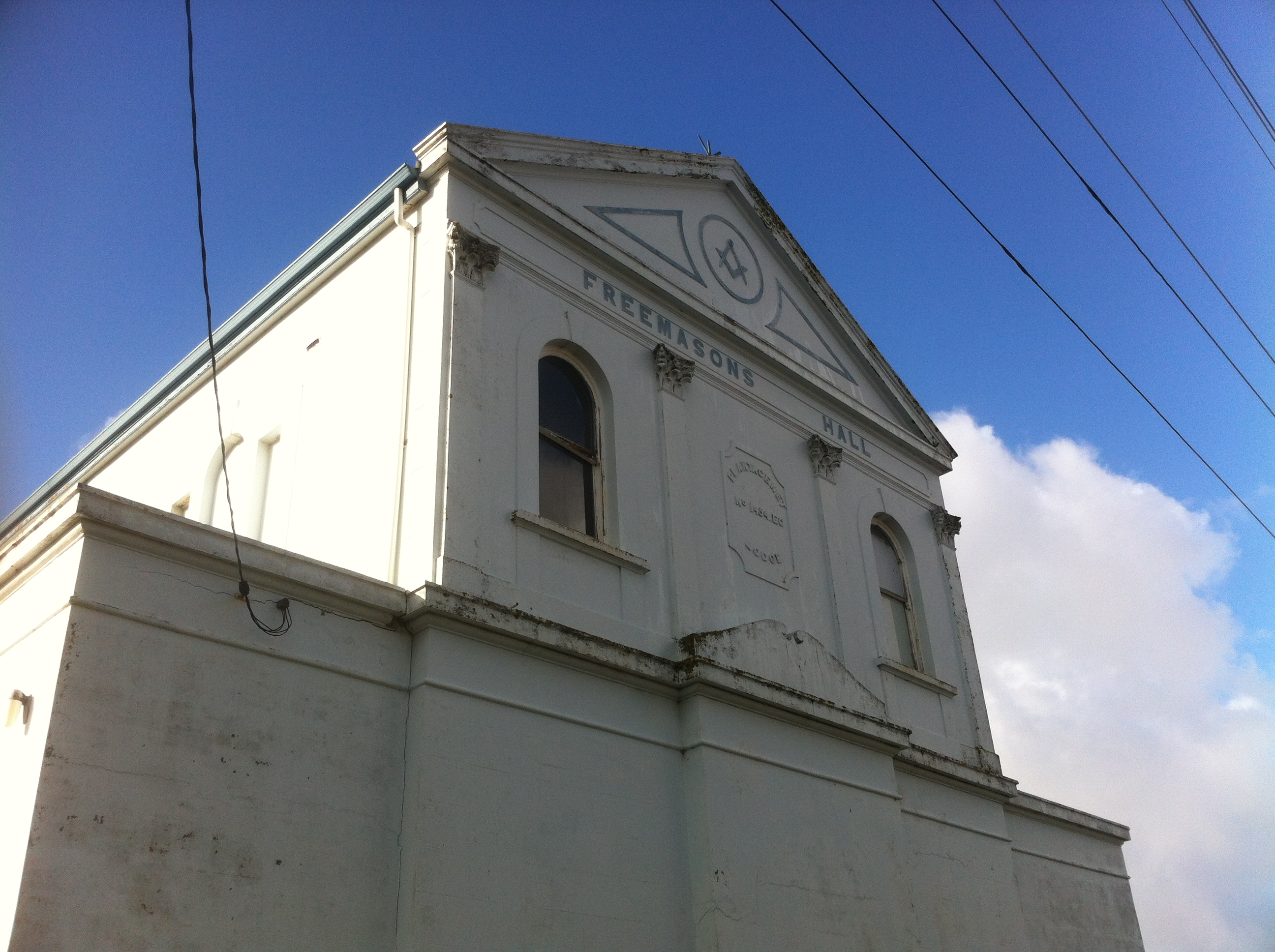
Albany Masonic Hall

- Albany Masonic Hall, Albany (1903) – listed on the Western Australia Heritage Register
- Masonic Temple, 134 Burt Street, Kalgoorlie-Boulder (1901–1902) – built in the Federation Academic Classical style
- Masonic Temple, 26 Egan Street, Kalgoorlie-Boulder (1899) – pink sandstone building built in the Federation Academic Classical style
- Urwin's Store, Toodyay – the local lodge rented the upstairs rooms from 1899 to 1924 before moving to its current premises

=== Tasmania ===
- Bothwell Masonic Hall, Bothwell
- Deloraine Masonic Hall, Deloraine
- Devonport Masonic Hall, Devonport
- Franklin Masonic Hall, Franklin
- Glenorchy Masonic Hall, Glenorchy
- Hobart Masonic Centre, Hobart
- Launceston Masonic Centre, Launceston
- Lindisfarne Masonic Hall, Lindisfarne
- New Norfolk Masonic Hall, New Norfolk
- Newstead Masonic Hall, Newstead
- North West Masonic Centre, Hillcrest
- Oatlands Masonic Hall, Oatlands
- Old Town Hall, Ross
- Pembroke Masonic Hall, Sorell
- Queenstown Masonic Hall, Queenstown
- Scottsdale Masonic Hall, Scottsdale
- Sheffield Masonic Hall, Sheffield
- Wynyard Masonic Hall, Wynyard

== Bermuda ==
- State House, St. George's - The oldest stone building in Bermuda, it housed Bermuda's Parliament from 1620 until 1815, when the capital was relocated to Hamilton. Since 1815 it has been leased in perpetuity to a Masonic Lodge.

== Canada ==
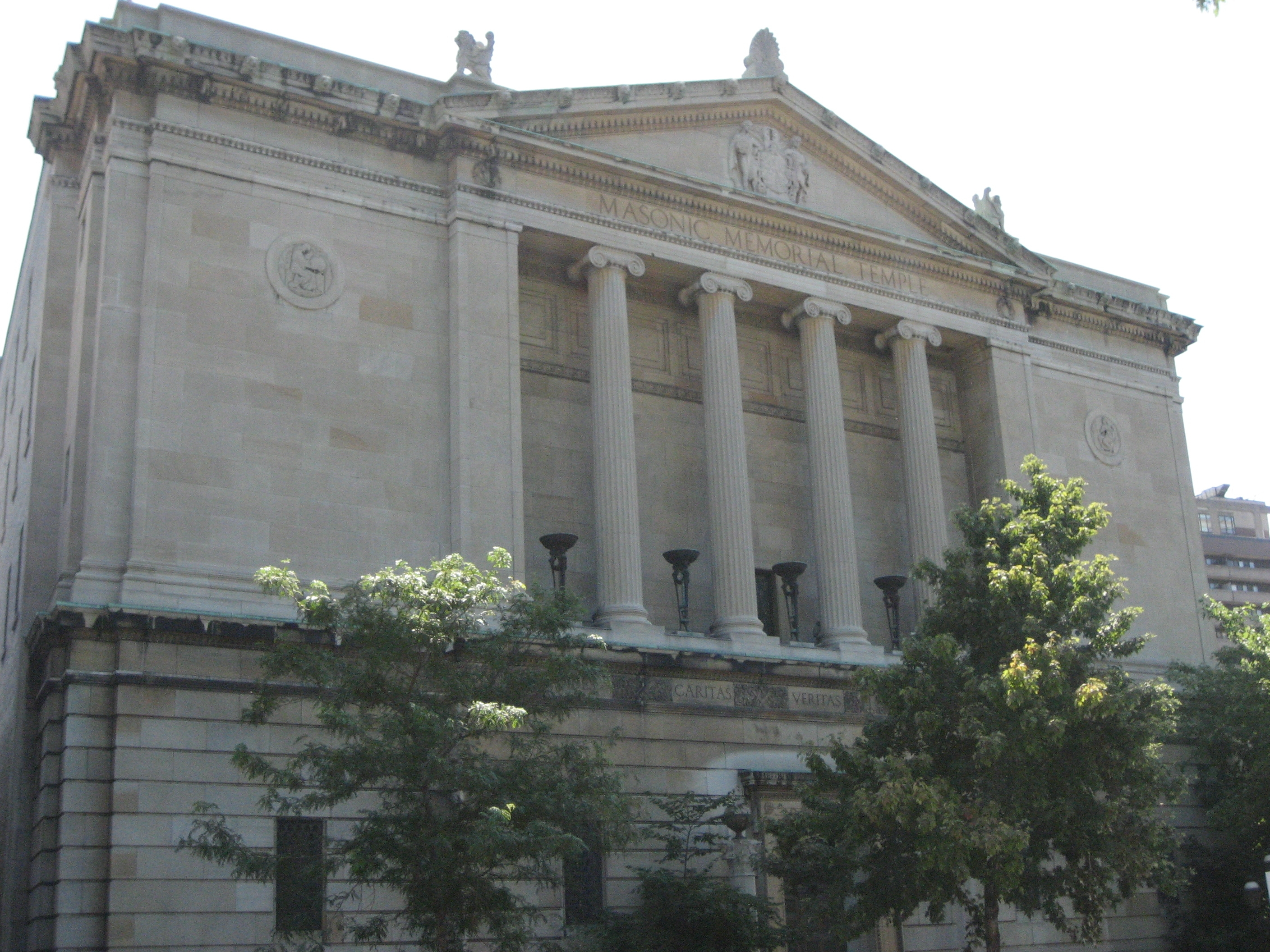
Montreal Masonic Memorial Temple, in Quebec, Canada

=== Alberta ===
- Masonic Hall Museum, on "1905 St" in Fort Edmonton Park, Edmonton

=== Newfoundland and Labrador ===
- Masonic Temple (St. John's) - Designated a Registered Heritage Structure by the Heritage Foundation of Newfoundland and Labrador in April 1995. The building is currently owned by Spirit of Newfoundland, and used mainly by artists of all artistic genres, with the core business being dinner and show.

=== Ontario ===
- Masonic Temple in Toronto — Added to the City of Toronto Heritage Property Inventory in 1974, and designated under the Ontario Heritage Act in 1997. Originally constructed as a Masonic Hall, the building has changed hands a number of times. From the 1960s through the 1990s, it housed a succession of live music clubs. Later in the 1990s, it was the home of Open Mike with Mike Bullard, and was one of CTV Toronto's news bureaus. From March 2006, the building became the broadcast home of the new MTV Canada. On June 17, 2013, the building was purchased by the Info-Tech Research Group. Info-Tech announced that its plans for the building include staging an annual charity rock concert in the auditorium.

=== Quebec ===
- Montreal Masonic Memorial Temple in Montreal — Prominent Beaux-Arts style building completed in 1930, a National Historic Site.

== Denmark ==
- Freemasons' Hall, Copenhagen

== Hong Kong ==
- Zetland Hall is the headquarters of the District Grand Lodge of Hong Kong and the Far East. Hong Kong Freemasons built the first Zetland Hall in 1865 and used it until it was destroyed in an air raid in 1944. In 1949 it was replaced by the second Zetland Hall.

== India ==
- Goshamal Baradari, in Hyderabad, India, built in 1682, and donated to the fraternity in 1872 by the Nizam of Hyderabad,
- St. John's Masonic Lodge & Temple in Secunderabad, built circa 1820s by British Army officers.

== Liberia ==
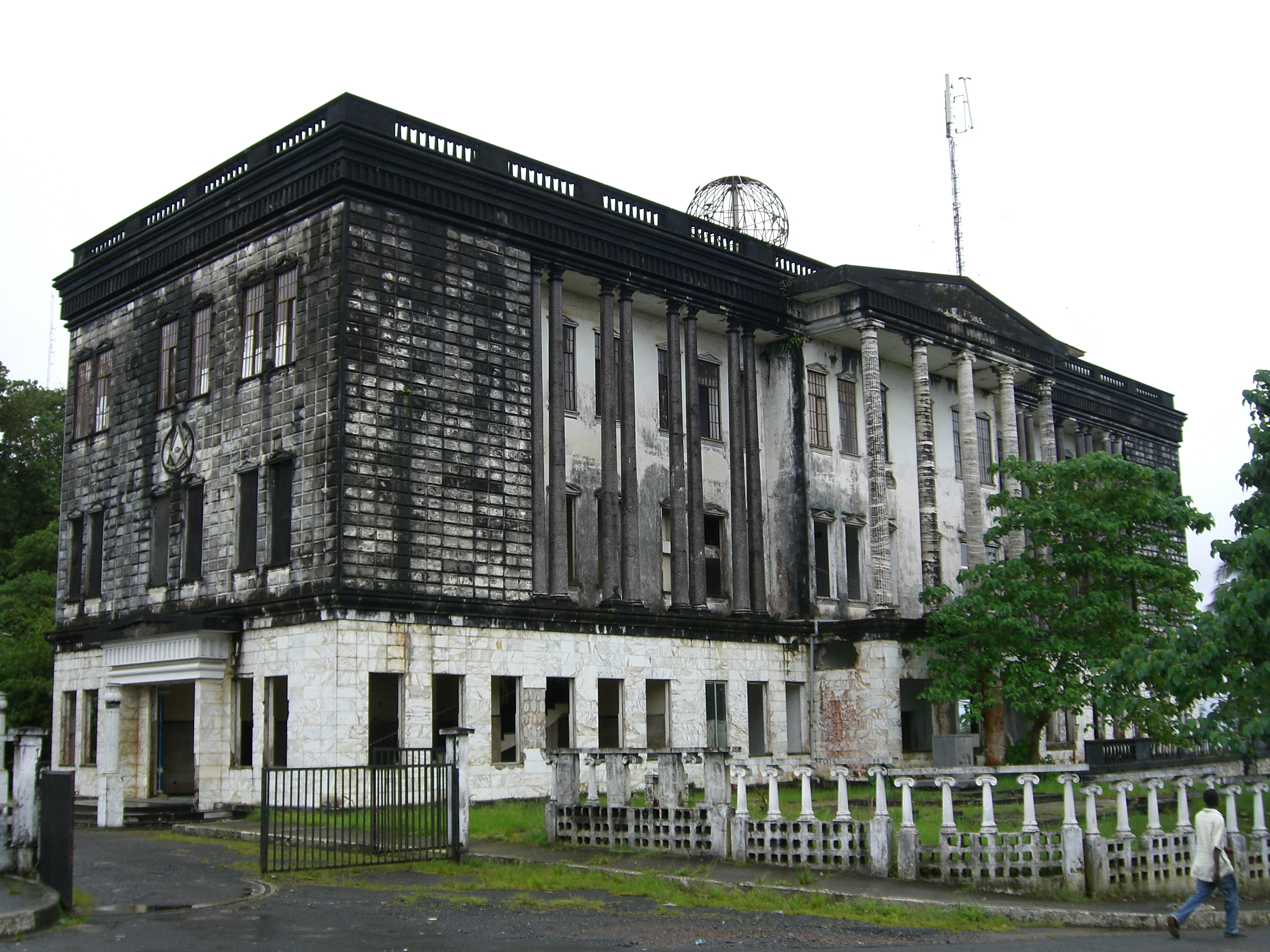
Former Masonic lodge building in Monrovia, 2006

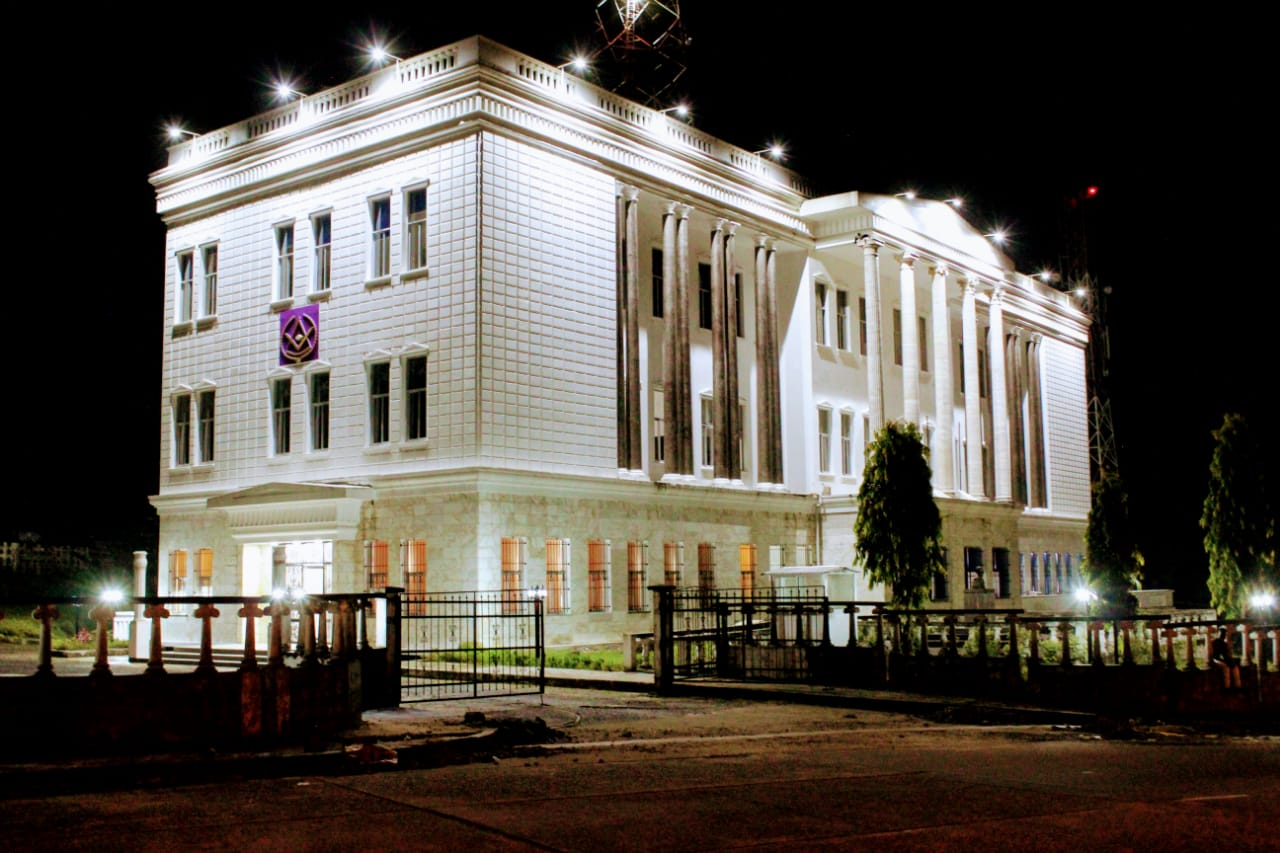
The renovation of Liberia's Grand Masonic Temple was completed in 2018.

- Monrovia - During the First Liberian Civil War, the Grand Masonic Temple in Monrovia was the scene of many battles. and its ruins became home to 8000 squatters. The Masons managed to evict them by 2005 and the building was renovated in 2018.

== Malaysia ==
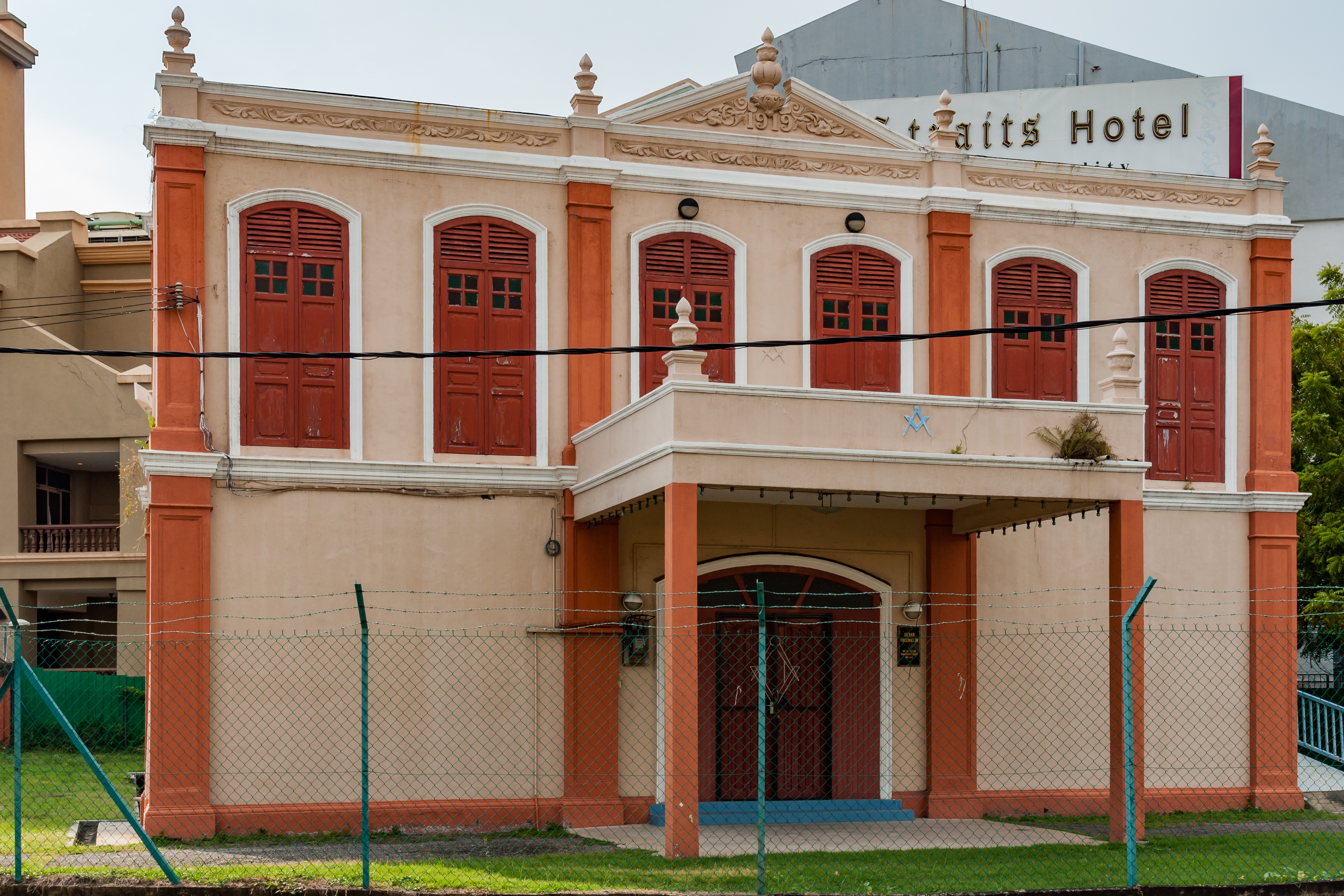
Freemason Hall, Melaka, Malaysia

In 1977, Malaysia had 55 lodges and 2,984 "expert" members. Halls include:

- Freemason Hall, 74 Jalan Chan Koon Cheng, Melaka
- Penang Masonic Temple, in Penang

== New Zealand ==
- Masonic Lodge, Poutu Road, Aratapu. Built in the early 1900s, this was a category 2 historic place (#3869). Lost to fire during 2003.
- Arrow Kilwinning Lodge, 9 Wiltshire Street, Arrowtown. Category 1 historic place (#2110), listed 10 December 2010.
- Cromwell Kilwinning Lodge No 98, 69 Melmore Terrace, Cromwell. Built in 1900. Category 2 historic place (#2130), listed 22 June 2007.
- Masonic Hall, 21 Kimbolton Road, Feilding. Built during 1897–98. A category 2 historic place (#1230). A 1913 renovation added an Edwardian Free Classical style facade designed by C. Tilleard Natusch & Sons. Lost to redevelopment during 2014.
- Masonic Lodge, 132 Percival Street, Rangiora. Brick, concrete and iron building with a facing of Oamaru Stone, this was a Category 2 historic place (#3785). Damaged in Canterbury earthquakes, demolished in 2013.

== Pakistan ==
- Masonic Temple, Lahore; meeting place for Lodge of Hope and Perseverance No. 782
- Freemasons Lodge Building, Karachi. Built by the Freemason's Trust before World War I; now used by the Sindh Wildlife Department Conservator; renovations began in circa 2008.

== Philippines ==
=== Metro Manila ===
- Plaridel Masonic Temple, Gen. Luna St, Paco, Manila
- Masonic Temple at Escolta, Manila, on the Pasig River, apparently the tallest building in the "Wall Street of the Philippines" area in the 1910s.
- Jacobo Zobel Masonic Temple, Makati
- Capitol Masonic Temple, Quezon City

=== Visayas ===
- Aklan Masonic Temple, Kalibo, Aklan
- Bacolod Masonic Temple, Bacolod, Negros Occidental
- Cebu Masonic Temple, Cebu City, Cebu
- Iloilo Masonic Temple, Iloilo City, Iloilo

=== Mindanao ===
- Maguindanao Masonic Temple, Cagayan de Oro
- Kitanglay Masonic Temple, Gimampang, Misamis Oriental

== Singapore ==
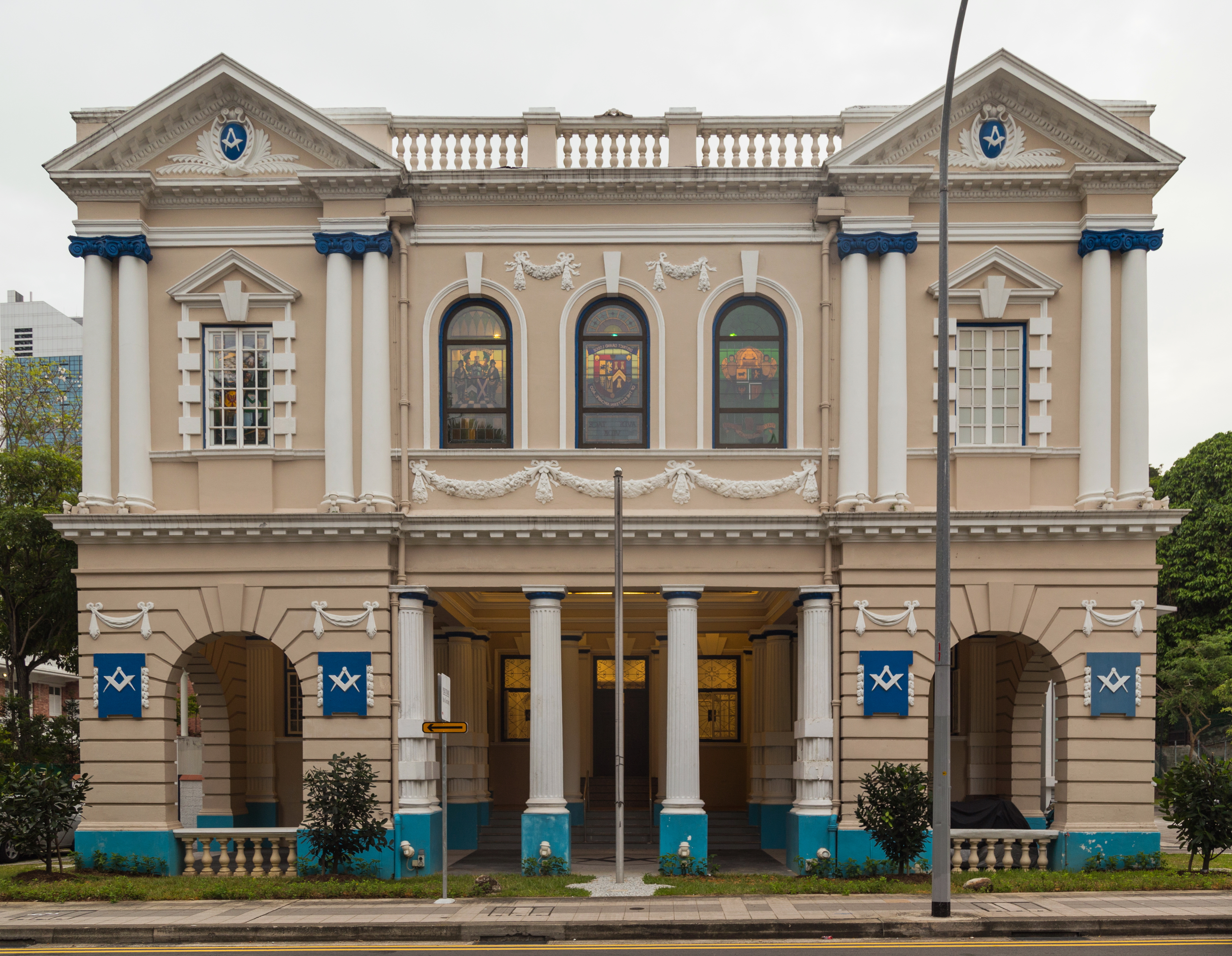
Masonic Hall, Singapore in 2016

- Masonic Hall, 23A Coleman Street, Central Region English Renaissance style,

== Spain ==
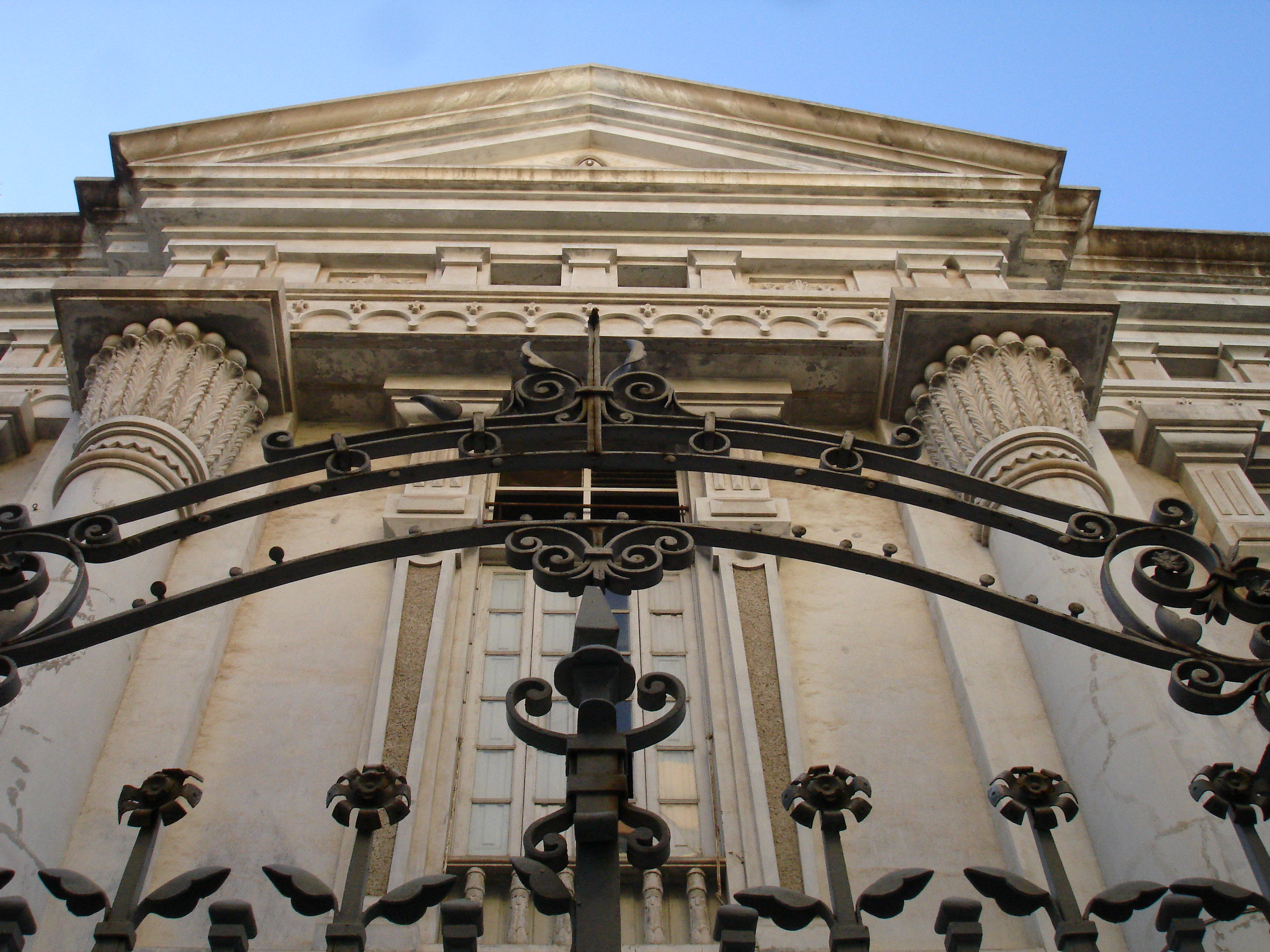
Masonic Temple of Santa Cruz de Tenerife, Spain

- Masonic Temple of Santa Cruz de Tenerife, Canary Islands

== Sri Lanka ==
- Victoria Masonic Temple, Colombo

== United Kingdom ==
=== England ===
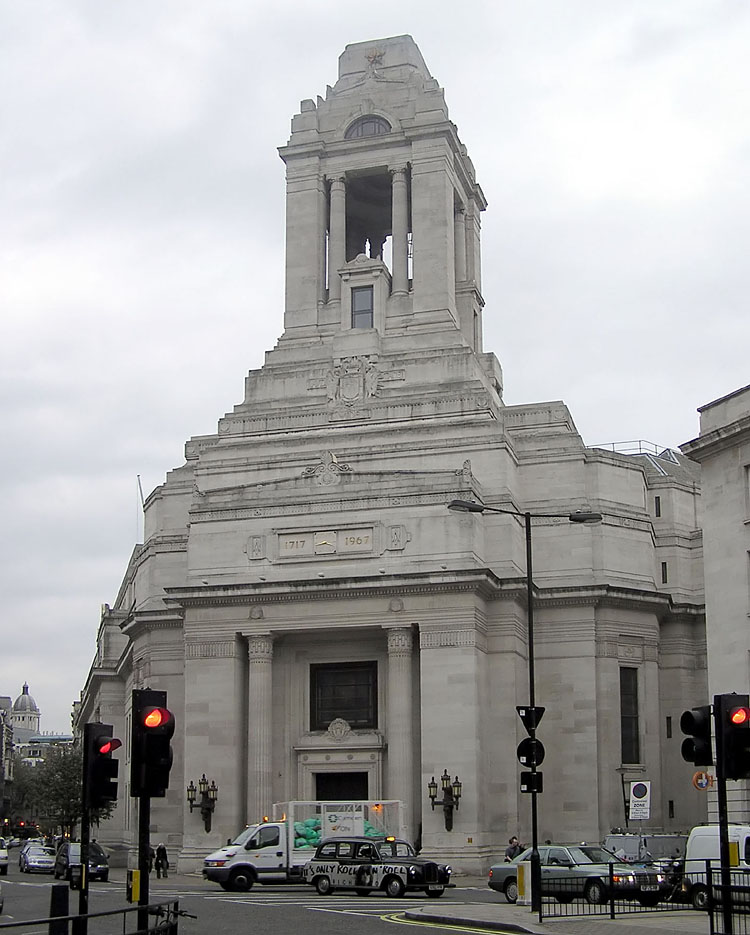
Freemason's Hall, London

- London
  - Freemasons' Hall, London is the home of the United Grand Lodge of England
  - Mark Masons' Hall
  - Headquarters, Order of Women Freemasons, a 19th-century building at 27 Pembridge Gardens, Notting Hill, which is a Grade II listed building, that since 1924 has been home of Order of Women Freemasons
  - Hexagon House, Surbiton. Headquarters of the British Federation of Le Droit Humain, The International Order of Freemasonry for Men and Women, a Co-Masonic order.
- Cheltenham Masonic Hall Grade II* listed.
- The Cloisters, Letchworth is a Grade II* listed building.
- The Hanging Chapel in Langport is a Grade I listed building and a scheduled monument that became a masonic hall in 1891.
- Old Orchard Street Theatre, Bath Theatre and church which became a masonic hall in 1865.
- Phoenix Lodge, Sunderland. A Grade I listed building with the longest continuous usage of a Masonic meeting place in the world.
- Royal Masonic School for Boys in Bushey, Hertfordshire.
- Royal Masonic School in Rickmansworth, Hertfordshire. (Chapel is Grade II listed).

=== Scotland ===
- Freemasons' Hall, Edinburgh. Headquarters of the Grand Lodge of Scotland.
- The building used by Lodge Mother Kilwinning Kilwinning, Ayrshire, consecrated in 1893, includes a museum of Masonic artefacts. The lodge traces its history to the building of Kilwinning Abbey, circa 1140. The current lodge building replaced a lodge building that was erected in 1779.
- Pollokshields Burgh Hall in Glasgow, meeting place for Lodge Pollok, Pollokshields No. 772.
