= William Stanford =

William Stanford may refer to:

- William Stanford (sculptor), Australian sculptor
- William Stanford (judge), (1509 – 1558) English politician and judge
- William Bedell Stanford, Irish classical scholar and politician
