= Downtown Hollister Historic District =

Historic district in California, United States

- U.S. National Register of Historic Places
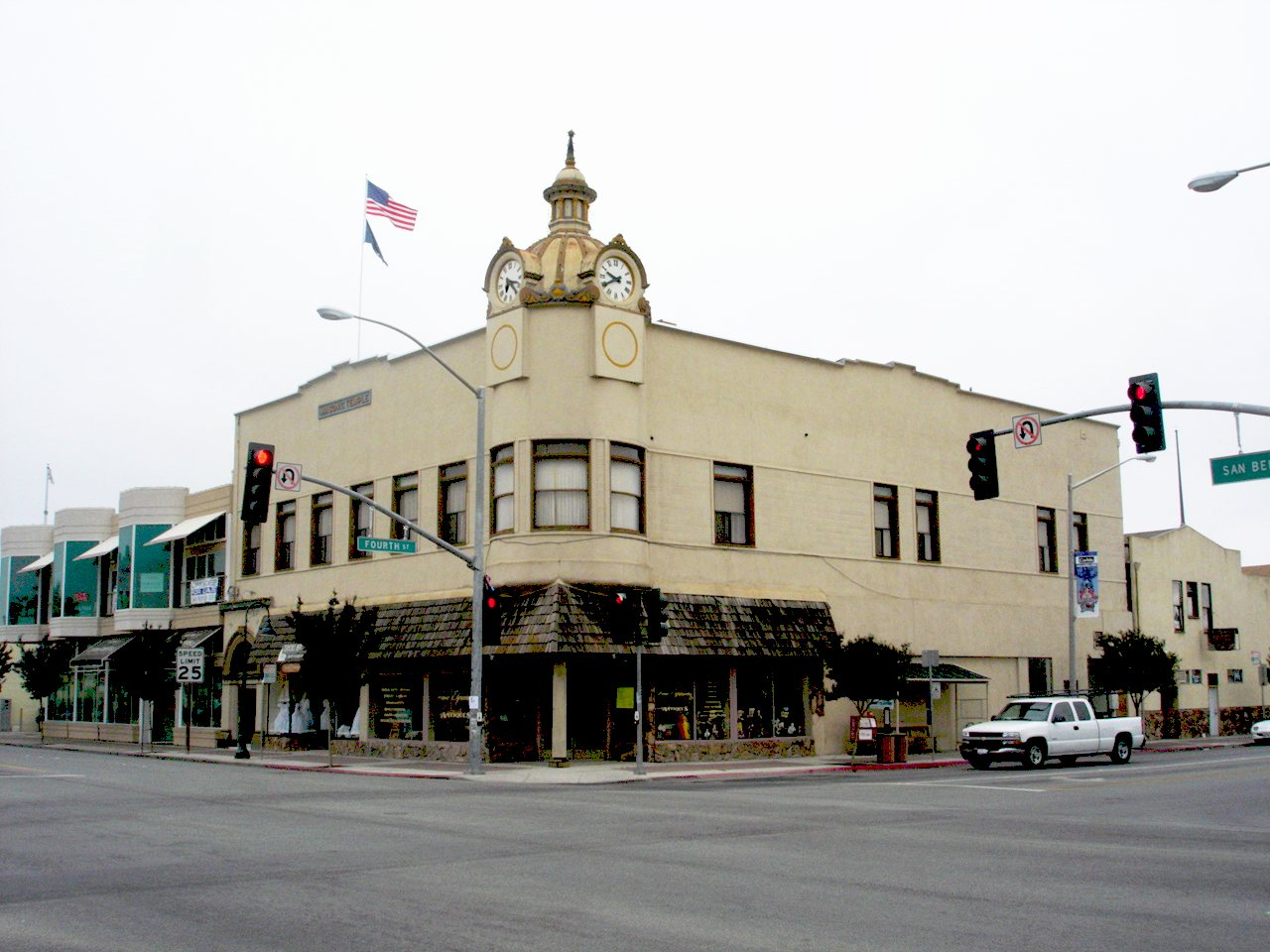
- Masonic Temple building

- Location within California
- Location: Roughly bounded by Fourth, East, South and Monterey Sts., Hollister, California
- Coordinates: 36°51′00″N 121°24′03″W
- Area: 22 acres (8.9 ha)
- Architectural style: Italianate, Mission/spanish Revival, Spanish Colonial Revival
- NRHP reference No.: 92000974
- Added to NRHP: August 14, 1992

The Downtown Hollister Historic District, in Hollister, California, is a historic district which was listed on the National Register of Historic Places in 1992.

The district includes 53 contributing buildings in a 22 acres (8.9 ha) area roughly bounded by Fourth, East, South and Monterey Streets. It also included 29 non-contributing buildings and 10 parcels that were empty in 1992. It includes Monterey Street and cross-streets from Fourth to South.

Its contributing buildings include:

- Masonic Temple (c.1908), 355 San Benito St., has a domed cupola, a Masonic building
- a Carnegie library
- 135 5th Street, a former post office building, built around 1935 in Spanish Colonial Revival style.
