= Albany Masonic Hall =

Masonic temple in Albany, Western Australia

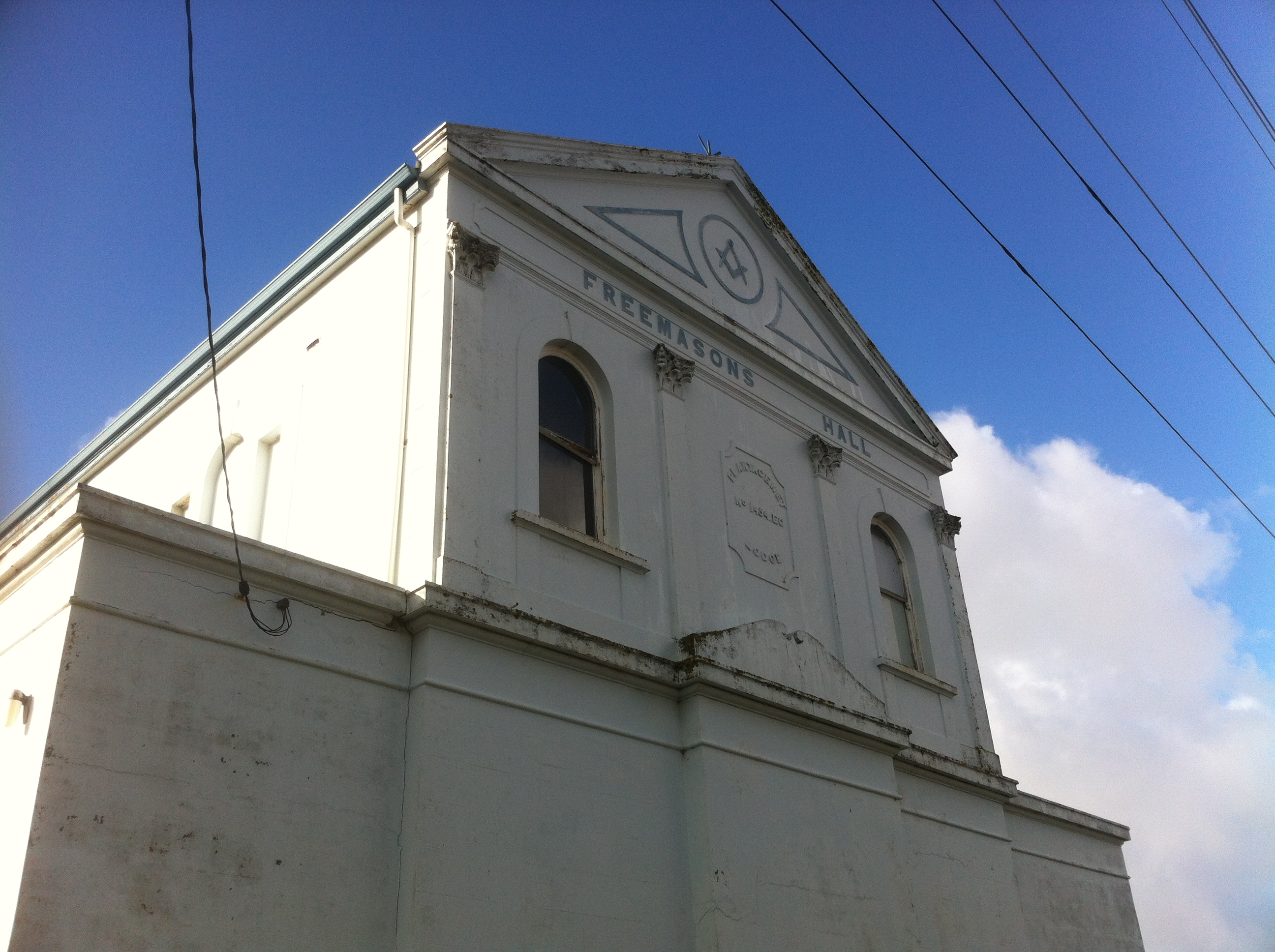
- Albany Masonic Hall main facade

General information
- Type: Masonic Hall
- Location: Albany, Western Australia
- Coordinates: 35.0254°S 117.8876°E

Western Australia Heritage Register
- Type: State Registered Place
- Designated: 26 August 2008
- Reference no.: 23

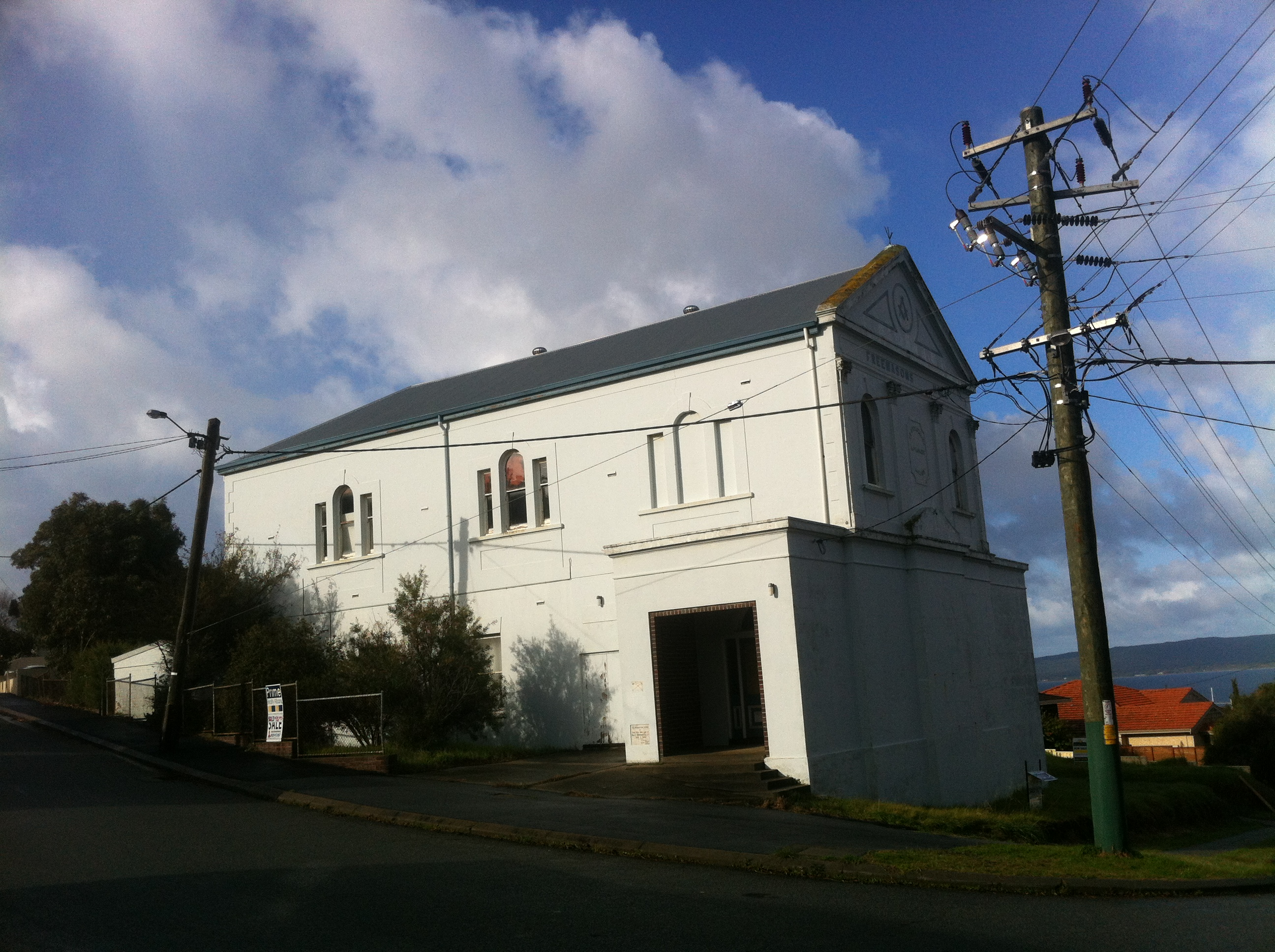
Albany Masonic Hall side view

The Albany Masonic Hall, also known as Plantagenet Lodge, is a heritage listed building located at 58–60 Spencer Street, on the corner of Earl Street, on the south western slopes of Mount Clarence in Albany in the Great Southern region of Western Australia.

The Albany Lodge, the Lodge of St John, was the first Masonic lodge to erect a hall in Western Australia. It is also the only one still under the English Constitution. The land was bought in 1872 for the sum of £30. The first hall was built on the site in 1873 but was demolished in 1903 to make way for the new hall. The first hall was a tall and narrow building two storeys high. It faced on to Earl St with a door and two sash windows on the ground floor and three windows above. The first meeting was held there in 1873. The foundation stone was laid in July 1903, after the brethren met and marched from Scots Church to the site and then buried a phial containing a brief history of the lodge.

The hall is situated on a 2,266 square metres (0.23 ha) block. The building has an elevated position, has elements of a simple Federation Warehouse style, gable roof with freemason symbol on gable, arched windows on façade and emphasised piers with decorative top motifs.

== See also ==
- List of places on the State Register of Heritage Places in the City of Albany
