= Grand Lodge of the Philippines =

Philippines freemasonry organization

- The Most Worshipful Grand Lodge of Free and Accepted Masons of the Philippines
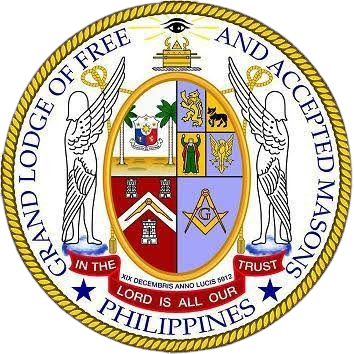
- Headquarters: New Plaridel Masonic Temple
- Location: Manila, Philippines
- Region served: Philippines; China (formerly); Japan; South Korea; Marianas Islands; South Vietnam (formerly)
- Grand Master: MW Robert Joseph S. Moran, Jr.
- Website: grandlodge.ph

The Most Worshipful Grand Lodge of Free and Accepted Masons of the Philippines is the organizational body based on the Philippines that governs Freemasonry. It currently has its offices at the Plaridel Masonic Temple, a historic building in Ermita, Manila.

== History ==
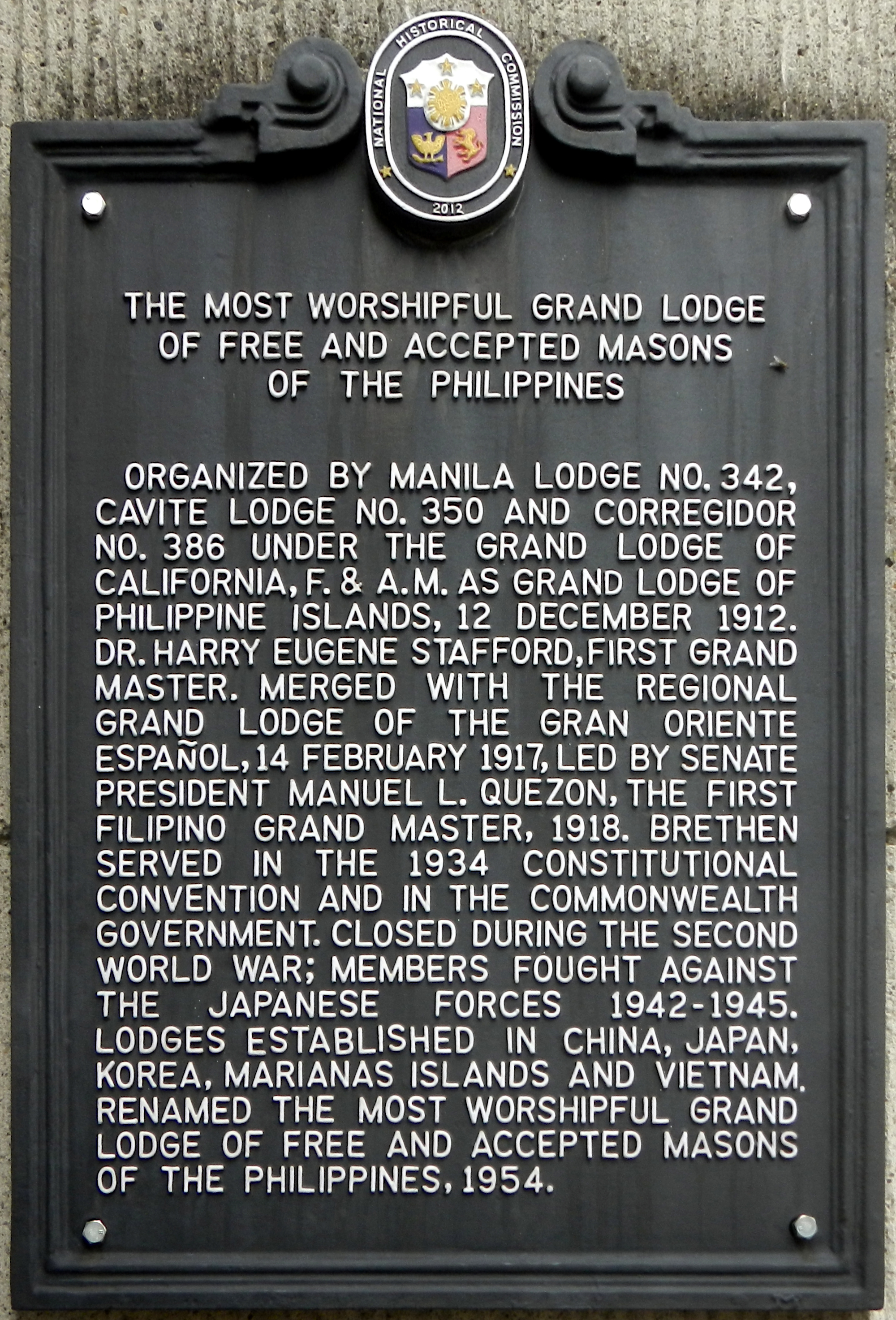
Historical marker installed in 2012

In 1912, three American Lodges owing allegiance to the Most Worshipful Grand Lodge of California were already established in the Philippines. Those were Manila Lodge No. 342, Cavite Lodge No. 350 and Corregidor Lodge No. 386. The three lodges held a meeting on November 17, 1912 to fix a date for the First Convention of the delegates selected and to be selected for the purpose of considering the organization of a Grand Lodge.

The Grand Lodge was officially formed on December 19, 1912. At first, this Grand Lodge remained a Regional Grand Lodge, convoking its own Grand Assembly in 1915. Throughout 1915 and 1916 it was engaged with correspondence with the Grande Oriente Español in Spain, who also chartered lodges in the Philippines. The long process of establishing the proper agreements finished in February 1917. The American Grand Lodge Constitution was used as a basis, keeping in mind issues such as equality of all races and working languages for ceremonies. In the same month a group of 27 lodges still under the Grande Oriente Español elected to affiliate under the Philippine Grand Lodge and Grand Officers were elected.

== Grand Masters ==
The current Grand Master of the Free and Accepted Masons of the Philippines is MW Robert Joseph S. Moran, Jr. being the 108th Grand Master.

Below is the list of the past Grand Masters in descending order:

- 2025 – MW Raul E. Canon, Jr.
- 2024 – MW Ariel T. Cayanan
- 2023 – MW Don T. Ramas-Uypitching
- 2022 – MW Johnny T. Pimentel
- 2021 – MW Rolen C. Paulino
- 2019 – MW Agapito S. Suan, Jr.
- 2018 – MW Romeo S. Momo
- 2017 – MW Abraham N. Tolentino
- 2016 – MW Voltaire T. Gazmin
- 2015 – MW Tomas G. Rentoy III
- 2014 – MW Alan La Madrid Purisima
- 2013 – MW Juanito G. Espino, Jr.
- 2012 – MW Santiago T. Gabionza, Jr.
- 2011 – MW Juanito P. Abergas
- 2010 – MW Avelino I. Razon, Jr.
- 2009 – MW Peter U. Lim Lo Suy
- 2008 – MW Pacifico B. Aniag
- 2007 – MW Jaime Y. Gonzales
- 2006 – MW Romy A. Yu
- 2005 – MW Hermogenes E. Ebdane, Jr.
- 2004 – MW Roberto Q. Pagotan
- 2003 – MW Ricardo P. Galvez
- 2002 – MW Eugenio S. Labitoria
- 2001 – MW Napoleon A. Soriano
- 2000 – MW Oscar V. Bunyi
- 1999 – MW Franklin J. Demonteverde
- 1998 – MW Enrique L. Locsin
- 1997 – MW Leon Angel P. Bañez, Jr.
- 1996 – MW Jose Percival L. Adiong
- 1995 – MW Danilo D. Angeles
- 1994 – MW Pablo C. Ko, Jr.
- 1993 – MW Rizal D. Aportadera
- 1992 – MW Agustin V. Mateo
- 1991 – MW Jose Reyes Guerrero
- 1990 – MW John L. Choa
- 1989 – MW Juan C. Nabong, Jr.
- 1988 – MW Raymundo N. Beltran
- 1987 – MW Teodorico V. Baldonado
- 1986 – MW Reynold S. Fajardo
- 1985 – MW Pedro W. Guerzon
- 1984 – MW Reynato S. Puno
- 1983 – MW Rosendo C. Herrera
- 1982 – MW Rudyardo V. Bunda
- 1981 – MW Simeon Rene Lacson
- 1980 – MW Manuel D. Mandac
- 1979 – MW Jolly R. Bugarin
- 1978 – MW Desiderio Dalisay Sr.
- 1977 – MW Calixto O. Zaldivar
- 1976 – MW Jose L. Araneta
- 1975 – MW Teodoro V. Kalaw, Jr.
- 1974 – MW John O. Wallace
- 1973 – MW Ruperto S. Demonteverde, Sr.
- 1972 – MW William C. Councell
- 1971 – MW Damaso C. Tria
- 1970 – MW Edgar L. Shepley
- 1969 – MW Manuel M. Crudo
- 1968 – MW Joseph E. Schon
- 1967 – MW Raymond E. Wilmarth
- 1966 – MW Mariano Q. Tinio
- 1965 – MW Serafin L. Teves
- 1964 – MW Charles S. Mosebrook
- 1963 – MW Pedro M. Gimenez
- 1962 – MW William H. Quasha
- 1961 – MW Juan S. Alano
- 1960 – MW Luther B. Bewley
- 1959 – MW Macario M. Ofilada
- 1958 – MW Howard R. Hick
- 1957 – MW Vicente Orosa
- 1956 – MW Clinton F. Carlson
- 1955 – MW Camilo Osías
- 1954 – MW Werner P. Schetelig
- 1953 – MW Mauro O. Baradi
- 1952 – MW Sydney M. Austin
- 1951 – MW Cenon S. Cervantes
- 1950 – MW Clifford C. Bennett
- 1949 – MW Esteban Munarriz
- 1948 – MW Albert J. Brazee, Jr.
- 1947 – MW Emilio P. Virata
- 1946 – MW Michael Goldenberg
- 1941 – MW John Robert McFie, Jr.
- 1940 – MW Jose de los Reyes
- 1939 – MW Clark James
- 1938 – MW José Abad Santos
- 1937 – MW Joseph Alley
- 1936 – MW Conrado Benitez
- 1935 – MW Samuel Hawthorne
- 1934 – MW Manuel Camus
- 1933 – MW Stanton Youngberg
- 1932 – MW Antonio Gonzalez Sr.
- 1931 – MW William W. Larkin
- 1930 – MW Vicente Carmona
- 1929 – MW Seldon O'Brien
- 1928 – MW Teodoro M. Kalaw Sr.
- 1927 – MW Joseph Schmidt
- 1926 – MW Francisco A. Delgado
- 1925 – MW Christian W. Rosenstock
- 1924 – MW Wenceslao Trinidad
- 1923 – MW Frederic H. Stevens
- 1922 – MW Quíntin Paredes
- 1921 – MW Edwin E. Elser
- 1920 – MW Rafael Palma
- 1919 – MW Milton Earle Springer
- 1918 – MW Manuel Luis Quezon
- 1917 – MW William Hendrickson Taylor
- 1915 – MW George Rogers Harvey
- 1914 – MW Newton C. Comfort
- 1913 – MW Harry Eugene Stafford
