= Masonic Temple, Monrovia =

Building in Monrovia, Liberia

Coordinates: 6°19′05.4″N 10°48′48.4″W

The Masonic Temple, also known as the Grand Masonic Temple, is a Masonic building in central Monrovia, Liberia. It is one of the most prominent buildings associated with Freemasonry in the country and has long been regarded as the principal headquarters of Liberian Freemasonry.

The building stands at the western end of Benson Street in the Mamba Point area of Monrovia. It became especially associated with the social and political influence of the Masonic Order of Liberia, whose membership before the 1980 coup was closely connected with the Americo-Liberian elite and the ruling True Whig Party.

== History ==
Freemasonry in Liberia developed in close connection with the Americo-Liberian settler community. The Grand Lodge of Liberia was founded in 1867 and became one of the most important fraternal organizations in the country. One of the early lodges, St. John’s Lodge No. 3, was founded on Carey Street in Monrovia in 1857 and later joined Oriental Lodge No. 1 of Monrovia and St. Paul Lodge No. 2 of Clay-Ashland in forming the Grand Lodge of Liberia.

The Masonic order became a central institution of the Americo-Liberian upper class. By the mid-1970s, the Grand Lodge reportedly comprised 17 subordinate lodges. Before the 1980 coup, many leading officials of the True Whig Party and senior members of Liberia’s political class were Freemasons, and the order was widely perceived as a place where social status, political influence and elite networking overlapped. This concentration of influence contributed to resentment among non-members and among Liberians outside the Americo-Liberian elite.

The present temple building became the permanent home of several lodges in Monrovia. According to the Grand Lodge, St. John’s Lodge No. 3 and other lodges moved into the Masonic Temple after its completion in 1967. The building was designed as a monumental lodge and meeting place, with a columned façade, Masonic symbolism and a prominent globe on the roof.

The position of the Masonic order changed abruptly after the military coup of 1980. President William R. Tolbert Jr., himself a Freemason and Grand Master of the Liberian Grand Lodge, was killed during the coup, and the new regime under Samuel Doe banned Masonic activity for a time. Masonic activity was later restored, but the order never regained the unchallenged position it had held during the True Whig era.

== Civil war and restoration ==
During the First Liberian Civil War and the subsequent years of instability, the temple was repeatedly damaged, looted and occupied. The building become burned-out, with squatters living inside by the early 2000s. The Masons managed to evict them by 2005.

The building was subsequently renovated. Images of the temple after renovation show the restoration of its exterior and the return of the prominent globe above the main façade. By the late 2010s, the structure had again become a visible landmark of central Monrovia and a symbol of the continued presence of Freemasonry in Liberia.

== Architecture ==
The temple is a large building with a symmetrical façade and tall columns. Its design reflects the ceremonial and symbolic character of Masonic architecture. The façade includes Masonic emblems, while the roof is crowned by a globe, formerly described as gilded. Owing to its size and prominent location, the building is one of the best-known architectural landmarks of Benson Street and central Monrovia.

== Gallery ==
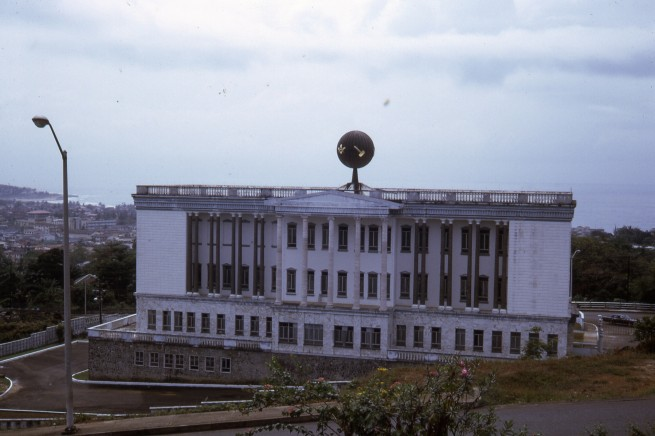
Before the civil war

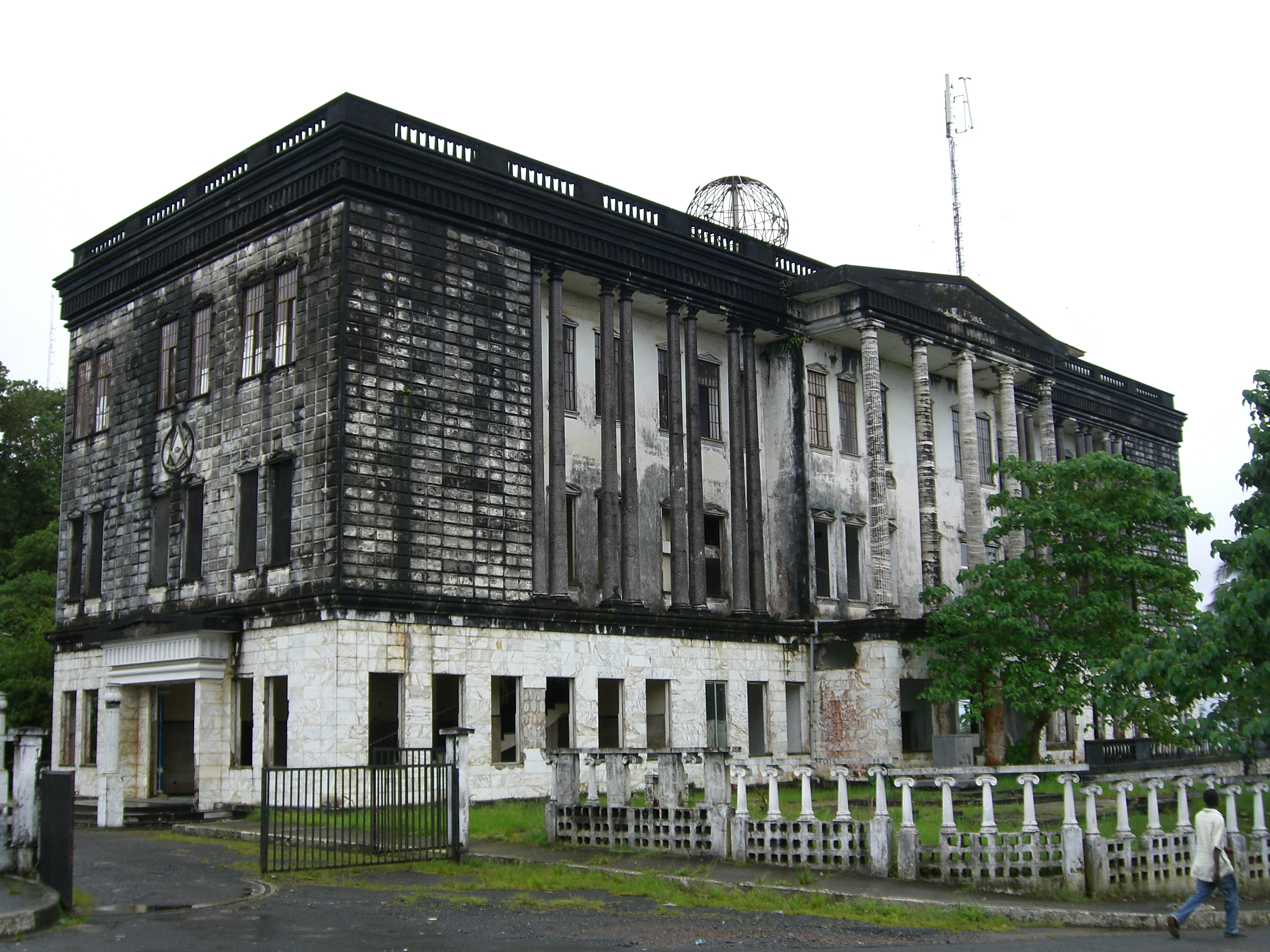
Around 2006

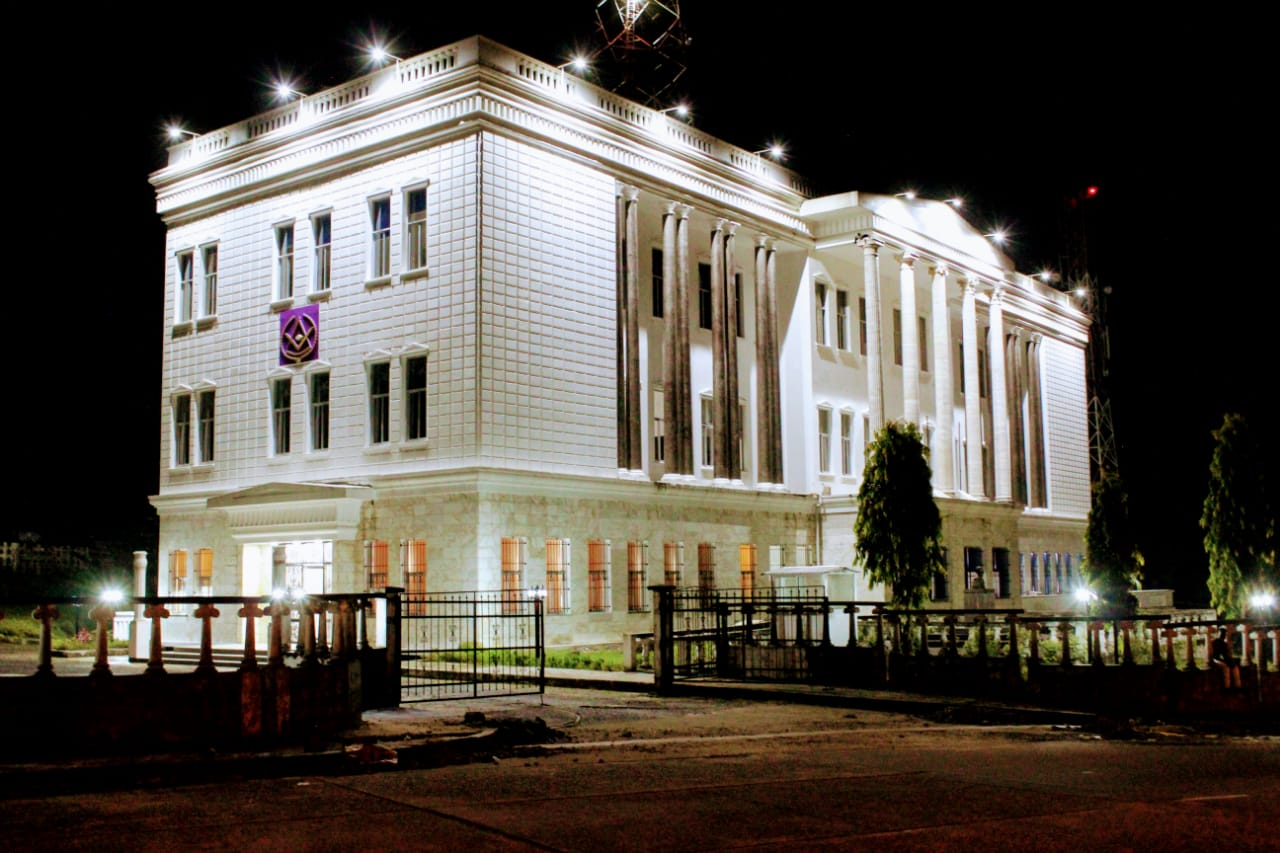
Renovated, around 2018

== See also ==
- History of Liberia
