= Emulation Hall =

Heritage-listed hall in Melbourne, Victoria, Australia

- Location of the hall in Greater Metropolitan Melbourne
- Alternative names: Chatham Hall

General information
- Status: Completed
- Type: Masonic lodge (1928–2013); Function venue (since c. 2017)
- Architectural style: Inter-War Egyptian Revival
- Location: 3 Rochester Road, Canterbury, City of Boroondara, Melbourne, Victoria, Australia
- Coordinates: 37°49′23″S 145°04′52″E
- Year built: 1927–1928
- Completed: 1928; 98 years ago
- Inaugurated: 12 May 1928 (memorial stone)
- Owner: United Grand Lodge of Victoria (1927–2014); Noel Crombie anor (since 2014– )

Technical details
- Material: Rendered bricks; corrugated iron; wrought iron; timber
- Grounds: 792 m^{2} (8,530 sq ft) (in 2019)

Design and construction
- Architecture firm: Dunstan Reynolds & Partners

Victorian Heritage Register
- Official name: Emulation Hall
- Type: Registered place
- Delisted: 8 March 2012
- Reference no.: VHR H2298
- Heritage overlay no.: HO561
- Category: Community facilities

The Emulation Hall, also known as Chatham Hall, is a former Masonic lodge building, now function centre, located at 3 Rochester Road in Canterbury, in the City of Boroondara, in the inner eastern suburbs of Melbourne, in Victoria, Australia. Built in 1928 on the traditional lands of the Wurundjeri people, the hall was added to the Victorian Heritage Register on 8 March 2012 in recognition of its architectural, historical, and aesthetic significance.

== History ==
=== Freemasonry in Victoria ===
The first lodge meeting in Victoria was held in 1839. The United Grand Lodge of Victoria was established in 1889, bringing together lodges which had previously worked under separate constitutions and this resulted in increased numbers of suburban lodges. A large increase in the popularity of freemasonry in Victoria in the early 1920s resulted in the formation of many suburban and country lodges and the necessity for meeting places. More than twelve masonic halls were built in Victoria between 1922 and 1925, including halls at Brunswick, Greensborough, Ivanhoe, Oakleigh, Prahran, Avoca, Colac, Kaniva, Maffra, Nagambie, Wycheproof and Yarrawonga.

=== Canterbury site ===
Founded in 1889, Emulation Lodge No. 141 met in public halls in Box Hill, Canterbury, and Surrey Hills, before constructing the Rochester Road lodge. Emulation Hall was constructed between 1927 and 1928 by the Freemasons for the established Emulation Lodge. The masonic temple was designed by architects Dunstan Reynolds & Partners, whose principal partner, Bennet Dunstan Reynolds, was a freemason. The hall was built to provide a facility for both the Freemasons and the local community. Since its construction Emulation Hall has provided a temple for a number of lodges that were sponsored by Emulation Lodge and also provided a public venue for club meetings and functions such as dances.

Emulation Lodge disbanded in the 1990s and one of its sponsor lodges, Chatham Lodge No. 459, acquired the temple; until that lodge was disbanded in 2013. The Freemasons sold the building was sold in 2015 for $1.4 million, purchased by Noel Crombie, a former member of Split Enz, with business partners, Nicole Fraser and Sally Mill, who restored the property as a functions venue, prior to listing for sale in 2019. However, the property did not sell and was re-listed in 2021 with expectations of c.$3 million.

== Description ==
Designed in the Inter-War Egyptian Revival style, Emulation Hall is a large two-storey rendered brick building with small window openings and a concealed corrugated iron roof. The symmetrical front facade is in the form of an Egyptian temple pylon, with two battered towers flanking a recessed bay and lower-framed gateway. Fluted gorge cornices crown the building, central entrance, and small side openings. Symbolic Egyptian motifs adorn the front facade with a large scarab motif in the central recessed bay, and three disc motifs with outstretched wings and uraei, or sacred serpents, under the cornices. The entrance porch contains recessed piers, a wrought iron gate with masonic compass and square symbol, double timber doors, and a second scarab motif. Side elevations are simpler in detail.

The building contains a main hall at ground level and a lodge room above, both of which are decorated with Egyptian themed motifs, including palmette, lotus, and papyrus mouldings, astrological symbols, winged solar disc and the eye of Horus. The lodge room contains raised side platforms with timber bench seating, ritual furniture, and glass and metal light fittings.

An addition was made at the rear of the building in 1958 and minor internal modifications were made to accommodate this, however, generally the building remains highly intact.

== See also ==
- Architecture of Melbourne
- List of Masonic buildings
- List of places on the Victorian Heritage Register in the City of Boroondara
