= St George's Masonic Centre, Warwick =

Heritage-listed church building in Queensland, Australia

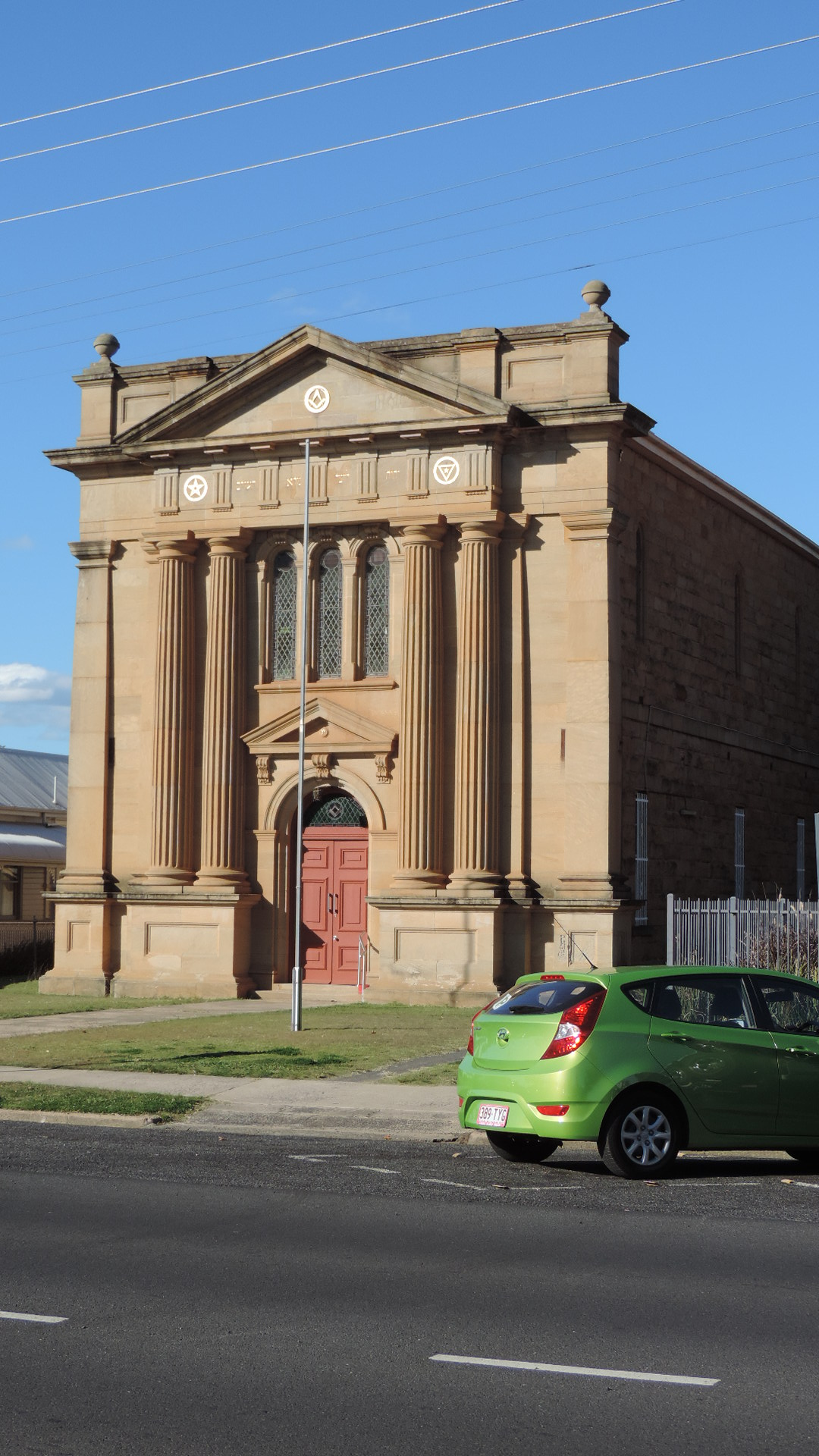
- St George's Masonic Centre, 2015

- Location within Queensland Location within Australia
- 28.217°S 152.0305°E
- Location: 50A Guy Street, Warwick, Southern Downs Region, Queensland, Australia

History
- Design period: 1870s–1890s (late 19th century)
- Built: 1886–1887

Site notes
- Architect: William Wallace
- Architectural style: Classicism

Queensland Heritage Register
- Official name: St George's Masonic Centre
- Type: state heritage (built)
- Designated: 21 October 1992
- Reference no.: 600952
- Significant period: 1886–1887, 1963 (fabric); 1887–ongoing (social)
- Significant components: memorial – honour board/ roll of honour, furniture/fittings, objects (movable) – social/community

St George's Masonic Centre is a heritage-listed masonic lodge at 50A Guy Street, Warwick, Southern Downs Region, Queensland, Australia. It was designed by William Wallace and built from 1886 to 1887. It was added to the Queensland Heritage Register on 21 October 1992.

== History ==
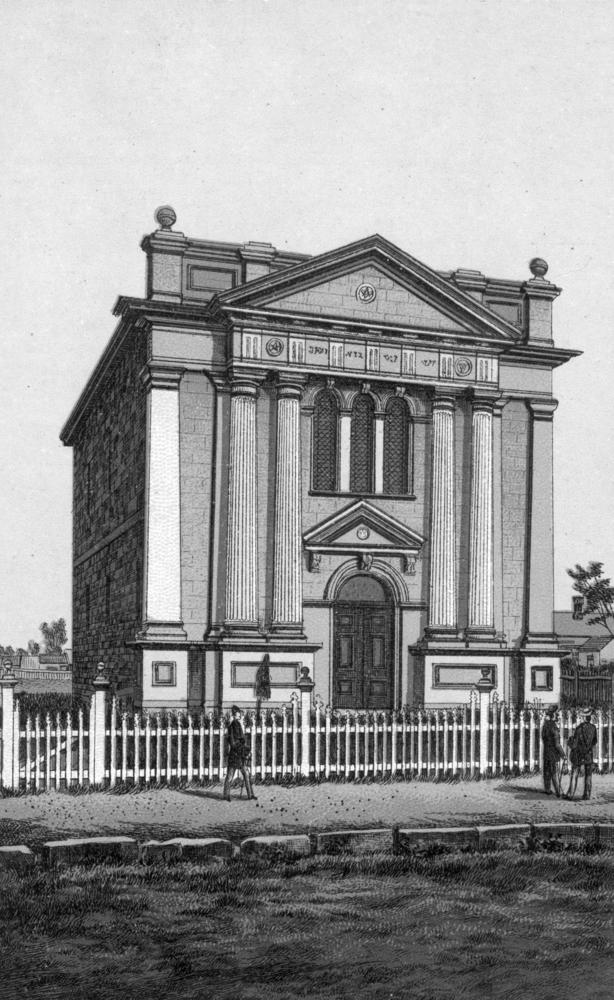
Masonic Hall, Warwick, circa 1887

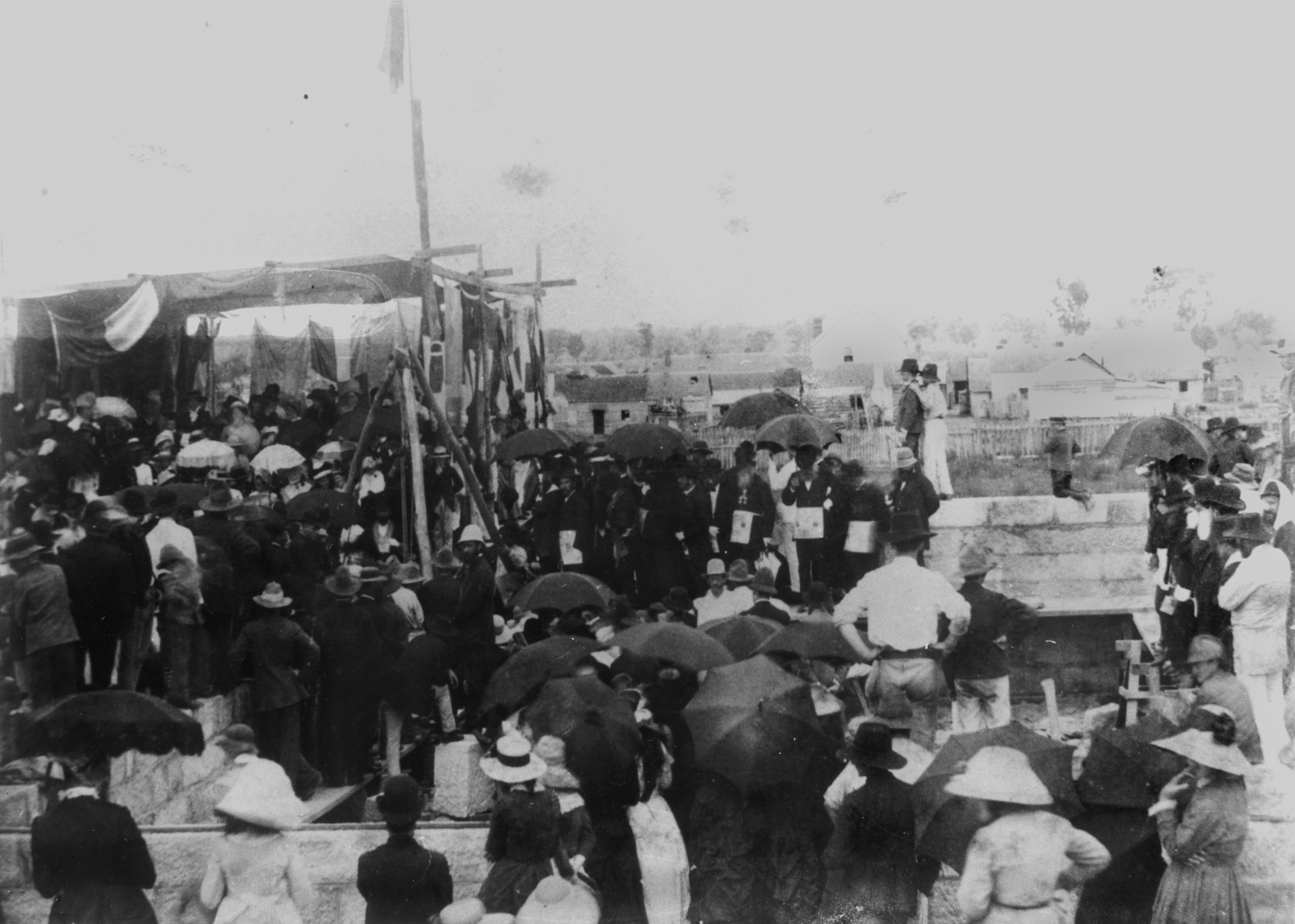
Laying the foundation stone for the Masonic Hall, Warwick, 1886

St Georges Masonic Centre is a double-storeyed sandstone building, the foundation stone of which was laid in November 1886. The building, which was opened in October 1887, was designed by Warwick architect William Wallace, who was also one of the trustees for the Masonic Lodge at this period. Wallace became the Mayor of Warwick in 1899. The centre was built on approximately half an acre of land, one block west of the main business centre of Warwick.

The site was granted to John Bennett in 1860, and had a succession of owners until it was acquired by Charles Baker in June 1885. In November 1885 the property was taken over by the trustees for the Masonic Lodge.

Both the laying of the foundation stone and the opening of the centre were elaborate occasions. The laying of the foundation stone was accompanied by full masonic ceremonials, including a procession of the "brethren of the mystic tie" through town to the site of the new hall. A scroll, the current coins of the realm and copies of the local newspapers were deposited in the cavity of the stone, before it was lowered into position. Both the laying of the foundation stone and the opening of the hall were celebrated with a ball.

At the time of its opening the centre was described as "... the addition of another public building, [to Warwick] surpassing all the others for magnificence...". The hall was notable for a number of features, including the patent springs under the ball room floor which had been manufactured specially for this purpose and were the first to be used in Warwick. The foundations of the masonic centre were composed of sand, and with the exception of the Warwick Town Hall, this was the only building in Warwick at the time having sand foundations. The building was constructed of sandstone, and together with buildings such as the Warwick Court House, Warwick Town Hall, Post Office, the goods shed at the Warwick railway station and various churches are among a group of important sandstone buildings constructed in Warwick in the late nineteenth century.

Ownership of the land was transferred to The Trustees of the St George's Lodge No. 20 of the Ancient Free and Accepted Masons of Queensland in 1959.

== Description ==
The Masonic Centre is a monumental double-storeyed sandstone building with a classical facade, and a corrugated iron hipped roof. The building assumes considerable prominence on the street, where its neighbours are single-storeyed detached buildings. The building has a simple rectangular plan running east-west, with a 1963 rendered blockwork annex to the rear. It contains a hall with an entry vestibule on each level: the upper level hall is richly appointed to cater to masonic ceremonial meetings, while the relatively spartan ground floor hall is used for more casual gatherings.

Externally, the rough hewn sandstone walls to the side and rear of the building contrast strongly with the finely carved symmetrical parapeted front facade. This facade has paired Doric columns, flanked by one and a half squared pilasters. The columns are spanned by a large pediment inlaid with the compass and square symbol, resting on an entablature inlaid with other masonic and Hebrew symbols. The columns and pilasters rest on a high plinth, and frame an arched doorway surmounted by a pediment and three arched windows.

The building, entered via central timber double doors opens into the ground floor entry vestibule. The entry vestibule has a dressing/store room to its right, and contains a fine set of carved cedar stairs with cupboards underneath. Another set of timber double doors open into the ground floor hall which has painted rough-hewn sandstone walls, timber boarded ceilings and a polished hardwood floor. The floor of the upper level hall is supported by two round timber columns and beams with decorative casings. The room is lit with timber sash windows with deep splayed dark timber reveals, and contains numerous lodge-related photos and prints.

The upper floor vestibule contains two banks of timber cupboards used for storage of robes, under a more recently added mezzanine. The timber boarded ceiling is decorated with two fine carved timber rosettes. The western wall has three arched diamond-glazed windows with stained glass borders and inset with masonic symbols.

The ceremonial hall is an impressive room with rich decoration and furnishings. The walls are embellished with fluted pilasters framing diamond glazed arched windows with stained glass edging. The pilasters are spanned by a substantial plaster architrave. A deep coved cornice rises to a timber boarded ceiling which has three intricate roses. The floor, which is stepped around its perimeter, is covered with red carpet, and has a black and white linoleum centrepiece in "masonic pavement" pattern.

The hall is laid out according to masonic practice with the Grand Master located to the east, the Senior Warden the west, the Junior Warden the south and the secretary to the north. The Grand Master's seat is framed with a carved timber aedicule with a curved pediment. All office bearers have timber "thrones" with triangular backs inlaid with the "jewels" or symbols of their office. These chairs are draped with collars also bearing the "jewels of office". A velvet upholstered bible pedestal sits in the middle of the room, with a triangular timber encased "G" suspended from the ceiling above it. A polished brass rostrum bearing memorial plaques is located to the south east of the Bible pedestal. Other furniture in the room inscribed with masonic symbols includes four small timber cube-shaped tables, a velvet upholstered timber kneeling stool, a small timber lift-top desk, and three timber Ionic, Doric and Corinthian half-columns which relate to the three key office bearers. The room contains numerous photos and certificates, and a carved timber and marble honour roll on the northern wall.

== Heritage listing ==
St George's Masonic Centre was listed on the Queensland Heritage Register on 21 October 1992 having satisfied the following criteria.

The place is important in demonstrating the evolution or pattern of Queensland's history.

The building is a rare example of a sandstone masonic temple in Queensland and demonstrates the principal characteristics of both a substantial masonic temple in Queensland and a late nineteenth century sandstone public building in Warwick.

The building exhibits aesthetic qualities valued by the community, in particular; it contributes to the streetscape as a prominent monumental building and contains well-crafted elements, notably the furniture in the ceremonial hall, the stairs, the window reveals and plasterwork.

As a place which has been in continuous use as a Masonic Centre since 1887, the configuration of furniture and fittings in the upper hall has a strong association with masonic ceremonies and the masonic lodge.

The place demonstrates rare, uncommon or endangered aspects of Queensland's cultural heritage.

The building is a rare example of a sandstone masonic temple in Queensland and demonstrates the principal characteristics of both a substantial masonic temple in Queensland and a late nineteenth century sandstone public building in Warwick.

The place is important in demonstrating the principal characteristics of a particular class of cultural places.

The building is a rare example of a sandstone masonic temple in Queensland and demonstrates the principal characteristics of both a substantial masonic temple in Queensland and a late nineteenth century sandstone public building in Warwick.

The place is important because of its aesthetic significance.

The building exhibits aesthetic qualities valued by the community, in particular; it contributes to the streetscape as a prominent monumental building and contains well-crafted elements, notably the furniture in the ceremonial hall, the stairs, the window reveals and plasterwork.

The place has a strong or special association with a particular community or cultural group for social, cultural or spiritual reasons.

As a place which has been in continuous use as a Masonic Centre since 1887, the configuration of furniture and fittings in the upper hall has a strong association with masonic ceremonies and the masonic lodge.
