= Evander McIver =

- Born: 1834; Melbourne, Victoria
- Died: 28 June 1902 (aged 68); Abbotsford, Victoria
- Occupation: Architect
- Buildings: Scots Uniting Church Albany W.A., North Melbourne Presbyterian Church 1879, Brunswick Uniting (Presbyterian) Church, South Essendon (Primitive) Methodist Church, Camperdown Presbyterian Church 1901, St. Cuthbert's Church Brighton, Kew Presbyterian Church, Union Memorial Church 1887, St Andrews Presbyterian Church Queenscliff 1892, and Broadmeadows District Roads Board Office.

Evander McIver (1834 – 28 June 1902) was an Australian architect, engineer and surveyor. McIver is best known for a number of Gothic Revival, mostly Presbyterian churches he designed in Melbourne, Australia, during the "boom" era of the 1880s.

== Early life ==
Evander McIver was born in 1835 in Assynt, in the north west of Scotland. He was the son of a crofter and mason, Kenth McIver. Evander initially trained as a stonemason then the manager of the Duke of Sutherland’s estates, recognised his talent and assisted him to be trained in architectural studies. He later became an architect and worked at Inverness, Scotland before migrating to Australia in 1864 aboard the London when he was about 30. McIver lived in Park Street, Brunswick and was a prominent member of St Andrews Presbyterian Church in Brunswick where a memorial plaque to him is placed on the west wall of the church).

== Career ==
McIver appears to have begun his career as Clerk and Surveyor for the Broadmeadows District Roads Board in 1865. In the following year he may have designed the bluestone and granite office building for the Board, which stands in Ardlie Street West Meadows. as well as secretary and engineer to the shire of Broadmeadows, he was also consulting engineer to the municipalities of Brunswick, Essendon, Flemington and Kensington, and North Melbourne.

As an engineer he was responsible for the Moonee Ponds Creek Bridge in Fawkner Street Westmeadows in 1869, and the Bell Street Bridge in Coburg in 1880. In 1872 McIver called tenders for a bluestone tower at the Glenara homestead in Bulla which had been designed by Albert Purchas. A major commission was the St. Andrew’s Presbyterian Church, Sydney Rd, Brunswick in 1880. This was followed by a polychrome brick church in the form of the South Essendon (Primitive) Methodist Church in Mt Alexander Road, Essendon in 1882 and St Andrews Presbyterian Church Kerang.

Rare examples of his domestic commissions are the villa Doneraile in Camberwell, which is "a prototype for the emerging Federation villa", and ‘Tiri-Tiri’ at 46 Kyarra Road, Glen Iris One of his few works outside Victoria was the Scots Uniting Church in Albany Western Australia.

In 1887 McIver had offices in the Western Market Buildings, 439 Collins Street Melbourne and in the 1890s he had an office on the 5th floor of the Australian Buildings at the corner of Elizabeth Street and Flinders Lane in Melbourne.

== Major works ==
- 1874 Brick and Stone Bridge over Merri Creek Northcote
- 1879 Union Memorial Presbyterian Church, Curzon & Elm Sts. North Melbourne (competition winner)
- 1884 Presbyterian Church, Park Street, West Brunswick
- 1887 Presbyterian Church, Kew
- 1887 St Cuthbert's Presbyterian Church, Brighton
- 1887 Presbyterian Church, Clifton Hill
- 1887 Presbyterian Manse, Dandenong (demolished)
- 1888 Stanhope Mansion, Holmes Rd, Moonee Ponds
- 1890-1 Residence and stabling, Brunswick
- 1892 Brick Presbyterian Church, Clifton Hill
- 1893 Rebuilding of Junction Hotel, Tullamarine
- 1896 Manse of Brunswick Presbyterian Church, Park St. West Brunswick.
- 1900 Presbyterian Church, Ngambie, red brick

== Personal life ==
McIver was a staunch member of the Presbyterian Church, and a well known and respected resident of Brunswick, Victoria. He was married three times, with his third wife, Margaret Williams (1857–1934) surviving him along with several children by his second and third wives. He was first married in 1864 to Catherine Ann Clunas (1839–1874). Catherine died in 1874, and McIver then married (Mary Louisa Buzaglo), daughter of William Frederick Buzaglo, the secretary of the Shire of Coburg. When Mary died, he dedicated a stained glass window in the Brunswick Presbyterian Church to her, which reads "In Sacred Memory of Mary Louisa Buzaglo, the beloved wife of Evander McIver – a dutiful daughter, and affectionate sister, a faithful friend, a devoted mother, a loving wife, a consistent Christian. Died 1st October, 1887".

He lived out his retirement in his home 'Glen-Iver' in a grand two storey Italianate villa in Park Street, Brunswick, which he designed and still stands. He died on 28 June 1902 at his home and was buried at the Melbourne General Cemetery. His son Gordon John Kennedy McIver was a prominent surgeon in World War 1.
