= Scots Uniting Church, Albany =

Scots Uniting Church
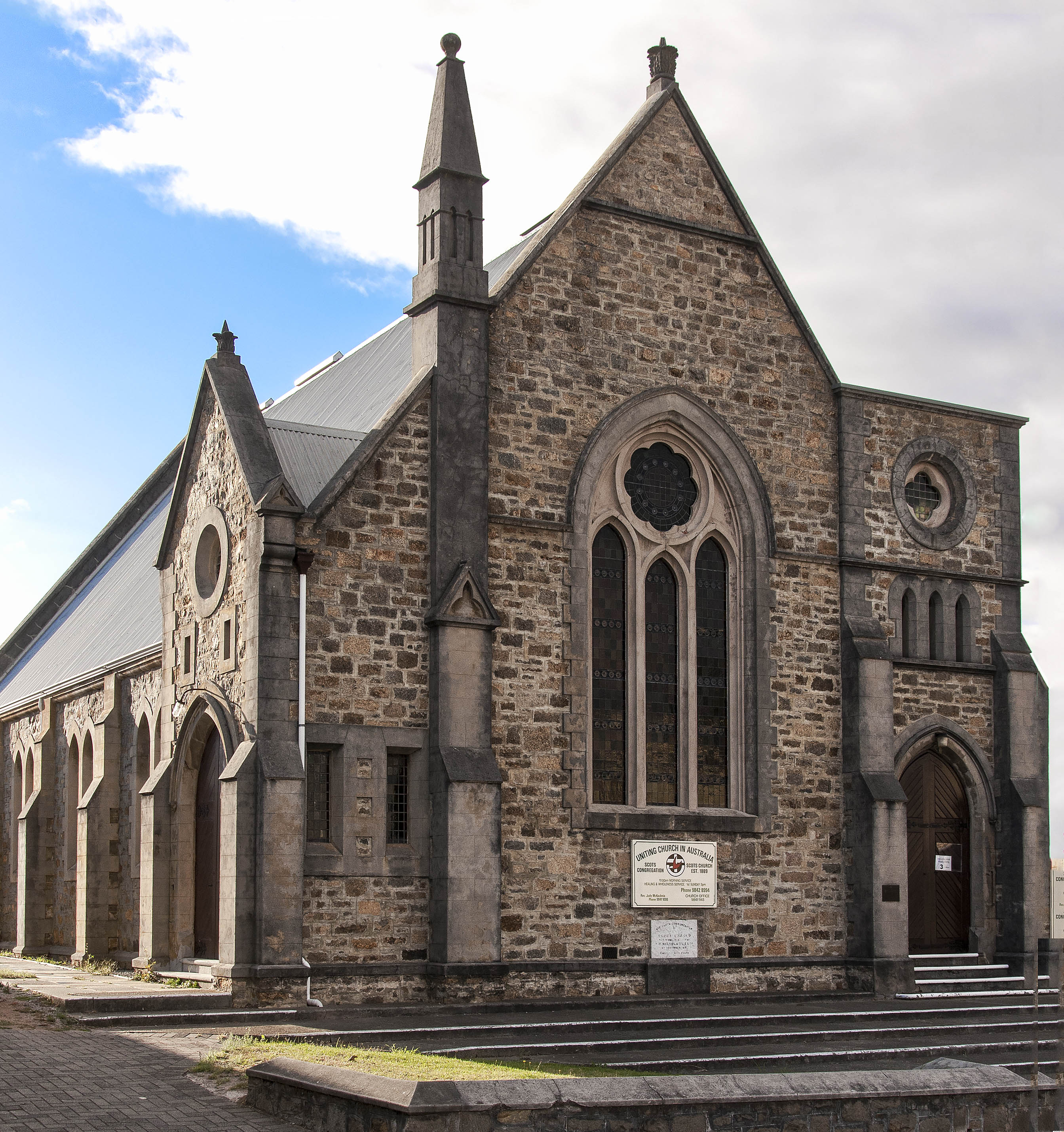
- Scots Uniting Church
- Scots Uniting Church
- 35°01′29″S 117°53′02″E
- Address: York Street, Albany, Great Southern region of Western Australia
- Country: Australia
- Denomination: Uniting (since 1977)
- Previous denomination: Presbyterian (1891–1977)
- Website: arc.ucwa.au

History
- Former name: Scots Presbyterian Church
- Status: Church
- Founded: 25 November 1891
- Founder: P. H. Nicholson
- Dedicated: 30 March 1892

Architecture
- Functional status: Active
- Architect: Evander McIver
- Architectural type: Church
- Style: Gothic Revival
- Construction cost: A£1,416

Specifications
- Materials: Granite; corrugated iron

Administration
- Parish: Albany Region Congregations

Western Australia Heritage Register
- Type: State Registered Place
- Designated: 7 October 1997
- Reference no.: 78

Scots Uniting Church, originally known as the Scots Presbyterian Church, is a Uniting church located on York Street, the main street of Albany in the Great Southern region of Western Australia.

== History ==
Originally a Presbyterian church, it was the third Presbyterian congregation in Western Australia, commencing in January 1889. Services were originally held in the Albany Town Hall and the Penny Post buildings until the church was completed. The Melbourne architect Evander McIver was asked to draw up plans and W. Sangster was contracted to complete the construction. The foundation stone was laid in November 1891, with the building completed and opened in March 1892. The total cost of the building was A£1,416.

Built to a Victorian Academic Gothic Revival style, it is mostly constructed of finely crafted local granite and topped with a corrugated iron roof. The church has a strongly gabled form with rendered buttresses and heavily timbered doors.

In 1969 a hall, kitchen, vestry and two rooms were added to the building and constructed from brick.

The name of the church was changed in 1977 when the Presbyterian church amalgamated with the Methodist and Congregational churches to form the Uniting Church.

The church is almost opposite St John's Anglican Church, giving a quiet atmosphere along the busy street.

== See also ==
- List of places on the State Register of Heritage Places in the City of Albany
