= Plaridel Masonic Temple =

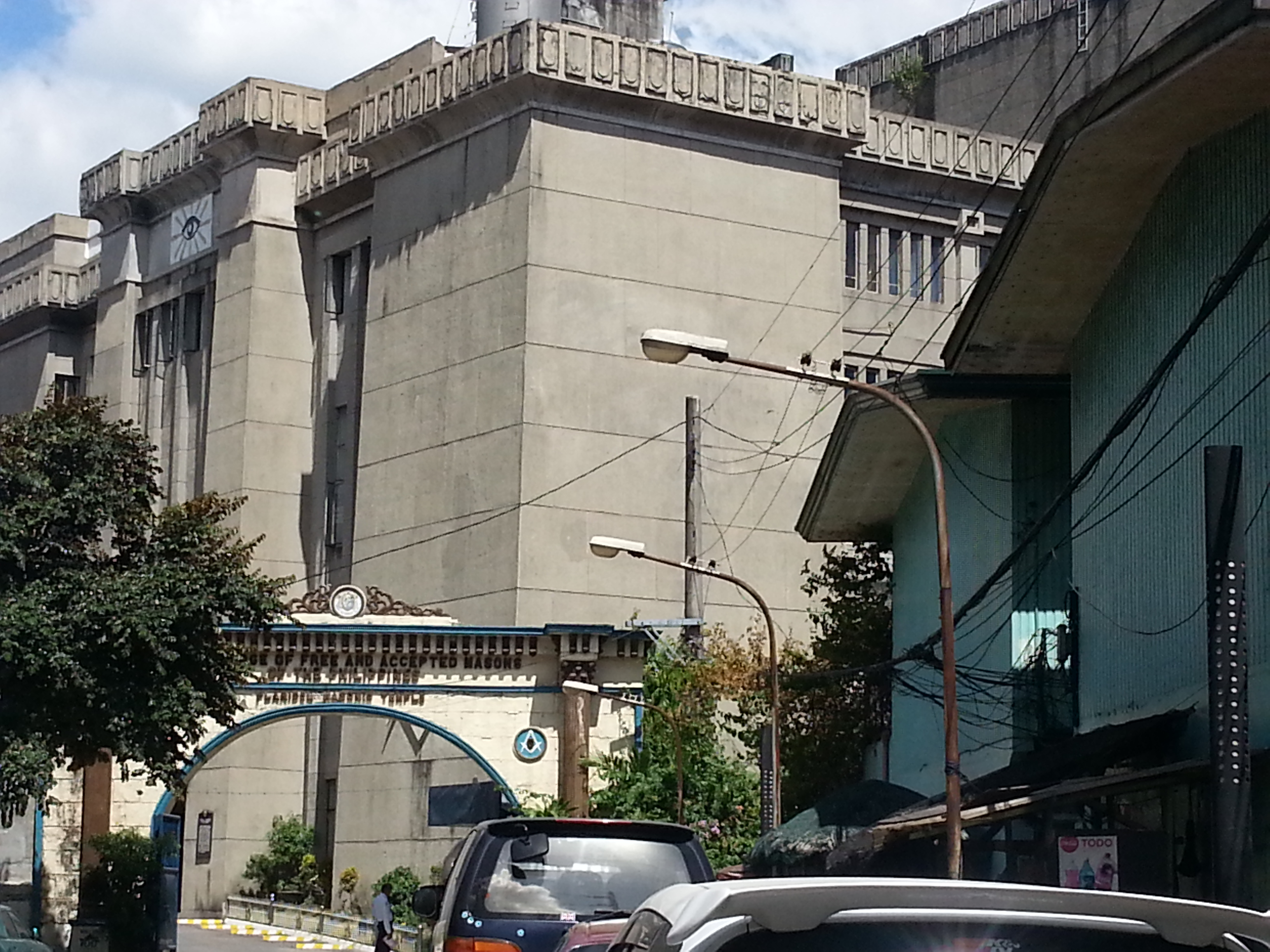
- Side View of the Building

- Location within Metro Manila

Location
- Location: Ermita, Manila
- Interactive map of Plaridel Masonic Temple
- Coordinates: 14.579391°N 120.990136°E

Architecture
- Completed: Originally built in 1914; Rebuilt in 1948 after World War II; Reconstructed in 2006

The Plaridel Masonic Temple, is a reconstruction of a historic building located at 1440 San Marcelino Street in Ermita, Manila. It is the headquarters of the Most Worshipful Grand Lodge of Free and Accepted Masons of the Philippines. It was declared as a Historical Landmark in 1987 by the National Historical Commission of the Philippines (formerly National Historical Institute).

== History of the building ==
The building was originally constructed in 1914 as a clubhouse for German migrants. During World War I, the clubhouse was leased to YMCA. In 1919, it was sold to the Plaridel Temple Association, an exclusive corporation of Masons. The Plaridel Masonic Temple property was handed to the Grand Lodge of the Philippines Islands in 1937 and had it improved a year after during the incumbency of Justice Jose Abad Santos, the Grandmaster.

During World War II, the temple was occupied by Japanese forces and got damaged, by fire, during the battle for the liberation of Manila in 1945. It was rebuilt in 1948. In 2000, the temple, including the relics of Freemasonry in the Philippines, were destroyed by fire. It was reconstructed and the new building was formally inaugurated in 2006.

== Gallery ==
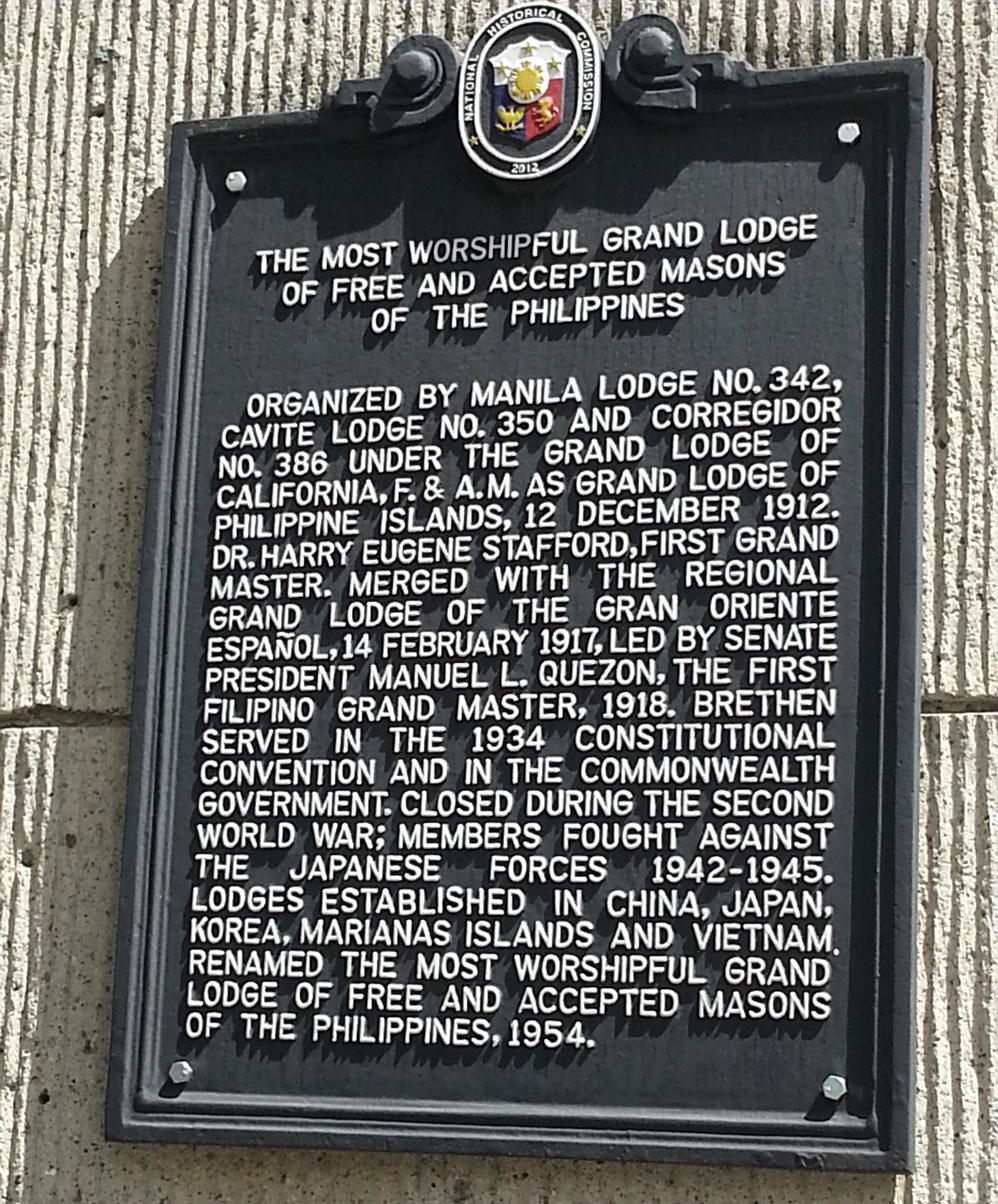
Historical Marker

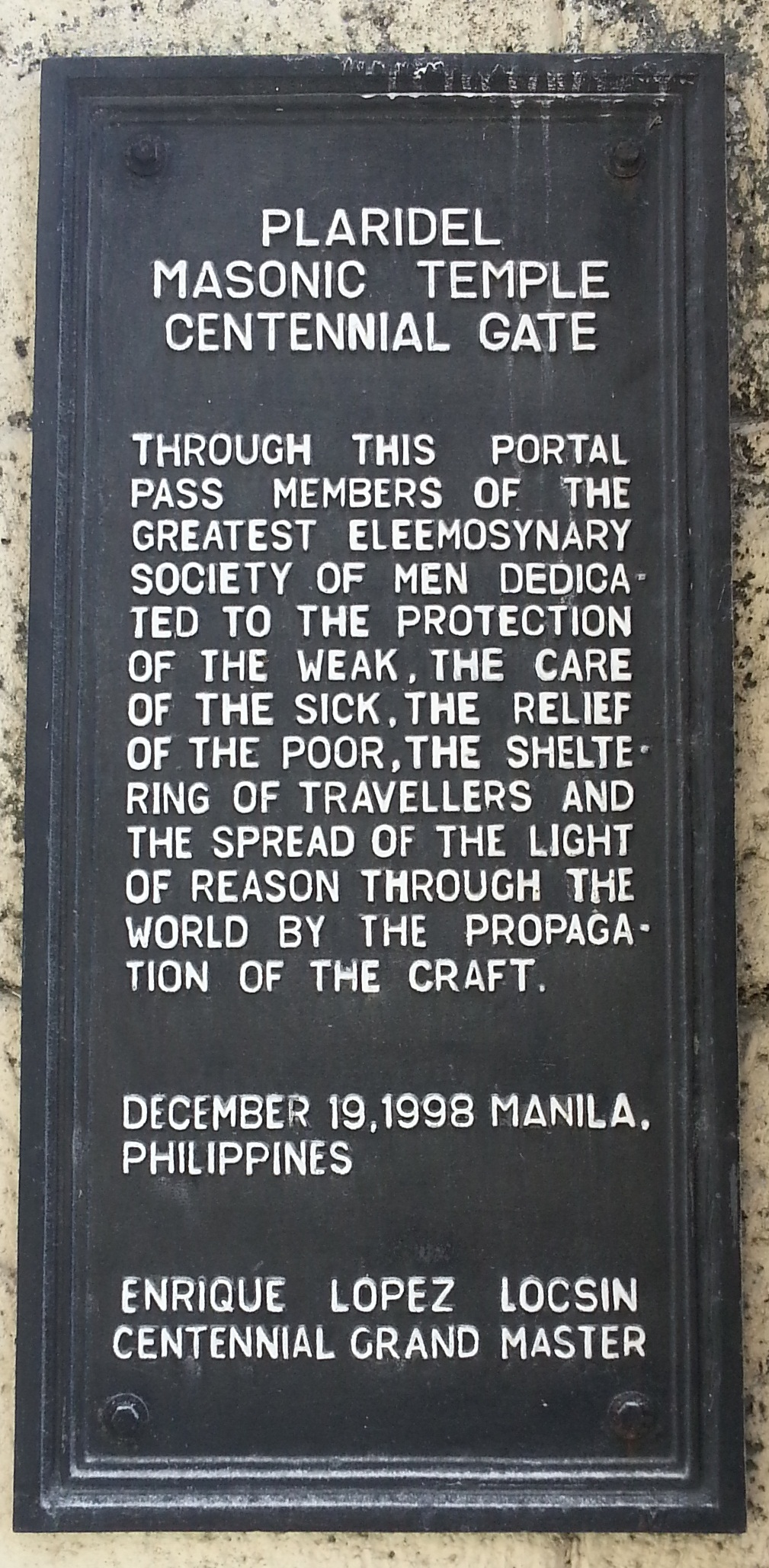
Centennial Gate Marker

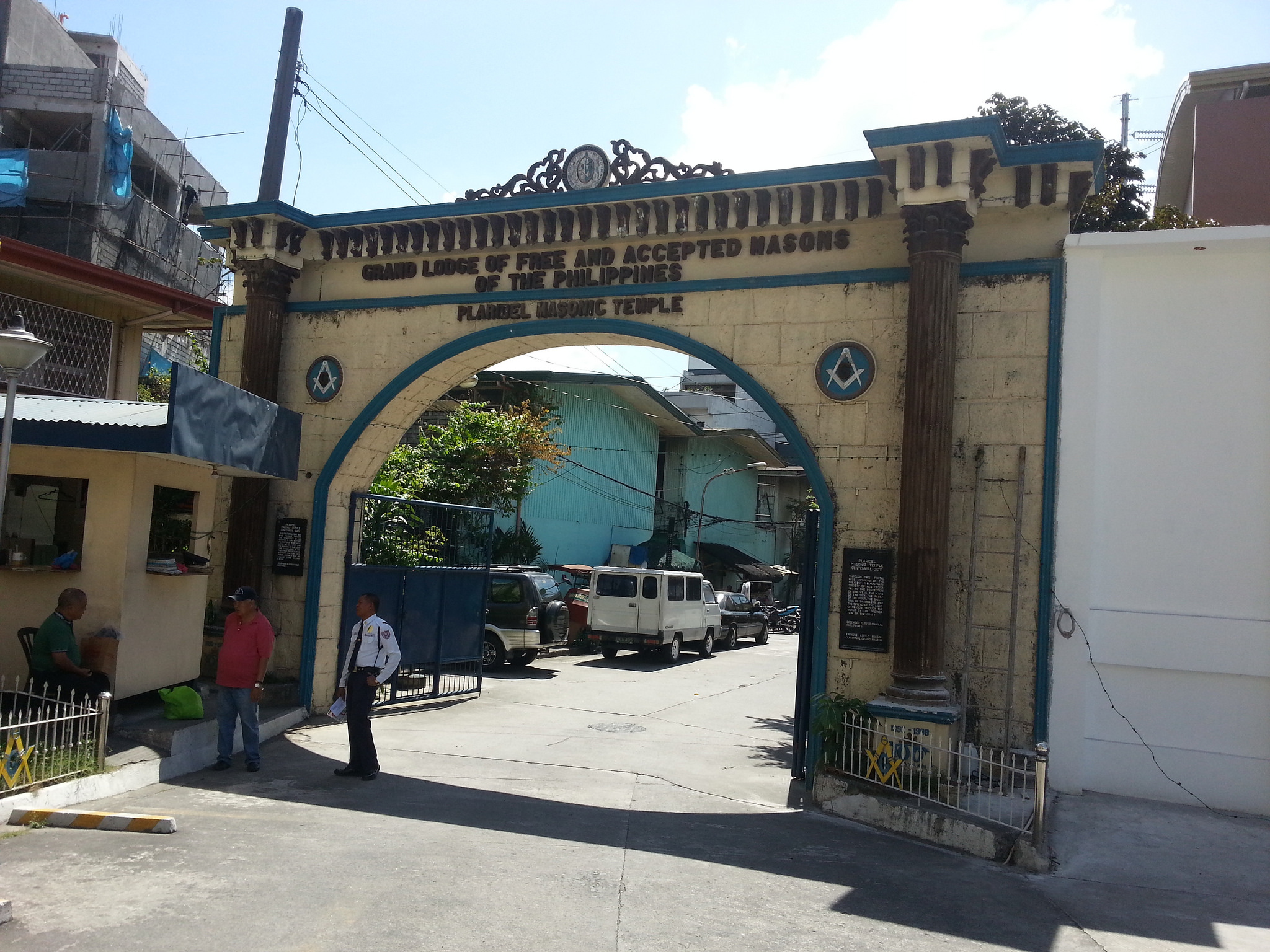
Main Portal
