= William Stanford (sculptor) =

Australian sculptor (1839–1880)

William Walter Tyrell Stanford (1839 – 2 June 1880) was an Australian sculptor.

Stanford was born in London, England, son of Thomas Tyrell, contractor, and his wife Frances née Trevor. As a youth Stanford was apprenticed to a stonemason. Stanford died of "ulceration of the stomach" on 2 June 1880 at Prahran.
