= Johnny Fox (performer) =

American sword swallower (1953–2017)

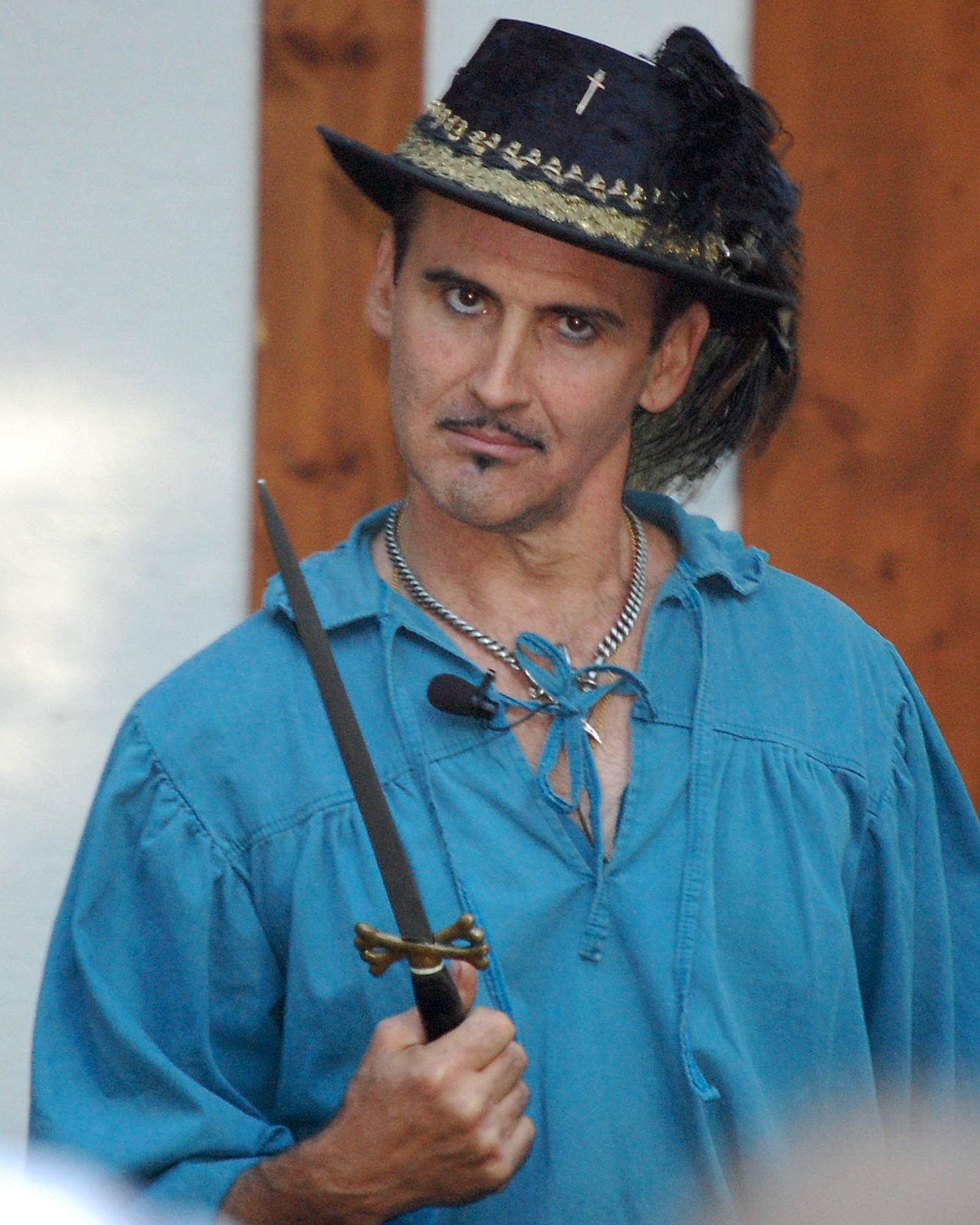
- Fox performing as a sword swallower at the Maryland Renaissance Festival in 2007
- Born: John Robert Fox; November 13, 1953; Minneapolis, Minnesota, U.S.
- Died: December 17, 2017 (aged 64)
- Occupations: Sword swallower; performer; magician; museum curator

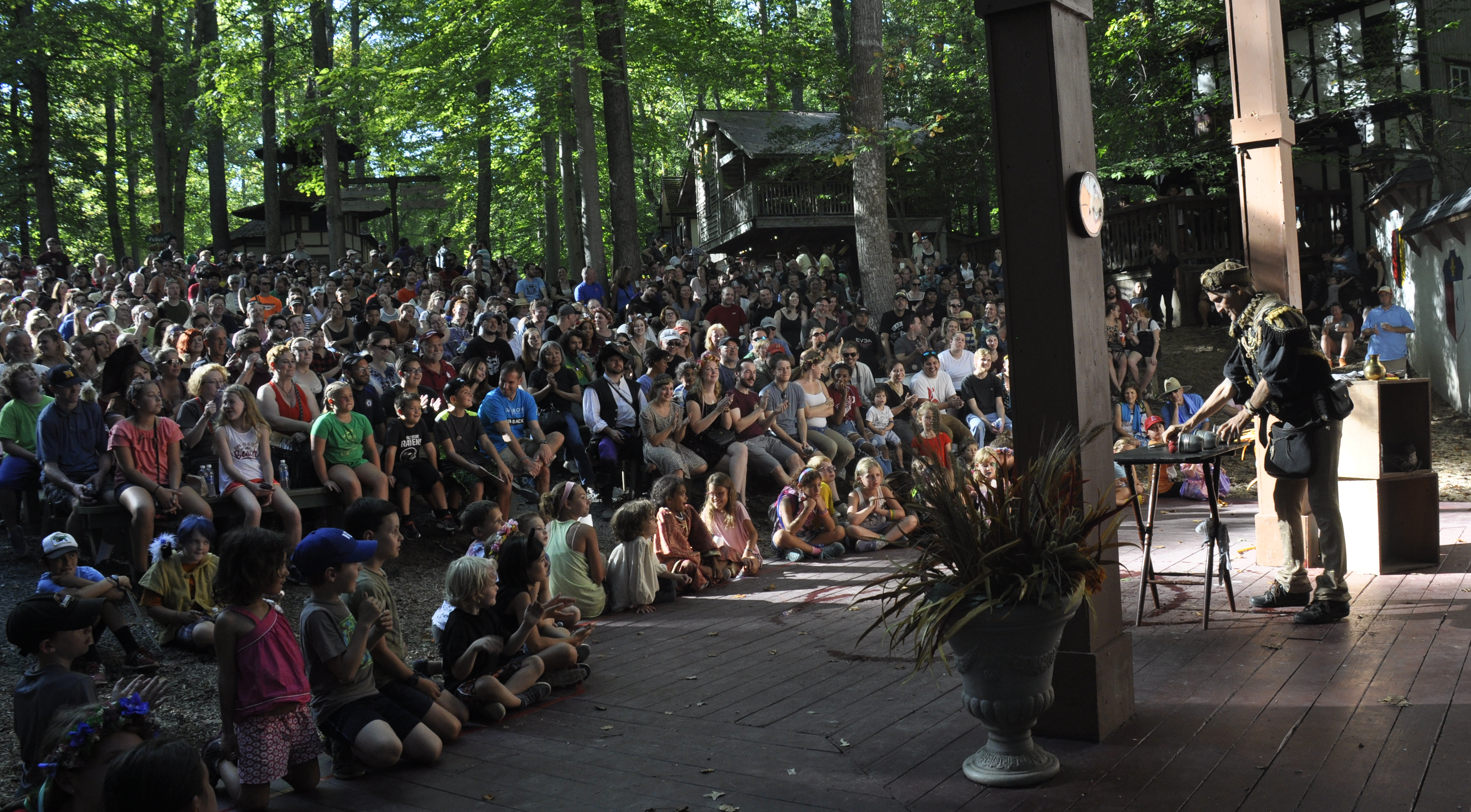
Johnny Fox performing cups and balls at the Maryland Renaissance Festival in 2017, a few months before his death

John Robert "Johnny" Fox (November 13, 1953 – December 17, 2017) was an American professional sword swallower and sleight of hand expert.

== Early life ==
Fox was born in Minneapolis, Minnesota, and grew up in Hartford, Connecticut. He saw his first sword swallower at the Eastern States Exposition in West Springfield, Massachusetts, when he was eight or nine years old. At approximately the same age, his father gave him a book about Harry Houdini which inspired Fox—substituting spaghetti—to recreate the magician's trick of swallowing a key on a string and then regurgitating it.

== Performance career ==
Fox began performing magic and comedy while working as a waiter in Saint Petersburg, Florida. He learned sleight-of-hand in the 1970s from Tony Slydini, an Italian magician known as "the Master of Misdirection". In his early twenties, Fox was performing in Boulder, Colorado, when he heard that his act had been stolen by a competing magician. He was inspired to begin swallowing swords in order to have "an act people couldn't copy easily". It took him eight months to master the technique, although he injured himself on several occasions learning it. Fox estimated in 1999 he was one of only twenty professional sword swallowers in the United States, noting there were many more than when he began.

Fox could swallow up to 22 inches of steel. Besides swallowing regular swords, his act included swallowing a retractable tape measure, a giant screwdriver and a neon glowing sword plugged into an outlet. His act also included eating fire—until he learned that the chemicals used in the trick could seep into his liver.

Fox appeared at such venues as comedy clubs, casinos, and tattoo conventions, as well as special events such as an Aerosmith album release party. His television appearances include the Late Show with David Letterman, a 1992 Jonathan Winters television special, and a Maalox commercial in which he swallowed light bulbs. He was featured in the 2003 documentary Traveling Sideshow: Shocked and Amazed by Jeff Krulik.

Fox was the resident sword-swallower at the annual Maryland Renaissance Festival in Crownsville, and performed there from 1981 through 2017. Prior to the festival's 2017 season, the festival's Royal Stage, where Fox performed, was renamed to the Royal Fox Theatre in his honor. He began performing at the Sterling Renaissance Festival in Sterling, New York in 1997. He occasionally worked as a consultant for other sideshow artists.

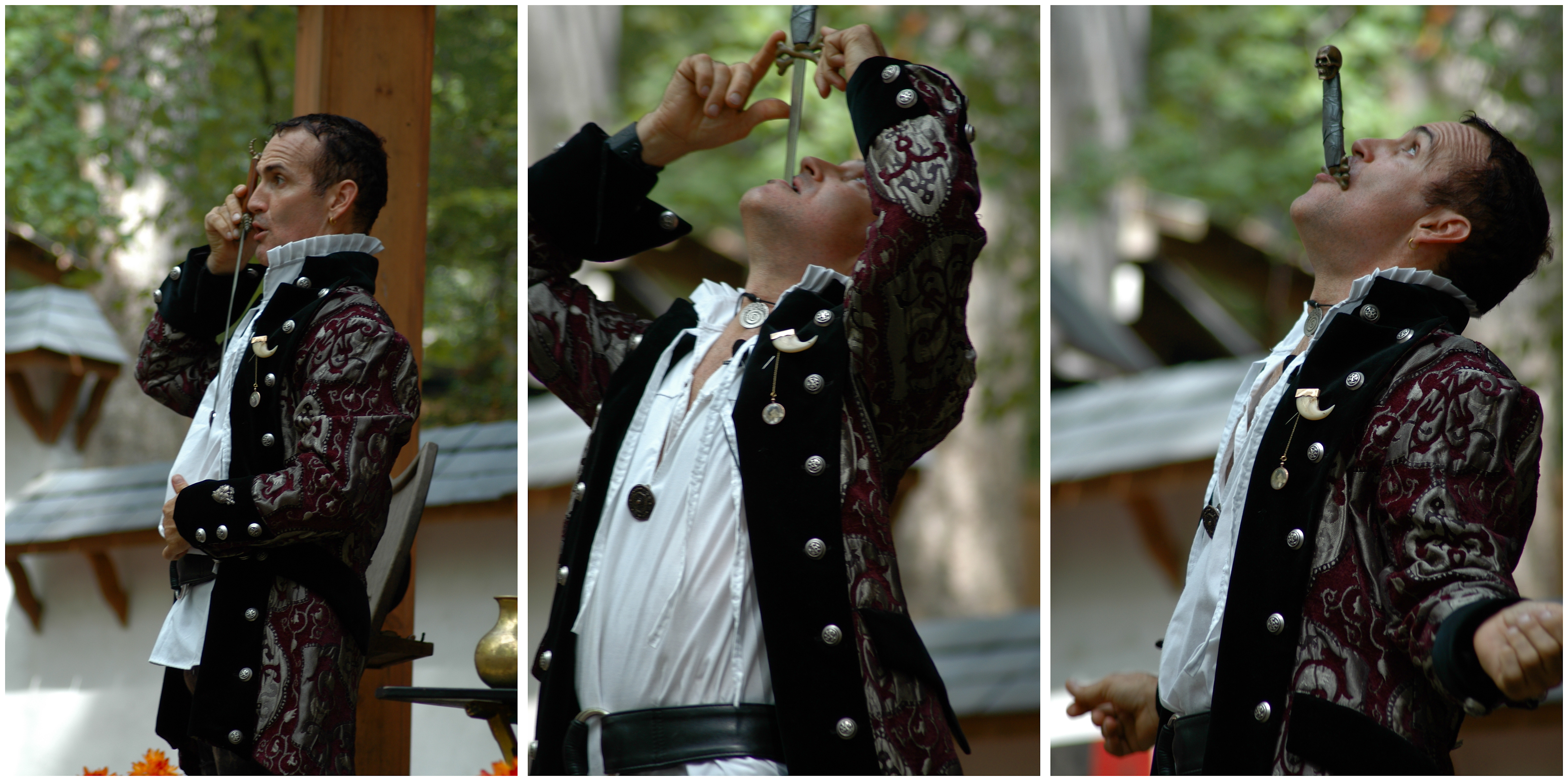
Johnny Fox sword swallowing at the Maryland Renaissance Festival in 2006

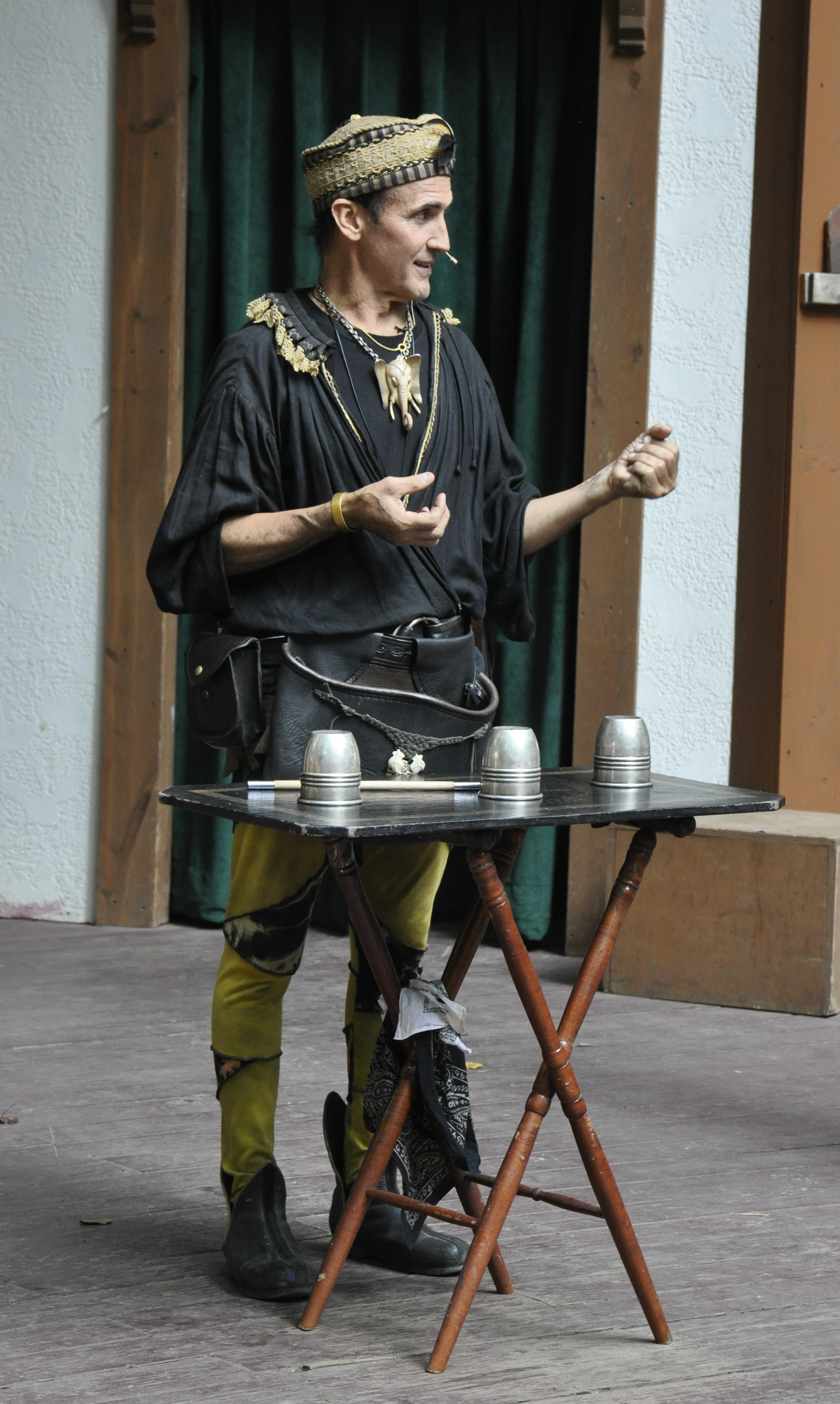
Johnny Fox performing cups and balls routine at the Maryland Renaissance Festival in 2016

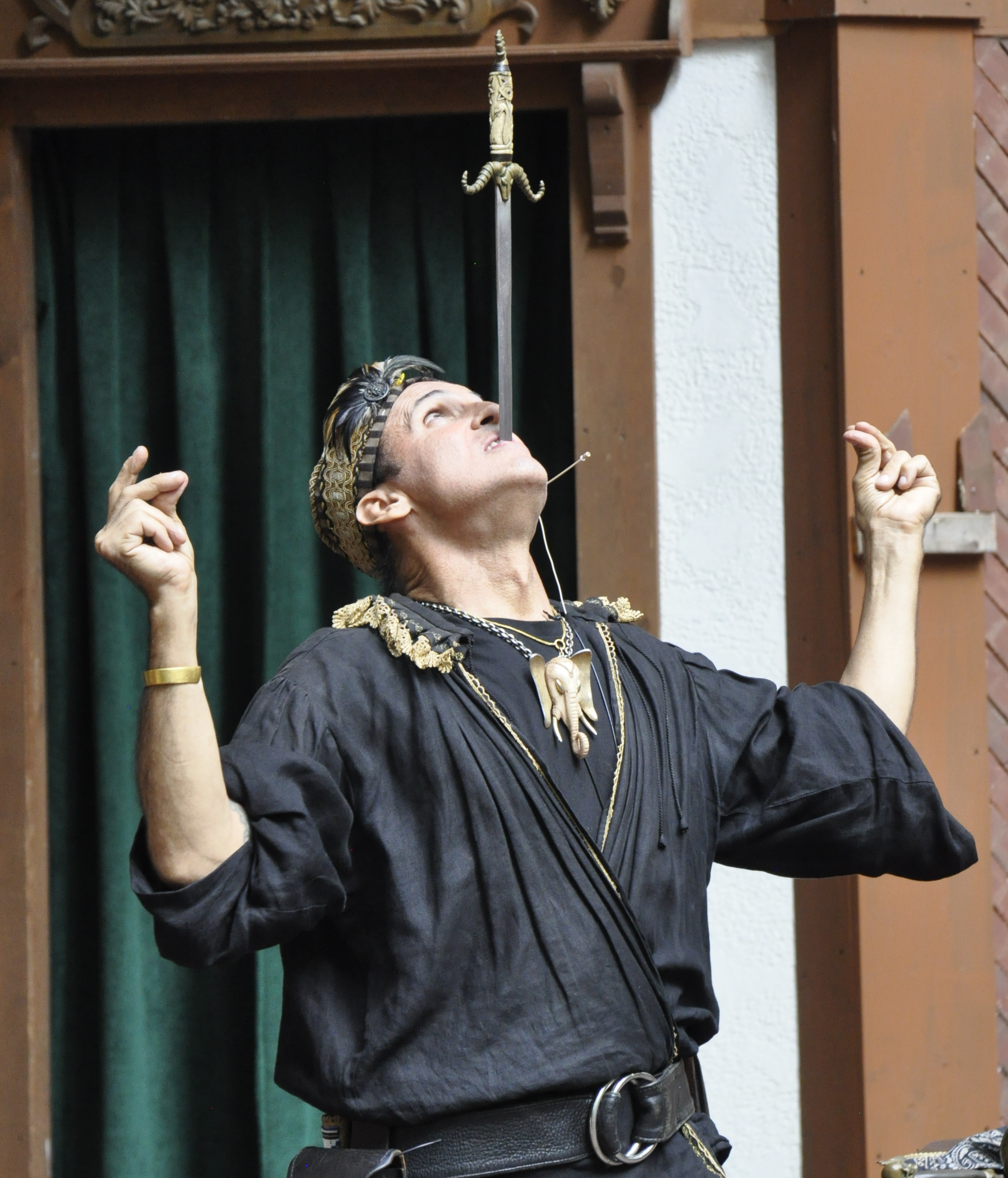
Johnny Fox sword swallowing at the Maryland Renaissance Festival in 2016, before his diagnosis

== Freakatorium ==
In June 1999, Fox opened the Freakatorium, El Museo Loco, a museum of side show curiosities, on the Lower East Side of Manhattan. In the face of low numbers of visitors and rising rent, the museum was closed in January 2005. Fox was partly inspired to open the museum by his childhood visits to Hubert's Museum and Flea Circus in Times Square. His collection of oddities includes narwhal tusks, an elephant's-foot liquor chest, a two-headed turtle, a vest owned by General Tom Thumb, and the glass eye of Sammy Davis Jr.

== Personal life ==
Fox married his wife, Valeria, an Argentine dancer and photographer, while they were atop elephants in Annapolis, Maryland, in 2002. They resided in Seymour, Connecticut.

== Illness and death ==
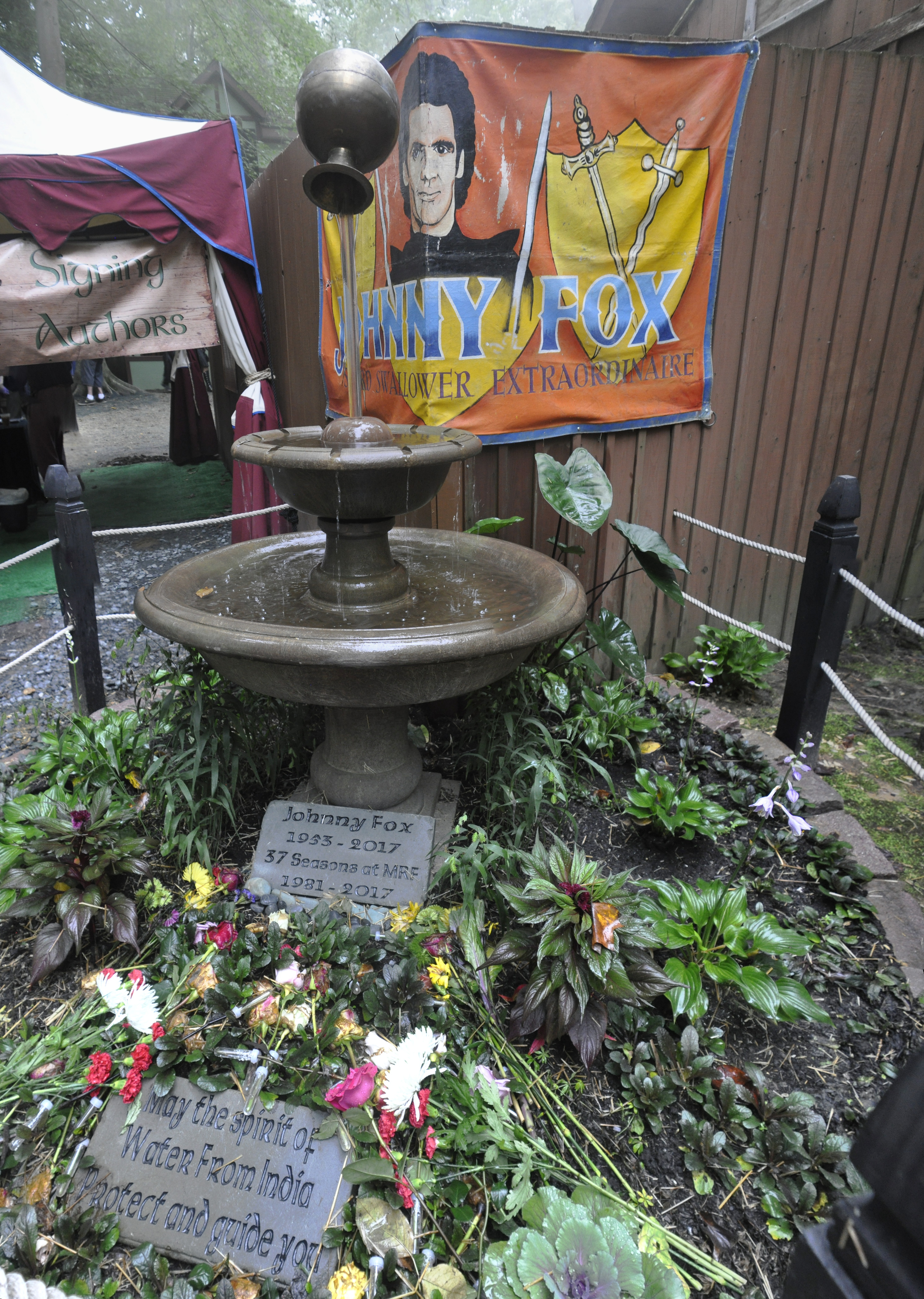
Johnny Fox memorial at the Maryland Renaissance Festival in 2018

In the fall of 2016, Fox was diagnosed with hepatitis-C and cirrhosis of the liver and tumors. Then, in the winter of 2016, Fox slipped on black ice at his home in Connecticut which, combined with his liver problems, put him in a coma for several days.

After waking up from his coma, he recovered enough to return to performing at the Maryland Renaissance Festival for the fall 2017 season.

Fox died on Sunday, December 17, 2017, of liver cancer, aged 64.
