= Cups and balls =

Magic illusion trick

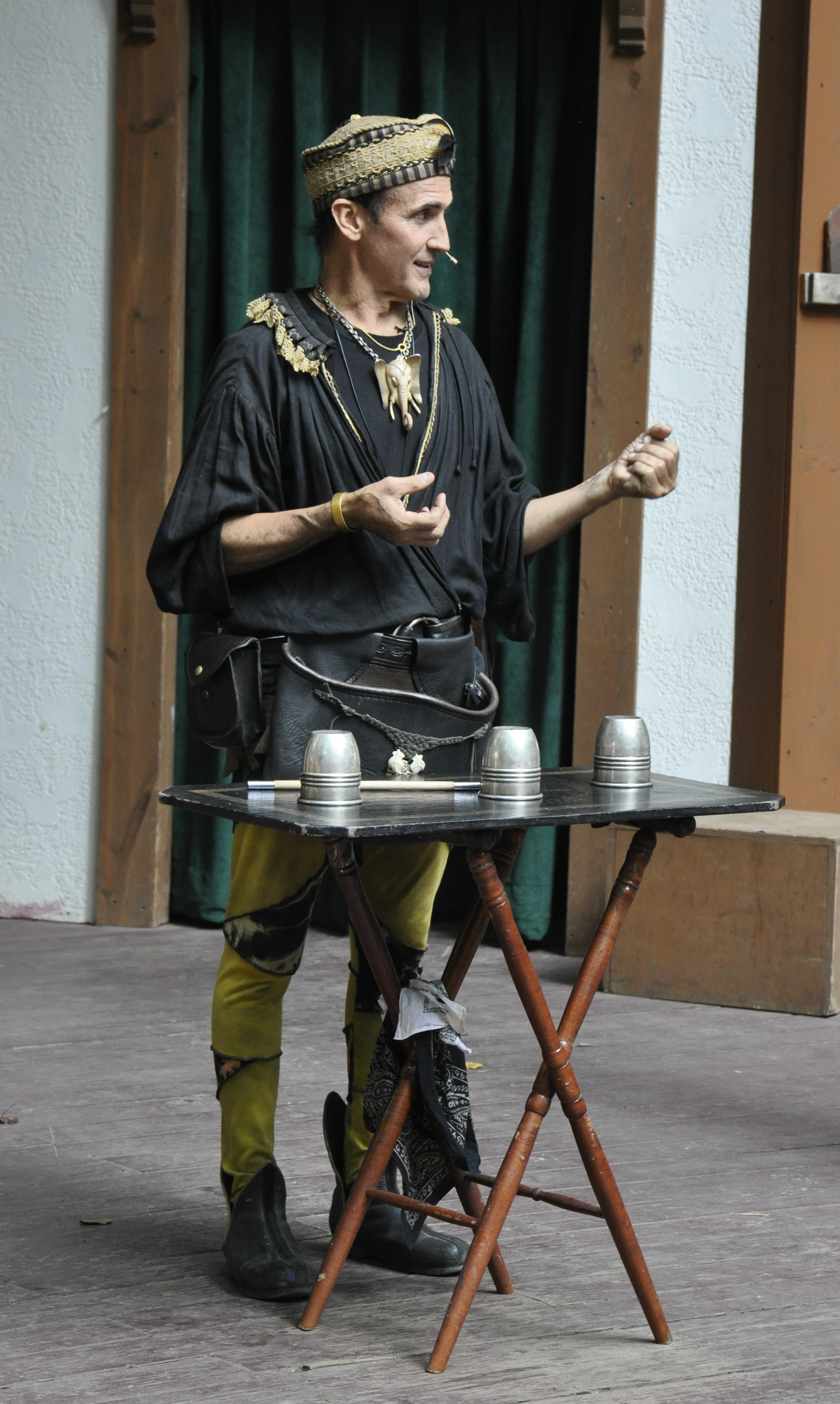
Johnny Fox performing a cups and balls routine at Maryland Renaissance Festival. A gibeciere can be seen around his waist.

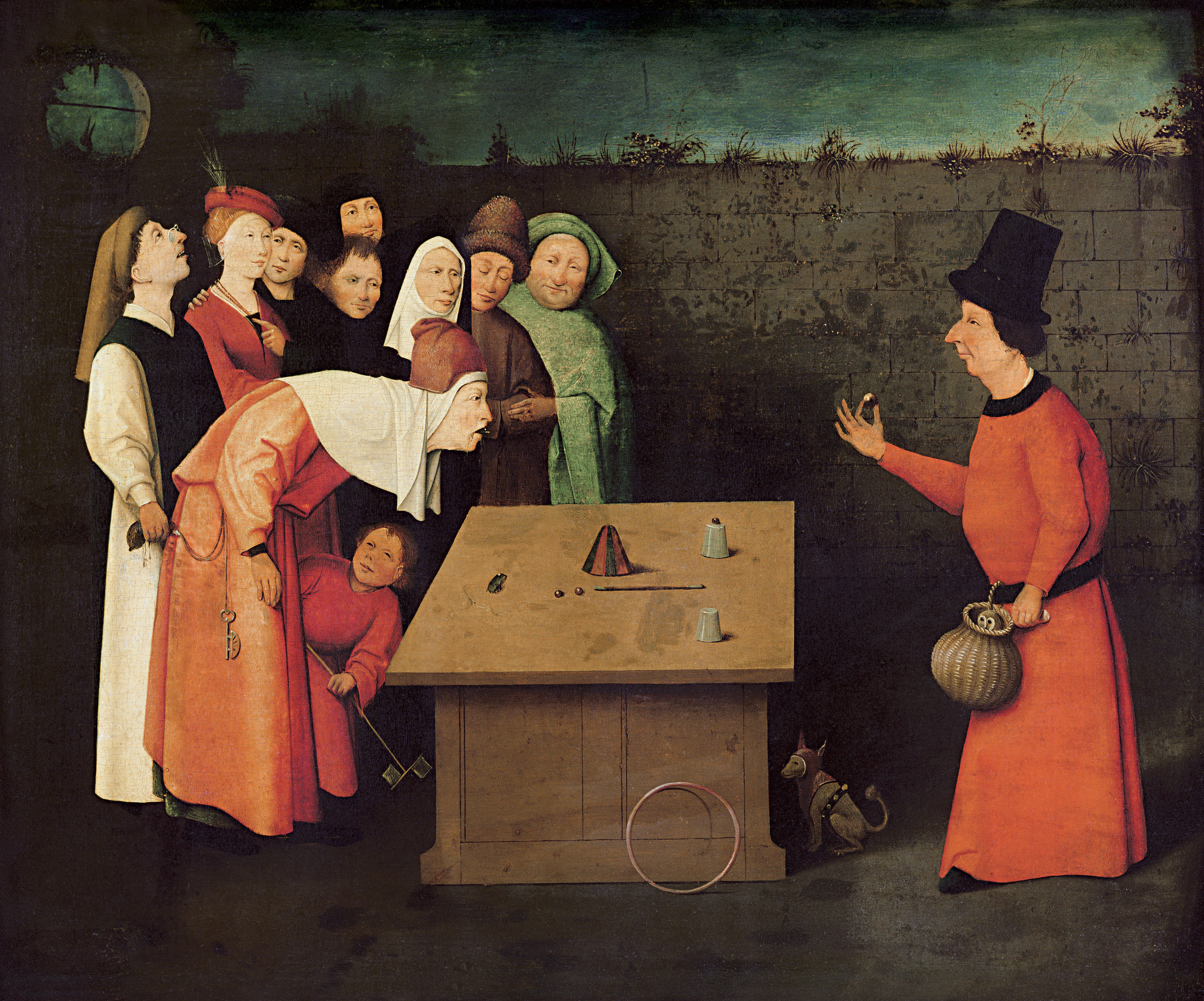
Hieronymus Bosch: The Conjurer, 1475–1480. Notice the person on the far left is stealing a man's purse while he is distracted by the game

The cups and balls is a performance of magic with innumerable adaptations. Street gambling variations performed by conmen were known as Bunco Booths. A typical cups and balls routine includes many of the most fundamental effects of magic: the balls can vanish, appear, transpose, reappear and transform. Basic skills, such as misdirection, manual dexterity, sleight of hand, and audience management are also essential to most cups and balls routines. As a result, mastery of the cups and balls is considered by many as the litmus test of a magician's skill with gimmick style tricks. Magician John Mulholland wrote that Harry Houdini had expressed the opinion that no one could be considered an accomplished magician until he had mastered the cups and balls. Professor Hoffman called the cups and balls "the groundwork of all legerdemain".

Instead of cups, other types of covers can be used, such as bowls or hats. The shell game con is a rogue variant of the cups and balls used as a confidence trick.

== History ==
The effect, also known as acetabula et calculi, was performed by Roman conjurers as far back as two thousand years ago, as referred to in Seneca's 45th Epistle to Lucilius:

Sic ista sine noxa decipiunt quomodo praestigiatorum acetabula et calculi, in quibus me fallacia ipsa delectat. Effice ut quomodo fiat intellegam: perdidi lusum.

Translation:

Such quibbles are just as harmlessly deceptive as the juggler's cup and dice, in which it is the very trickery that pleases me. But show me how the trick is done, and I have lost my interest therein.

One popularly circulated picture, thought to date from 2500 B.C. from the walls of a burial chamber in Beni Hasan, Egypt, shows two men kneeling over four inverted bowls. It was taken by early Egyptologists Wilkinson and Newberry as evidence that the cups and balls effect, or its related deceptive gambling game, thimblerig, possibly dates back to Ancient Egypt. Because of its context, modern Egyptologists regard the image as a game using pots or cups but details of the game are unknown. The illustration is unique in ancient Egyptian art, so whether or not the game utilizes sleight of hand trickery may never be known unless a future discovery produces a similar image in a more explanatory context.

== Performance and variations ==
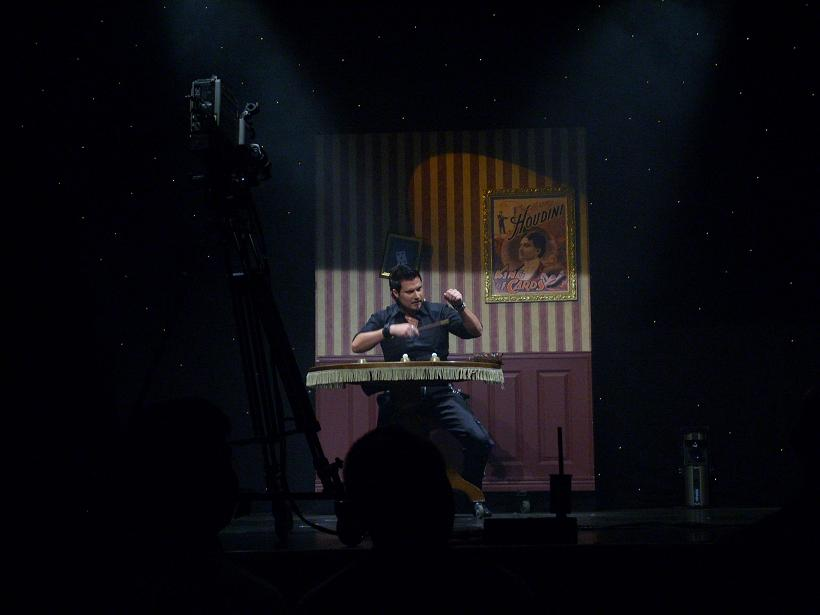
Christian Farla performs Cups and Balls on stage.

The most widely performed version of the effect uses three cups and three small balls. The magician makes the balls appear to pass through the solid bottoms of the cups, jump from cup to cup, disappear from the cup and appear in other places, or vanish from various places and reappear under the cups (sometimes under the same cup), often ending with larger objects, such as fruit, larger balls, small animals such as baby chicks, or a combination of the different final loads. Many magicians use fruit, as each one is different in shape and size, thus increasing the element of surprise.

=== Basic routine ===
Starting with three cups set down in a line with three balls visible, one of the balls is put on top of the centre cup and the other two cups nested above. With a tap of the wand, the three cups are lifted, revealing that the ball has "penetrated" the cup. Again the cups are set in a line, the middle cup covering the ball which has already penetrated. Another of the visible balls is placed on top of the centre cup and covered with the other two cups, the cups being tapped and lifted to show the second ball has penetrated. This is repeated with the third ball.

=== Medieval cups and balls ===
In 1584 Reginald Scot wrote The Discoverie of Witchcraft, within which he describes tricks with balls. He recommends using candlesticks with a hollow underneath, or bowls, or salt cellars covers to cover the balls. He describes the routine with three or four balls, and as many covers. He describes placing a ball under each cover, lifting the covers to show the balls vanished, and then having the balls all re-appear under one cover. Although Scot describes a method, it is considered by magicians to be unlikely as some of the moves described would be impossible to perform invisibly.

=== Indian cups and balls ===
In India, the cups and balls (named Cheppum Panthum) were performed seated on the ground, with an audience stood, or in chairs around the performer. This unique line of sight for the audience gave rise to some unique sleight of hand moves. The cups that are used are shaped like a shallow bell, a shallow bowl with a small knob handle on the top. They are often held between the first two fingers by this handle. The shallow nature of the cups means that a large item cannot be produced at the end of the routine, so the routine is often ended with the production of many of the same sized balls, although Shankar Junior would end with the production of black powder from one of the bowls. The number of cups and balls used varies, with between one and five balls in play during the routine, and between two and four cups.

=== Owan To Tama ===
Owan To Tama, the "Turning of Bowls" is the Japanese version of the cups and balls. The magician uses three bowls, and traditionally four soft silk covered balls, a fan and three final productions, either oranges or boxes, sometimes of cigarettes. The movements of the Japanese routine are based on Japanese classical dance. There is a display to show the bowls used called "Owan-Gaeshi" where the performer passes the bowls from hand to hand, showing them empty in a dance-like manner. The routine has been described as having a reverent, ceremonial air. The routine was also performed kneeling on the floor, for a kneeling audience. Unlike other cups and balls routines the Japanese magician would usually work inside, and to music.

=== "Bean sowing" ===
The Chinese routine of the cups and balls is often called "The Immortal Sowing Beans" and originated in ancient agricultural society prior to the Shang dynasty (c. 1600– 1046 BCE), likely as early as the Longshan culture period. It takes its name from the saying "Plant melons and you get melons; sow beans and you get beans".

The props used consisted of a fan, a mat, between two and six bowls, and between three and ten beans. The most common variant used two bowls with either three or five beans. The Chinese method is unusual in that an extra bean or ball is rarely used, and it employs atypical methods of concealing the beans. Traditionally the routine was performed on the ground, but in present times it is more commonly performed on a table.

Another typical element of the Chinese routine is to both begin and end the performance in dramatic fashion. Common routines include changing a small peach into an egg, producing water (sometimes with fish), or producing Baijiu. The finale "Harvesting a Million Beans" involves placing two bowls mouth to mouth one on top of the other, then, when the top bowl is slowly lifted from the bottom bowl (which may have contained, e.g., only water before) the lower bowl is seemingly overflowing with ("a million") tiny beans. While, as with the Indian routine, the Chinese do not always conclude this performance in dramatic fashion, one performer that is known to is 王鬼手 ("Wang Gui Shou"), whose name means "king of ghost hands".

=== Modern cups and balls: the Dai Vernon routine ===
The cups and balls have a long history, and the routines performed by today's performers are built upon the work of previous masters. In ancient Greece and Rome magicians would perform standing behind a table, as opposed to on the ground as seen in Egypt, India and Turkey, to allow a larger audience to see the show, and this tradition has continued today. Tall conical shaped metal cups were the norm in Europe and Egypt until the routine by Dai Vernon became popular using shorter, more squat cups that were about as tall as the hand. Similar squat cups were popularised by the likes of Paul Fox, Charlie Miller and Ross Bertram.

Dai Vernon's influence can be seen in many modern routines. Jim Cellini, a student of Tony Slydini and teacher of many street performers, credits his routine to Vernon, Miller, and Johnny Fox. Dai Vernon's student, Michael Ammar, of whom Louis Falanga, President of L&L Publishing, said: "Ammar has literally led the industry in shaping the thinking and performing of this generation of magicians", created his own routine based upon what his teacher had taught him.

The Vernon routine consists of vanishing the three balls, to reappear under the cups, the penetration of the balls through the cups, the spectator choosing which cup to invisibly transport a ball to, the removal and return of the balls, and the revelation of the final large production items, usually fruit. Watching a modern performance of cups and balls, one is likely to see a similar sequence followed.

=== Chop cup ===
A fairly modern development is the 'chop cup'. This cup was invented around 1954 by Al Wheatley who performed a Chinese-costumed act with the name "Chop Chop". The chop cup is a variation with one cup and (seemingly) one ball, hugely popular because it requires only a very small flat area to perform, unlike the considerable table space needed for the classic three-cup routine. The Chicago close-up magician Don Alan performed his streamlined chop cup routine on television. and was immediately copied by magicians all over the world. Paul Daniels' routine with the chop cup has also done a lot for the routine's popularity. The chop cup can be handled entirely by the top, creating a more seemingly impossible performance.

=== Three shell game ===
The three shell game is similar in some respects to the three cup routine. In it, the main move is a steal of the pea from the back of the shell. This is achieved by using a flexible pea and performing the trick on a soft surface. The pea is squeezed out under the back of the shell into the fingers in the act of pushing the shell forward. In a similar way, the pea can be introduced under a shell by drawing it back. These moves are made casually in swapping the positions of the shells. The spectator is supposed to follow by eye which shell has the pea, but in reality, they have no chance of success as the performer is always one step ahead of the spectators.

=== Clear Cups ===
==== Penn & Teller ====
The magic duo Penn & Teller performs a version of the cups and balls trick in their act. Initially, they perform the trick with small aluminum foil balls and plastic cups. The trick ends with the appearance of larger foil balls under the cups, and the surprise appearance of an extra unrelated object, such as a potato or a lime, under one or more cups. They then repeat the trick using transparent plastic cups, claiming that they will reveal how to perform the trick. However, as part of the joke, they do the trick so fast as to make it difficult to follow. They claim that this version of the cups and balls breaks all four rules of magic: not to tell the audience how a trick is done, not to repeat the same trick twice, not to show the audience the secret preparation, and the "unwritten rule" never to perform the cups and balls with clear plastic cups.

==== Latimer Clear Cups and Balls ====
The Latimer Clear Cups And Balls is an illusion, created and performed by American illusionist Jason Latimer. In this version of the "follow the ball" cups and balls game, the magician uses clear glass cups and the audience can watch as the balls visually vanish and jump to underneath another cup. The effect was debuted by Jason Latimer in 2003 at International Federation of Magic Societies (FISM), and on US television on The Late Late Show with Craig Ferguson in 2004.
