= Fast and Loose =

Fast and Loose may refer to:

- Fast and Loose (con game), a cheating game sometimes known as "The Strap"
- Fast and Loose (1930 film), a romantic comedy starring Miriam Hopkins and Carole Lombard
- Fast and Loose (1939 film), a detective comedy starring Robert Montgomery and Rosalind Russell
- Fast and Loose (1954 film), a film from the UK starring Stanley Holloway and Kay Kendall
- Fast and Loose, a song by Motörhead on their 1980 album Ace of Spades
- Fast and Loose (TV series), a 2011 UK TV series
