= Shell game =

Confidence trick

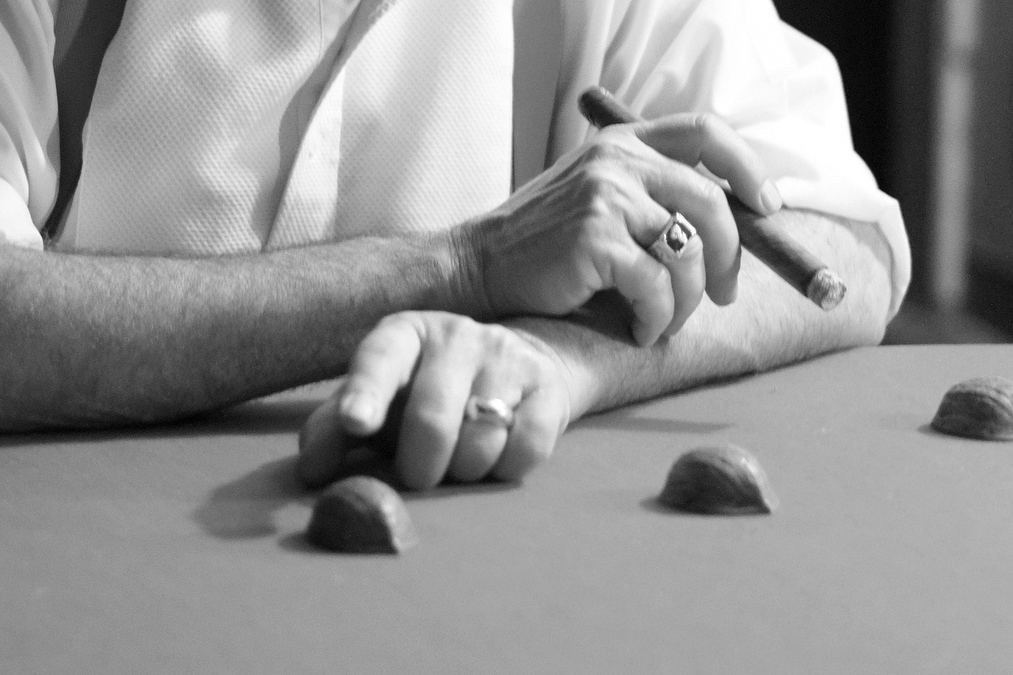
The shell game involves a small item hidden under one of several shells

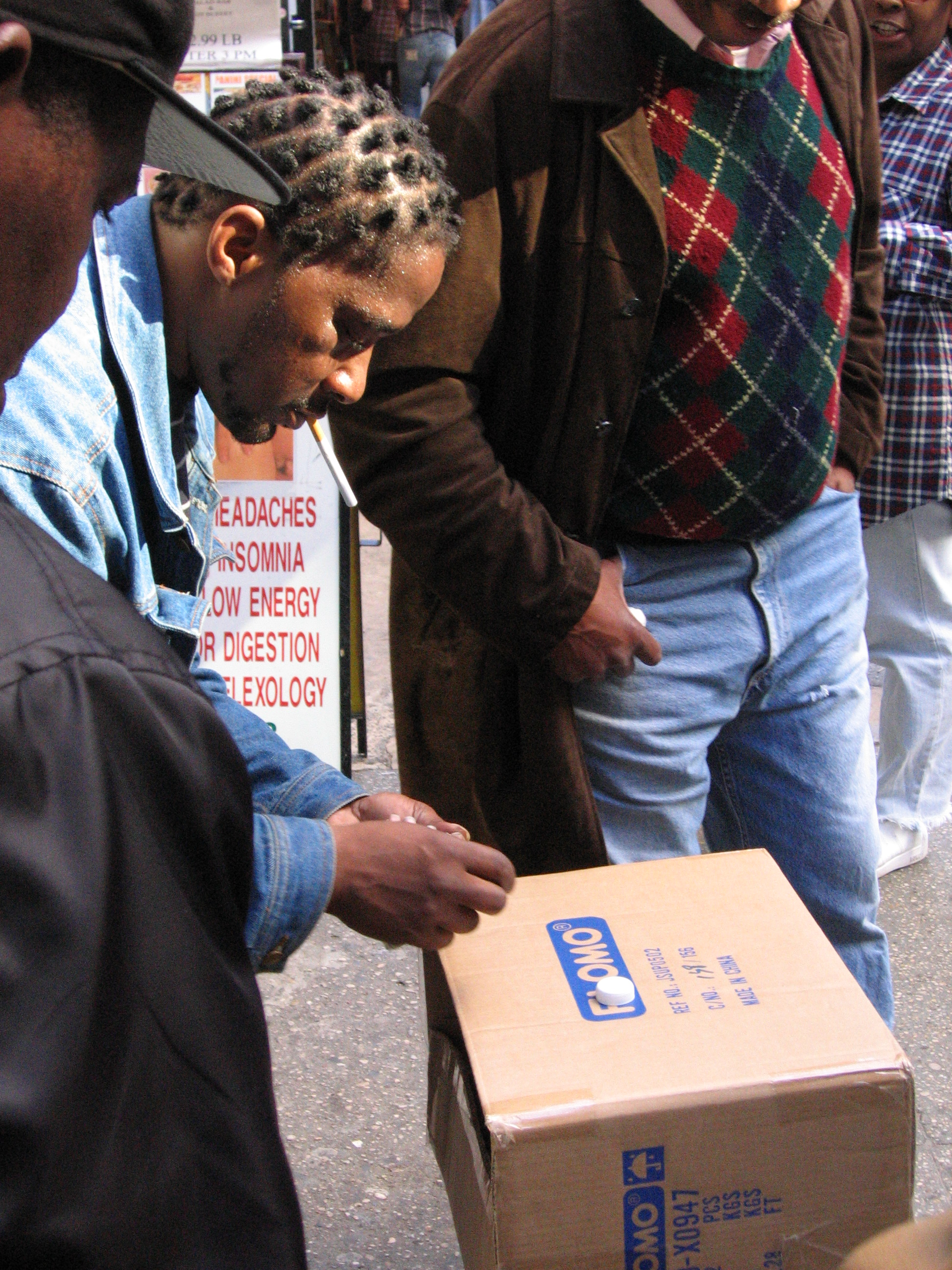
An illegal shell game performed with bottle caps on Fulton Street in New York City

The shell game (also known as thimblerig, three shells and a pea, the old army game) is a public gambling game that challenges players to follow the movement of a marker hidden under one of several covers (shells). In practice, the game is almost always run as a confidence trick that uses sleight of hand to transfer the marker between covers. In confidence trick slang, this swindle is referred to as a short-con because it is quick and easy to pull off. The shell game is related to the cups and balls conjuring trick, which is performed purely for entertainment purposes without any purported gambling element.

== Play ==
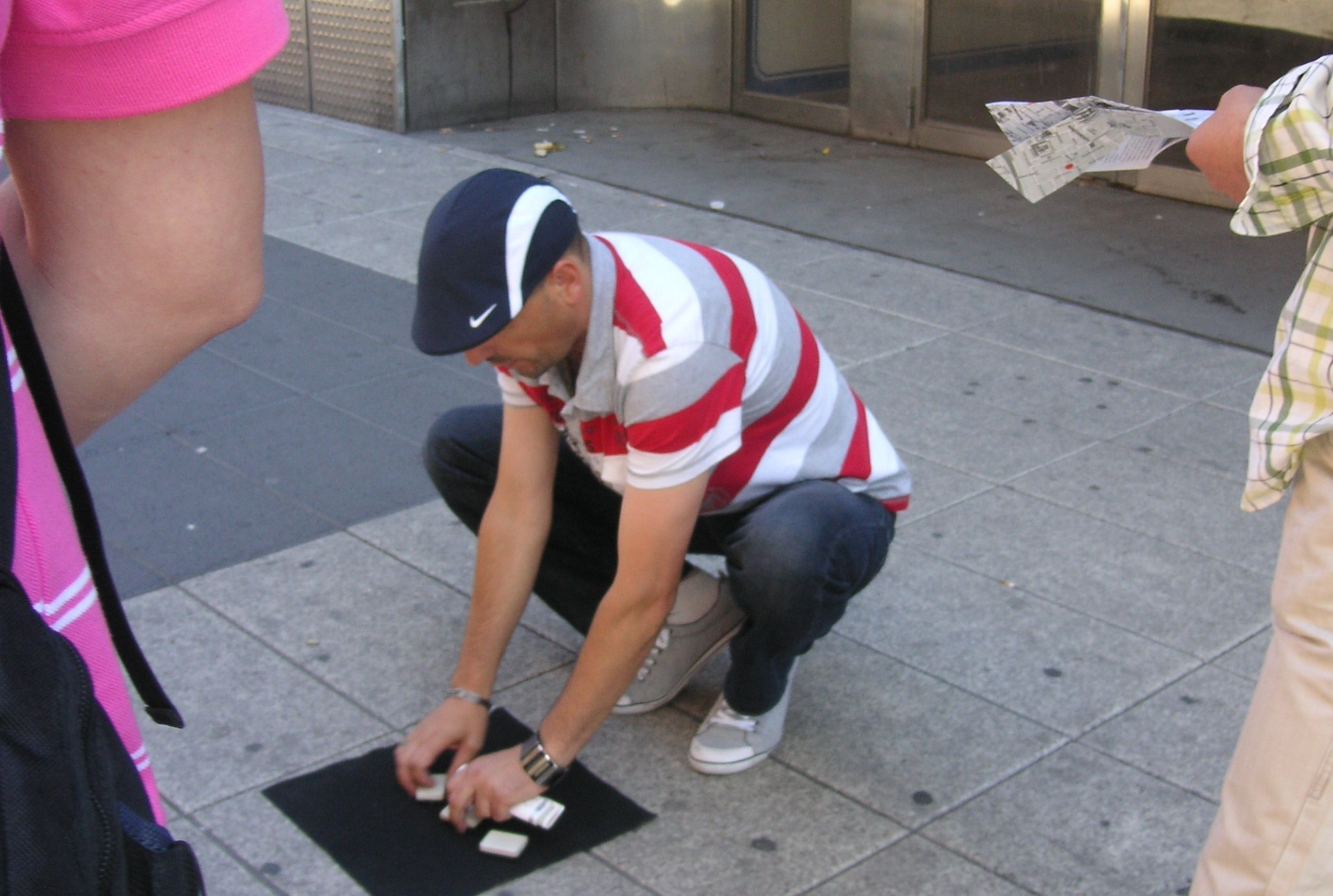
An illegal shell game in Drottninggatan, a street in Stockholm.

In the shell game, three or more identical containers (which may be cups, shells, bottle caps, or anything else) are placed face-down on a surface. A small ball is placed beneath one of these containers so that it cannot be seen, and they are then shuffled by the operator in plain view. One or more players are invited to bet on which container holds the ball – typically, the operator offers to double the player's stake if they guess right. Where the game is played honestly, the operator can win if they shuffle the containers in a way which the player cannot follow.

In practice, however, the shell game is notorious for its use by confidence tricksters who will typically rig the game using sleight of hand to move or hide the ball during play and replace it as required. Fraudulent shell games are also known for the use of psychological tricks to convince potential players of the legitimacy of the game – for example, by using shills or by allowing a player to win a few times before beginning the scam.

== History ==
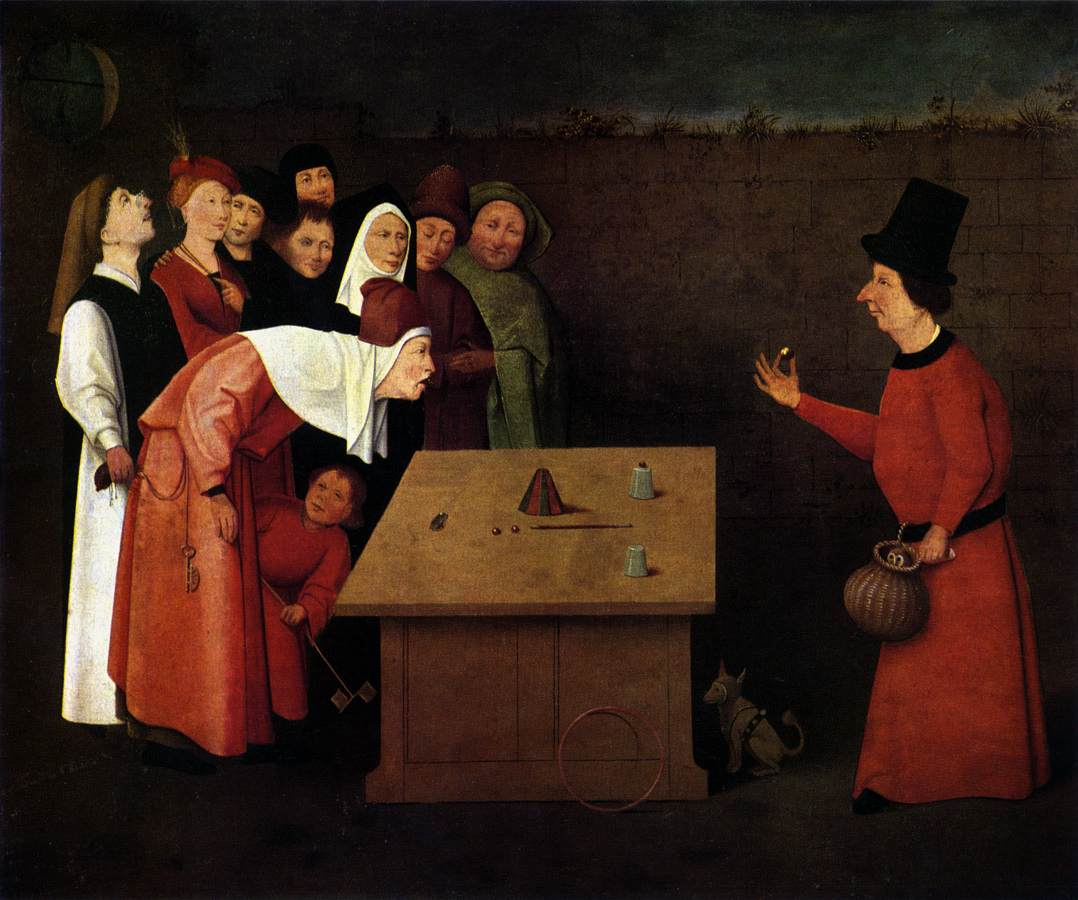
The Conjurer, painted by Hieronymus Bosch. The painting accurately displays a performer doing the cups and balls routine, which has been practiced since Egyptian times. The shell game does have some origins in this old trick. The real trick of this painting is the pickpocket who is working for the conjurer. The pickpocket is robbing the spectator who is bent over.

The shell game dates back at least to Ancient Greece. It can be seen in several paintings of the European Middle Ages. Later, walnut shells were used, and today the use of bottle caps or matchboxes is common. The game has also been called "thimblerig" as it could be played using sewing thimbles. The first recorded use of the term "thimblerig" is in 1826.

The swindle became very popular throughout the nineteenth century, and games were often set up in or around traveling fairs. A thimblerig team (comprising operator and confederates) was depicted in William Powell Frith's 1858 painting, The Derby Day. In Frith's 1888 My Autobiography and Reminiscences, the painter-turned-memoirist leaves an account of his encounter with a thimble-rig team (operator and accomplices):

My first visit to Epsom was in the May of 1856 – Blink Bonnie's year. My first Derby had no interest for me as a race, but as giving me the opportunity of studying life and character it is ever to be gratefully remembered. Gambling-tents and thimble-rigging, prick in the garter and the three-card trick, had not then been stopped by the police. So convinced was I that I could find the pea under the thimble that I was on the point of backing my guess rather heavily, when I was stopped by Augustus Egg, whose interference was resented by a clerical-looking personage, in language much opposed to what would have been anticipated from one of his cloth.

"You," said Egg, addressing the divine, "you are a confederate, you know; my friend is not to be taken in."

"Look here," said the clergyman, "don't you call names, and don't call me names, or I shall knock your d –– d head off."

"Will you?" said Egg, his courage rising as he saw two policemen approaching. "Then I call the lot of you – the Quaker there, no more a Quaker than I am, and that fellow that thinks he looks like a farmer – you are a parcel of thieves!"

"So they are, sir," said a meek-looking lad who joined us; "they have cleaned me out."

"Now move off; clear out of this!" said the police; and the gang walked away, the clergyman turning and extending his arms in the act of blessing me and Egg.

Fear of jail and the need to find new "flats" (victims) kept these "sharps" (shell men or "operators") traveling from one town to the next, never staying in one place very long. One of the most infamous confidence men of the nineteenth century, Jefferson Randolph Smith, known as Soapy Smith, led organized gangs of shell men throughout the mid-western United States, and later in Alaska.

Today, the game is still being played for money in many major cities around the world, usually at locations with a high tourist concentration (for example: La Rambla in Barcelona, Gran Via in Madrid, Westminster Bridge in London, Kurfürstendamm in Berlin, Bahnhofsviertel in Frankfurt am Main and public spaces in Paris, Buenos Aires, Benidorm, New York City, Chicago, and Los Angeles). The swindle is classified as a confidence trick game, and illegal to play for money in most countries.

The game also inspired a pricing game on the game show The Price Is Right, in which contestants attempt to win a larger prize by pricing smaller prizes to earn attempts at finding a ball hidden under one of four shells designed to resemble walnut shells. While the ball is not shown during the game, and the host shuffles the shells before the start of the game, contestants can win by either winning all four attempts or winning enough attempts (via big "chips" to mark the shells), and picking the one that has the ball. The shuffling is only allowed before the pricing part of the game begins, and once the first small prize is announced, no further shuffling is permitted. Federal game show regulations are designed to ensure the game is legally a game that can be won.

== See also ==
- Cups and balls routine
- Get-rich-quick scheme
- Three-card monte

== Bibliography ==
- Bishop, Glen, The Shellgame – For Tableside Tricksters, 2000
- Price, Paul, The Real Work: Essential Sleight Of Hand For Street Operators, 2001
- Whit Haydn and Chef Anton, Notes on Three-card Monte
- Perry, Richard Hull Elections
