= Generals Highway Corridor Park =

Park in Crownsville, Maryland, United States

Coordinates: 39°0′14″N 76°35′34″W

General's Highway Corridor Park is located at 1758 Crownsville Road, in the town of Crownsville, Maryland, United States. It is located near the site of the annual Maryland Renaissance Festival in the heart of Anne Arundel County.

The park is maintained by the Anne Arundel County Department of Recreation and Parks. Additional work – such as planting native plants and maintaining a nature trail – is provided by a group of volunteers called the General's Highway Environmental Project.

The park is open to the public all year round, from sunrise to sunset.

== Park information ==
- Ownership: Anne Arundel County Department of Recreation and Parks
- Address: 1758 Crownville Road, Crownsville, Maryland, 21401
- ADC Map location: page 19, grid E5
- Size: 99.6 acres (0.4 km^{2}; 0.2 sq mi)

== Facilities ==
Amenities	Number
Baseball diamonds	4
Multipurpose fields	2
Tennis courts	1
Picnic areas	1
Playground	1
Restrooms	2
