= Indian Creek School =

Coordinates: 39°3′53″N 76°36′22″W

Location
- 1130 Anne Chambers Way; Crownsville, Maryland 21032; United States

Information
- School type: Private, College-preparatory, Day
- Established: 1973; 53 years ago
- Founder: Anne Coleman Chambers
- Teaching staff: 75 (2020-2021)
- Grades: PK–12
- Gender: Coeducational
- Enrollment: 515 (2017-2018)
- Student to teacher ratio: 7:1 (2020-2021)
- Campus size: 114 acres (46 ha)
- Campus type: Suburban
- Colors: Green; White
- Athletics conference: IAAM; MIAA
- Mascot: The Eagles
- Accreditation: NAIS
- Website: www.indiancreekschool.org

Indian Creek School is a coeducational, university-preparatory school in Crownsville, Maryland. It serves students from pre-kindergarten through grade 12.

== History ==
=== Founding ===
Indian Creek School was founded in September 1973 by educators Anne Coleman Chambers and Rebecca Randolph. Both Coleman Chambers and Randolph had been teachers in the Prince George's County, Maryland, public school system, and they sought to establish a school with smaller class sizes in order to better challenge students. Coleman Chambers's parents donated land for the new school, which was constructed on a 17-acre (0.069 km^{2}) campus on Evergreen Road in Crownsville, Maryland. Her brother, Tracy Coleman Jr., assisted in construction and later served as Indian Creek's Director of Transportation and Physical Plant. Indian Creek School had an initial operating budget of $40,000.

Indian Creek started with 33 students across pre-K, kindergarten, and first grade, and four teachers. Anne Coleman Chambers served as the school's founding headmistress, and Rebecca Randolph served as Indian Creek's first assistant director, later becoming head of the Indian Creek Lower School.

=== Expansion ===
In 1977, Indian Creek added a middle school, increasing enrollment to 184. In 1977, the school had four buildings, six buses, 22 staff members, and a budget of $250,000. Indian Creek's first eighth-grade class graduated in 1979. By 1981, enrollment at Indian Creek had reached 230 students.

In 1983, beginning with the class of 1993, class size was doubled to 40 students per grade.

In 1993, a board of trustees was established and received ownership of the school to facilitate future institutional growth.

From its construction in 1973 through the early 2000s, Indian Creek's Evergreen Campus building gradually expanded, from about 5,000 square feet of space to about 80,000 square feet. This included a doubling of space in 1998, as Alumni Hall, locker rooms, and fourteen classrooms were added. With a staff of over 100, Indian Creek School was by 2004 one of the largest employers in Crownsville.

=== Construction of an Upper School ===
In August 2004, Indian Creek opened an upper school for students in grades nine through twelve. Indian Creek's founders had not originally planned to establish an upper school, focusing instead on pre-K through eighth-grade students. However, eighth-graders leaving Indian Creek often found it difficult to find the right high school, and many parents wanted an Indian Creek upper school, believing there to be no high school in the area with a similar educational philosophy. Population growth in Anne Arundel County first made this expansion feasible in the early 2000s. At first, sixteen original upper school students occupied one room on Indian Creek's Evergreen Campus, but in October 2004 these first upper school students relocated to vacant space at the Crownsville Hospital Center.

In 2004, Indian Creek School began construction of a $17 million, 96,000-square-foot Upper School building on a second campus in Crownsville, five miles away from the original campus. The site of the new campus was once a 114-acre tobacco farm owned by the Durner family. A portion was set aside for conservation. Indian Creek Upper School students moved to the new campus in September 2006, and Indian Creek graduated its first Upper School class, of 29 students, in 2008. The road constructed to provide access to the new Upper School building was named after founder Anne Coleman Chambers.

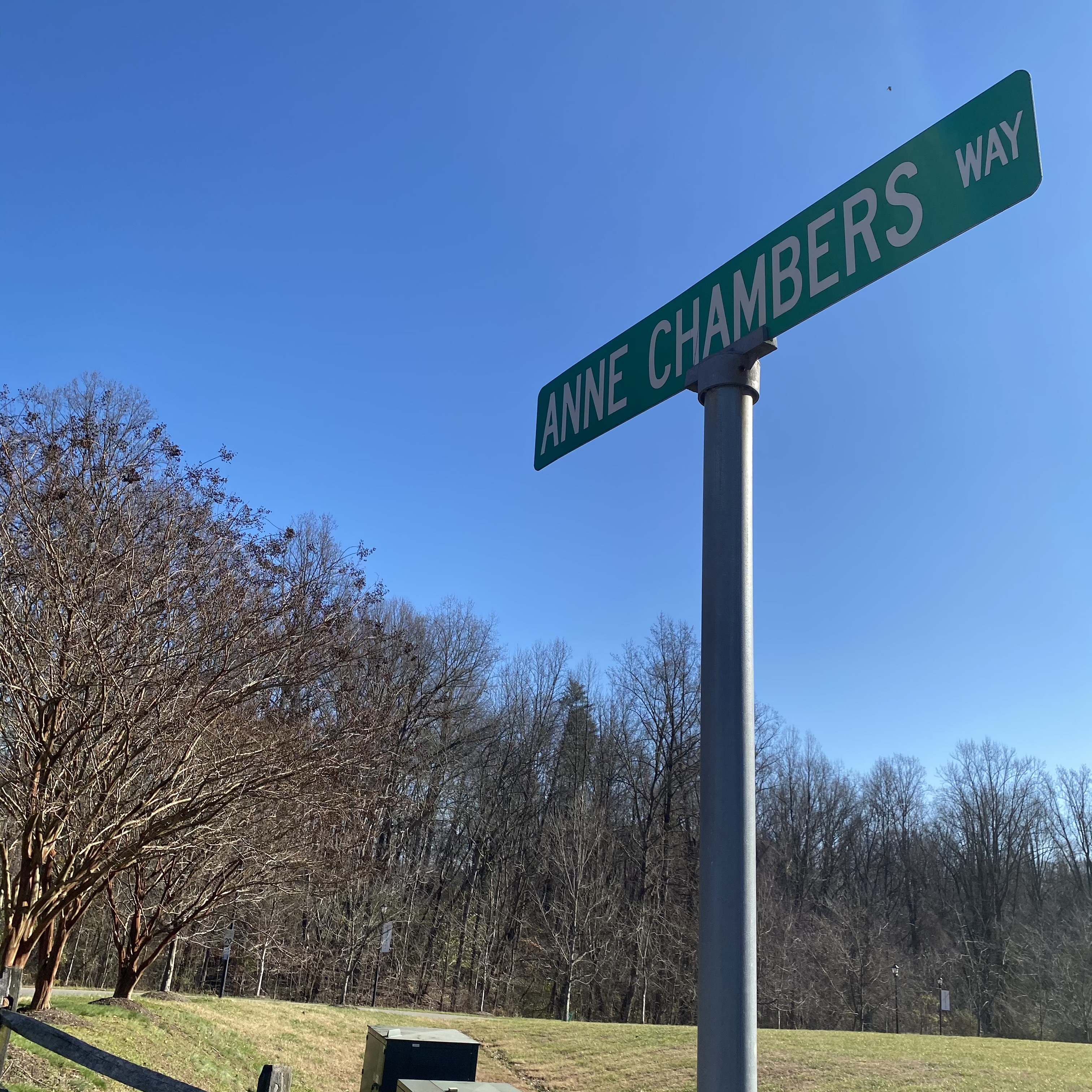
Anne Chambers Way street sign in Crownsville

Eileen Mattingly served as the first Upper School Head until 2009. She was succeeded by Gerard Connolly, who had previously served as head of Severn Upper School in Severna Park, Maryland and assistant headmaster of Washington Latin Public Charter School. In 2009, the Indian Creek Upper School had 170 students.

Lower School Head and Indian Creek co-founder Rebecca Randolph retired in 2007. In 2010, founder Anne Coleman Chambers stepped down as headmistress, after more than 37 years in that role. She taught psychology and human development at the Indian Creek Upper School for one year before retiring in 2011. Coleman Chambers was succeeded as head of school by interim head Lila Lohr. In 2011, Rick Branson, former headmaster of Hokkaido International School in Sapporo, Japan, became head of school.

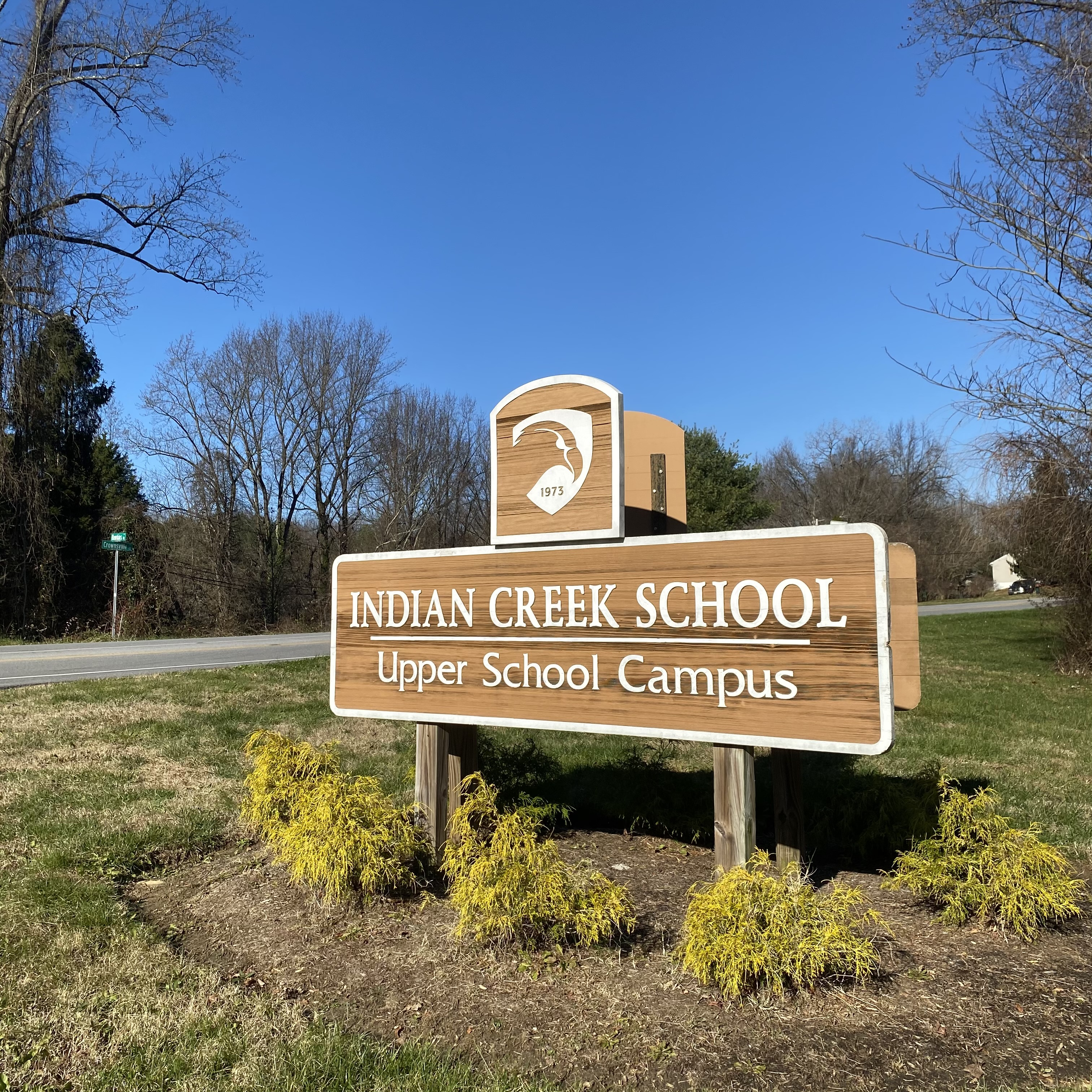
Sign at Indian Creek Upper School Campus entrance

In 2017, Indian Creek moved its seventh and eighth grade students from the original Evergreen campus to the new Upper School campus. In 2019, the school sold the Evergreen campus to Rockbridge Academy while continuing to lease part of the building to house students in pre-K through sixth grade for two years until fall 2021, when the student body was unified on the Anne Chambers Way campus.

In 2019, Booth Kyle, former Associate Head of Lakeside School, replaced Rick Branson as Head of Indian Creek School.

== Academics ==
There is a four-year STEM program at the Indian Creek Upper School, which is focused on independent research. Participating students complete one-year independent research projects in their first and second years, followed by a two-year STEM thesis in their junior and senior years.

Indian Creek's Voros Senior Thesis in the Humanities program provides seniors the opportunity to write a 40-60 page thesis in the humanities or social sciences with the guidance of a faculty member. Seniors who elect to complete a thesis must then defend it in front of a panel of faculty and guest experts. The program was founded by and named in honor of faculty member Chip Voros. Past theses have addressed topics in subjects including economics, gender studies, and medical anthropology.

All Indian Creek Upper School students must learn a foreign language. Students can take Spanish or Latin on-campus, or study Japanese or Arabic through the Global Online Academy.

In 2019, Indian Creek was awarded the AP Computer Science Female Diversity Award by the College Board, recognizing high female participation in computer science classes.

== Educational philosophy ==
Founders Anne Coleman Chambers and Rebecca Randolph based Indian Creek School's educational approach on research in neuroscience and cognitive development. In 2001, the school began working with All Kinds of Minds, an education research nonprofit. Since then, the school has trained its teachers in the All Kinds of Minds, neuroscience-based program, which focuses on understanding different learning styles and promoting collaboration between students, parents, and teachers. As part of the approach, students have a different teacher for each subject, and a learner profile is developed for each student as they progress each year.

Under Coleman Chambers and Randolph, Indian Creek School began teaching Spanish and computer classes, starting at the kindergarten level, before this was common. Indian Creek also developed a focus on project-based learning.

At the Indian Creek Middle School, Coleman Chambers created extended day-care into the early evening, before this existed at many other schools, after research indicated it was healthy for students. When establishing the Upper School, Coleman Chambers scheduled the school day to take place from 9 a.m. to 5 p.m. in order to best match the circadian rhythms of teenage students.

Coleman Chambers developed a human development curriculum influenced by research in developmental psychology and addressing topics including civil discourse, emotional maturatity, drugs, sexuality, and external influences on students as they grow up. The program was also designed to support different children's different needs. After establishing human development education at Indian Creek, Coleman Chambers also helped develop the human development program at Severn School.

In 2001, Indian Creek established a free, three-week summer day camp called Students Taking Academic Responsibility, or STARs, for disadvantaged middle school-aged kids in the Annapolis area, including from Annapolis's public housing communities. Coleman Chambers saw the camp as part of Indian Creek School's mission of giving back to the local community, particularly wanting to help kids who could otherwise be missed in large classroom settings. In the camp's human development classes, campers discussed decision-making, college, and challenges facing kids their age. After starting with about 20 campers in 2001, by 2010 there were 56 campers, and STARs had moved to the Indian Creek Upper School campus. For the first time, in 2010, donations paid for the program, which was previously paid for by the school. STARs also began offering scholarships to Indian Creek School to some campers; full tuition in that year was $21,000. Former Indian Creek School student Will Bartz became involved with STARs in 2005, after growing unsatisfied with his job as a financial adviser and returning to Coleman Chambers for advice. By 2010, Bartz had become director of the STARs program, also teaching math and coaching basketball at Indian Creek.

Under Coleman Chambers, a "Character Counts" program was developed at the Indian Creek Lower School to impart values including respect, kindness, honesty, and responsibility, while middle school students began starting each year with fall camping trips, designed to promote team-building and student-faculty interaction.

In an interview with The Baltimore Sun in 1981, Coleman Chambers distinguished Indian Creek School from more college preparatory-focused primary schools in valuing a wide variety of student goals and interests. She noted that preschool students were admitted on a first-come, first-serve basis, rather than based on test results.

In 2014, Indian Creek School established a program called Blended Learning at Indian Creek, or BLinc, in which faculty offer supplemental courses with some in-person teaching and some online, asynchronous components. Beginning with only two summer courses, the BLinc program expanded to 22 courses offered year-round in 2016.

== Co-curricular activities ==
All Indian Creek students are required to participate in a co-curricular activity after school, under a trimester system.

=== Athletics ===
The Indian Creek Eagles compete in eleven varsity sports: sailing, cross country, equestrian, field hockey, soccer, volleyball, basketball, baseball, golf, lacrosse, and tennis. Women's teams compete in the Interscholastic Athletic Association of Maryland (IAAM) and men's teams compete in the Maryland Interscholastic Athletic Association (MIAA). The Eagles sailing team is based in Annapolis. All students at the Upper School are required to participate in at least one sport each year, either in the fall, winter, or spring.

In 2016, Indian Creek completed construction on a $4 million athletics complex with two turf fields, tennis courts, and a baseball diamond. The complex seats 500 people. In 2020, Indian Creek School added the Eagle Dome, a $1 million, 27,000-square foot air-supported dome, in order to expand practice space and enable tennis and other sports to be played during inclement weather. Indian Creek's campus also contains a 3.1 mile wooded cross country trail and a marley-floored dance studio.

=== Extracurricular activities ===
Other extracurricular groups at Indian Creek School include Gay-Straight Alliance, a Key Club International chapter, Model UN, and other student organizations.

At the Upper School level, members of the Indian Creek math team compete in math competitions.

They also compete in robotics competitions.

The Upper School has a fall play and spring musical, as well as many concerts, recitals, competitions, and arts nights to help create a culture of deep appreciation for the arts.

== See also ==
- Anne Coleman Chambers
- Free school movement
- Schools Attuned
