= Anne Chambers =

Anne Chambers may refer to:

- Anne Cox Chambers (1919–2020), media proprietor
- Anne Chambers (author), Irish historian and author
- Anne Coleman Chambers (1940–2020), American educator
- Ann Chambers, New Democratic Party candidate in the 2008 Canadian federal election
