= Rockbridge Academy =

Location
- 680 Evergreen Road; Crownsville, Maryland 21032; USA; 39.0644°N 76.6058°W

Information
- Type: Private
- Motto: In captivitatem redigentes omnem intellectum (Taking every thought captive, 2 Corinthians 10:5)
- Religious affiliation: Protestant Christian
- Established: 1995
- Headmaster: Roy Griffith
- Faculty: 60
- Grades: K–12
- Enrollment: 415
- Campus: suburban
- Mascot: Scots
- Accreditation: Association of Classical and Christian Schools
- Tuition: $7,800 - $18,500
- Website: www.rockbridge.org

Rockbridge Academy is a private, nonprofit, K–12, classical Christian school near Annapolis in Anne Arundel County, Maryland. Founded in 1995, the school has approximately 380 pupils on roll.

== History and details ==
Rockbridge utilizes the Trivium method of education, and bases instruction on a Christian worldview. Junior Kindergarten through 8th grade students average one to two years above the national average on the Stanford Achievement Test, and seniors average above 1300 on the SAT.

The school's extracurricular activities include athletics, a yearly theatrical production, instrumental and vocal music programs, Science Olympiad, debate, and other clubs. All grade levels take field trips to various locations, and rising seniors have the opportunity to participate in a summer tour of historic and cultural sites in Greece and Italy. The final two years of the curriculum incorporate a year-long thesis project on a topic of the student's choosing as a culmination of the learning process.

The school purchased its current Crownsville campus and buildings in 2021 from another private school, Indian Creek. The Rockbridge lower and upper schools share the same building space.

Each year Rockbridge Academy offers a Teacher Training Program endorsed by the Association of Classical and Christian Schools. This program features workshops offered by experienced educators training teachers at the grammar, dialectic, and rhetoric levels in a variety of subject areas.
