= Whit Haydn =

American magician (born 1949)

Whit "Pop" Haydn
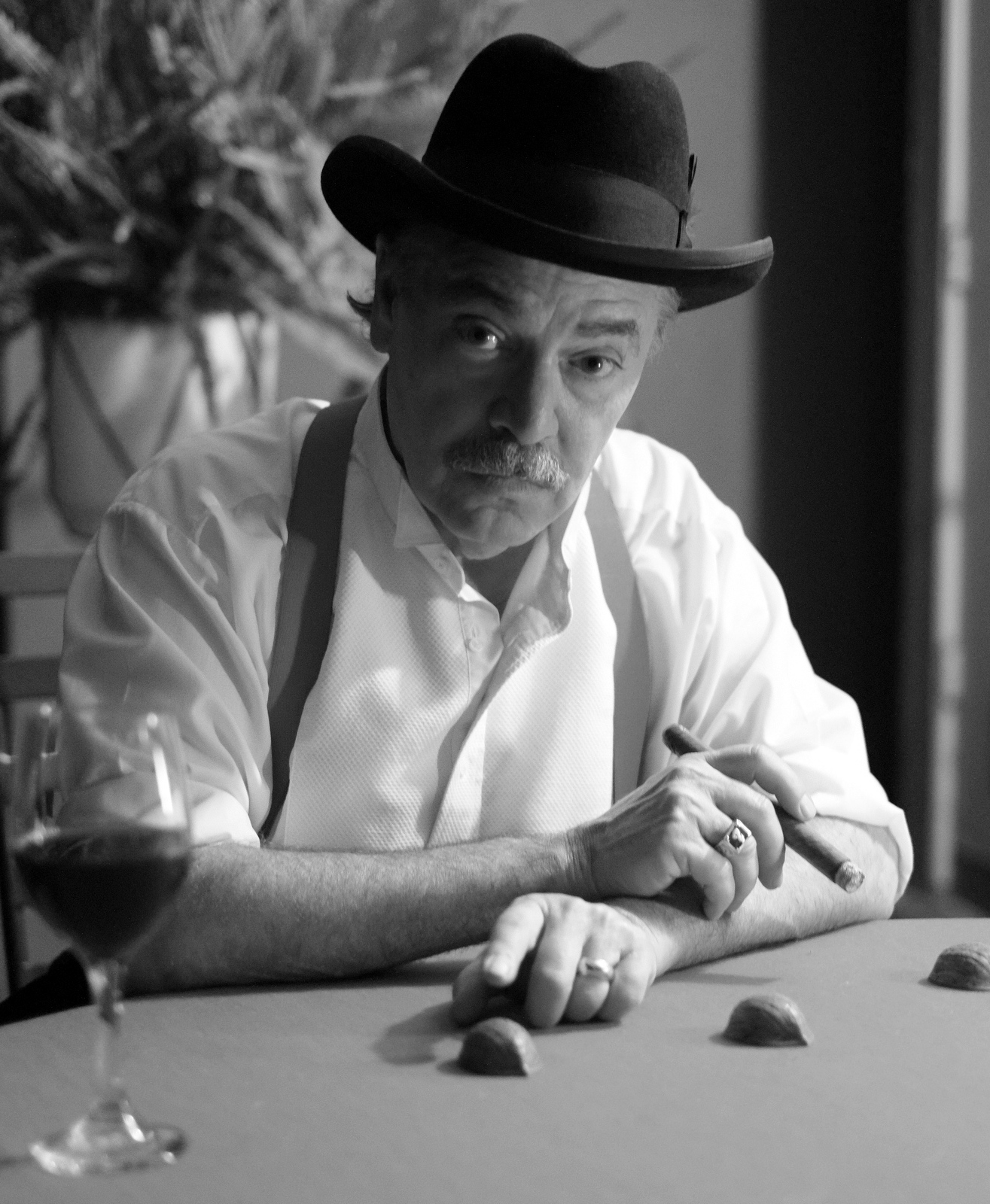
- Haydn with the Shells and Pea
- Born: July 19, 1949 (age 77); Clarksville, Tennessee, U.S.
- Education: East Carolina University
- Occupation: Magician

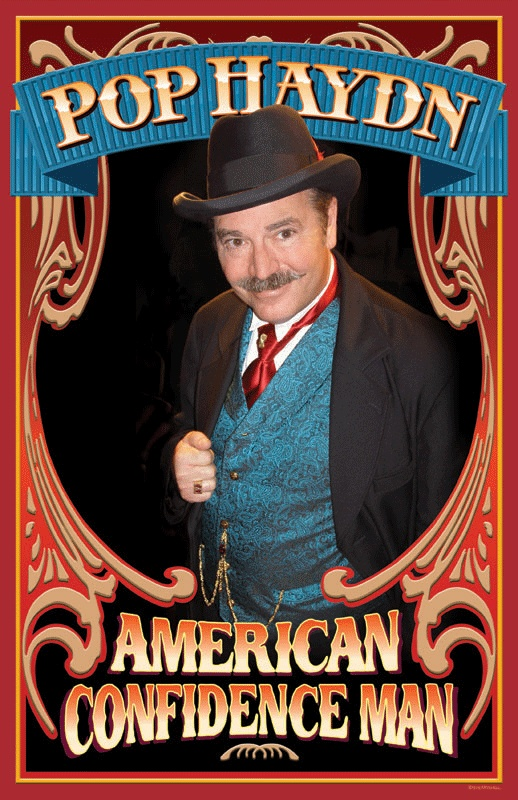
Pop Haydn, American Confidence Man

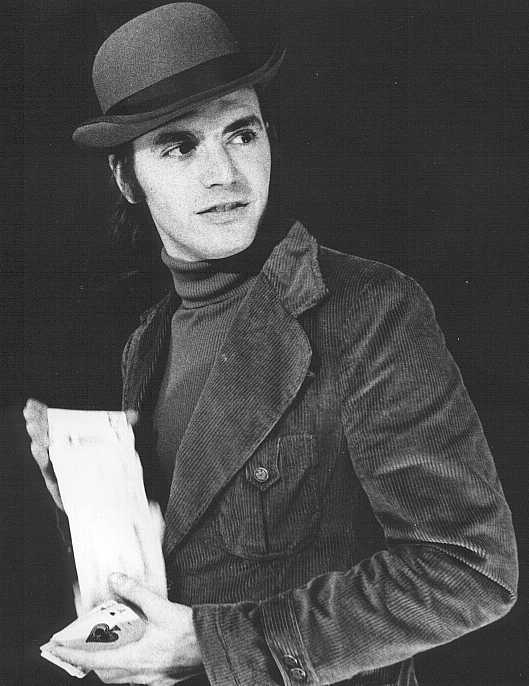
1973, in his street-performance days

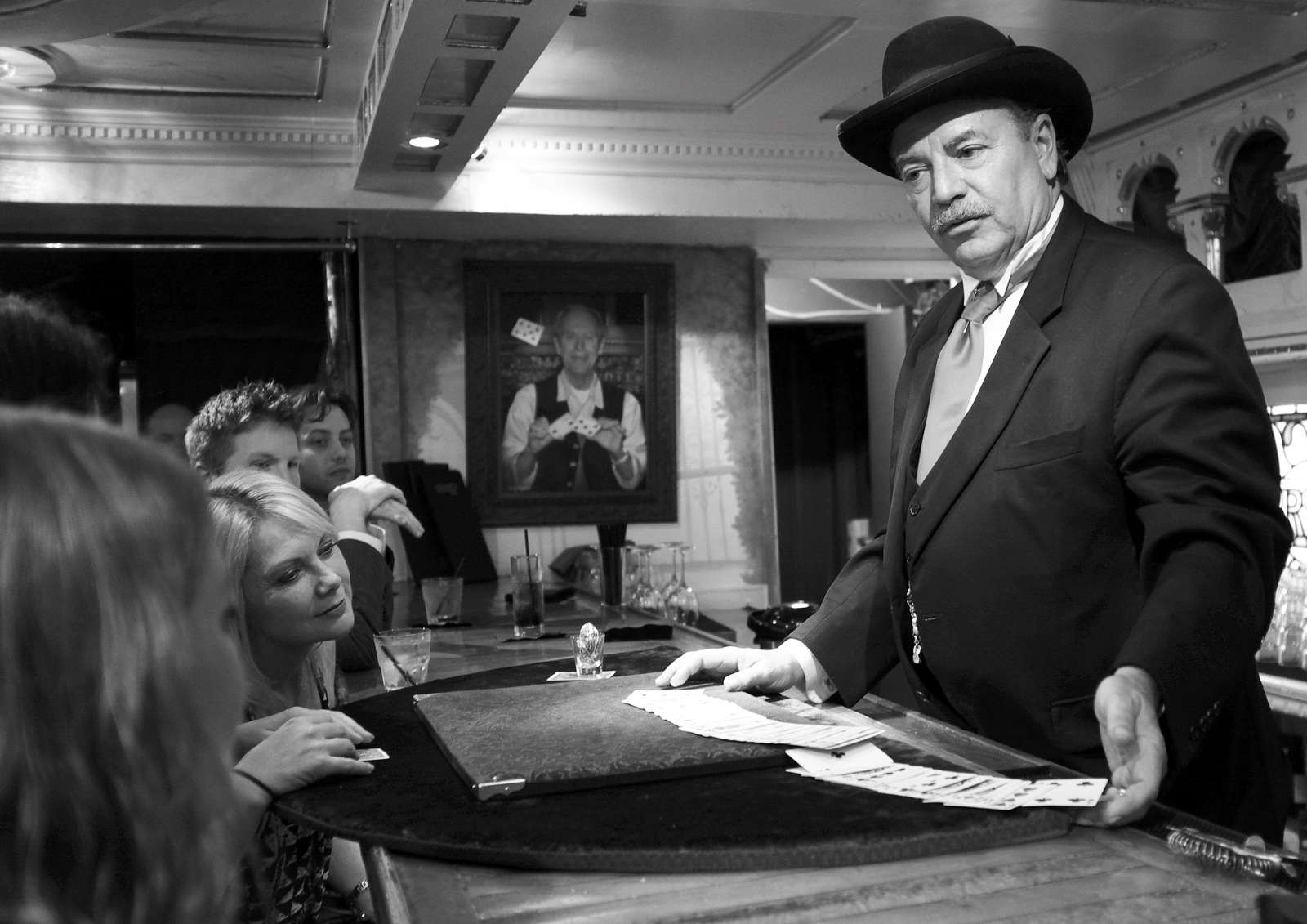
Haydn in the W.C. Fields Bar, Magic Castle

Whit "Pop" Haydn (born July 19, 1949 as Whitney Wesley Hadden in Clarksville, Tennessee) is an American magician, and the winner of seven performing awards (for performances in showrooms at the Magic Castle) from the Academy of Magical Arts. He has been nominated by his fellow members for "Magician of the Year" in Close-Up, Parlor and Stage, Bar and Lecturer more than thirty times. In February 2006, he also became Vice-President of that organization, and served for four years in that capacity.

He has opened for Jerry Seinfeld, the Smothers Brothers, Loretta Lynn and others, and performed on cruise ships of many different lines, including Cunard Line's Queen Elizabeth 2, and the Diamond Princess. Haydn has worked hotels and casinos including Caesars Tahoe, and was one of the first acts chosen in 1996 to open Caesar's Magical Empire in Las Vegas.

In recent years, he has adopted the persona of an "expatriate con man and medicine show huckster from the early 20th century," and he has headlined such venues as the World Steam Expo. In September 2012 he sat on a panel, at Stan Lee's Comikaze Expo on the subject of the steampunk subculture and its relation to other subcultures.

== Life ==
Whit Haydn was born to minister (Disciples of Christ) William J. Hadden, Jr. and Margaret Shumate (daughter of Whitney Shumate and Jessamine Shumate), an elementary school librarian. At a summer camp at the age of 10, Haydn witnessed a magic show by a Methodist minister who was an amateur magician, and Haydn reportedly stayed up all night trying to figure out what he had seen. This became the beginning of a lifelong fascination.

Three local North Carolina magicians—Dick Snavely of Raleigh, Bill Tadlock of Rocky Mount, and Wallace Lee of Durham—became mentors for the young magician. At fourteen, he borrowed money for a bus ticket to one of the major American magic conventions, Abbott's Get Together in Colon, Michigan, having convinced his parents to let him take the long bus ride alone.

He graduated from JH Rose High School in Greenville, North Carolina, and attended college at East Carolina University in the 1960s, where he also became heavily involved in the civil rights and anti-war movements. He left college in 1969 to challenge the draft, and became one of Pitt County's first conscientious objectors. He did some alternative service at New York University Hospital, but after being released from C.O. status, and the job, when he flunked the physical (due to poor eyesight), he started doing street magic in the West Village.

In 1970, he went back to school at Lynchburg College in Virginia, receiving a B.A. degree in philosophy and comparative religion in 1972, after which he attended Virginia Theological Seminary in Alexandria, Virginia to become an Episcopalian priest, though he continued performing magic to help support himself at the school.

Reginald H. Fuller, a well-known New Testament scholar, saw one of Haydn's performances at a student/faculty party, and suggested that Haydn's passion might lie not in the ministry, but in magic. A few weeks later, Haydn dropped out of the seminary and turned to magic full-time. Working as an actor/juggler/magician with a touring political theater under the direction of Bob Leonard, The Road Company, Haydn continued to develop his magic performances.

In the mid-1970s he performed at the prestigious Magic Castle, where the Master of Ceremonies, Billy McComb, stumbled over the name "Hadden", so he, Dai Vernon, Kuda Bux and some other well-known magicians encouraged Hadden to change his name to something easier to pronounce. They settled on "Haydn"—pronounced as "Hāden." McComb became a mentor and major influence on Haydn's career.

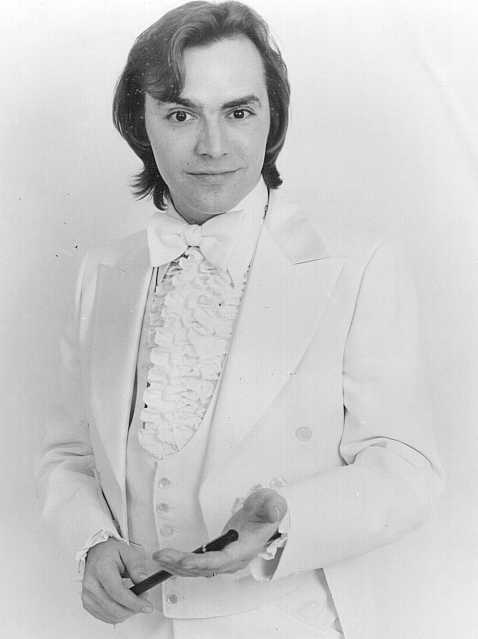
1979, "Stage Magician of the Year"

Haydn is the co-founder (with Chef Anton) of the "School for Scoundrels". Since 1996, this program has held a four-week course once a year at the Magic Castle in Hollywood, to teach magicians, gambling experts and law enforcement officers the history, psychology and methods of street scams such as Three-Card Monte, Fast and Loose, and the Shell Game.

Haydn currently lives in Los Angeles with his wife, Nancy Magill. They work together on Pop Haydn in the 21st Century – a live theatrical variety show. In this steampunk-oriented reinvention of a 1910 medicine show, Pop sells his Amazing Miracle Oil, pitches Magnetized Water, demonstrates the ability of a Tesla Coil to bend the force of gravity with the help of Tesla Girl and reads people's past and future through the Sphere of Destiny.

Whit is named for his grandfather, Whitney Shumate, and is the grandson of artist Jessamine Shumate. He has one grown daughter, Jessamine, and two grandchildren, Carmen and Jack.

== Awards ==
- The Academy of Magical Arts Stage Magician of the Year (1979, 2014)
- The Academy of Magical Arts Parlour Magician of the Year (1995, 2002)
- The Academy of Magical Arts Close-Up Magician of the Year (2003, 2004)
- The Academy of Magical Arts Bar Magician of the Year (2005)

== Works ==
- Stories of a Street Performer published by Mikazuki Publishing House. Copyright 2012. Contents: Street magic—Street stories—ESP survey—Squash! -- The impromptu card code: a routine for the blind—The lessons of the street. ISBN 9781937981303 and ISBN 9781937981334. OCLC 870599233 and OCLC 861735947. Abstract: Whit "Pop" Haydn, six-time award winning magician and former Vice President of the world famous Magic Castle, shares his over 40 years of experiences performing magic all around the world. Stories of a street performer is a classic tale and a must read. This book is filled with vital lessons for the up-and-coming performer and life lessons that all can learn from. Whether you are an aspiring performer, a fan of magicians, or a seeker of exciting stories, this is one book you will not be able to put down.
- The Chicago Surprise copyright 2000
- Street Magic copyright 2001
- The Intricate Web of Distraction copyright 2001, also VHS and DVD
- The Mongolian Pop-Knot, copyright 1982 also VHS
- Comedy Four-Ring Routine, copyright 1976 also VHS and DVD
- Trio in Gold, East Carolina Poetry Forum Press, 1968
- Tar River Poets, East Carolina Poetry Forum Press, 1969

=== With Chef Anton ===
- School for Scoundrels Notes on Three-Card Monte, also VHS and DVD
- Introduction to the Shell Game, DVD. Abstract: In November 2004, Bob Sheets, Whit Haydn and Chef Anton combined their original methods for the ancient swindle, the Shell Game, and taught this new system to the School for Scoundrels class at the Magic Castle.
- Scoundrel's Touch, DVD
- School for Scoundrels Notes on Fast and Loose, also VHS and DVD
