= Anne Coleman Chambers =

American educator (1940–2020)

- Born: Anne Coleman; July 31, 1940; Baltimore, Maryland, U.S.
- Died: October 12, 2020 (aged 80); Hagerstown, Maryland, U.S.
- Education: Sherwood High School (Maryland); University of Maryland, College Park (BA)
- Occupation: Educator
- Known for: Founder of Indian Creek School
- Children: 1

Anne Coleman Chambers (1940–2020) was an American educator who founded Indian Creek School, a coeducational, private day school in Crownsville, Maryland, and served as the school's first head of school from 1973 until 2010. Her focus on human development and research-based education methods affected pre-K–12 education at Indian Creek School and other private schools in Maryland.

== Early life and education ==
Anne Coleman Chambers was born Anne Coleman in Baltimore, Maryland, to Tracy Coleman Sr., owner of a construction company in Silver Spring, and Virginia Coleman. Coleman Chambers was raised in Colesville, Maryland, and attended Sherwood High School in Sandy Spring. She earned a Bachelor of Arts degree from the University of Maryland, College Park, before becoming a teacher in the Prince George's County, Maryland, public school system in 1963.

== Founding Indian Creek School ==
While teaching and counseling in the Prince George's County public school system, Coleman Chambers grew frustrated with what she viewed as excess bureaucracy, class sizes that were too large, and students reaching high school with insufficient reading and math preparation. As a result, she cofounded Indian Creek School in 1973 with Rebecca Randolph, another Prince George's County public school teacher, and her brother, Tracy "Punky" Coleman, Jr., with 33 original students in pre-K, kindergarten, and first grade. The school began with four teachers. Coleman Chambers became the first headmistress of Indian Creek School, a role she would fill until 2010, and Randolph served as Assistant Director, later becoming principal of the Indian Creek Lower School.

Coleman Chambers' parents donated land for the new school and covered the mortgage payments the first year, and Tracy Coleman, Jr. was involved in the school's construction on a 17-acre campus on Evergreen Road in Crownsville, Maryland, near Annapolis. Tracy Coleman, Jr. would also serve as Indian Creek School's first Director of Transportation and Physical Plant.

== Headmistress of Indian Creek School ==
In 1977, Indian Creek added a middle school, increasing enrollment to 184. By 1977, the school had 22 staff members. The middle school graduated its first eighth-grade class in 1979, and by 1981, enrollment at Indian Creek School had increased to 230 students.

Coleman Chambers was a longtime friend of Dr. Jane R. Snider, an educator who in 1982 founded a consulting practice in Annapolis working with children facing difficulties in learning to read. When Snider, who founded the Summit School, another private school in Maryland, at first encountered problems obtaining county government approval, Coleman Chambers let her open the school in trailers on three acres of land behind Indian Creek. Summit School later moved to Upper Marlboro and then, in 1995, to its current location in Edgewater, Maryland.

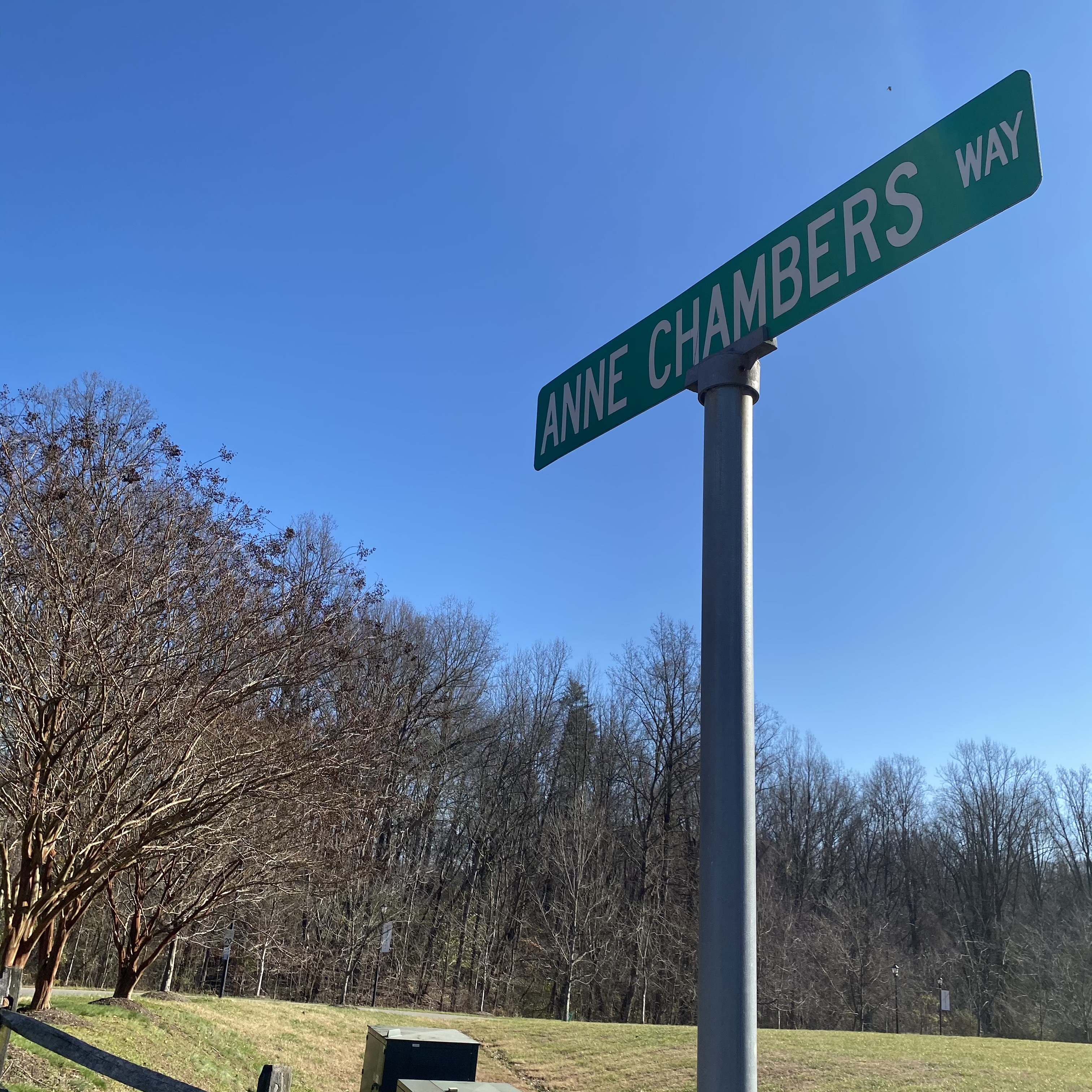
Anne Chambers Way street sign in Crownsville

In 2004, Indian Creek School began construction of a new Upper School building on a second campus in Crownsville. A road constructed to provide access to the new Upper School building was named after Coleman Chambers; its street address is 1300 Anne Chambers Way.

In spring 2010, Coleman Chambers stepped down as headmistress of Indian Creek School, after more than 37 years in that role. She taught psychology and human development at the Indian Creek Upper School for one year before retiring in 2011.

== Personal life and death ==
Coleman Chambers was a longstanding singer with the Annapolis Chorale, contributing to her support of the arts at Indian Creek School.

Coleman Chambers had one son, Kenny, from a marriage with Bill Chambers, which ended in divorce. She died on October 12, 2020, at the age of 80, in Hagerstown, Maryland.

== See also ==
- Educational Psychology
- Free school movement
- Indian Creek School
- Schools Attuned
