= Mary E. Moss Academy =

Location
- 45 Community Place; Crownsville, Maryland
- Coordinates: 39°1′36″N 76°36′17″W

Information
- School type: Other/alternative school
- School district: Anne Arundel County Public Schools
- Principal: Wendy Slaughter
- Grades: 6-9
- Website: School website

Mary E. Moss Academy is a public, alternative education program serving 6th through 9th grade students residing in Anne Arundel County, Maryland. Most Mary Moss students attend the school at student or parent request, or after extended suspension or expulsion.

== Location ==
Mary E. Moss Academy is located on the grounds of the former Crownsville Hospital, just off Rt. 178/Generals Hwy.

== PBIS ==
PBIS – or "Positive Behavioral Interventions & Supports" – is a school wide program that promotes positive behavior and academic improvement through targeted strategies. Mary E. Moss Academy has been a PBIS school since 2003. Students earn "MEMA" dollars for demonstrating respect for themselves, learning, others and property. They use the MEMAs they have earned to make purchases at the MEMA store once a week.
