= Gibeciere =

Large pouch or small satchel

A gibeciere is a large pouch or small satchel for keeping ready access to small equipment when on the move.

== Uses ==
=== Hunting (historical) ===
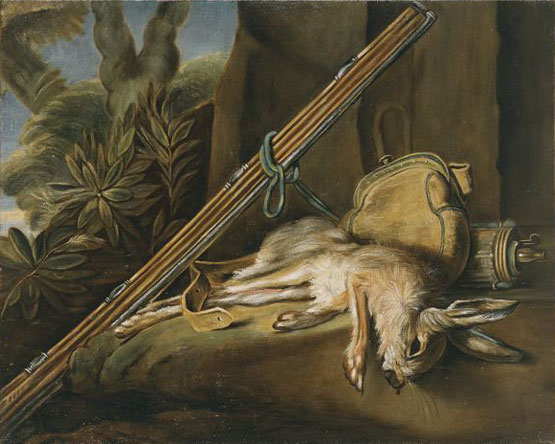
An 18th century painting by Jean Siméon Chardin shows a gibeciere used as a game (hunting) bag

Hunters using a muzzleloader used a gibeciere for easy access to their gunpowder, wadding, gunflint, and other equipment.

=== Magic ===
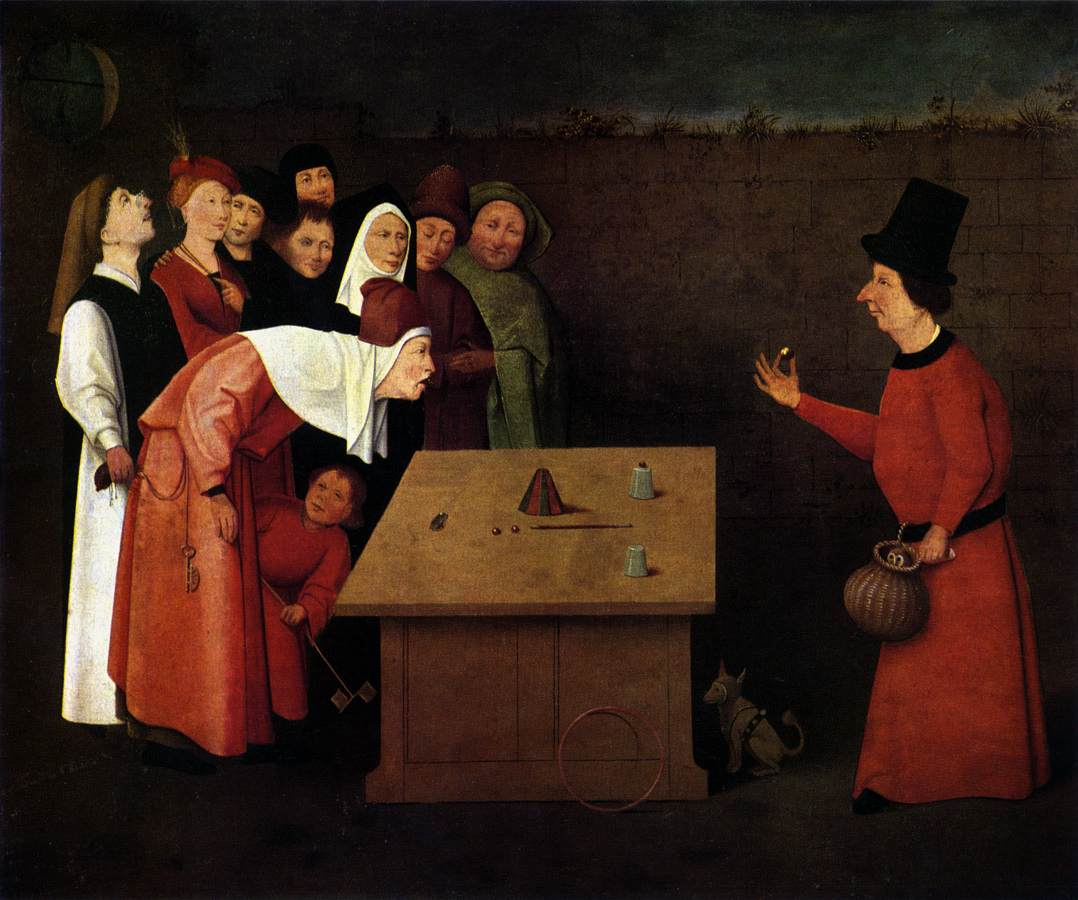
The Conjurer by Hieronymus Bosch, showing among other things a gibeciere on the performer's waist.

A gibeciere is used by magicians to carry their repertoire, or as a utility device. It is still used in modern times by street magicians to ease transporting props on one's person.

It is commonly held around the performer's waist by a belt, and the pouch commonly rests along the front of the body, just below the waistline.
