= Schools Attuned =

The Schools Attuned to All Kinds of Minds Program was a research-based professional development program for educators administered by the nonprofit organization All Kinds of Minds Institute. Using a neurodevelopmental framework for learning, it was designed to help educators understand students' learning profiles and provides the knowledge, tools, and skills needed to help frustrated students become more successful in school.
