= Crownsville, Maryland =

- Census-designated place
- Location of Crownsville, Maryland,
- Coordinates: 39°1′27″N 76°35′54″W
- Country: United States
- State: Maryland
- County: Anne Arundel

Area
  - Total: 5.09 sq mi (13.19 km^{2})
  - Land: 5.09 sq mi (13.19 km^{2})
  - Water: 0 sq mi (0.00 km^{2})
- Elevation: 121 ft (37 m)

Population (2020)
  - Total: 1,924
  - Density: 377.9/sq mi (145.91/km^{2})
- Time zone: UTC−5 (Eastern (EST))
  - Summer (DST): UTC−4 (EDT)
- ZIP code: 21032
- Area code: 410
- FIPS code: 24-21075
- GNIS feature ID: 0590052

Crownsville is a census-designated place (CDP) in Anne Arundel County, Maryland, United States. The population was 1,757 at the 2010 census. Formally, it is part of the Baltimore Metropolitan Area. It hosts the Anne Arundel County Fair each September, as well as the annual Maryland Renaissance Festival for several summer weekends. A state psychiatric hospital was formerly in Crownsville. The area offers waterfront scenery and easy access to urban metropolitan areas and culture.

== Geography ==
Crownsville is located at 39°1′27″N 76°35′54″W (39.024149, −76.598295), 7 miles (11 km) northwest of Annapolis, the state capital. Maryland Route 178 (Generals Highway) runs through the center of the CDP, and Interstate 97 forms the southwestern edge of the CDP, with access from the north via Exit 5.

According to the United States Census Bureau, the CDP has a total area of 5.1 square miles (13.2 km^{2}), all land. However, waterfront communities such as Arden on the Severn and Herald Harbor have Crownsville addresses.

== Demographics ==
Historical population
Census	Pop.	Note	%±
2000	1,670		—
2010	1,757		5.2%
2020	1,924		9.5%
U.S. Decennial Census

=== 2020 census ===
As of the 2020 census, Crownsville had a population of 1,924. The median age was 46.5 years. 19.6% of residents were under the age of 18 and 20.5% of residents were 65 years of age or older. For every 100 females there were 96.9 males, and for every 100 females age 18 and over there were 95.6 males age 18 and over.

15.5% of residents lived in urban areas, while 84.5% lived in rural areas.

There were 655 households in Crownsville, of which 22.4% had children under the age of 18 living in them. Of all households, 61.2% were married-couple households, 13.6% were households with a male householder and no spouse or partner present, and 19.5% were households with a female householder and no spouse or partner present. About 22.2% of all households were made up of individuals and 14.1% had someone living alone who was 65 years of age or older.

There were 696 housing units, of which 5.9% were vacant. The homeowner vacancy rate was 0.9% and the rental vacancy rate was 6.5%.

Racial composition as of the 2020 census
Race	Number	Percent
White	1,325	68.9%
Black or African American	125	6.5%
American Indian and Alaska Native	8	0.4%
Asian	32	1.7%
Native Hawaiian and Other Pacific Islander	0	0.0%
Some other race	243	12.6%
Two or more races	191	9.9%
Hispanic or Latino (of any race)	326	16.9%

=== 2000 census ===
As of the census of 2000, there were 1,670 people, 485 households, and 392 families residing in the CDP. The population density was 300.7 inhabitants per square mile (116.1/km^{2}). There were 516 housing units at an average density of 92.9 per square mile (35.9/km^{2}). The racial makeup of the CDP was 80.36% White, 15.45% African American, 0.78% Native American, 1.50% Asian, 0.06% Pacific Islander, 0.66% from other races, and 1.20% from two or more races. Hispanic or Latino of any race were 1.62% of the population.

There were 485 households, out of which 31.5% had children under the age of 18 living with them, 70.5% were married couples living together, 7.6% had a female householder with no husband present, and 19.0% were non-families. 14.6% of all households were made up of individuals, and 4.1% had someone living alone who was 65 years of age or older. The average household size was 2.65 and the average family size was 2.90.

In the CDP, the population was spread out, with 19.4% under the age of 18, 7.4% from 18 to 24, 32.0% from 25 to 44, 32.6% from 45 to 64, and 8.6% who were 65 years of age or older. The median age was 41 years. For every 100 females, there were 111.9 males. For every 100 females age 18 and over, there were 110.3 males.

The median income for a household in the CDP was $91,180, and the median income for a family was $99,553. Males had a median income of $87,035 versus $32,344 for females. The per capita income for the CDP was $37,509. About 4.3% of families and 11.2% of the population were below the poverty line, including none of those under age 18 and 18.1% of those age 65 or over.

In 2000, 4% of Crownsville residents identified as being of Lebanese heritage. This was the highest percentage of Lebanese Americans outside of Michigan.

== Local schools ==
Schools located in Crownsville and the surrounding area are:

- South Shore Elementary School (K through 5th grade) (Anne Arundel County Public School)
- Millersville Elementary (K through 5th grade) (Anne Arundel County Public School)
- Indian Creek School (Pre-K through 12th grade) (private)
- Mary E. Moss Academy (9th–10th grade, alternative high school) (Anne Arundel County Public Schools)
- Arundel High School (9th–12th grade) (Anne Arundel County Public Schools)
- Old Mill High School (9th–12th grade) (Anne Arundel County Public Schools)

== Parks and recreation facilities ==
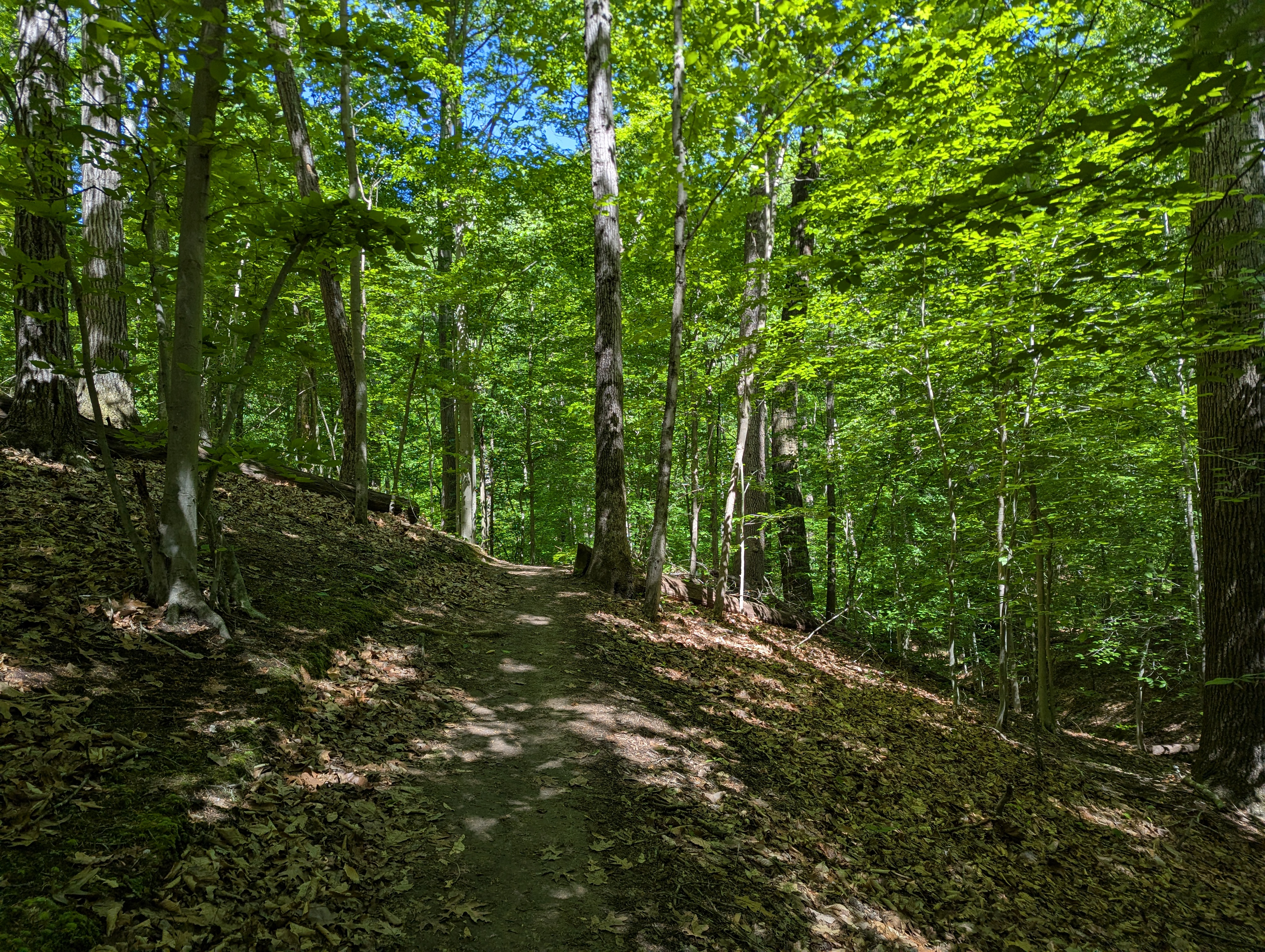
Hiking trail in the Bacon Ridge Natural Area

The Anne Arundel County Department of Recreation and Parks maintains the Generals Highway Corridor Park in Crownsville. Facilities include a nature trail and playing fields.

The Eisenhower Golf Course was Anne Arundel County's first public golf course, built in 1969. The 6,659-yard, 18-hole course was designed by golf architect Ed Ault on more than 220 acres (0.89 km^{2}; 0.34 sq mi).

The Bacon Ridge Natural Area is 630 acres of protected land, including forests and marshes, which is open to the public for hiking and nature observation. There is currently a 2.5 mile figure-eight trail accessible from the parking area off Hawkins Rd. In Fall 2016, a second phase of trails was created, adding 4.5+ miles to the trail. A fourth phase of trails was added in May 2022, with parking available at a lot off Severn Chapel Road.

== Points of interest ==
Every Autumn since 1985, Crownsville hosts the popular Maryland Renaissance Festival.

The grounds and buildings of the former Crownsville Hospital Center are still in Crownsville. Tenants include the Anne Arundel County Food Bank, which provides no-cost food assistance programs, a soup kitchen, distribution of medical equipment, and other aid programs through referrals from the county Department of Social Services and other service-oriented agencies.

The Anne Arundel County Fairgrounds are located in Crownsville on Generals Highway. The fairgrounds host a variety of events starting in Spring and continuing into Fall every year.
