= Maryland Renaissance Festival =

Renaissance fair in Crownsville, Maryland

Coordinates: 39°00′06″N 76°35′01″W

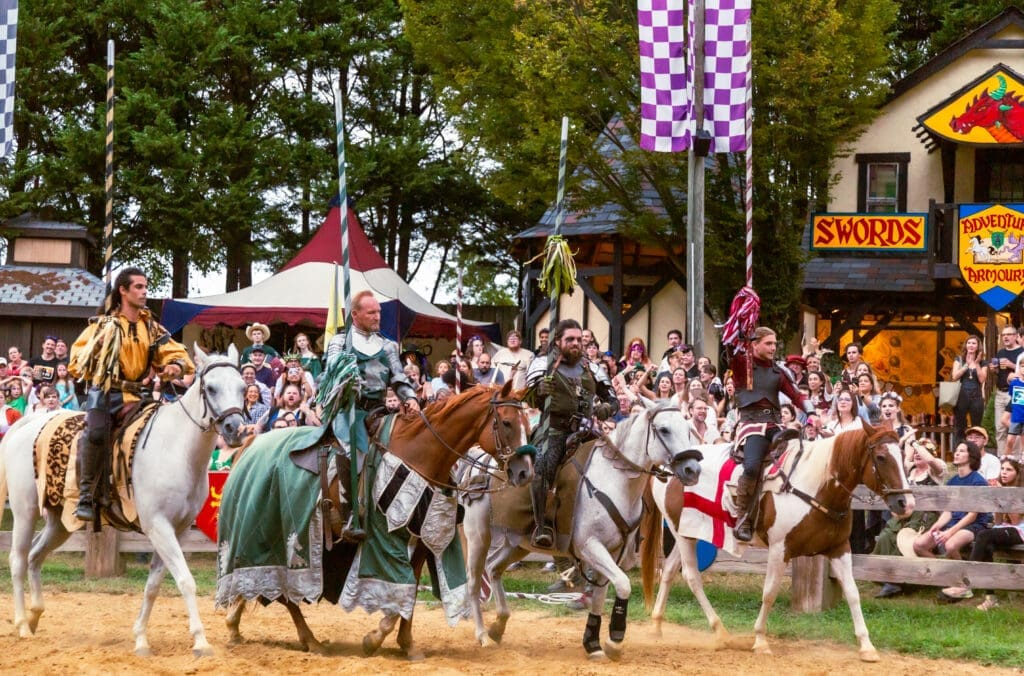
- Jousting Contestants at the Maryland Renaissance Festival, 2025
- Genre: Renaissance fair
- Dates: August – October
- Locations: Crownsville, Maryland
- Inaugurated: 1977
- Attendance: 15,800 daily, 300,000 season (average)
- Area: 25 acres (100,000 m^{2})
- Stages: 10
- Website: www.rennfest.com

The Maryland Renaissance Festival is a Renaissance fair located in Crownsville, Maryland. Set in a fictional 16th-century English village named Revel Grove, the festival is spread over 27 acres (110,000 m^{2}). It is open from the last weekend of August and runs for nine weekends.

== History ==
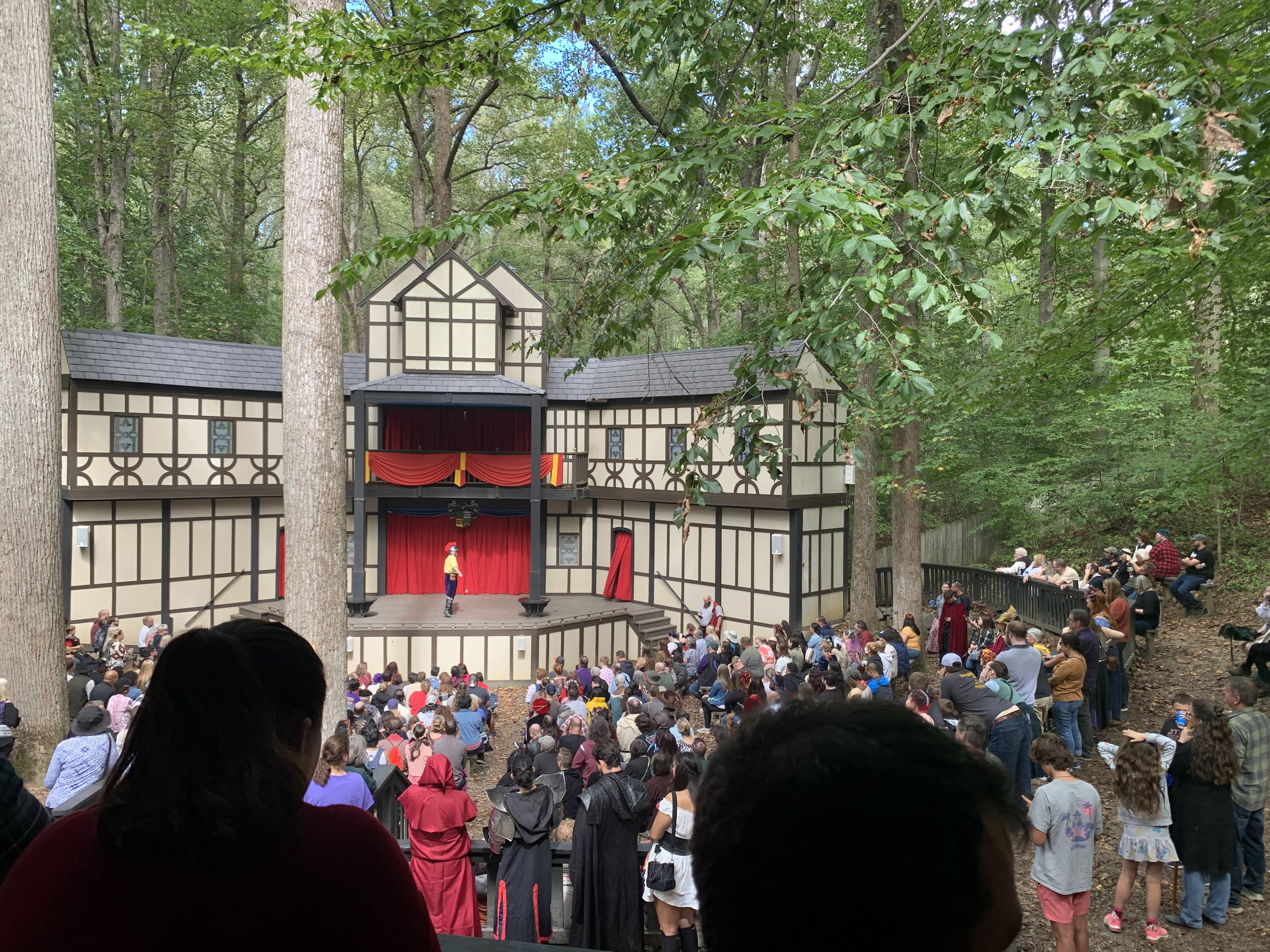
View of the Globe Theater from the inside of Bee Folk at Revel Grove

In the early 1970s, Minnesota lawyer Jules Smith Sr. (1930–2018) invested in George Coulam's Minnesota Renaissance Festival. A few years later, Coulam left the Minnesota festival and started the Texas Renaissance Festival, and Smith sold his shares in the Minnesota festival and organized a similar festival in Maryland, near Merriweather Post Pavilion in Columbia. The fair was first held for four weekends in 1977 and drew 17,000 people to see performances by Penn and Teller and The Flying Karamazov Brothers among others. In 1985, the fair was moved to its current location in Crownsville and in 1986 Smith turned over the management of the fair to his son Jules Smith Jr., who still runs the festival with three siblings. The festival was originally an Elizabethan fair, but in 1989 switched to being focused on Henry VIII of England. King Henry is played by actor Fred Nelson, replacing Bill Huttel, after Huttel's death in 2001.

On July 22, 2020, the Maryland Renaissance Festival announced that it would not operate in 2020 due to the COVID-19 pandemic.

== Fair ==
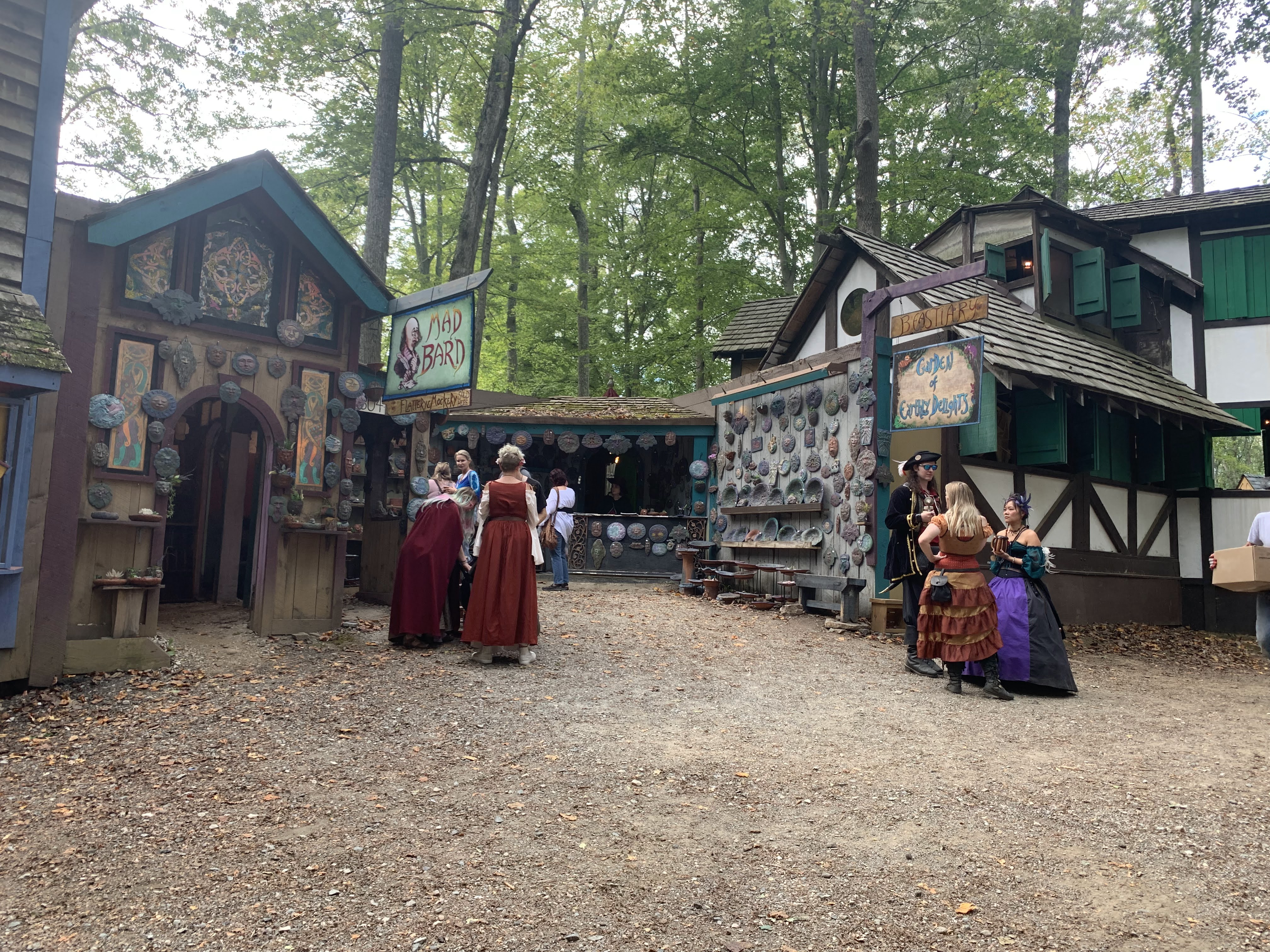
Garden of Earthly Delights and The Mad Bard located on Stub Toe Lane at Revel Grove

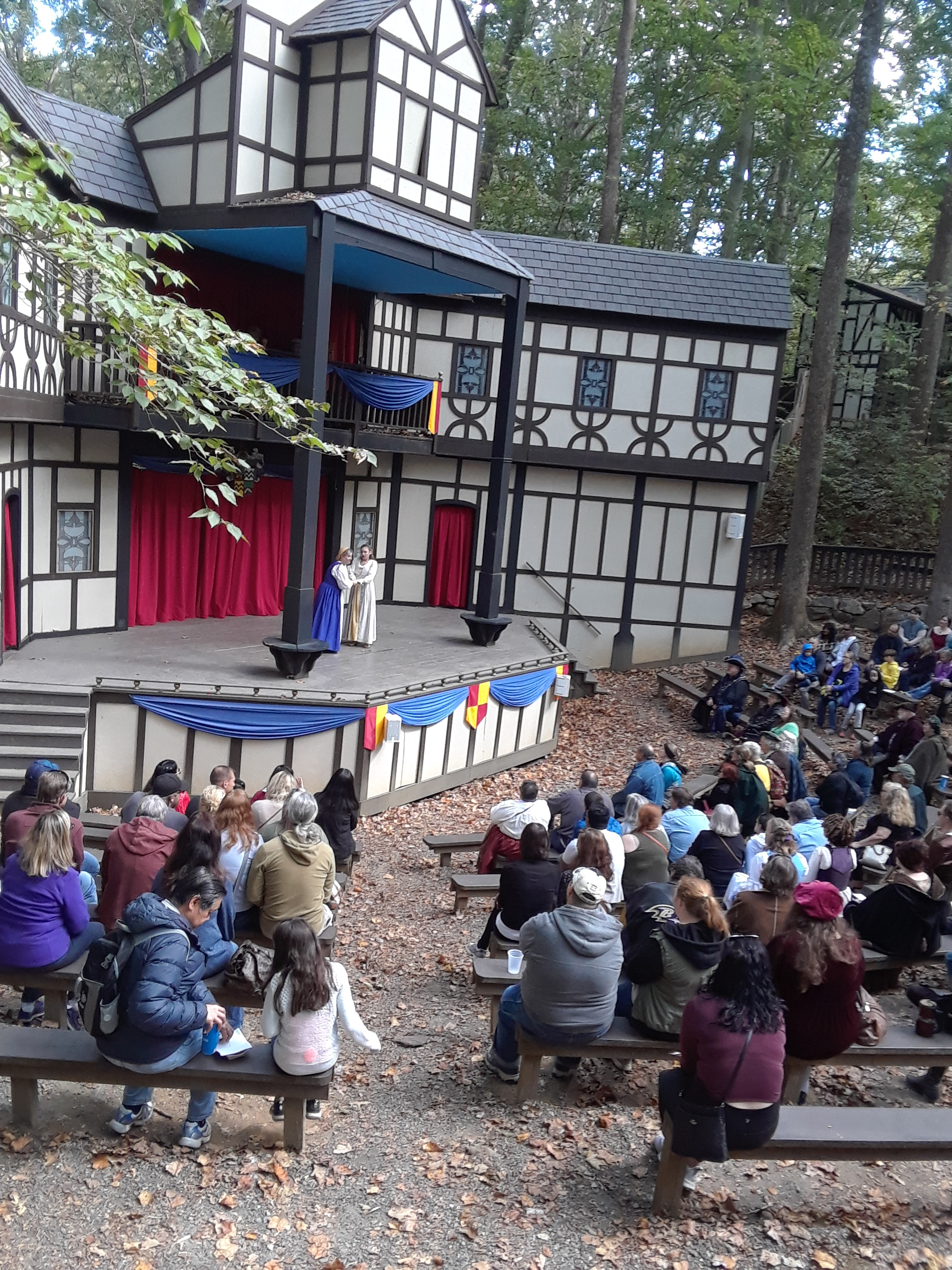
Crowds watch a Shakespeare play at the 2019 festival

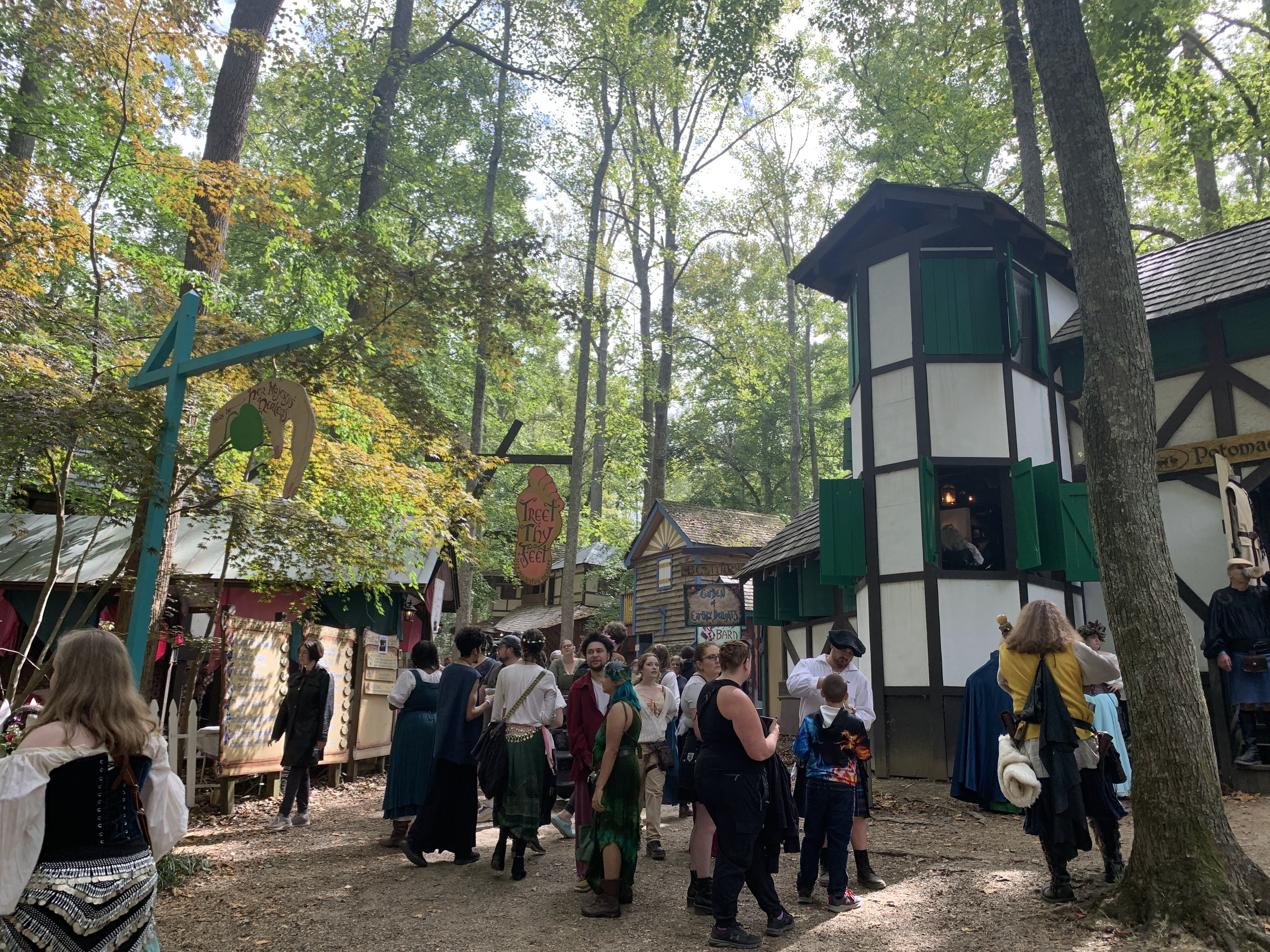
Potomac Leather and Her Majesty's Healers located on Stub Toe Lane at Revel Grove

The English Tudor village is 27 acres (110,000 m^{2}) of woods and fields. There are more than 130 craft shops and 42 food outlets.

More than 1,300 participants populate the village, 400 work directly for the company, 700 for the other vendors and 200 as performers on stages or as characters throughout the village. The Maryland Renaissance Festival utilizes eight major theaters, four smaller stages in taverns, a children's area, and a jousting tiltyard with seating for 3,000.

== See also ==
- List of Renaissance fairs
