= Fast and Loose (con game) =

Cheating game played at fairs

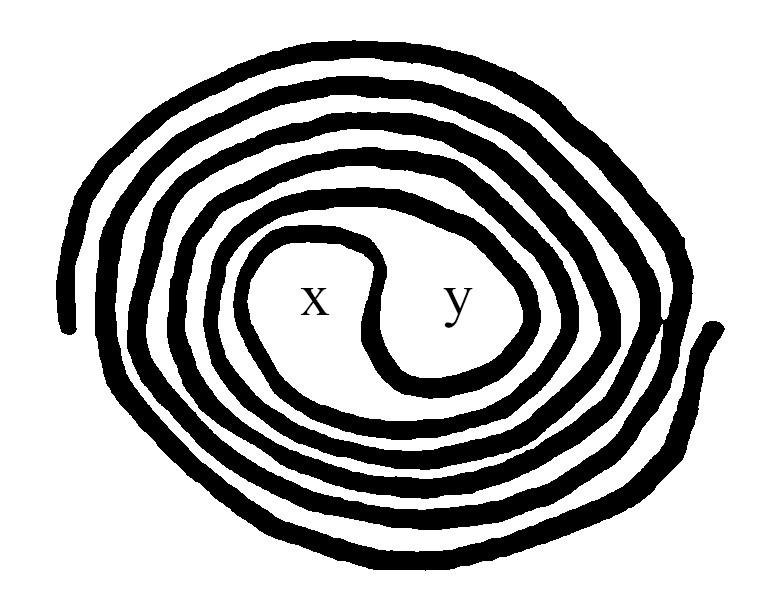
In "Pricking the Garter", a loop of string or a belt is placed onto a table, and the mark is asked to hold their finger or a stick at either x or y, gambling on whether the loop will catch them when pulled away.

Fast and Loose is a cheating game originally played at fairs by sharpers. It is also known as Pricking the Garter (Renaissance), The Strap (1930 con man argot), The Old Army Game (World War II), The Australian Belt, and Pricking at the Belt. A similar trick is known as On the Barrelhead.

The basic game is played with a circle of some sort of material, typically belts or garters in the past, or loops of string or jewellery chains in modern times. It is placed on a table in such a way that it forms two open loops. The player, or mark, places an object such as their finger or stick in one of the loops.

If they choose the right one, when the sharper attempts to lift the chain it will wrap around the object and become "fast" and the player wins. If they choose the wrong one, it is not actually around the object and is "loose". The confidence game involves the fact that which loop is fast changes depending on the way it is lifted, so the sharper can always make it loose.

The term "playing fast and loose" now means to be deceitful, unreliable, immoral, or reckless. This use of the term has been traced back to William Shakespeare's King John, implying the trick was already well established in the 16th century.

== History ==
In older periods, the leather or cloth webbing garters that men used to hold their stockings up around their thighs were used in this game; later, the cloth webbing belts like those used by soldiers were popular. Whatever the form, the game is played the same way. A strap, usually in the form of a belt, is folded in half by the street hustler or mountebank, and then wound into a coil, forming two identical loops in the center of the coil—one the folded center of the strap, and the other its first fold. These loops look identical.

The scam artist challenges a "mark" (spectator) to place a stick in the true center loop—the one that holds Fast to the stick when the two ends of the strap are pulled. If the operator pulled and the strap came "loose," the spectator lost his bet. Since the operator could secretly change how the two ends are pulled away, he could always win. Shills would help encourage others to play, make it look possible to win, and give spurious advice to the marks who tried to win. By winning, the shills encourage others to try—"It's easy, if you know how to spot it." At one time a popular scam, it was much practised by Gypsies, a circumstance alluded to by Shakespeare in Antony and Cleopatra (iv. 12):

O this false soul of Egypt! this grave charm, ...
Like a right gipsy, hath, at fast and loose,
Beguiled me to the very heart of loss.

Shakespeare also mentions Fast and Loose in "Love's Labour's Lost". This phrase is often attributed to Shakespeare, but, according to the OED, first appears as the title of an epigram in a popular miscellany from 1557. An act of the Parliament of Scotland from March 1575 set fines of up to five pounds Scots for those "using subtile, crafty and unlauchfull playis, as juglerie [i.e. magic] fast and lowise, and sic utheris". The colloquial expression to "play fast and loose"—to act unreliably or recklessly—has come into our common usage from Shakespeare. Sometime in the 18th or 19th century, the scam was resurrected with a new method—one which used a continuous loop of string.

The scam artists who worked the docks would often play this con on a barrel top for the sailors. This new version of the game was called "On the Barrelhead," from the phrase, "Put your money on the barrelhead." It was also known as "The Figure Eight" and later as "The Endless Chain."

== Operation ==
=== Pricking the Garter ===
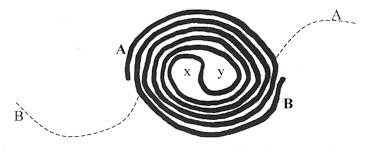
In Pricking the Garter, pulling strap A first will cause the loop to hold fast around x; pulling strap B first will hold fast around y

In Pricking the Garter, the outcome depends upon which end of the belt the sharper pulls first, and they make that decision on the basis of where the mark has placed their finger. Pulling one end will cause the two ends to unwind together around the mark's finger, and pull away freely. Pulling the other end first will cause both ends to move together, trapping the mark's finger.

=== On the Barrelhead ===
In On the Barrelhead, the mark places their finger in a twisted loop at either x or y, and the sharper pulls the loop away from the bottom

In the On the Barrelhead version, two or more loops are formed within the circle of a string. The spectator bets on which loop will hold Fast. In this version, it does not matter in what manner the string is picked up. Instead, the important thing is the method used to lay it out. Laid out in one pattern, one of the loops holds "fast." Laid out in what looked like an identical pattern, none of the loops would hold "fast": the victims cannot win. Since both the belt-style games and the endless-string-and-loop games are so similar, Fast and Loose is often used as a general term for this kind of game.

The loop is laid out in a twist so that it forms a circle with an X in it, similar to a cat's cradle or infinity symbol. The mark picks one side of the X or the other as the side to which the loop will hold fast when pulled from the other side. Unfortunately for the mark, the loop can be laid out in multiple ways. Here are a few methods that demonstrate the con:

The basic loop
Take a loop of string and lay it on the table. Take the right-hand side of the loop and bring it down and around clockwise until it overlaps the other end of the loop. Do not twist the loop at all. The right-hand side of the X is the gap around which you formed the circle X and is thus the loose side. The overlapped part is trapped and is the hold side.
The cheat loop
Take a loop of string and lay it on the table. Take the right-hand side of the loop and twist it 180 degrees counterclockwise. Then bring it down and around (clockwise) as before. Again the gap on the right hand side is loose, but now the overlapped portion on the left-hand side is also loose. Additionally, by picking up the bottom string and pulling it through the top string on either side will cause the loop to wrap around the opposite side and hold fast. Thus both sides will hold fast or come loose at the con artist’s discretion.
