= National Register of Historic Places listings in Martinsville, Virginia =

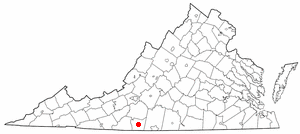
Location of Martinsville in Virginia

This is a list of the National Register of Historic Places listings in Martinsville, Virginia.

This is intended to be a complete list of the properties and districts on the National Register of Historic Places in the independent city of Martinsville, Virginia, United States. The locations of National Register properties and districts for which the latitude and longitude coordinates are included below, may be seen in an online map.

There are 8 properties and districts listed on the National Register in the city.

This National Park Service list is complete through NPS recent listings posted June 20, 2025.

== Current listings ==
	Name on the Register	Image	Date listed	Location	Description
1	John Waddey Carter House	John Waddey Carter House	November 3, 1988 (#88002180)	324 E. Church St. 36°41′18″N 79°51′55″W	Designed by architect George Franklin Barber
2	Dry Bridge School	Dry Bridge School	February 25, 2009 (#09000065)	1005 Jordan St. 36°41′31″N 79°50′55″W	
3	East Church Street-Starling Avenue Historic District	East Church Street-Starling Avenue Historic District	September 6, 2006 (#06000805)	Brown St., E. Church St., Cleveland Ave., Letcher Court, E. Market St., Scuffle Hill, and Starling Ave. 36°41′18″N 79°51′51″W	
4	Fayette Street Historic District	Fayette Street Historic District	May 2, 2007 (#07000395)	Fayette St. and side streets roughly bounded by Market, W. Church, Memorial and Swanson Sts. 36°41′33″N 79°52′54″W	
5	Little Post Office	Little Post Office	February 21, 1997 (#97000150)	207 Starling Ave. 36°41′05″N 79°51′56″W	
6	Martinsville Historic District	Martinsville Historic District	October 30, 1998 (#98001317)	Roughly bounded by State Route 457, the former Danville Railroad tracks, Clay St., and Market St.; also Fayette, Church, Market, Moss, Bridge, Broad, and Ellsworth Sts., Cleveland Ave. 36°41′30″N 79°52′21″W	Boundary changes were approved on December 27, 2022.
7	Martinsville Novelty Corporation Factory	Martinsville Novelty Corporation Factory	May 21, 2010 (#10000282)	900 Rives Rd. 36°40′36″N 79°51′41″W	
8	Scuffle Hill	Scuffle Hill	February 21, 1997 (#97000158)	311 E. Church St. 36°41′22″N 79°51′57″W	

== See also ==
- List of National Historic Landmarks in Virginia
- National Register of Historic Places listings in Virginia
