= William Hadden =

William Hadden may refer to:

- William J. Hadden (1921–1995), Protestant minister and chaplain
- William L. Hadden (1896–1983), American politician, lieutenant governor of Connecticut
