= Jessamine Shumate =

Virginia Artist

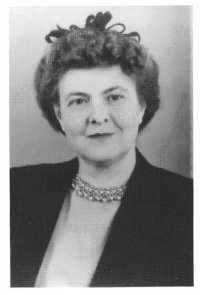
- Born: March 31, 1902; Horsepasture, Virginia
- Died: December 16, 1990 (aged 88); Greenville, North Carolina
- Other names: Ada Jessamine White
- Occupations: Artist, cartographer, historian
- Spouse: Whitney Shumate (December 13, 1922)
- Children: 2
- Relatives: Whit Haydn (grandson - magician and entertainer)
- Awards: Virginia Museum of Fine Arts - "Award of Distinction" (1955)

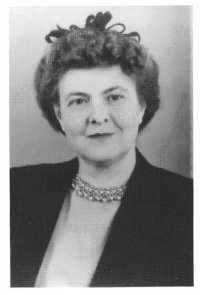
Jessamine Shumate

Ada Jessamine Shumate (born March 31, 1902, as Ada Jessamine White in Horsepasture, Virginia – died on December 16, 1990, in Greenville, North Carolina) was an American artist, historian and cartographer, winner of the "Award of Distinction" in 1955 from the Virginia Museum of Fine Arts.

== Work ==
Jessamine Shumate worked within a number of different styles and media during her career. "Her work covers a broad range of media including silk screen-printing, pastel, transparent and opaque water color, oil, collage, batik and serigraph. Some of her techniques involve oil and the use of a blowtorch. She uses her serigraphs and silk screens as part of her collage work. Mrs. Shumate also makes photographic prints of her original work." She did traditional portraits; still life; traditional bucolic and rural scenes of Virginia and landscapes. She also completed a number of abstract art works, using cubism, orientalism and found object art. However, during her time, she lived in artistic isolation. In southwestern Virginia, there were few other professional artists, and fewer people to discuss and exchange artistic ideas with. Those artists in the southwestern Virginia area during the 1940s and 1950s, were frequently very conservative in their tastes. They often concentrated only on traditional southern art paintings, such as family portraits, landscapes, or simply decorating utensils. Few other people in the region had the scope and range of Jessamine Shumate's efforts, and she received much local criticism and disapproval for some of her modern art projects and accomplishments. She was also a founder of what is now called the Piedmont Arts Association in Martinsville, Virginia.

A still controversial series of art works was done showing the Broad Street Christian Church in Martinsville, Virginia of which she was a member. Margaret Hadden said: "Her church, Broad Street Christian Church, in Martinsville, was very important to her and she taught the kindergarten class in Sunday school for many years." In this series of experiments, she did one oil painting of the outside of the church in the cubist style (See: Cubism), showing an abstract view of the church from different sides simultaneously. In another two pastels, she shows the light of the stained glass windows filling the inside of the sanctuary and coming forth out from the church, and illuminating the area around the church, passing through the brick walls.

Another two works were done in watercolor painting of the Philpott Dam in Henry County. These were done during the construction phase of the dam, and both paintings show the temporary cement factory that was constructed to make the cement locally, and then taken down and removed after the dam was constructed. Her paintings are the only representations from this period, since most other photographic work concentrated on the construction of the dam itself, and not in the engineering aspects of the construction site. These paintings have recently been given to the Philpott Dam. "Relatives of the late artist Ada Jessamine Shumate, who contributed two of her paintings of the construction of Philpott Dam to the dam's visitor center. Shumate was a native of Henry County who painted the construction during the 1950s. Sharing the paintings with the public is a fitting tribute to her work and a good way for people to get a sense of what went into creating the dam." Another article commented: "Relatives of the late artist Ada Jessamine Shumate, who contributed two of her paintings of the construction of Philpott Dam to the dam's visitor center. Shumate was a native of Henry County who painted the construction during the 1950s. Sharing the paintings with the public is a fitting tribute to her work and a good way for people to get a sense of what went into creating the dam."

Another series of paintings were done when she was a student at the Woman's College in Greensboro, North Carolina, now the University of North Carolina at Greensboro. Some of these paintings show a cubist style of the gym and other buildings, showing images of the past and present brought together, so older buildings appear to overlap newer construction. Other paintings are pastels showing scenes of student housing and life in Greensboro, North Carolina, from the late 1940s.

Jessamine Shumate was also famous for some of her unusual works. One of the most interesting was a burned cookie sheet. "Mrs. Jessamine Shumate... is perhaps the only local artist to use a burned cookie sheet and a blow torch to do some of her painting." And another writer from Roanoke said: "When it come to experimental material it is quite possible that Jessamine Shumate takes some kind of cake for painting on a cookie sheet. For me this is actually one of the most delightful items in the show. No one would guess that her bright, "Pebbly Abstract No. 3" is the result of a near kitchen disaster. Jim Yeatts, gallery owner, tells us that the artist left the cookie tin in the oven too long one day and tried desperately to get it clean. When it didn't begin to shine properly, she decided to paint it and frame it. "Cookie Sheet", done in "mixed media", is a delightful addition to the show. It may also be some sort of inspiration to other kitchen artists, who prefer paint brushes to scouring pads." The art piece is an example of "found object art", in that it is presented by the artist as a work of art, but the object was originally designed for a non-art function. Jessamine Shumate had taken something that was "found" and made it into another, more artistic, representation.

Jessamine Shumate has shown her works in the art museums of Virginia Museum of Fine Arts in Richmond, Virginia; the Taubman Museum of Art in Roanoke, Virginia; Bristol, Tennessee, the Greenville Museum of Art in Greenville, North Carolina, Tarboro, North Carolina, the art museum of Springfield, Massachusetts, and others.

== Life ==
Jessamine Shumate was born to a tradesman and general store owner in Horsepasture, Virginia, Nathan Mortimer White and Ada Bassett White, who was an elementary school truant officer. Her father was quite the country scientist and shade tree inventor, and she said of him in her autobiography, "Another memory is going with my father to the barn each night to feed the animals there. In 1910, when Halley's Comet was seen, we watched for it and he told me all about it as we walked to the barn. He was very interested in scientific happenings and nature, and I was fascinated by the sight! What a thrill to know I had lived long enough to see Halley's Comet again in 1986. This time, however, the sight was not as wonderful! Even the scientists were disappointed in the display of Halley's Comet's tail. The next time around, I suppose my great grandchildren will be here to see the comet."

As a younger woman, she had never painted seriously, but said she had always wanted to. She had taught art at of the higher grade classes in my school. While her youngest daughter was enrolled in Lynchburg College, she decided to drive to Lynchburg every week and take some art courses there. She enjoyed the classes, and later she went to Women's College in Greensboro, North Carolina, now known as the University of North Carolina at Greensboro, to take more advanced art classes. She also attended some courses at the Art Students League of New York. Every month during the school session, she would ride the train to New York City and stay for a week. She learned a great deal from these classes, and enjoyed her painting and experimenting with many different kinds of medium.

She married Whitney Shumate on December 13, 1922. She said in her autobiography, "While I was going to school in Martinsville, I met a young man named Whitney Shumate. We started dating and went together for three years before we were married. The family teased me, because Whitney had a large car and when he came to Preston, Virginia to visit, always took me and a few members of my family for rides. When he bought a coupe, everyone said he was getting serious and wanted to leave my family at home when he took me for rides! It must have been true, because we were married on December 13, 1922."

Whitney and Jessamine Shumate had two daughters, Ada Margaret S. Hadden (Mrs. William J. Hadden) and Jessamine "Jeppy" White S. Calhoun. Her grandson, Whit Haydn, is a magician and entertainer.

== Awards ==
- 1955- Award of Distinction, for her painting, "Joy", from the Virginia Museum of Fine Arts, Richmond. The Virginia Museum of Fine Arts bought one of her serigraphs for their permanent collection and several times she had paintings in their Traveling Exhibit.
- 1956- 1st Prize, Virginia Highlands Festival, for her painting, Soul Fluctuations. The Virginia Highlands Festival, in Abingdon, Virginia, began in 1948 and, over the years, has grown and flourished. Today it is one of the top 100 tourist events in North America and one of the top 20 in the Southeast- offering plenty of entertainment, an enormous antiques market, juried art and photography competitions, and a juried arts and crafts show, as well as nationally known writers, lecturers, and visual and performing artists.
- Received a Merit Award from the Association of University Women in Roanoke, Va., in 1956.
- She won a sterling silver bowl from the Piedmont Chapter of the Virginia Museum of Fine Arts at the Martinsville, Virginia, "Piedmont Art Show" on May 12, 1962. The silver bowl is inscribed with "First Prize- Oil".

== Major works ==
- Historical Map of Virginia, copyright 1959. Silk screen (see: Screen-printing). Completed in 1959, this large map shows local history, important families and their coats of arms, and other features from Virginia's four hundred years of Colonial and American history. This map took over 27 silk screens to print, and each one was hand corrected. Each copy says: "The Artist weeps and heaps piles of ashes on her head if your coat of arms is not on this map. Put it in the blank shield in the top left corner."
- Historical Map of Henry County, Virginia and a separate broadside chronology of local history. Copyright 1957. "The cover of 'Our Proud Heritage' is reproduced from a silk screen print made by Mrs. Jessamine Shumate, of Martinsville." The map and chronology are both available at the University of Virginia, Special Collections Library, in Charlottesville, VA.
- Historical Map of Guilford County, North Carolina Using a silk screened process, this 1959 map showed the position and shape of the county, as well as local events, such as the Battle of Guilford Courthouse, and other local history. Copyright 1959. A copy of this map is available at the University of Virginia, Special Collections Library, in Charlottesville, VA.
- Historical Map of Pitt County, North Carolina, copyright 1968. This is also available as a serigraph, along with a printed chronology of the county. The map and a separate broadside chronology are available at the Sheppard Memorial Library, Local History Collection, in Greenville, North Carolina. Copies are also available for viewing at the University of Virginia, Special Collections Department of the Alderman Library, in Charlottesville, Virginia and at East Carolina University in the East Carolina Manuscript Collection at J.Y. Joyner Library in Greenville, North Carolina.
- Composition, copyright 1965. This was one of her favorites, and is an abstract composition of shapes in gray, yellow and red. She made a number of prints of this painting.
- Wind in New York This is a study in black and white, and shows the impressive winds that could blow between the skyscrapers of New York. When Jessamine Shumate was attending art school in New York City, a gust of wind was so powerful that it picked her up and blew her against a taxicab. This event is also shown in this study.
- Soul Fluctuations Awarded 1st Prize, Virginia Highlands Festival, 1956

== Legacy ==
A collection of Jessamine Shumate's histories and chronologies of select Virginia and North Carolina counties including screenprints, prints on wood, and painted prints, are held in the Jessamine Shumate Collection in the East Carolina Manuscript Collection at J.Y. Joyner Library at East Carolina University in Greenville, North Carolina.

== Bibliography ==
- Bassett, Mary Henrian. 1976. The Bassett Family in Henry County, Virginia, with Stories, Mainly of the Woodson Bassett Branch. Martinsville, Va.: Bassett. LCCN: 77–355841. http://www.worldcat.org/oclc/2856828
- Black, Helen. 1967. "Rich Acres History Students Want County to Adopt Mrs. Shumate's Flag." Martinsville Bulletin. Sunday, February 26, 1967, page 1-B. Two photos by Remsen.
- Black, Helen. 1952. "Mrs. Shumate Interested in Work of Fellow Artists." Martinsville Bulletin. Exact date not given. Page number not given. Photo by "Remsen".
- Hadden, Margaret S. 2007. My Memoirs. Lulu Publishing Co. ISBN 978-1-4357-0143-4. http://www.worldcat.org/oclc/301750085
- Hadden, Robert Lee. 1990. The Shamrock and the Fleur de Lys: the Family Histories of the William James Hadden family and the Whitney Shumate Family. Greenville, NC: Hadden Pub. Association. LCCN: 90–085879. http://www.worldcat.org/oclc/23051809
- “Jessamine Shumate.” 2008?
- Jessamine Shumate papers [manuscript] c. 1890 – c. 1990. University of Virginia, Albert and Shirely Small Special Collections Library. 4 cubic boxes. The collection consists chiefly of correspondence of the Bassett, White, and Shumate families of Virginia and also includes photographs, news clippings, scrapbooks, and reference files on various art topics. Call number: MSS 15205.
- Shumate, Jessamine. Chronology of Pitt County History. [Virginia]: [publisher not identified], 1953. Signed, in print, at end: "Compiled by Jessamine Shumate." Chronology extends from 1690 through 1953. Printed in 3 columns within an ornamental border, with 9 vignettes and a small map interspersed. http://www.worldcat.org/oclc/725820652
- Shumate, Jessamine. Chronology of Henry County History. [Virginia]: [publisher not identified], 1960. Signed, in print, at end: "Compiled by Jessamine Shumate." Chronology extends from 1634 through 1960. http://www.worldcat.org/oclc/725823564
- Shumate, Jessamine. Historical Map of Pitt County, North Carolina. 1961.
- Smith, Rodney. 1967. "Cookie Sheet and Blow Torch are Used in Art Work by Mrs. Jessamine Shumate." Henry County Journal. December 20, 1967. Page 3.
- Winston, Eliza. 2010. "Philpott Dam construction paintings given to center." Martinsville Bulletin. September 21, 2010. Page 1.
