= Martinsville, Virginia =

Independent city in Virginia, United States

- Independent city
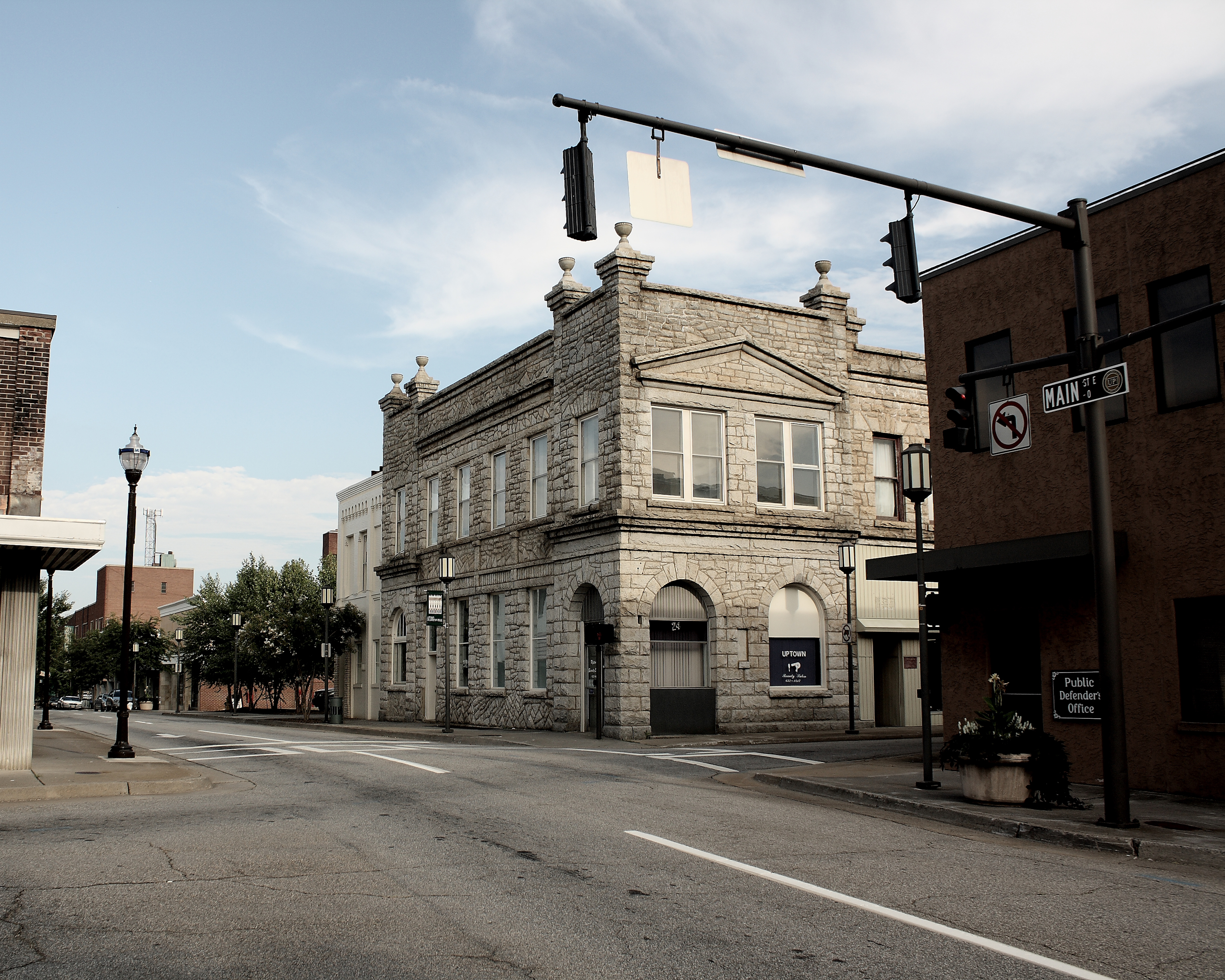
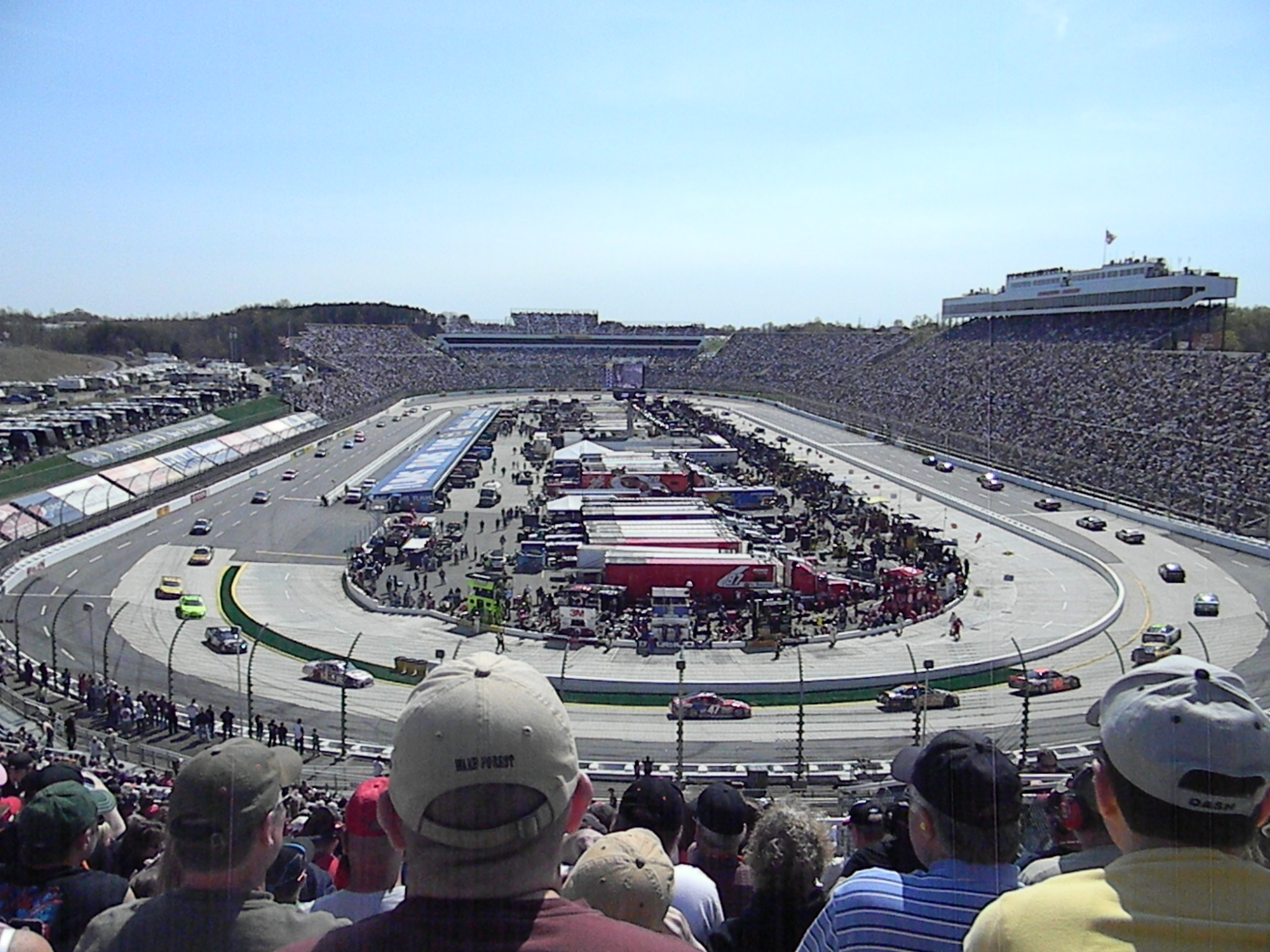
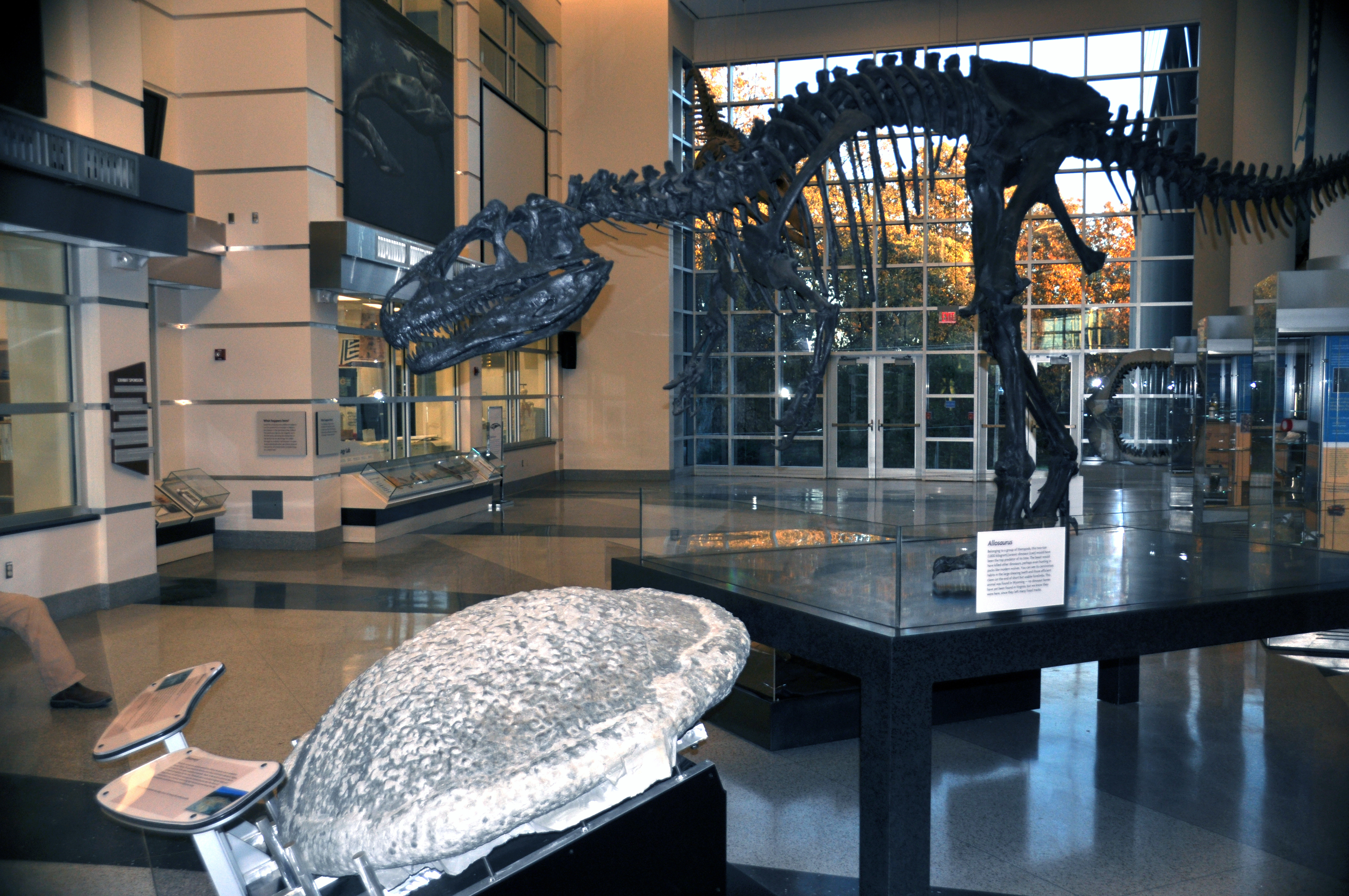
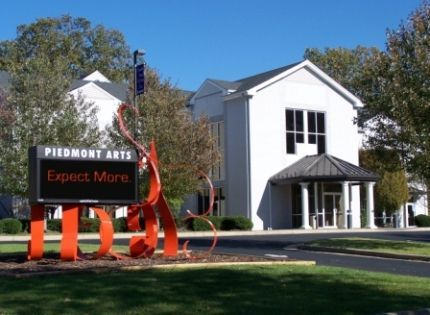
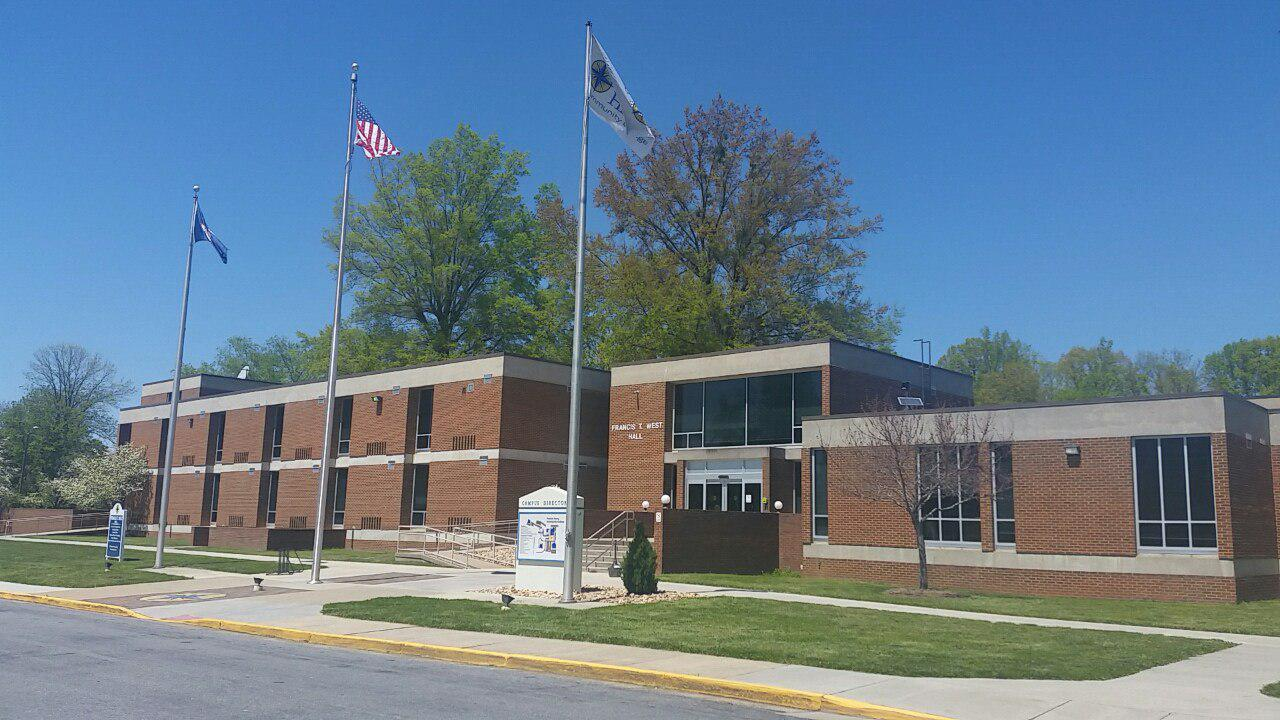
- Martinsville's Uptown Martinsville Martinsville Speedway Virginia Museum of Natural History Piedmont Arts Association Patrick & Henry Community College Clockwise from top: Uptown Martinsville, Martinsville Speedway, Virginia Museum of Natural History, Piedmont Arts Association, Patrick & Henry Community College

- Seal
- Nicknames: M-Ville, The 276, Titletown
- Motto: A City Without Limits
- Coordinates: 36°41′10″N 79°52′9″W
- Country: United States
- State: Virginia
- County: Henry
- Founded: 1791
- Incorporated (town): 1873
- Incorporated (city): 1929
- Named for: Joseph Martin

Government
  - Type: Council-manager
  - Mayor: L.C. Jones (I)
  - Vice Mayor: Kathy Lawson
  - Council: Martinsville City Council

Area
  - Total: 11.01 sq mi (28.51 km^{2})
  - Land: 10.95 sq mi (28.37 km^{2})
  - Water: 0.054 sq mi (0.14 km^{2})
- Elevation: 1,020 ft (310 m)

Population (2020)
  - Total: 13,485
  - Estimate (2025): 13,849 ▲
  - Density: 1,231/sq mi (475.3/km^{2})
- Time zone: UTC−5 (Eastern (EST))
  - Summer (DST): UTC−4 (EDT)
- ZIP codes: 24112-24115
- Area code: 276
- FIPS code: 51-49784
- GNIS feature ID: 1498514
- Website: http://www.martinsville-va.gov

Martinsville is an independent city in the Commonwealth of Virginia in the United States. As of the 2020 census, its population was 13,485. A community of both Southside and Southwest Virginia, it is the county seat of Henry County, although the two are separate jurisdictions. The Bureau of Economic Analysis combines the city of Martinsville with Henry County for statistical purposes.

Martinsville is the principal city of the Martinsville micropolitan statistical area, which includes the communities and towns of Axton, Bassett, Chatmoss, Collinsville, Fieldale, Horsepasture, Laurel Park, Oak Level, Sandy Level, Stanleytown, Villa Heights, Spencer, and Ridgeway. The Martinsville Micropolitan Area has a population of 63,765 as of the 2020 census.

The round-end oval Martinsville Speedway, the shortest track in the NASCAR Cup Series at 0.526 miles (847 m) and one of the first paved "speedways", is located just outside the city near the town of Ridgeway.

== History ==
Martinsville was founded by American Revolutionary War general, Native American agent and explorer Joseph Martin, born in Albemarle County. He developed his plantation Scuffle Hill on the banks of the Smith River near the present-day southern city limits. General Martin and revolutionary patriot Patrick Henry, who lived briefly in Henry County and for whom the county is named, were good friends.

The Beaver Creek Plantation,John Waddey Carter House, Dry Bridge School, East Church Street-Starling Avenue Historic District, Fayette Street Historic District, Little Post Office, Martinsville Fish Dam, Martinsville Historic District, Martinsville Novelty Corporation Factory, and Scuffle Hill are listed on the National Register of Historic Places.

=== 20th century ===
Many African American churches, schools, and businesses were established along Fayette Street in the early 20th century. Dr. Dana Olden Baldwin, the area's first Black physician, moved to Martinsville in 1910. Baldwin's entrepreneurial vision expanded the number of businesses along Fayette Street, creating "Baldwin's Block" as an epicenter of African-American commerce and social life during the racial segregation of Jim Crow laws.

DuPont in 1941 built a large manufacturing plant for producing textile nylon filament, a vital war material. During the Cold War, the city was identified as a target for strategic bombing by the Soviet Union. This nylon production jump-started the growth of the textiles industry in the area.

In 1947, the round-end oval Martinsville Speedway opened. In use by NASCAR since its inaugural season in 1949, the oval is still in operation by the racing organization today. The speedway is the shortest oval in NASCAR.

For several years, Martinsville was known as the "Sweatshirt Capital of the World", and in the 1980s, it boasted of having more millionaires per capita than any city in America.

Business leaders in the mid-20th century, such as Whitney Shumate, worked to improve substandard housing in Martinsville. He helped clear out a portion of Martinsville called "Mill Town", which had substandard rental housing originally provided for 19th-century employees of a now-defunct cotton mill. New homes were constructed in the neighborhood, built with sound materials and all city services for the first time. What had originally been considered a depressed civic area rapidly became a center of progress, as middle class Black residents finally began to prosper. As an editorial in the local newspaper noted, "One of the projects which won him considerable attention and praise was the instigation of the redevelopment of what was once known as Martinsville Cotton Mill Village. He and associates purchased about 50 houses in North Martinsville, and using private capital rather than federal aid, rebuilt them into comfortably inhabitable homes, making it possible for many persons to purchase homes within their financial range."

In the early 1990s, changing global economic conditions and new trade treaties made Martinsville textiles and furniture manufacturing economically unsustainable. Many firms closed shop and laid off thousands of workers; the production moved to other countries. The city is repositioning itself long-term as a center for technology development and manufacturing.

MZM, Inc. opened a facility in Martinsville as part of the Cunningham scandal.

Memorial Hospital of Martinsville (now combined with the hospital in Danville, Virginia, to become Sovah Health) serves the greater Martinsville and Henry County area. The earliest local hospital was the 50-bed Shackelford Hospital, founded by Jesse Martin Shackelford, who was later joined by surgeon son John Armstrong Shackelford, an early graduate of Johns Hopkins University School of Medicine. Founder of the Hospital Association of Virginia, Jesse Shackelford was an early advocate of comprehensive care for state citizens. Shackleford recruited Dr. Dana O. Baldwin to work with him as an anesthesiologist. Baldwin established his own medical practice to provide care for Martinsville's African-American population and opened the first Black hospital, St. Mary's, in 1926. Shackelford Hospital was sold in 1946, and Martinsville General Hospital subsequently opened with John Shackelford as its first chief surgeon. In 1970 Memorial Hospital of Martinsville opened its doors, replacing Martinsville General.

=== 21st century ===
On January 2, 2013, Kim Adkins was re-elected as mayor.

In August 2021, Virginia Governor Ralph Northam pardoned all seven African-American men of the Martinsville Seven.

On January 3, 2023, L.C. Jones was elected as new mayor.

=== Relationship with Henry County ===
Martinsville's relationship with Henry County is somewhat complex. Martinsville was fully included in Henry County's jurisdiction until it was declared a city by court order in 1928. As with all cities in Virginia, Martinsville's incorporation as a city made it independent from Henry County's jurisdiction. Although Martinsville technically remains the county seat of Henry County, nearby Collinsville serves as the de facto county seat, as it is where the county's primary administrative and judicial offices are located. However, the future of this jurisdictional arrangement became unclear when Martinsville's city council unanimously voted in favor of beginning the process of reverting from a city to a town (which would reincorporate it into the county's jurisdiction) on December 10, 2019, citing economic and demographic concerns. The time frame for this reversion remains unclear, as the city's petition to revert must first be approved by a three-judge panel in the state courts, after which begins a complex process of negotiation with the county over the division of responsibilities. On January 11, 2023, the city council voted to end the reversion process.

== Geography ==
According to the United States Census Bureau, the city has a total area of 11.0 square miles (28.5 km^{2}), of which 0.1 sq mi (0.3 km^{2}) (0.5%) is covered by water. The north side of the city has the highest average elevation. The east side slopes gradually down to the Smith River on the south side. The west side is hilly. Martinsville is located in the Southern Virginia region near the Virginia–North Carolina state line and is 17 miles (27 km) northwest of Eden, North Carolina, 30 miles (48 km) northwest of Danville, 48 miles (77 km) north of Greensboro, North Carolina. 51 miles (82 km) south of Roanoke, and 54 miles (87 km) northeast of Winston-Salem, North Carolina.

=== Climate ===
Climate data for Martinsville, Virginia (1991–2020 normals, extremes 1937–present)
| Month | Jan | Feb | Mar | Apr | May | Jun | Jul | Aug | Sep | Oct | Nov | Dec | Year |
|---|---|---|---|---|---|---|---|---|---|---|---|---|---|
| Record high °F (°C) | 79 (26) | 82 (28) | 89 (32) | 92 (33) | 101 (38) | 102 (39) | 104 (40) | 105 (41) | 101 (38) | 95 (35) | 86 (30) | 82 (28) | 105 (41) |
| Mean daily maximum °F (°C) | 48.4 (9.1) | 52.2 (11.2) | 60.3 (15.7) | 70.8 (21.6) | 77.7 (25.4) | 84.7 (29.3) | 88.0 (31.1) | 85.9 (29.9) | 79.8 (26.6) | 70.7 (21.5) | 60.3 (15.7) | 51.1 (10.6) | 69.2 (20.7) |
| Daily mean °F (°C) | 36.1 (2.3) | 38.9 (3.8) | 45.9 (7.7) | 55.6 (13.1) | 64.0 (17.8) | 72.0 (22.2) | 76.0 (24.4) | 74.2 (23.4) | 67.6 (19.8) | 56.7 (13.7) | 46.0 (7.8) | 38.7 (3.7) | 56.0 (13.3) |
| Mean daily minimum °F (°C) | 23.8 (−4.6) | 25.5 (−3.6) | 31.6 (−0.2) | 40.4 (4.7) | 50.3 (10.2) | 59.2 (15.1) | 64.0 (17.8) | 62.6 (17.0) | 55.5 (13.1) | 42.8 (6.0) | 31.7 (−0.2) | 26.3 (−3.2) | 42.8 (6.0) |
| Record low °F (°C) | −7 (−22) | −7 (−22) | −3 (−19) | 18 (−8) | 26 (−3) | 35 (2) | 43 (6) | 41 (5) | 30 (−1) | 14 (−10) | 5 (−15) | −2 (−19) | −7 (−22) |
| Average precipitation inches (mm) | 3.83 (97) | 3.04 (77) | 4.08 (104) | 3.60 (91) | 4.50 (114) | 4.41 (112) | 4.01 (102) | 4.17 (106) | 5.09 (129) | 3.57 (91) | 3.33 (85) | 3.72 (94) | 47.35 (1,203) |
| Average snowfall inches (cm) | 3.3 (8.4) | 2.4 (6.1) | 1.7 (4.3) | 0.0 (0.0) | 0.0 (0.0) | 0.0 (0.0) | 0.0 (0.0) | 0.0 (0.0) | 0.0 (0.0) | 0.0 (0.0) | 0.0 (0.0) | 2.0 (5.1) | 9.4 (24) |
| Average precipitation days (≥ 0.01 in) | 9.5 | 9.1 | 10.5 | 9.7 | 12.0 | 11.3 | 11.7 | 9.8 | 9.0 | 8.0 | 8.2 | 9.9 | 118.7 |
| Average snowy days (≥ 0.1 in) | 0.7 | 0.4 | 0.5 | 0.0 | 0.0 | 0.0 | 0.0 | 0.0 | 0.0 | 0.0 | 0.0 | 0.3 | 1.9 |
Source: NOAA

== Demographics ==
Historical population
| Census | Pop. | Note | %± |
|---|---|---|---|
| 1880 | 289 | | — |
| 1900 | 2,384 | | — |
| 1910 | 3,368 | | 41.3% |
| 1920 | 4,075 | | 21.0% |
| 1930 | 7,705 | | 89.1% |
| 1940 | 10,080 | | 30.8% |
| 1950 | 17,251 | | 71.1% |
| 1960 | 18,798 | | 9.0% |
| 1970 | 19,653 | | 4.5% |
| 1980 | 18,149 | | −7.7% |
| 1990 | 16,162 | | −10.9% |
| 2000 | 15,416 | | −4.6% |
| 2010 | 13,821 | | −10.3% |
| 2020 | 13,485 | | −2.4% |
| 2025 (est.) | 13,849 | ▲ | 2.7% |
U.S. Decennial Census; 1790–1960 1900–1990; 1990–2000 2010–2020

=== Racial and ethnic composition ===
Martinsville city, Virginia – Racial and ethnic composition Note: the US Census treats Hispanic/Latino as an ethnic category. This table excludes Latinos from the racial categories and assigns them to a separate category. Hispanics/Latinos may be of any race.
| Race / Ethnicity (NH = Non-Hispanic) | Pop 1980 | Pop 1990 | Pop 2000 | Pop 2010 | Pop 2020 | % 1980 | % 1990 | % 2000 | % 2010 | % 2020 |
|---|---|---|---|---|---|---|---|---|---|---|
| White alone (NH) | 12,299 | 10,119 | 8,336 | 6,707 | 5,732 | 67.77% | 62.61% | 54.07% | 48.53% | 42.51% |
| Black or African American alone (NH) | 5,684 | 5,929 | 6,501 | 6,191 | 6,043 | 31.32% | 36.68% | 42.17% | 44.79% | 44.81% |
| Native American or Alaska Native alone (NH) | 1 | 20 | 12 | 18 | 23 | 0.01% | 0.12% | 0.08% | 0.13% | 0.17% |
| Asian alone (NH) | 52 | 32 | 72 | 127 | 116 | 0.29% | 0.20% | 0.47% | 0.92% | 0.86% |
| Native Hawaiian or Pacific Islander alone (NH) | x | x | 0 | 0 | 4 | x | x | 0.00% | 0.00% | 0.03% |
| Other race alone (NH) | 0 | 3 | 21 | 10 | 46 | 0.00% | 0.02% | 0.14% | 0.07% | 0.34% |
| Multiracial (NH) | x | x | 116 | 216 | 496 | x | x | 0.75% | 1.56% | 3.68% |
| Hispanic or Latino (any race) | 113 | 59 | 358 | 552 | 1,025 | 0.62% | 0.37% | 2.32% | 3.99% | 7.60% |
| Total | 18,149 | 16,162 | 15,416 | 13,821 | 13,485 | 100.00% | 100.00% | 100.00% | 100.00% | 100.00% |

=== 2020 census ===
As of the 2020 census, Martinsville had a population of 13,485. The median age was 44.6 years. About 21.0% of residents were under 18 and 21.6% were 65 or older. For every 100 females, there were 85.7 males, and for every 100 females 18 and over, there were 81.4 males 18 and over.

Almost all of the residents lived in urban areas, while 0.1% lived in rural areas.

Of the 5,909 households in Martinsville, 25.8% had children under 18 living in them, 31.1% were married-couple households, 21.1% were households with a male householder and no spouse or partner present, and 41.7% were households with a female householder and no spouse or partner present. About 38.3% of all households were made up of individuals, and 16.8% had someone living alone who was 65 or older.

The city had 7,053 housing units, of which 16.2% were vacant. The homeowner vacancy rate was 3.7% and the rental vacancy rate was 13.3%.

Racial composition as of the 2020 census
| Race | Number | Percent |
|---|---|---|
| White | 5,924 | 43.9% |
| Black or African American | 6,094 | 45.2% |
| American Indian and Alaska Native | 50 | 0.4% |
| Asian | 116 | 0.9% |
| Native Hawaiian and Other Pacific Islander | 4 | 0.0% |
| Some other race | 535 | 4.0% |
| Two or more races | 762 | 5.7% |
| Hispanic or Latino (of any race) | 1,025 | 7.6% |

=== 2010 census ===
As of the census of 2010, 13,821 people, 6,498 households, and 4,022 families resided in the city. The population density was 1,407.1 people per square mile (543.3 people/km^{2}). The 7,249 housing units had an average density of 661.7 per square mile (255.5/km^{2}). The racial makeup of the city was 48.38% White, 45.45% African American, 0.10% Native American, 0.47% Asian, 0.69% from [other races, and 0.81% from two or more races. Hispanics or Latinos of any race were 5.70% of the population.

Of the 6,498 households, 26.3% had children under 18 living with them, 39.0% were married couples living together, 19.1% had a female householder with no husband present, and 38.1% were not families. About 34.2% of all households were made up of individuals, and 15.4% had someone living alone who was 65 or older. The average household size was 2.27 and the average family size was 2.89.

The age distribution was 22.6% under 18, 7.0% from 18 to 24, 26.7% from 25 to 44, 23.2% from 45 to 64, and 20.6% who were 65 or older. The median age was 41 years. For every 100 females, there were 82.4 males. For every 100 females 18 and over, there were 78.4 males.

The median income in the city for a household was $27,441 and for a family was $35,321. Males had a median income of $28,530 versus $21,367 for females. The per capita income for the city was $17,251. About 14.0% of families and 19.2% of the population were below the poverty line, including 25.6% of those under 18 and 16.9% of those 65 or over. As of August 2010, the city's unemployment rate stood at 20%.

== Economy ==
The city's chief industry for many early years was the manufacture of plug chewing tobacco. The Henry County area became known as the "plug tobacco capital of the world". In the wake of the collapse of the plantation economy following the American Civil War, the local economy was reeling. Stepping into the breach were several thriving plug firms, which sold their merchandise across the nation beginning in the 19th century.

Local families were heavily involved in these companies, bestowing their names on them and reaping sizeable profits until the early 20th century, when the tobacco monopolies created by R.J. Reynolds and James Buchanan Duke bought out most firms. (In most cases, in bold anti-competitive moves, the two tobacco titans simply shut down their acquisitions overnight. These actions resulted in a U.S. government lawsuit against American Tobacco Company.) Among the earliest of these firms were D.H. Spencer & Sons and Spencer Bros. Other families soon joined in founding other early firms, including the Gravelys, the Comptons, the Ruckers, the Wittens, the Lesters and the Browns.

The city's main industry for a century was furniture construction, and today, Virginia furniture makers still reside in the region.

On the retail front, Liberty Fair Mall opened in 1989. In 2014, it was renamed the Village of Martinsville.

On October 28, 2021, Colorado-based apparel and footwear company VF Corporation announced it would continue to expand in Martinsville, creating 82 new jobs, while investing $10 million into the area. Other companies such as Georgia Pacific, Radial, Inc., Crown Holdings, and Eastman Chemical Company are also located in the area.

== Government ==
=== Local government ===
The City of Martinsville operates under a council-manager government. The city council has five members who serve four-year terms. Every two years, the council elects a mayor and vice mayor from among its members. An appointed city manager controls daily operations and manages the city's activities. The law firm Sands Anderson serves as the city's attorney.

In April 2026, the city council released a forensic audit that studied large issues with financial controls during former City Manager Aretha Ferrell-Benavides's term of employment. While many expenses failed to comply with city policy and best financial practices, they were not identified as rising to the level of fraud. Other issues included employment documentation and outsize travel and office expenses of the city manager's office. Reforms have been underway, including increasing financial controls, revisiting more than 25 policies, requiring council approval for changes to the budget, increasing oversight over hiring, and improving standards for documentation.

Current council members:

- LC Jones, Mayor
- Kathy Lawson, Vice Mayor
- Aaron Rawls
- Rayshaun Gravely
- Julian Mei

=== Federal, state, and county representation ===
The city of Martinsville and also Henry County is located in Virginia's 9th congressional district and is currently served by Republican Morgan Griffith. Martinsville is served by one member of the Virginia House of Delegates, Eric Philips (R-48th), and one member of the Virginia Senate, Bill Stanley (R-20th).

=== Politics ===
Beginning in the 1990s, Martinsville has consistently supported Democratic presidential candidates. In 2008, Barack Obama performed better in the city than any Democrat since 1944 with over 63% of the vote, and in all but one election since then, Democrats have continued to obtain over 60% of the vote.

United States presidential election results for Martinsville, Virginia
| Year | Republican | | Democratic | | Third party(ies) | |
| Year | No. | % | No. | % | No. | % |
|---|---|---|---|---|---|---|
| 1932 | 212 | 22.13% | 739 | 77.14% | 7 | 0.73% |
| 1936 | 255 | 21.11% | 949 | 78.56% | 4 | 0.33% |
| 1940 | 269 | 21.45% | 980 | 78.15% | 5 | 0.40% |
| 1944 | 458 | 29.49% | 1,093 | 70.38% | 2 | 0.13% |
| 1948 | 642 | 31.15% | 814 | 39.50% | 605 | 29.35% |
| 1952 | 1,772 | 55.83% | 1,391 | 43.82% | 11 | 0.35% |
| 1956 | 2,125 | 59.67% | 1,368 | 38.42% | 68 | 1.91% |
| 1960 | 1,729 | 49.16% | 1,699 | 48.31% | 89 | 2.53% |
| 1964 | 1,805 | 37.42% | 2,943 | 61.01% | 76 | 1.58% |
| 1968 | 2,618 | 35.98% | 2,727 | 37.48% | 1,931 | 26.54% |
| 1972 | 3,879 | 61.32% | 2,292 | 36.23% | 155 | 2.45% |
| 1976 | 3,147 | 45.38% | 3,491 | 50.34% | 297 | 4.28% |
| 1980 | 3,433 | 48.82% | 3,337 | 47.45% | 262 | 3.73% |
| 1984 | 4,234 | 58.37% | 2,942 | 40.56% | 78 | 1.08% |
| 1988 | 3,360 | 53.64% | 2,794 | 44.60% | 110 | 1.76% |
| 1992 | 2,690 | 40.65% | 3,073 | 46.44% | 854 | 12.91% |
| 1996 | 2,446 | 41.87% | 2,941 | 50.34% | 455 | 7.79% |
| 2000 | 2,560 | 44.96% | 3,048 | 53.53% | 86 | 1.51% |
| 2004 | 2,538 | 45.30% | 3,036 | 54.19% | 29 | 0.52% |
| 2008 | 2,311 | 35.44% | 4,139 | 63.48% | 70 | 1.07% |
| 2012 | 2,312 | 36.79% | 3,855 | 61.35% | 117 | 1.86% |
| 2016 | 2,149 | 36.38% | 3,533 | 59.81% | 225 | 3.81% |
| 2020 | 2,165 | 36.01% | 3,766 | 62.63% | 82 | 1.36% |
| 2024 | 2,155 | 37.99% | 3,435 | 60.55% | 83 | 1.46% |

== Transportation ==
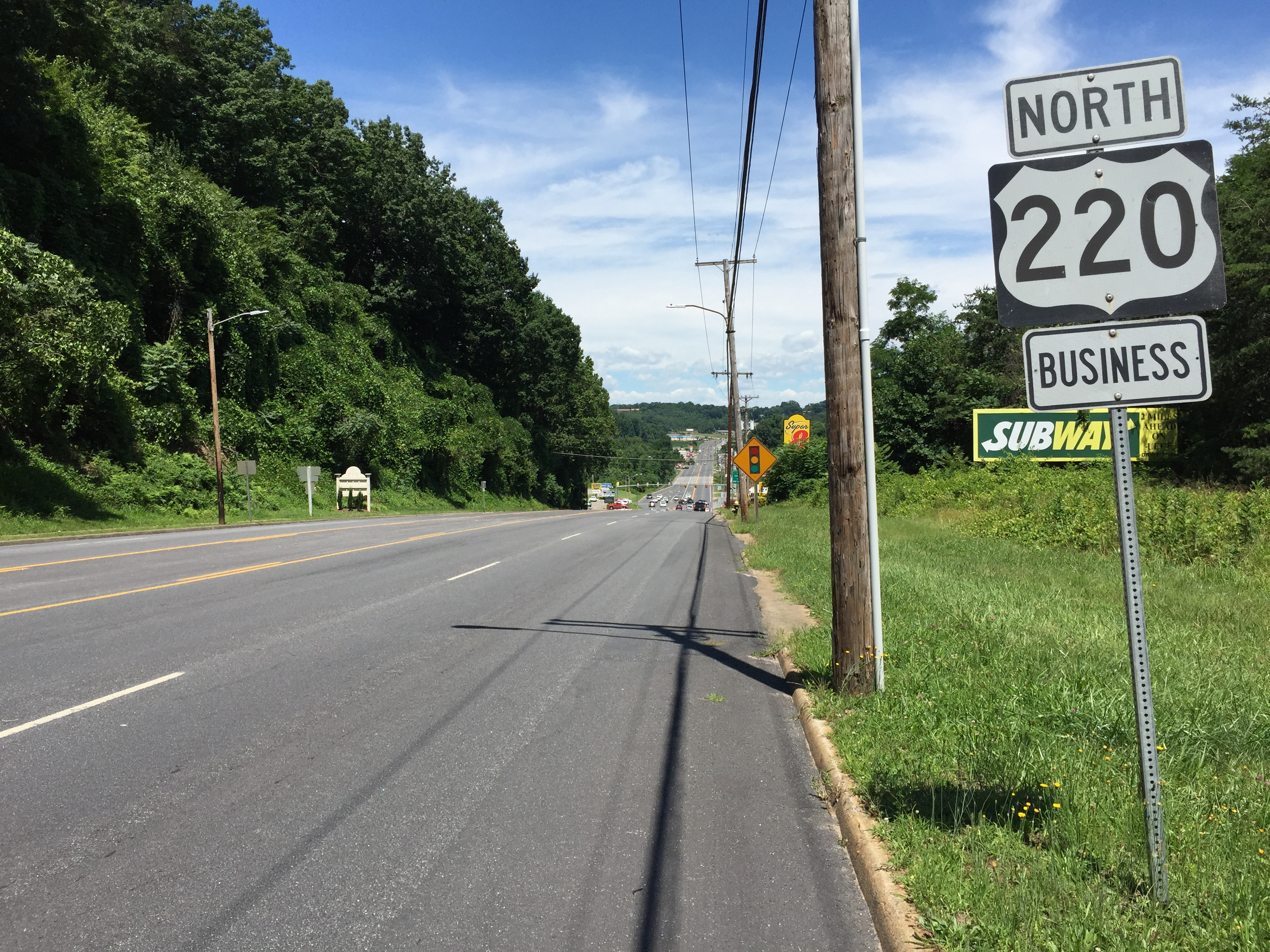
U.S. Route 220 in Martinsville

=== Interstate highways ===
- I-73 (future)
- US 58
- US 220
- SR 57
- SR 87
- SR 108
- SR 174
- SR 457

=== Public transportation ===
The Piedmont Area Regional Transit (PART) operates and serves the city of Martinsville. Routes include parts of both Martinsville and Henry county.

=== Air ===
Martinsville is served by two commercial airports. Roanoke–Blacksburg Regional Airport (IATA: ROA) in Roanoke, and Piedmont Triad International Airport (IATA: GSO) in Greensboro, North Carolina.

The Blue Ridge Airport, used for general aviation, is located 9 miles (14 km) outside the city.

== Education ==
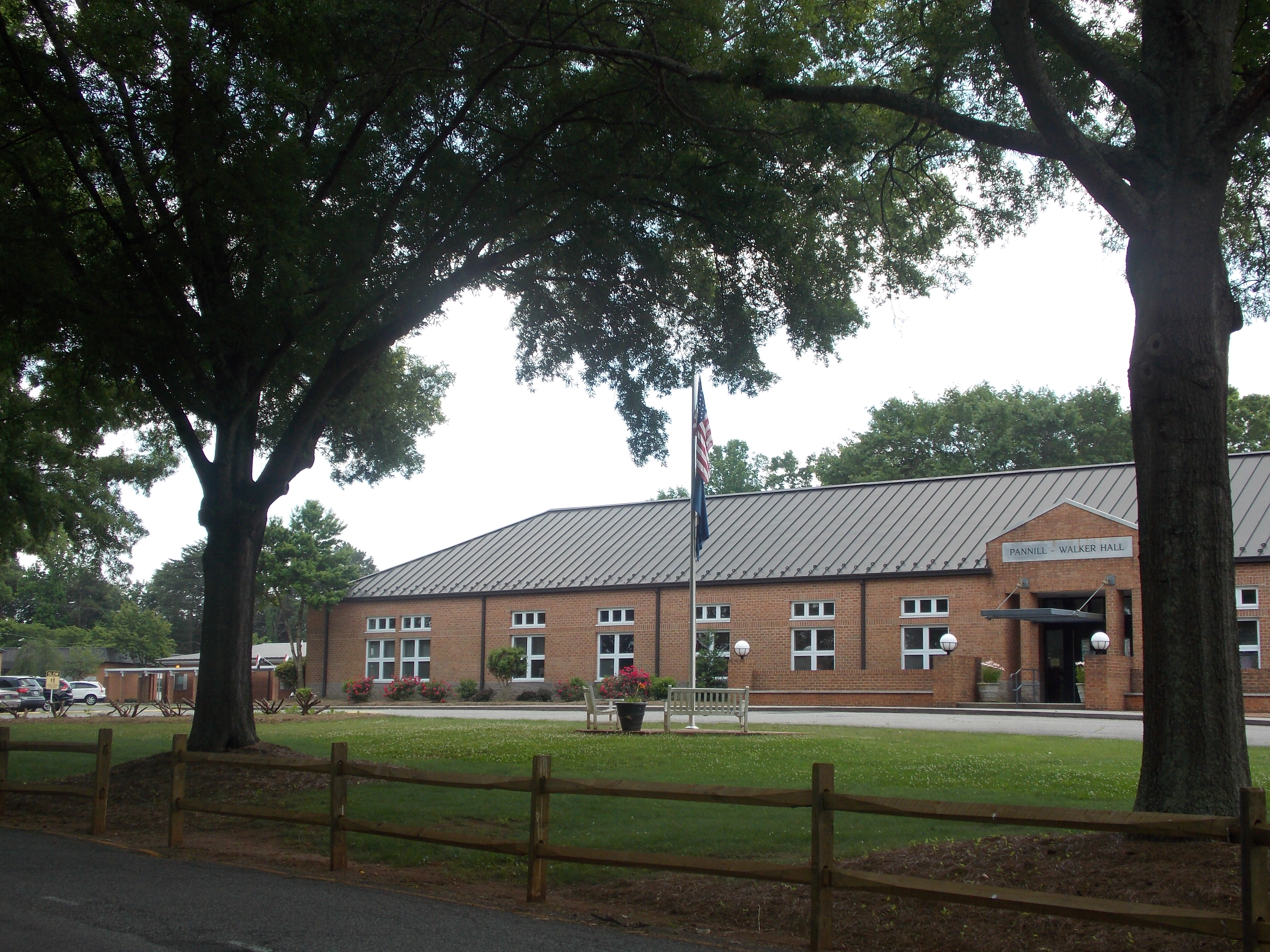
Carlisle School

The city is served by Martinsville City Public Schools. There are five public schools in Martinsville:

- Martinsville High School, opened in 1968 and serves roughly 580 students in grades 9–12.
- Martinsville Middle School, originally built as a high school in 1939 and serves roughly 430 students in grades 6–8.
- Albert Harris Elementary School, opened as a high school in 1958 and now serves roughly 490 students in kindergarten through fifth grade. The school is named after Albert Harris, an African-American minister who was a key advocate for the education of local African-American children.
- Patrick Henry Elementary School, opened in 1950 and serves roughly 435 students in kindergarten through fifth grade. The school is named after founding father Patrick Henry.
- Clearview Early Childhood Center, opened as an elementary school in 1954 and now serves roughly 140 students in preschool as part of the Virginia Preschool Initiative.

Piedmont Governor's School for Mathematics, Science, and Technology is a magnet school serving both 11th & 12th grade students who take advanced courses.

The city is also home to the K-12 private school, Carlisle School. The school serves approximately 400 students, about 130 of them are high school students. The School was established in 1968

Colleges and universities in Martinsville include the New College Institute and Patrick & Henry Community College, where students can also take satellite courses through Old Dominion University.

== Religion ==
Houses of Worship in Martinsville:

- First Baptist Church
- Broad Street Christian Church
- Christ Episcopal Church
- Christ's Church
- First Baptist Church of East Martinsville
- Fayette Street Christian Church
- First UMC Uptown Ministry Center
- First Presbyterian Church
- Refuge Temple Holiness Church
- Galilean House of Worship
- Starling Avenue Baptist Church
- Hope Presbyterian Church
- Temple Baptist Church
- Rich Acres Christian Church
- Woodland Heights Free Will Baptist Church
- Fellowship Church of Our Lord Jesus Christ
- Mountainview Missionary Baptist Church
- CrossPoint Church

== Arts and culture ==
- Piedmont Arts Association: Established in 1961, this non-profit museum is a museum partner of the Virginia Museum of Fine Arts and is accredited by the American Alliance of Museums
- Virginia Museum of Natural History: Established in 1984, non-profit museum affiliated with the Smithsonian Institution

=== Events and festivals ===
- Henry County Fair: An annual Fair held every September at the Martinsville Speedway.
- Martinsville Uptown Oktoberfest: An annual family friendly event held in Uptown Martinsville featuring music, crafts, beer gardens, food, and many children's activities.
- Wine by the River Festival
- Rooster Walk Music & Arts Festival
- Martinsville Kiwanis Pancake Day: An annual fundraiser for the Kiwanis Youth Foundation that provides scholarships to the youth in the Martinsville-Henry County community

== Sports ==
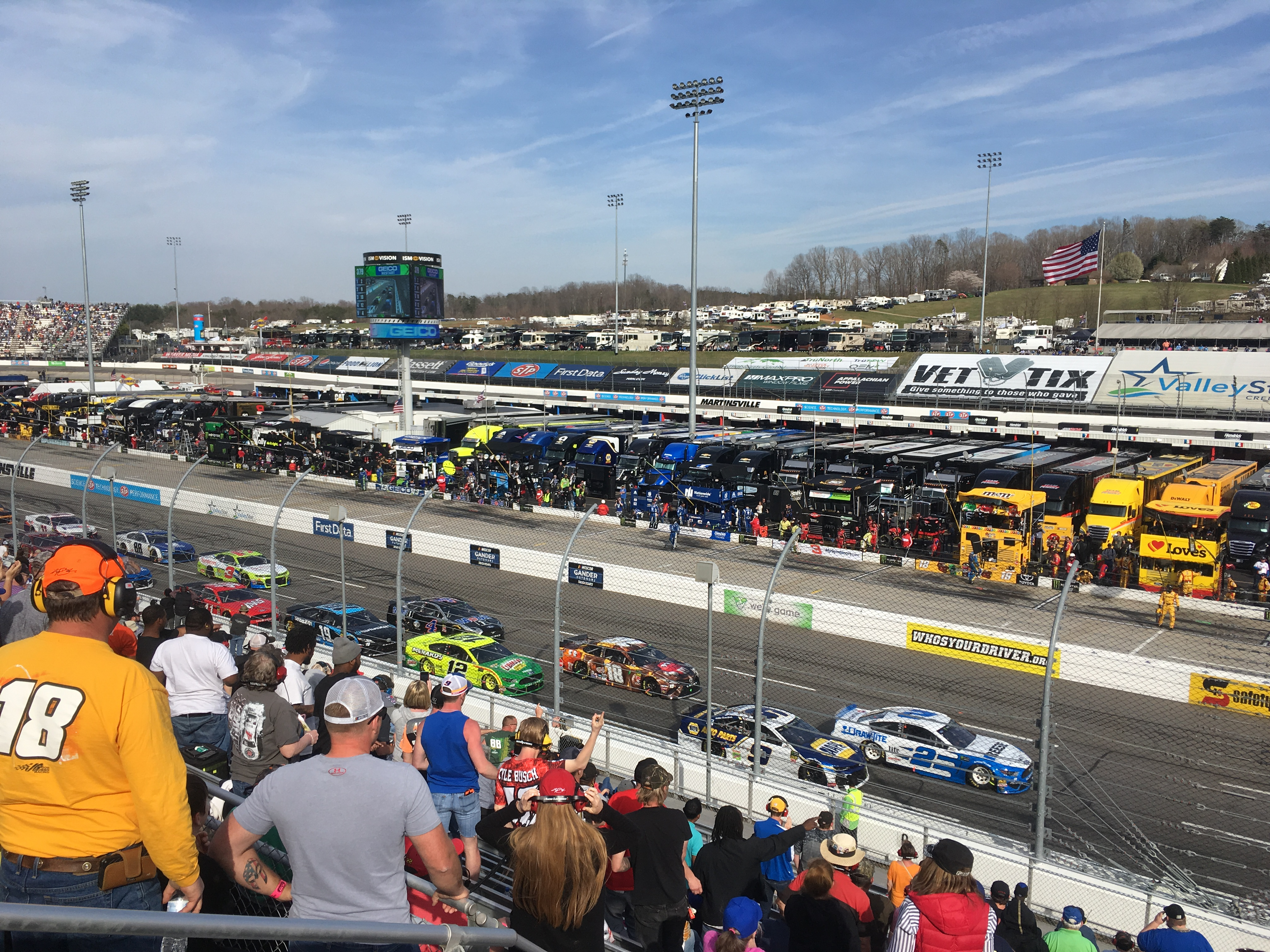
2019 STP 500 at Martinsville Speedway

Martinsville is home to the Martinsville Mustangs of the Coastal Plain League, a collegiate summer baseball league. The Mustangs play at Hooker Field in Martinsville. The Mustangs began play for the league's 2005 season. Martinsville was also home to two Minor league baseball teams, Martinsville Astros and Martinsville Phillies both Class-A affiliates of the Houston Astros and Philadelphia Phillies respectfully.

The Martinsville area is also home to Martinsville Speedway, which opened in 1947. The NASCAR Cup Series and NASCAR Xfinity Series hosts two races there every year while the NASCAR Craftsman Truck Series hosts one race there every year. The speedway also host the NASCAR Whelen All-American Series.

== Notable people ==
- Rabih Abdullah – NFL player
- Dana Olden Baldwin – physician, businessman, veteran
- Baton Bob − Costumed street performer,
- Noel T. Boaz- American anthropologist
- Buddy Arrington – former NASCAR driver
- John Robert Brown – American politician
- William Fields Carter (1908–1999) — member of the Virginia House of Delegates
- Fred Dove – racing driver
- H. Clay Earles – NASCAR team owner, founder and chairman of Martinsville Speedway
- Greg Gaines – NFL player
- Tony Gravely – UFC fighter
- Clinton Gregory — American singer-songwriter
- Carl Hairston – NFL player
- George Hairston — plantation owner, former sheriff of Henry County, Brigadier General, War of 1812
- Robert Hairston — American politician
- Jeremy O. Harris — actor and playwright
- Patrick Henry — American Founding Father (resided at Leatherwood Plantation, Henry County, outside current city limits)
- Odell Hodge — played college basketball at Old Dominion University and former professional basketball player
- Randy Hundley — former Major League Baseball player & coach
- Todd Hundley — former Major League Baseball player
- Hodgetwins — stand-up comedians
- Magdalen Hsu-Li — American singer-songwriter
- George Hairston Jamerson — brigadier general during World War I
- Kristen-Paige Madonia — novelist and creative writing teacher
- Joseph Martin — American Revolutionary War general, legislator
- Delvin Joyce — NFL player
- Matur Maker — professional basketball player
- Thon Maker — NBA player for Milwaukee Bucks
- J. C. Martin — former MLB player for New York Mets, 1969 World Series champion
- Barry Michaels — American radio personality
- Clyde Minter — racing driver
- Shawn Moore — NFL and Canadian Football League player
- Alison Parker — former journalist and news reporter for WDBJ
- Jesse Penn — Football player
- Albert Lee Philpott- American politician
- Josh Shilling - American musician
- Jessamine Shumate — Virginia artist
- Whitney Shumate — businessman, civic leader
- Thomas B. Stanley-Governor of Virginia
- Gregory Swanson — practiced law in Martinsville until 1957
- Robert Tuggle — author, director of the archives at the Metropolitan Opera, Grammy-nominated
- Dennis L. Via — former Commanding General of the United States Army Materiel Command (AMC)
- Marilyn Tavenner — American politician
- Sonny Wade — Canadian Football League player
- "Sweet Lou" Whitaker — MLB player for Detroit Tigers, 1978 AL Rookie of the Year, 1984 World Series champion
- Kennon C. Whittle — judge, Virginia Supreme Court of Appeals
- Stafford G. Whittle — judge, Virginia Supreme Court of Appeals
- Red Top Young — American singer-songwriter

== Media ==
=== Print ===
- Martinsville Bulletin, Martinsville's daily newspaper serving the city of Martinsville and Henry County, Virginia and is owned by Berkshire Hathaway.

=== Television ===
Martinsville is served by television stations in the Roanoke/Lynchburg television market. In addition Martinsville also receive television stations in the Greensboro/Winston-Salem/High Point television market.

- WDBJ, CBS affiliate based in Roanoke
- WSLS, NBC affiliate based in Roanoke
- WSET, ABC affiliate based in Lynchburg
- WFXR, Fox affiliate based in Roanoke
- WWCW, Fox affiliate based in Lynchburg
- WZBJ, an independent station, based in Roanoke, licensed in Danville
- WPXR, ION affiliate based in Roanoke

=== Radio stations ===
- WHEE 1370, broadcast station based in Martinsville
- WROV-FM 96.3, commercial FM radio station licensed to Martinsville

== Gallery ==
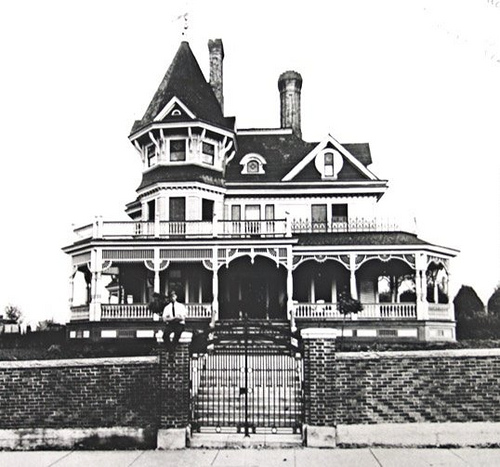
Home of Henry Clay Lester, early tobacco manufacturer, Main Street, Martinsville. Home burned in the early 1940s

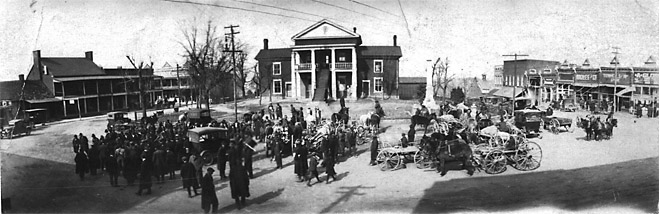
Henry County Courthouse Square, Martinsville, circa 1890.

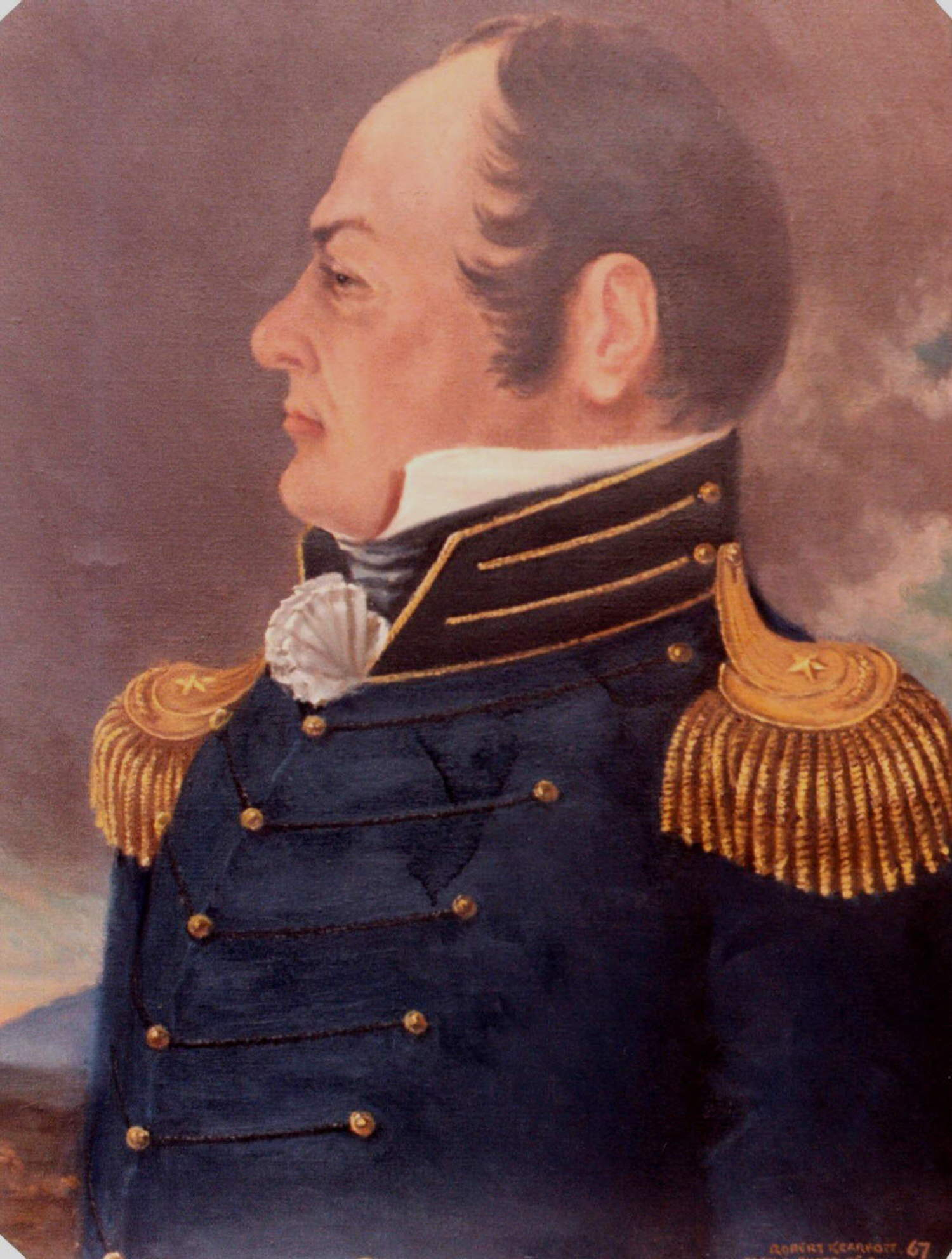
General Joseph Martin (1740–1808), born Albemarle County, Virginia, died Henry County, Virginia

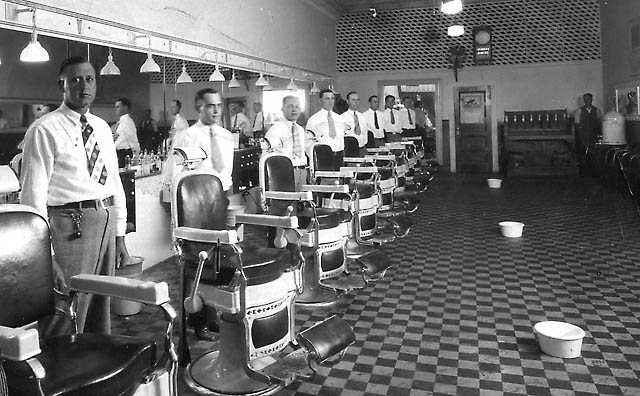
Staff of Draper's Barber Shop, Franklin Street, Martinsville, 1920. White bowls on floor are spittoons

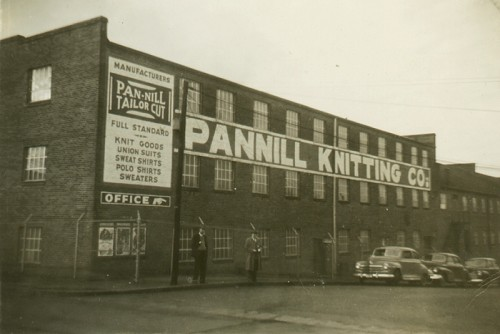
Pannill Knitting Company, early Martinsville textile concern founded in 1926

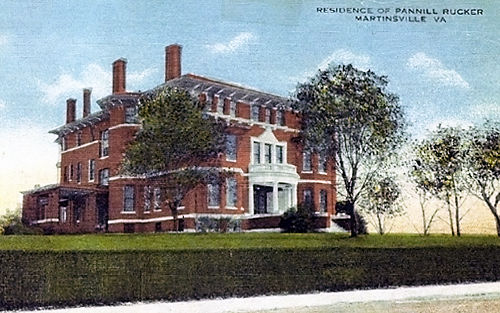
Oak Hall, home of Col. Pannill Rucker, early Martinsville tobacco manufacturer. Oak Hall burned February 19, 1917

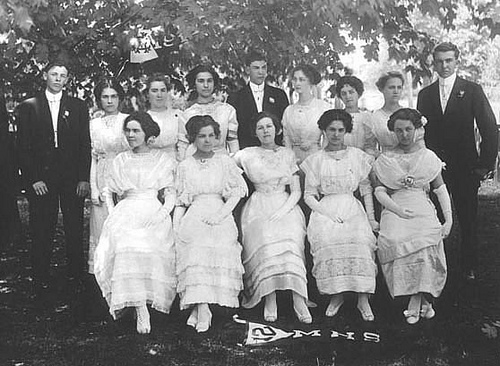
Class of 1912, Martinsville High School

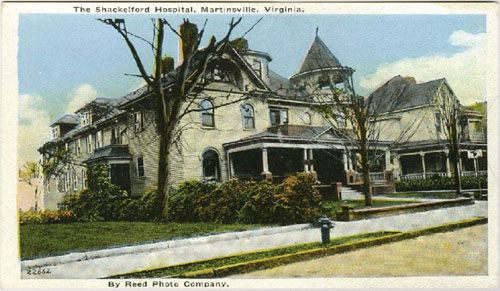
Shackelford Hospital, founded by Jesse Martin Shackelford, predecessor of Martinsville Memorial Hospital

== See also ==
- National Register of Historic Places listings in Martinsville, Virginia
- Martinsville Seven
- List of cities and counties in Virginia
