= Dana Olden Baldwin =

American physician

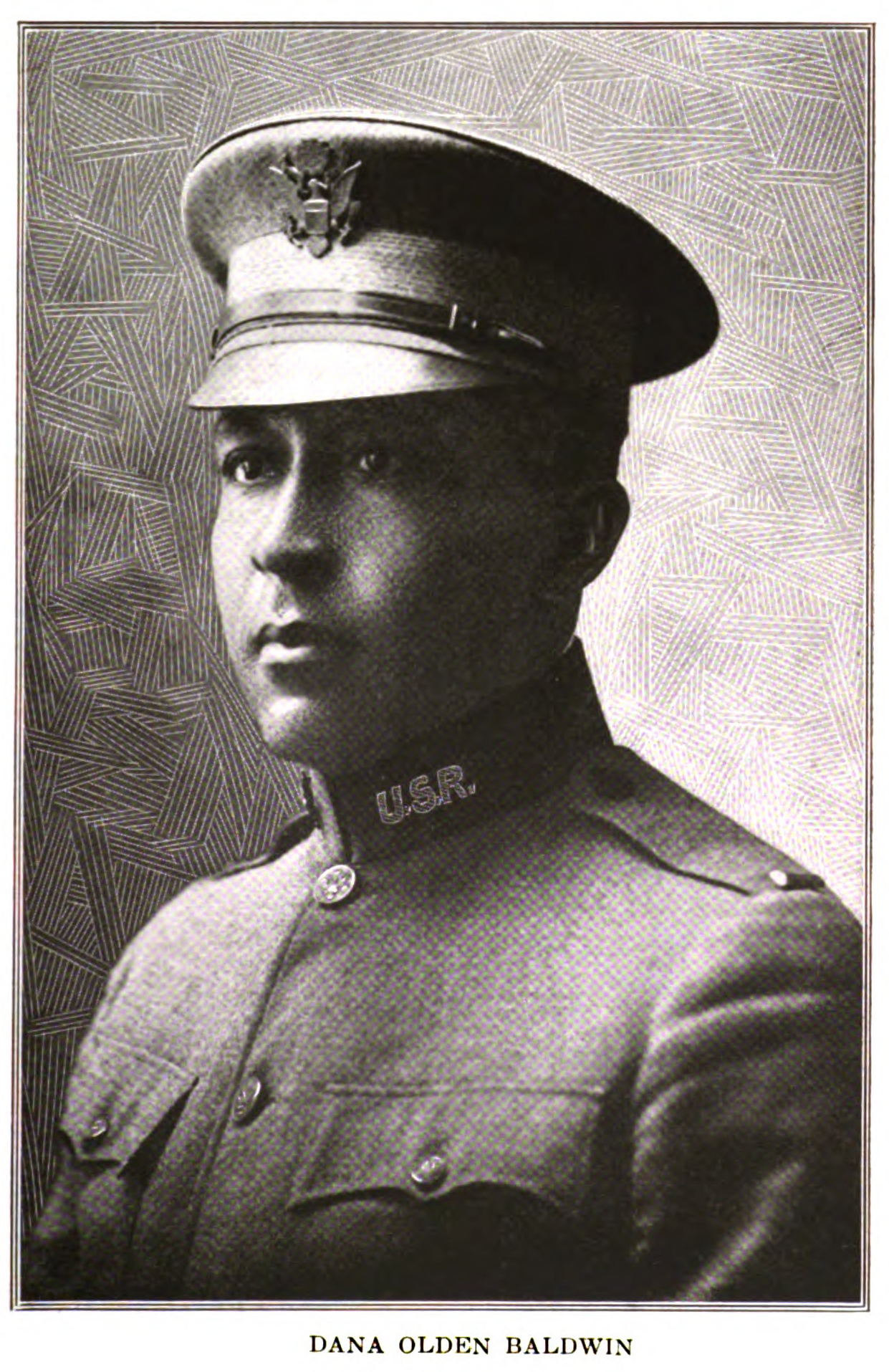
- Born: March 20th, 1881; Belvoir, North Carolina, US
- Died: November 9, 1972 (aged 91); Martinsville, Virginia, US
- Resting place: Baldwin Family Cemetery, Apex Wake County, North Carolina, US
- Education: Shaw University(BA, 1900) Leonard Medical School (MD, 1910)
- Occupations: Physician, Businessman
- Title: First Lieutenant
- Spouse: Vina A. Flood
- Children: J. Mae and Rosa Belle (adopted); Dr. Harold Baldwin, Willie Edwards, Curtis Higginbothom, Martha Sapry (foster)

Dana Olden Baldwin, M.D. (March 20, 1881– November 9, 1972) was a prominent African American physician in Martinsville, Virginia. He served in World War I as a medical officer until he was honorably discharged in 1918. In addition to his medical practice, Baldwin was a successful African American businessman, with ventures including the Baldwin Business Center, St. Mary's Hospital, and Sandy Beach Resort. His businesses operated under the racial segregation of Jim Crow laws, which prevented Black customers from entry to white establishments. Baldwin Memorial Park was named in his honor.

== Early life & education ==
Baldwin was born on March 20, 1881, in Belvoir, North Carolina, and was the oldest child of Reverend James Hayes and Mary Crutchfield Baldwin. His father was a Methodist priest. Baldwin's paternal grandfather, Jerry Baldwin, and maternal grandmother, Margaret Crutchfield, were both enslaved. Baldwin worked as a farm laborer from a very young age while learning at home and eventually attending school. He graduated from the Apex Normal and Industrial Institute at the age of 16 in 1897. Baldwin then attended Shaw University, a historically Black college in Raleigh, North Carolina. Following graduation, Baldwin taught in public schools and worked as a waiter until his mother convinced him to pursue further education. Baldwin returned to Shaw University for the Leonard Medical School (see Leonard Hall (Shaw University)) and graduated in 1910.

Baldwin visited Martinsville, Virginia in 1910 and was encouraged to stay by Dr. Jesse Shackelford, who founded the first area hospital and helped modernize medicine in Henry County. Baldwin assisted Shackelford as an anesthesiologist, especially when making house calls to the surrounding area, but Jim Crow laws made it difficult for African Americans to access care. Baldwin opened his own medical practice in a home on Fayette Street to provide care for the area's Black population.

On December 24, 1911, Baldwin married Vina S. Flood, adopted daughter of Lewis F. and Elizabeth Flood. Lewis Flood was a founding member of the St. Paul Baptist Church on High Street in Martinsville and served as the clerk. Vina was educated at the Hartshorn Memorial College and taught in a number of local public schools, including Martinsville Christian Institute. Dr. Baldwin and Vina adopted two daughters, J. Mae and Rosa Belle, and fostered several children.

When the United States entered World War I in 1917, Baldwin immediately volunteered at age 36.

== Military service ==
Upon entry into the military, Baldwin was commissioned to the Medical Reserve Corps and sent for basic training at Fort Des Moines Provisional Army Officer Training School. Military service was racially segregated during WWI. Following an influx of African American volunteers and ongoing advocacy by the NAACP and Historically Black colleges and universities (HBCUs), the first officer candidate class for African Americans was held at Fort Des Moines in 1917. Baldwin was awarded the rank of First Lieutenant. However, there was still some discontent at the facility as many soldiers found that he had been unfairly assessed for merely being Black. This or friction with his superior may have been a factor in Baldwin submitting his resignation from the 368th Ambulance Company of the 92nd Division, 317 Sanitary Train post he had been assigned. Despite this resignation request, the Army deployed Baldwin to France, where he served the remainder of WWI.

Once he arrived in France, Baldwin had the main responsibility of handling sanitation concerns, surgery duties and hospital illnesses. Much of the 92nd Infantry Division was engaged in trench warfare and were aiding the French in pushing back the German forces, who sent a large number of gas attacks into the field. However, Baldwin found himself mostly concerned with the outbreak of influenza which came in September 1918 (see Spanish Flu). A large portion of the Baldwin's patients mostly consisted of illness. The war came to a close in 1919, and Baldwin was honorably discharged on April 2.

== Career & civic life ==
Following his military service, Baldwin and his wife Vina stayed briefly in Philadelphia, where he practiced in the new field of radiology. The couple returned to Martinsville in 1919, where he resumed his medical practice. Baldwin worked to uplift the Black community in other ways as well. In the Virginia edition of The History of the American Negro, Dr. Baldwin stated that in order for the African American community to prosper, people should start "by advocating and working for better schools, better churches... by seeing to it that children are instructed in civic duty in the schools and taught the importance and power of the ballot.

Fayette Street in Martinsville had long been a local center of Black society, including churches, schools, and businesses. Having built a home there prior to WWI, Baldwin brought his entrepreneurial vision to Fayette Street. Baldwin bought land and created a lumber yard with a cement block-making machine, which he put to good use by building the Baldwin Business Center on Fayette Street, commonly known as "Baldwin's Block." The Baldwin Business Center opened in 1922. It was the first shopping center for African Americans in Martinsville and included a theater, pool hall, barber shop, beauty parlor, drug store, and medical and dental offices. Baldwin opened a number of other businesses in the 1920s and 1930s, including the Sandy Beach Resort, Baldwin Miniature Golf Course, and Baldwin's Gymntorium.

Finding safe lodgings was difficult for Black travelers during segregation. Baldwin's Pharmacy is listed as a location in The Negro Motorist Green Book, perhaps acting as an entry point for travelers to the local African American community, as well as recommending the safe lodgings to be found at the Douglas Hotel on Baldwin's Block or the Sandy Beach Resort on the Smith River .

Public spaces like doctor's offices and hospitals operated under strict racial segregation at this time. Recognizing this need in Martinsville, Dr. Baldwin opened a small hospital over the pharmacy owned by his younger brother, Sam Baldwin, in 1926. It was named St. Mary's, in honor of his mother who had encouraged him to study of medicine, and treated the poor African American population unable to afford or enter other hospitals. When Baldwin's Block suffered a devastating fire in 1928, St. Mary's was rebuilt and expanded to a 27-bed facility, and operated until 1952. Baldwin continued his medical practice for 60 years.

In addition to his medical practice and many business ventures, Dr. Baldwin was an active congregant in the A.M.E. Church and member in several fraternal and professional societies including the Masons, the Odd Fellows, the Knights of Pythias, Magic City Medical Society (Roanoke) and The National Medical Association. Local veterans met in the Baldwin-Rex Theater in January 1930 and formed the Homer Dillard Post No. 78 of the American Legion; Baldwin named Post Commander.

Baldwin also contributed to local cultural celebrations. An annual Fiddler's Contest held along Fayette Street raised money for St. Mary's Hospital in the 1930s and 1940s. Dr. Baldwin and his brother Sam coordinated the June German Ball in Martinsville, bringing national big band and jazz performers to the city for an all-night dance. "Germans" were popular dances founded in the post-Civil War era, and were extremely popular in North Carolinian African American communities where Baldwin grew up. The Martinsville June German Ball was first held in 1938 and continued as an annual celebration for nearly thirty years, with recent efforts to restart this tradition.

== Death & legacy ==
Dana Olden Baldwin died of a stroke on November 9, 1972. He was buried in Wake County, North Carolina, in the Baldwin Burial site, where a number of his family are also interred. Baldwin's brother Sam inherited the businesses, but died soon afterwards. Following Sam's death, the businesses closed and the buildings fell into disrepair. The structures were demolished by the city as part of urban renewal initiatives in the 1970s. The site was excavated by the Virginia Department of Historic Resources in 2007. Several artifacts from Baldwin's Pharmacy were found and used to prompt recollections for oral histories.

Baldwin is well-remembered in the Martinsville community and beyond. Virginia Humanities dedicated the Dr. Dana O. Baldwin Memorial Park, located one street over from where Baldwin Block once stood. Fayette Street is now home to the New College Institute, providing educational opportunities from K-12 programs to specialized trades to degree programs; the main building on their campus is the Baldwin Building, completed in 2014. Baldwin was honored as one of the Strong Men & Women in Virginia History by the Library of Virginia in 2018.
