= Whitney Shumate =

American businessman and civic leader

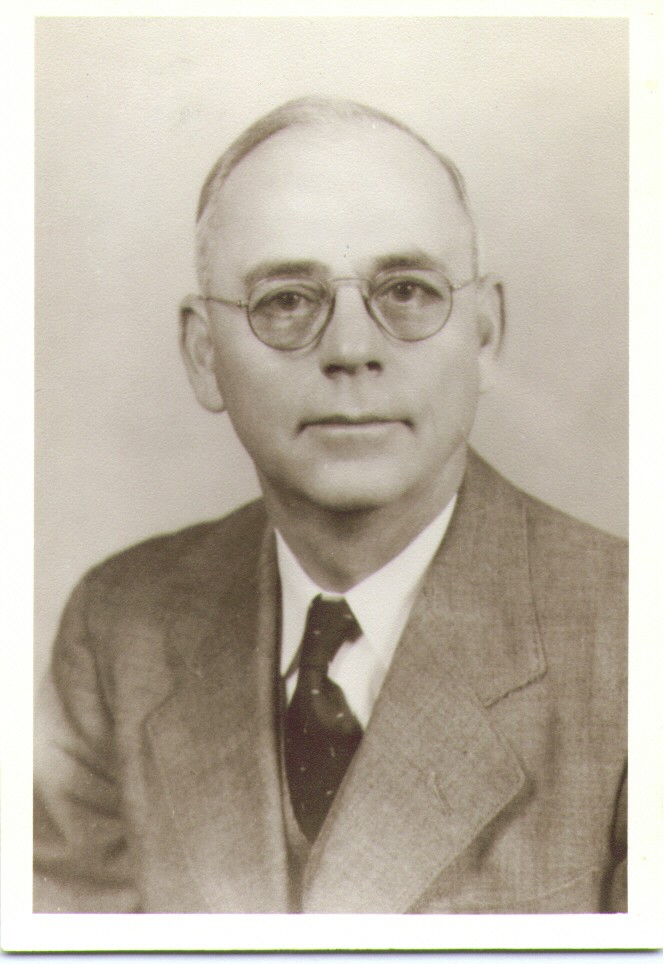
- Born: July 16, 1896; Rock Run, Virginia
- Died: February 28, 1966 (aged 69); Martinsville, Virginia
- Occupations: Businessman, civic leader
- Known for: Affordable housing; urban renewal

Whitney Shumate (July 16, 1896 - February 28, 1966) was a businessman and civic leader in Henry County, Virginia, and especially in Martinsville, Virginia.

== Early life ==
Whitney Shumate was born in Rock Run, Virginia, near Bassett, Virginia in rural Henry County, Virginia. His father was John Wesley Shumate and his mother was Martha Wells Shumate, who died soon after childbirth. His first name was given in honor of the inventor, Eli Whitney, but due to the sudden death of his mother, he never received a middle name. Whitney was the youngest of ten children. His father later remarried, to Susan "Susie" Ann Philpott, and the couple then had six children by that marriage. As a boy, Whitney would take a different path in order to hunt and trap on the way back and forth to school, near the existing Rock Run School. What he caught was usually what they had for supper that night. John W. Shumate worked in tobacco Sharecropping, and the early years of his life was spent living in a log cabin alongside the Rock Run. From both his parents he received Methodist instruction in Social justice (his father was named after John Wesley) and the Wells family were also strong members of what is today the United Methodist Church. When Whitney was twelve years old the family moved to Martinsville, and he finished three years of high school there.

== Marriage ==
After a few years as a letter carrier in Martinsville, he began selling furniture and household goods. He married Jessamine Shumate. She later said in her autobiography, "While I was going to school in Martinsville, I met a young man named Whitney Shumate. We started dating and went together for three years before we were married. The family teased me, because Whitney had a large car and when he came to Preston, Virginia to visit, always took me and a few members of my family for rides. When he bought a coupe, everyone said he was getting serious and wanted to leave my family at home when he took me for rides! It must have been true, because we were married on December 13, 1922."

Whitney and Jessamine Shumate had two daughters, Ada Margaret S. Hadden (Mrs. William J. Hadden) and Jessamine "Jeppy" White S. Calhoun. His grandson and namesake, Whit Haydn, is a magician and entertainer.

== Business enterprises ==
Whitney began several businesses before settling on furniture sales. He established the "Shumate Furniture Store" in Martinsville, later named the "Shumate-Jesse Furniture Store". He also was involved in development, and constructed over 100 homes in Henry County for lower and middle class owners, both black and white. He especially worked to improve living conditions for black members of the community, constructing new homes that were affordable for the black residents.

Some of his early business projects didn't work. An early store went bankrupt and his partner fled the area. Whitney not only paid off his own debts, but he also paid off the ones owed by his partner in the business. The business leaders in Martinsville respected his integrity and honesty in business deals. He later became one of the directors and president of the Mutual Savings and Loan Association in Martinsville (an early Mutual savings bank). For the county, he was also a member of the "Board of Assessors" and the "Board of Equalization" for taxes.

== Fireworks store ==
He also started a firecracker store during the 1930s The store caught fire and burned down on December 12, 1936, but only after scaring the citizens of Martinsville who thought bank robbers were shooting up the town with machine guns when the firecrackers went up in the flames. "Whatever the cause, the fireworks lit up downtown Martinsville and the Saturday afternoon Christmas shopping crowd. The newspaper described it as 'pandemonium . . . deafening roars . . . a roaring blaze leaping the full height of the three-story building . . . skyrockets whistling across the square to land on the courthouse lawn . . . and bright red and white Roman candles rolling along the paved street.' Within a few seconds, the town square was empty of people. Several hundred residents had visualized everything from screaming comets, earthquakes, rebel air raids, bursting boilers and bank robbers with machine guns."

== Civic life ==
He became a Justice of the peace in 1945, and served for several years for Henry County. He was present at the county jail every Sunday morning to help release the Saturday night drunks. Whitney also was elected several times to the Martinsville City council. He also worked on the local Democratic Party (United States) offices, and was a member of the Martinsville Development Council.

== Affordable housing ==
Whitney Shumate was an early advocate of Affordable housing and slum clearance, especially for the black community in Henry County. Growing up in a log cabin, he was always acutely aware of the terrible effects of poor housing and a lack of electricity, water and sewage or even paved roads. During the time of racial segregation in Virginia, many of the blacks in Martinsville and Henry County were not able to either finance or acquire modern housing, especially for the growing black middle class in post-war Virginia. During the 1950s when segregation was still legal, and when many banks habitually refused loans to black families, Whitney Shumate worked to provide modern housing for the under-served population. By raising private funds, he was able to bring together private, corporate and banking interests to provide financing and access to banking services for the black community. He helped clear out a portion of Martinsville called "Mill Town", which had sub-standard rental housing originally provided in the 19th century for the defunct cotton mill employees. New homes were constructed in the neighborhood, built with sound materials and with all city services for the first time. What had originally been considered a depressed civic area rapidly became a center of progress as middle class blacks finally began to prosper. As an editorial in the local newspaper noted, "One of the projects which won him considerable attention and praise was the instigation of the redevelopment of what was once known as Martinsville Cotton Mill Village. He and associates purchased about 50 houses in North Martinsville, and using private capital rather than federal aid, rebuilt them into comfortably inhabitable homes, making it possible for many persons to purchase homes within their financial range."

== Death and burial ==
During a church service at the Broad Street Christian Church in Martinsville, where he was an elder, he suffered a heart attack, and after completing the communion service, went to the hospital where he died on February 28, 1966. The Martinsville Bulletin newspaper had an editorial that said: "Such was the nature of this unassuming man, whose integrity and ability were widely recognized and highly respected. Martinsville and Henry County are much better places in which to live because Whitney Shumate lived here and helped make it so in his quiet and unassuming manner." He is buried in Oakwood Cemetery in Martinsville, Virginia.
