= Piedmont Arts Association =

Art museum in Martinsville, Virginia, USA

Coordinates: 36.6844°N 79.8666°W

Piedmont Arts
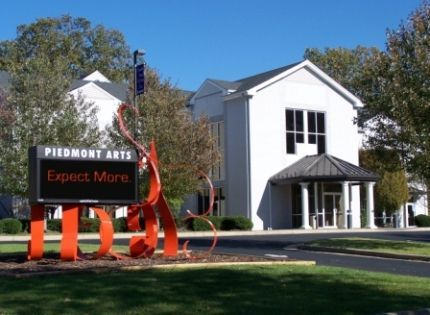
- Established: 1961
- Location: 215 Starling Avenue, Martinsville, Virginia
- Type: Nonprofit
- Website: www.piedmontarts.org

Piedmont Arts or the Piedmont Arts Association is a nonprofit art museum and educational outreach center in Martinsville, Virginia. It is a Museum Partner of the Virginia Museum of Fine Arts in Richmond and is accredited by the American Alliance of Museums.

== History ==
Piedmont Arts was founded in 1961 by a group of local artists, including Jessamine Shumate, when the Virginia Museum of Fine Arts encouraged the formation of a statewide network of local chapters. In 1976, E.I. DuPont deNemours Company agreed to lease the group the Lynwood House, a company house named for the first DuPont manager to reside there. The artists subsequently took the name Lynwood Artists and began curating exhibits by regional artists and craftsmen for display in the Lynwood House.

In 1976, the group incorporated under the name Piedmont Arts Association and in 1978 assumed the new status of Affiliate of the Virginia Museum of Fine Arts. In 1981, the heirs of Michael and Purnell Schottland donated the Schottland Estate to Piedmont Arts for use as a permanent facility. This donation led to a capital campaign for renovations. During the campaign Piedmont Arts raised more funds than required for renovations and the excess monies were used to establish an endowment for the organization.

In 1995, Piedmont Arts launched its Shared Vision Campaign, which was designed to raise funds to renovate the existing facility and add a new wing featuring gallery space, a classroom and a performance hall. In April 1997, Piedmont Arts held a groundbreaking for the new wing, which opened in April of the following year.

In April 2004, Piedmont Arts was awarded accreditation by the American Alliance of Museums after completing a year-long self study.

== Visual Arts ==
Piedmont Arts hosts up to six exhibits per year, featuring work by national and international artists. Major exhibits are displayed in the Hooker-Garrett, Pannill and Box Mezzanine galleries; three of the museum's six galleries. Work by local and regional artists is displayed in the museum's Lynwood Artists Gallery, which is named in honor of the group of artists that founded Piedmont Arts and that curates the gallery.

Piedmont Arts also brings public art to the Martinsville and Henry County through its public art program. The program includes six murals in Uptown Martinsville; 28 mobiles throughout the community; and four sculptures.

== R.P. Gravely-A.J. Lester Art Garden ==
In 2017, Piedmont Arts opened the R.P. Gravely-A.J. Lester Art Garden, an outdoor gallery of installation art, which features three sculptures by Virginia artists Ed Dolinger, Jessie Ward and Mark Wright. The Art Garden is also home to the museum's Little Post Office, which was founded in 1893 by John B. Anglin as a point on the United States postal service star route; and a 100-year-old Remarkable Tree of Virginia.

== Performing arts ==
In 1991, Piedmont Arts began a performing arts series. Over 20 years later, the On Stage series features up to five performances per year in a variety of genres. Some artists that have performed as part of the On Stage series include, Bela Fleck and the Flecktones, Step Afrika!, Sam Bush, Barrage, Cherish the Ladies and Aquila Theatre.

== Education ==
Piedmont Arts brings arts education programs into schools in Martinsville, Henry County and the surrounding areas of Virginia. Elementary through high school students are exposed to plays, musical performances and artist workshops through the museum's outreach programs. The museum also offers guided tours, gallery Treasure Hunts and free on-site crafts and games in the Discovery Room.

All art students in Martinsville and Henry County schools have the opportunity to display work in the museum's Foster Gallery, which features rotating exhibits of student work. This gallery is curated by the Charity League of Martinsville and Henry County.
