= Dry Bridge School =

- Dry Bridge Elementary School
- U.S. National Register of Historic Places
- Virginia Landmarks Register
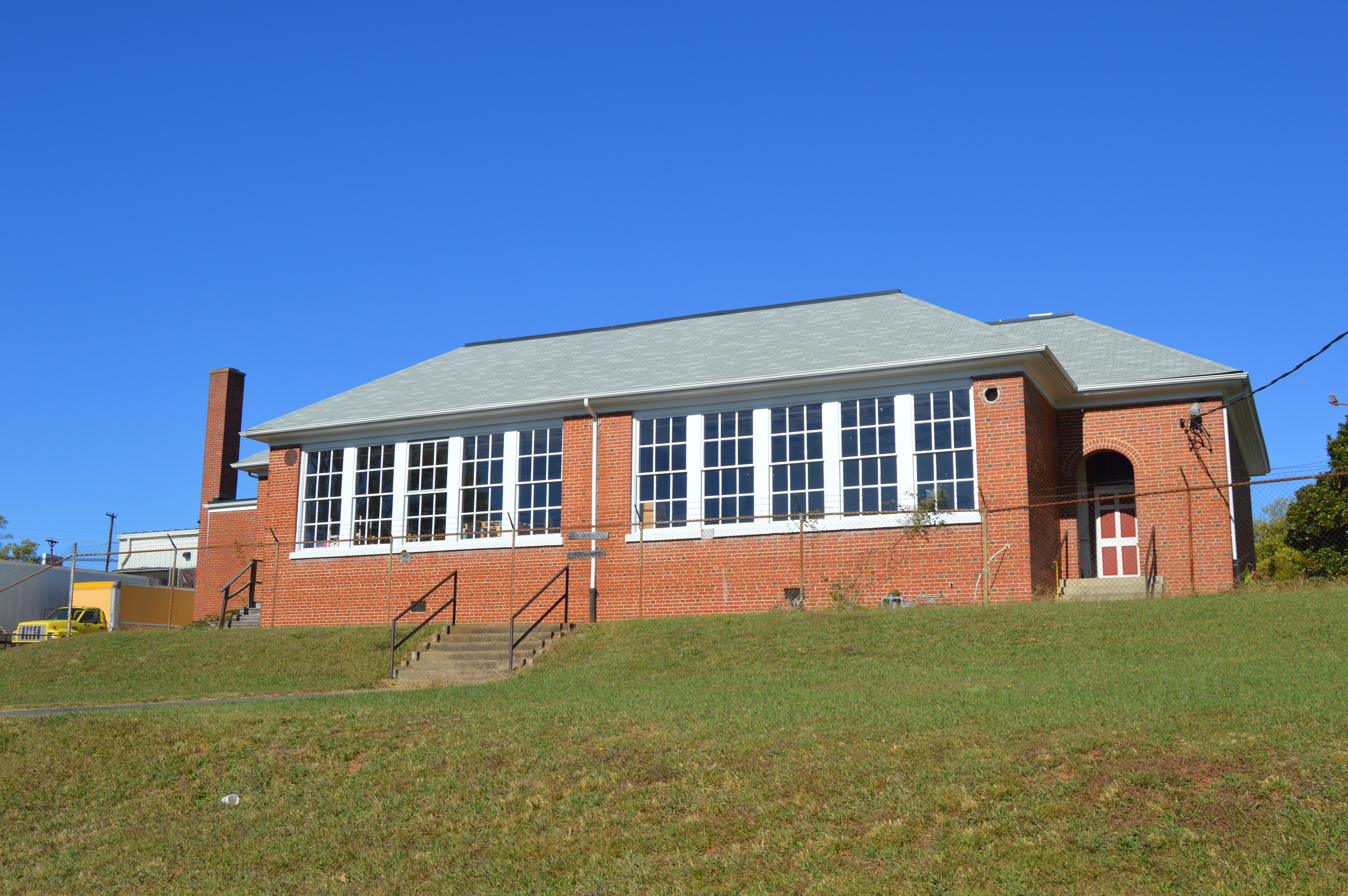
- Front and eastern end

- Location within Virginia Location within the United States
- Location: 1005 Jordan St., Martinsville, Virginia
- Coordinates: 36°41′31″N 79°50′55″W
- Area: 1.4 acres (0.57 ha)
- Built: 1928-1930
- Built by: Moore Lumber Co.; Finley, McCoy & Hinskey
- Architectural style: Classical Revival
- MPS: Rosenwald Schools in Virginia MPS
- NRHP reference No.: 09000065
- VLR No.: 120-5034

Significant dates
- Added to NRHP: February 25, 2009
- Designated VLR: December 18, 2008

Dry Bridge Elementary School, also known as East Martinsville Grammar School, is a historic Rosenwald school located at Martinsville, Virginia. It was built between 1928 and 1930, and is a one-story, rectangular brick building with a concrete foundation, brick walls and deck-on-hip roof. The building housed four classrooms. Annexation brought Dry Bridge School into the Martinsville School District in 1948, and a freestanding school addition was built beside Dry Bridge School in 1958. The two buildings were called the East Martinsville Grammar School. The school closed at the end of the 1967–1968 school year as the result of school desegregation in Martinsville. In 1969, MARC Workshop, Inc. began occupying the building.

It was listed on the National Register of Historic Places in 2008.
