= Scuffle Hill =

Historic house in Virginia, United States

- U.S. National Register of Historic Places
- U.S. Historic district – Contributing property
- Virginia Landmarks Register
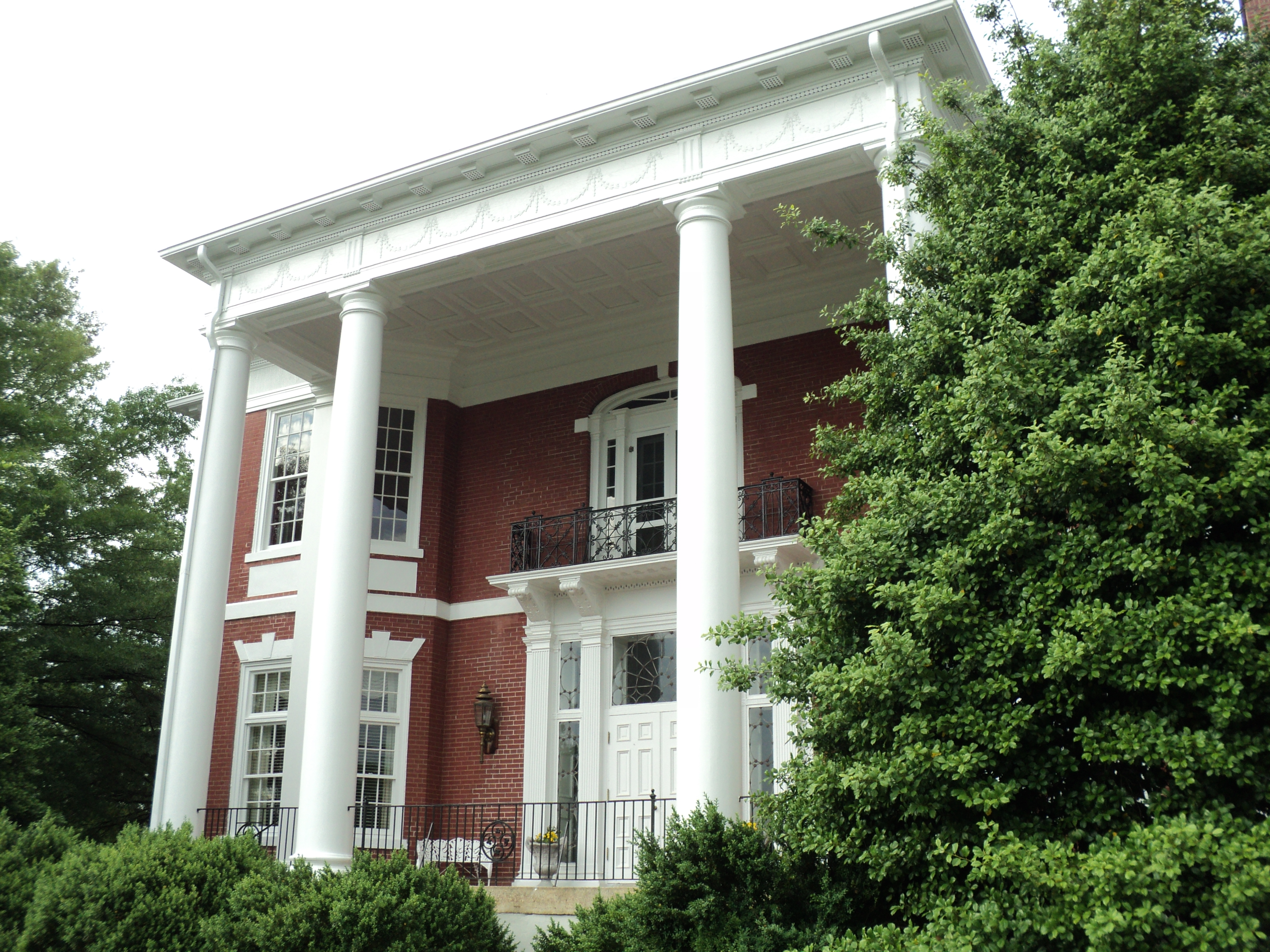
- Scuffle Hill, May 2010

- Location within Virginia Location within the United States
- Location: 311 E. Church St., Martinsville, Virginia
- Coordinates: 36°41′22″N 79°51′58″W
- Area: 2 acres (0.81 ha)
- Built: 1905, 1917-1920
- Architectural style: Colonial Revival
- NRHP reference No.: 97000158
- VLR No.: 120-0006

Significant dates
- Added to NRHP: February 21, 1997
- Designated VLR: December 4, 1996

Scuffle Hill is a historic home located at Martinsville, Virginia. It was built between 1917 and 1920, and it occupies the shell of an earlier house, built in 1905, which was gutted by fire in 1917. It is a two-story, brick mansion with a gable roof with dormers, two-story polygonal window bays, a poured concrete foundation, and granite belt courses. The front facade features a Doric order portico in the Colonial Revival style. The original house was built by tobacco magnate Col. Pannill Rucker and rebuilt and later owned by the Rives Brown family, and subsequently by the Pannill family, owner of Pannill Knitting. The home later became the parish house of Christ Episcopal Church. The home is named for the first plantation in Henry County, Virginia of Revolutionary War hero General Joseph Martin, who called his first acreage "Scuffle Hill," as he said he had to scuffle to come up with the money for it.

It was listed on the National Register of Historic Places in 1997. It is located in the East Church Street-Starling Avenue Historic District.
