= Fayette Street Historic District =

Historic district in Virginia, United States

- U.S. National Register of Historic Places
- U.S. Historic district
- Virginia Landmarks Register
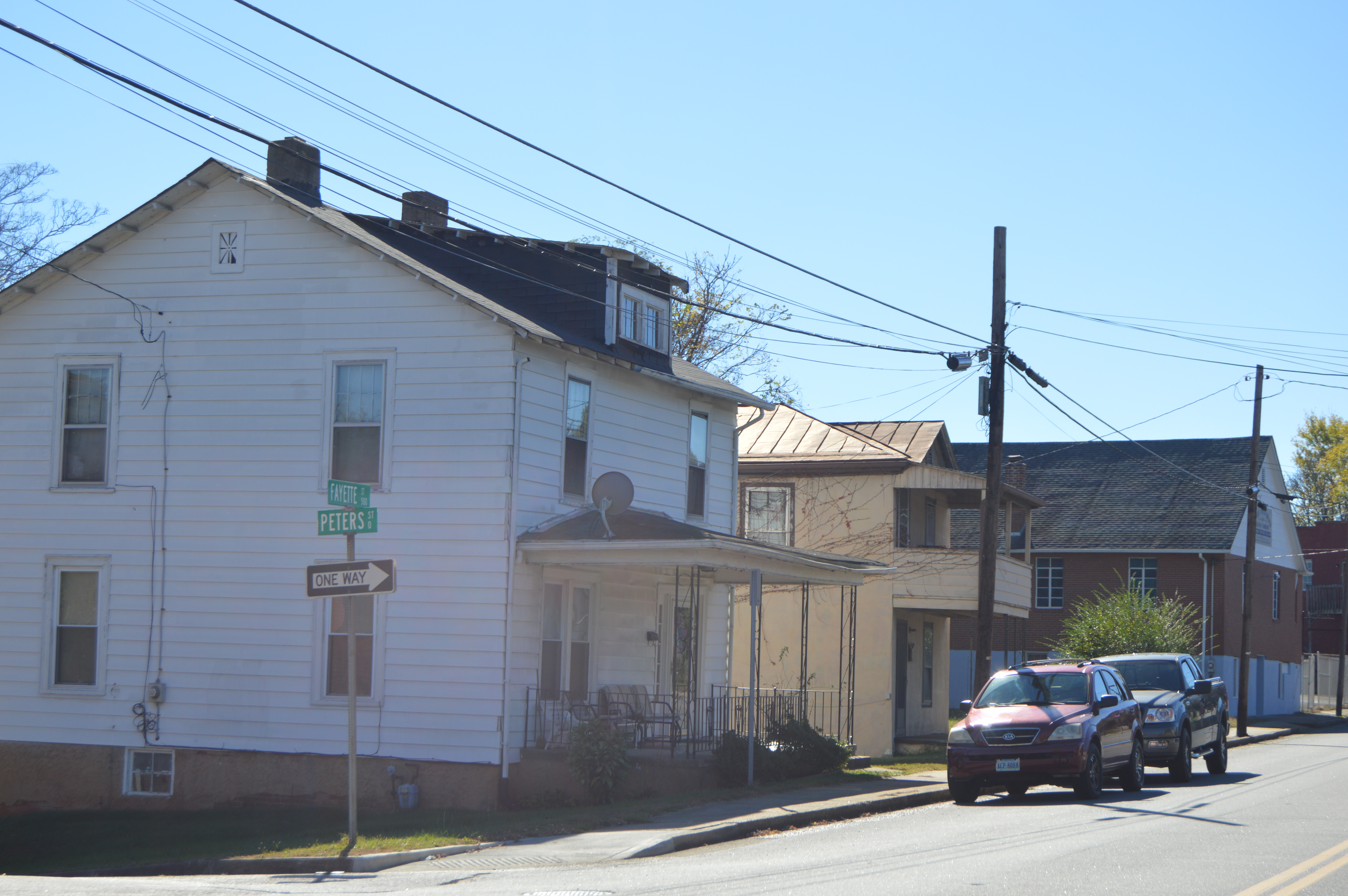
- Houses at the Peters Street intersection

- Location within Virginia Location within the United States
- Location: Fayette St. and side streets roughly bounded by Market, W. Church, Memorial and Swanson Sts., Martinsville, Virginia
- Coordinates: 36°41′33″N 79°52′54″W
- Area: 42 acres (17 ha)
- Architectural style: Late 19th And 20th Century Revivals, Late 19th And Early 20th Century American Movements
- NRHP reference No.: 07000395
- VLR No.: 120-5003

Significant dates
- Added to NRHP: May 2, 2007
- Designated VLR: March 7, 2007

Fayette Street Historic District is a national historic district located at Martinsville, Virginia. It encompasses 116 contributing buildings, in a traditionally African-American section of Martinsville. It includes a variety of commercial, religious, educational and residential buildings dating from the late-19th century through the mid- 20th century. Notable buildings include the Dennis Hairston House (c. 1910), community Market (1925), Mt. Carmel Church, Grace United Presbyterian Church (c. 1918), Albert Harris Intermediate School, Alex Hairston House (c. 1923), Baldwin Block, Watkins-Hairston Funeral Home (1931), Gordon Building (1941), and the Imperial Savings and Loan (1953).

It was listed on the National Register of Historic Places in 2007.
