= Martinsville Historic District =

Historic district in Virginia, United States

- U.S. National Register of Historic Places
- U.S. Historic district
- Virginia Landmarks Register
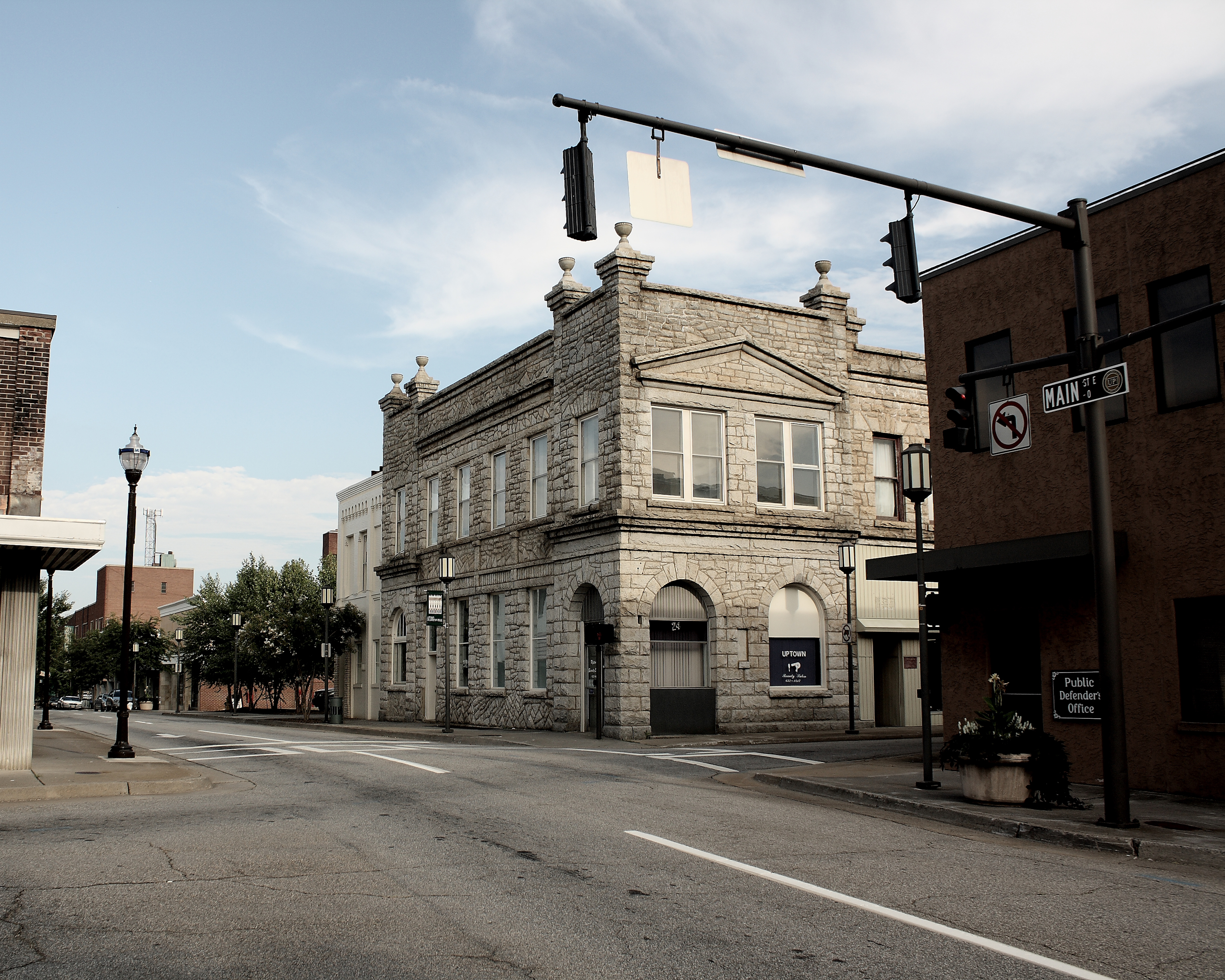
- Martinsville Historic District, July 2010

- Location within Virginia Location within the United States
- Location: Roughly bounded by VA 457, Danville RR tracks, Clay St., and Market St., Martinsville, Virginia
- Coordinates: 36°41′30″N 79°52′21″W
- Area: 45.5 acres (18.4 ha)
- Built: 1883
- Architect: Tucker, George, et al.
- Architectural style: Federal, Romanesque, Colonial Revival
- NRHP reference No.: 98001317 (original); 100008502 (increase); 100008501 (decrease)
- VLR No.: 120-5001

Significant dates
- Added to NRHP: October 30, 1998
- Boundary increase: December 27, 2022
- Boundary decrease: December 27, 2022
- Designated VLR: April 22, 1998

Martinsville Historic District is a national historic district located at Martinsville, Virginia. It encompasses 94 contributing buildings, 1 contributing site, and 3 contributing structures in the central business district of Martinsville. The buildings range in date from the early-19th century through the mid- 20th century and include notable examples of the Romanesque, Federal, and Colonial Revival styles. Notable buildings include the Henry County Courthouse (1824), People's Bank (1891), Globman's Department Store (c. 1915), Ford Building (1908), U.S. Post Office (1939), the Masonic Temple, the Henry Hotel (1921), the Martinsville Hotel (c. 1930), First National Bank Building (1925), the Knights of Pythias Building (1922), Oakley Apartment / Office Building (1935), the Chief Tassel Building (1930), First United Methodist Church of Martinsville (1922), Richardson's Motor Co. (c. 1918), Gravely Pin Factory (1907), and Sale Knitting Plant (1937).

It was listed on the National Register of Historic Places in 1998.
