= Martinsville Novelty Corporation Factory =

- U.S. National Register of Historic Places
- Virginia Landmarks Register
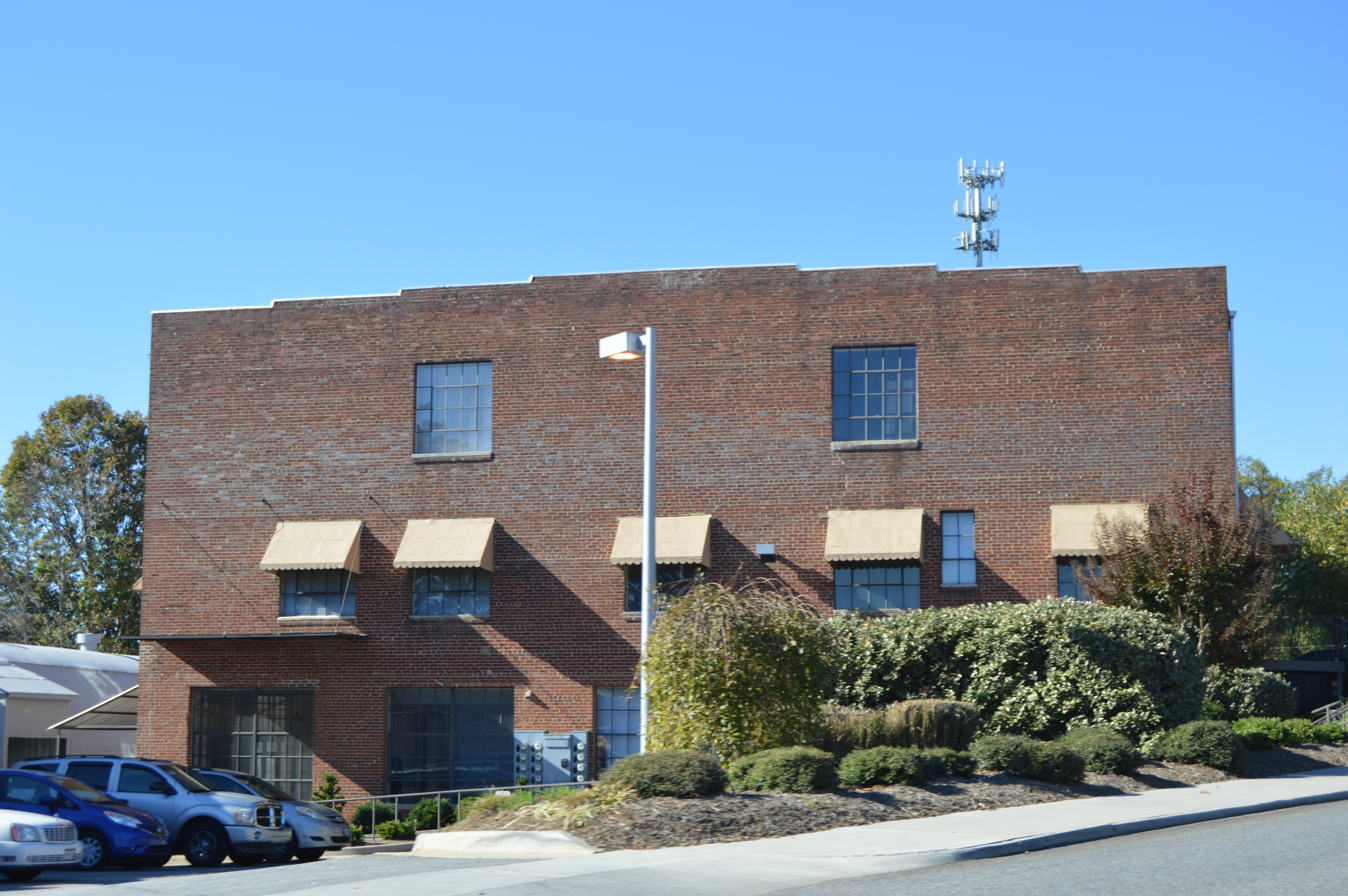
- Front of the factory

- Location within Virginia Location within the United States
- Location: 900 Rives Rd., Martinsville, Virginia
- Coordinates: 36°40′37″N 79°51′42″W
- Area: 3.6 acres (1.5 ha)
- Built: 1929
- NRHP reference No.: 10000282
- VLR No.: 120-5089

Significant dates
- Added to NRHP: May 21, 2010
- Designated VLR: March 18, 2010

The Martinsville Novelty Corporation Factory is a historic factory complex located at Martinsville, Virginia. The main factory was built in 1929, and is a long, three-story, brick building that was constructed for the purpose of manufacturing small pieces of furniture called "novelty" pieces in the furniture trade. Associated with the main factory are the contributing wood storage area and the kilns where the wood was dried; a long, metal Quonset hut; a railroad spur and trestle; a long concrete-block and frame storage building; and a small, rectangular, brick building that at one time housed a restaurant that served the employees of Martinsville Novelty and W. M. Bassett Furniture factory. The Martinsville Novelty Corporation was the last significant furniture concern established in Martinsville before the Great Depression. The factory closed in 1995.

It was listed on the National Register of Historic Places in 2010.
