= William J. Hadden =

American minister and politician

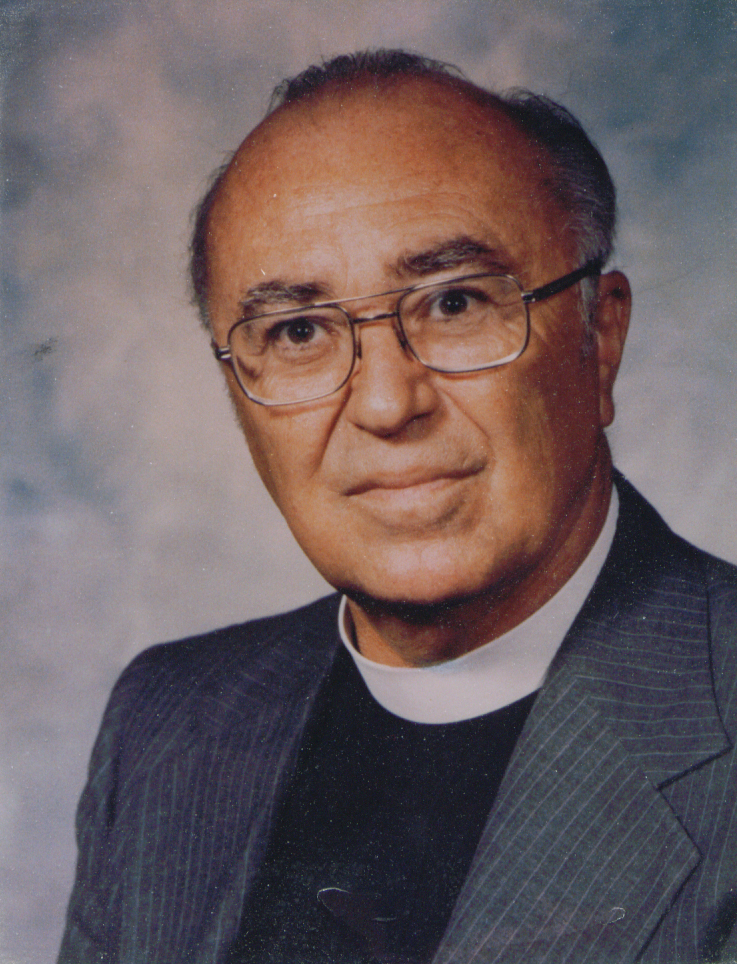
- The Reverend William James Hadden, Junior, 1921–1995

Personal details
- Born: William James Hadden, Jr. June 2, 1921 Maple Shade, New Jersey, U.S.
- Died: June 14, 1995 (aged 74) Greenville, North Carolina, U.S.
- Spouse: Margaret Shumate Hadden
- Education: Lynchburg College

William James Hadden Jr. (June 2, 1921 – June 14, 1995) was a Protestant minister of the Christian Church (Disciples of Christ) and a priest of the Episcopal Church (United States) He was also at different times both a military chaplain (both in the US Navy and the US Army), and a university Chaplain. He also served as a politician and community leader in Pitt County, North Carolina, and worked for the desegregation of Greenville, North Carolina.

== Early life ==
William "Bill" Hadden was born on June 2, 1921, in Philadelphia, Pennsylvania, but shortly afterwards his family moved to Maple Shade, New Jersey. His parents were William James Hadden, Sr., and Elizabeth Derr Hadden.

As a young man, he was very active in the Boy Scouts of America and was a Sea Scout. He married Margaret Shumate (daughter of Whitney Shumate and Jessamine Shumate) on August 28, 1944, and they had four children: Elizabeth Hadden Lunney; William James Hadden, III; Whitney W. Hadden (also known as Whit Haydn) and Robert Lee Hadden.

== Education ==
Hadden received his Bachelor of Arts degree in Philosophy at Lynchburg College in Lynchburg, Virginia, in 1944. He was a member of both the Kappa Delta Phi (fraternity), Eta Rho Chapter, and the Alpha Phi Omega fraternities. He received his Master of Divinity degree from the Graduate School of Education at Vanderbilt University in Nashville, Tennessee, as part of the V-12 Navy College Training Program, in 1946. He was awarded a second Master's degree from Austin Peay State University in 1957.

Hadden also completed special studies at the University of Edinburgh, the Graduate School of Theology at the University of the South, and participated in the Religious Education Program at New York University and other studies at Peabody College and East Carolina University.

== Churches ==
Hadden was ordained as a "Minister of the Gospel" by the Disciples of Christ Church on May 29, 1944, at the Euclid Avenue Christian Church (now Euclid Christian Church), Lynchburg, Virginia.

- Minister, Cork Street Christian Church (Disciples of Christ), Winchester, Virginia, from June 1946 until June 1949.
- Minister, First Christian Church (Disciples of Christ), Clarksville, Tennessee, from June 1949 until January 1959. While he was there, the church raised enough funds to construct a new educational building for the church.
- Minister, First Christian Church (Disciples of Christ), Greenville, North Carolina, from January 1959 until March 1969. "He was minister of Eighth Street Christian Church (1959–1969), when the congregation felt they needed to move to a larger church and grounds. He led the congregation in planning and building First Christian Church and loved the people in the congregation and was very proud of the church they built together."

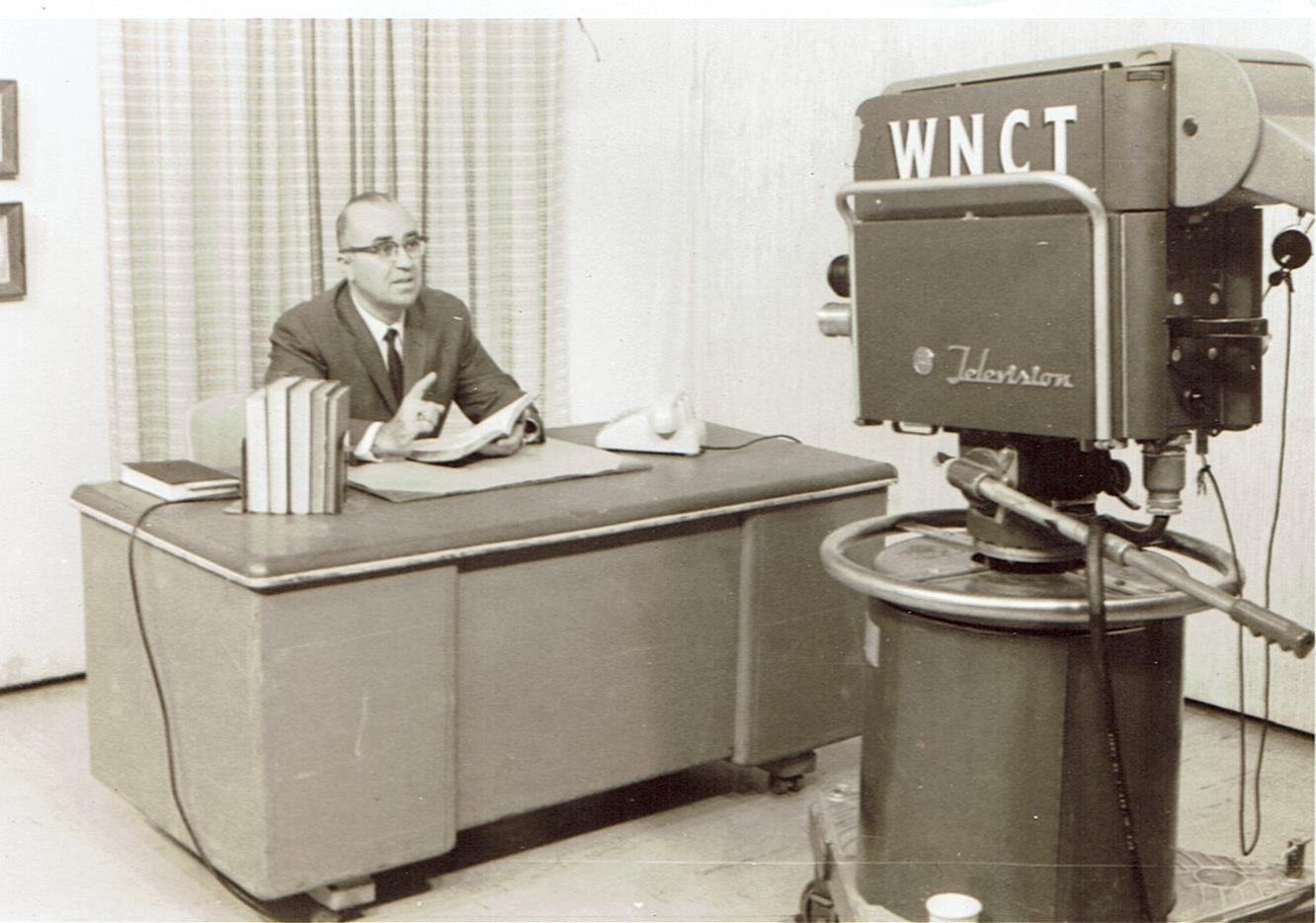
The Rev. William J. Hadden, Jr., on the set for his television program, "Lessons for Learning," on WNCT-TV from 1961–1966.

- For five years, he wrote and conducted a half hour weekly religious program at 8:00 am each Sunday morning on WNCT-TV, called "Lessons for Living." The series included Bible stories, fables from other countries and stories that enhanced moral decisions. Some of the stories told included local stories, such as from the local North Carolina folklorist and good friend, Judge Charles H. Whedbee.

Hadden was ordained in the Episcopal Church by Tom Wright (Bishop of East Carolina) and Bishop Hunley A. Elebash, at St. Paul's Episcopal Church in Greenville, North Carolina, on August 24, 1968.

- Episcopal Chaplain, East Carolina University from 1968 to 1984.
- Associate rector, St. Paul's Episcopal Church, Greenville, North Carolina, Episcopal Diocese of East Carolina, from 1969 to 1985.
- Priest-in-Charge, Emmanuel Episcopal Church, Farmville Historic District (Farmville, North Carolina) from 1971 to 1990. "In 1977 Bishop Hunley Elebash asked Bill if he would become Priest in Charge of the small Emmanuel Episcopal Church in Farmville. This charge lasted for thirteen years, and it was a very happy time in our lives."

== Military ==
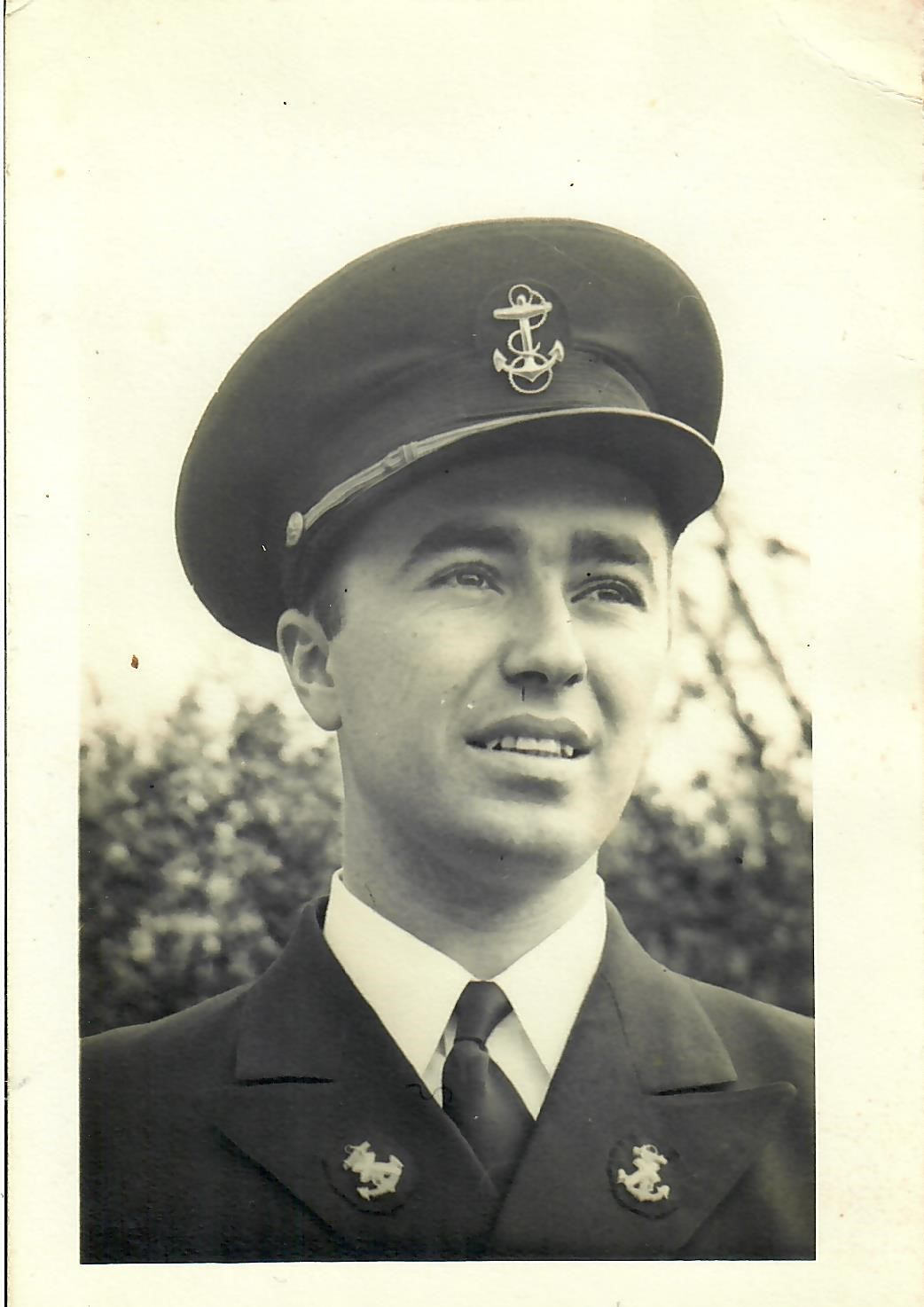
William James Hadden as US Navy Chaplain Cadet at Vanderbilt University, 1945

Hadden served as a stateside military chaplain in the US Navy as a Lieutenant (junior grade) during World War II, from June 1944 until December 1949. Awarded the American Campaign Medal and the World War II Victory Medal (United States).

He then transferred to the Tennessee National Guard and also served as a chaplain serving as a Captain in the United States Army Reserve during the Korean War, from December 1949 until July 1954.

== Civil Life and Desegregation ==
Hadden was the first chairman of Greenville's "Good Neighbor Council" formed of black and white citizens united to fight Racial segregation. The Good Neighbor Council was formed by Terry Sanford, governor of North Carolina from 1961 to 1965, and this was the forerunner of the state's Human Relations Council, now the North Carolina Human Relations Commission. Terry Sanford encouraged local Good Neighbor Councils to consider, promote and adjudicate in questions of programs of racial nature. This eight person, biracial commission was the first group to promote the legislation of the Civil Rights Act of 1964 in eastern North Carolina. The Greenville Good Neighbor Council was cited by the city, county and state officials as the most significant agency in assisting the community in weathering a most traumatic period. Hadden was its chairman for six years.

One of the early shocks during this period was the effectiveness of the Black Christmas boycott of 1963, when black citizens boycotted white businesses over the Christmas season because of discrimination in employment downtown Greenville.

Hadden was elected six times to the City Council of Greenville, North Carolina, and served for twelve years, from 1975 to 1977 and again from 1979–1989.

While a city council member, he also participated in the Greenville Transit Commission, the Greenville Housing Authority, and the Community Bicycle Safety Program. While on the Greenville Housing Authority, he worked to end the substandard housing for blacks along the Tar River waterfront in town, many of which did not have adequate water or sewage systems in their homes. He was also instrumental in the formation of "Evergreen" a downtown revitalization program for Greenville.

He also served as mayor pro tem of Greenville, North Carolina, from 1985 to 1987.

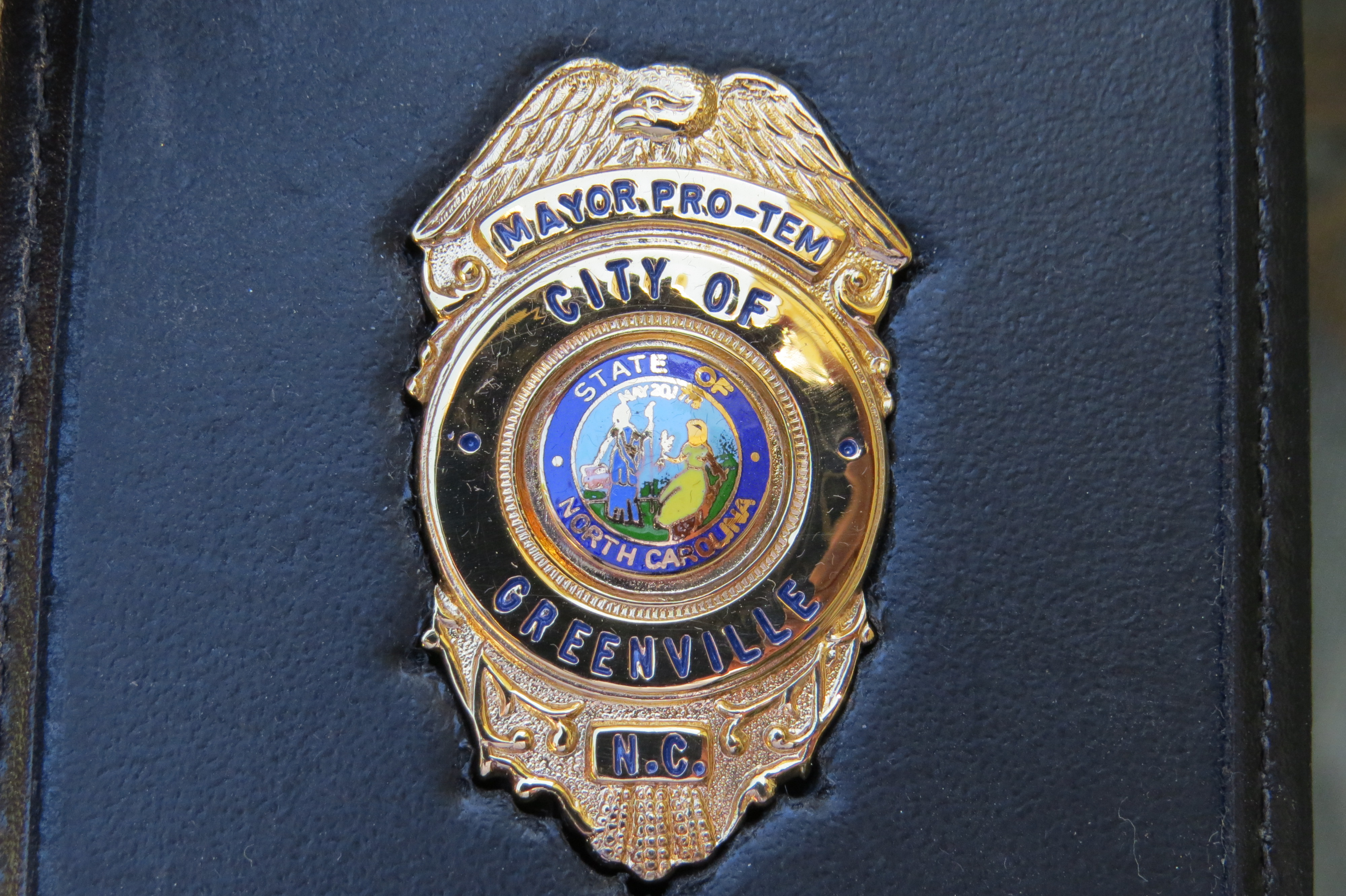
Police Badge, Greenville, North Carolina

As even a temporary mayor, he was in charge of all the city departments, and was presented with an honorary police Badge by the Greenville Police Department.

In 1986 he was awarded the North Carolina chapter of the United States Junior Chamber of Commerce's "Outstanding Elected Official for the State."

For a number of years he was active in different community groups. He was on the board of directors when the group was formed in 1978, and was elected president of the Friends of Libraries group for East Carolina University in 1981. William Hadden was also the president of the Friends of the Sheppard Memorial Library. He also served on the board of directors for the Pitt County Mental Health Board and the United Fund.

== Tour Guide ==
Hadden traveled to Scotland and Israel during the 1950s on a study grant from the Disciples of Christ Church. He later found that a travel company in Nashville, Tennessee, would pay his way if he acted as a Tour guide for ten or more people to Europe, and so he found twenty people and was also able to take his wife along for free. They were able to get tickets to the Oberammergau Passion Play in 1960. He would also lead several other tours to Europe and the Holy Lands throughout the later 1960s, and later took another study tour of Anglican university chaplains in England for the Episcopal Church in 1983. "Taking tour groups to Europe is the hobby of the Rev. Bill Hadden, Episcopal Chaplain at East Carolina University and until five years ago an ordained minister in the Christian Church. Hadden has extensive experience in writing as he served as writer of Sunday School material for the Christian Board of Publication, contributed a weekly column for seven years in The Tennessean of Nashville, and has been published in The Christian and The Pulpit Digest."

== Death ==
After a series of three strokes, Hadden died on June 14, 1995, and is buried in Pinewood Memorial Cemetery, in Greenville, North Carolina.
