= National Register of Historic Places listings in Henry County, Virginia =

Location of Henry County in Virginia

This is a list of the National Register of Historic Places listings in Henry County, Virginia.

This is intended to be a complete list of the properties and districts on the National Register of Historic Places in Henry County, Virginia, United States. The locations of National Register properties and districts for which the latitude and longitude coordinates are included below, may be seen in an online map.

There are 19 properties and districts listed on the National Register in the county.

This National Park Service list is complete through NPS recent listings posted March 6, 2026.

== Current listings ==
	Name on the Register	Image	Date listed	Location	City or town	Description
1	John D. Bassett High School	John D. Bassett High School	February 3, 2006 (#05001587)	State Route 57; 36°45′44″N 79°59′47″W	Bassett	
2	Beaver Creek Plantation	Beaver Creek Plantation	May 9, 1985 (#85000984)	State Route 108; 36°43′11″N 79°52′53″W	Martinsville	
3	Belleview	Belleview	June 10, 1974 (#74002129)	South of the Joseph Martin Highway; 36°36′28″N 79°53′17″W	Ridgeway	
4	Edgewood	Edgewood	March 29, 2007 (#07000231)	150 Old Stage Rd. 36°44′19″N 79°57′03″W	Stanleytown	
5	Eltham Manor	Eltham Manor	August 5, 1999 (#99000960)	405 Riverside Dr. 36°44′06″N 79°57′47″W	Bassett	
6	Fairy Stone State Park Historic District	Fairy Stone State Park Historic District	April 10, 2007 (#07000338)	967 Fairystone Lake Dr. 36°47′48″N 80°07′00″W	Stuart	
7	Fieldale Historic District	Fieldale Historic District	February 22, 2008 (#08000072)	Roughly bounded by 10th St., River Rd., Patrick Ave., and Chestnut St. 36°41′59″N 79°56′18″W	Fieldale	
8	Grassdale Farm	Grassdale Farm	May 30, 2002 (#02000587)	187 Spencer Penn Rd. 36°37′02″N 80°00′33″W	Spencer	
9	The Highlands	The Highlands	February 13, 2018 (#100002136)	510 Edgewood Dr. 36°44′16″N 79°56′53″W	Stanleytown	
10	Ingleside	Ingleside	August 5, 1999 (#99000963)	500 Mica Rd. 36°35′48″N 79°51′23″W	Ridgeway	
11	Marshall Field and Company Clubhouse	Marshall Field and Company Clubhouse	June 1, 2005 (#05000523)	2692 River Rd. 36°41′35″N 79°55′48″W	Fieldale	
12	Martinsville Fish Dam	Martinsville Fish Dam	January 21, 1974 (#74002128)	Smith River below the Rives Rd. bridge 36°39′14″N 79°52′17″W	Martinsville	
13	Old Turner Place	Old Turner Place	November 21, 2002 (#02001371)	7643 Henry Rd. 36°49′44″N 79°59′55″W	Henry	
14	Rock Run School	Rock Run School	November 16, 2005 (#05001268)	532 John Baker Rd. 36°43′00″N 79°58′52″W	Fieldale	
15	Spencer-Penn School	Spencer-Penn School	May 26, 2005 (#05000482)	30 George Taylor Rd. 36°36′54″N 80°00′49″W	Spencer	
16	John Redd Smith Elementary School		July 1, 2021 (#100006500)	40 School Dr. 36°43′07″N 79°54′38″W	Collinsville	
17	R.L. Stone House	R.L. Stone House	August 16, 2006 (#06000708)	3136 State Route 57; 36°45′20″N 79°59′05″W	Bassett	
18	Stoneleigh	Stoneleigh	November 24, 1982 (#82001820)	Oak Level Rd. 36°44′05″N 79°56′48″W	Stanleytown	
19	Virginia Home	Virginia Home	May 24, 2000 (#00000495)	986 Field Ave. 36°42′20″N 79°56′23″W	Fieldale	

== See also ==
- List of National Historic Landmarks in Virginia
- National Register of Historic Places listings in Virginia
- National Register of Historic Places listings in Martinsville, Virginia
