= General Henry =

General Henry may refer to:

- Sir George Henry Waller, 3rd Baronet (1837–1892), British Army major general
- Guy Henry (equestrian) (1875–1967), U.S. Army major general
- Guy Vernor Henry (1839–1899), Union Army major general
- James D. Henry (1797–1834), Illinois Militia brigadier general in the Black Hawk War
- John B. Henry Jr. (1916–2013), U.S. Air Force major general
- Richard C. Henry (1925–2020), U.S. Air Force lieutenant general
- William W. Henry (1831–1915), Union Army brevet brigadier general
- Prince William Henry, Duke of Gloucester and Edinburgh (1743–1805), British Army general

== See also ==
- Attorney General Henry (disambiguation)
