= Henry, Virginia =

Henry is the name of two places in the Commonwealth of Virginia in the United States of America:

- Henry, Franklin County, Virginia
- Henry, Sussex County, Virginia
