= George Waller =

George Waller may refer to:

- George Waller (VC) (1827–1877), English recipient of the Victoria Cross
- George Waller (footballer) (1864–1937), English footballer and cricketer
- George Waller (judge) (1911–1999), British judge
- George Waller (colonel) (1734–1814), American Revolutionary War colonel
- George Platt Waller (1889–1962), American diplomat
- Sir George Henry Waller, 3rd Baronet (1837–1892), British Army officer
- George Waller Jr., author of books such as The Secret of Skull Mountain
- George D. Waller (1883–1969), American architect who designed Stone Hall, Nashville
