= 2017 First Data 500 =

Race details
- Race 33 of 36 in the 2017 Monster Energy NASCAR Cup Series
- Date: October 29, 2017
- Location: Martinsville Speedway in Ridgeway, Virginia
- Course: Permanent racing facility
- Course length: 0.526 miles (0.847 km)
- Distance: 505 laps, 265.63 mi (427.49 km)
- Scheduled distance: 500 laps, 263 mi (423.257 km)
- Average speed: 74.902 miles per hour (120.543 km/h)

Pole position
Driver	Joey Logano	Team Penske
- Time: 19.622

Most laps led
Driver	Kyle Busch	Joe Gibbs Racing
- Laps: 184

Winner
No. 18	Kyle Busch	Joe Gibbs Racing

Television in the United States
- Network: NBCSN
- Announcers: Rick Allen, Jeff Burton and Steve Letarte

Radio in the United States
- Radio: MRN
- Booth announcers: Joe Moore, Jeff Striegle and Rusty Wallace
- Turn announcers: Dave Moody (Backstretch)

The 2017 First Data 500 was a Monster Energy NASCAR Cup Series race held on October 29, 2017, at Martinsville Speedway in Ridgeway, Virginia. Contested over 505 laps – extended from 500 laps due to an overtime finish – on the 0.526-mile (0.847-kilometre) short track, it was the 33rd race of the 2017 Monster Energy NASCAR Cup Series season, seventh race of the playoffs, and first race of the Round of 8.

Leading 184 laps during the race, Joe Gibbs Racing driver Kyle Busch won his fifth race of the season – and his third during the playoffs – progressing to the Championship 4 as a result of the victory.

== Report ==
=== Background ===
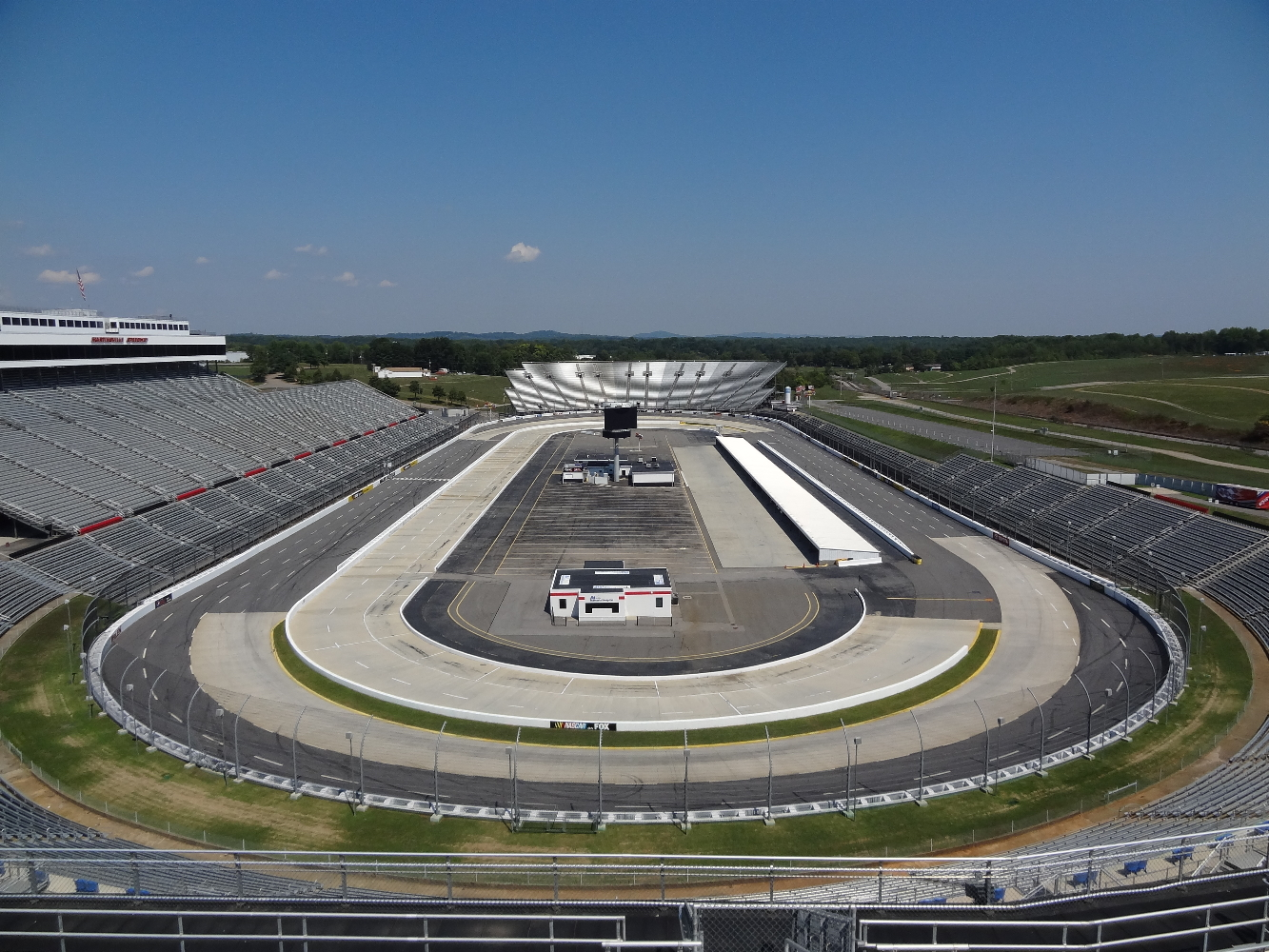
Martinsville Speedway, the track where the race was held.

Martinsville Speedway is an International Speedway Corporation owned NASCAR stock car racing track located in Henry County, in Ridgeway, Virginia, just to the south of Martinsville. At 0.526 miles (0.847 kilometres) in length, it is the shortest track in the NASCAR Cup Series. The track was also one of the first paved oval tracks in NASCAR, being built in 1947 by H. Clay Earles. It is also the only race track that has been on the NASCAR circuit from its beginning in 1948. Along with this, Martinsville is the only NASCAR oval track on the entire NASCAR track circuit to have asphalt surfaces on the straightaways, then concrete to cover the turns.

==== Entry list ====
No.	Driver	Team	Manufacturer
1	Jamie McMurray	Chip Ganassi Racing	Chevrolet
2	Brad Keselowski	Team Penske	Ford
3	Austin Dillon	Richard Childress Racing	Chevrolet
4	Kevin Harvick	Stewart–Haas Racing	Ford
5	Kasey Kahne	Hendrick Motorsports	Chevrolet
6	Trevor Bayne	Roush Fenway Racing	Ford
7	Hermie Sadler	Premium Motorsports	Chevrolet
10	Danica Patrick	Stewart–Haas Racing	Ford
11	Denny Hamlin	Joe Gibbs Racing	Toyota
13	Ty Dillon (R)	Germain Racing	Chevrolet
14	Clint Bowyer	Stewart–Haas Racing	Ford
15	Reed Sorenson	Premium Motorsports	Chevrolet
17	Ricky Stenhouse Jr.	Roush Fenway Racing	Ford
18	Kyle Busch	Joe Gibbs Racing	Toyota
19	Daniel Suárez (R)	Joe Gibbs Racing	Toyota
20	Matt Kenseth	Joe Gibbs Racing	Toyota
21	Ryan Blaney	Wood Brothers Racing	Ford
22	Joey Logano	Team Penske	Ford
23	Corey LaJoie (R)	BK Racing	Toyota
24	Chase Elliott	Hendrick Motorsports	Chevrolet
27	Paul Menard	Richard Childress Racing	Chevrolet
31	Ryan Newman	Richard Childress Racing	Chevrolet
32	Matt DiBenedetto	Go Fas Racing	Ford
33	Jeffrey Earnhardt	Circle Sport – The Motorsports Group	Chevrolet
34	Landon Cassill	Front Row Motorsports	Ford
37	Chris Buescher	JTG Daugherty Racing	Chevrolet
38	David Ragan	Front Row Motorsports	Ford
41	Kurt Busch	Stewart–Haas Racing	Ford
42	Kyle Larson	Chip Ganassi Racing	Chevrolet
43	Aric Almirola	Richard Petty Motorsports	Ford
47	A. J. Allmendinger	JTG Daugherty Racing	Chevrolet
48	Jimmie Johnson	Hendrick Motorsports	Chevrolet
51	Kyle Weatherman	Rick Ware Racing	Chevrolet
66	Carl Long (i)	MBM Motorsports	Chevrolet
72	Cole Whitt	TriStar Motorsports	Chevrolet
77	Erik Jones (R)	Furniture Row Racing	Toyota
78	Martin Truex Jr.	Furniture Row Racing	Toyota
83	Gray Gaulding (R)	BK Racing	Toyota
88	Dale Earnhardt Jr.	Hendrick Motorsports	Chevrolet
95	Michael McDowell	Leavine Family Racing	Chevrolet
Official entry list

== Practice ==
=== First practice ===
Denny Hamlin was the fastest in the first practice session with a time of 19.846 seconds and a speed of 95.415 mph (153.556 km/h).

Pos	No.	Driver	Team	Manufacturer	Time	Speed
1	11	Denny Hamlin	Joe Gibbs Racing	Toyota	19.846	95.415
2	42	Kyle Larson	Chip Ganassi Racing	Chevrolet	19.870	95.299
3	31	Ryan Newman	Richard Childress Racing	Chevrolet	19.900	95.156
Official first practice results

=== Final practice ===
Joey Logano was the fastest in the final practice session with a time of 20.056 seconds and a speed of 94.416 mph (151.948 km/h).

Pos	No.	Driver	Team	Manufacturer	Time	Speed
1	22	Joey Logano	Team Penske	Ford	20.056	94.416
2	24	Chase Elliott	Hendrick Motorsports	Chevrolet	20.075	94.326
3	78	Martin Truex Jr.	Furniture Row Racing	Toyota	20.083	94.289
Official final practice results

== Qualifying ==
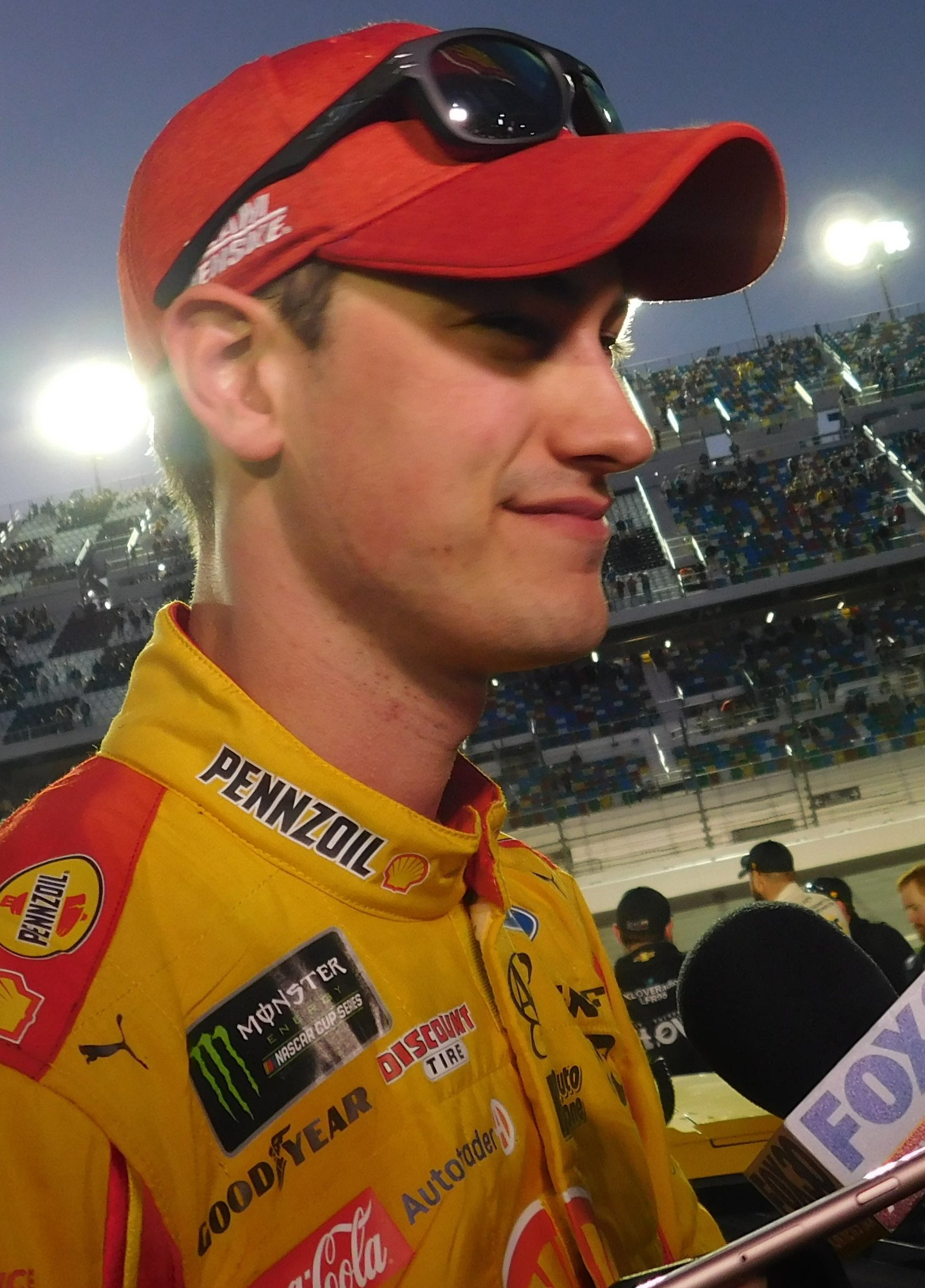
Joey Logano scored the pole position.

Joey Logano scored the pole for the race with a time of 19.622 and a speed of 96.504 mph (155.308 km/h).

=== Qualifying results ===
Pos	No.	Driver	Team	Manufacturer	R1	R2	R3
1	22	Joey Logano	Team Penske	Ford	19.631	19.571	19.622
2	78	Martin Truex Jr.	Furniture Row Racing	Toyota	19.725	19.696	19.627
3	24	Chase Elliott	Hendrick Motorsports	Chevrolet	19.742	19.685	19.636
4	21	Ryan Blaney	Wood Brothers Racing	Ford	19.718	19.705	19.700
5	14	Clint Bowyer	Stewart–Haas Racing	Ford	19.721	19.608	19.702
6	11	Denny Hamlin	Joe Gibbs Racing	Toyota	19.760	19.691	19.707
7	2	Brad Keselowski	Team Penske	Ford	19.695	19.696	19.712
8	77	Erik Jones (R)	Furniture Row Racing	Toyota	19.755	19.722	19.772
9	42	Kyle Larson	Chip Ganassi Racing	Chevrolet	19.694	19.685	19.786
10	43	Aric Almirola	Richard Petty Motorsports	Ford	19.658	19.716	19.820
11	41	Kurt Busch	Stewart–Haas Racing	Ford	19.757	19.661	19.844
12	5	Kasey Kahne	Hendrick Motorsports	Chevrolet	19.667	19.734	19.947
13	4	Kevin Harvick	Stewart–Haas Racing	Ford	19.734	19.736	
14	18	Kyle Busch	Joe Gibbs Racing	Toyota	19.709	19.739	
15	19	Daniel Suárez (R)	Joe Gibbs Racing	Toyota	19.708	19.746	
16	1	Jamie McMurray	Chip Ganassi Racing	Chevrolet	19.711	19.751	
17	20	Matt Kenseth	Joe Gibbs Racing	Toyota	19.660	19.767	
18	31	Ryan Newman	Richard Childress Racing	Chevrolet	19.711	19.791	
19	27	Paul Menard	Richard Childress Racing	Chevrolet	19.727	19.792	
20	95	Michael McDowell	Leavine Family Racing	Chevrolet	19.684	19.793	
21	88	Dale Earnhardt Jr.	Hendrick Motorsports	Chevrolet	19.715	19.795	
22	17	Ricky Stenhouse Jr.	Roush Fenway Racing	Ford	19.756	19.808	
23	10	Danica Patrick	Stewart–Haas Racing	Ford	19.728	19.833	
24	48	Jimmie Johnson	Hendrick Motorsports	Chevrolet	19.734	20.126	
25	3	Austin Dillon	Richard Childress Racing	Chevrolet	19.779		
26	13	Ty Dillon (R)	Germain Racing	Chevrolet	19.791		
27	47	A. J. Allmendinger	JTG Daugherty Racing	Chevrolet	19.792		
28	32	Matt DiBenedetto	Go Fas Racing	Ford	19.799		
29	37	Chris Buescher	JTG Daugherty Racing	Chevrolet	19.810		
30	72	Cole Whitt	TriStar Motorsports	Chevrolet	19.871		
31	38	David Ragan	Front Row Motorsports	Ford	19.880		
32	15	Reed Sorenson	Premium Motorsports	Chevrolet	19.885		
33	34	Landon Cassill	Front Row Motorsports	Ford	19.916		
34	6	Trevor Bayne	Roush Fenway Racing	Ford	19.921		
35	83	Gray Gaulding (R)	BK Racing	Toyota	19.971		
36	23	Corey LaJoie (R)	BK Racing	Toyota	19.987		
37	33	Jeffrey Earnhardt	Circle Sport – The Motorsports Group	Chevrolet	20.027		
38	51	Kyle Weatherman	Rick Ware Racing	Chevrolet	20.226		
39	66	Carl Long (i)	MBM Motorsports	Chevrolet	20.410		
40	7	Hermie Sadler	Premium Motorsports	Chevrolet	20.585		
Official qualifying results

- Jimmie Johnson started from the rear after changing tires on the car following qualifying.

== Race ==
=== Stage 1 ===
Joey Logano led the field to the green flag at 3:16 p.m., and he led the opening stint of the race until the first caution of the race on lap 37, when Ty Dillon, Ricky Stenhouse Jr. and Michael McDowell were involved in an accident at turn 2. This also served as a competition caution, which was initially planned for lap 45. The race restarted on lap 45 with Logano leading, but he was passed by his Team Penske teammate Brad Keselowski on lap 49. Keselowski maintained the lead through to the next caution period on lap 63, following a spin for David Ragan at turn 4. Keselowski kept the lead at the restart on lap 69, before being re-passed by Logano 10 laps later before another caution period followed on lap 87, due to contact between Danica Patrick and A. J. Allmendinger. Jimmie Johnson took the lead during the pit stop cycle, holding the lead until lap 114, when Keselowski returned to the lead, which he held to the end of the stage.

=== Stage 2 ===
Kyle Busch took the lead of the race during the pit stop cycle, going into the race's longest green flag run of 122 laps, which culminated in the end of the second stage. Busch led for 123 laps during the stage, but it was Keselowski that prevailed following contact between the two drivers.

=== Final stage ===
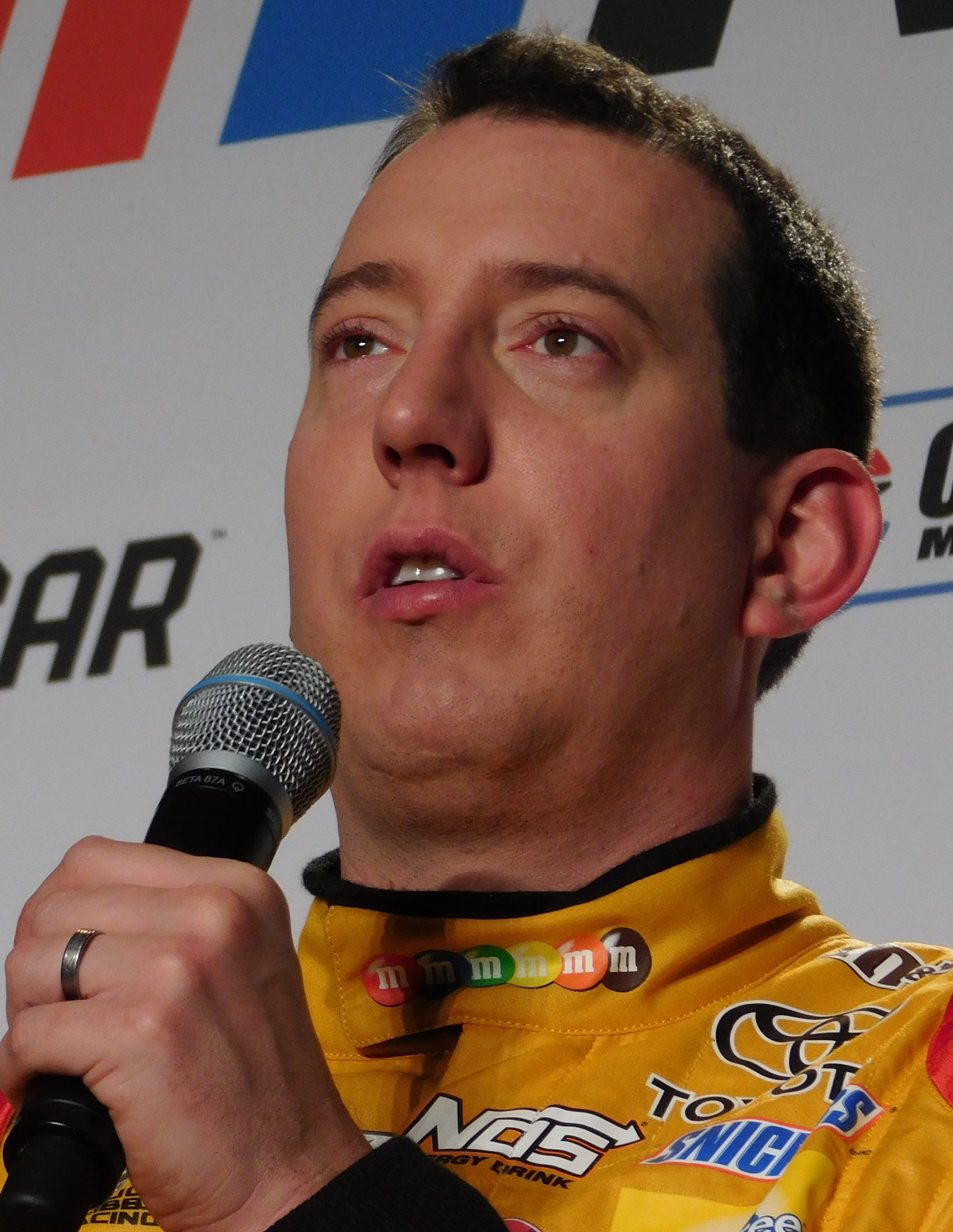
Kyle Busch won the race.

Just as he did between the first two stages, Busch took the race lead from Keselowski prior to the race restarting. Busch led the next stint of the race until the sixth caution period at lap 304, as Kyle Larson hit the wall on the backstretch and the resulting damage caused his retirement from the race. Busch kept the race lead at the restart on lap 314, but the race was back under neutralized conditions within 3 laps as Erik Jones spun out in turn 4. Busch led to the restart on lap 322, but he was passed shortly after by Chase Elliott; Elliott led the race up to the next caution period at lap 362, again caused by a spinning car in turn 4 – this time being Landon Cassill. Keselowski took the race lead during the resulting pit stop cycle, and from the restart on lap 368 until Elliott regained the lead on lap 386.

Elliott held the lead for the next portion of the race, up until the race's ninth caution period on lap 459, caused by an accident for Carl Long in turn 2. Busch and Elliott traded the lead during the pit stop cycle before Keselowski took the race lead from Elliott on lap 471. With eight laps to go, Logano spun out in the second turn as a result of a flat tire to cause the tenth caution of the race. At the restart with four laps to go, Keselowski started from the outside lane and was run up the track by Elliott to the inside in turn 3; behind, Denny Hamlin moved into second place, and on the following lap at turn 3, Hamlin spun Elliott around, with Elliott impacting the wall, causing another caution period and an overtime finish.

=== Overtime ===
Hamlin led the field to the restart with two laps to go, but Busch bumped his Joe Gibbs Racing teammate out of the way at the start of the final lap, and ultimately won the race to advance to the Championship 4 at Homestead–Miami Speedway. Hamlin ultimately finished the race in seventh place, as he was passed by Martin Truex Jr., Clint Bowyer, Keselowski, Kevin Harvick and Trevor Bayne. Numerous drivers were involved in a crash on the frontstretch as the race was finishing.

=== Race results ===
==== Stage results ====
Stage 1 Laps: 130

Pos	No	Driver	Team	Manufacturer	Points
1	2	Brad Keselowski	Team Penske	Ford	10
2	18	Kyle Busch	Joe Gibbs Racing	Toyota	9
3	22	Joey Logano	Team Penske	Ford	8
4	48	Jimmie Johnson	Hendrick Motorsports	Chevrolet	7
5	78	Martin Truex Jr.	Furniture Row Racing	Toyota	6
6	24	Chase Elliott	Hendrick Motorsports	Chevrolet	5
7	21	Ryan Blaney	Wood Brothers Racing	Ford	4
8	5	Kasey Kahne	Hendrick Motorsports	Chevrolet	3
9	3	Austin Dillon	Richard Childress Racing	Chevrolet	2
10	11	Denny Hamlin	Joe Gibbs Racing	Toyota	1
Official stage one results

Stage 2 Laps: 130

Pos	No	Driver	Team	Manufacturer	Points
1	2	Brad Keselowski	Team Penske	Ford	10
2	18	Kyle Busch	Joe Gibbs Racing	Toyota	9
3	22	Joey Logano	Team Penske	Ford	8
4	78	Martin Truex Jr.	Furniture Row Racing	Toyota	7
5	24	Chase Elliott	Hendrick Motorsports	Chevrolet	6
6	21	Ryan Blaney	Wood Brothers Racing	Ford	5
7	4	Kevin Harvick	Stewart–Haas Racing	Ford	4
8	20	Matt Kenseth	Joe Gibbs Racing	Toyota	3
9	14	Clint Bowyer	Stewart–Haas Racing	Ford	2
10	48	Jimmie Johnson	Hendrick Motorsports	Chevrolet	1
Official stage two results

=== Final stage results ===
Stage 3 Laps: 240

Pos	Grid	No	Driver	Team	Manufacturer	Laps	Points
1	14	18	Kyle Busch	Joe Gibbs Racing	Toyota	505	58
2	2	78	Martin Truex Jr.	Furniture Row Racing	Toyota	505	48
3	5	14	Clint Bowyer	Stewart–Haas Racing	Ford	505	36
4	7	2	Brad Keselowski	Team Penske	Ford	505	53
5	13	4	Kevin Harvick	Stewart–Haas Racing	Ford	505	36
6	34	6	Trevor Bayne	Roush Fenway Racing	Ford	505	31
7	6	11	Denny Hamlin	Joe Gibbs Racing	Toyota	505	31
8	4	21	Ryan Blaney	Wood Brothers Racing	Ford	505	38
9	17	20	Matt Kenseth	Joe Gibbs Racing	Toyota	505	31
10	22	17	Ricky Stenhouse Jr.	Roush Fenway Racing	Ford	505	27
11	21	88	Dale Earnhardt Jr.	Hendrick Motorsports	Chevrolet	505	26
12	24	48	Jimmie Johnson	Hendrick Motorsports	Chevrolet	505	33
13	25	3	Austin Dillon	Richard Childress Racing	Chevrolet	505	26
14	18	31	Ryan Newman	Richard Childress Racing	Chevrolet	505	23
15	15	19	Daniel Suárez (R)	Joe Gibbs Racing	Toyota	505	22
16	12	5	Kasey Kahne	Hendrick Motorsports	Chevrolet	505	24
17	23	10	Danica Patrick	Stewart–Haas Racing	Ford	505	20
18	10	43	Aric Almirola	Richard Petty Motorsports	Ford	505	19
19	20	95	Michael McDowell	Leavine Family Racing	Chevrolet	505	18
20	19	27	Paul Menard	Richard Childress Racing	Chevrolet	505	17
21	29	37	Chris Buescher	JTG Daugherty Racing	Chevrolet	505	16
22	11	41	Kurt Busch	Stewart–Haas Racing	Ford	505	15
23	33	34	Landon Cassill	Front Row Motorsports	Ford	505	14
24	1	22	Joey Logano	Team Penske	Ford	504	29
25	30	72	Cole Whitt	TriStar Motorsports	Chevrolet	504	12
26	8	77	Erik Jones (R)	Furniture Row Racing	Toyota	504	11
27	3	24	Chase Elliott	Hendrick Motorsports	Chevrolet	504	21
28	31	38	David Ragan	Front Row Motorsports	Ford	503	9
29	16	1	Jamie McMurray	Chip Ganassi Racing	Chevrolet	503	8
30	26	13	Ty Dillon (R)	Germain Racing	Chevrolet	501	7
31	35	83	Gray Gaulding (R)	BK Racing	Toyota	501	6
32	32	15	Reed Sorenson	Premium Motorsports	Chevrolet	500	5
33	36	23	Corey LaJoie (R)	BK Racing	Toyota	500	4
34	40	7	Hermie Sadler	Premium Motorsports	Chevrolet	494	3
35	38	51	Kyle Weatherman	Rick Ware Racing	Chevrolet	488	2
36	39	66	Carl Long (i)	MBM Motorsports	Chevrolet	444	0
37	9	42	Kyle Larson	Chip Ganassi Racing	Chevrolet	300	1
38	37	33	Jeffrey Earnhardt (R)	Circle Sport – The Motorsports Group	Chevrolet	274	1
39	28	32	Matt DiBenedetto	Go Fas Racing	Ford	187	1
40	27	47	A. J. Allmendinger	JTG Daugherty Racing	Chevrolet	94	1
Official race results

=== Race statistics ===
- Lead changes: 16 among 6 different drivers
- Cautions/Laps: 11 for 74 laps
- Red flags: 0
- Time of race: 3 hours, 32 minutes, 47 seconds
- Average speed: 74.902 miles per hour (120.543 km/h)

== Media ==
=== Television ===
NBC Sports covered the race on the television side. Rick Allen, Jeff Burton and Steve Letarte had the call in the broadcast booth, while Dave Burns, Marty Snider and Kelli Stavast reported from pit lane.

NBCSN
Booth announcers	Pit reporters
Lap-by-lap: Rick Allen; Color commentator: Jeff Burton; Color commentator: Steve Letarte	Dave Burns; Marty Snider; Kelli Stavast

=== Radio ===
MRN covered the radio call for the race, which was simulcast on SiriusXM's NASCAR Radio channel.

MRN
Booth announcers	Turn announcers	Pit reporters
Lead announcer: Joe Moore; Announcer: Jeff Striegle; Announcer: Rusty Wallace	Backstretch: Dave Moody	Alex Hayden; Winston Kelley; Steve Post

== Standings after the race ==
Drivers' Championship standings

	Pos	Driver	Points
	1	Martin Truex Jr.	4,117
	2	Kyle Busch	4,100 (–17)
	3	Brad Keselowski	4,079 (–38)
	4	Kevin Harvick	4,053 (–64)
	5	Jimmie Johnson	4,050 (–67)
1	6	Ryan Blaney	4,047 (–70)
1	7	Denny Hamlin	4,045 (–72)
	8	Chase Elliott	4,027 (–90)
	9	Kyle Larson	2,237 (–1,880)
	10	Matt Kenseth	2,215 (–1,902)
1	11	Kasey Kahne	2,150 (–1,967)
2	12	Austin Dillon	2,148 (–1,969)
2	13	Ricky Stenhouse Jr.	2,146 (–1,971)
3	14	Jamie McMurray	2,146 (–1,971)
2	15	Kurt Busch	2,139 (–1,978)
	16	Ryan Newman	2,130 (–1,987)
Official driver's standings

Manufacturers' Championship standings

	Pos	Manufacturer	Points
	1	Toyota	1,177
1	2	Ford	1,150 (–27)
1	3	Chevrolet	1,149 (–28)
Official manufacturers' standings

- Note: Only the first 16 positions are included for the driver standings.

Previous race: 2017 Hollywood Casino 400	Monster Energy NASCAR Cup Series; 2017 season	Next race: 2017 AAA Texas 500
