= Martinsville Fish Dam =

- U.S. National Register of Historic Places
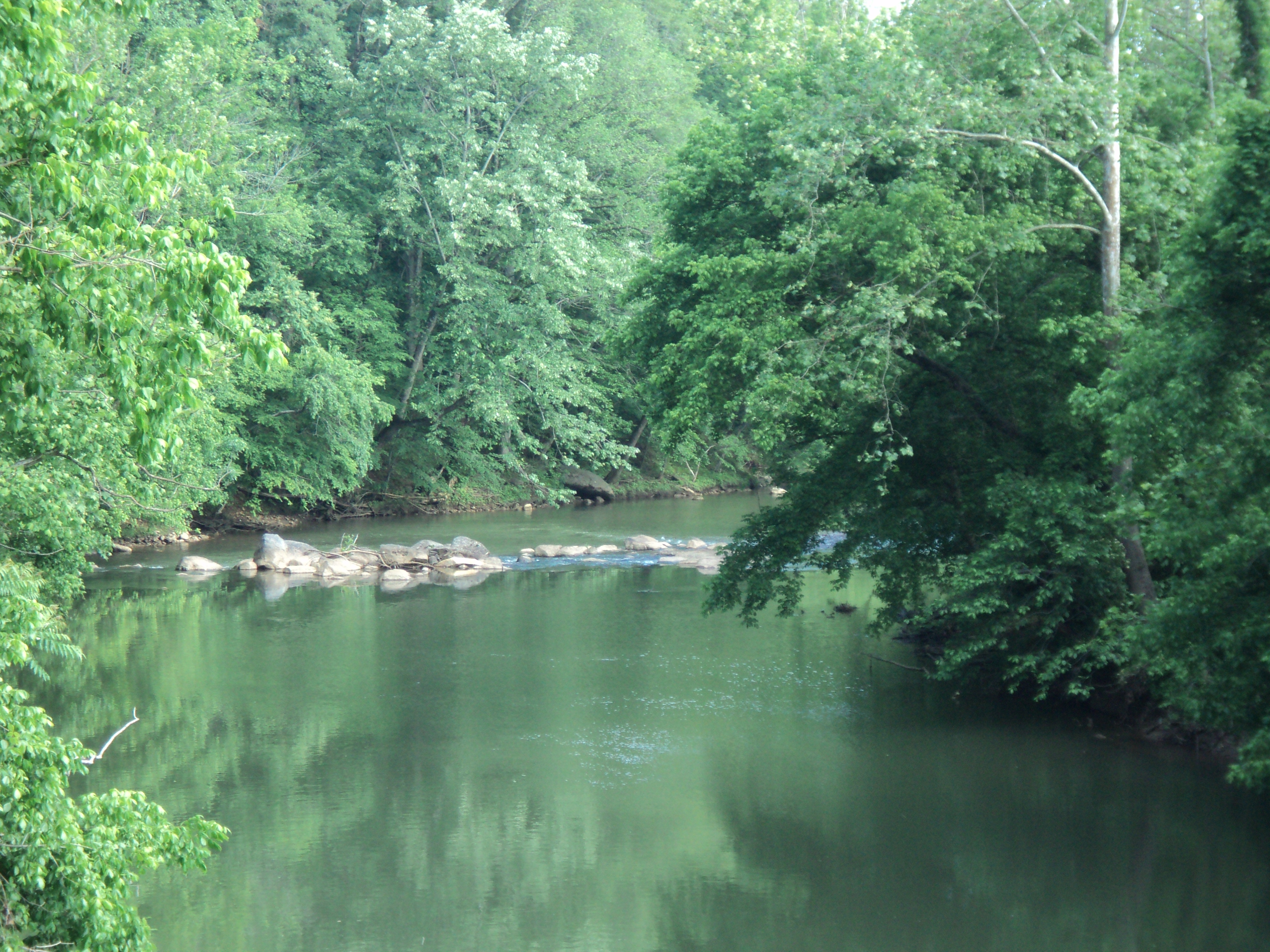

- Location within Virginia Location within the United States
- Nearest city: Martinsville, Virginia
- Coordinates: 36°39′10.29″N 79°52′17.56″W
- Area: 1.5 acres (0.61 ha)
- NRHP reference No.: 74002128
- Added to NRHP: January 21, 1974

The Martinsville Fish Dam is a Native American weir in the Smith River near Martinsville, Virginia. The weir is a rough wall of piled rocks in a V shape with the point of the V downstream. At an opening in that point a basket could be used to catch fish that were funneled to that point by the walls of the weir.

The dam was listed on the National Register of Historic Places in 1974.

== See also ==
- National Register of Historic Places listings in Henry County, Virginia
