= Rock Run School =

Historic schoolhouse in Virginia, US

- U.S. National Register of Historic Places
- Virginia Landmarks Register
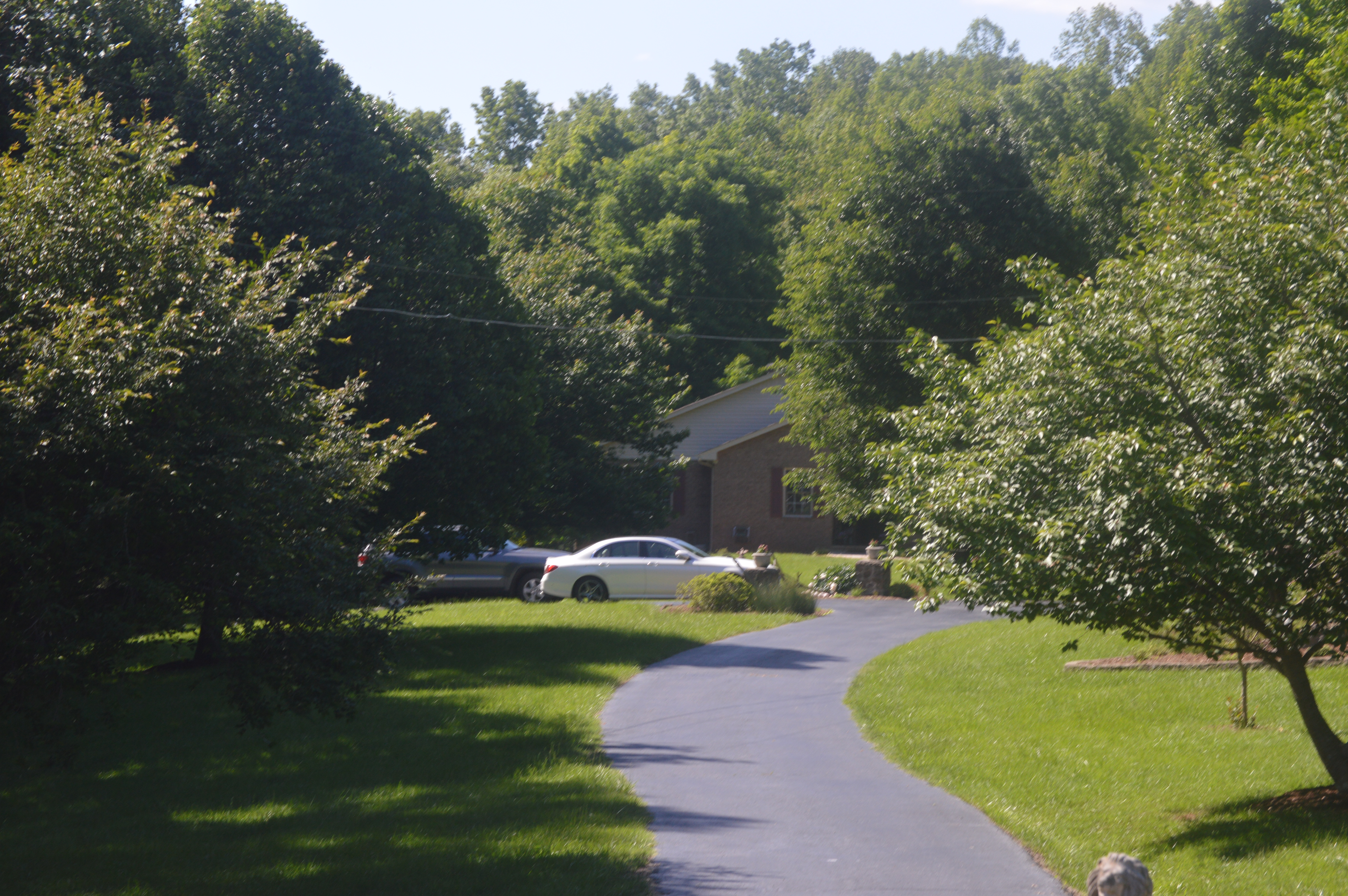
- Looking toward the school from the south

- Location within Virginia Location within the United States
- Nearest city: Fieldale, Virginia
- Coordinates: 36°43′5″N 79°58′49″W
- Built: 1880
- NRHP reference No.: 05001268
- VLR No.: 044-5171

Significant dates
- Added to NRHP: November 16, 2005
- Designated VLR: September 14, 2005

Rock Run School is a historic one-room school house built in the late 19th century in Henry County, Virginia. Today it is regarded as offering a strong insight into the state of black education in the years between the U.S. Civil War and Brown vs. Board of Education. This school soon added another room, and operated as an educational institution until the mid-1950s, when it was consolidated into a larger segregated school. Similar to most other black schools, Rock Run School was painfully underfunded throughout its history, stunting the development and materials available to the school.

== Historic significance ==
The application of the registry gives this summation: "The Rock Run School served the African American community of Rock Run in rural Henry County, Virginia from the post-Civil War Reconstruction Period of the early 1880s through the mid-20th century. It is a highly significant vestige of the educational history of Southside Virginia, the rural south, and the black population of late 19th-mid-20th century Henry County. Although in overall poor condition, the school has not been altered over the years or damaged in any substantial way. As such, its historic integrity is remarkable, and its potential for restoration appears promising. It is a rare and irreplaceable surviving example of an educational institution that served African Americans, because it represents several phases in the evolution of African American education in Virginia."

"Frank Agnew, a student at Rock Run School in the 1940s, restored the school with funds from the Harvest Foundation."

Unlike most log rural schoolhouses of the time, the Rock Run School was constructed as a frame building. Although the means of construction Rock Run are unknown, it is most likely that the parents and students themselves helped build the school, contributing supplies and labor because of the lack of government funding.
