= Ingleside (Ridgeway, Virginia) =

Historic house in Virginia, United States

- U.S. National Register of Historic Places
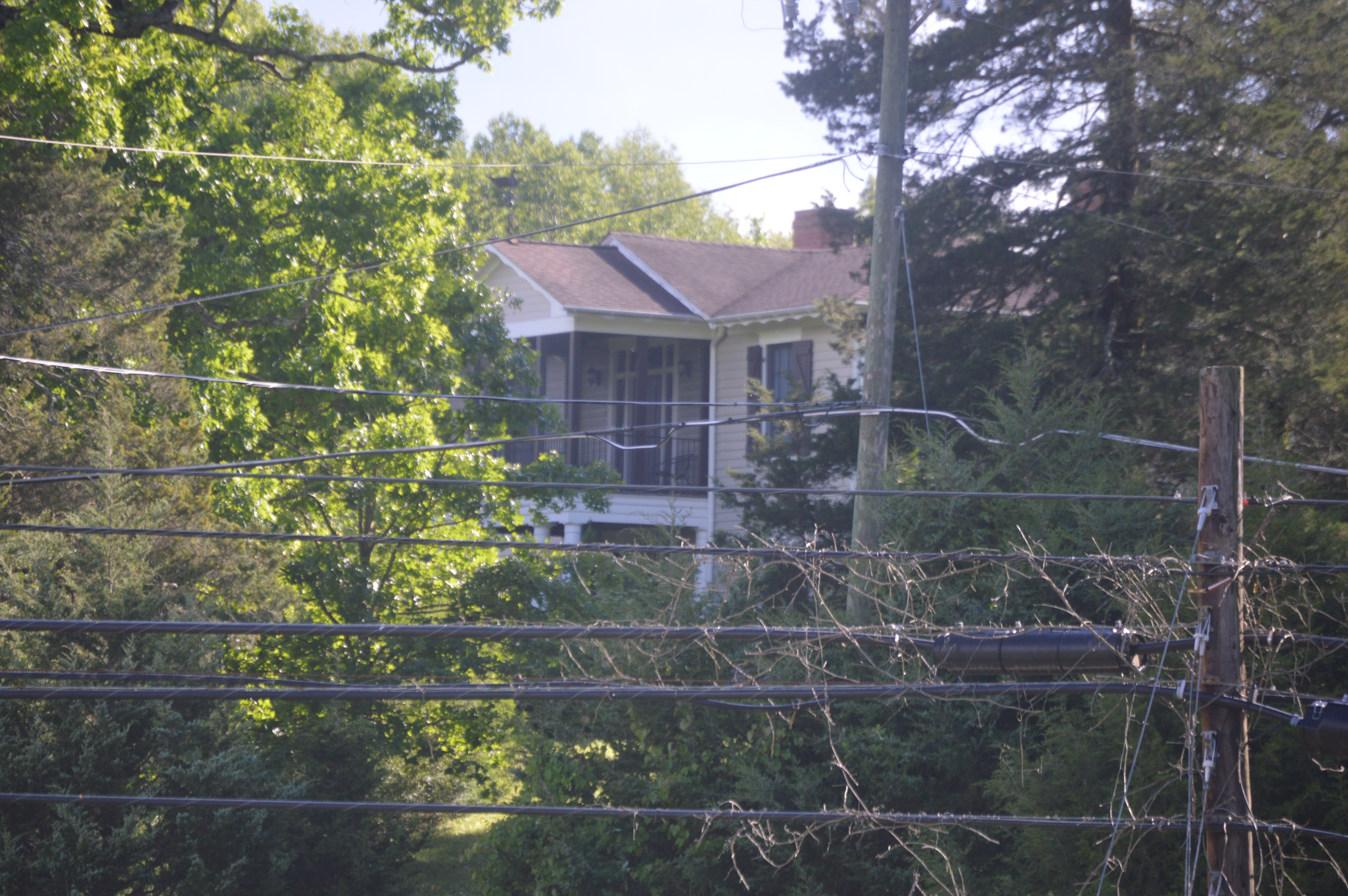

- Location within Virginia Location within the United States
- Location: 500 Mica Rd., Henry County, Virginia
- Nearest city: Ridgeway, Virginia
- Coordinates: 36°35′47″N 79°51′24″W
- Area: 5 acres (2.0 ha)
- Built: 1880
- Architectural style: Late Gothic Revival
- NRHP reference No.: 99000963
- Added to NRHP: August 5, 1999

Ingleside is a historic house at 500 Mica Road in Henry County, Virginia, north of Ridgeway. It is a two-story wood-frame house with a combination of Greek and Gothic Revival features. It has an approximately square shape, with three bays divided by vertical boards that resemble pilasters. Its gables are adorned with Gothic scalloped vergeboard. Its interiors include distinctive, painted finishes and a fireplace mantel colored to resemble gold-veined black marble. The house is believed to have started construction in the 1870s and completed in 1880 by the Penn family, who were recorded as the landowners in the late 1870s.

The house was listed on the National Register of Historic Places in 1999.

== See also ==
- National Register of Historic Places listings in Henry County, Virginia
