= Attorney General Henry =

Attorney General Henry may refer to:

- Denis Henry (1864–1925), Attorney-General for Ireland
- Robert Harlan Henry (born 1953), Attorney General of Oklahoma
- William Alexander Henry (1816–1888), Attorney General of Nova Scotia

== See also ==
- General Henry (disambiguation)
