= Aurora (Spencer, Virginia) =

Historic house in Virginia, United States

- U.S. National Register of Historic Places
- Virginia Landmarks Register
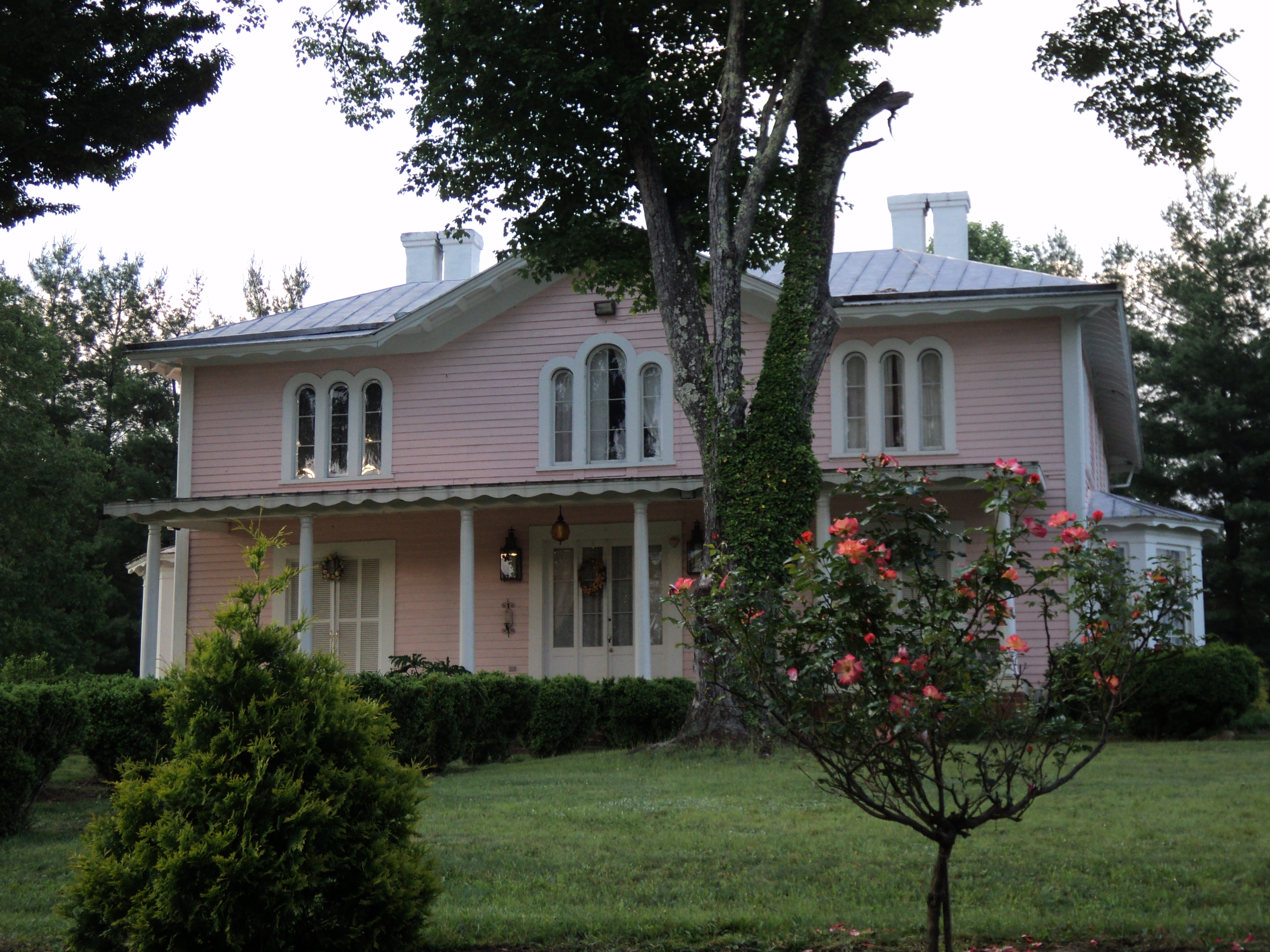
- Aurora, May 2010

- Location within Virginia Location within the United States
- Location: VA 629 S of jct. with US 58, near Spencer, Virginia
- Coordinates: 36°36′3″N 80°3′11″W
- Area: 5.6 acres (2.3 ha)
- Built: 1853-1856
- Architectural style: Italianate, Italian Villa
- NRHP reference No.: 91000015
- VLR No.: 070-0011

Significant dates
- Added to NRHP: February 4, 1991
- Designated VLR: August 21, 1990

Aurora, also known as the Pink House, Boxwood, and the Penn Homestead, is a historic home located at Penn's Store near Spencer, Patrick County, Virginia. It was built between 1853 and 1856, and is a two-story, three-bay, hipped-roof frame house in the Italian Villa style. It features one-story porches on the east and west facades, round-arched windows, clustered chimneys, and low pitched roofs. Also on the property is a contributing small one-story frame building once used as an office. It was built by Thomas Jefferson Penn (1810-1888), whose son, Frank Reid Penn founded the company F.R & G. Penn Co. that was eventually acquired by tobacco magnate James Duke to form the American Tobacco Company.

It was listed on the National Register of Historic Places in 2009.
