= Spencer–Penn School =

Historic school complex in Virginia, US

- Spencer-Penn School
- U.S. National Register of Historic Places
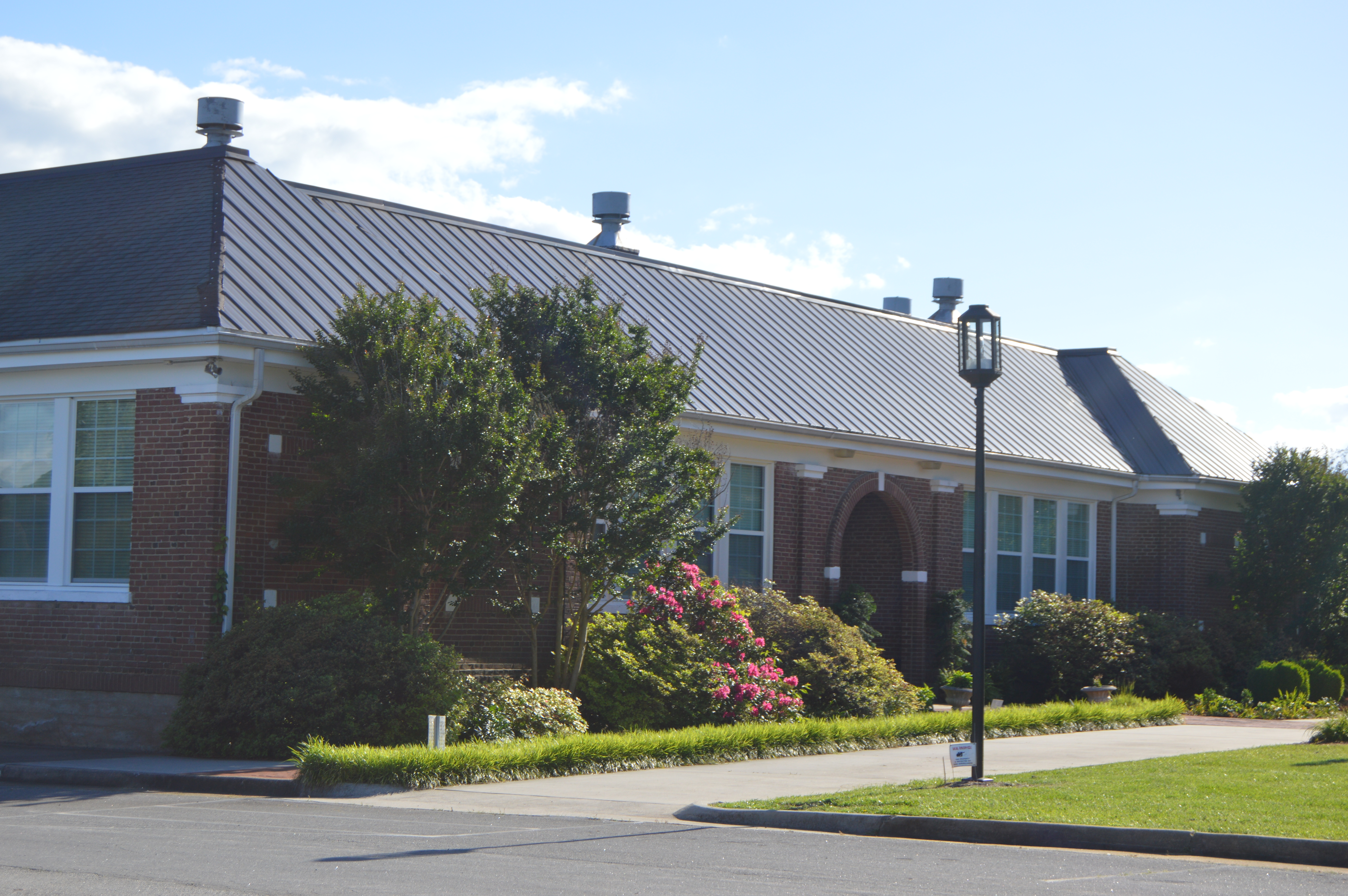

- Location within Virginia Location within the United States
- Location: 30 George Taylor Rd., Spencer, Virginia
- Coordinates: 36°37′0″N 80°0′50″W
- Area: 8 acres (3.2 ha)
- Built: 1926
- Architectural style: Colonial Revival
- NRHP reference No.: 05000482
- Added to NRHP: May 26, 2005

The Spencer–Penn School is a historic school complex at 30 George Taylor Road in Spencer, Virginia. Its main building, a large brick Colonial Revival building, was built in 1926–27, and is the only surviving non-residential building in the community to be built before World War II. The campus also includes the school's first building, a frame structure built in 1911. The school served the area until 2004, when it was closed by the county school board. The campus is now home to the Spencer–Penn Centre, a non-profit education and special event center.

The property was listed on the National Register of Historic Places in 2005.

== See also ==
- National Register of Historic Places listings in Henry County, Virginia
