= Grassdale Farm =

Historic house in Virginia, United States

- U.S. National Register of Historic Places
- Virginia Landmarks Register
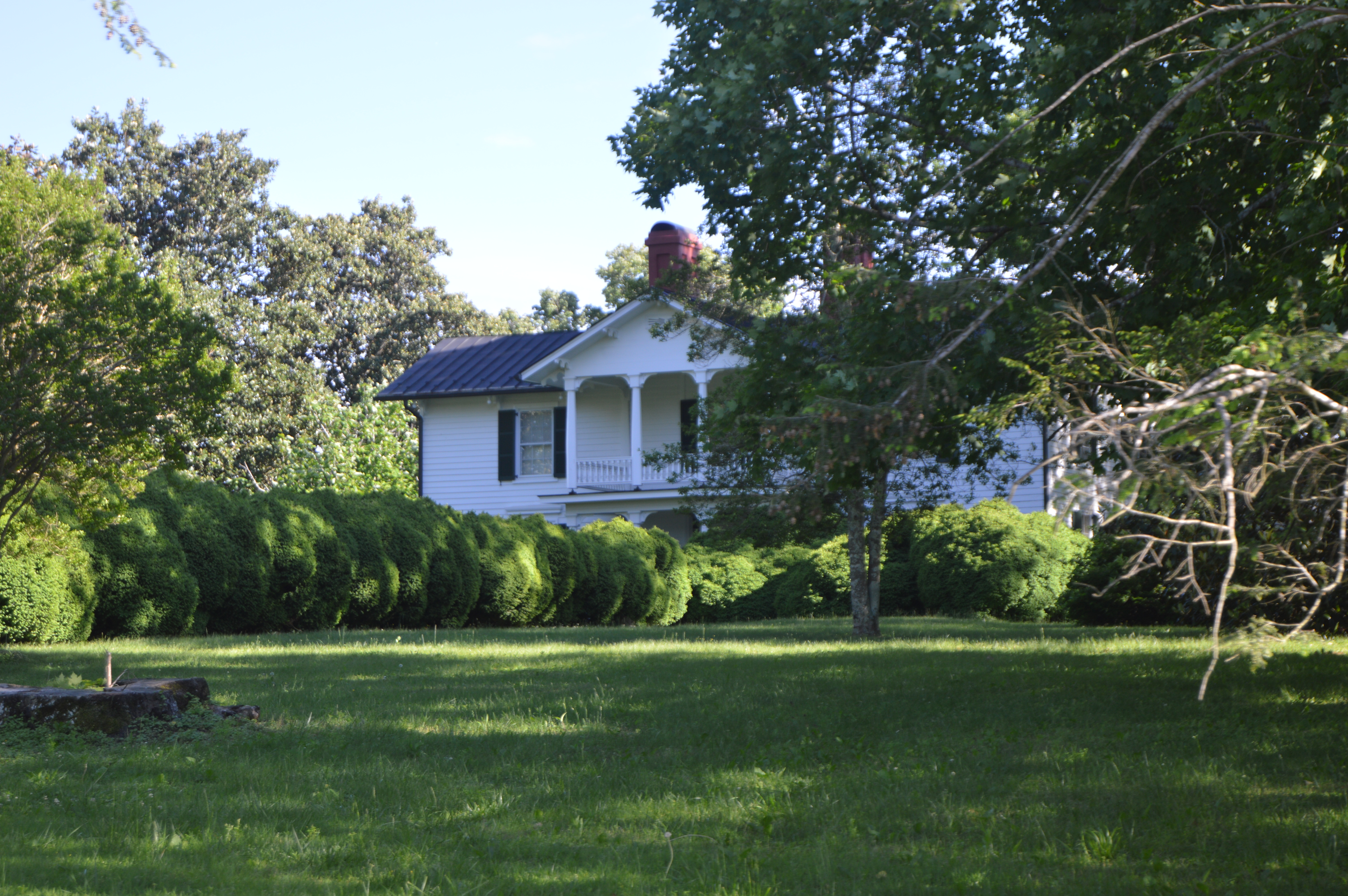
- Roadside view

- Location within Virginia Location within the United States
- Location: 187 Spencer Penn Rd., Spencer, Virginia
- Coordinates: 36°36′58″N 80°00′37″W
- Area: 90 acres (36 ha)
- Built: c. 1860
- Built by: Stanley Bowles, Mr. Taylor
- Architectural style: Greek Revival, Italianate
- NRHP reference No.: 02000587
- VLR No.: 044-0010

Significant dates
- Added to NRHP: May 30, 2002
- Designated VLR: March 13, 2002

Grassdale Farm is a historic home located at Spencer, Henry County, Virginia. It was built about 1860, and is a two-story, center-passage-plan frame dwelling with Greek Revival and Greek Revival style influences. Two-story ells have been added to the rear of the main section, creating an overall "U" form. Also on the property are a variety of contributing buildings and outbuildings including a kitchen, smokehouse, cook's house, log dwelling, and office / caretaker's house dated to the 19th century; and a garage, playhouse, poultry house, two barns, greenhouse, Mack Watkin's House, granary and corn crib, and Spencer Store and Post Office dated to the 1940s-1950s. Grassdale Farm was once owned by Thomas Jefferson Penn, who built Chinqua-Penn Plantation outside Reidsville, North Carolina, where the Penn tobacco-manufacturing interests were located.

It was listed on the National Register of Historic Places in 2002.
