= Old Turner Place =

Historic house in Virginia, United States

- U.S. National Register of Historic Places
- Virginia Landmarks Register
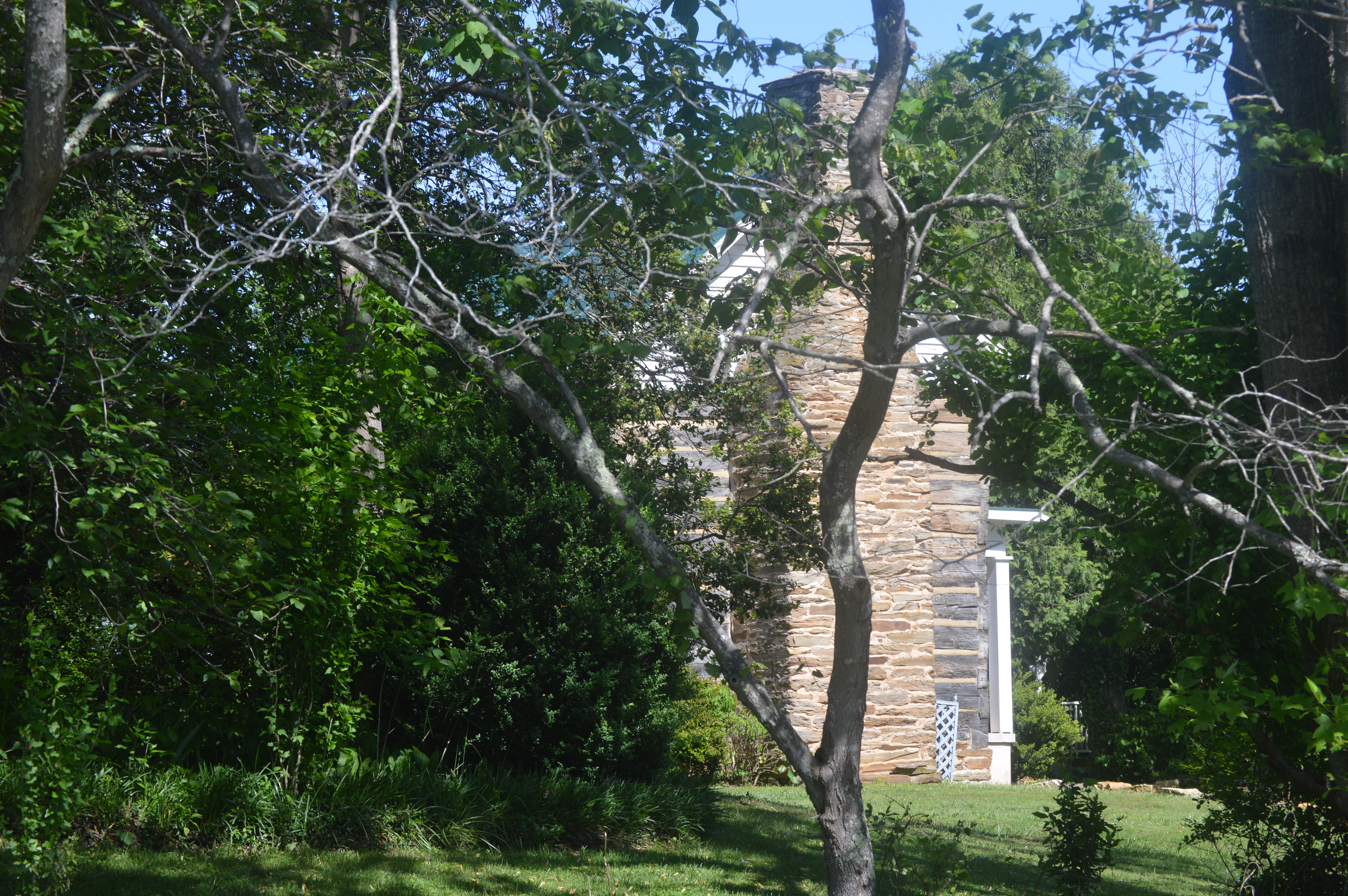
- Roadside view; little more than the chimney can be seen

- Location within Virginia Location within the United States
- Location: 7643 Henry Rd., near Henry, Virginia
- Coordinates: 36°49′43″N 79°59′56″W
- Area: 19.1 acres (7.7 ha)
- Built: c. 1804
- Architectural style: Log
- NRHP reference No.: 02001371
- VLR No.: 044-0105

Significant dates
- Added to NRHP: November 21, 2002
- Designated VLR: September 11, 2002

Old Turner Place, also known as King's Grant One, is a historic home located near Henry, Henry County, Virginia. It was built about 1804, and is a 1 1/2-story, log dwelling with a gable roof and massive gable end chimneys. Also on the property is a contributing smokehouse.

It was listed on the National Register of Historic Places in 2002.
