= John B. Henry Jr. =

United States Air Force general

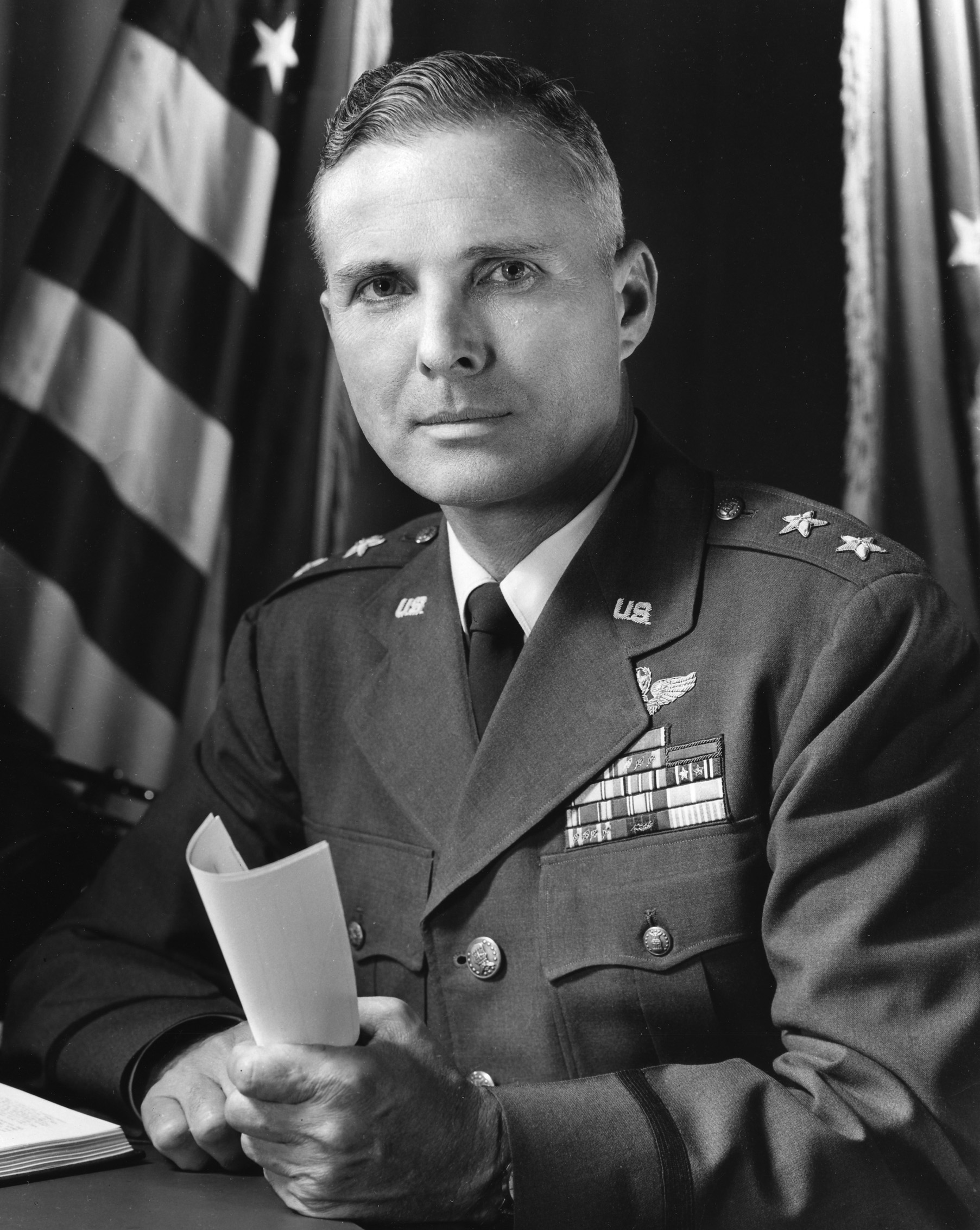
- Born: 15 July 1916; Christine, Texas
- Died: 2 September 2013 (aged 97)
- Burial place: Sunset Memorial Park, San Antonio, Texas
- Military career
- Allegiance: United States
- Branch: United States Army (1939–1947); United States Air Force (1947–1974)
- Service years: 1939–1974
- Rank: Major General
- Commands: 28th Fighter Squadron; 339th Fighter Group; 28th Bombardment Group; 22nd Bombardment Wing
- Conflicts: World War II
- Awards: Legion of Merit (5); Distinguished Flying Cross; Air Medal (8); Croix de Guerre 1939–1945 (France); Air Force Military Cross, 2nd Class (Venezuela)

John Bailey Henry Jr. (15 July 1916 – 2 September 2013) was a major general in the United States Air Force (USAF). He began his military in 1938 when he joined the United States Army Air Corps, completing his pilot training the following year. He served in a fighter squadron based in Panama before World War II, before flying 94 combat missions in Europe. He also commanded a fighter group and served as a staff officer within a bombardment wing. After the war, he undertook a number of staff officer roles and administrative positions in the USAF and studied at the Air War College. His final posting was chief of staff of the United States Southern Command in Panama. He retired in 1974. He died on 2 September 2013 at the age of 97.

== Early life ==
John Bailey Henry Jr. was born in Christine, Texas, on 15 July 1916, the son of John Bailey and Esther Belle Henry. He attended Charlotte High School, and entered Southwestern University in 1936. After completing the required two years of study, he joined the US Army as an aviation cadet in March 1938. Upon graduation in February 1939, he received his pilot wings and a commission as a second lieutenant in the United States Army Air Corps.

== World War II ==
Henry became operations officer of the 37th Fighter Group, and then commander of the 28th Fighter Squadron at Albrook Field on the Panama Canal Zone. There he met Maxine Schoeffler, a New York woman living there with her father, who was also stationed in the Panama Canal Zone, on a blind date. They married two years later. They had a daughter, Anne, and a son, John B. Henry III. In July 1943 Henry assumed command of the 339th Fighter Group at Rice Field, California.

The 339th Fighter Group moved to England in March 1944, where it joined the Eighth Air Force, and was re-equipped with the P-51 Mustang. In April 1945 he became the assistant chief of staff A-3 (operations) of the 4th Bombardment Wing. He subsequently became chief of staff of the 20th Bombardment Wing, which returned to the United States in August 1945. He flew a total of 94 combat missions.

== Postwar ==
After the war ended, Henry commanded air bases in Dallas, Texas, and Topeka, Kansas, and Westover Field, Massachusetts. In September 1947 he entered the Armed Forces Staff College in Norfolk, Virginia. After graduation in February 1948, he commanded the 28th Bombardment Group at Rapid City Air Force Base, South Dakota. He served on the staff of the Fifteenth Air Force at Ent Air Force Base in Colorado as its deputy chief of staff for personnel and administration, and then at March Air Force Base in California as its deputy chief of staff for operations. In March 1952 he assumed command of the 22nd Bombardment Wing there.

In July 1954 Henry entered the Air War College at Maxwell Air Force Base, Alabama. After graduating the following year, he became chief of the Promotions and Separations Division at United States Air Force (USAF) headquarters at The Pentagon. He became head of the Office of Deputy Chief of Staff for Personnel in June 1958. He was posted to the headquarters of the Pacific Air Forces at Hickam Air Force Base in Hawaii as director of the secretariat, then assistant chief of staff for plans, and finally as assistant chief of staff for operations.

Henry returned to USAF headquarters in August 1963 as deputy inspector general, and in August 1966 as director of the Secretary of the Air Force's Personnel Council. In September 1967 he became director of the Inter-American Defense College at Fort McNair in Washington, DC. His final posting, in July 1969, took him back to where his career had begun, as chief of staff of the United States Southern Command at Quarry Heights in the Panama Canal Zone. He retired on 1 August 1974.

== Later life and honors and awards ==
Henry died on 2 September 2013 and was interred in Sunset Memorial Park in San Antonio, Texas. His military decorations included the Legion of Merit with four oak leaf clusters, the Distinguished Flying Cross, the Air Medal with seven oak leaf clusters, the French Croix de Guerre 1939–1945, and the Air Force Military Cross, 2nd Class from Venezuela.
