= Virginia Home =

Historic house in Virginia, United States

- U.S. National Register of Historic Places
- U.S. Historic district – Contributing property
- Virginia Landmarks Register
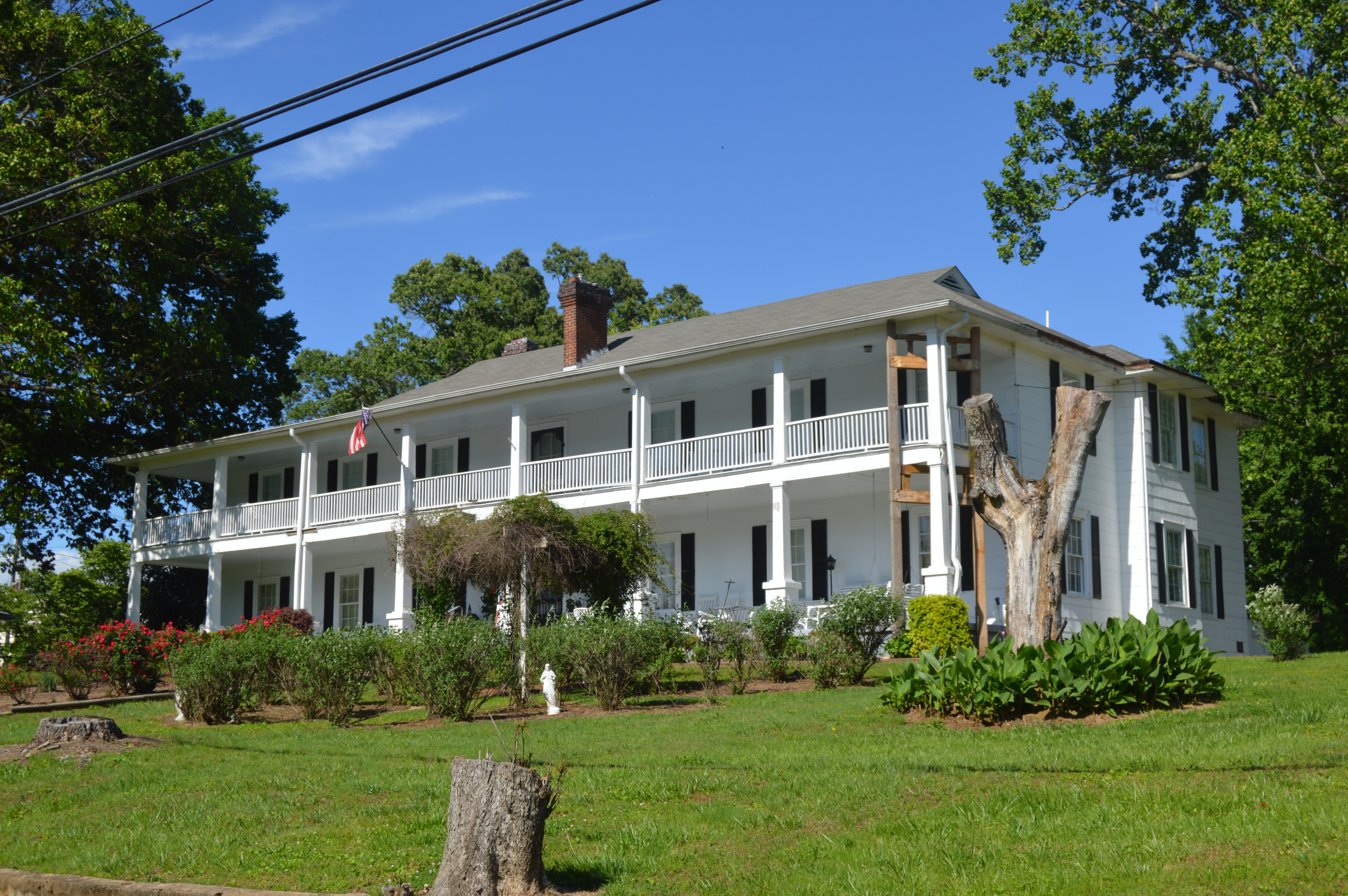
- Front and southern end

- Location within Virginia Location within the United States
- Location: 986 Field Ave., Fieldale, Virginia
- Coordinates: 36°42′19″N 79°56′24″W
- Area: 0.7 acres (0.28 ha)
- Built: 1920
- Built by: John Smith
- NRHP reference No.: 00000495
- VLR No.: 044-5010

Significant dates
- Added to NRHP: May 24, 2000
- Designated VLR: March 15, 2000

Virginia Home is a historic boarding house located at Fieldale, Henry County, Virginia, United States. It was built in 1920, and is a two-story, seven-bay, frame structure with a hipped roof and a full, two-story porch. Also on the property are a contributing cook's house, a wash house, and a one-story cottage for the staff of the Virginia Home. The Virginia Home was built by Marshall Field and Company as a boarding house for workers at the Fieldcrest Mills.

It was listed on the National Register of Historic Places in 2000. It is located in the Fieldale Historic District.
