= Chinqua Penn Plantation =

Historic house in North Carolina, United States

- Chinqua-Penn Plantation
- U.S. National Register of Historic Places
- U.S. Historic district
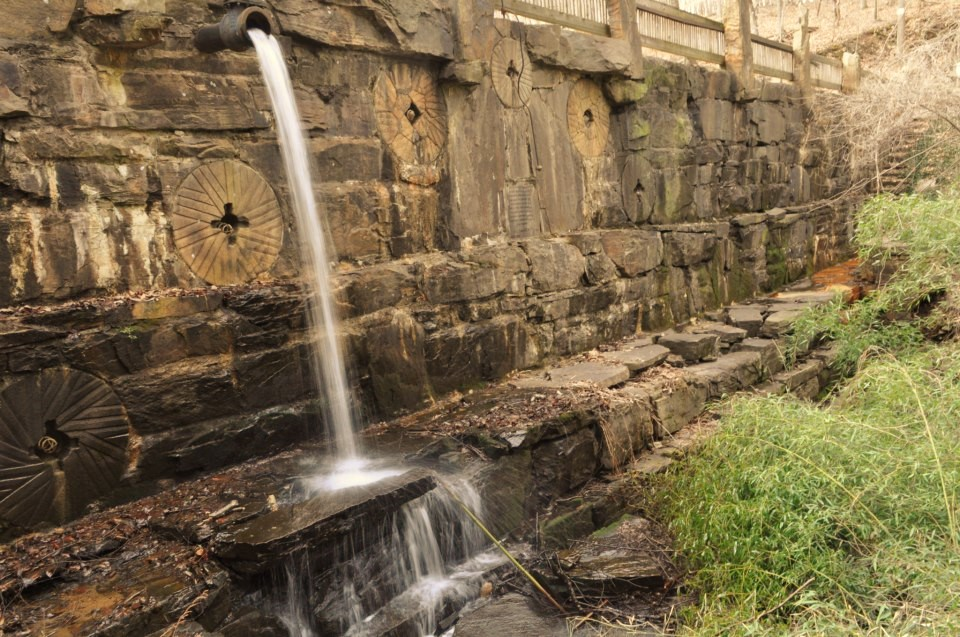

- Location within North Carolina Location within the United States
- Location: NC 1998 N side, 0.2 miles W of jct. with NC 1987, near Reidsville, North Carolina
- Coordinates: 36°23′4″N 79°42′0″W
- Area: 22.8 acres (9.2 ha)
- Built: 1923
- Architect: Ingalls, Harry C.; Et al.
- Architectural style: Eclectic
- NRHP reference No.: 93000235
- Added to NRHP: April 8, 1993

Chinqua Penn Plantation is an English manor home in Reidsville, North Carolina in Rockingham County, North Carolina, United States, (about 25 miles north of Greensboro). It is a private residence and was closed to the public in 2012. The home was built by Thomas Jefferson Penn ("Jeff", 1875–1946) and Margaret Beatrice Shoellkopf Penn ("Betsy", 1881–1965) in the 1920s. The name "Chinqua Penn" was derived from the chinquapin, a species of American chestnut that was once plentiful in the area.

Chinqua Penn Plantation ranks high among North Carolina's finest well-preserved early 20th century homes, including Reynolda House, and Duke Mansion.

== History ==
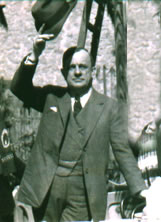
Thomas Jefferson 'Jeff' Penn (1875–1946)

After inheriting a portion of the Penn family tobacco interests, they relocated from Penn's Store, Patrick County, Virginia to North Carolina; Jeff Penn then augmented his fortune in stocks and bonds during the depression. He also operated a dairy husbandry and raised Holstein cattle. In later years he raised Black Angus. The Penn Tobacco Company was later purchased in 1911 by American Tobacco Company, the Duke family behemoth that made Lucky Strike cigarettes. The coats-of-arms above the picture window show the Penn family crest, as well as that of the Spencer family of Spencer, Virginia, to whom the Penns were related. Betsy's father was Arthur Schoellkopf, chairman of the board of directors of Niagara Falls Power Company and Mayor of Niagara Falls, New York. Betsy Penn survived Jeff by nearly twenty years, during which time she became increasingly involved in philanthropic and community activities. She created the Betsy-Jeff Penn 4-H Educational Center on part of the estate. Most of the furnishings and art, showcasing 30 countries, were placed by the Penns.

The house and related buildings, and ultimately the internal furnishings, were given into the trusteeship of the University of North Carolina System in 1965. Because of high costs, N.C. State University closed the site to tours. Three years later Calvin Phelps, the founder of Renegade Tobacco Company, in August 2006, acquired the estate, claiming he intended to build a replica in Davie County. He decided to have a second home nearby and operate the site as a tourist attraction. But Phelps used funds from his tobacco company, which was successful for a while due to being exempt from the Tobacco Master Settlement Agreement which required a $5 per carton surcharge on cigarettes. He could sell his cigarettes more cheaply until the government began requiring exempt tobacco companies to pay "escrow" fees. Later, needed to finance his debt, Phelps obtained a mortgage backed by his companies. Bank of Granite, which had lent him money, cut him off. Federal agents seized the property and assets on September 28, 2010, as part of an ongoing bankruptcy proceeding. In September 2011, a bankruptcy trustee took over, and an order filed December 12 said a bankruptcy judge would require that all items in the house be sold at auction in April 2012. The two-day auction took place at the Greensboro Coliseum Complex in Greensboro, North Carolina, April 25 and 26, 2012, was conducted by Leland Little Auction & Estate Sales, Ltd. and Iron Horse Auction Company, Inc. , and raised approximately US$3.4 (~$4.58 million in 2024) Million.

In August 2012, the Museum and Archives of Rockingham County was expected to open, and certain items acquired at the auction were expected to be displayed.

On September 18, 2013, Chinqua Penn went into foreclosure. SunTrust Bank bought the property from Phelps for $1.4 million. Though SunTrust wanted $1.9 million, the property sold for considerably less to a private buyer.

The house and gardens were once open for tours, and the plantation offered tours through March 17, 2012.

Farmland adjoining the property is still operated as an experimental agricultural station by North Carolina State University.

== See also ==
- National Register of Historic Places
