= Henry, Sussex County, Virginia =

Henry, Virginia
- Unincorporated community
- Location within Virginia Location within the United States
- Coordinates: 36°47′49″N 77°23′34″W
- Country: United States
- State: Virginia
- County: Sussex
- Elevation: 128 ft (39 m)
- Time zone: UTC-5 (Eastern (EST))
  - Summer (DST): UTC-4 (EDT)
- Area code: 804
- GNIS feature ID: 1477408

Henry (also known as Henry Crossroads) is an unincorporated community in Sussex County, Virginia, United States. The community is 4.3 miles (6.9 km) east of Jarratt.
