= Fieldale Historic District =

Historic district in Virginia, United States

- U.S. National Register of Historic Places
- U.S. Historic district
- Virginia Landmarks Register
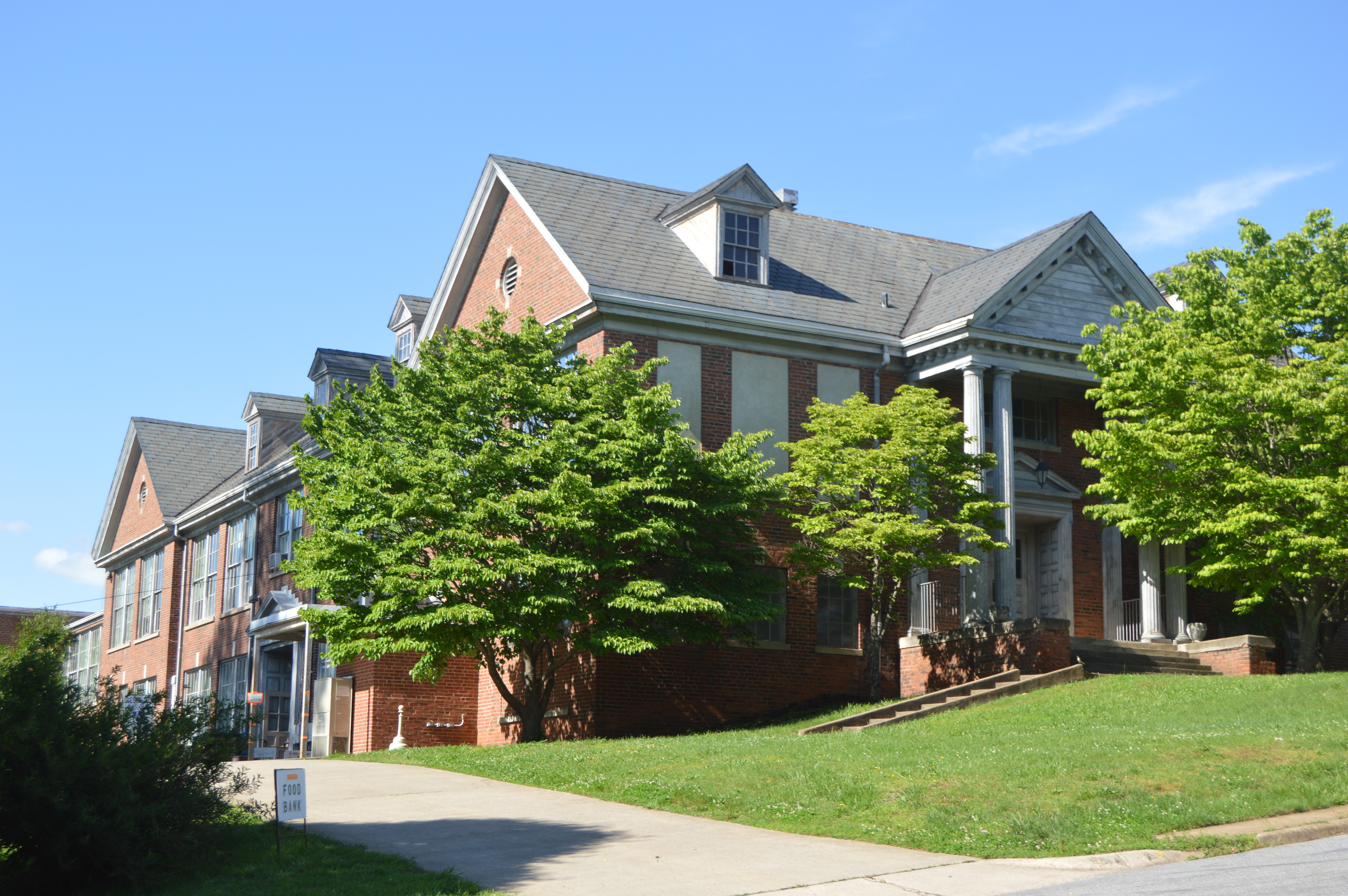
- Former school on Marshall Way

- Location within Virginia Location within the United States
- Location: Roughly bounded by 10th St., VA 682, Co. Rd. 609 & Chestnut St., Fieldale, Virginia
- Coordinates: 36°42′15″N 79°56′27″W
- Area: 257.5 acres (104.2 ha)
- Architectural style: Late 19th And 20th Century Revivals, Late 19th And Early 20th Century American Movements, Warren Truss
- NRHP reference No.: 08000072
- VLR No.: 044-5173

Significant dates
- Added to NRHP: February 22, 2008
- Designated VLR: December 7, 2007

Fieldale Historic District is a national historic district located at Fieldale, Henry County, Virginia.

== Buildings and structures ==
The district encompasses 329 contributing buildings and 2 contributing structures in the town of Fieldale. The majority of the buildings were built after 1916-1917 by the Marshall Field and Company as workers housing for the Fieldcrest Mills. Other notable buildings and structures include the Fieldcrest Mills Complex with the upper mill, lower mill, gatehouse, warehouse, water infiltration plant, and welder's shop; Danville & Western Station; Route 701 Bridge; Bank of Fieldale/Post Office; Fieldale Café (Fieldale Grocery; former Theater/Drug Store; Ramona's Dress Shop/Wilson's Grocery Store; Fieldale Elementary School (1924); Fieldale High School (1941); Fieldale Community Center (1937); Fieldale Hotel, and Fieldale Baptist Church. The former gas station building that houses Peggy's Antiques (044-5173-0186) was built by the Lustron Manufacturing Company. Also located in the district and separately listed are the Marshall Field and Company Clubhouse and Virginia Home.

== Recognition ==
It was listed on the National Register of Historic Places in 2008.
