= Marshall Field and Company Clubhouse =

- U.S. National Register of Historic Places
- U.S. Historic district – Contributing property
- Virginia Landmarks Register
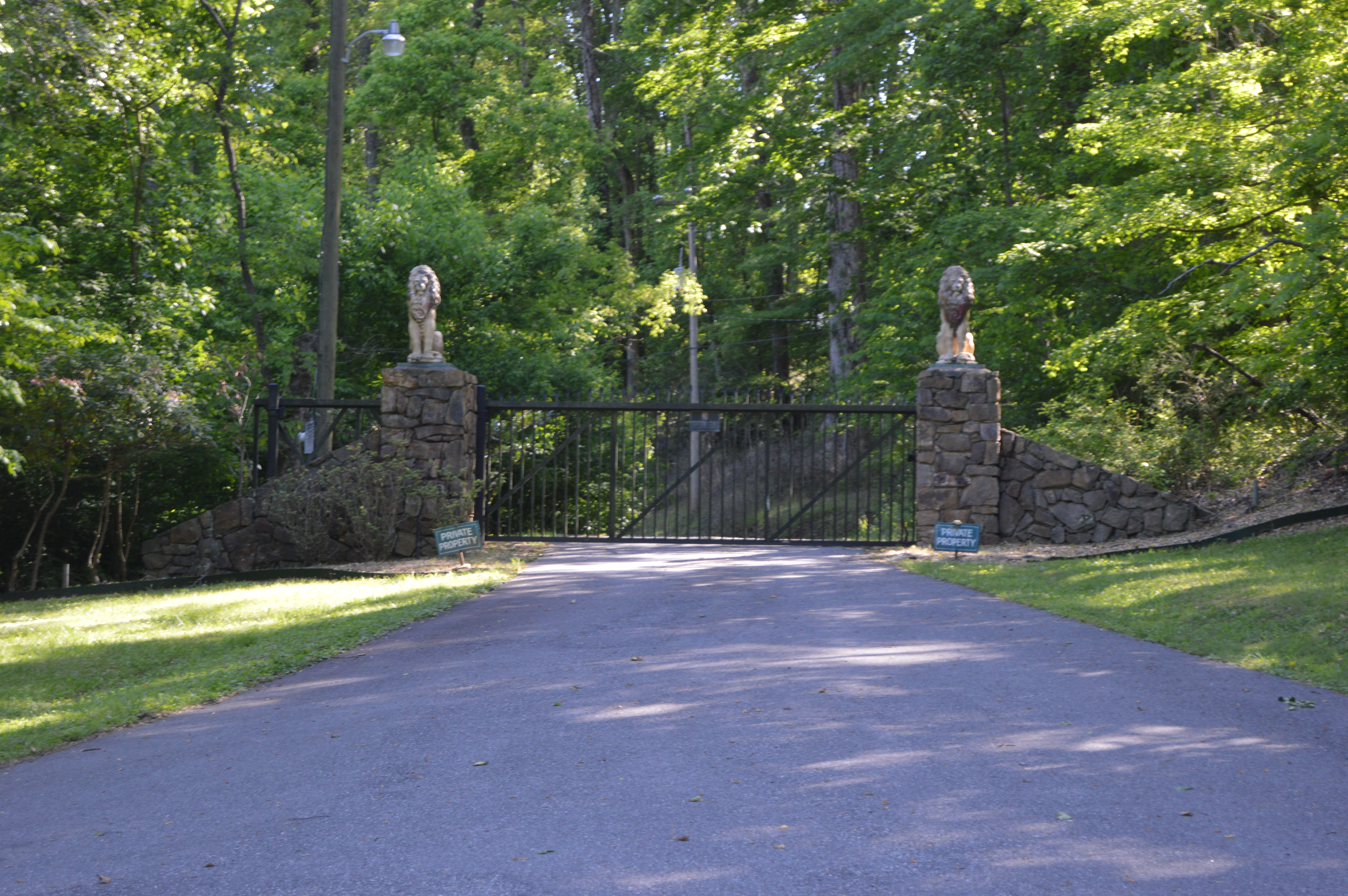
- Entrance to the property

- Location within Virginia Location within the United States
- Location: 2692 River Rd., Fieldale, Virginia
- Coordinates: 36°41′22″N 79°55′55″W
- Area: 488 acres (197 ha)
- Built: 1917
- Architectural style: Tudor Revival
- NRHP reference No.: 05000523
- VLR No.: 044-5166

Significant dates
- Added to NRHP: June 1, 2005
- Designated VLR: March 16, 2005

Marshall Field and Company Clubhouse, also known as Fieldcrest Lodge, is a historic clubhouse located at Fieldale, Henry County, Virginia. It was built in 1917, and is a two-story, Tudor Revival style building. It is constructed of native Henry County fieldstone, box beams, pebble dash stucco, and red terra cotta roof tile. Also on the property are a contributing carriage house, manager's house with a matching shed structure and a three-stall barn, and a regulation size tennis court. The clubhouse was built by Marshall Field and Company to house important figures visiting the Fieldcrest Mills.

It was listed on the National Register of Historic Places in 2005. It is located in the Fieldale Historic District.
