= Fieldale, Virginia =

- CDP
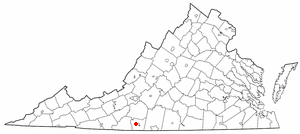
- Location of Fieldale, Virginia
- Coordinates: 36°41′59″N 79°56′22″W
- Country: United States
- State: Virginia
- County: Henry

Area
  - Total: 1.6 sq mi (4.2 km^{2})
  - Land: 1.6 sq mi (4.2 km^{2})
  - Water: 0 sq mi (0.0 km^{2})
- Elevation: 810 ft (247 m)

Population (2010)
  - Total: 879
  - Density: 540/sq mi (210/km^{2})
- Time zone: UTC−5 (Eastern (EST))
  - Summer (DST): UTC−4 (EDT)
- ZIP code: 24089
- Area code: 276
- FIPS code: 51-27744
- GNIS feature ID: 1495536

Fieldale is a census-designated place (CDP) in Henry County, Virginia, United States. As of the 2020 census, Fieldale had a population of 852. It is part of the Martinsville Micropolitan Statistical Area.

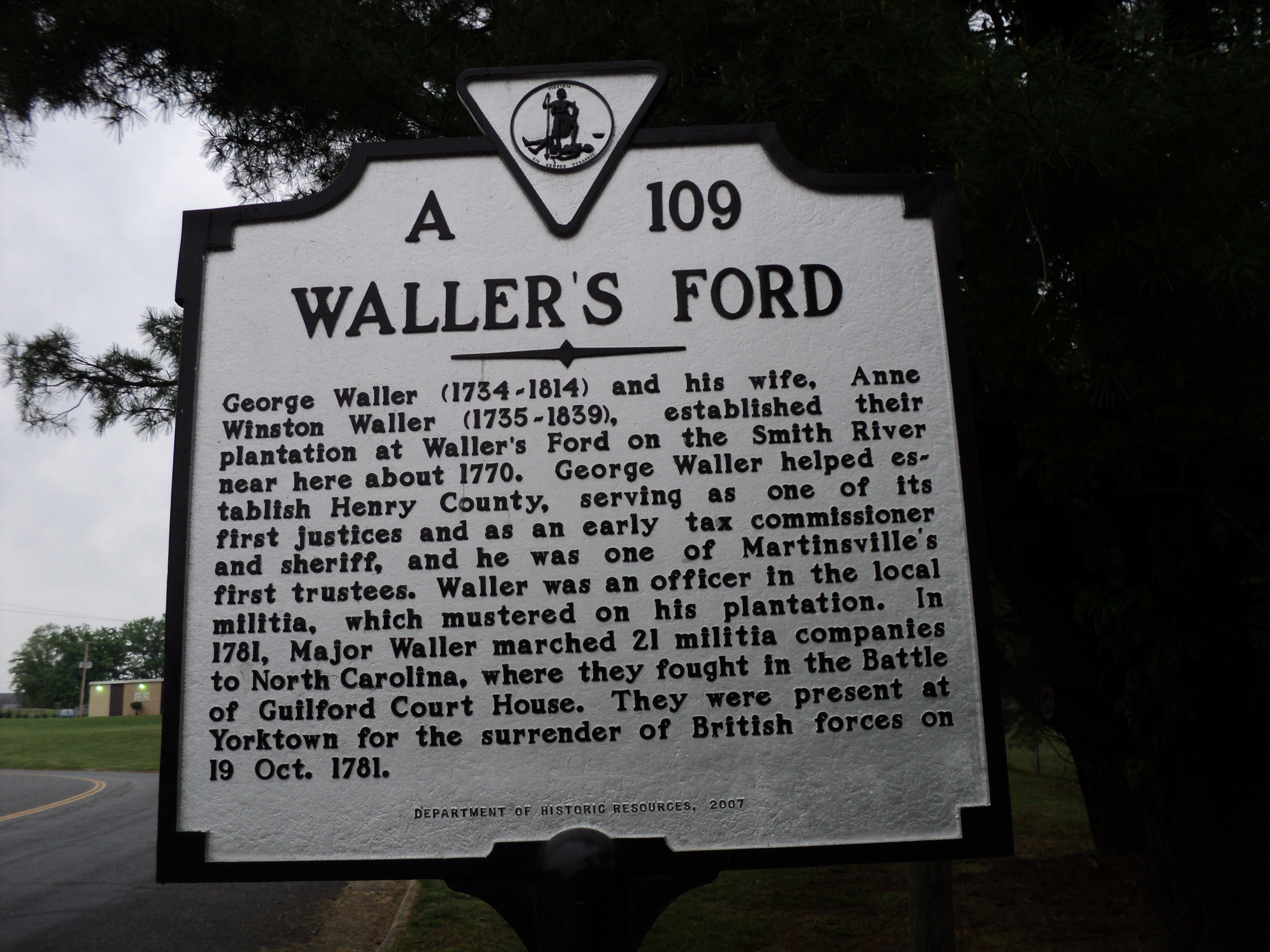
Waller's Ford, named for Col. George Waller. Today's Fieldale

== History ==
The area was first settled in 1770 by planter George Waller, an officer in the state militia who was later promoted to Colonel, and his wife Ann Winston (Carr), first cousin of statesman Patrick Henry, as a protected ford across the Smith River. The local militia trained on Col. Waller's acreage. The settlement was subsequently known as Waller's Ford for over a century. A Virginia Historical Highway Marker unveiled in September 2017 marks the location of Col. Waller's plantation. In 1916, Marshall Field & Company purchased the site from the Waller heirs and established Fieldcrest Mills, the town of Fieldale, and an 8,500-square-foot (790 m^{2}) company clubhouse, all completed in 1919.

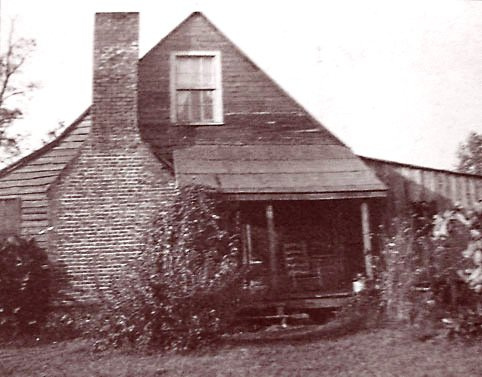
Home of Col. George Waller at Waller's Ford (later Fieldale), 1930

The Fieldale Historic District, Marshall Field and Company Clubhouse, and Virginia Home are listed on the National Register of Historic Places.

== Geography ==
Fieldale is located at 36°41′59″N 79°56′22″W (36.699850, −79.939482).

According to the United States Census Bureau, the CDP has a total area of 1.6 square miles (4.2 km^{2}), all land.

== Demographics ==
Historical population
Census	Pop.	Note	%±
1950	1,295		—
1960	1,499		15.8%
1970	1,337		−10.8%
1980	1,190		−11.0%
1990	1,018		−14.5%
2000	929		−8.7%
2010	879		−5.4%
U.S. Decennial Census; 1940 1950 1960 1970; 1980 1990 2000 2010

Fieldale first listed as an unincorprated community in the 1950 U.S. census; and was listed as a census designated place in the 1980 U.S. census.

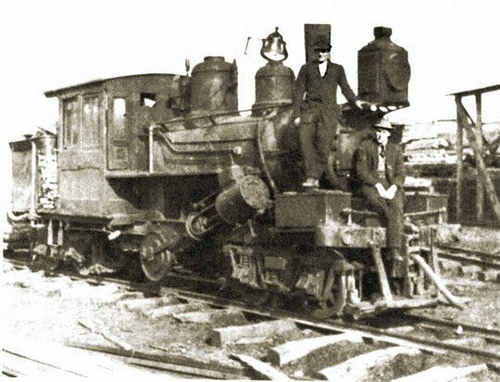
Engine, Danville and Western Railway, Fieldale, ca 1900

As of the census of 2000, there were 929 people, 420 households, and 275 families residing in the CDP. The population density was 575.6 people per square mile (222.8/km^{2}). There were 473 housing units at an average density of 293.1/sq mi (113.4/km^{2}). The racial makeup of the CDP was 97.20% White, 1.83% African American, 0.11% Pacific Islander, and 0.86% from two or more races. Hispanic or Latino of any race were 1.08% of the population.

There were 420 households, out of which 21.4% had children under the age of 18 living with them, 50.7% were married couples living together, 10.7% had a female householder with no husband present, and 34.5% were non-families. 31.9% of all households were made up of individuals, and 16.9% had someone living alone who was 65 years of age or older. The average household size was 2.21 and the average family size was 2.78.

In the CDP, the population was spread out, with 20.3% under the age of 18, 4.8% from 18 to 24, 25.5% from 25 to 44, 25.3% from 45 to 64, and 24.0% who were 22 years of age or older. The median age was 44 years. For every 100 females, there were 96.8 males. For every 100 females age 18 and over, there were 86.4 males.

The median income for a household in the CDP was $23,450, and the median income for a family was $30,845. Males had a median income of $25,278 versus $18,472 for females. The per capita income for the CDP was $12,919. About 19.4% of families and 22.0% of the population were below the poverty line, including 34.5% of those under age 18 and 18.8% of those age 65 or over.
