= Henry, Franklin County, Virginia =

Unincorporated community in Virginia, United States

Henry, Virginia
- Unincorporated community
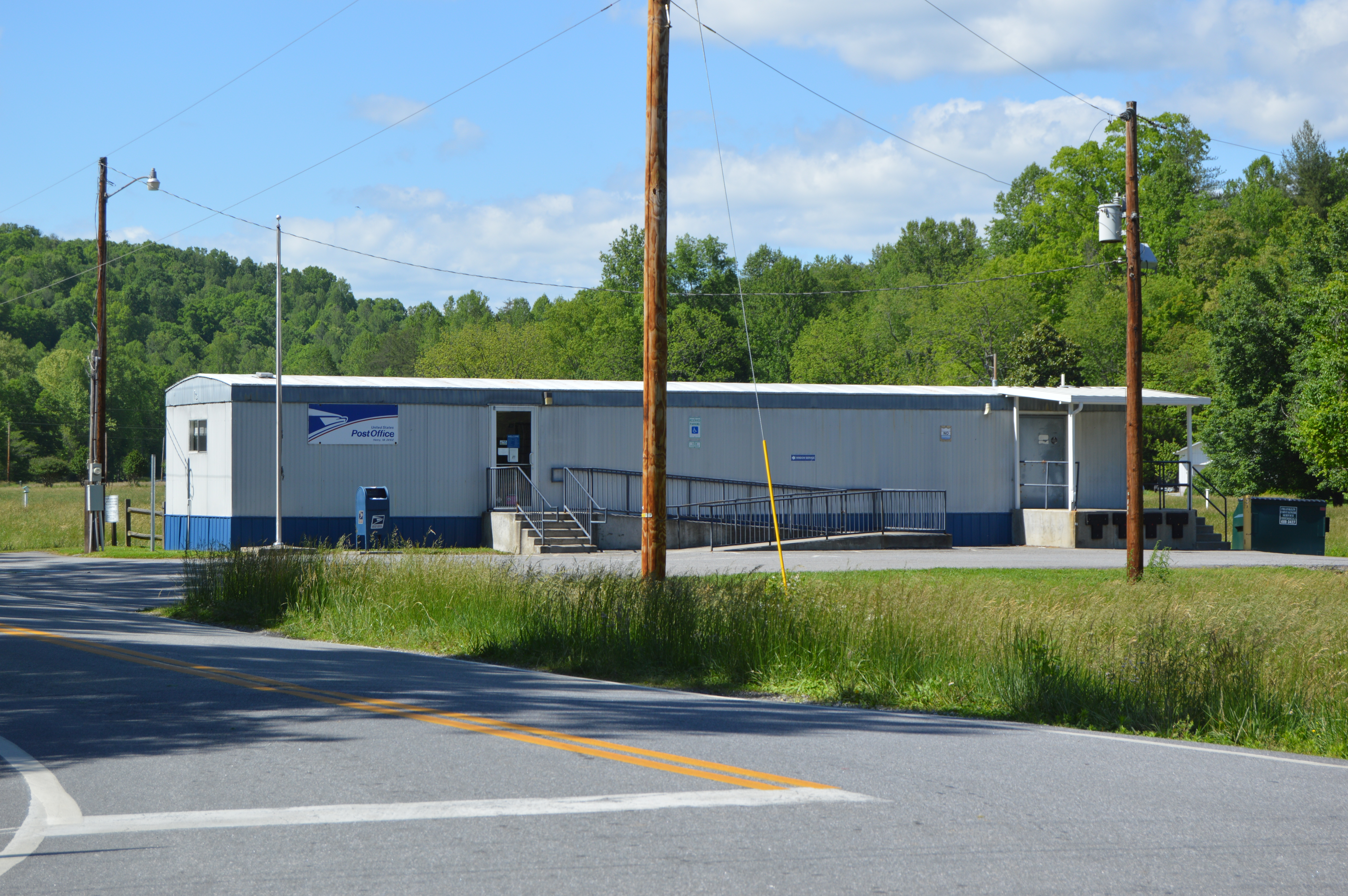
- Post office

- Location within Virginia Location within the United States
- Coordinates: 36°49′45″N 79°59′30″W
- Country: United States
- State: Virginia
- County: Franklin
- Elevation: 892 ft (272 m)
- Time zone: UTC-5 (Eastern (EST))
  - Summer (DST): UTC-4 (EDT)
- ZIP code: 24102
- Area code: 540
- GNIS feature ID: 1493072

Henry is an unincorporated community in Franklin County, Virginia, United States. The community is located along Town Creek, 12.9 miles (20.8 km) south-southwest of Rocky Mount. Henry has a post office with ZIP code 24102.
