= Belleview (Ridgeway, Virginia) =

Historic house in Virginia, United States

- U.S. National Register of Historic Places
- Virginia Landmarks Register
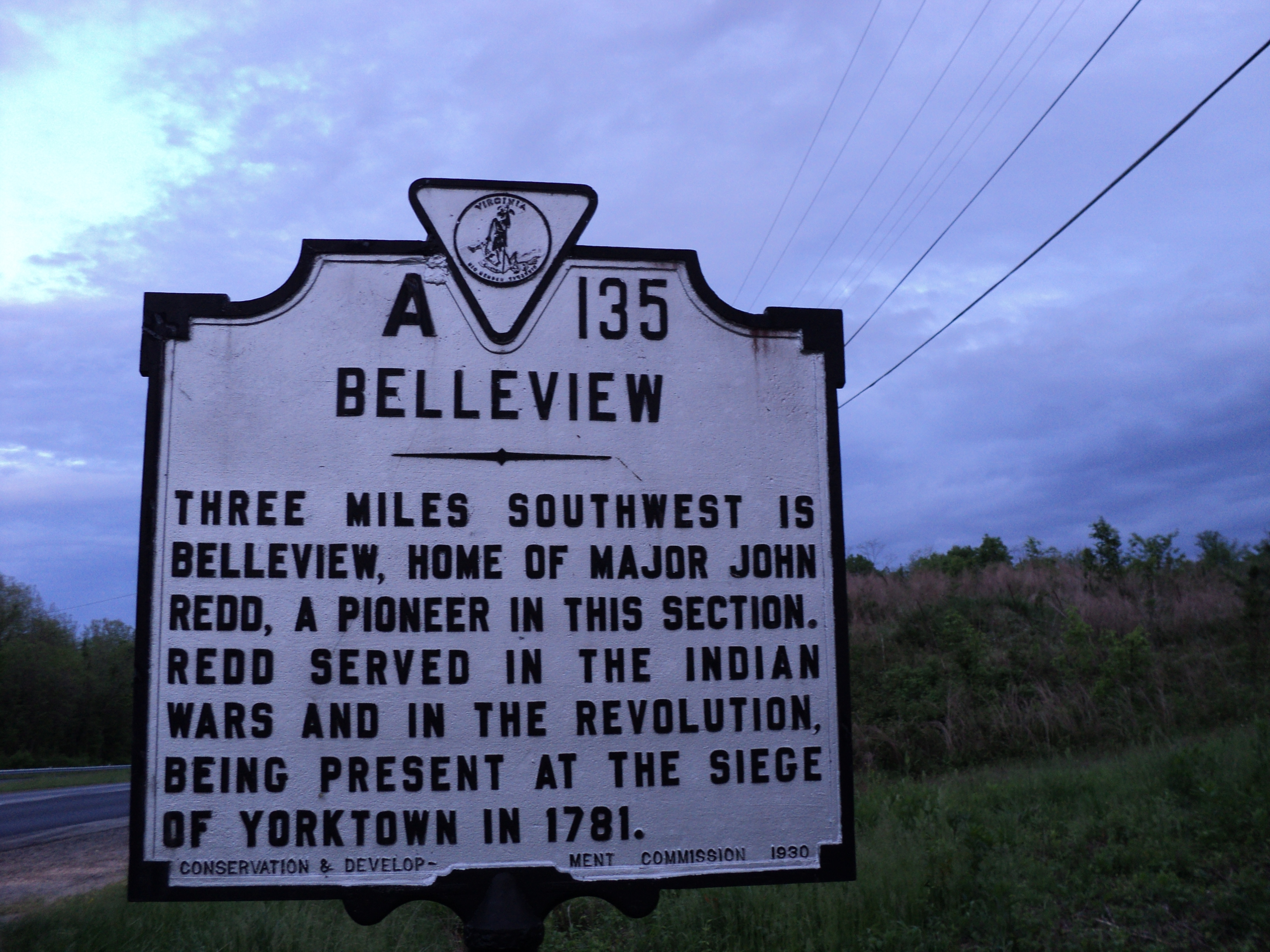
- Belleview Historic Marker, April 2010

- Location within Virginia Location within the United States
- Location: S of VA 641, Ridgeway, Virginia
- Coordinates: 36°36′23″N 79°53′16″W
- Area: 40 acres (16 ha)
- Built: 1783
- NRHP reference No.: 74002129
- VLR No.: 044-0002

Significant dates
- Added to NRHP: June 10, 1974
- Designated VLR: May 21, 1974

Belleview is a historic plantation house located near Ridgeway, Henry County, Virginia. It was built about 1783, and is a two-story, five-bay, frame dwelling with a gable roof. It has an original two-story ell and a sun porch and one-story wing added in the mid-1950s. The front facade features a two-tier portico supported by slender Greek Ionic order columns.

It was listed on the National Register of Historic Places in 1974.

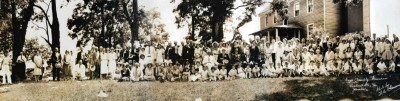
Last reunion of the descendants of Major John Redd, June 1931, Belleview Plantation, Henry County, Virginia
