= Sir George Henry Waller, 3rd Baronet =

Major-General Sir George Henry Waller Bt
- Born: 2 September 1837
- Died: 9 October 1892 (aged 55)
- Military career
- Allegiance: United Kingdom
- Branch: British Army
- Rank: Major-General
- Commands: 7th Regiment of Foot
- Conflicts: Crimean War

Major-General Sir George Henry Waller, 3rd Baronet (2 September 1837 – 9 October 1892) was a British Army officer who served as commanding officer of the 7th Regiment of Foot.

== Military career ==
Waller was commissioned into the 7th Regiment of Foot on 10 August 1854 and saw action in the Crimean War. He became commanding officer of the regiment in October 1871 and was promoted to major-general on 7 April 1886. He married Beatrice Katherine Frances, daughter of Christopher Tower; they had two sons and two daughters. He lived at Woodcote in Warwickshire.

Baronetage of the United Kingdom
Preceded by Thomas Wathen Waller	Baronet (of Braywick Lodge); 1892	Succeeded by Francis Waller
