= Ridgeway, Virginia =

- Town
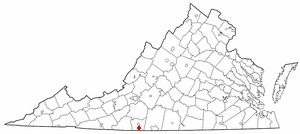
- Location of Ridgeway, Virginia
- Coordinates: 36°34′45″N 79°51′36″W
- Country: United States
- State: Virginia
- County: Henry

Area
  - Total: 0.95 sq mi (2.47 km^{2})
  - Land: 0.95 sq mi (2.47 km^{2})
  - Water: 0 sq mi (0.00 km^{2})
- Elevation: 948 ft (289 m)

Population (2020)
  - Total: 752
  - Estimate (2019): 693
  - Density: 725.7/sq mi (280.21/km^{2})
- Time zone: UTC−5 (Eastern (EST))
  - Summer (DST): UTC−4 (EDT)
- ZIP code: 24148
- Area code: 276
- FIPS code: 51-67208
- GNIS feature ID: 1473206

Ridgeway is a town in Henry County, Virginia, United States. As of the 2020 census, Ridgeway had a population of 752. It is part of the Martinsville Micropolitan Statistical Area. Martinsville Speedway, a NASCAR racetrack, is located just within Ridgeway town limits.

== History ==
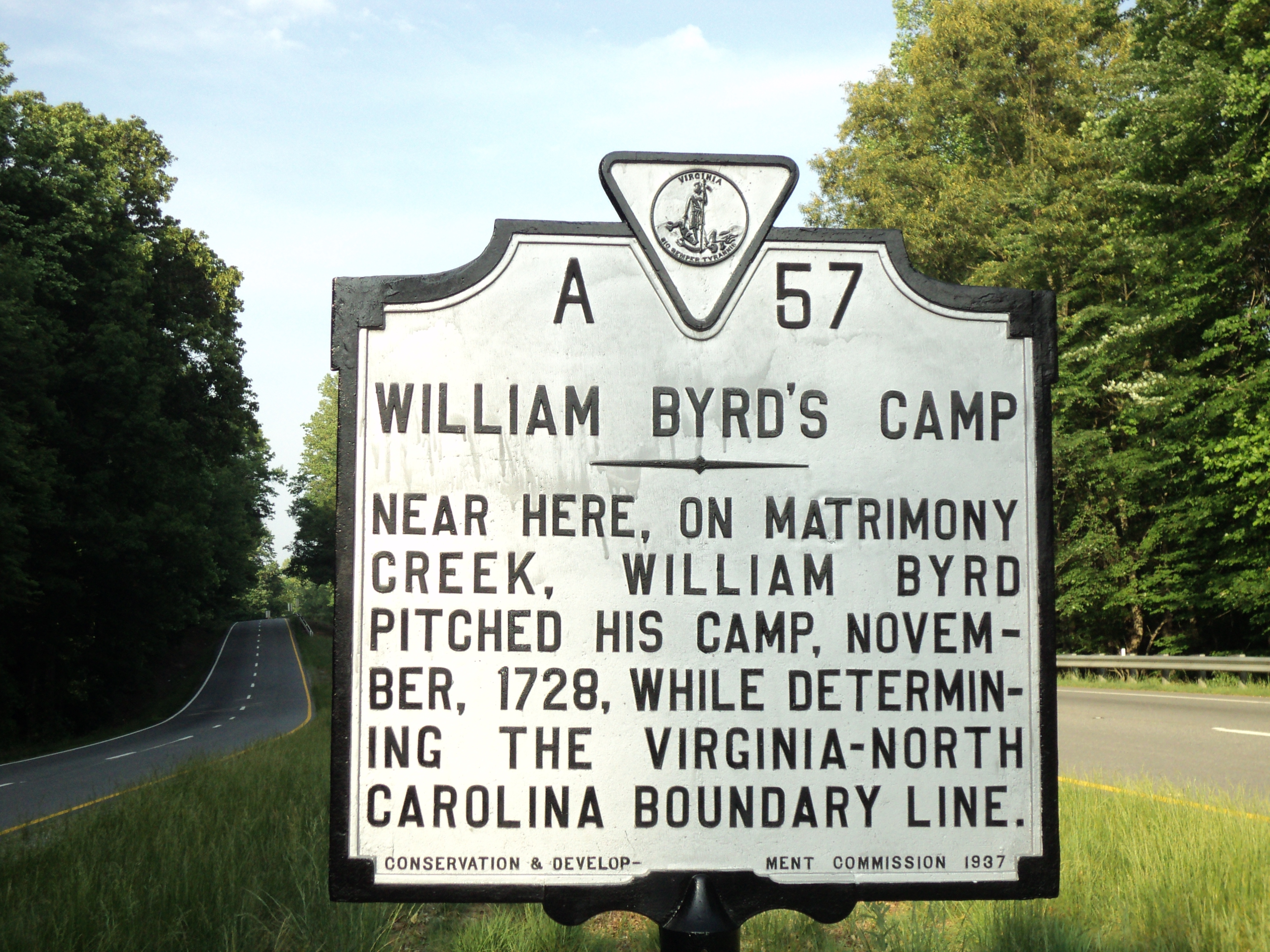
Historic marker for William Byrd's camp on his expedition to survey the Dividing Line, Henry County, Virginia, 1728

Approximately three miles south of Ridgeway in Henry County on U.S. Route 220 is a Virginia State historic marker noting the passing of the surveying party of William Byrd II, who moved through the area in 1728 on his expedition to survey the dividing line between Virginia and North Carolina.

Belleview and Ingleside are listed on the National Register of Historic Places.

== Geography ==
Ridgeway is located in southern Henry County at 36°34′45″N 79°51′36″W (36.579148, −79.860078). U.S. Route 220 passes through the west side of the town, leading north 8 miles (13 km) to Martinsville and 59 miles (95 km) to Roanoke; and south 40 miles (64 km) to Greensboro, North Carolina. Virginia State Route 87 passes through the center of Ridgeway and leads southeast 8 miles (13 km) to Eden, North Carolina.

According to the United States Census Bureau, Ridgeway has a total area of 0.97 square miles (2.5 km^{2}), all land. The north side of Ridgeway drains via Marrowbone Creek and Reds Creek to the Smith River, a tributary of the Dan River, while the south side of town drains to Matrimony Creek, also a tributary of the Dan River.

== Demographics ==
Historical population
Census	Pop.	Note	%±
1890	236		—
1900	332		40.7%
1910	393		18.4%
1920	320		−18.6%
1930	359		12.2%
1940	422		17.5%
1950	440		4.3%
1960	524		19.1%
1970	624		19.1%
1980	858		37.5%
1990	752		−12.4%
2000	775		3.1%
2010	742		−4.3%
2020	752		1.3%
U.S. Decennial Census

As of the census of 2000, there were 775 people, 310 households, and 221 families living in the town. The population density was 825.3 people per square mile (318.3/km^{2}). There were 327 housing units at an average density of 348.2 per square mile (134.3/km^{2}). The racial makeup of the town was 79.87% White, 16.00% African American, 2.45% Asian, 1.03% from other races, and 0.65% from two or more races. Hispanic or Latino of any race were 2.32% of the population.

There were 310 households, out of which 31.3% had children under the age of 18 living with them, 54.2% were married couples living together, 13.2% had a female householder with no husband present, and 28.4% were non-families. 26.1% of all households were made up of individuals, and 10.6% had someone living alone who was 65 years of age or older. The average household size was 2.50 and the average family size was 3.01.

In the town, the population was spread out, with 25.4% under the age of 18, 6.1% from 18 to 24, 27.7% from 25 to 44, 28.4% from 45 to 64, and 12.4% who were 65 years of age or older. The median age was 39 years. For every 100 females, there were 86.3 males. For every 100 females age 18 and over, there were 80.6 males.

The median income for a household in the town was $34,196, and the median income for a family was $39,500. Males had a median income of $27,109 versus $21,146 for females. The per capita income for the town was $16,054. About 12.1% of families and 12.0% of the population were below the poverty line, including 12.0% of those under age 18 and 15.3% of those age 65 or over.

== Notable people ==
- George Clanton, electronic musician
- Jeff Hensley, NASCAR driver
- Jimmy Hensley, NASCAR driver
- Roscoe Reynolds, Virginia state senator
- Rodney Sawyers, NASCAR driver
