= Middleton House =

Historic house in North Carolina, United States

- U.S. National Register of Historic Places
- Location within North Carolina Location within the United States
- Location: 2721 Robinhood Rd., Winston-Salem, North Carolina
- Coordinates: 36°7′3″N 80°17′32″W
- Area: 5 acres (2.0 ha)
- Built: 1829, c. 1930-1933
- Architect: William Roy Wallace; Ellen Biddle Shipman
- Architectural style: Federal
- NRHP reference No.: 00001552
- Added to NRHP: December 28, 2000

Middleton House, also known as the Chatham–Hanes House and R. Philip Hanes Jr. House, is a historic home located at Winston-Salem, Forsyth County, North Carolina. It was built about 1829, and located on a hill overlooking the Savannah River in northwestern South Carolina. The two-story, five-bay, Federal style frame dwelling was dismantled and moved to its present site in 1930. It was subsequently reconstructed by architect William Roy Wallace and set in a landscape designed by Ellen Biddle Shipman. The front facade features a two-tier, center-bay porch with graceful Tuscan order columns. Also on the property is the contributing compatible garage/apartment (c. 1930). After Phillip Hanes’ death in 2011 the house and grounds were donated to Wake Forest University but the house was vacant. In 2020 the house and surrounding land was sold to a developer and the house was purchased and renovated into a family home again.

It was listed on the National Register of Historic Places in 2000.
