= Ellen Biddle Shipman =

American landscape architect (1869–1950)

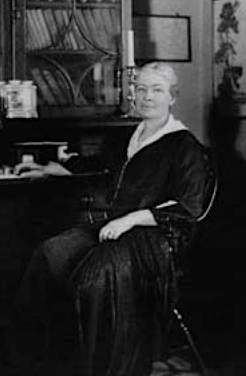
- Shipman at Beekman Place, her NYC home
- Born: Ellen Biddle; November 5, 1869; Philadelphia, Pennsylvania, United States
- Died: March 27, 1950 (aged 80); Warwick Camp, Bermuda
- Education: Radcliffe College
- Occupation: Landscape architect
- Known for: Landscape architecture, garden design
- Notable work: Longue Vue House and Gardens, Sarah P. Duke Gardens, Saint-Gaudens National Historic Site
- Spouse: Louis Evan Shipman
- Children: Evan Biddle Shipman
- Parent(s): James Biddle (1832–1910); Ellen Fish McGowan Biddle (1841–1922)
- Relatives: Clement Biddle (great-grandfather); John McGowan (uncle)

Ellen Biddle Shipman (née Ellen Biddle; November 5, 1869 – March 27, 1950) was an American landscape architect known for her formal gardens and lush planting style. Along with Beatrix Farrand and Marian Cruger Coffin, she dictated the style of the time and strongly influenced landscape design as a member of the first generation to break into the largely male occupation.

Commenting about the male dominated field to The New York Times in 1938, she said "before women took hold of the profession, landscape architects were doing what I call cemetery work." Shipman preferred to look on her career of using plantings as if she "were painting pictures as an artist." Little of her work remains today because of the labor-intensive style of her designs, but there exist preserved spaces, including the Sarah P. Duke Gardens at Duke University, often cited as one of the most beautiful American college campuses.

== Early life ==
Ellen was born in Philadelphia, and she spent her childhood in Texas and the Arizona Territory. Her father, Colonel James Biddle, was a career Army officer, stationed on the western frontier. When the safety of his family was threatened, he moved them to the McGowan farm in Elizabeth, New Jersey. She attended boarding school in Baltimore, Maryland, where her interests in the arts emerged and by her twenties she had already started drawing garden designs.

When she entered the Harvard annex, Radcliffe College, she met a playwright attending Harvard named Louis Shipman. They left school after one year, married, and moved to Plainfield, New Hampshire, in the Cornish Art Colony, which included Maxfield Parrish and Augustus Saint-Gaudens. The colony is said to have been landscaped by artists who were not architects, but had artistically trained eyes and an awareness for the aesthetics of repose, which gave rise to a collection of some of the finest gardens in the country. Shipman took strongly to the Cornish style, one that focused on geometric patterns and colonial plantings, and with it created her own style – a style which did not go unnoticed.

== Collaboration ==
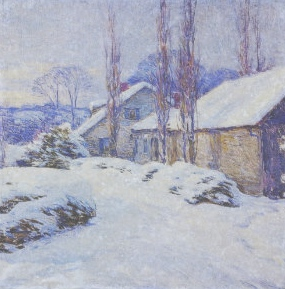
Willard Metcalf, a fellow member of the Cornish Art Colony in Plainfield, painted this while staying with the Shipmans at Brook Place. Ellen and her husband renovated the house in an Italianate Style. Painted here is the original part of the house.

Shipman's colleague and fellow member of the Cornish Art Colony, Charles A. Platt, was an artist and architect known for his interest in Italian gardens. Platt recognized Shipman's talents. He did not know much about horticulture, but was highly respected and thought of as "the man who could design both house and garden for a country estate", for he had recently made a trip to Italy and wrote a book about the gardens there.

By the time the Shipmans divorced in 1910, Ellen Shipman was well on her way to establishing herself as a talented garden designer nationwide. She and Platt played off their mutual requirements: Platt needed Ellen for her knowledge of horticulture and Ellen needed Platt for his knowledge of drafting and design. Shipman was also heavily influenced by Gertrude Jekyll's brilliant use of borders, as well as memories of her grandparents’ farm. By 1920 she was working independently of Platt, though they continued to collaborate on his residential projects.

=== Designs ===
Among Shipman's earliest collaborations with Platt was the Cooperstown, New York estate of Fynmere in 1913, owned by the Cooper family on the edge of the village. This project, for descendants of William Cooper, provided significant visibility for Shipman. While the stone mansion was demolished in 1979, a few elements of the landscape work survive. Shipman also designed the adjoining Cooper estate of Heathcote, which is extant today in private hands. A similar task was undertaken at the Gwinn Estate in Cleveland, where she was asked by Platt to aid him and Warren H. Manning in their garden designs. It was finished in 1912, one of her earliest projects, and one where her job was largely planting oriented, filling the designs of Platt with lush flower arrangements. The courtyard gardens of Manhattan's Astor Court Building were another Platt-Shipman collaboration. Platt and Shipman's 1915 design for the Parmelee estate, The Causeway, in Washington D.C. included a Wild Garden surrounding the mansion and formal gardens. It featured mature trees, large clumps of plants such as rhododendron, walking and riding paths, stone bridges and a pond. This, and a substantial one-acre Wild Garden at Longue Vue House and Gardens, are the only surviving examples of Shipman's Wild Gardens. Much of grounds of the Causeway, now called Tregaron Estate, is open to the public as the Tregaron Conservancy.

Seen in many ways as Platt's protégé, Shipman was asked on various occasions to rework one of his gardens, including Platt's first major commission, High Court. Located across the road from Platt's own house in Cornish, New Hampshire, Anson Goodyear hired Shipman to revitalize the plantings and reconfigure the garden walls.

In 1927, she collaborated with David Adler on the William McCormick Blair Estate, "Port O'Call" at Crab Tree Farm in Lake Bluff, Illinois, designing a walled garden on the west side of the house to protect the plants from the wind off Lake Michigan.

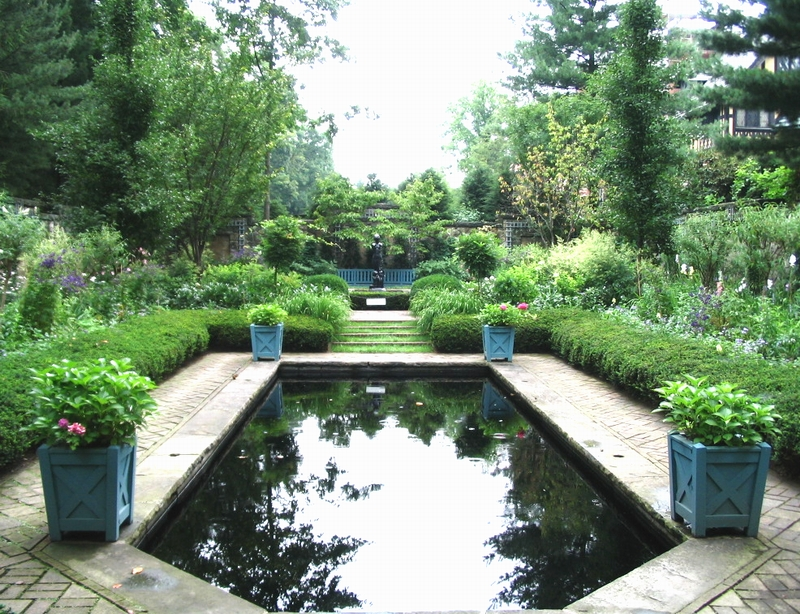
The reflecting pool at Stan Hywet Hall, Akron, Ohio, 1929

Her other significant gardens include the Bayou Bend Gardens, Longue Vue Gardens in New Orleans, Stan Hywet Gardens, the Graycliff Estate (now under restoration), Stranahan Estate (also under reconstruction), Middleton House and Robert M. Hanes House at Winston-Salem, North Carolina and Duke University's Sarah P. Duke Gardens, which is often named one of her finest works. The Gardens at Rynwood in Long Island, an estate designed by architect, Roger Bullard, is featured in the Smithsonian Institute's Garden Club of America Collection and is considered one of the best examples from her "mature period."

Shipman created her own residential gardens all over the United States, collaborating with many architects. Her planting plans softened the bones of geometric architecture with planting designs that were muscular enough to speak for themselves. She once said, "Remember that the design of your place is its skeleton upon which you will later plant to make your picture. Keep that skeleton as simple as possible."

== Public recognition and solo work ==
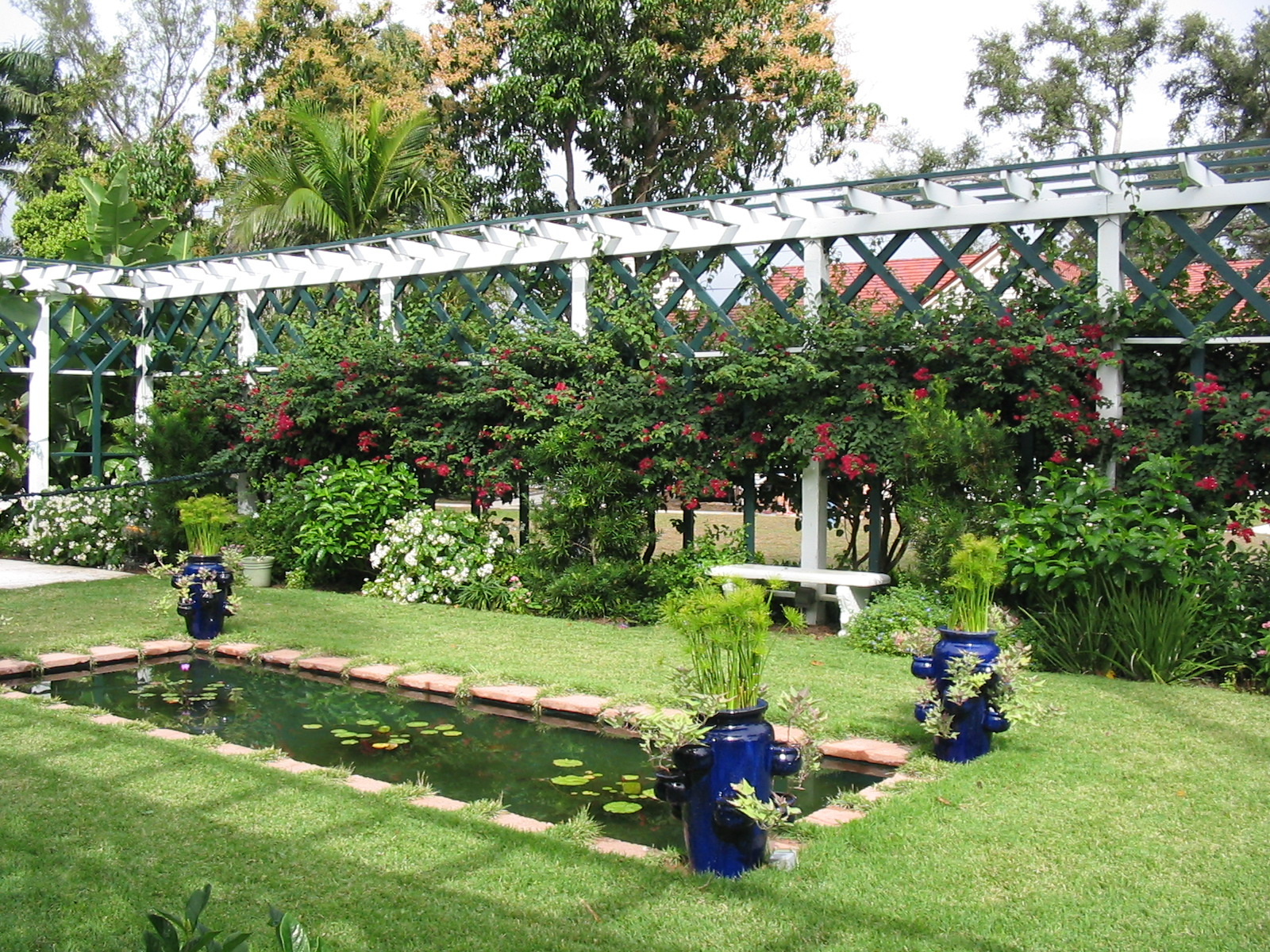
Shipman designed The Moonlight Garden at the Edison and Ford Winter Estates in Fort Myers, Florida, for Thomas Edison's wife Mina.

Shipman's gardens often appeared in magazines, including House Beautiful. In 1933, House & Garden named her the "Dean of Women Landscape Architects". She lectured widely, and completed over 400 projects. Her archives are at Cornell University. Because much of her work includes labor-intensive plantings and borders, many have not survived. However, it was because of these borders that she was able to connect with her female clientele. Her intent was to provide privacy and a place for interaction with the surroundings. Women found the gardens provided familiarity and comfort.

It is said that throughout the 40 years she practiced landscape architecture, Shipman would only hire graduates from Lowthorpe School of Landscape Architecture, Gardening, and Horticulture for Women. Although it is not thoroughly understood why this was her hiring practice, it is widely believed that because of the time, women were not being given apprenticeships in male offices.
