= William Roy Wallace =

American architect

- Born: June 19, 1889; Quarryville, Pennsylvania, U.S.
- Died: February 10, 1983 (aged 93); Winston-Salem, North Carolina, U.S.
- Occupation: Architect

William Roy Wallace (June 19, 1889 – February 10, 1983) was an American architect, prominent in the 20th century.

== Early life ==
Wallace was born in Quarryville, Pennsylvania, in 1889. He was the third child of Harry Eugene Wallace and Mary Brubaker.

He graduated high school in 1909 and began a one-year scholarship to Swarthmore College. His parents' limited funds meant he had to withdraw at the end of the scholarship.

== Career ==
Wallace began his career as a protégé of Charles Barton Keen, who designed country houses for the elite of Philadelphia, Pennsylvania, and Winston-Salem, North Carolina. He began as an office boy, then became a draftsman and finally partner.

He and Keen moved to Winston-Salem in 1923 to work on the construction of the R. J. Reynolds High School, and Wallace remained in the city to oversee their Winston-Salem office, housed in the Wachovia Building. During the remainder of the 1920s, the duo worked on several homes in Reynolda Park and Stratford Road, before returning to Philadelphia for five years.

In 1928, Keen made the move to Winston-Salem permanent, establishing an architectural practice with Harold Macklin and James M. Conrad in the city's Reynolds Building. The business was responsible for the designs of buildings all around North Carolina, including Burlington, Greensboro and High Point.

== Selected works ==
Wallace was responsible for the following buildings:

- Middleton House, Winston-Salem, North Carolina
- C. A. Kent House, Winston-Salem, North Carolina
- Robert M. Hanes House, Winston-Salem, North Carolina
- P. Huber Hanes Sr. House, Winston-Salem, North Carolina
- Eltham Manor, Virginia
- Edgewood, Stanleytown, Virginia (1951–1953 renovation)

== Personal life ==
Wallace married Jeanette Dykes Turner (1895–1979), with whom he had two children: daughter Jean and son William Jr. William Jr. joined his father's practice after World War II and managed it after William Sr.'s death in 1983.

== Death ==
Wallace died at his home at 732 Westover Avenue in Winston-Salem in 1983. He was 93. After a funeral service at Voglers Reynolds Road Chapel, he was interred in the city's Forsyth Memorial Park, alongside his wife of 64 years, who preceded him in death by ten years.
