= Heading for Heaven =

1947 film by Lewis D. Collins

- Movie poster
- Directed by: Lewis D. Collins
- Written by: Lewis D. Collins; Oscar Mugge
- Produced by: George Moskov; Jack Schwarz
- Starring: Stuart Erwin; Glenda Farrell; Russ Vincent; Irene Ryan
- Cinematography: George Robinson
- Edited by: Martin G. Cohn
- Music by: Hal Borne
- Distributed by: Producers Releasing Corporation
- Release date: December 6, 1947
- Running time: 65 minutes
- Country: United States
- Language: English

Heading for Heaven is a 1947 American comedy film starring Stuart Erwin and Glenda Farrell. The film was directed by Lewis D. Collins and is based on the 1929 play For the Sake of the Family by Charles Webb and Daniel Brown. Made by Pathe Industries for release by the Producers Releasing Corporation. The film was later picked up for distribution by Eagle-Lion Films after PRC's demise. It was one of several films of the time depicting fraudulent spiritualism such as Nightmare Alley (1947), The Spiritualist (1948), and London Belongs to Me (1948).

== Plot ==
Henry Elkins inherits a large parcel of land from his father and grandfather in what is now the eastern part of the city of Elkinsville. Having been told never to sell the property by his ancestors, Henry has refused several lucrative offers wanting to purchase the land for a cemetery, incinerator, or the city dump in favor of wishing to develop a housing estate.

Henry lives with his wife, Nora Elkins, who believes in a fraudulent Swami who conducts seances, a snappy housekeeper, his lazy brother-in-law, his daughter, and a cat. They all create problems for him. However, Henry dreams the land will someday bring him great fortune and self-respect.

Later, Henry’s life changes when he overhears information about his doctor's patient who is terminally ill. Henry believes this terminally ill patient is himself when he goes for a physical for an insurance policy. He agrees to sell his land to an airline wishing to build an airport, giving his wife and family the money as a legacy. However, several people in Elkinsville give Henry fraudulent information to lower his price because they intend to acquire it for themselves. One even uses the Swami to convince Henry to sell the land to them, who will then sell it to the airlines.

Surrounded by problems, Henry goes to a peaceful lake to meditate. He falls asleep but is awoken by nightmares, causing him to fall into the water. As he is drying his clothes, they also fall in the water and float away. A policeman discovers his clothes, which contain a note to his wife that Henry has taken his own life. Henry's return to his home is delayed when he has to steal the clothes of a scarecrow, leading him to a pair of hoboes who befriend him and get him drunk. He returns in time to find a real representative from the airline making Henry a substantial offer for his property that will include a housing estate, but first Henry decides to teach the swindlers and his gullible family a lesson by crashing a seance they have planned.

== Cast ==
- Stuart Erwin as Henry Elkins
- Glenda Farrell as Nora Elkins
- Russ Vincent as Swami
- Irene Ryan as Molly the Maid
- Milburn Stone as Elwood Harding
- George O'Hanlon as Alvin Ponacress
- Janis Wilson as Janie Elkins
- Ralph Hodges as Danny Wingate
- Dick Elliott as Roger Wingate
- Charles Williams as Eddie Williams
- Selmer Jackson as Doctor

== Home media ==
Heading for Heaven was released on DVD on February 22, 2005.
