= Stanleytown, Virginia =

- CDP
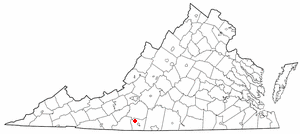
- Location of Stanleytown, Virginia
- Coordinates: 36°45′6″N 79°56′55″W
- Country: United States
- State: Virginia
- County: Henry

Area
  - Total: 2.7 sq mi (7.0 km^{2})
  - Land: 2.7 sq mi (7.0 km^{2})
  - Water: 0 sq mi (0.0 km^{2})
- Elevation: 781 ft (238 m)

Population (2010)
  - Total: 1,422
  - Density: 530/sq mi (200/km^{2})
- Time zone: UTC−5 (Eastern (EST))
  - Summer (DST): UTC−4 (EDT)
- ZIP code: 24168
- Area code: 276
- FIPS code: 51-75040
- GNIS feature ID: 1496253

Stanleytown is a census-designated place (CDP) in Henry County, Virginia, United States. As of the 2020 census, Stanleytown had a population of 1,385. It is part of the Martinsville Micropolitan Statistical Area.

== History ==
Edgewood and Stoneleigh houses are listed on the National Register of Historic Places.

== Geography ==
Stanleytown is located at 36°45′6″N 79°56′55″W (36.751657, −79.948714).

According to the United States Census Bureau, the CDP has a total area of 2.7 square miles (6.9 km^{2}), all land.

== Demographics ==
As of the census of 2000, there were 1,515 people, 662 households, and 442 families residing in the CDP. The population density was 564.3 people per square mile (218.3/km^{2}). There were 723 housing units at an average density of 269.3/sq mi (104.2/km^{2}). The racial makeup of the CDP was 88.32% White, 2.57% African American, 0.13% Native American, 0.13% Pacific Islander, 7.46% from other races, and 1.39% from two or more races. Hispanic or Latino of any race were 11.49% of the population.

There were 662 households, out of which 22.7% had children under the age of 18 living with them, 52.0% were married couples living together, 9.4% had a female householder with no husband present, and 33.1% were non-families. 27.9% of all households were made up of individuals, and 14.0% had someone living alone who was 65 years of age or older. The average household size was 2.29 and the average family size was 2.73.

In the CDP, the population was spread out, with 17.8% under the age of 18, 8.8% from 18 to 24, 27.1% from 25 to 44, 25.6% from 45 to 64, and 20.7% who were 65 years of age or older. The median age was 42 years. For every 100 females, there were 105.8 males. For every 100 females age 18 and over, there were 103.9 males.

The median income for a household in the CDP was $32,386, and the median income for a family was $36,927. Males had a median income of $26,164 versus $17,063 for females. The per capita income for the CDP was $18,959. About 12.4% of families and 14.4% of the population were below the poverty line, including 14.7% of those under age 18 and 19.6% of those age 65 or over.
