= Stoneleigh (Stanleytown, Virginia) =

Historic house in Virginia, United States

- U.S. National Register of Historic Places
- Virginia Landmarks Register
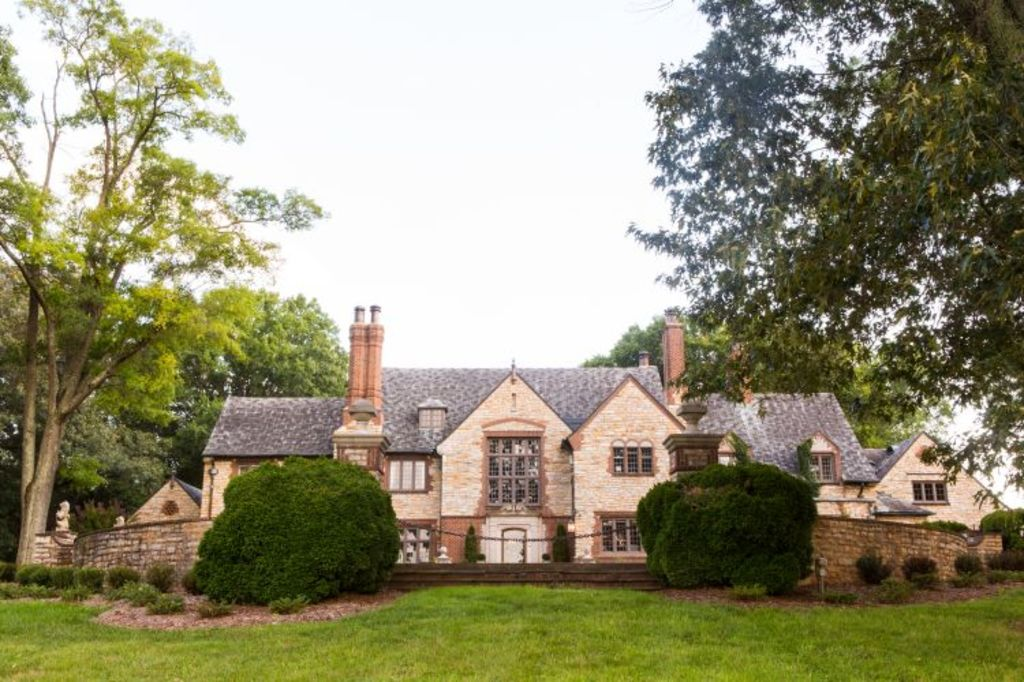

- Location within Virginia Location within the United States
- Location: Oak Level Rd.<be>Stanleytown, Virginia
- Coordinates: 36°44′5″N 79°56′48″W
- Area: 16 acres (6.5 ha)
- Built: 1929
- Architect: Tinsley and McBroom
- Architectural style: Tudor Revival
- NRHP reference No.: 82001820
- VLR No.: 044-0087

Significant dates
- Added to NRHP: November 24, 1982
- Designated VLR: March 16, 1982

Stoneleigh, the former abode of Governor Thomas B. Stanley, began its construction in 1929 and it was completed in 1932. It was built in the Tudor Revival-style and crafted out of stone from the nearby Smith River. Stanley inhabited this 25-room mansion until his death in 1970, after which his children took ownership. They donated the house to Ferrum College in 1980

In 1993 Bill and Barbara Topa had plans on making Stoneleigh into a four-star lodging and dining facility when they purchased the home in 1993. The Topas' plan did not get completed, and in 1998 Kevin and Whitney Witasick bought Stoneleigh for 800,000. The couple's ownership of the estate was cut short when Mr. Witasack was charged with tax evasion, tax perjury, and failing to file a tax return when he lied about using the home for business purposes. In 2010, Stoneleigh was again sold but this time to Citimortgage, a New York mortgage company, for 1.12 million dollars. When Citimortgage purchased the grounds, a North Carolina liability company filed a lawsuit against the New York company, claiming they breached contracts with the company to buy the Estate. The estate went up for auction on September 27, 2014. It is now privately owned but operated as a bed and breakfast, and can be rented in its entirety.
