= Evan Shipman =

American novelist (1904–1957)

Evan B. Shipman
- Born: October 23, 1904; Plainfield, New Hampshire, U.S.
- Died: June 24, 1957 (aged 53); New York Hospital, New York City, U.S.
- Writing career
- Notable work: Free For All (1935)
- Military career
- Allegiance: Spanish Loyalists; United States
- Years: May–July 1937; 1941–1945
- Rank: Sergeant major (U.S.A.)
- Battles: Spanish Civil War; Battle of Jarama; Battle of Brunete (WIA); World War II

Evan Biddle Shipman (October 23, 1904 – June 24, 1957) was an American novelist, poet, newspaperman and soldier. After schooling in New England, Shipman befriended fellow American writer Ernest Hemingway in 1920s Paris and wrote poems and articles for various American magazines. In 1937, he aided the Republican side in the Spanish Civil War and was wounded in battle. He returned to the United States in 1938 and served in the U.S. Army during World War II as a war correspondent. He was a long-time columnist of The Morning Telegraph and a recognized expert on horse breeding. The Evan Shipman Handicap is named for him.

== Life ==
Evan Biddle Shipman was born in Plainfield, New Hampshire, on October 23, 1904, son of the playwright and editor Louis Evan Shipman and his wife Ellen McGowan Biddle Shipman, the landscape architect. He attended various schools in New Hampshire and Massachusetts and read widely, encouraged by his father; although a lifelong love of horse racing affected his attendance.

After 1917, Shipman traveled in Europe, taking degrees at the University of Louvain and the Sorbonne. He returned to Paris in 1924 to focus on his writing. In Paris, he became an acquaintance of fellow American expatriates Ernest Hemingway and Gertrude Stein, and the French painter André Masson. Shipman enjoyed the boozy literary scene. His poems and articles were published in The New Republic, The Nation, Scribner's Magazine, and later The New Yorker and Esquire.

In 1937, partly convinced by Hemingway, Shipman, whose marriage had failed, decided to devote himself to the Loyalist cause in the Spanish Civil War. He first drove ambulances and led American volunteers for the Lincoln Brigade from France into Spain across the Pyrenees, and then saw action as an infantryman in the battles of Jarama and Brunete, being badly wounded at Brunete. He carried shrapnel fragments in his leg until his death.

Shipman returned to the United States in 1938 and found work as a columnist of the New York Morning Telegraph, but soon after America's entry into World War II in 1941, he enlisted with the U.S. Army and became a war correspondent. He was sergeant major of the 16th Armored Division's 16th Regiment, and was also with the 787th Tank Battalion until its deactivation in 1945.

After the end of World War II, Shipman returned to journalism and eventually became a featured columnist of the Morning Telegraph. He was also a recognized expert on thoroughbred and harness racing and a columnist of the Daily Racing Form. He died of cancer on June 24, 1957, in New York Hospital, and was buried in Gilkey Cemetery in Plainfield, New Hampshire. The Evan Shipman Handicap at Belmont Park was later named for him.

=== Personal ===
While living in the United States, Shipman married Elizabeth Gerwig of Pittsburgh in 1934. The union was troubled by alcoholism, and Elizabeth, who became insane, was confined to an asylum, while Shipman went back to Paris in 1937.

== Works ==
- Free For All (New York: Scribner's, 1935), a novel about harness racing (trotters)
- "Mazeppa" (1936), a poem which likens women to flowers, partly based on his wife
- The Racing Memoirs of John Hertz as told to Evan Shipman (Chicago, Privately Printed, 1954), non-fiction

== Literary allusions ==
Evan Shipman is mentioned in Death in the Afternoon (1932), Hemingway's account of Spanish bullfighting, as a fellow admirer of a certain half-bred racehorse, a steeplechaser, named Uncas. "Uncas, when he won a classic steeplechase race at Auteuil at odds of better than ten to one, carrying my money on him, I felt profound affection for. But if you should ask me what eventually happened to this animal that I was so fond of that Evan Shipman and I were nearly moved to tears when speaking of the noble beast, I would have to answer that I do not know." Hemingway went on to portray his friend at greater length in the section of A Moveable Feast (1964) titled "Evan Shipman at the Lilas".
