= The Creeper (film) =

1948 film by Jean Yarbrough

- Directed by: Jean Yarbrough
- Written by: Maurice Tombragel
- Based on: An original story idea by Don Martin
- Produced by: Bernard Small
- Starring: Eduardo Ciannelli; Onslow Stevens; June Vincent; Ralph Morgan
- Cinematography: George Robinson
- Edited by: Saul A. Goodkind
- Production companies: Reliance Pictures, Inc.
- Distributed by: Twentieth Century-Fox Film Corp.
- Release date: September 1948
- Running time: 64 minutes
- Country: United States
- Language: English

The Creeper is a 1948 American horror film directed by Jean Yarbrough. The film stars Onslow Stevens as a mad doctor whose serum turns a man into a catlike killer.

== Plot ==
Two scientists on an expedition to the West Indies discover a serum which changes humans into cats, or, more precisely, into catlike killers. One believes they should continue with their experiments and the other does not, the disagreement costing the latter his life. Several deaths occur before the first scientist is halted in his mad plans.

== Cast ==
- Eduardo Ciannelli as Dr. Van Glock
- Onslow Stevens as Dr. Borden
- June Vincent as Gwen Runstrom
- Ralph Morgan as Dr. Lester Cavigny
- Janis Wilson as Nora Cavigny
- John Baragrey as Dr. John Reade
- Richard Lane as Inspector Fenwick
- Philip Ahn as Ah Wong
- Lotte Stein as Nurse
- Ralph Peters as Porter
- David Hoffman as Andre Dussaud

== Production ==
Between 1947 and 1951, Hollywood studios made almost no horror films with The Creeper being an exception. It was developed under the working title The Cat Man and was in production from the beginning of March 1948 to the middle of the month.

== Release ==
The Creeper was distributed theatrically by Twentieth Century-Fox Film Corp. in September 1948. According to a March 1949 Hollywood Reporter article, radio writer Joseph Ruscoll sued Edward Small for using the title of Ruscoll's radio show, The Creeper for the film. The suit was settled for an undisclosed sum.

== Reception ==
In a contemporary review, Dorothy Masters of New York Daily News described The Creeper as an effort "wasted in every phase, including story, performance and general production ... To further the bafflement, perfectly innocent people are given sinister mien. Three murders and a couple of near-misses don't improve the tale."
