= Lucile Watson =

Canadian actress (1879–1962)

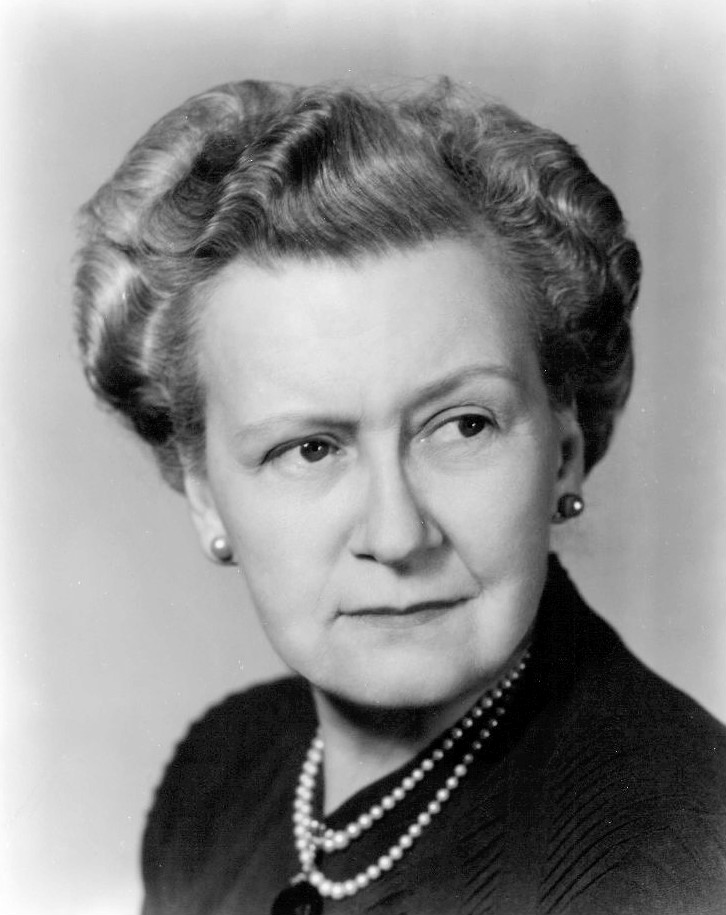
- Watson in 1953
- Born: May 27, 1879; Quebec City, Quebec, Canada
- Died: June 24, 1962 (aged 83); New York City, U.S.
- Occupation: Actress
- Years active: 1902–1954
- Spouses: Rockliffe Fellowes (1903-?) divorced; Louis Evan Shipman (?-1933) died

Lucile Watson (May 27, 1879 – June 24, 1962) was a Canadian stage and film actress, long based in the United States. She was "famous for her roles of formidable dowagers." She had a long and prosperous career, primarily on Broadway, with some notable film roles. She was married to fellow Canadian actor Rockliffe Fellowes whom she introduced to acting.

== Biography ==
Watson was born in Quebec and raised in Ottawa, the daughter of an officer in the British Army. Despite his wishes, she traveled to New York City and studied at the American Academy of Dramatic Arts.

In 1903, she married Rockliffe Fellowes of Ottawa and the couple moved to New York City to pursue her acting career. With her encouragement, Fellowes also took up acting and became a successful actor.

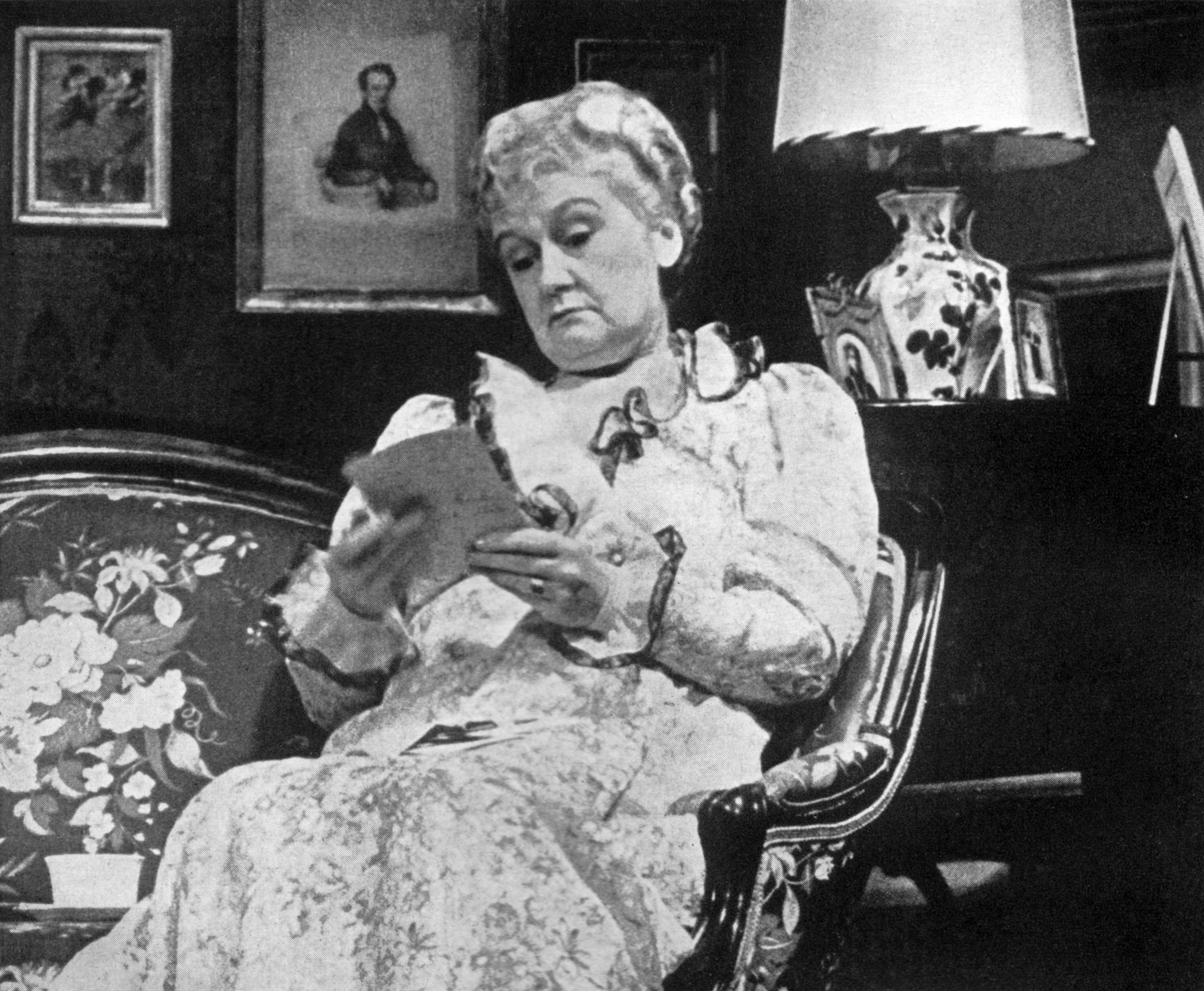
Watson as Fanny Farrelly in the original Broadway production of Watch on the Rhine, 1941

Watson was primarily a stage actress, appearing in 39 Broadway plays.

In perhaps her most acclaimed performance, Watson portrayed Fanny Farrelly in playwright Lillian Hellman's antifascist dramatic stage play Watch on the Rhine on Broadway in 1941. Two years later in Hollywood, she and her co-star Paul Lukas reprised their stage roles in the film adaptation, for which Watson received a nomination for the Academy Award for Best Supporting Actress.

Watson and Fellowes divorced some time before 1928 and did not have any children. Watson married Louis Evan Shipman, who died in 1933. Fellowes died in 1950.Watson died on June 24, 1962.

== Broadway roles ==
- His Bridal Night (1916) as Julie
- No More Ladies (1934) as Mrs. Fanny Townsend
- Watch on the Rhine (1941) as Fanny Farrelly
- The Bat (1953) as Cornelia Van Gorder

== Partial filmography ==
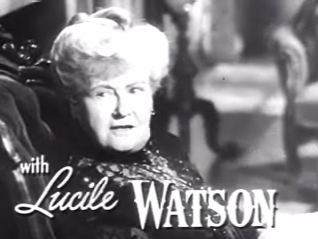
Watson in the movie trailer My Forbidden Past (1951)

- The Royal Family of Broadway (1930) as Actress Backstage (uncredited)
- What Every Woman Knows (1934) as La Contessa la Brierre
- The Bishop Misbehaves (1935) as Lady Emily
- The Garden of Allah (1936) as Mother Superior Josephine
- A Woman Rebels (1936) as Betty Bumble
- Three Smart Girls (1936) as Martha
- The Young in Heart (1938) as Mrs. Jennings
- Sweethearts (1938) as Mrs. Marlowe
- Made for Each Other (1939) as Mrs. Harriet Mason
- The Women (1939) as Mrs. Morehead
- Waterloo Bridge (1940) as Lady Margaret Cronin
- Florian (1940) as Countess
- Mr. & Mrs. Smith (1941) as Mrs. Custer
- Rage in Heaven (1941) as Mrs. Monrell
- Footsteps in the Dark (1941) as Mrs. Archer
- The Great Lie (1941) as Aunt Ada
- Model Wife (1941) as J.J. Benson
- Watch on the Rhine (1943) as Fanny Farrelly
- Uncertain Glory (1944) as Mme. Maret
- Till We Meet Again (1944) as Mother Superior
- The Thin Man Goes Home (1945) as Mrs. Charles
- Tomorrow Is Forever (1946) as Aunt Jessica Hamilton
- My Reputation (1946) as Mrs. Mary Kimball
- Never Say Goodbye (1946) as Mrs. Hamilton
- Song of the South (1946) as Grandmother
- The Razor's Edge (1946) as Louisa Bradley
- Ivy (1947) as Mrs. Gretorex
- The Emperor Waltz (1948) as Princess Bitotska
- Julia Misbehaves (1948) as Mrs. Packett
- That Wonderful Urge (1948) as Aunt Cornelia Farley
- Little Women (1949) as Aunt March
- Everybody Does It (1949) as Mrs. Blair
- Let's Dance (1950) as Serena Everett
- Harriet Craig (1950) as Celia Fenwick
- My Forbidden Past (1951) as Aunt Eula Beaurevel

== Sources ==
- Lucile Watson biography by Film historian T. R. Bourgeois
