= The Strange Love of Martha Ivers =

1946 film

- Theatrical release poster
- Directed by: Lewis Milestone (Note: Director Byron Haskin temporarily took over directorial duties while Lewis Milestone joined a Hollywood strike, though he is not credited. Producer Hal B. Wallis also reshot some sequences with Milestone's approval.)
- Written by: Robert Rossen (Note: In addition to Rossen, Robert Riskin served as an uncredited cowriter.)
- Based on: "Love Lies Bleeding" by John Patrick
- Produced by: Hal B. Wallis
- Starring: Barbara Stanwyck; Van Heflin; Lizabeth Scott; Kirk Douglas; Judith Anderson
- Cinematography: Victor Milner
- Edited by: Archie Marshek
- Music by: Miklós Rózsa
- Production company: Hal Wallis Productions
- Distributed by: Paramount Pictures
- Release dates: June 13, 1946 (London); July 25, 1946 (NYC)
- Running time: 116 minutes
- Country: United States
- Language: English
- Box office: $3.25 million (US rentals)

The Strange Love of Martha Ivers is a 1946 American noir tragedy film starring Barbara Stanwyck, Van Heflin, and Lizabeth Scott, with Kirk Douglas appearing in his film debut. It was directed by Lewis Milestone based on a screenplay by Robert Rossen, adapted from the short story "Love Lies Bleeding" by playwright John Patrick.

The film premiered in London in June 1946, before opening in New York City on July 25, 1946. It received largely favorable reviews from critics, and received an Academy Award nomination for Best Writing, Original Motion Picture Story.

In 1974, the film entered the public domain in the United States because the claimants did not renew its copyright registration in the 28th year after publication.

The Strange Love of Martha Ivers (1946)

== Plot ==
On a rainy night in 1928 in the Pennsylvania factory town of Iverstown, thirteen-year-old Martha Ivers tries to run away from her wealthy aunt and guardian, Mrs. Ivers, with her street-smart friend, Sam Masterson. She is caught and taken home. Seeking to ingratiate his son with Mrs. Ivers, Martha's tutor, Walter O'Neil Sr., presents timid Walter Jr., as the one responsible for Martha's capture. Walter privately tells Martha that despite what his father said, he was not the one who put authorities on her track, and would never betray her. Scolded by her aunt, Martha defiantly states her name is not Ivers, but Smith, her father's name.

During a power failure, Sam comes for her, but Martha's aunt hears her calling to him from downstairs. While Sam slips out unnoticed, Mrs. Ivers starts beating Martha's kitten with her cane. Martha wrestles the cane away from her aunt and strikes her across the head, causing her to fall down the stairs, accidentally killing her. When the power comes back on, Martha lies about the incident to Walter Sr. Even though Walter Jr. saw everything, he backs her up. The greedy Walter Sr. makes it clear to both Walter Jr. and Martha that he knows what happened but that as long as he and his son stand to benefit, he will play along. Sam leaves town.

Seventeen years later, in 1946, Walter Sr. is dead, and Walter Jr. is married to Martha and Iverstown's district attorney. He loves her, but she goes through lovers while plowing herself into expanding the Ivers empire tenfold.

Sam has become a professional gambler, and recently a heavily decorated soldier uninterested in accolades. He stumbles into Iverstown by chance and, after an accident, leaves his car to be repaired. While waiting, he goes to his old home, now a boarding house. He meets Antonia "Toni" Marachek, who has missed her bus. They spend the night in adjoining rooms in a hotel. She is later picked up for violating her probation by not immediately returning to her hometown. Sam asks Walter to use his influence to get Toni released.

Walter is convinced Sam is there for blackmail. When Martha reacts joyfully to seeing Sam, a jealous Walter forces Toni to set him up for a beating. Dumped out of town, he is too tough to be intimidated. Confronted by Sam, Walter makes a half-hearted attempt to kill him but is easily disarmed. Walter inadvertently blurts out his fears of blackmail, only to learn that Sam had not witnessed the death.

Through old newspapers Sam learns that a former Ivers company employee had been identified as the murderer, convicted, and hanged.

Sam is torn between his old love and his new one with Toni. Although he eventually forgives Toni for betraying him, he and Martha spend an idyllic day together, rekindling old feelings.

Walter gets drunk and arranges to meet Sam for a showdown. Martha finds out about the meeting. When Walter drunkenly falls down the stairs, Martha urges Sam to kill the unconscious man. Sam instead brings Walter around. Martha pulls out a gun and threatens to shoot Sam in "self-defense" as an intruder. Sam tells her it would work if she could get Walter to corroborate her story. Saying he does not believe she will shoot him, Sam turns his back on her and leaves.

Martha drops the gun and Walter picks it up. Though Walter sees she still loves Sam, Martha says she was afraid Walter would leave her. He embraces and kisses her as she tells him it can be just like nothing ever happened. Walter presses the gun against her midriff. She puts her thumb over his finger on the trigger and presses. Outside, Sam hears the shot. He runs toward the mansion and sees Walter holding Martha's body. Walter then shoots himself.

Sam and Toni drive away from Iverstown. Sam indicates he is thinking marriage. Toni concurs.

== Cast ==
- Barbara Stanwyck as Martha Ivers
  - Janis Wilson as young Martha Ivers
- Van Heflin as Sam Masterson
  - Darryl Hickman as young Sam Masterson
- Lizabeth Scott as Antonia "Toni" Marachek
- Kirk Douglas as Walter O'Neil
  - Mickey Kuhn as young Walter O'Neil
- Judith Anderson as Mrs. Ivers
- Roman Bohnen as Mr. O'Neil
- Ann Doran as Bobbi St. John
- Frank Orth as Hotel clerk
- James Flavin as Detective #1
- Charles D. Brown as McCarthy

== Production ==
=== Development ===
The film was adapted from playwright John Patrick's short story "Love Lies Bleeding" by screenwriter Robert Rossen, who had acquired the rights for $35,000.

=== Casting ===
Barbara Stanwyck was cast in the title role, four films after her villainous lead in Billy Wilder's film noir Double Indemnity (1944).

The film marked the screen debut of Kirk Douglas, who was recommended to producer Hal B. Wallis by Humphrey Bogart and Lauren Bacall. The couple suggested that Wallis attend a play which featured Bacall's old drama school classmate, Issur Demsky, who later took the name Kirk Douglas. Douglas later wrote in his autobiography that Van Heflin was very helpful to him in his first time on a film set. In contrast to his later, tougher roles, Douglas plays an alcoholic weakling. According to Tony Thomas, "it assured Douglas his future in films".

Future film director and producer Blake Edwards had an uncredited bit part as a sailor who hitches a ride with Sam.

=== Filming ===
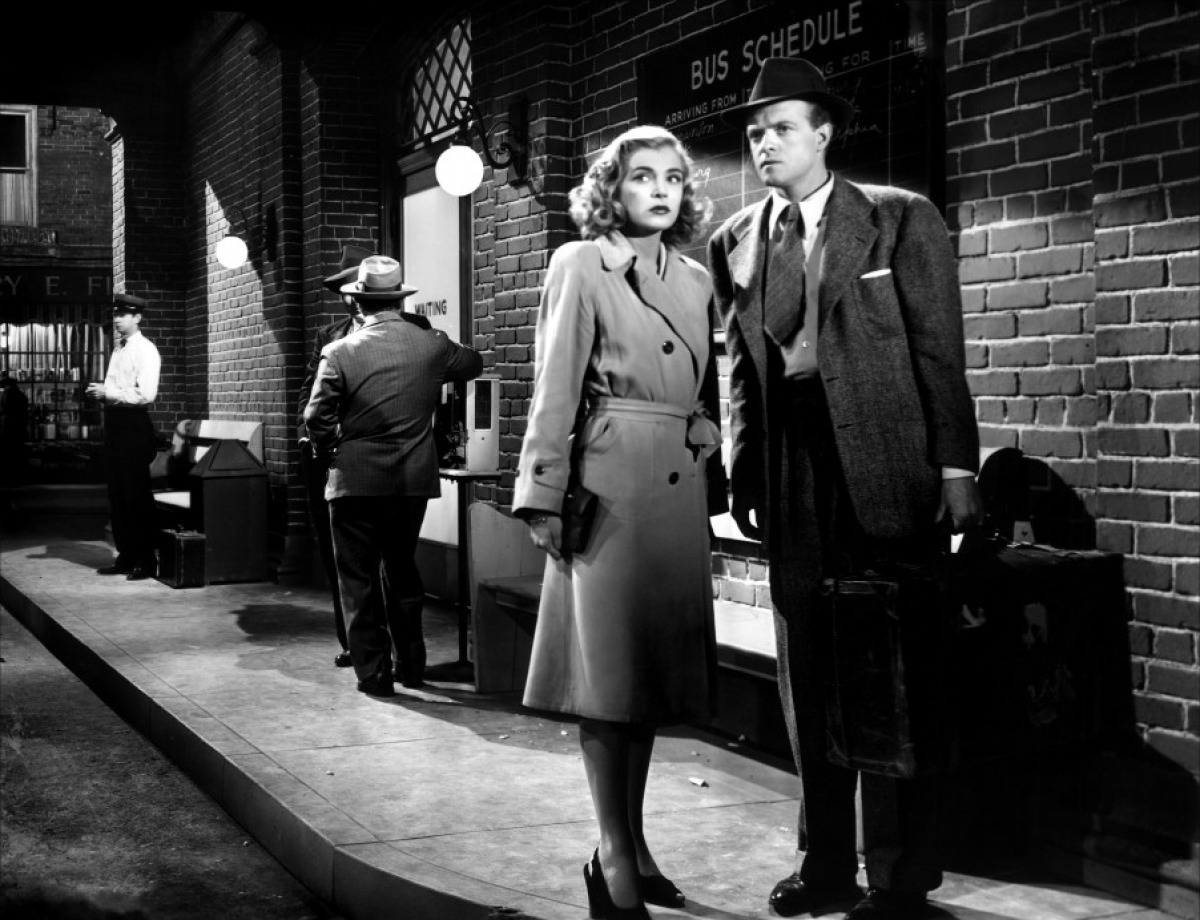
Lizabeth Scott and Van Heflin

Filming took place at Paramount Studios in Los Angeles. Director Lewis Milestone left the film for several days in sympathy with a set decorators' strike which was going on at the time. In his absence, the film was directed by Byron Haskin, who did not receive screen credit. The film's shooting schedule was vigorous, with shoots often lasting 12 hours each day.

Stanwyck had considerable influence on how she was lit, and was not shy about putting her fellow actors on notice that she did not like to be upstaged. When she saw the coin trick Heflin had learned — at Milestone's suggestion, to show that Heflin's character was a professional gambler — she informed him he should make sure he did not do it during any of her important lines, since she had a bit of business that would upstage him, if she had to. With that she raised her skirt high and adjusted her garter. Heflin is seen rolling a coin on his fingers several times in several scenes.

Kirk Douglas later wrote that Stanwyck was indifferent to him at first, until at one point she focused on him and told him, "Hey, you're pretty good." Douglas, smarting from having been ignored previously, replied, "Too late, Miss Stanwyck," but the two got on well after that.

=== Post-production ===
Six months after the film's release, Milestone gave an interview in which he said he would never work for producer Hal B. Wallis again, because Wallis had wanted re-shoots in order to get more closeups of Lizabeth Scott. Milestone refused, telling Wallis to shoot them himself, and, according to the director, Wallis did.

== Release ==
The Strange Love of Martha Ivers premiered in London on June 14, 1946. The audience at the London premiere was reportedly so taken by actress Lizabeth Scott's appearance that they began to mob her before the screening.

The film opened in New York City on July 24, 1946, and its release expanded wide on September 13, 1946.

The film's advertising campaign consisted only of teasers before its release: Newspapers ran advertisements reading, "Whisper her name!", while radio spots had a woman repeatedly whispering, "Martha Ivers".

== Critical response ==
=== Contemporary ===
Herbert Cohn of the Brooklyn Daily Eagle wrote: "It is a complex story, but [director] Milestone used each detail to make his characters seem real, their actions not too far-fetched," and went on to praise the leading performances. John L. Scott of the Los Angeles Times praised the performances as raw and "geared toward the material," and added that the film "is not a pretty tale but it holds the attention down to the last scene."

A review published in The New York Times noted: "reminding one of a jigsaw puzzle, there are long stretches in The Strange Love of Martha Ivers when it seems as though the director, Lewis Milestone, and Robert Rossen, the author, will not be able to gather in all the pieces of the rambling plot. But they manage it expeditiously, if with less finesse and surprise than one could wish."

=== Modern assessment ===
Dave Kehr from Chicago Reader wrote in a 2000 review that the film "is pervaded by [Rossen’s] guilty-liberal fascination with power and money." And continued by saying "Director Lewis Milestone does little more than accent the hysteria of Rossen's script, though his portrait of the company town, bound in factory grime and feudal loyalty, is nicely done."

Glenn Erickson, reviewing the film for DVD Talk in 2002, complimented its psychological complexity, writing: "Many noirs create moods of corruption but Robert Rossen's script for The Strange Love of Martha Ivers gives us characterizations of uncommon depth... [it] isn't a detective movie or a standard crime thriller, which helps support the notion that film noir is a style and not a genre. It's one of the best noirs around."

The film holds a 100% approval rating on Rotten Tomatoes, based on 10 reviews.

== Accolades ==
John Patrick received an Academy Award nomination for Best Writing, Original Motion Picture Story.

== Home media ==
In 1974, The Strange Love of Martha Ivers entered the public domain in the United States because the claimants did not renew its copyright registration in the 28th year after publication. Because of its public domain status, the film has since had numerous home media releases in various formats.

Paramount Home Entertainment released the film on DVD on October 25, 2002. The independent distributor HDClassics issued a restored DVD and Blu-ray combination set in 2012, though this edition was noted for having middling picture quality and featuring digital noise reduction. On September 22, 2022, Kino Lorber released a new Blu-ray edition featuring a 4K restoration from the original film elements.

== See also ==
- List of films in the public domain in the United States
