= William McCormick Blair Estate =

Historic house in Illinois, United States

- U.S. National Register of Historic Places
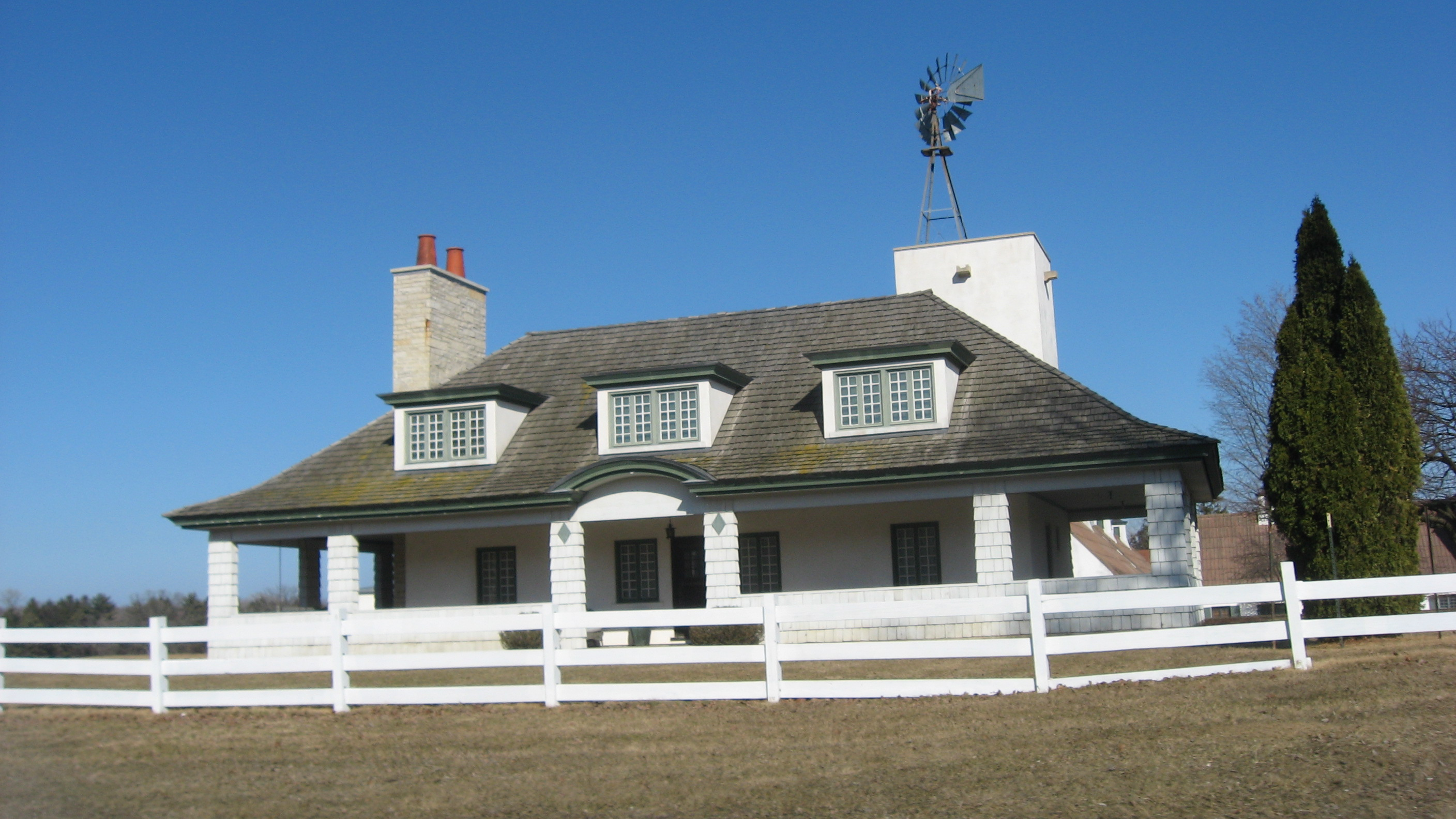

- Location within Chicago metropolitan area Location within Illinois Location within the United States
- Location: 982 Sheridan Rd., Lake Bluff, Illinois
- Coordinates: 42°17′17″N 87°50′45″W
- Area: 9 acres (3.6 ha)
- Built: 1926-28
- Architect: David Adler
- Architectural style: Colonial Revival
- NRHP reference No.: 07001476
- Added to NRHP: January 31, 2008

The William McCormick Blair Estate is a historic estate at 982 Sheridan Road in Lake Bluff, Illinois. The estate was built in 1926-28 for financier William McCormick Blair, who was one of the many wealthy and prominent Chicagoans to build an estate in Lake Bluff in the early twentieth century. Architect David Adler, a well-regarded designer of country houses, designed the estate's main house in the Colonial Revival style. The house has a complex, sprawling shape unified by the consistent use of double-hung windows and wood roofing shingles. The estate also includes a garage, a tennis house, two cottages, two sheds, a folly shaped like a Greek temple, a greenhouse, and a garden. The garden resulted from a collaboration between Adler and Ellen Biddle Shipman.

The estate was added to the National Register of Historic Places on January 31, 2008.

It remains a private residence as of 2025.
