= 1943 New York Film Critics Circle Awards =

9th New York Film Critics Circle Awards

9th New York Film Critics Circle Awards

January ?, 1944
(announced December 28, 1943)

Going My Way

The 9th New York Film Critics Circle Awards, announced on 28 December 1943, honored the best filmmaking of 1943.

== Winners ==
- Best Film:
  - Watch on the Rhine
- Best Actor:
  - Paul Lukas - Watch on the Rhine
- Best Actress:
  - Ida Lupino - The Hard Way
- Best Director:
  - George Stevens - The More the Merrier
- Special Awards:
  - Report from the Aleutians
  - Why We Fight
