= Janis Wilson =

American actress (1930–2003)

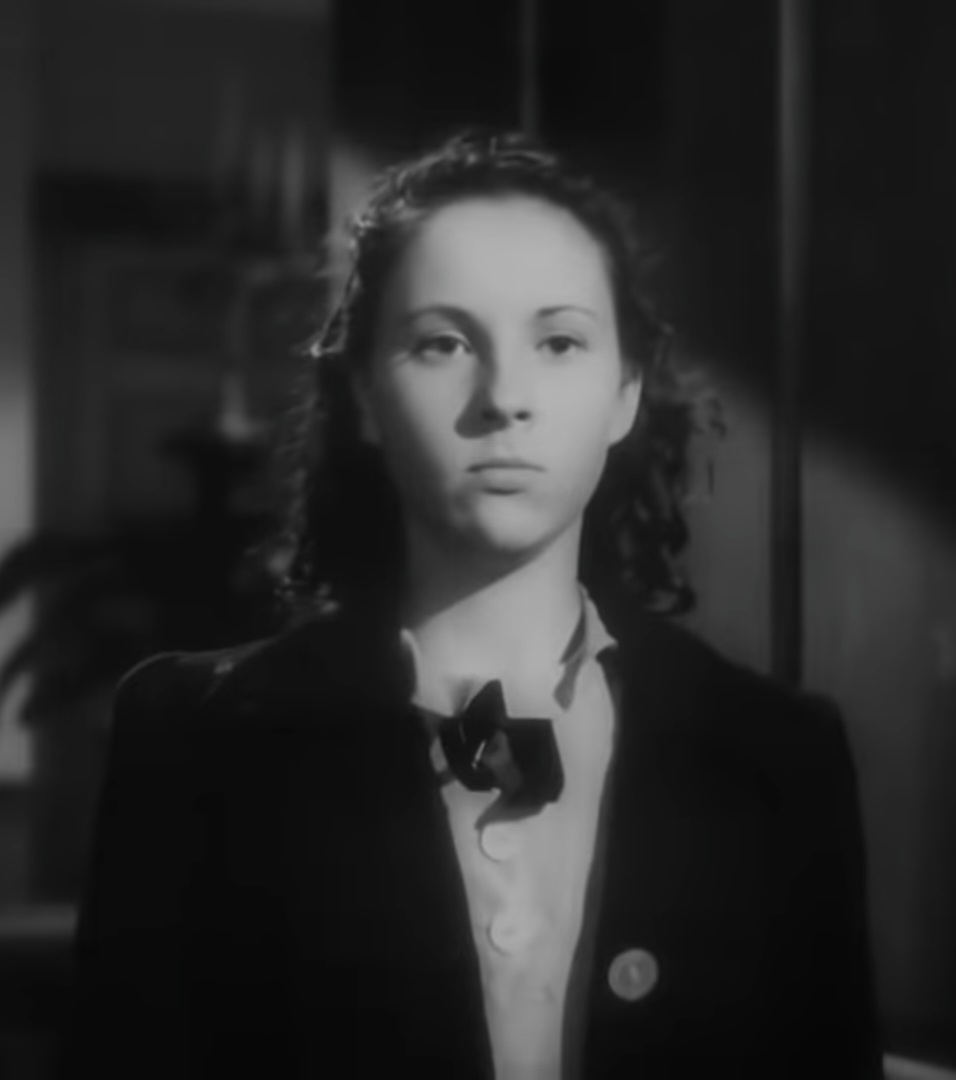
- Wilson in The Strange Love of Martha Ivers (1946)
- Born: Janice Mae Wilson; February 9, 1930; Santa Barbara, California, U.S.
- Died: November 17, 2003 (aged 73); Spokane, Washington, U.S.
- Occupation: Actress
- Years active: 1942–1948
- Spouse: Sidney Victor Petertyl (m. 1955)
- Children: 1

Janis Mae Wilson (February 9, 1930 – November 17, 2003) was an American child actress of the 1940s. She is probably best known for her roles in Now, Voyager and Watch on the Rhine opposite Bette Davis as well as for the films The Strange Love of Martha Ivers and Snafu.

== Career ==
Born in Santa Barbara, California, twelve-year-old Wilson's mother had her dentist put bands on her teeth (Note: Usually used to align and straighten teeth, rather than individual brackets bonded to each tooth, in the 1940's bands were often applied that were made of metal, cemented in place, and entirely surrounded each tooth, furnishing an anchor for wires and attachments. They were sturdy, but were more noticeable than other braces.) in order for her to win her first role as Tina Durrance, a little girl rejected and unloved by her mother, in the 1942 Bette Davis drama Now, Voyager. Warner Bros. considered Wilson a “sensational discovery” and due to her fondness for the young actress, Davis persuaded the studio to cast her as her daughter in her next film Watch on the Rhine. Wilson starred in just five more films before retiring at age 18 after appearing in the 1948 horror film The Creeper.

== Personal life ==
Wilson initially met her future husband Sidney Victor Petertyl on the Warner Bros. lot in 1942 when she was just twelve years old and filming Now, Voyager. They were married in Santa Barbara in 1955 when Wilson was 25. The Petertyls had one son and eventually settled in Grand Rapids, Michigan where they lived for 31 years. The family later moved to Spokane, Washington in 1994. In 1996, Wilson stated that she was working on a book about her years as a child actress in Hollywood and her special relationship with Bette Davis. Wilson died of a stroke in Spokane on November 17, 2003.

== Filmography (selection) ==
- Now, Voyager (1942) as Tina Durrance (uncredited)
- Watch on the Rhine (1943) as Babette
- Snafu (1945) as Kate Hereford
- My Reputation (1946) as Penny Boardman
- The Strange Love of Martha Ivers (1946) as Martha (as a child)
- Heading for Heaven (1947) as Janie Elkins
- The Creeper (1948) as Nora Cavigny
