= Edgewood (Stanleytown, Virginia) =

Historic house in Virginia, United States

- U.S. National Register of Historic Places
- Virginia Landmarks Register
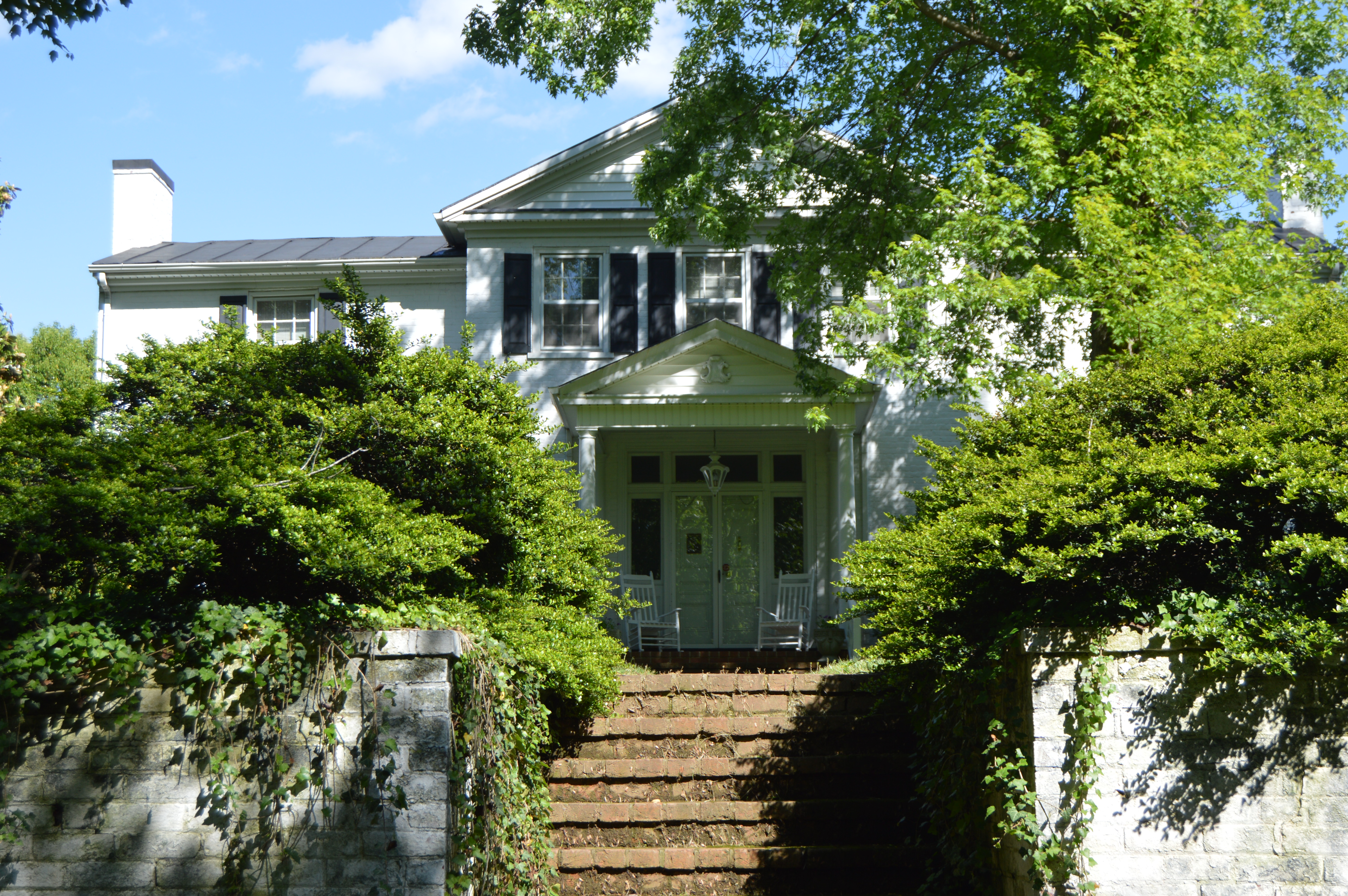
- Entrance from Old Stage Road

- Location within Virginia Location within the United States
- Location: 150 Old Stage Rd., Stanleytown, Virginia
- Coordinates: 36°44′19″N 79°57′4″W
- Area: 8.3 acres (3.4 ha)
- Built: c. 1830
- Architect: William Roy Wallace (1951–1953 renovation)
- Architectural style: Greek Revival
- NRHP reference No.: 07000231
- VLR No.: 044-5172

Significant dates
- Added to NRHP: March 29, 2007
- Designated VLR: December 16, 2006

Edgewood is a historic home located at Stanleytown in Henry County, Virginia, United States. It was built about 1830, and consists of a projecting two-story, three-bay, pedimented, Greek-temple-form central mass and two-story flanking wings, in the Greek Revival style. The house features three semi-integral end chimneys, and a one-story front porch.

It was listed on the National Register of Historic Places in 2007.

== Description ==
Edgewood is an 1830s-constructed manor house which follows a Palladian-style three-part form that is uncommon in Henry County, Virginia. At the time of its construction, Neoclassical architecture such as Edgewood's Greek Revival styling would have been unknown to most people in the area. Edgewood remains a rarity in the region as a brick house of both significant age and size.

The three-bay, pedimented central portion is flanked by two wings. These three elements are all two stories tall, with the central portion slightly taller than the wings. The exterior walls are laid in Flemish bond brick 15 in (38 cm) thick, with the flanks possessing brick cornices and the central portion a wooden cornice. Molding surrounds the windows and doors, and symmetrical paterae corner blocks are present. Each wing is topped by a gable roof done in standing seam tin.

The home originally had a T shape, with the first floor featuring a foyer and three rooms and the second floor possessing a staircase landing and three rooms. The interior walls are mostly brick 12 in (30 cm) thick and, like the ceilings, are covered in plaster. The house's six fireplaces were finished with wooden surrounds and mantles in a Greek Revival style based on Asher Benjamin. The wood floors, presumably made of chestnut, remain in good condition.

There are three end chimneys and a one-story, north-facing front porch. A major renovation of the whole house designed by the architect William Roy Wallace took place from 1951 to 1953. It turned the back porch into a sunroom featuring skylights, and reduced the original front porch (once longer and reaching two stories) to a shorter one-story format. The 1950s renovations also saw the dirt cellar converted into a concrete basement. The house's brick foundation was simultaneously reinforced by including concrete retaining walls in the basement, measuring 22 in (56 cm) by 20 in (51 cm).

The 1950s renovations added several new elements to the home. Among them was the introduction of bathrooms and closets, with two full baths and seven closets in total. A garage was constructed in 1951, with a "maid's room" atop it. This garage was adjoined to the house with a kitchen/laundry room addition. These renovations also introduced a forced hot water heating system. Further renovations in the 1990s saw the kitchen remodeled, marble added to both the foyer and fireplace surrounds, and the attached garage converted into an all-purpose room. A free-standing garage, which is not a contributing element of Edgewood's National Register of Historic Places (NRHP) listing, was completed in 2003.

== History ==
Edgewood was constructed in the 1830s for John Redd, a wealthy businessman who had fought at the Battle of Yorktown and attained the rank of major. Redd had acquired the plot on Old Stage Road (known in the 18th century as Great Wagon Road and the Carolina Stage Road) in Stanleytown, Virginia in 1784. That road was the artery for traffic through Henry County from Salem, Virginia, to Salem, North Carolina. Redd himself is thought to have owned the home until c. 1840, and the property remained in his family until 1878.

The businessmen brothers J. B. and W. B. Dillon owned Edgewood and adjoining areas as part of a 14.5-acre (5.9 ha) property from 1944 to 1946. Edgewood was purchased in 1946 by Leslie Faudree – a physician who practiced in the area – and his wife. In 1951, the couple hired the restoration architect William Roy Wallace to renovate the home. Wallace's plans for Edgewood, in a preliminary version and a final version, survived in a bookcase installed during the work, which was completed in 1953. After her husband died, Mrs. Faudree remained in the home until she sold it in 1992.

The structure stood vacant from 2001 until 2003, when Sam and Carolyn Davis acquired it. They renovated the house and nominated it for inclusion on the NRHP and the Virginia Landmarks Register (VLR). It was named to the VLR in December 2006 and named to the NRHP in March 2007.
