= Watch on the Rhine (play) =

1941 American play by Lillian Hellman

- First edition 1941
- Original language: English
- Written by: Lillian Hellman
- Genre: Drama
- Setting: The living room of the Farrelly country house, about 20 miles from Washington, D.C., in late spring 1940

Premiere
- Date: April 1, 1941
- Place: Martin Beck Theatre, New York City, New York

Watch on the Rhine is a 1941 American play by Lillian Hellman. In an essay on World War II, a contributor to The Companion to Southern Literature (2002) wrote that the play's "peculiar combination of drawing-room comedy in a genteel southern home with sinister corruption of the Nazi regime in Europe made for a unique and powerful drama, one strong enough to win the New York Drama Critics' Circle Award."

== Plot ==
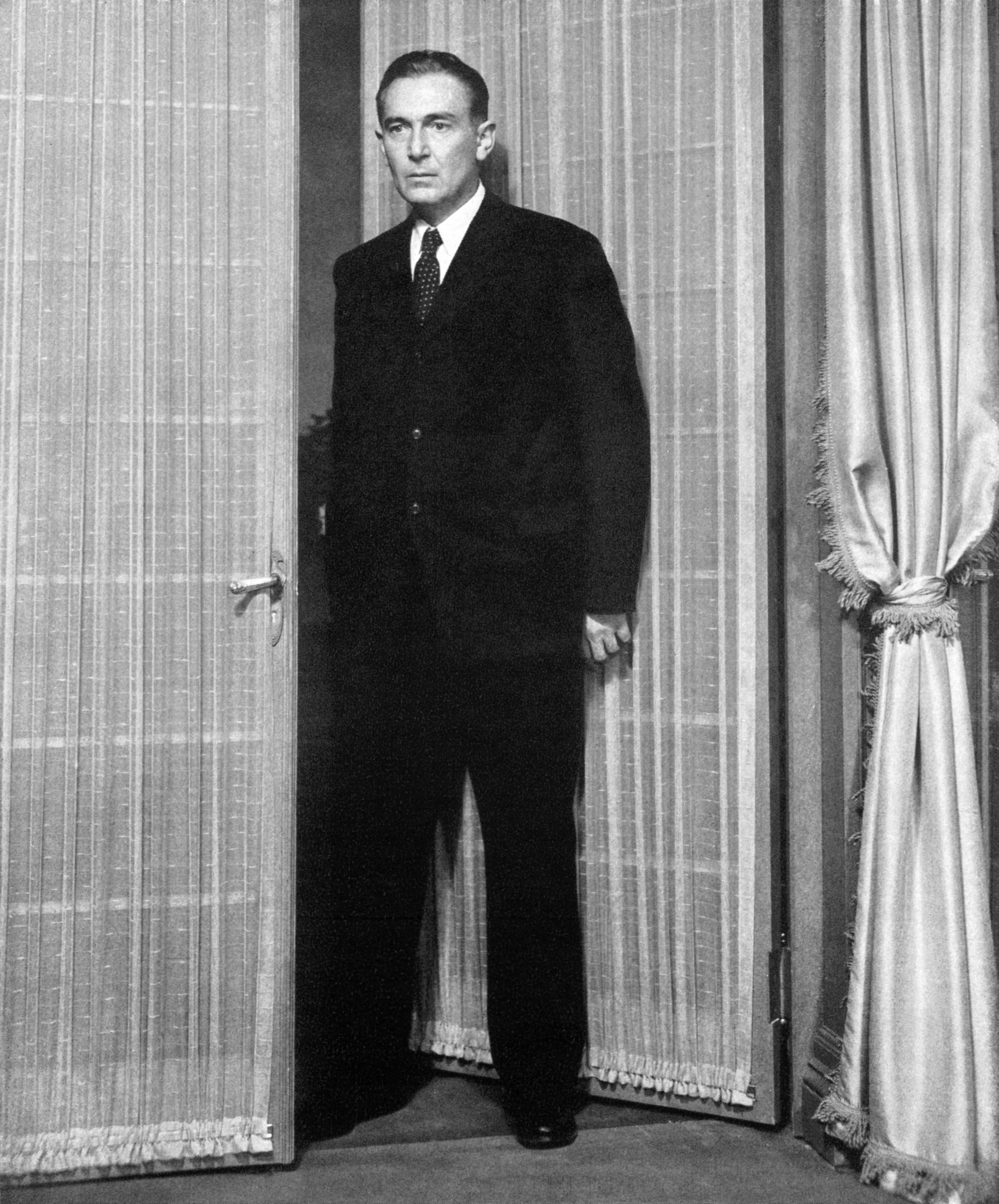
Paul Lukas as Kurt Mueller in the original Broadway production of Watch on the Rhine (1941)

It is 1940, in late spring. For the past 17 years, the German-born engineer Kurt Mueller and Sara, his American wife of 20 years, have lived modestly in Europe and raised three children. He has been deeply involved in anti-Fascist activities in Spain and Germany. The Muellers and their children Joshua, Babette, and Bodo are visiting Sara's wealthy relatives, the Farrellys, her brother David, and mother Fanny, in Washington, D.C. Sara tells the Farrellys she and her family hope to live peacefully in the U.S.

The Farrellys have another houseguest, Teck de Brancovis, an impoverished Romanian count "with good manners and odious character" who has been conspiring with the Germans while living in Washington. He searches the Muellers' bedroom and in a locked suitcase discovers a gun and $23,000 intended to finance underground operations in Germany.

The Muellers learn that Max Freidank, a member of the resistance, has been arrested in Germany. Because Freidank once rescued Kurt from the Gestapo, Kurt plans to return to Germany to assist Max and those arrested with him.

Teck threatens to expose Kurt's plans to the Nazis unless they pay him $10,000 to keep silent. Kurt kills Teck. David and Fanny agree to help him escape capture by the American police. The play ends with Kurt saying goodbye to his wife and children and voicing his hope that they'll all be reunited someday in a freer, better Germany.

== Background ==
Hellman wrote Watch on the Rhine in 1940, following the Nazi-Soviet Non-Aggression Pact of August 1939. The play's call for a united international alliance against Hitler directly contradicted the Communist position at the time. Its title comes from a German patriotic song, "Die Wacht am Rhein".

== Production ==
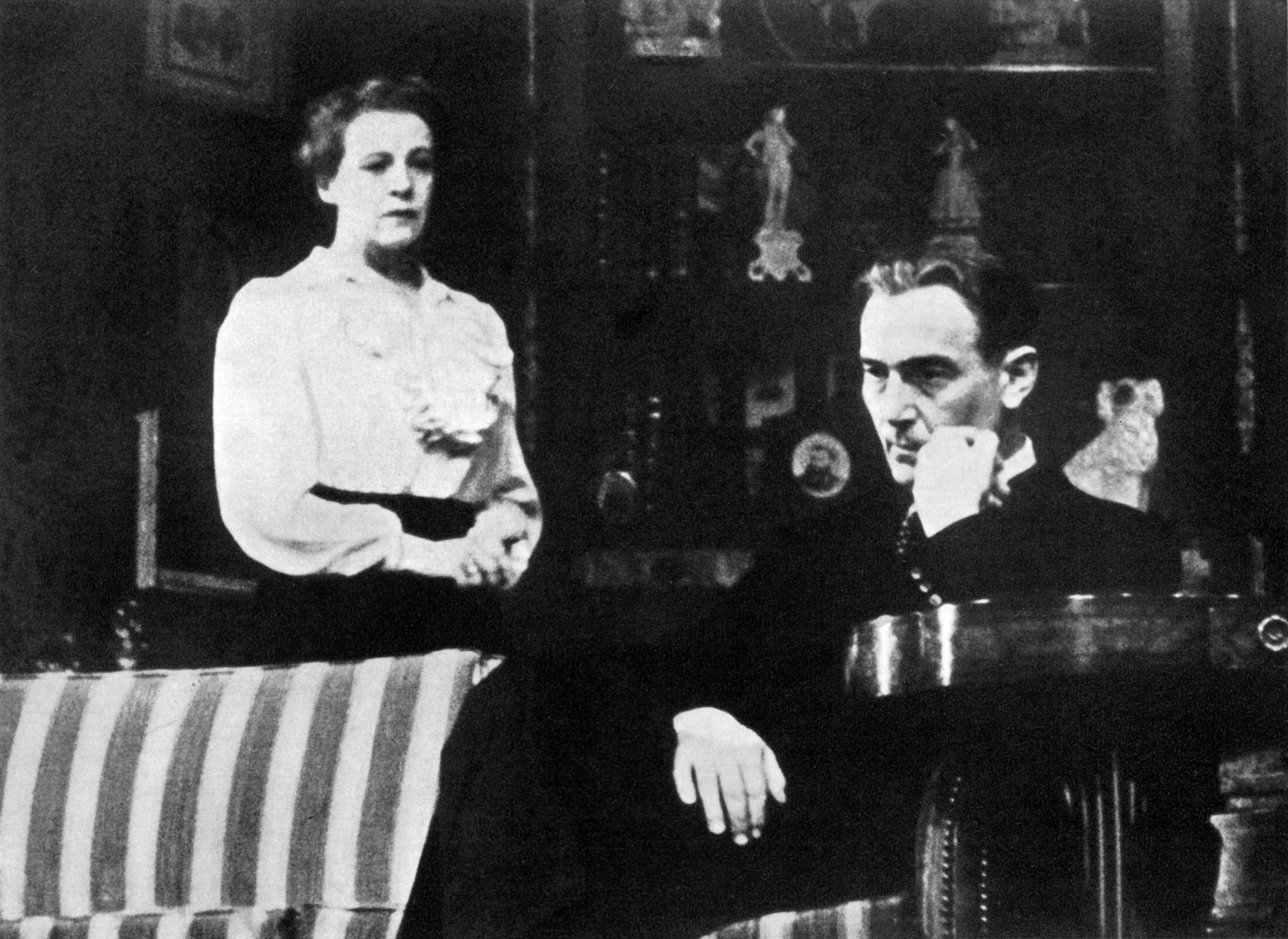
Mady Christians and Paul Lukas in the Broadway production of Watch on the Rhine

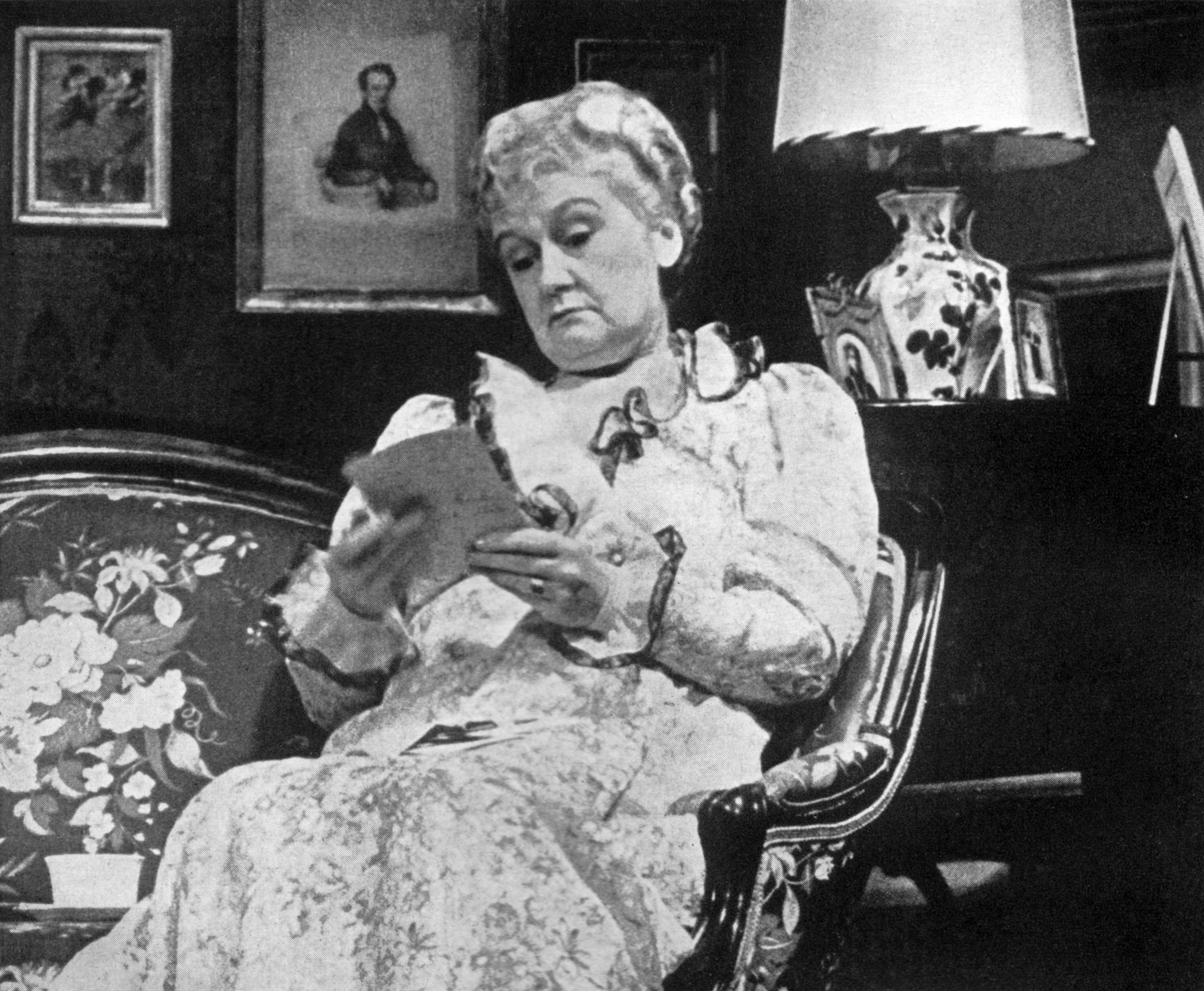
Lucile Watson in the Broadway production of Watch on the Rhine

Produced and directed by Herman Shumlin, Watch on the Rhine premiered on Broadway at the Martin Beck Theatre on April 1, 1941, and ran for 378 performances, closing February 21, 1942. Scenic design for the three-act drama was by Jo Mielziner; costumes were designed by Helene Pons; Paul Bowles composed the incidental music.

=== Cast ===
- Eda Heinemann as Anise
- Lucile Watson as Fanny Farrelly
- Frank Wilson as Joseph
- John Lodge as David Farrelly
- Helen Trenholme as Marthe de Brancovis
- George Coulouris as Teck de Brancovis
- Mady Christians as Sara Mueller
- Peter Fernandez as Joshua Mueller
- Eric Roberts as Bodo Mueller
- Ann Blyth as Babette Mueller
- Paul Lukas as Kurt Mueller

Hellman accompanied the production to Washington, D.C., for a command performance at the National Theatre on January 25, 1942, that celebrated President Franklin D. Roosevelt's birthday.

=== London production ===
Emlyn Williams directed the London production of Watch on the Rhine, which ran for 674 performances (April 22, 1942 – December 4, 1943) at the Aldwych Theatre. The cast included Anton Walbrook (Kurt Mueller), Diana Wynyard (Sara Mueller) and Athene Seyler (Fanny Farrelly).

== Reception ==
In The New York Times, Brooks Atkinson wrote:

Lillian Hellman has brought the awful truth close to home. She has translated the death struggle between ideas in familiar terms we are bound to respect and understand. Curious how much better she has done it than anybody else by forgetting the headlines and by avoiding the obvious approaches to the great news subject of today.... It is a play of pith and moment and the theatre may be proud of it.

It is a well-rounded play, full of flavor and good people and the characters control its destinies. For Miss Hellman never preaches. She has given fascism a terrible appearance without introducing a uniform or a party salute. Being primarily interested in people, she has shown how deeply fascism penetrates into the hearts and minds of human beings.

Atkinson thought it not as well structured as her earlier plays, The Children's Hour and The Little Foxes, but termed it "the finest thing she has written."

Five months later Atkinson provided another assessment of the cast, calling it "a performance that breeds vast respect for the theatre as a mature form of expression." He noted some problematic scenes but called his own comments "pedantic reservations" and praised the work again:

Miss Hellman's contrasting of guileless and good-humored life in America with the bitterness and corruption of life in modern Europe is keenly perceptive. It has a special meaning for us today. But, since Miss Hellman has communicated her thoughts dramatically in terms of articulate human beings, Watch on the Rhine ought to be full of meaning a quarter of a century from now when people are beginning to wonder what life was like in America when the Nazi evil began to creep across the sea.

Life magazine called Watch on the Rhine "the most eloquent" of the many anti-Nazi plays found on Broadway in recent years. The Communist New Masses faulted Hellman's vague depiction of fascism while praising "the sincerity of purpose of a dramatist who possesses potentialities far beyond the grasp of any other writer on the contemporary theater scene." The Nation said the play "avoid[s] the flat didacticism and the thinness of characterization usually so evident in thesis plays."

== Accolades ==
In April 1941, Watch on the Rhine received the New York Drama Critics' Circle Award for the Best American Play of the season.

== Publication history ==
Watch on the Rhine was published by Random House in 1941. It was also collected in Hellman's Four Plays (1942).

== Adaptations ==
Dashiell Hammett wrote the screenplay for a 1943 film version in which Lukas reprised his role opposite Bette Davis. Watson and Coulouris also reprised their roles from the original production.

== Additional sources ==
- Vivian M. Patraka, "Realism, Gender, and Historical Crisis," in Spectacular Suffering: Theatre, Fascism, and the Holocaust (Indiana University Press, 1999)
