= Louis Evan Shipman =

American playwright and novelist

D'Arcy of the Guards (1899)

Louis Evan Shipman (1869–1933) was an American playwright and newspaperman.

Louis Evan Shipman was born in Brooklyn, New York, on August 2, 1869. He wrote editorials for Leslie's Weekly in 1895 and 1896 and edited Life from 1922 to 1924. He also wrote for Collier's Weekly. His plays included Fools Errant and Poor Richard. His books included The Curious Courtship of Kate Poins, D'Arcy of the Guards, Urban Dialogues, Predicaments, and The Quality of Youth, published in 1904. He was married to the noted landscape architect, Ellen Biddle Shipman until they divorced in 1910 and was married to actress Lucile Watson until his death in 1933.

During World War I he was a member of the New Hampshire state committee for public safety (Committee of One Hundred), was the state director of the so-called "Four Minute Men", and was a local food administrator.

Louis Shipman lived in Plainfield, New Hampshire, for 25 years, but later settled in France. He was made a Chevalier of the Legion of Honour of France in 1930. He died aged 64 at his home in Boury-en-Vexin, Oise Department, France, on August 2, 1933, after an intestinal illness of five months. He was survived by two daughters and one son, Evan Shipman.

== See also ==
- Ellen Biddle Shipman
- Evan Shipman
