= Snafu (film) =

1945 film by Jack Moss

- Directed by: Jack Moss
- Screenplay by: Louis Solomon; Harold Buchman
- Based on: Snafu by: Louis Solomon; Harold Buchman
- Produced by: Jack Moss
- Starring: Robert Benchley; Barbara Jo Allen; Conrad Janis; Nanette Parks; Janis Wilson; Jimmy Lloyd; Enid Markey
- Cinematography: Franz Planer
- Edited by: Gene Havlick
- Music by: Paul Sawtell
- Production company: Columbia Pictures
- Distributed by: Columbia Pictures
- Release date: November 22, 1945
- Running time: 82 minutes
- Country: United States
- Language: English

Snafu is a 1945 American comedy film directed by Jack Moss and written by Louis Solomon and Harold Buchman. It is based on the 1944 play Snafu by Louis Solomon and Harold Buchman. The film stars Robert Benchley, Barbara Jo Allen, Conrad Janis, Nanette Parks, Janis Wilson, Jimmy Lloyd and Enid Markey. The film was released on November 22, 1945, by Columbia Pictures.

== Cast ==
- Robert Benchley as Ben Stevens
- Barbara Jo Allen as Madge Stevens
- Conrad Janis as Ronald Stevens
- Nanette Parks as Laura Jessup
- Janis Wilson as Kate Hereford
- Jimmy Lloyd as Danny Baker
- Enid Markey as Aunt Emily Andrews
- Eva Puig as Josephina
- Ray Mayer as Detective
- Marcia Mae Jones as Martha
- Winfield Smith as Col. West
- John Souther as Taylor
- Byron Foulger as Phil Ford
- Kathleen Howard as Dean Garrett
