= Robert M. Hanes House =

Historic house in North Carolina, United States

- Ralph Hanes House
- U.S. National Register of Historic Places
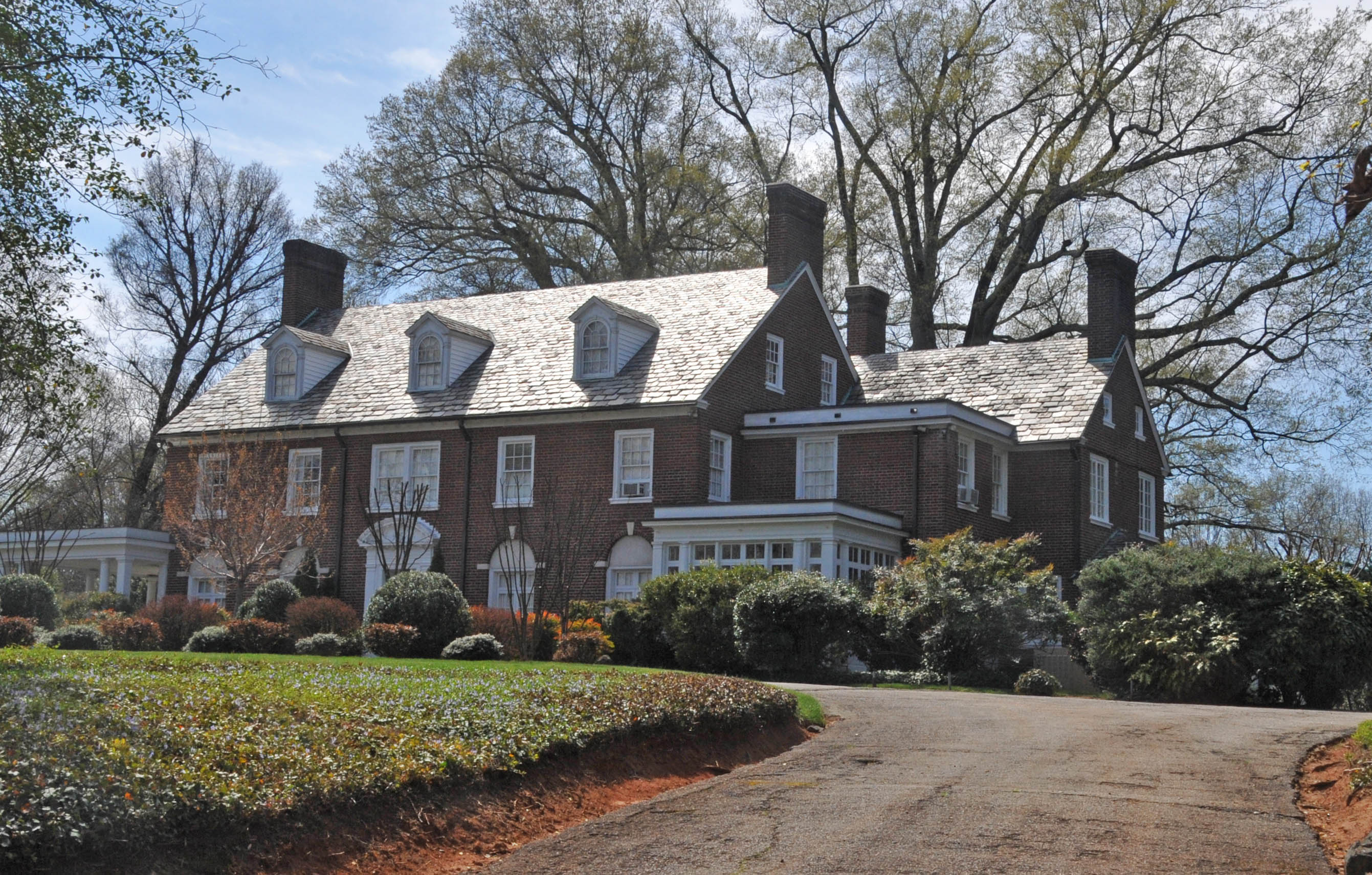

- Location within North Carolina Location within the United States
- Location: 140 N. Stratford Rd., Winston-Salem, North Carolina
- Coordinates: 36°5′54″N 80°16′38″W
- Area: 2.48 acres (1.00 ha)
- Built: 1926–1927, 1936–1937
- Architect: Charles Barton Keen; Ellen Biddle Shipman
- Architectural style: Georgian Revival
- NRHP reference No.: 12000573
- Added to NRHP: August 28, 2012

Robert M. Hanes House is a historic home located at Winston-Salem, Forsyth County, North Carolina. It was built in 1927, and is a 2 1/2-story, five-bay, Georgian Revival-style brick dwelling. It has a side-gable roof with dormers, recessed entrance, and a one-story porch with Tuscan order columns. It is set in a landscape designed by Ellen Biddle Shipman in 1937. Also on the property is a contributing garage (1926–1927), playhouse (c. 1936), and garden house. It was built for Ralph Hanes and his wife, Dewitt Chatham Hanes.

It was listed on the National Register of Historic Places in 2012.
