= Now, Voyager =

1942 American drama film directed by Irving Rapper

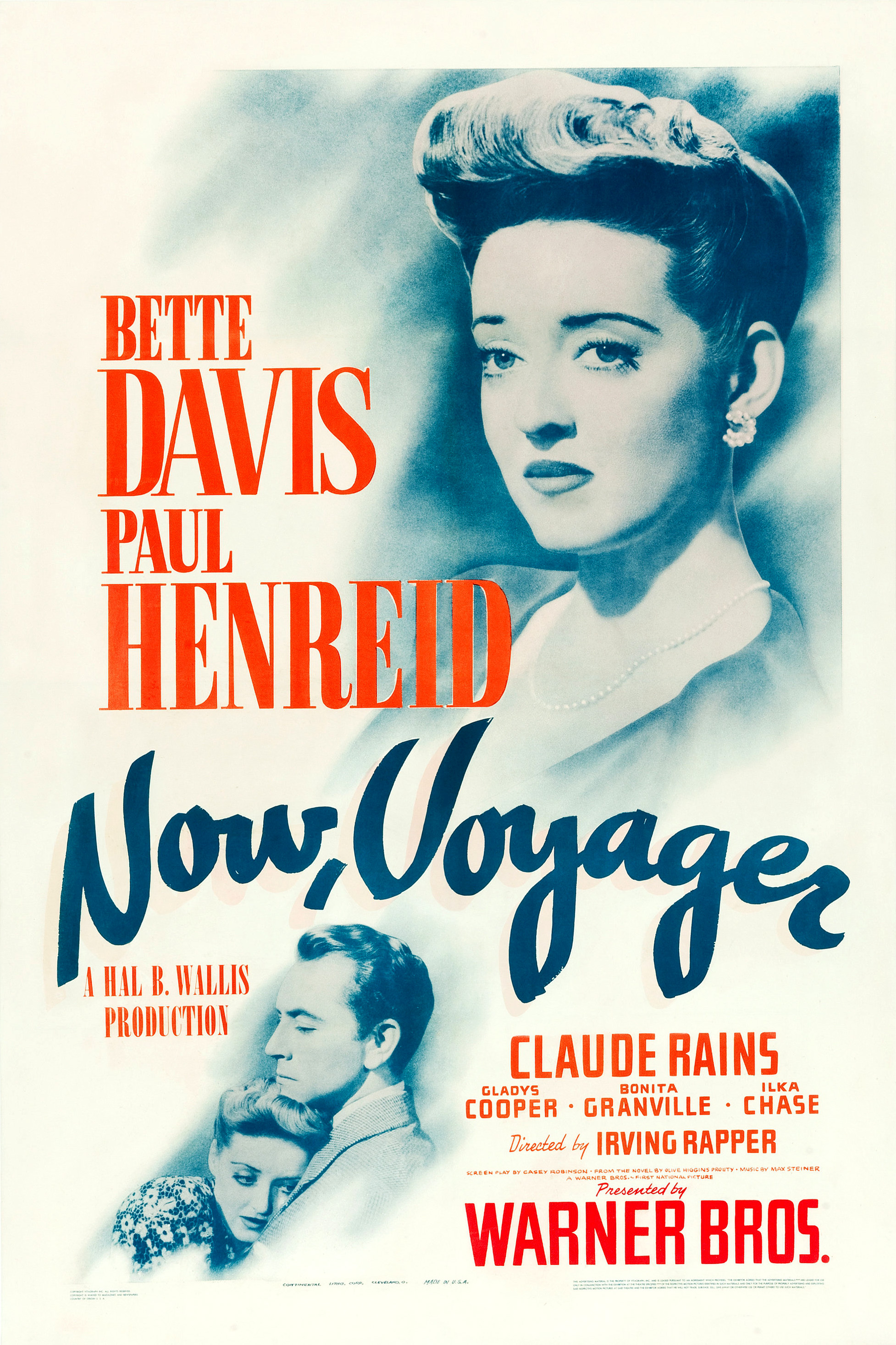
- Theatrical release poster
- Directed by: Irving Rapper
- Screenplay by: Casey Robinson
- Based on: Now, Voyager; 1941 novel Olive Higgins Prouty
- Produced by: Hal B. Wallis
- Starring: Bette Davis; Paul Henreid; Claude Rains; Gladys Cooper
- Cinematography: Sol Polito
- Edited by: Warren Low
- Music by: Max Steiner
- Distributed by: Warner Bros. Pictures
- Release dates: October 22, 1942 (New York City); October 31, 1942 (USA)
- Running time: 117 minutes
- Country: United States
- Language: English
- Budget: $877,000
- Box office: $4,177,000 ($77.7 million in 2025 dollars)

Now, Voyager is a 1942 American drama film starring Bette Davis, Paul Henreid, and Claude Rains, and directed by Irving Rapper. The screenplay by Casey Robinson is based on the 1941 novel of the same name by Olive Higgins Prouty. Prouty borrowed her title from the Walt Whitman poem "The Untold Want," which reads in its entirety,

The untold want by life and land ne'er granted,
Now, voyager, sail thou forth, to seek and find.

In 2007, Now, Voyager was selected for preservation in the United States National Film Registry by the Library of Congress as being "culturally, historically, or aesthetically significant." The film ranks number 23 on AFI's 100 Years ... 100 Passions, a list of the top love stories in American cinema. Film critic Steven Jay Schneider suggests the film continues to be remembered for not only its star power, but also the "emotional crescendos" engendered in the storyline.

== Plot ==
Charlotte Vale is a drab, quiet, overweight, neurotic woman whose life is brutally dominated by her mother, an aristocratic Boston dowager whose verbal and emotional abuse of her daughter has contributed to Charlotte's complete lack of self-confidence. Mrs. Vale had already brought up three sons, and Charlotte was an unwanted child born to her late in life. Fearing that Charlotte is on the verge of a nervous breakdown, her sister-in-law Lisa introduces her to psychiatrist Dr. Jaquith, who recommends that Charlotte spend time in his sanitarium. She reveals to him an early romance she enjoyed with a ship's radio officer, which her mother discovered and thwarted, describing her own defiance at the time as the proudest moment of her life.

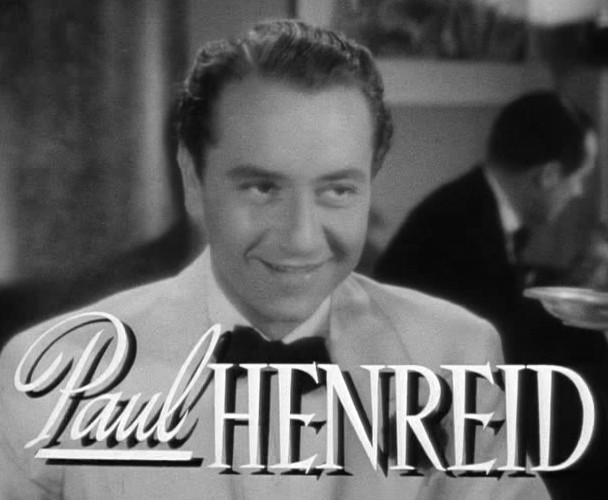
From the trailer

Away from her mother's control, Charlotte blossoms, and at Lisa's urging, the now-slim, transformed woman with a chic borrowed wardrobe—encouraged by Jaquith—goes on a cruise arranged by Lisa instead of going home immediately. Initially, Charlotte is too shy to mix with the other passengers on the ship. On an excursion, Charlotte is asked to share a carriage ride with Jeremiah Duvaux Durrance, a married man traveling on business, who asks Charlotte to help select presents for his female relatives. She obliges, and they become friendly, with Jerry discussing his young daughter Tina's shyness. Charlotte shows him a picture of her family, with herself appearing as “the fat lady with the heavy brows and all the hair” before her transformation. Jerry is sympathetic to her fledgling and frail confidence, expressing his admiration for her. Jerry runs into his friends, Deb and Frank McIntyre, and introduces Charlotte to them. From them, Charlotte learns how Jerry's devotion to his young daughter Tina keeps him from divorcing his wife, a manipulative, jealous woman who does not love Tina and hinders Jerry's chosen career of architecture.

On an excursion from the ship in Rio de Janeiro, Charlotte and Jerry are stranded on Sugarloaf Mountain when their car crashes. Spending the night together while their driver goes for help, Jerry and Charlotte cuddle for warmth. They miss the ship and spend five days together before Charlotte flies to Buenos Aires to rejoin the cruise. Although they have fallen in love, they decide it would be best not to see each other again.

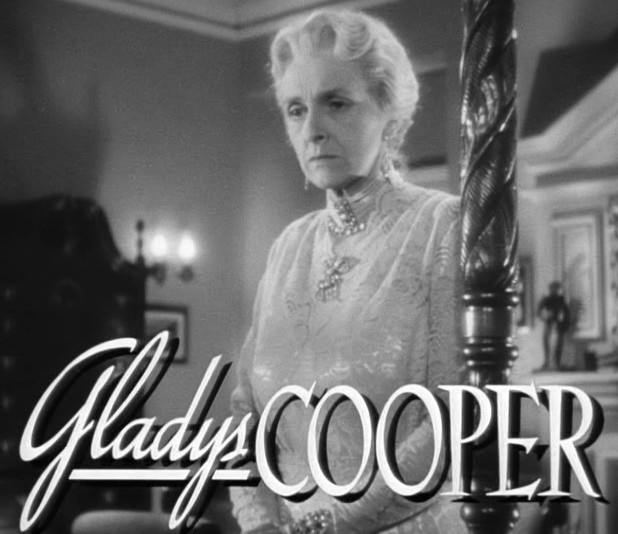
From the trailer

When she disembarks from the ship, Charlotte's family is stunned by the dramatic changes in her appearance and demeanor. The formerly shy Charlotte had become popular among the passengers. At home, her mother is determined to subjugate her daughter once again, however Charlotte is resolved to remain independent. The memory of Jerry's love and devotion — as evidenced in the timely arrival of a corsage of camellias — helps give her the strength she needs to remain resolute.

Charlotte becomes engaged to wealthy, well-connected widower Elliot Livingston, but by chance she again encounters Jerry at a party for an acquaintance, who is his client. Though Jerry congratulates her, Charlotte realizes she does not love Elliot enough and subsequently breaks the engagement. During a quarrel with her mother over the broken engagement, Charlotte says she did not ask to be born, that her mother never wanted her, and it has "been a calamity on both sides." Mrs. Vale has a heart attack and dies. Guilty and distraught, Charlotte returns to the sanitarium.

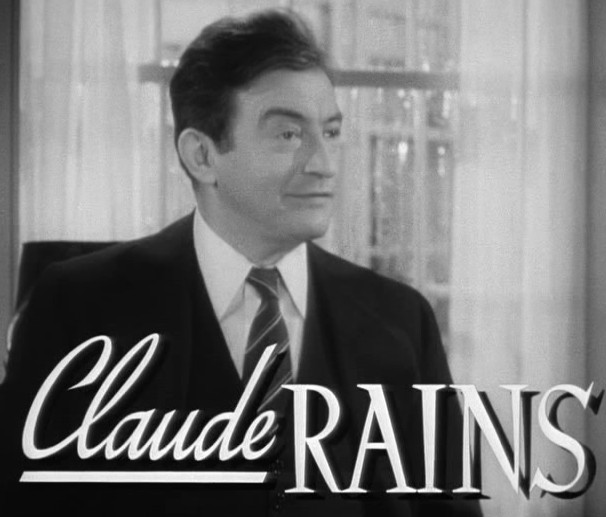
From the trailer

Charlotte is immediately diverted from her problems when she meets Jerry's 12-year-old daughter, Tina, who has been sent to Dr. Jaquith by her father on Charlotte's recommendation. Tina greatly reminds Charlotte of herself – both were unwanted and unloved by their mothers. Shaken from her depression, Charlotte becomes interested in Tina's welfare, and with Dr. Jaquith's permission, Charlotte takes her under her wing. When the girl improves, Charlotte takes her home to Boston.

Jerry and Dr. Jaquith visit the Vale home to discuss a project — a new psychiatric wing donated by Charlotte, for which Jerry will be the architect. He is delighted to see the change in his daughter. Dr. Jaquith has allowed Charlotte to keep Tina there, provided her relationship with Jerry remains platonic. Charlotte tells Jerry she sees Tina as his gift to her and her way of being close to him. When Jerry asks her if she is happy, she replies: "Oh, Jerry, don't let's ask for the moon. We have the stars."

== Cast ==
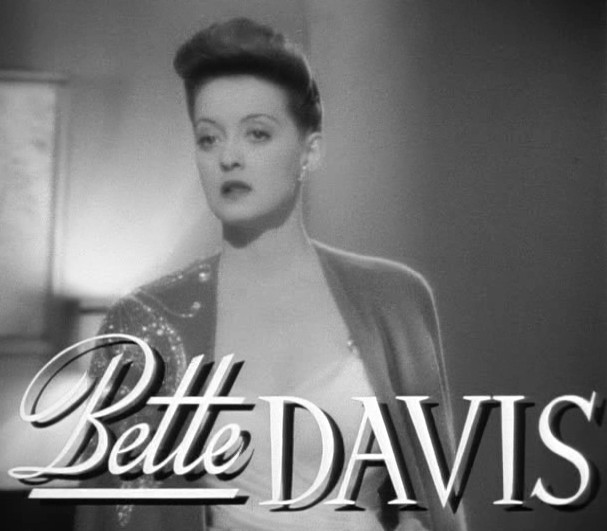
From the trailer

- Bette Davis as Charlotte Vale
- Paul Henreid as Jeremiah "Jerry" Duvaux Durrance
- Claude Rains as Dr. Jaquith
- Gladys Cooper as Mrs. Henry Windle Vale
- Bonita Granville as June Vale
- John Loder as Elliot Livingston
- Ilka Chase as Lisa Vale
- Lee Patrick as "Deb" McIntyre
- Franklin Pangborn as Mr. Thompson
- Katharine Alexander as Miss Trask (as Katherine Alexander)
- James Rennie as Frank McIntyre
- Mary Wickes as Nurse Dora Pickford
- Janis Wilson as "Tina" Durrance (uncredited)

== Production ==
Filming ran from April 7 to June 23 of 1942 as producer Hal B. Wallis made Now, Voyager his first independent production at Warner Bros. under a new arrangement with the studio. He took an active role in the production, including casting decisions. The initial choices for Charlotte were Irene Dunne, Norma Shearer, and Ginger Rogers. When Bette Davis learned about the project, she campaigned for and won the role. More than any other of her previous films, Davis became absorbed in the role, not only reading the original novel, but also becoming involved in details such as choosing her wardrobe personally. Consulting with designer Orry-Kelly, she suggested a drab outfit, including an ugly foulard dress for Charlotte initially, to contrast with the stylish, "timeless" creations that mark her later appearance on the cruise ship.

Throughout the film, Henreid uses the familiarity of sharing a cigarette, with the famous two-cigarette scene, being used as his introduction to a lonely woman.

The choice of Davis's leading men became important, as well. Davis was aghast at the initial costume and makeup tests of Austrian actor Paul Henreid, who later worked on Casablanca that same year; she thought the "slicked back" gigolo-like appearance made him look "just like Valentino." Henreid was similarly uncomfortable with the brilliantine image, and when Davis insisted on another screen test with a more natural hairstyle, he was finally accepted as the choice for her screen lover. In her 1987 memoir, This 'N That, Davis revealed that co-star Claude Rains (with whom she also shared the screen in Juarez, Mr. Skeffington, and Deception) was her favorite co-star. She remained close friends with both Henreid and Rains for the rest of her life.

Initial production of the Prouty novel had to take into account that European locales would not be possible in the midst of World War II, despite the novelist's insistence on using Italy as the main setting. Prouty's quirky demands for vibrant colors and flashbacks shot in black and white with subtitles were similarly disregarded. Principal photography was shifted to Warner's sound stage 18 and various locations around California, including the San Bernardino National Forest, while European scenes were replaced by stock footage of Brazil. One of the primary reasons for Davis being interested in the original project was that photography would also take place in her hometown of Boston. Other locations of filming include Harvard Medical School in Roxbury, Massachusetts, Laguna Beach, Whitley Avenue, and other streets around Boston.

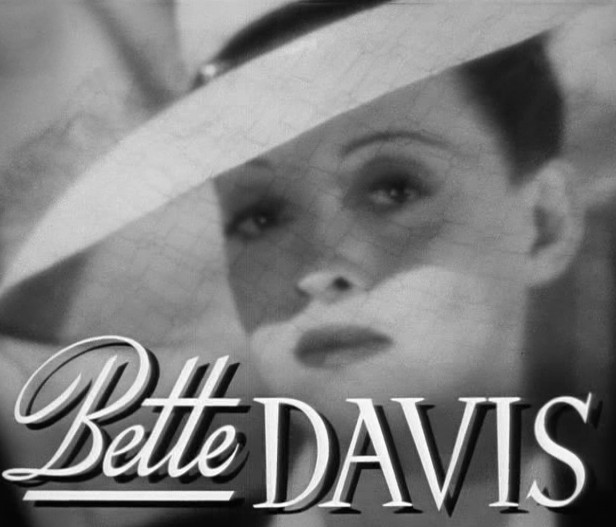
From the trailer

The film highlighted Davis's ability to shape her future artistic ventures. Not only did she have a significant role in influencing the decisions over her co-stars, but also the choice of director was predicated on a need to have a compliant individual at the helm. Davis previously had worked with Irving Rapper on films where he served as a dialogue director, but his gratitude for her support turned into a grudging realization that Davis could control the film. Although his approach was conciliatory, the to-and-fro with Davis slowed production and "he would go home evenings angry and exhausted". The dailies, however, showed a "surprisingly effective" Davis at the top of her form.

For years, Davis and co-star Paul Henreid claimed the moment in which Jerry puts two cigarettes in his mouth, lights both, then passes one to Charlotte, was developed by them during rehearsals, inspired by a habit Henreid shared with his wife, but drafts of Casey Robinson's script on file at the University of Southern California indicate it was included by the screenwriter in his original script. The scene remained an indelible trademark that Davis would later exploit as "hers". The scene has a similar precedent 10 years earlier, between Davis herself and George Brent in The Rich Are Always with Us.

== Box office ==
According to Warner Bros. records, the film earned $2,130,000 domestically and $2,047,000 foreign.

== Critical reception ==
Theodore Strauss, a critic for The New York Times, observed:

Casey Robinson has created a deliberate and workmanlike script, which more than once reaches into troubled emotions. Director Irving Rapper has screened it with frequent effectiveness. But either because of the Hays office or its own spurious logic, [the film] endlessly complicates an essentially simple theme. For all its emotional hair-splitting, it fails to resolve its problems as truthfully as it pretends. In fact, a little more truth would have made the film a good deal shorter ... Although Now, Voyager starts out bravely, it ends exactly where it started – and after two lachrymose hours.

David Lardner of The New Yorker offered a similar opinion, writing that for most of the film, Davis "just plods along with the plot, which is longish and a little out of proportion to its intellectual content." Variety, however, wrote a more positive review, calling it

the kind of drama that maintains Warner's pattern for box-office success ... Hal Wallis hasn't spared the purse-strings on this production. It has all the earmarks of money spent wisely. Irving Rapper's direction has made the picture move along briskly, and the cast, down to the most remote performer, has contributed grade A portrayals.

Harrison's Reports called the film "intelligently directed" and praised Davis' performance as "outstanding", but warned that the film's "slow-paced action and its none-too-cheerful atmosphere make it hardly suitable entertainment for the masses."

Leslie Halliwell wrote in Halliwell's Film Guide: "A basically soggy script gets by, and how, through the romantic magic of its stars, who were all at their best; and suffering in mink went over very big in wartime."

On the review aggregator website Rotten Tomatoes, 91% of 34 critics' reviews are positive. The website's consensus reads: "Now, Voyager is a Hollywood swooner with Bette Davis and Paul Henreid in a melodrama to end all melomers."

== Awards and nominations ==
Award	Category	Nominee(s)	Result	Ref.
Academy Awards	Best Actress	Bette Davis	Nominated	
Academy Awards	Best Supporting Actress	Gladys Cooper	Nominated	
Academy Awards	Best Scoring of a Dramatic or Comedy Picture	Max Steiner	Won	
National Film Preservation Board	National Film Registry		Inducted	

== Source material ==
Olive Higgins Prouty's novel, written in 1941, served as the basis for the film, and other than certain limitations imposed by World War II on the locations for filming, the movie remains fairly true to the novel.

The novel is considered to be one of the first, if not the first, fictional depictions of psychotherapy, which is depicted fairly realistically for the time, as Prouty herself spent time in a sanitarium following a mental breakdown in 1925. This was caused by the death of one of her daughters and proved to be a defining period in her professional life as a writer, as the experience she gained from this episode helped her write not only Now, Voyager, but also her 1927 novel Conflict, both of which have similar themes of recovery following a breakdown. Prouty also used this experience to help others in her life who were experiencing mental health issues, including her close friend Sylvia Plath, who was supported both financially and emotionally by Prouty following a suicide attempt in 1953.

The novel is the third in a pentalogy centered on the fictional Vale family, and by far the most popular. The other titles are The White Fawn (1931), Lisa Vale (1938), Home Port (1947), and Fabia (1951). The other novels in the series do not feature mental health as centrally as Now, Voyager, but themes and certain elements appear throughout. Many characters appear in multiple novels.

The film was also featured in the 1971 film "Summer of '42" when the principal characters in the film go see the movie in a theatre that summer, erroneously so, as the film had not yet been released. It debuted in theaters in October, 1942.

== Home media ==
Now, Voyager was released on DVD and Blu-Ray November 26, 2019 (under license from Warner Bros.) by the Criterion Collection, with a previous DVD release from Warner Bros on August 29, 2006.

== Sources ==
- Davis, Bette with Michael Herskowitz. This 'N That. New York: G.P Putnam's Sons, 1987. ISBN 0399132465
- Leaming, Barbara. Bette Davis: A Biography. New York: Simon & Schuster, 1992. ISBN 0671709550
- Higham, Charles. Bette: The Life of Bette Davis. New York: Dell Publishing, 1981. ISBN 0440106621
- Moseley, Roy. Bette Davis: An Intimate Memoir. New York: Donald I. Fine, 1990. ISBN 1556112181
- Quirk, Lawrence J. Fasten Your Seat Belts: The Passionate Life of Bette Davis. New York: William Morrow and Company, 1990. ISBN 0688084273
- Schneider, Steven Jay. 1001 Movies You Must See Before You Die. Hauppauge, New York: Barron's Educational Series, 2005. ISBN 0764159070
- Spada, James. More Than a Woman: An Intimate Biography of Bette Davis. New York: Bantam Books, 1993. ISBN 0553095129
