= List of television stations in Virginia =

This is a list of broadcast television stations that are licensed in the U.S. state of Virginia.

== Full-power ==
- Stations are arranged by media market served and channel position.

Full-power television stations in Virginia
Media market	Station	Channel	Primary affiliation(s)	Notes	Refs
Charlottesville	WCAV	19	CBS, Fox on 27.1		
Charlottesville	WVIR-TV	29	NBC, The CW on 29.3		
Charlottesville	WHTJ	41	PBS		
Charlottesville	WNVC	41	PBS	(Note: Licensed to Culpeper, Virginia.) (Note: Satellite of WNVT.)	
Harrisonburg	WHSV-TV	3	ABC, NBC on 3.2, CBS on 3.5		
Harrisonburg	WVPT	51	PBS	(Note: Licensed to Staunton, Virginia.)	
Norfolk	WTKR	3	CBS		
Norfolk	WAVY-TV	10	NBC	(Note: Licensed to Portsmouth, Virginia.)	
Norfolk	WVEC	13	ABC	(Note: Licensed to Hampton, Virginia.)	
Norfolk	WHRO-TV	15	PBS		
Norfolk	WTPC-TV	21	TBN	(Note: Licensed to Virginia Beach, Virginia.)	
Norfolk	WGNT	27	Independent		
Norfolk	WTVZ-TV	33	MyNetworkTV		
Norfolk	WVBT	43	Fox, The CW on 43.2		
Norfolk	WPXV-TV	49	Ion Television		
Richmond	WTVR-TV	6	CBS		
Richmond	WRIC-TV	8	ABC	(Note: Licensed to Petersburg, Virginia.)	
Richmond	WWBT	12	NBC		
Richmond	WCVE-TV	23	PBS		
Richmond	WNVT	23	PBS	(Note: Licensed to Spotsylvania Courthouse, Virginia.)	
Richmond	WRLH-TV	35	Fox, MyNetworkTV and Roar on 35.2		
Richmond	WCVW	57	PBS		
Richmond	WUPV	65	The CW	(Note: Licensed to Ashland, Virginia.)	
Roanoke–Lynchburg	WDBJ	7	CBS		
Roanoke–Lynchburg	WSLS-TV	10	NBC		
Roanoke–Lynchburg	WSET-TV	13	ABC	(Note: Licensed to Lynchburg, Virginia.)	
Roanoke–Lynchburg	WBRA-TV	15	PBS		
Roanoke–Lynchburg	WWCW	21	The CW, Fox on 21.2		
Roanoke–Lynchburg	WZBJ	24	MyNetworkTV	(Note: Licensed to Danville, Virginia.)	
Roanoke–Lynchburg	WFXR	27	Fox, The CW on 27.2		
Roanoke–Lynchburg	WPXR-TV	38	Ion Television		
~Johnson City, TN	WCYB-TV	5	NBC, The CW on 5.2	(Note: Licensed to Bristol, Virginia.)	
~Johnson City, TN	WLFG	68	Independent	(Note: Licensed to Grundy, Virginia.)	
~Washington, D.C.	WFDC-DT	14	Univision, UniMás on 14.4	(Note: Licensed to Arlington, Virginia.)	
~Washington, D.C.	WVPY	51	PBS	(Note: Licensed to Front Royal, Virginia.) (Note: Satellite of WVPT.)	
~Washington, D.C.	WPXW-TV	66	Ion Television	(Note: Licensed to Manassas, Virginia.)	

== Digital-only ==
- PBS Appalachia Virginia – Tri-Cities, TN–VA (PBS)

== Low-power ==
Low-power television stations in Virginia
Media market	Station	Channel	Primary affiliation(s)	Notes	Refs
Charlottesville	WVAW-LD	16	ABC		
Harrisonburg	WSVW-LD	30	NBC, The CW on 30.3		
Harrisonburg	WSVF-CD	43	Fox, CBS on 43.2		
Norfolk	WGBS-LD	7	Infomercials	(Note: Licensed to Carrollton, Virginia.)	
Norfolk	W26EV-D	14	HSN		
Norfolk	WYSJ-CD	19	Various	(Note: Licensed to Yorktown, Virginia.)	
Norfolk	WMTO-LD	22	[Blank]		
Norfolk	WVAD-LD	25	Daystar	(Note: Licensed to Chesapeake, Virginia.)	
Norfolk	WJHJ-LD	34	Quest	(Note: Licensed to Newport News, Virginia.)	
Norfolk	WJGN-CD	38	Various		
Norfolk	W15DO-D	44	[Blank]		
Richmond	WWBK-LD	28	Various		
Richmond	WFWG-LD	30	Various		
Richmond	WZTD-LD	45	Telemundo		
Richmond	WRID-LD	48	Daystar		
Richmond	WUDW-LD	53	Various		
Roanoke–Lynchburg	WMDV-LD	23	Independent		
Roanoke–Lynchburg	WZBJ-CD	24	MyNetworkTV		
Roanoke–Lynchburg	W32EW-D	32	HSN		
Roanoke–Lynchburg	WYAT-LD	40	Various	(Note: Licensed to Martinsville, Virginia.)	
~Washington, D.C.	WDCN-LD	6	The Country Network, audio-only on 87.7 FM	(Note: Licensed to Fairfax, Virginia.)	
~Washington, D.C.	WDCO-CD	10	Roar	(Note: Licensed to Woodstock, Virginia.)	
~Washington, D.C.	WDWA-LD	23	Daystar	(Note: Licensed to Damascus, Virginia.)	

== Translators ==
Translator television stations in Virginia
Media market	Station	Channel	Translating	Notes	Refs
Charlottesville	W13DV-D	13	WBPI-CD	(Note: Licensed to Crozet, Virginia.)	
Charlottesville	WAHU-LD	31	WCAV; WVAW-LD		
Charlottesville	WVIR-CD	29	WVIR-TV		
Eastern Shore	W25AA-D	3.11; 10.11; 13.11; 15.11	WTKR; WAVY-TV; WVEC; WHRO-TV	(Note: Licensed to Onancock, Virginia.)	
Eastern Shore	W18EG-D	3.12; 10.12; 13.12; 15.12	WTKR; WAVY-TV; WVEC; WHRO-TV		
Eastern Shore	WPMC-CD	36	WVBT	(Note: Licensed to Mappsville, Virginia.)	
Harrisonburg	WHSV-TV (DRT)	3	WHSV-TV	(Note: Licensed to Broadway, Virginia.)	
Harrisonburg	WHSV-TV (DRT)	3	WHSV-TV	(Note: Licensed to Luray, Virginia.)	
Harrisonburg	WHSV-TV (DRT)	3	WHSV-TV	(Note: Licensed to Massanutten, Virginia.)	
Harrisonburg	W22EX-D	30	WSVW-LD		
Harrisonburg	WHSV-TV (DRT)	3	WHSV-TV	(Note: Licensed to Winchester, Virginia.)	
Norfolk	WKTD-CD	17	WAVY-TV		
Norfolk	WITD-CD	23	WAVY-TV		
Norfolk	WLNO-CD	45	WVBT		
Richmond	WRID-LD	12.6; 65.6	WVBT; WUPV		
Roanoke–Lynchburg	W05AA-D	13	WSET-TV		
~Johnson City, TN	WAPW-CD	19	WKPT-TV	(Note: Licensed to Abingdon, Virginia.)	
~Johnson City, TN	WCYB-TV (DRT)	5	WCYB-TV		

== Defunct ==
- WACH-TV Newport News (1953–1954; 1954–1955)
- WCHV-TV Charlottesville (construction permit, 1953–1954)
- WHFV Fredericksburg (1973–1975)
- WINA-TV Charlottesville (construction permit, 1965–1969)
- WMSY-TV Marion (1981–2017)
- WRFT-TV Roanoke (1966–1974; 1974–1975)
- WROV-TV Roanoke (1953)
- WSBN-TV Norton (1971–2017)
- WTOV-TV Norfolk (1953–1954; 1955–1959)
- WVRN-TV Richmond (1984–1988)

== See also ==
- Virginia § Media

== Bibliography ==
- "United States TV Stations: Virginia", Yearbook of Radio and Television, New York: Radio Television Daily, 1964, OCLC 7469377 – via Internet Archive
