= List of The CW affiliates =

The following is a list of affiliates for The CW, a television network based in the United States. The network is currently controlled by Nexstar Media Group, which holds a majority 81.1% ownership stake, with Skydance holding 18.9% stake. All affiliates owned and/or operated by Nexstar are considered owned-and-operated stations.

Stations are listed in alphabetical order by state/district and media market; affiliates of The CW Plus are also included.

== Affiliate stations ==
The CW television network affiliates
Media market	State/Dist./Terr.	Station	Channel	Year affiliated	Ownership	Notes
Birmingham	Alabama	WIAT	42	2026	Nexstar Media Group	
Dothan	Alabama	WRGX-LD	23.2	2006	Gray Media	
Dothan	Alabama	WTVY	4.3	2006	Gray Media	
Huntsville	Alabama	WHDF	15	2006	Nexstar Media Group	
Mobile	Alabama	WFNA	55	2006	Nexstar Media Group	
Montgomery	Alabama	WBMM	22	2006	Bahakel Communications	
Anchorage	Alaska	KYUR	13.2	2006	Vision Alaska, LLC	(Note: Operated by Coastal Television Broadcasting Company.)
Fairbanks	Alaska	KATN	2.3	2017	Vision Alaska, LLC	
Juneau	Alaska	KJUD	8.2	2006	Vision Alaska, LLC	
Phoenix	Arizona	KAZT-TV	7	2024	Londen Media Group	(Note: Operated by Nexstar Media Group.)
Phoenix	Arizona	KAZT-CD	7	2024	Londen Media Group	(Note: Translator of KAZT-TV.)
Tucson	Arizona	KTTU-TV	18	2024	Nexstar Media Group	
Yuma	Arizona	KECY-TV	9.3	2010	News-Press & Gazette Company	
Fayetteville	Arkansas	KHOG	29.2	2008	Hearst Television	(Note: Satellite of KHBS.)
Fort Smith	Arkansas	KHBS	40.2	2008	Hearst Television	
Jonesboro	Arkansas	KAIT	8.3	2018	Gray Media	
Little Rock	Arkansas	KASN	38	2006	Mission Broadcasting	
Bakersfield	California	KGET-TV	17.2	2006	Nexstar Media Group	
Chico–Redding	California	KHSL-TV	12.2	2006	Allen Media Broadcasting	
Eureka	California	KECA-LD	29	2006	Sinclair Broadcast Group	
Fresno	California	KFRE-TV	59	2006	Sinclair Broadcast Group	
Los Angeles	California	KTLA	5	2006	Nexstar Media Group	
Monterey	California	KCBA	35	2022	VistaWest Media	
Palm Springs	California	KCWQ-LD	2	2006	News-Press & Gazette Company	
Palm Springs	California	KESQ-TV	2.3	2006	News-Press & Gazette Company	
Sacramento	California	KQCA	58	2023	Hearst Television	
San Diego	California	KUSI-TV	51	2026	Nexstar Media Group	
San Francisco	California	KRON-TV	4	2023	Nexstar Media Group	
San Luis Obispo	California	KCOY-TV	12.3	2024	VistaWest Media	
Colorado Springs	Colorado	KXRM-TV	21.2	2008	Nexstar Media Group	
Colorado Springs	Colorado	KXTU-LD	57	2006	Nexstar Media Group	
Denver	Colorado	KWGN-TV	2	2006	Nexstar Media Group	
Grand Junction	Colorado	KREX-TV	5.2	2026	Nexstar Media Group	
Hartford–New Haven	Connecticut	WCCT-TV	20	2006	Nexstar Media Group	
Washington	District of Columbia	WDCW	50	2006	Nexstar Media Group	
Fort Myers	Florida	WXCW	46	2006	Sun Broadcasting	
Gainesville	Florida	WCJB-TV	20.2	2006	Gray Media	
Jacksonville	Florida	WCWJ	17	2006	Graham Media Group	
Miami–Fort Lauderdale	Florida	WBFS-TV	33	2024	CBS Television Stations	
Orlando	Florida	WKCF	18	2006	Hearst Television	
Panama City	Florida	WMBB	13.2	2024	Nexstar Media Group	
Tallahassee	Florida	WTLF	24	2006	Sinclair Broadcast Group	
Tallahassee	Florida	WTLH	49.2	2006	New Age Media, LLC	(Note: Operated by Sinclair Broadcast Group.)
Tampa	Florida	WTTA	38	2023	Nexstar Media Group	
West Palm Beach	Florida	WTVX	34	2006	Sinclair Broadcast Group	
Albany	Georgia	WGCW-LD	36	2019	Gray Media	
Albany	Georgia	WALB	10.4	2019	Gray Media	
Atlanta	Georgia	WPCH-TV	17	2023	Gray Media	
Augusta	Georgia	WJBF	6.2	2024	Nexstar Media Group	
Columbus	Georgia	WLTZ	38.2	2009	Gray Media	
Macon	Georgia	WMAZ-TV	13.2	2013	Nexstar Media Group	
Savannah	Georgia	WSAV-TV	3.2	2016	Nexstar Media Group	
Hagåtña	Guam	KTKB-LD	26	2009	KM Communications	(Note: Operated by Marianas Media.)
Hilo	Hawaii	KHAW-TV	11.2	2006	Nexstar Media Group	(Note: Satellite of KHON-TV.)
Honolulu	Hawaii	KHON-TV	2.2	2006	Nexstar Media Group	
Wailuku	Hawaii	KAII-TV	7.2	2006	Nexstar Media Group	
Boise	Idaho	KYUU-LD	35	2011	Sinclair Broadcast Group	
Boise	Idaho	KBOI-TV	2.2	2011	Sinclair Broadcast Group	
Idaho Falls	Idaho	KIFI-TV	8.3	2009	News-Press & Gazette Company	
Twin Falls	Idaho	KTFT-LD	7.3	2026	Nexstar Media Group	
Champaign–Springfield	Illinois	WBUI	23	2006	GOCOM Media	(Note: Operated by Standard Media.)
Chicago	Illinois	WGN-TV	9	2024	Nexstar Media Group	
Peoria	Illinois	WEEK-TV	25.3	2016	Gray Media	
Quincy	Illinois	WGEM-TV	10.2	2006	Gray Media	
Rockford	Illinois	WSLN	19	2021	Gray Media	
Evansville	Indiana	WTVW	7	2013	Mission Broadcasting	
Fort Wayne	Indiana	WISE-TV	33	2016	Gray Media	
Indianapolis	Indiana	WISH-TV	8	2015	Circle City Broadcasting	
Lafayette	Indiana	WLFI-TV	18.2	2017	Gray Media	
South Bend	Indiana	WCWW-LD	25	2006	Weigel Broadcasting	
Terre Haute	Indiana	WTWO	2.2	2024	Nexstar Media Group	
Cedar Rapids	Iowa	KCRG-TV	9.3	2021	Gray Media	
Davenport	Iowa	KGCW	26	2006	Nexstar Media Group	
Des Moines	Iowa	KCWI-TV	23	2006	Nexstar Media Group	
Ottumwa	Iowa	KYOU-TV	15.4	2018	Gray Media	
Sioux City	Iowa	KTIV	4.2	2006	Gray Media	
Topeka	Kansas	KTKA-TV	49.3	2009	Vaughan Media	
Wichita	Kansas	KSCW-DT	33	2006	Gray Media	
Bowling Green	Kentucky	WBKO	13.3	2006	Gray Media	
Lexington	Kentucky	WKYT-TV	27.2	2006	Gray Media	
Louisville	Kentucky	WBKI	58	2018	Gray Media	
Paducah	Kentucky	KFVS-TV	12.2	2006	Gray Media	
Alexandria	Louisiana	KALB-TV	5.3	2016	Gray Media	
Alexandria	Louisiana	KLGC-LD	25	2021	Gray Media	
Baton Rouge	Louisiana	WBRL-CD	21	2006	Nexstar Media Group	
Baton Rouge	Louisiana	WGMB-TV	44.2	2006	Nexstar Media Group	
Lafayette	Louisiana	KLFY-TV	10.2	2024	Nexstar Media Group	
Lake Charles	Louisiana	KPLC	7.2	2017	Gray Media	
Monroe	Louisiana	KARD	14.2	2024	Nexstar Media Group	
New Orleans	Louisiana	WNOL-TV	38	2006	Nexstar Media Group	
Shreveport	Louisiana	KPXJ	21	2006	KTBS, LLC	
Bangor	Maine	WABI-TV	5.2	2006	Gray Media	
Portland	Maine	WPXT	51	2006	Hearst Television	
Presque Isle	Maine	WAGM-TV	8.3	2018	Gray Media	
Baltimore	Maryland	WNUV	54	2006	Cunningham Broadcasting	
Salisbury	Maryland	WMDT	47.2	2006	Marquee Broadcasting	
Boston	Massachusetts	WLVI	56	2006	Sunbeam Television	
Springfield	Massachusetts	WWLP	22.2	2015	Nexstar Media Group	
Springfield	Massachusetts	WFXQ-CD	28.2	2015	Nexstar Media Group	(Note: Translator of WWLP.)
Detroit	Michigan	WKBD-TV	50	2024	CBS Television Stations	
Flint	Michigan	WBSF	46	2006	Sinclair Broadcast Group	
Grand Rapids	Michigan	WOTV	41.2	2024	Nexstar Media Group	
Lansing	Michigan	WLAJ	53.2	2006	Mission Broadcasting	
Marquette	Michigan	WBUP	10.2	2009	Morgan Murphy Media	
Marquette	Michigan	WJMN-TV	3.2	2024	Sullivan's Landing, LLC	(Note: Operated by Morgan Murphy Media.)
Marquette	Michigan	WBKP	5	2007	Morgan Murphy Media	
Traverse City	Michigan	WFQX-TV	32.2	2018	Cadillac Telecasting Company	(Note: Operated by Heritage Broadcasting Group.)
Duluth	Minnesota	KDLH	3	2006	Gray Media	
Mankato	Minnesota	KMNF-CD	7.2	2019	Gray Media	
Minneapolis–Saint Paul	Minnesota	WUCW	23	2006	Sinclair Broadcast Group	
Rochester	Minnesota	KTTC	10.2	2006	Gray Media	
Biloxi	Mississippi	WXXV-TV	25.3	2015	Morris Multimedia	
Hattiesburg	Mississippi	WHLT	22.2	2014	Nexstar Media Group	
Jackson	Mississippi	WJTV	12	2013	Nexstar Media Group	
Meridian	Mississippi	WTOK-TV	11.3	2006	Gray Media	
Tupelo	Mississippi	WLOV-TV	27	2024	Coastal Television Broadcasting Company	(Note: Operated by Morris Multimedia.)
Jefferson City	Missouri	KOMU-TV	8.3	2006	University of Missouri	
Joplin	Missouri	KFJX	14.2	2018	SagamoreHill Broadcasting	
Kansas City	Missouri	KCWE	29	2006	Hearst Television	
Springfield	Missouri	KYCW-LD	24	2006	Gray Media	
Springfield	Missouri	KSPR-LD	33.2	2017	Gray Media	(Note: Mapped on KSPR-LD's multiplex, but transmits from KYTV's spectrum.)
St. Joseph	Missouri	KNPG-CD	21.2	2016	News-Press & Gazette Company	
St. Louis	Missouri	KPLR-TV	11	2006	Nexstar Media Group	
Billings	Montana	KSVI	6.2	2023	Nexstar Media Group	
Bozeman	Montana	K23LW-D	6.2	2023	Nexstar Media Group	
Grand Island	Nebraska	KNHL	5	2018	Gray Media	(Note: Satellite of KCWH-LD.)
Lincoln	Nebraska	KNPL-LD	10.3	2018	Gray Media	
Lincoln	Nebraska	KCWH-LD	18	2018	Gray Media	
North Platte	Nebraska	KIIT-CD	11.2	2018	Gray Media	(Note: Translator of KCWH-LD.)
Omaha	Nebraska	KPTM	42.3	2021	Sinclair Broadcast Group	
Scottsbluff	Nebraska	KSTF	10.3	2006	Marquee Broadcasting	(Note: Semi-satellite of KGWN-TV.)
Las Vegas	Nevada	KVCW	33	2006	Sinclair Broadcast Group	
Reno	Nevada	KOLO-TV	8.3	2018	Gray Media	
Albuquerque	New Mexico	KWBQ	19	2006	Mission Broadcasting	
Roswell	New Mexico	KRWB-TV	21	2006	Mission Broadcasting	(Note: Satellite of KWBQ.)
Albany	New York	WCWN	45	2006	Sinclair Broadcast Group	
Binghamton	New York	WBNG-TV	12.2	2006	Gray Media	
Buffalo	New York	WNLO	23	2006	Nexstar Media Group	
Elmira	New York	WETM-TV	18.2	2025	Nexstar Media Group	
New York City	New York	WPIX	11	2006	Mission Broadcasting	
Rochester	New York	WHAM-TV	13.2	2006	Sinclair Broadcast Group	
Syracuse	New York	WSTM-TV	3.2	2006	Sinclair Broadcast Group	
Utica	New York	WFXV	33.2	2024	Nexstar Media Group	
Watertown	New York	WWTI	50.2	2006	Nexstar Media Group	
Charlotte	North Carolina	WMYT-TV	55	2025	Nexstar Media Group	
Greensboro	North Carolina	WCWG	20	2006	Hearst Television	
Greenville	North Carolina	WNCT-TV	9.2	2006	Nexstar Media Group	
Raleigh–Durham	North Carolina	WLFL	22	2006	Sinclair Broadcast Group	
Wilmington	North Carolina	WWAY	3.3	2017	Morris Multimedia	
Bismarck	North Dakota	KXMB-TV	12	2016	Nexstar Media Group	
Dickinson	North Dakota	KXMA-TV	2	2016	Nexstar Media Group	(Note: Semi-satellite of KXMB.)
Fargo	North Dakota	KXJB-LD	30.2	2016	Gray Media	
Minot	North Dakota	KXMC-TV	13	2016	Nexstar Media Group	
Williston	North Dakota	KXMD-TV	11	2016	Nexstar Media Group	(Note: Semi-satellite of KXMC.)
Cincinnati	Ohio	WKRC-TV	12.2	2006	Sinclair Broadcast Group	
Cleveland	Ohio	WBNX-TV	55	2025	Nexstar Media Group	
Columbus	Ohio	WWHO	53	2006	Sinclair Broadcast Group	
Dayton	Ohio	WBDT	26	2006	Vaughan Media	
Toledo	Ohio	WTVG	13.2	2014	Gray Media	
Youngstown	Ohio	WFMJ-TV	21.2	2006	Vindicator Publishing	
Oklahoma City	Oklahoma	KAUT-TV	43	2023	Nexstar Media Group	
Tulsa	Oklahoma	KQCW-DT	19	2006	Griffin Communications	
Bend	Oregon	KTVZ	21.2	2006	News-Press & Gazette Company	
Coos Bay	Oregon	KMCB	23.2	2006	Sinclair Broadcast Group	(Note: Satellite of KMTR.)
Eugene	Oregon	KMTR	16.2	2006	Sinclair Broadcast Group	
Medford	Oregon	KTVL	10.2	2006	Sinclair Broadcast Group	
Portland	Oregon	KRCW-TV	32	2006	Nexstar Media Group	
Roseburg	Oregon	KTCW	46.2	2006	Sinclair Broadcast Group	
Erie	Pennsylvania	WJET-TV	24.2	2025	Nexstar Media Group	
Harrisburg	Pennsylvania	WHP-TV	21.3	2016	Sinclair Broadcast Group	
Johnstown	Pennsylvania	WJAC-TV	6.4	2019	Sinclair Broadcast Group	
Philadelphia	Pennsylvania	WPHL-TV	17	2023	Nexstar Media Group	
Pittsburgh	Pennsylvania	WPNT	22	2023	Sinclair Broadcast Group	
Scranton	Pennsylvania	WSWB	38	2006	Sinclair Broadcast Group	
Scranton	Pennsylvania	WOLF-TV	56.2	2006	Sinclair Broadcast Group	
Scranton	Pennsylvania	WQMY	53.3	2006	Sinclair Broadcast Group	
Providence	Rhode Island	WNAC-TV	64.2	2017	Nexstar Media Group	
Charleston	South Carolina	WCBD-TV	2.2	2006	Nexstar Media Group	
Columbia	South Carolina	WIS	10.2	2019	Gray Media	
Florence	South Carolina	WPDE-TV	15.2	2021	Sinclair Broadcast Group	
Spartanburg	South Carolina	WSPA-TV	7	2026	Nexstar Media Group	
Florence	South Dakota	KDLO-TV	3.4	2024	Nexstar Media Group	(Note: Semi-satellite of KELO-TV.)
Pierre	South Dakota	KPLO-TV	6.4	2024	Nexstar Media Group	
Rapid City	South Dakota	KCLO-TV	15	2017	Nexstar Media Group	
Sioux Falls	South Dakota	KELO-TV	11.4	2024	Nexstar Media Group	
Chattanooga	Tennessee	WFLI-TV	53	2006	Sinclair Broadcast Group	
Jackson	Tennessee	WNBJ-LD	39.2	2018	Coastal Television Broadcasting Company	
Johnson City	Tennessee	WCYB-TV	5.2	2006	Sinclair Broadcast Group	
Knoxville	Tennessee	WBXX-TV	20	2006	Gray Media	
Memphis	Tennessee	WLMT	30	2006	Nexstar Media Group	
Nashville	Tennessee	WZTV	17.2	2021	Sinclair Broadcast Group	
Abilene	Texas	KTXS-TV	12.2	2006	Sinclair Broadcast Group	
Amarillo	Texas	KVII-TV	7.2	2006	Sinclair Broadcast Group	
Austin	Texas	KNVA	54	2006	Vaughan Media	
Beaumont–Port Arthur	Texas	KFDM	6.2	2006	Sinclair Broadcast Group	
Bryan	Texas	KBTX-TV	3.2	2006	Gray Media	
Corpus Christi	Texas	KSCC	38.3	2024	Sinclair Broadcast Group	
Dallas–Fort Worth	Texas	KDAF	33	2006	Nexstar Media Group	
El Paso	Texas	KVIA-TV	7.2	2006	News-Press & Gazette Company	
Harlingen	Texas	KGBT-TV	4	2026	Nexstar Media Group	
Houston	Texas	KIAH	39	2006	Nexstar Media Group	
Laredo	Texas	KYLX-CD	13.2	2015	Gray Media	
Lubbock	Texas	KLCW-TV	22	2006	Gray Media	
Midland–Odessa	Texas	KCWO-TV	4	2019	Gray Media	
Midland–Odessa	Texas	KOSA-TV	7.2	2019	Gray Media	(Note: Translator for KCWO-TV.)
San Angelo	Texas	KTXE-LD	38.2	2006	Sinclair Broadcast Group	
San Antonio	Texas	WOAI-TV	4.2	2021	Sinclair Broadcast Group	
Sherman	Texas	KTEN	10.2	2006	Lockwood Broadcast Group	
Tyler	Texas	KYTX	19.2	2012	Nexstar Media Group	
Victoria	Texas	KVCT	19.3	2018	SagamoreHill Broadcasting	
Waco	Texas	KNCT	46	2019	Gray Media	
Wichita Falls	Texas	KFDX-TV	3.3	2024	Nexstar Media Group	
Salt Lake City	Utah	KUCW	30	2006	Nexstar Media Group	
Burlington	Vermont	WNNE	31	2018	Hearst Television	
Charlottesville	Virginia	WVIR-TV	29.3	2006	Gray Media	
Charlottesville	Virginia	WVIR-CD	29.3	2019	Gray Media	
Harrisonburg	Virginia	WSVW-LD	30.2	2019	Gray Media	
Harrisonburg	Virginia	W22EX-D	30.2	2019	Gray Media	
Norfolk	Virginia	WVBT	43.2	2024	Nexstar Media Group	
Richmond	Virginia	WUPV	65	2006	Gray Media	
Roanoke	Virginia	WWCW	21	2006	Nexstar Media Group	
Roanoke	Virginia	WFXR	27.2	2006	Nexstar Media Group	(Note: Satellite of WWCW.)
Seattle	Washington	KUNS-TV	51	2024	Sinclair Broadcast Group	
Spokane	Washington	KSKN	22	2006	Nexstar Media Group	
Yakima	Washington	KIMA-TV	29.2	2009	Sinclair Broadcast Group	
Yakima	Washington	KEPR-TV	19.2	2009	Sinclair Broadcast Group	
Bluefield	West Virginia	WVVA	6.2	2006	Gray Media	
Clarksburg	West Virginia	WVFX	10.2	2006	Gray Media	
Huntington–Charleston	West Virginia	WQCW	30	2006	Gray Media	
Parkersburg	West Virginia	WOVA-CD	22.2	2018	Gray Media	
Eau Claire	Wisconsin	WECX-LD	14	2021	Gray Media	(Note: Satellite of WEAU; WECX's CW affiliation is mapped as the primary channel.)
Eau Claire	Wisconsin	WEAU	14.10	2021	Gray Media	
Green Bay	Wisconsin	WCWF	14	2006	Sinclair Broadcast Group	
Madison	Wisconsin	WMTV	15.2	2016	Gray Media	
Milwaukee	Wisconsin	WVTV	18	2006	Standard Media	
Sayner	Wisconsin	W21DS-D	7.4	2021	Gray Media	(Note: Translator of WSAW-TV.)
Wausau	Wisconsin	WYOW	34	2006	Gray Media	(Note: Satellite of WSAW-TV; WYOW's CW affiliation is mapped as the primary channel.)
Wausau	Wisconsin	WSAW-TV	7.4	2021	Gray Media	
Casper	Wyoming	KCWY-DT	13.2	2015	Marquee Broadcasting	
Cheyenne	Wyoming	KGWN-TV	5.3	2006	Marquee Broadcasting	

== See also ==
- List of American Broadcasting Company television affiliates
- List of CBS television affiliates
- List of Fox Broadcasting Company affiliates
- List of NBC television affiliates
- List of PBS member stations
