= WAHU =

WAHU may refer to:

- WAHU-LD, a low-power television station (channel 31) licensed to serve Crozet, Virginia, United States; see List of television stations in Virginia
- WVIR-CD, a low-power television station (channel 35, virtual 29) licensed to serve Charlottesville, Virginia, which held the call signs WAHU-CA or WAHU-CD from 2005 to 2009
