= List of American Broadcasting Company television affiliates =

The following is a list of affiliates for ABC, a television network based in the United States. All affiliates owned by the network's ABC Owned Television Stations division are owned-and-operated stations.

Stations are listed in alphabetical order by state, district or territory and media market.

- (**) – Indicates station was built and signed on by ABC.

== Affiliate stations ==
ABC television network affiliates
Media market	State/Dist./Terr.	Station	Channel	Year affiliated	Ownership	Notes
Birmingham	Alabama	WABM	68.2	2014	Sinclair Broadcast Group	
Birmingham	Alabama	WBMA-LD	58	1996	Sinclair Broadcast Group	
Birmingham	Alabama	WDBB	17.2	2014	Cunningham Broadcasting	(Note: Operated by Sinclair Broadcast Group.)
Birmingham	Alabama	WGWW	40.2	2014	Howard Stirk Holdings	(Note: Operated by Sinclair Broadcast Group.)
Dothan	Alabama	WDHN	18	1970	Nexstar Media Group	
Huntsville	Alabama	WAAY-TV	31	1977	Gray Media	
Montgomery	Alabama	WNCF	32	1962	SagamoreHill Broadcasting	(Note: Operated by Bahakel Communications.)
Anchorage	Alaska	KYUR	13	1971	Vision Alaska, LLC	(Note: Operated by Coastal Television Broadcasting Company.)
Fairbanks	Alaska	KATN	2	1985	Vision Alaska, LLC	(Note: Operated by Coastal Television Broadcasting Company.)
Juneau	Alaska	KJUD	8	1956	Vision Alaska, LLC	
Pago Pago	American Samoa	KVZK-TV	5	2015	Government of American Samoa	
Phoenix	Arizona	KNXV-TV	15	1995	E. W. Scripps Company	
Tucson	Arizona	KGUN-TV	9	1957	E. W. Scripps Company	
Yuma	Arizona	KECY-TV	9.2	2007	News-Press & Gazette Company	
Fayetteville	Arkansas	KHOG-TV	29	1978	Hearst Television	(Note: Satellite of KHBS.)
Fort Smith	Arkansas	KHBS	40	1978	Hearst Television	
Jonesboro	Arkansas	KAIT	8	1965	Gray Media	
Little Rock	Arkansas	KATV	7	1956	Sinclair Broadcast Group	
Bakersfield	California	KERO-TV	23	1996	E. W. Scripps Company	
Chico–Redding	California	KRCR-TV	7	1978	Sinclair Broadcast Group	
Eureka	California	KAEF-TV	23	1989	Sinclair Broadcast Group	(Note: Satellite of KRCR-TV.)
Fresno	California	KFSN-TV	30	1986	ABC Owned Television Stations	
Los Angeles	California	KABC-TV **	7	1949	ABC Owned Television Stations	
Monterey	California	KSBW	8.2	2011	Hearst Television	
Palm Springs	California	KESQ-TV	42	1968	News-Press & Gazette Company	
Sacramento	California	KXTV	10	1995	Nexstar Media Group	
San Diego	California	KGTV	10	1977	E. W. Scripps Company	
San Francisco	California	KGO-TV **	7	1949	ABC Owned Television Stations	
San Luis Obispo	California	KEYT-TV	3	1964	News-Press & Gazette Company	
Colorado Springs	Colorado	KRDO-TV	13	1960	News-Press & Gazette Company	
Denver	Colorado	KMGH-TV	7	1995	E. W. Scripps Company	
Grand Junction	Colorado	KJCT-CD	8	2014	E. W. Scripps Company	
Hartford–New Haven	Connecticut	WTNH	8	1955	Nexstar Media Group	
Washington	District of Columbia	WJLA-TV	7	1948	Sinclair Broadcast Group	
Fort Myers	Florida	WZVN-TV	26	1974	Montclair Communications	(Note: Operated by Hearst Television.)
Gainesville	Florida	WCJB-TV	20	1973	Gray Media	
Jacksonville	Florida	WJXX	25	1997	Nexstar Media Group	
Miami–Fort Lauderdale	Florida	WSVN	7.2	2025	Sunbeam Television	
Miami–Fort Lauderdale	Florida	WDFL-LD	18	2025	Findal Media	(Note: Translator of WSVN 7.2.)
Orlando	Florida	WFTV	9	1958	Cox Media Group	
Panama City	Florida	WMBB	13	1982	Nexstar Media Group	
Pensacola	Florida	WEAR-TV	3	1955	Sinclair Broadcast Group	
Sarasota	Florida	WWSB	40	1971	Gray Media	
Tallahassee	Florida	WTXL-TV	27	1976	E. W. Scripps Company	
Tampa	Florida	WFTS-TV	28	1994	E. W. Scripps Company	
West Palm Beach	Florida	WPBF	25	1989	Hearst Television	
Albany	Georgia	WALB	10.2	2011	Gray Media	
Atlanta	Georgia	WSB-TV	2	1980	Cox Media Group	
Augusta	Georgia	WJBF	6	1967	Nexstar Media Group	
Columbus	Georgia	WTVM	9	1960	Gray Media	
Macon	Georgia	WGXA	24.2	2010	Sinclair Broadcast Group	
Savannah	Georgia	WJCL	22	1985	Hearst Television	
Hagåtña	Guam	KTGM	14	1988	Lilly Broadcasting	(Note: Operated by Lilly Broadcasting.)
Hilo	Hawaii	KHVO-TV	4	1960	Allen Media Broadcasting	(Note: Satellite of KITV.)
Honolulu	Hawaii	KITV	4	1954	Allen Media Broadcasting	
Wailuku	Hawaii	KMAU-TV	4	1955	Allen Media Broadcasting	
Boise	Idaho	KIVI-TV	6	1974	E. W. Scripps Company	
Idaho Falls	Idaho	KIFI-TV	8	1996	News-Press & Gazette Company	
Twin Falls	Idaho	KSAW-LD	6	1985	E. W. Scripps Company	(Note: Semi-satellite of KIVI-TV.)
Champaign–Springfield	Illinois	WICD	15	2005	Rincon Broadcasting Group	(Note: Semi-satellite of WICS.)
Champaign–Springfield	Illinois	WICS	20	2005	Rincon Broadcasting Group	
Chicago	Illinois	WLS-TV **	7	1948	ABC Owned Television Stations	
Peoria	Illinois	WEEK-TV	25.2	2016	Gray Media	
Quincy	Illinois	KHQA-TV	7.2	2007	Rincon Broadcasting Group	
Rockford	Illinois	WTVO	17	1995	Mission Broadcasting	(Note: Operated by Nexstar Media Group.)
Evansville	Indiana	WEHT	25	1995	Nexstar Media Group	
Fort Wayne	Indiana	WPTA	21	1957	Gray Media	
Indianapolis	Indiana	WRTV	6	1979	Circle City Broadcasting	
Lafayette	Indiana	WPBY-CD	35	2017	Coastal Television Broadcasting Company	
South Bend	Indiana	WBND-LD	57	1995	Weigel Broadcasting	
Terre Haute	Indiana	WAWV-TV	38	2011	Mission Broadcasting	
Cedar Rapids	Iowa	KCRG-TV	9	1953	Gray Media	
Davenport (Quad Cities)	Iowa	WQAD-TV	8	1963	Nexstar Media Group	
Des Moines	Iowa	WOI-DT	5	1955	Nexstar Media Group	
Ottumwa	Iowa	KTVO	3	1968	Rincon Broadcasting Group	
Sioux City	Iowa	KCAU-TV	9	1967	Nexstar Media Group	
Garden City	Kansas	KUPK	13	1964	Lockwood Broadcast Group	(Note: Satellite of KAKE.)
Colby	Kansas	KLBY	4	1987	Lockwood Broadcast Group	(Note: Satellite of KAKE.)
Hays	Kansas	KGBD-LD	30	2003	Lockwood Broadcast Group	(Note: Translator of KAKE.)
Salina	Kansas	KHDS-LD	29	2003	Lockwood Broadcast Group	
Topeka	Kansas	KTKA-TV	49	1983	Vaughan Media	
Wichita	Kansas	KAKE	10	1954	Lockwood Broadcast Group	
Bowling Green	Kentucky	WBKO	13	1967	Gray Media	
Lexington	Kentucky	WTVQ-DT	36	1968	E. W. Scripps Company	
Louisville	Kentucky	WHAS-TV	11	1990	Nexstar Media Group	
Paducah	Kentucky	WSIL-TV	3	1953	Gray Media	
Paducah	Kentucky	KPOB-TV	15	1967	Gray Media	(Note: Satellite of WSIL-TV.)
Alexandria	Louisiana	KLAX-TV	31	1985	Deltavision Media	
Baton Rouge	Louisiana	WBRZ-TV	2	1977	The Manship family	
Lafayette	Louisiana	KATC	3	1962	E.W. Scripps Company	
Lake Charles	Louisiana	KVHP	29.2	2017	American Spirit Media	(Note: Operated by Gray Media.)
Monroe	Louisiana	KNOE-TV	8.2	2014	Gray Media	
New Orleans	Louisiana	WGNO	26	1996	Nexstar Media Group	
Shreveport	Louisiana	KTBS-TV	3	1961	KTBS, LLC	
Bangor	Maine	WVII-TV	7	1965	Rockfleet Broadcasting	
Portland	Maine	WMTW	8	1954	Hearst Television	
Baltimore	Maryland	WMAR-TV	2	1995	E. W. Scripps Company	
Salisbury	Maryland	WMDT	47	1980	Marquee Broadcasting	
Boston	Massachusetts	WCVB-TV	5	1972	Hearst Television	
Springfield	Massachusetts	WGGB-TV	40	1959	Gray Media	
Alpena	Michigan	WBKB-TV	11.3	2013	Morgan Murphy Media	
Battle Creek	Michigan	WOTV	41	1971	Nexstar Media Group	
Detroit	Michigan	WXYZ-TV **	7	1948	E. W. Scripps Company	
Flint	Michigan	WJRT-TV	12	1958	Allen Media Broadcasting	
Grand Rapids	Michigan	WZZM	13	1962	Nexstar Media Group	
Lansing	Michigan	WLAJ	53	1990	Mission Broadcasting	
Marquette	Michigan	WBKP	5.2	2007	Morgan Murphy Media	(Note: Satellite of WBUP.)
Marquette	Michigan	WBUP	10	2003	Morgan Murphy Media	
Marquette	Michigan	WJMN-TV	3	2024	Sullivan's Landing, LLC	(Note: Operated by Morgan Murphy Media.)
Sault Ste. Marie	Michigan	WGTQ	8	1976	Cunningham Broadcasting	(Note: Satellite of WGTU.)
Sault Ste. Marie	Michigan	WTOM-TV	4	2014	Sinclair Broadcast Group	(Note: Satellite of WPBN-TV.)
Traverse City	Michigan	WGTU	29	1971	Cunningham Broadcasting	
Traverse City	Michigan	WPBN-TV	7.2	2014	Sinclair Broadcast Group	
Alexandria	Minnesota	KSAX	42	1987	Hubbard Broadcasting	(Note: Satellite of KSTP-TV.)
Duluth	Minnesota	WDIO-TV	10	1966	Hubbard Broadcasting	
Hibbing	Minnesota	WIRT	13	1967	Hubbard Broadcasting	(Note: Satellite of WDIO-TV.)
Minneapolis–Saint Paul	Minnesota	KSTP-TV	5	1979	Hubbard Broadcasting	
Redwood Falls	Minnesota	KRWF	43	1987	Hubbard Broadcasting	
Rochester	Minnesota	KAAL	6	1954	Hubbard Broadcasting	
Biloxi	Mississippi	WLOX	13	1962	Gray Media	
Greenwood	Mississippi	WABG-TV	6	1966	Deltavision Media	
Hattiesburg	Mississippi	WDAM-TV	7.2	2012	Gray Media	
Jackson	Mississippi	WAPT	16	1970	Hearst Television	
Meridian	Mississippi	WTOK-TV	11	1980	Gray Media	
Tupelo	Mississippi	WTVA	9.2	2012	Gray Media	
Jefferson City	Missouri	KMIZ	17	1986	News-Press & Gazette Company	
Joplin	Missouri	KODE-TV	12	1968	Mission Broadcasting	
Kansas City	Missouri	KMBC-TV	9	1955	Hearst Television	
Springfield	Missouri	KSPR-LD	33	2017	Gray Media	
St. Joseph	Missouri	KQTV	2	1967	Heartland Media	
St. Louis	Missouri	KMOV	32	2026	Gray Media	
Billings	Montana	KSVI	6	1993	Nexstar Media Group	
Bozeman	Montana	KWYB-LD	28	1996	Cowles Company	(Note: Translator of KWYB.)
Butte	Montana	KWYB	18	1996	Cowles Company	
Great Falls	Montana	KFBB-TV	5	1966	Cowles Company	
Helena	Montana	KHBB-LD	21	1998	Cowles Company	(Note: Semi-satellite of KFBB-TV.)
Missoula	Montana	KTMF	23	1990	Cowles Company	
Grand Island	Nebraska	KHGI-TV	13	1961	Sinclair Broadcast Group	
Hayes Center	Nebraska	KWNB-TV	6	1961	Sinclair Broadcast Group	(Note: Satellite of KHGI-TV.)
Lincoln	Nebraska	KLKN	8	1986	Rincon Broadcasting Group	
North Platte	Nebraska	KHGI-CD	27	1989	Sinclair Broadcast Group	
Omaha	Nebraska	KETV	7	1957	Hearst Television	
Las Vegas	Nevada	KTNV-TV	13	1957	E. W. Scripps Company	
Reno	Nevada	KOLO-TV	8	1972	Gray Media	
Manchester	New Hampshire	WMUR-TV	9	1954	Hearst Television	
Albuquerque	New Mexico	KOAT-TV	7	1953	Hearst Television	
Clovis	New Mexico	KVIH-TV	12	1979	Sinclair Broadcast Group	(Note: Satellite of KVII-TV.)
Albany	New York	WTEN	10	1977	Nexstar Media Group	
Binghamton	New York	WIVT	34	1962	Nexstar Media Group	
Buffalo	New York	WKBW-TV	7	1958	E. W. Scripps Company	
Elmira	New York	WENY-TV	36	1969	Lilly Broadcasting	
New York City	New York	WABC-TV **	7	1948	ABC Owned Television Stations	
Rochester	New York	WHAM-TV	13	1962	Deerfield Media	
Syracuse	New York	WSYR-TV	9	1962	Nexstar Media Group	
Utica	New York	WUTR	20	1970	Mission Broadcasting	
Watertown	New York	WWTI	50	1988	Nexstar Media Group	
Asheville	North Carolina	WLOS-TV	13	1954	Sinclair Broadcast Group	
Charlotte	North Carolina	WSOC-TV	9	1978	Cox Media Group	
Greensboro	North Carolina	WXLV-TV	45	1995	Sinclair Broadcast Group	
Greenville	North Carolina	WCTI-TV	12	1963	Sinclair Broadcast Group	
Raleigh–Durham	North Carolina	WTVD	11	1985	ABC Owned Television Stations	
Wilmington	North Carolina	WWAY	3	1964	Morris Multimedia	
Bismarck	North Dakota	KBMY	17	1985	Forum Communications	
Fargo	North Dakota	WDAY-TV	6	1983	Forum Communications	
Grand Forks	North Dakota	WDAZ-TV	8	1983	Forum Communications	(Note: Semi-satellite of WDAY-TV.)
Minot	North Dakota	KMCY	14	1985	Forum Communications	(Note: Satellite of KBMY-TV.)
Saipan	North Mariana Isl.	KPPI-LP	7	2005	Lilly Broadcasting	(Note: Satellite of KTGM.)
Cincinnati	Ohio	WCPO-TV	9	1996	E. W. Scripps Company	
Cleveland	Ohio	WEWS-TV	5	1955	E. W. Scripps Company	
Columbus	Ohio	WSYX	6	1956	Sinclair Broadcast Group	
Dayton	Ohio	WKEF	22	2004	Sinclair Broadcast Group	
Lima	Ohio	WAMS-LD	35	2009	Gray Media	(Note: Translator of WOHL-CD.)
Lima	Ohio	WOHL-CD	35	2009	Gray Media	
Lima	Ohio	WPNM-LD	35	2009	Gray Media	
Toledo	Ohio	WTVG	13	1995	Gray Media	
Youngstown	Ohio	WYTV	33	1953	Vaughan Media	
Oklahoma City	Oklahoma	KOCO-TV	5	1954	Hearst Television	
Tulsa	Oklahoma	KTUL-TV	8	1954	Sinclair Broadcast Group	
Bend	Oregon	KOHD	18	2006	BendBroadband	
Eugene	Oregon	KEZI	9	1960	Allen Media Broadcasting	
Klamath Falls	Oregon	KDKF	31	1989	Allen Media Broadcasting	(Note: Satellite of KDRV.)
Medford	Oregon	KDRV	12	1984	Allen Media Broadcasting	
Portland	Oregon	KATU	2	1964	Sinclair Broadcast Group	
Erie	Pennsylvania	WJET-TV	24	1966	Nexstar Media Group	
Harrisburg	Pennsylvania	WHTM-TV	27	1954	Nexstar Media Group	
Johnstown	Pennsylvania	WATM-TV	23	1988	Palm Television	(Note: Operated by Cunningham Broadcasting and Sinclair Broadcast Group.)
Johnstown	Pennsylvania	WWCP-TV	8.2	2009	Cunningham Broadcasting	
Philadelphia	Pennsylvania	WPVI-TV	6	1948	ABC Owned Television Stations	
Pittsburgh	Pennsylvania	WTAE-TV	4	1958	Hearst Television	
Scranton	Pennsylvania	WNEP-TV	16	1954	Nexstar Media Group	
Carolina	Puerto Rico	WRFB	5	2020	Telecinco, Inc.	(Note: Satellite of WORA-TV.)
Mayagüez	Puerto Rico	WORA-TV	5	2020	Telecinco, Inc.	
Providence	Rhode Island	WJAR	10.2	2025	Sinclair Broadcast Group	
Charleston	South Carolina	WCIV	36.2	2014	Sinclair Broadcast Group	
Columbia	South Carolina	WOLO-TV	25	1961	Bahakel Communications	
Florence	South Carolina	WPDE-TV	15	1980	Sinclair Broadcast Group	
Lead	South Dakota	KHSD-TV	11	2016	Gray Media	(Note: Satellite of KOTA-TV.)
Pierre	South Dakota	KPRY-TV	4	1983	Gray Media	(Note: Satellite of KSFY-TV.)
Rapid City	South Dakota	KOTA-TV	3	2016	Gray Media	
Sioux Falls	South Dakota	KSFY-TV	13	1983	Gray Media	
Chattanooga	Tennessee	WTVC	9	1958	Sinclair Broadcast Group	
Jackson	Tennessee	WBBJ-TV	7	1967	Bahakel Communications	
Johnson City	Tennessee	WJHL-TV	11.2	2016	Nexstar Media Group	
Knoxville	Tennessee	WATE-TV	6	1979	Nexstar Media Group	
Memphis	Tennessee	WATN-TV	24	1995	Nexstar Media Group	
Nashville	Tennessee	WKRN-TV	2	1954	Nexstar Media Group	
Abilene	Texas	KTXS-TV	12	1979	Sinclair Broadcast Group	
Amarillo	Texas	KVII-TV	7	1957	Sinclair Broadcast Group	
Austin	Texas	KVUE	24	1971	Nexstar Media Group	
Beaumont–Port Arthur	Texas	KBMT	12	1961	Nexstar Media Group	
Bryan	Texas	KRHD-CD	15	1998	E. W. Scripps Company	(Note: Satellite of KXXV.)
Corpus Christi	Texas	KIII	3	1964	Nexstar Media Group	
Dallas–Fort Worth	Texas	WFAA	8	1957	Nexstar Media Group	
El Paso	Texas	KVIA-TV	7	1956	News-Press & Gazette Company	
Harlingen	Texas	KRGV-TV	5	1976	The Manship family	
Houston	Texas	KTRK-TV	13	1954	ABC Owned Television Stations	
Laredo	Texas	KGNS-TV	8.2	2014	Gray Media	
Lubbock	Texas	KAMC	28	1969	Mission Broadcasting	
Midland–Odessa	Texas	KMID-TV	2	1982	Nexstar Media Group	
San Angelo	Texas	KTXE-LD	38	2003	Sinclair Broadcast Group	(Note: Satellite of KTXS-TV.)
San Antonio	Texas	KSAT-TV	12	1957	Graham Media Group	
Sherman	Texas	KTEN	10.3	2010	Lockwood Broadcast Group	
Tyler	Texas	KLTV	7	1984	Gray Media	
Tyler	Texas	KTRE	9	1964	Gray Media	(Note: Semi-satellite of KLTV.)
Victoria	Texas	KAVU-TV	25	1993	Morgan Murphy Media	
Waco	Texas	KXXV	25	1985	E. W. Scripps Company	
Wichita Falls	Texas	KSWO-TV	7	1953	Gray Media	
Christiansted	U.S. Virgin Islands	WCVI-TV	23.2	2016	Lilly Broadcasting	(Note: Rebroadcasts news from WENY-TV, Elmira, NY.)
Salt Lake City	Utah	KTVX	4	1960	Nexstar Media Group	
Burlington	Vermont	WVNY	22	1968	Mission Broadcasting	
Charlottesville	Virginia	WVAW-LD	16	2004	Lockwood Broadcast Group	
Harrisonburg	Virginia	WHSV-TV	3	1968	Gray Media	
Norfolk	Virginia	WVEC	13	1959	Nexstar Media Group	
Richmond	Virginia	WRIC-TV	8	1965	Nexstar Media Group	
Roanoke	Virginia	WSET-TV	13	1955	Sinclair Broadcast Group	
Kennewick	Washington	KVEW	42	1970	Morgan Murphy Media	(Note: Semi-satellite of KAPP.)
Seattle	Washington	KOMO-TV	4	1959	Sinclair Broadcast Group	
Spokane	Washington	KXLY-TV	4	1976	Morgan Murphy Media	
Yakima	Washington	KAPP	35	1970	Morgan Murphy Media	
Bluefield	West Virginia	WOAY-TV	4	1967	Thomas Broadcasting Company	
Clarksburg	West Virginia	WBOY-TV	12.2	2008	Nexstar Media Group	
Huntington–Charleston	West Virginia	WCHS-TV	8	1986	Sinclair Broadcast Group	
Wheeling	West Virginia	WTRF-TV	7.3	2008	Nexstar Media Group	
Eau Claire	Wisconsin	WQOW	18	1980	Allen Media Broadcasting	(Note: Semi-satellite of WXOW.)
Green Bay	Wisconsin	WBAY-TV	2	1992	Gray Media	
La Crosse	Wisconsin	WXOW	19	1970	Allen Media Broadcasting	
Madison	Wisconsin	WKOW	27	1956	Allen Media Broadcasting	
Milwaukee	Wisconsin	WISN-TV	12	1977	Hearst Television	
Wausau	Wisconsin	WMOW	4.2	2010	Allen Media Broadcasting	(Note: Satellite of WAOW.)
Wausau	Wisconsin	WAOW	9	1965	Allen Media Broadcasting	
Casper	Wyoming	KTWO-TV	2	2004	Vision Alaska, LLC	
Cheyenne	Wyoming	KKTQ-LD	16	2011	Vision Alaska, LLC	(Note: Semi-satellite of KTWO-TV.)
Cheyenne	Wyoming	KLWY	27.2	2009	Coastal Television Broadcasting Company	
Sheridan	Wyoming	KSGW-TV	12	1984	Gray Media	

=== Outside the U.S. ===
Location	Station	Channel	Year affiliated	Ownership
Hamilton, Bermuda	ZFB-TV	7	1965	Bermuda Broadcasting

== See also ==
- List of CBS television affiliates
- List of Fox Broadcasting Company affiliates
- List of NBC television affiliates
- List of PBS member stations
- List of The CW affiliates
