= List of CBS television affiliates =

The following is a list of affiliates for CBS, a television network based in the United States. All affiliates owned by the network's CBS News and Stations division are owned-and-operated stations.

Stations are listed in alphabetical order by state, district or territory and media market.

== Affiliate stations ==
CBS television network affiliates
Media market	State/Dist./Terr.	Station	Channel	Year affiliated	Ownership	Notes
Birmingham	Alabama	WVTM	13.4	2026	Hearst Television	
Dothan	Alabama	WTVY	4	1955	Gray Media	
Huntsville	Alabama	WHNT-TV	19	1963	Nexstar Media Group	
Mobile	Alabama	WKRG-TV	5	1955	Nexstar Media Group	
Montgomery	Alabama	WAKA	8	1973	Bahakel Communications	
Anchorage	Alaska	KYES-LD	5	2020	Gray Media	
Anchorage	Alaska	KTUU-TV	5.11	2021	Gray Media	(Note: Translator of KYES-LD.)
Fairbanks	Alaska	KXDF-CD	13	1996	Gray Media	
Juneau	Alaska	KYEX-LD	5	2020	Gray Media	(Note: Satellite of KYES-LD.)
Sitka–Ketchikan	Alaska	KUBD	5	2000	Gray Media	
Sitka–Ketchikan	Alaska	KSCT-LD	5	2000	Gray Media	(Note: Translator of KUBD.)
Pago Pago	American Samoa	KVZK-TV	8	2015	Government of American Samoa	(Note: Satellite of KGMB.)
Phoenix	Arizona	KPHO-TV	5	1994	Gray Media	
Tucson	Arizona	KOLD-TV	13	1953	Gray Media	
Yuma	Arizona	KYMA-DT	13.1	1994	Rincon Broadcasting Group	(Note: Operated by News-Press & Gazette Company.)
Fort Smith	Arkansas	KFSM-TV	5	1980	Nexstar Media Group	
Jonesboro	Arkansas	KJNB-CD	39.2	2015	Coastal Television	
Jonesboro	Arkansas	K22PF-D	42.2	2015	Coastal Television	(Note: Translator of KJNB-CD.)
Little Rock	Arkansas	KTHV	11	1955	Nexstar Media Group	
Bakersfield	California	KBAK-TV	29	1996	Sinclair Broadcast Group	
Chico–Redding	California	KHSL-TV	12	1953	Allen Media Broadcasting	
Eureka	California	KVIQ-LD	14	1986	Marquee Broadcasting	
Fresno	California	KGPE	47	1985	Nexstar Media Group	
Los Angeles	California	KCBS-TV	2	1951	CBS News and Stations	
Monterey	California	KION-TV	46	1969	News-Press & Gazette Company	
Palm Springs	California	KPSP-CD	38	2002	News-Press & Gazette Company	
Sacramento	California	KOVR	13	1995	CBS News and Stations	
San Diego	California	KFMB-TV	8	1949	Nexstar Media Group	
San Francisco	California	KPIX-TV	5	1948	CBS News and Stations	
San Luis Obispo	California	KEYT-TV	3.2	2021	News-Press & Gazette Company	
Colorado Springs	Colorado	KKTV	11	1952	E. W. Scripps Company	
Denver	Colorado	KCNC-TV	4	1995	CBS News and Stations	
Durango	Colorado	KREZ-TV	6	1965	Nexstar Media Group	(Note: Satellite of KRQE.)
Grand Junction	Colorado	KREX-TV	5	1954	Nexstar Media Group	
Montrose	Colorado	KREY-TV	10	1960	Nexstar Media Group	(Note: Satellite of KREX-TV.)
Hartford–New Haven	Connecticut	WFSB	3	1958	Gray Media	
Washington	District of Columbia	WUSA	9	1949	Nexstar Media Group	
Fort Myers	Florida	WINK-TV	11	1954	Fort Myers Broadcasting Company	
Gainesville	Florida	WGFL	28	2002	New Age Media	(Note: Operated by Sinclair Broadcast Group.)
Jacksonville	Florida	WJAX-TV	47	2002	Hoffmann Communications	(Note: Operated by Cox Media Group.)
Miami–Fort Lauderdale	Florida	WFOR-TV	4	1989	CBS News and Stations	
Orlando	Florida	WKMG-TV	6	1954	Graham Media Group	
Panama City	Florida	WECP-LD	21	2012	Gray Media	
Tallahassee	Florida	WCTV	6	1959	Gray Media	
Tampa	Florida	WTSP	10	1994	Nexstar Media Group	
West Palm Beach	Florida	WPEC	12	1989	Sinclair Broadcast Group	
Albany	Georgia	WSWG	44	2006	Marquee Broadcasting	
Atlanta	Georgia	WUPA	69	2025	CBS News and Stations	
Augusta	Georgia	WRDW-TV	12	1954	Gray Media	
Columbus	Georgia	WRBL	3	1953	Nexstar Media Group	
Macon	Georgia	WMAZ-TV	13	1953	Nexstar Media Group	
Savannah	Georgia	WTOC-TV	11	1954	Gray Media	
Hagåtña	Guam	KUAM-TV	8.2	2009	Pacific Telestations, Inc.	
Hilo	Hawaii	KSIX-TV	13.3	2009	Gray Media	
Honolulu	Hawaii	KGMB	5	1952	Gray Media	
Wailuku	Hawaii	KOGG	13.2	2009	Gray Media	
Boise	Idaho	KBOI-TV	2	1953	Sinclair Broadcast Group	
Idaho Falls	Idaho	KIFI-TV	8.2	2021	News-Press & Gazette Company	
Lewiston	Idaho	KLEW-TV	3	1955	Sinclair Broadcast Group	(Note: Semi-satellite of KIMA-TV.)
Twin Falls	Idaho	KMVT	11	1955	E. W. Scripps Company	
Champaign–Springfield	Illinois	WCIA	3	1953	Nexstar Media Group	
Chicago	Illinois	WBBM-TV	2	1953	CBS News and Stations	
Peoria	Illinois	WMBD-TV	31	1958	Nexstar Media Group	
Quincy	Illinois	KHQA-TV	7	1953	Rincon Broadcasting Group	
Rockford	Illinois	WIFR-LD	23	1965	Gray Media	(Note: Operated as a full-power station until 2017.)
Evansville	Indiana	WEVV-TV	44	1995	Gray Media	
Fort Wayne	Indiana	WANE-TV	15	1954	Nexstar Media Group	
Indianapolis	Indiana	WTTV	4	2015	Nexstar Media Group	
Indianapolis	Indiana	WTTK	29	2015	Nexstar Media Group	(Note: Satellite of WTTV.)
Lafayette	Indiana	WLFI-TV	18	1953	Gray Media	
South Bend	Indiana	WSBT-TV	22	1952	Sinclair Broadcast Group	
Terre Haute	Indiana	WTHI-TV	10	1954	Gray Media	
Cedar Rapids	Iowa	KGAN-TV	2	1953	Sinclair Broadcast Group	
Davenport (Quad Cities)	Iowa	WHBF-TV	4	1950	Nexstar Media Group	
Des Moines	Iowa	KCCI	8	1955	Hearst Television	
Ottumwa	Iowa	KTVO	3.2	2010	Rincon Broadcasting Group	
Sioux City	Iowa	KPTH	44.3	2021	Sinclair Broadcast Group	
Garden City	Kansas	KBSD-DT	6	1961	Gray Media	(Note: Semi-satellite of KWCH-TV.)
Goodland	Kansas	KBSL-DT	10	1958	Gray Media	(Note: Satellite of KWCH-TV.)
Hays	Kansas	KBSH-DT	7	1962	Gray Media	
Topeka	Kansas	WIBW-TV	13	1953	Gray Media	
Wichita	Kansas	KWCH-DT	12	1953	Gray Media	
Bowling Green	Kentucky	WNKY	40.2	2007	Marquee Broadcasting	
Hazard	Kentucky	WYMT-TV	57	1985	Gray Media	(Note: Semi-satellite of WKYT-TV.)
Lexington	Kentucky	WKYT-TV	27	1968	Gray Media	
Louisville	Kentucky	WLKY	32	1990	Hearst Television	
Paducah	Kentucky	KFVS-TV	12	1954	Gray Media	
Alexandria	Louisiana	KALB-TV	5.2	2007	Gray Media	
Baton Rouge	Louisiana	WAFB	9	1953	Gray Media	
Lafayette	Louisiana	KLFY-TV	10	1955	Nexstar Media Group	
Lake Charles	Louisiana	KSWL-LD	17	2017	SagamoreHill Broadcasting	
Monroe	Louisiana	KNOE-TV	8	1953	Gray Media	
New Orleans	Louisiana	WWL-TV	4	1957	Nexstar Media Group	
Shreveport	Louisiana	KSLA	12	1954	Gray Media	
Bangor	Maine	WABI-TV	5	1959	Gray Media	
Portland	Maine	WGME-TV	13	1954	Sinclair Broadcast Group	
Presque Isle	Maine	WAGM-TV	8	1959	Gray Media	
Baltimore	Maryland	WJZ-TV	13	1995	CBS News and Stations	
Salisbury	Maryland	WBOC-TV	16	1955	Draper Holdings Business Trust	
Boston	Massachusetts	WBZ-TV	4	1995	CBS News and Stations	
Springfield	Massachusetts	WSHM-LD	33	2003	Gray Media	(Note: Semi-satellite of WFSB.)
Alpena	Michigan	WBKB-TV	11	1975	Morgan Murphy Media	
Detroit	Michigan	WWJ-TV	62	1994	CBS News and Stations	
Flint	Michigan	WNEM-TV	5	1995	Gray Media	
Grand Rapids	Michigan	WWMT	3	1950	Sinclair Broadcast Group	
Lansing	Michigan	WLNS-TV	6	1950	Nexstar Media Group	
Marquette	Michigan	WZMQ	19.2	2022	Lilly Broadcasting	
Sault Ste. Marie	Michigan	WWUP-TV	10	1962	Heritage Broadcasting Group	(Note: Satellite of WWTV.)
Traverse City	Michigan	WWTV	9	1954	Heritage Broadcasting Group	
Duluth	Minnesota	KBJR-TV	6.2	2016	Gray Media	
Hibbing	Minnesota	KRII	11.2	2016	Gray Media	(Note: Semi-satellite of KBJR-TV)
Mankato	Minnesota	KEYC-TV	12	1961	Gray Media	
Minneapolis–Saint Paul	Minnesota	WCCO-TV	4	1949	CBS News and Stations	
Rochester	Minnesota	KIMT	3	1954	Allen Media Broadcasting	
Walker	Minnesota	KCCW-TV	12	1982	CBS News and Stations	(Note: Satellite of WCCO-TV.)
Biloxi	Mississippi	WLOX	13.2	2012	Gray Media	
Greenwood	Mississippi	WXVT-LD	17	2017	Deltavision Media	
Hattiesburg	Mississippi	WHLT	22	1987	Nexstar Media Group	(Note: Semi-satellite of WJTV.)
Jackson	Mississippi	WAPT	16.4	2026	Hearst Television	
Meridian	Mississippi	WMDN	24	1994	Big Horn Television	(Note: Operated by Coastal Television.)
Tupelo	Mississippi	WCBI-TV	4	1979	Morris Multimedia	
Jefferson City	Missouri	KRCG	13	1955	Sinclair Broadcast Group	
Joplin	Missouri	KOAM-TV	7	1982	Morgan Murphy Media	
Kansas City	Missouri	KCTV	5	1955	Gray Media	
Springfield	Missouri	KOLR	10	1953	Mission Broadcasting	(Note: Operated by Nexstar Media Group.)
St. Joseph	Missouri	KCJO-CD	30	2017	News-Press & Gazette Company	
St. Louis	Missouri	KMOV	4	1954	Gray Media	
Billings	Montana	KTVQ	2	1953	E. W. Scripps Company	
Bozeman	Montana	KBZK	7	2000	E. W. Scripps Company	(Note: Satellite of KXLF-TV.)
Butte	Montana	KXLF-TV	4	1960	E. W. Scripps Company	
Great Falls	Montana	KRTV	3	1984	E. W. Scripps Company	
Helena	Montana	KXLH-LD	9	1969	E. W. Scripps Company	(Note: Semi-satellite of KRTV.)
Kalispell	Montana	KAJJ-CD	18	1985	E. W. Scripps Company	(Note: Semi-satellite of KPAX-TV.)
Missoula	Montana	KPAX-TV	8	1984	E. W. Scripps Company	
Grand Island	Nebraska	KGIN	11	1961	Gray Media	(Note: Satellite of KOLN.)
Lincoln	Nebraska	KOLN	10	1954	Gray Media	
North Platte	Nebraska	KNPL-LD	10	2013	Gray Media	(Note: Semi-satellite of KOLN.)
Omaha	Nebraska	KMTV-TV	3	1986	E. W. Scripps Company	
Scottsbluff	Nebraska	KSTF	10	1984	Marquee Broadcasting	(Note: Satellite of KGWN-TV.)
Las Vegas	Nevada	KLAS-TV	8	1953	Nexstar Media Group	
Reno	Nevada	KTVN	2	1972	Sarkes Tarzian	
Albuquerque	New Mexico	KOAT	7.4	2026	Hearst Television	
Roswell	New Mexico	KBIM-TV	10	1966	Nexstar Media Group	
Albany	New York	WRGB	6	1981	Sinclair Broadcast Group	
Binghamton	New York	WBNG-TV	12	1949	Gray Media	
Buffalo	New York	WIVB-TV	4	1949	Nexstar Media Group	
Elmira	New York	WENY-TV	36.2	2009	Lilly Broadcasting	
New York City	New York	WCBS-TV	2	1941	CBS News and Stations	
Rochester	New York	WROC-TV	8	1989	Nexstar Media Group	
Syracuse	New York	WKOF	15	2025	Sinclair Broadcast Group	
Utica	New York	WKTV	2.2	2015	Heartland Media	
Watertown	New York	WWNY-TV	7	1954	Gray Media	
Charlotte	North Carolina	WBTV	3	1949	Gray Media	
Greensboro	North Carolina	WFMY-TV	2	1949	Nexstar Media Group	
Greenville	North Carolina	WNCT-TV	9	1953	Nexstar Media Group	
Raleigh–Durham	North Carolina	WNCN	17	2016	Nexstar Media Group	
Wilmington	North Carolina	WWAY	3.2	2017	Morris Multimedia	
Bismarck	North Dakota	KBMY	17.2	2026	Forum Communications	
Fargo	North Dakota	KXJB-LD	30	2016	Gray Media	
Minot	North Dakota	KMCY	14.2	2026	Forum Communications	
Cincinnati	Ohio	WKRC-TV	12	1996	Sinclair Broadcast Group	
Cleveland	Ohio	WOIO	19	1994	Gray Media	
Columbus	Ohio	WBNS-TV	10	1949	Nexstar Media Group	
Dayton	Ohio	WHIO-TV	7	1949	Cox Media Group	
Lima	Ohio	WOHL-CD	35.2	2009	Gray Media	
Toledo	Ohio	WTOL	11	1958	Nexstar Media Group	
Youngstown	Ohio	WKBN-TV	27	1953	Nexstar Media Group	
Oklahoma City	Oklahoma	KWTV-DT	9	1953	Griffin Communications	
Tulsa	Oklahoma	KOTV-DT	6	1949	Griffin Communications	
Bend	Oregon	KBNZ-LD	7	2008	Zolo Media	
Coos Bay	Oregon	KCBY-TV	11	1982	Sinclair Broadcast Group	(Note: Satellite of KVAL-TV.)
Eugene	Oregon	KVAL-TV	13	1982	Sinclair Broadcast Group	
Medford	Oregon	KTVL	10	1983	Sinclair Broadcast Group	
Portland	Oregon	KOIN	6	1953	Nexstar Media Group	
Roseburg	Oregon	KPIC	4	1982	Sinclair Broadcast Group	
Erie	Pennsylvania	WSEE-TV	35	1954	Lilly Broadcasting	
Harrisburg	Pennsylvania	WHP-TV	21	1953	Sinclair Broadcast Group	
Johnstown	Pennsylvania	WTAJ-TV	10	1953	Nexstar Media Group	
Philadelphia	Pennsylvania	KYW-TV	3	1995	CBS News and Stations	
Pittsburgh	Pennsylvania	KDKA-TV	2	1956	CBS News and Stations	
Scranton	Pennsylvania	WYOU	22	1953	Mission Broadcasting	
Providence	Rhode Island	WPRI-TV	12	1995	Nexstar Media Group	
Charleston	South Carolina	WCSC-TV	5	1953	Gray Media	
Columbia	South Carolina	WLTX	19	1953	Nexstar Media Group	
Florence	South Carolina	WBTW	13	1954	Nexstar Media Group	
Greenville	South Carolina	WYFF	4.3	2026	Hearst Television	
Florence	South Dakota	KDLO-TV	3	1957	Nexstar Media Group	(Note: Satellite of KELO-TV.)
Pierre	South Dakota	KPLO-TV	6	1957	Nexstar Media Group	
Rapid City	South Dakota	KNBN	21.2	2026	Forum Communications	
Sioux Falls	South Dakota	KELO-TV	11	1957	Nexstar Media Group	
Chattanooga	Tennessee	WDEF-TV	12	1954	Morris Multimedia	
Jackson	Tennessee	WBBJ-TV	7.3	2012	Bahakel Communications	
Johnson City	Tennessee	WJHL-TV	11	1953	Nexstar Media Group	
Knoxville	Tennessee	WVLT-TV	8	1988	Gray Media	
Memphis	Tennessee	WREG-TV	3	1956	Nexstar Media Group	
Nashville	Tennessee	WTVF	5	1954	E. W. Scripps Company	
Abilene	Texas	KTAB-TV	32	1979	Nexstar Media Group	
Amarillo	Texas	KFDA-TV	10	1953	Gray Media	
Austin	Texas	KEYE-TV	42	1995	Sinclair Broadcast Group	
Beaumont–Port Arthur	Texas	KFDM	6	1955	Sinclair Broadcast Group	
Bryan	Texas	KBTX-TV	3	1983	Gray Media	(Note: Semi-satellite of KWTX-TV.)
Corpus Christi	Texas	KZTV	10	1956	SagamoreHill Broadcasting	(Note: Operated by the E. W. Scripps Company.)
Dallas–Fort Worth	Texas	KTVT	11	1995	CBS News and Stations	
El Paso	Texas	KDBC-TV	4	1952	Sinclair Broadcast Group	
Harlingen	Texas	KVEO-TV	23.2	2020	Nexstar Media Group	
Houston	Texas	KHOU	11	1953	Nexstar Media Group	
Laredo	Texas	KYLX-CD	13	2015	Gray Media	
Lubbock	Texas	KLBK-TV	13	1952	Nexstar Media Group	
Midland–Odessa	Texas	KOSA-TV	7	1956	Gray Media	
San Angelo	Texas	KLST	8	1953	Nexstar Media Group	
San Antonio	Texas	KENS	5	1950	Nexstar Media Group	
Sherman	Texas	KXII	12	1977	Gray Media	
Tyler	Texas	KYTX	19	2004	Nexstar Media Group	
Victoria	Texas	KXTS-LD	41	2011	Morgan Murphy Media	
Waco	Texas	KWTX-TV	10	1983	Gray Media	
Wichita Falls	Texas	KAUZ-TV	6	1953	American Spirit Media	(Note: Operated by Gray Media.)
Christiansted	U.S. Virgin Islands	WCVI-TV	23	2019	Lilly Broadcasting	
Salt Lake City	Utah	KUTV	2	1995	Sinclair Broadcast Group	
Burlington	Vermont	WCAX-TV	3	1954	Gray Media	
Charlottesville	Virginia	WCAV	19	2004	Lockwood Broadcast Group	
Harrisonburg	Virginia	WSVF-CD	43.2	2012	Gray Media	
Norfolk	Virginia	WTKR	3	1953	E. W. Scripps Company	
Richmond	Virginia	WTVR-TV	6	1960	E. W. Scripps Company	
Roanoke	Virginia	WDBJ	7	1955	Gray Media	
Kennewick	Washington	KEPR-TV	19	1954	Sinclair Broadcast Group	
Seattle	Washington	KIRO-TV	7	1997	Cox Media Group	
Spokane	Washington	KREM	2	1976	Nexstar Media Group	
Yakima	Washington	KIMA-TV	29	1953	Sinclair Broadcast Group	
Bluefield	West Virginia	WVNS-TV	59	2001	Nexstar Media Group	
Clarksburg	West Virginia	WDTV	5	1967	Gray Media	
Huntington–Charleston	West Virginia	WOWK-TV	13	1986	Nexstar Media Group	
Moorefield	West Virginia	W27EI-D	27	1989	Valley Television Cooperative, Inc.	(Note: Independently-owned translator of WUSA.)
Parkersburg	West Virginia	WIYE-LD	26	2012	Gray Media	
Wheeling	West Virginia	WTRF-TV	7	1980	Nexstar Media Group	
Eau Claire	Wisconsin	WKBT-DT	8	1954	Morgan Murphy Media	
Green Bay	Wisconsin	WFRV-TV	5	1992	Nexstar Media Group	
Madison	Wisconsin	WISC-TV	3	1956	Morgan Murphy Media	
Milwaukee	Wisconsin	WDJT-TV	58	1994	Weigel Broadcasting	
Wausau	Wisconsin	WSAW-TV	7	1954	Gray Media	
Casper	Wyoming	KGWC-TV	14	1980	Big Horn Television	
Cheyenne	Wyoming	KGWN-TV	5	1984	Marquee Broadcasting	
Lander	Wyoming	KGWL-TV	5	1982	Big Horn Television	(Note: Satellite of KGWC-TV.)
Rock Springs	Wyoming	KGWR-TV	13	1982	Big Horn Television	

=== Outside the U.S. ===
Location	Station	Channel	Year of affiliation	Ownership
Hamilton, Bermuda	ZBM-TV	9	1960	Bermuda Broadcasting
Kingstown, St. Vincent and the Grenadines	ZBG-TV	9	—N/a	St. Vincent and the Grenadines Broadcasting Corporation

== See also ==
- List of American Broadcasting Company television affiliates
- List of Fox Broadcasting Company affiliates
- List of NBC television affiliates
- List of PBS member stations
- List of The CW affiliates
