= WSVW-LD =

Television station in Harrisonburg, Virginia

- Harrisonburg–Staunton, Virginia; United States
- City: Harrisonburg, Virginia
- Channels: Digital: 30 (UHF); Virtual: 30
- Branding: NBC 3 in the Valley; 29 News; CW 3 in the Valley (30.3)

Programming
- Affiliations: 30.1: NBC; 30.3: CW+; for others, see § Subchannels

Ownership
- Owner: Gray Media; (Gray Television Licensee, LLC)
- Sister stations: WHSV-TV; WSVF-CD

History
- First air date: June 13, 2011 (as translator of WVIR-TV); December 1, 2019 (as a separate station)
- Former call signs: W30CT-D (2011–2019)
- Former channel numbers: 30 (UHF, 2011–2019)
- Call sign meaning: Disambiguation of sister station WSVF-CD

Technical information
- Licensing authority: FCC
- Facility ID: 168767
- Class: LD
- ERP: 12 kW
- HAAT: 507.6 m (1,665 ft)
- Transmitter coordinates: 38°23′34.8″N 78°46′11.9″W
- Translator(s): W22EX-D Staunton

Links
- Public license information: LMS

WSVW-LD (channel 30) is a low-power television station in Harrisonburg, Virginia, United States, affiliated with NBC and The CW Plus. It is owned by Gray Media alongside ABC affiliate WHSV-TV (channel 3) and Class A dual Fox/CBS affiliate WSVF-CD (channel 43). The three stations share studios on North Main Street (US 11) in downtown Harrisonburg, and operate a newsroom in Fishersville, serving Staunton, Waynesboro, and Augusta County. WSVW-LD's transmitter is located atop Massanutten Mountain. There is no separate website for WSVW-LD; instead, it is integrated with that of sister station WHSV-TV.

W22EX-D (virtual channel 30, UHF digital channel 22) in Staunton operates as a translator of WSVW-LD; this station's transmitter is located atop Elliott Knob west of Staunton.

Even though WSVW-LD and W22EX-D both have digital signals of their own, their low-power broadcast ranges only cover the immediate Harrisonburg and Staunton areas, respectively. Therefore, the NBC-affiliated main feed is simulcast in 1080i full high definition on WHSV-TV's second digital subchannel in order to reach the entire market; this signal can be seen on channel 3.2 from a separate transmitter atop Elliott Knob.

== History ==
The station signed on in June 2011 as W30CT-D, a translator of Charlottesville-based NBC affiliate WVIR-TV (channel 29). W30CT-D was one of two translators of WVIR-TV for the Harrisonburg-Staunton-Waynesboro market, broadcasting from Massanutten Mountain for Harrisonburg. A second translator, W41DT-D (currently W22EX-D), signed on earlier in the year from Elliott Knob to cover the other cities. For years, WVIR had been one of the default NBC affiliates piped into the Shenandoah Valley on cable, along with WRC-TV in Washington, D.C., and WWBT in Richmond.

On March 4, 2019, Waterman Broadcasting announced a deal to sell WVIR-TV, along with W30CT-D and W22EX-D, to Gray Television on that day. Gray already owned CBS-affiliated rival WCAV and ABC affiliate WVAW-LD (channel 16), which were concurrently sold to Lockwood Broadcast Group. WVIR became a sister station to Fox affiliate WAHU-CD (channel 27, now WVIR-CD), which was not included in the sale and retained by Gray to serve as a WVIR-TV translator. The sale was approved on April 15, and the transaction was completed on October 1.

The next day, WVIR-TV's new sister station WHSV-TV announced that it would convert the two translators into separate NBC and CW affiliates for Harrisonburg, effective December 1; concurrently with the announcement, W30CT-D became WSVW-LD. The two stations continue to carry all of WVIR-TV's newscasts, but now air separate syndicated programming outside of network hours.

== Technical information ==
=== Subchannels ===
The station's digital signal is multiplexed:

Subchannels of WSVW-LD and W22EX-D
Channel	Res.	Short name	Programming
30.1	1080i	NBC-HD	NBC
30.2	480i	Outlaw	Outlaw
30.3	720p	CW	The CW Plus
30.4	480i	TrCrime	True Crime Network
30.5	480i	Grit	Grit
30.6	480i	The365	365BLK

=== Translator ===
City of license	Callsign	Channel	ERP	HAAT	Facility ID	Transmitter coordinates
Staunton	W22EX-D	22	15 kW	636.3 m (2,088 ft)	168768	38°09′55.4″N 79°18′43.1″W
