= Fox (TV channel) =

Fox TV channel may refer to:

- Fox (international), a defunct series of international TV channels operated by Fox Networks Group, a division of 21st Century Fox
- Fox Television Stations, a group of TV stations in the United States owned-and-operated by Fox Corporation

== See also ==
- List of Fox Broadcasting Company affiliates (by U.S. state)
