= List of Fox Broadcasting Company affiliates =

The following is a list of affiliates for the Fox Broadcasting Company (Fox), a television network based in the United States. All affiliates owned by the network's Fox Television Stations division are owned-and-operated stations.

Stations are listed in alphabetical order by state, district or territory and media market.

- (**) – Indicates station was a charter network owned-and-operated station in 1986.

== Affiliate stations ==
Fox television network affiliates
Media market	State/Dist./Terr.	Station	Channel	Year affiliated	Ownership	Notes
Birmingham	Alabama	WBRC	6	1996	Gray Media	
Dothan	Alabama	WDFX-TV	34	1991	Lockwood Broadcast Group	
Huntsville	Alabama	WZDX	54	1990	Nexstar Media Group	
Mobile	Alabama	WALA-TV	10	1996	Gray Media	
Montgomery	Alabama	WCOV-TV	20	1986	Gray Media	
Anchorage	Alaska	KTBY	4	1986	Coastal Television Broadcasting Company	
Fairbanks	Alaska	KATN	2.2	2017	Vision Alaska	(Note: Operated by Coastal Television Broadcasting Company.)
Juneau	Alaska	KJUD	8.2	2011	Vision Alaska	
Phoenix	Arizona	KSAZ-TV	10	1994	Fox Television Stations	
Tucson	Arizona	KMSB	11	1986	Nexstar Media Group	(Note: Operated by Gray Media.)
Yuma	Arizona	KECY-TV	9	1995	News-Press & Gazette Company	
Fayetteville	Arkansas	KNWA-TV	51.2	2006	Nexstar Media Group	
Fort Smith	Arkansas	KFTA-TV	24	2006	Nexstar Media Group	
Jonesboro	Arkansas	KJNB-CD	39	2015	Coastal Television Broadcasting Company	
Jonesboro	Arkansas	K22PF-D	42	2015	Coastal Television Broadcasting Company	
Little Rock	Arkansas	KLRT-TV	16	1990	Mission Broadcasting	(Note: Operated by Nexstar Media Group.)
Bakersfield	California	KBFX-CD	58	1995	Sinclair Broadcast Group	
Bakersfield	California	KBAK-TV	58.2	1993	Sinclair Broadcast Group	
Chico–Redding	California	KRCR-TV	7.2	2025	Sinclair Broadcast Group	
Eureka	California	KAEF-TV	23.2	2025	Sinclair Broadcast Group	
Fresno	California	KMPH-TV	26	1988	Sinclair Broadcast Group	
Los Angeles	California	KTTV **	11	1986	Fox Television Stations	
Monterey	California	KION-TV	46.2	2022	News-Press & Gazette Company	
Palm Springs	California	KDFX-CD	33	1990	News-Press & Gazette Company	
Palm Springs	California	KESQ-TV	42.2	1990	News-Press & Gazette Company	
Sacramento	California	KTXL	40	1986	Nexstar Media Group	
San Diego	California	KSWB-TV	69	2008	Nexstar Media Group	
San Francisco	California	KTVU	2	1986	Fox Television Stations	
San Luis Obispo	California	KKFX-CD	24	1998	News-Press & Gazette Company	
San Luis Obispo	California	KCOY-TV	12.2	1998	News-Press & Gazette Company	
Colorado Springs	Colorado	KXRM-TV	21	1986	Nexstar Media Group	
Denver	Colorado	KDVR	31	1986	Nexstar Media Group	
Durango	Colorado	KREZ-TV	6	2017	Nexstar Media Group	(Note: Semi-satellite of KRQE.)
Fort Collins	Colorado	KFCT	22	1994	Nexstar Media Group	(Note: Satellite of KDVR.)
Grand Junction	Colorado	KFQX	4	1993	Mission Broadcasting	
Hartford–New Haven	Connecticut	WTIC-TV	61	1986	Nexstar Media Group	
Washington	District of Columbia	WTTG **	5	1986	Fox Television Stations	
Fort Myers	Florida	WFTX-TV	36	1986	Sun Broadcasting	(Note: Operated by Fort Myers Broadcasting Company.)
Gainesville	Florida	WOGX	51	1991	Fox Television Stations	(Note: Semi-satellite of WOFL.)
Jacksonville	Florida	WFOX-TV	30	1986	Cox Media Group	
Miami–Fort Lauderdale	Florida	WSVN	7	1989	Sunbeam Television	
Orlando	Florida	WOFL	35	1986	Fox Television Stations	
Panama City	Florida	WPGX	28	1988	Lockwood Broadcast Group	
Tallahassee	Florida	WTWC-TV	40.2	2014	Sinclair Broadcast Group	
Tampa	Florida	WTVT	13	1994	Fox Television Stations	
West Palm Beach	Florida	WFLX	29	1986	Gray Media	(Note: Operated by the E. W. Scripps Company.)
Albany	Georgia	WFXL	31	1989	Sinclair Broadcast Group	(Note: Operated by Marquee Broadcasting.)
Atlanta	Georgia	WAGA-TV	5	1994	Fox Television Stations	
Augusta	Georgia	WFXG	54	1990	Lockwood Broadcast Group	
Columbus	Georgia	WXTX	54	1986	American Spirit Media	
Macon	Georgia	WGXA	24	1996	Sinclair Broadcast Group	
Savannah	Georgia	WTGS	28	1986	Sinclair Broadcast Group	
Dededo	Guam	KEQI-LD	22	2004	Lilly Broadcasting	(Note: Operated by Lilly Broadcasting.)
Tamuning	Guam	KTGM	14.2	2025	Lilly Broadcasting	
Hilo	Hawaii	KHAW-TV	11	1996	Nexstar Media Group	(Note: Satellite of KHON.)
Honolulu	Hawaii	KHON-TV	2	1996	Nexstar Media Group	
Wailuku	Hawaii	KAII-TV	7	1996	Nexstar Media Group	
Boise	Idaho	KNIN-TV	9	2011	Marquee Broadcasting	
Idaho Falls	Idaho	KIDK	3.2	2012	VistaWest Media	(Note: Operated by News-Press & Gazette Company.)
Idaho Falls	Idaho	KXPI-LD	3.2	2012	News-Press & Gazette Company	
Twin Falls	Idaho	KMVT	11.3	2012	E. W. Scripps Company	
Twin Falls	Idaho	KSVT-CD	43	2012	E. W. Scripps Company	
Champaign–Springfield	Illinois	WCCU	27	1986	GOCOM Media, LLC	(Note: Operated by Rincon Broadcasting Group.) (Note: Semi-satellite of WRSP-TV.)
Champaign–Springfield	Illinois	WRSP-TV	55	1986	GOCOM Media, LLC	
Chicago	Illinois	WFLD **	32	1986	Fox Television Stations	
Peoria	Illinois	WYZZ-TV	43	1986	Cunningham Broadcasting	
Quincy	Illinois	WGEM-TV	10.3	1994	Gray Media	
Rockford	Illinois	WQRF-TV	39	1989	Nexstar Media Group	
Evansville	Indiana	WEVV-TV	44.2	2011	Gray Media	
Fort Wayne	Indiana	WFFT-TV	55	2013	Gray Media	
Indianapolis	Indiana	WXIN	59	1986	Nexstar Media Group	
Lafayette	Indiana	WPBI-CD	16	2016	Coastal Television Broadcasting Company	
South Bend	Indiana	WSBT-TV	22.2	2016	Sinclair Broadcast Group	
Terre Haute	Indiana	WTHI-TV	10.2	2011	Gray Media	
Cedar Rapids	Iowa	KGAN	2.2	2021	Sinclair Broadcast Group	
Davenport	Iowa	KLJB	18	1990	Mission Broadcasting	
Des Moines	Iowa	KDSM-TV	17	1986	Sinclair Broadcast Group	
Ottumwa	Iowa	KYOU-TV	15	1992	Gray Media	
Sioux City	Iowa	KPTH	44	1999	Sinclair Broadcast Group	
Garden City	Kansas	KAAS-TV	17	1988	Sinclair Broadcast Group	(Note: Satellite of KSAS-TV.)
Garden City	Kansas	KSAS-LP	17	1988	Sinclair Broadcast Group	
Hays	Kansas	KOCW	14	2000	Sinclair Broadcast Group	
Topeka	Kansas	KSNT	27.2	1989	Nexstar Media Group	
Topeka	Kansas	KTMJ-CD	43	1989	Nexstar Media Group	
Wichita	Kansas	KSAS-TV	24	1986	Sinclair Broadcast Group	
Bowling Green	Kentucky	WBKO	13.2	2006	Gray Media	
Lexington	Kentucky	WDKY-TV	56	1986	Nexstar Media Group	
Louisville	Kentucky	WDRB	41	1987	Gray Media	
Paducah	Kentucky	KBSI	23	1986	Standard Media	
Alexandria	Louisiana	WNTZ-TV	48	1991	Nexstar Media Group	
Baton Rouge	Louisiana	WGMB-TV	44	1991	Nexstar Media Group	
Lafayette	Louisiana	KADN-TV	15	1986	Gray Media	
Lake Charles	Louisiana	KVHP	29	1986	American Spirit Media	
Monroe	Louisiana	KARD	14	1994	Nexstar Media Group	
New Orleans	Louisiana	WVUE-DT	8	1996	Gray Media	
Shreveport	Louisiana	KMSS-TV	33	1986	Mission Broadcasting	
Bangor	Maine	WFVX-LD	22	2003	Rockfleet Broadcasting	
Bangor	Maine	WVII-TV	7.2	2009	Rockfleet Broadcasting	
Portland	Maine	WGME-TV	13.2	2025	Sinclair Broadcast Group	
Presque Isle	Maine	WAGM-TV	8.2	2017	Gray Media	
Baltimore	Maryland	WBFF	45	1986	Sinclair Broadcast Group	
Salisbury	Maryland	WBOC-TV	21.2	2006	Draper Holdings Business Trust	
Boston	Massachusetts	WFXT	25	1986	Cox Media Group	
Springfield	Massachusetts	WGGB-TV	40.2	2008	Gray Media	
Alpena	Michigan	WBKB-TV	11.4	2022	Morgan Murphy Media	
Detroit	Michigan	WJBK	2	1994	Fox Television Stations	
Flint	Michigan	WSMH	66	1986	Sinclair Broadcast Group	
Grand Rapids	Michigan	WXMI	17	1986	E. W. Scripps Company	
Lansing	Michigan	WSYM-TV	47	1990	Gray Media	
Marquette	Michigan	WLUC-TV	6.2	2009	Gray Media	
Sault Ste. Marie	Michigan	WFUP	45	1993	Cadillac Telecasting	(Note: Operated by Heritage Broadcasting Group.) (Note: Satellite of WFQX.)
Traverse City	Michigan	WFQX-TV	32	1990	Cadillac Telecasting	
Bemidji	Minnesota	KFTC	26	1999	Fox Television Stations	(Note: Satellite of KMSP-TV and WFTC.)
Duluth	Minnesota	KQDS-TV	21	1999	Coastal Television Broadcasting Company	
Mankato	Minnesota	KEYC-TV	12.2	2007	Gray Media	
Minneapolis–Saint Paul	Minnesota	KMSP-TV	9	2002	Fox Television Stations	
Rochester	Minnesota	KXLT-TV	47	1998	Gray Media	
Biloxi	Mississippi	WXXV-TV	25	1986	Morris Multimedia	
Greenwood	Mississippi	WABG-TV	6.2	2006	Deltavision Media	
Hattiesburg	Mississippi	WHPM-LD	23	2011	Waypoint Media	
Jackson	Mississippi	WDBD	40	2006	American Spirit Media	
Meridian	Mississippi	WGBC	30	2009	Coastal Television Broadcasting Company	
Tupelo	Mississippi	WCBI-TV	4.2	2024	Morris Multimedia	
Jefferson City	Missouri	KQFX-LD	22	1997	News-Press & Gazette Company	
Joplin	Missouri	KFJX	14	2003	SagamoreHill Broadcasting	(Note: Operated by Morgan Murphy Media.)
Kansas City	Missouri	WDAF-TV	4	1994	Nexstar Media Group	
Springfield	Missouri	KRBK	49	2011	Nexstar Media Group	
St. Joseph	Missouri	KNPN-CD	26	2012	News-Press & Gazette Company	
St. Louis	Missouri	KTVI	2	1995	Nexstar Media Group	
Billings	Montana	KHMT	4	1995	Mission Broadcasting	
Bozeman	Montana	KWYB-LD	28	1996	Cowles Company	(Note: Translator of KWYB.)
Butte	Montana	KWYB	18.2	2000	Cowles Company	
Great Falls	Montana	KFBB-TV	5.2	2009	Cowles Company	
Helena	Montana	KHBB-LD	21.2	2008	Cowles Company	
Missoula	Montana	KTMF	23.2	2009	Cowles Company	
Hayes Center	Nebraska	KWNB-TV	6.2	2009	Sinclair Broadcast Group	
Lincoln	Nebraska	KFXL-TV	51	2009	Sinclair Broadcast Group	
North Platte	Nebraska	KIIT-CD	11	2001	Gray Media	
North Platte	Nebraska	KNOP-TV	2.2	2001	Gray Media	
Omaha	Nebraska	KPTM	42	1988	Sinclair Broadcast Group	
Las Vegas	Nevada	KVVU-TV	5	1986	Gray Media	
Reno	Nevada	KRXI-TV	11	1995	Sinclair Broadcast Group	
Albuquerque	New Mexico	KRQE	13	2017	Nexstar Media Group	
Roswell	New Mexico	KBIM-TV	10	2017	Nexstar Media Group	(Note: Semi-satellite of KRQE.)
Albany	New York	WXXA-TV	23	1986	Mission Broadcasting	
Binghamton	New York	WICZ-TV	40	1996	Deltavision Media	
Buffalo	New York	WUTV	29	1990	Sinclair Broadcast Group	
Elmira	New York	WYDC	48	1996	Coastal Television Broadcasting Company	
New York City	New York	WNYW **	5	1986	Fox Television Stations	
Rochester	New York	WUHF	31	1986	Sinclair Broadcast Group	
Syracuse	New York	WSYT-TV	68	1986	Deltavision Media	
Utica	New York	WFXV	33	1986	Nexstar Media Group	
Watertown	New York	WNYF-CD	28	2001	Gray Media	
Watertown	New York	WWNY-TV	7.2	2001	Gray Media	
Charlotte	North Carolina	WJZY	46	2013	Nexstar Media Group	
Greensboro	North Carolina	WGHP	8	1995	Nexstar Media Group	
New Bern	North Carolina	WCTI-TV	12.2	2025	Sinclair Broadcast Group	
Raleigh–Durham	North Carolina	WRAZ	50	1998	Capitol Broadcasting Company	
Wilmington	North Carolina	WSFX-TV	26	1994	American Spirit Media	
Bismarck	North Dakota	KFYR-TV	5.2	2014	Gray Media	
Dickinson	North Dakota	KQCD-TV	7.2	2014	Gray Media	(Note: Semi-satellite of KFYR-TV.)
Fargo	North Dakota	KJRR	7	1986	Coastal Television Broadcasting Company	(Note: Satellite of KVRR.)
Fargo	North Dakota	KVRR	15	1986	Coastal Television Broadcasting Company	
Grand Forks	North Dakota	KBRR	10	1986	Coastal Television	
Minot	North Dakota	KMOT	10.2	2014	Gray Media	
Pembina	North Dakota	KNRR	12	1986	Coastal Television	
Williston	North Dakota	KUMV-TV	8.2	2014	Gray Media	(Note: Semi-satellite of KMOT.)
Cincinnati	Ohio	WXIX-TV	19	1986	Gray Media	
Cleveland	Ohio	WJW	8	1994	Nexstar Media Group	
Columbus	Ohio	WSYX	6.3	2021	Sinclair Broadcast Group	
Dayton	Ohio	WKEF	22.2	2021	Sinclair Broadcast Group	
Lima	Ohio	WLIO	8.2	2009	Gray Media	
Toledo	Ohio	WUPW	36	1986	American Spirit Media	
Youngstown	Ohio	WYFX-LD	62	1998	Nexstar Media Group	
Youngstown	Ohio	WKBN-TV	27.2	1998	Nexstar Media Group	
Zanesville	Ohio	WHIZ-TV	18.2	2022	Marquee Broadcasting	
Bend	Oregon	KFXO-CD	39	1993	News-Press & Gazette Company	
Bend	Oregon	KTVZ	21.4	1993	News-Press & Gazette Company	
Eugene	Oregon	KLSR-TV	34	1988	Cox Media Group	
Medford	Oregon	KMVU-DT	26	1994	Marquee Broadcasting	
Portland	Oregon	KPTV	12	2002	Gray Media	
Oklahoma City	Oklahoma	KOKH-TV	25	1990	Sinclair Broadcast Group	
Tulsa	Oklahoma	KTUL	8.2	2026	Sinclair Broadcast Group	
Erie	Pennsylvania	WFXP	66	1986	Mission Broadcasting	
Harrisburg	Pennsylvania	WPMT	43	1986	Nexstar Media Group	
Johnstown	Pennsylvania	WATM-TV	23.2	2009	Palm Television	(Note: Operated by Cunningham Broadcasting and Sinclair Broadcast Group.)
Johnstown	Pennsylvania	WWCP-TV	8	1986	Cunningham Broadcasting	(Note: Operated by Sinclair Broadcast Group.)
Philadelphia	Pennsylvania	WTXF-TV	29	1986	Fox Television Stations	
Pittsburgh	Pennsylvania	WPGH-TV	53	1986	Sinclair Broadcast Group	
Scranton	Pennsylvania	WOLF-TV	56	1986	New Age Media	
Aguadilla	Puerto Rico	WSJP-LD	26	2015	Lilly Broadcasting	
Providence	Rhode Island	WNAC-TV	64	1986	Mission Broadcasting	
Charleston	South Carolina	WTAT-TV	24	1986	Cunningham Broadcasting	
Columbia	South Carolina	WACH	57	1988	Sinclair Broadcast Group	
Greenville	South Carolina	WHNS	21	1988	Gray Media	
Myrtle Beach	South Carolina	WFXB	43	1997	Bahakel Communications	
Lead	South Dakota	KHSD-TV	11.2	2016	Gray Media	
Mitchell	South Dakota	KDLV-TV	5.2	2020	Gray Media	(Note: Satellite of KDLT-TV.)
Rapid City	South Dakota	KEVN-LD	7	2016	Gray Media	
Rapid City	South Dakota	KOTA-TV	7	2016	Gray Media	(Note: Translator of KEVN-LD.)
Sioux Falls	South Dakota	KDLT-TV	46.2	2020	Gray Media	
Chattanooga	Tennessee	WTVC	9.2	2015	Sinclair Broadcast Group	
Jackson	Tennessee	WJKT	16	2006	Nexstar Media Group	
Johnson City	Tennessee	WCYB-TV	5.3	2025	Sinclair Broadcast Group	
Knoxville	Tennessee	WTNZ	43	1986	Lockwood Broadcast Group	
Memphis	Tennessee	WHBQ-TV	13	1995	Rincon Broadcasting Group	
Nashville	Tennessee	WZTV	17	1990	Sinclair Broadcast Group	
Abilene	Texas	KXVA	15	2001	Nexstar Media Group	
Amarillo	Texas	KCIT	14	1986	Mission Broadcasting	
Austin	Texas	KTBC	7	1995	Fox Television Stations	
Beaumont–Port Arthur	Texas	KFDM	6.3	2021	Sinclair Broadcast Group	
Bryan	Texas	KYLE-TV	28.2	1986	Nexstar Media Group	
Corpus Christi	Texas	KSCC	38	2008	Sinclair Broadcast Group	
Dallas–Fort Worth	Texas	KDFW	4	1995	Fox Television Stations	
El Paso	Texas	KFOX-TV	14	1986	Sinclair Broadcast Group	
Harlingen	Texas	KFXV	60	2020	Entravision Communications	
Harlingen	Texas	KMBH-LD	67	2012	Entravision Communications	(Note: Satellite of KFXV.)
Harlingen	Texas	KXFX-CD	20	2012	Entravision Communications	
Houston	Texas	KRIV **	26	1986	Fox Television Stations	
Laredo	Texas	KXOF-CD	31	2018	Entravision Communications	
Lubbock	Texas	KJTV-TV	34	1986	Gray Media	
Midland–Odessa	Texas	KPEJ-TV	24	1990	Mission Broadcasting	
San Angelo	Texas	KIDY	6	1986	Nexstar Media Group	
San Antonio	Texas	KABB	29	1995	Sinclair Broadcast Group	
Sherman	Texas	KXII	12.3	2006	Gray Media	
Tyler	Texas	KFXK-TV	51	1991	White Knight Broadcasting	
Victoria	Texas	KVCT	19	1994	SagamoreHill Broadcasting	
Waco	Texas	KWKT-TV	44	1986	Nexstar Media Group	
Wichita Falls	Texas	KJTL	18	1986	Mission Broadcasting	
Charlotte Amalie	U.S. Virgin Islands	WVXF	17.2	2014	Lilly Broadcasting	
Salt Lake City	Utah	KSTU	13	1986	E. W. Scripps Company	
Burlington	Vermont	WFFF-TV	44	1997	Nexstar Media Group	
Charlottesville	Virginia	WCAV	27.2	2019	Lockwood Broadcast Group	
Harrisonburg	Virginia	WSVF-CD	43	2012	Gray Media	
Lynchburg	Virginia	WWCW	21.2	1986	Nexstar Media Group	(Note: Satellite of WFXR.)
Norfolk	Virginia	WVBT	43	1998	Nexstar Media Group	
Richmond	Virginia	WRLH-TV	35	1986	Sinclair Broadcast Group	
Roanoke	Virginia	WFXR	27	1992	Nexstar Media Group	
Pasco	Washington	KEPR-TV	19.3	2026	Sinclair Broadcasting Group	(Note: Translator of KIMA-DT3.)
Seattle	Washington	KCPQ	13	1986	Fox Television Stations	
Spokane	Washington	KAYU-TV	28	1986	Rincon Broadcasting Group	
Yakima	Washington	KIMA-TV	29.3	2026	Sinclair Broadcasting Group	
Bluefield	West Virginia	WVNS-TV	59.2	2006	Nexstar Media Group	
Clarksburg	West Virginia	WVFX	10	1998	Gray Media	
Huntington–Charleston	West Virginia	WCHS-TV	8.2	2021	Sinclair Broadcast Group	
Moorefield	West Virginia	W24ES-D	5	—N/a	Valley Television Cooperative, Inc.	(Note: Independently owned translator of WTTG-TV.)
Parkersburg	West Virginia	WOVA-CD	22	2012	Gray Media	
Wheeling	West Virginia	WTOV-TV	9.2	2014	Sinclair Broadcast Group	
Eau Claire	Wisconsin	WEUX	48	1993	Nexstar Media Group	(Note: Satellite of WLAX.)
Eau Claire	Wisconsin	WLAX	25	1986	Nexstar Media Group	
Green Bay	Wisconsin	WLUK-TV	11	1995	Sinclair Broadcast Group	
Madison	Wisconsin	WMSN-TV	47	1986	Sinclair Broadcast Group	
Milwaukee	Wisconsin	WITI	6	1994	Fox Television Stations	
Wausau	Wisconsin	WZAW-LD	33	2015	Gray Media	
Wausau	Wisconsin	WSAW-TV	7.3	2015	Gray Media	
Casper	Wyoming	KFNB	20	2004	Coastal Television Broadcasting Company	
Cheyenne	Wyoming	KLWY	27	1986	Coastal Television Broadcasting Company	
Rawlins	Wyoming	KFNR	9	2004	Coastal Television Broadcasting Company	(Note: Satellite of KFNB.)
Shoshoni	Wyoming	KFNE	10	2004	Coastal Television Broadcasting Company	

== See also ==
- List of American Broadcasting Company television affiliates
- List of CBS television affiliates
- List of NBC television affiliates
- List of PBS member stations
- List of The CW affiliates
- List of MyNetworkTV affiliates
