= WHSV-TV =

Television station in Harrisonburg, Virginia

- Harrisonburg–Staunton, Virginia; United States
- City: Harrisonburg, Virginia
- Channels: Digital: 20 (UHF); Virtual: 3
- Branding: WHSV; WHSV News; WSVW 3 in the Valley (3.2); MeTV on MyValley (3.4); CBS The V (3.5)

Programming
- Affiliations: 3.1: ABC; 3.2: NBC; 3.5: CBS; for others, see § Subchannels

Ownership
- Owner: Gray Media; (Gray Television Licensee, LLC)
- Sister stations: WSVF-CD; WSVW-LD

History
- First air date: October 1953 (Note: The station's sign-on date is disputed; the Broadcasting and Cable Yearbook says October 19, the Television and Cable Factbook says October 9, and the station's history cards say October 12.)
- Former call signs: WSVA-TV (1953–1976)
- Former channel numbers: Analog: 3 (VHF, 1953–2009); Digital: 49 (UHF, 2006–2018)
- Former affiliations: NBC (1953–1968); DuMont (1953–1956); CBS (secondary, 1953–1963); NBC (secondary, 1968–1975); Fox (secondary, 1994–1996)
- Call sign meaning: Harrisonburg, Shenandoah Valley

Technical information
- Licensing authority: FCC
- Facility ID: 4688
- ERP: 271 kW
- HAAT: 666.1 m (2,185 ft)
- Transmitter coordinates: 38°9′55.8″N 79°18′44.9″W
- Translator(s): 24 (UHF) Winchester; 25 (UHF) Broadway; 28 (UHF) Luray; W33EJ-D 33 (UHF) Moorefield; 34 (UHF) Massanutten

Links
- Public license information: Public file; LMS
- Website: www.whsv.com

WHSV-TV (channel 3) is a television station in Harrisonburg, Virginia, United States, affiliated with ABC. It is owned by Gray Media alongside two low-power stations: Class A dual Fox/CBS affiliate WSVF-CD (channel 43) and dual NBC/CW+ affiliate WSVW-LD (channel 30). The three stations share studios on North Main Street (US 11) in downtown Harrisonburg, and operate a newsroom in Fishersville, serving Staunton, Waynesboro, and Augusta County. WHSV-TV's transmitter is located at Elliott Knob west of Staunton.

WHSV-TV operates four fill-in digital translators: on UHF channel 24 on Signal Knob near Strasburg, serving the Winchester−Front Royal area (in the Washington, D.C., television market); on channel 25 licensed to Broadway and covering Woodstock and Mt. Jackson; on channel 28 licensed to Luray and covering Page County; and on channel 34 licensed to Massanutten and covering Harrisonburg. Its signal is also relayed in Moorefield, West Virginia, on low-power translator W33EJ-D, which is owned by Valley TV Cooperative, Inc.

As of December 1, 2019, WHSV is used to provide full-market over-the-air coverage of WSVW-LD (simulcast over WHSV-DT2) and WSVF-CD2 (simulcast over WHSV-DT5); however, only the WSVW-LD simulcast is aired in high definition.

== History ==
=== Early years ===
Channel 3 signed on in October 1953, as WSVA-TV (for "We Serve Virginia Agriculture"). It was owned by Harrisonburg businessman Frederick L. Allman and his Shenandoah Valley Broadcasting Corporation along with WSVA radio (AM 550 and FM 100.7, now WQPO). The station was a primary NBC affiliate, with secondary CBS and ABC affiliations. The station also carried DuMont programs. It was the only commercial station between Richmond and Roanoke until WVIR-TV signed on from Charlottesville in 1973. Although it was owned by one of Virginia's leading broadcasters, WSVA-TV operated on a shoestring budget. Station engineers switched to and from the signals of the three network affiliates in Washington, D.C. because it was unable to afford direct network feeds. The station did not air any locally produced programs (except for local newscasts) until 1956, when it built a studio along U.S. Route 33 in unincorporated Rockingham County. That year, Allman sold the WSVA stations to Transcontinent Television of Buffalo, New York, with NBC executive Hamilton Shea as a minority partner. Allman earned a handsome return on his original investment in WSVA radio in 1935. In 1959, the Washington Evening Star, owner of WMAL AM-FM-TV in Washington, acquired Transcontinent's controlling interest, as well as 1% of Shea's stake. The CBS affiliation was dropped in 1963.

WSVA-TV logo, circa 1970.

In 1965, the Star sold the WSVA stations to James Gilmore Jr., a Michigan businessman; the sale was necessary because WMAL-TV's new tall tower would have caused a large grade B overlap with WSVA-TV. Under Gilmore's ownership, the station became a primary ABC affiliate in 1968. This was a very unusual move since, then as now, it was the only station in its market; ABC was not nearly on par with CBS and NBC in the ratings at the time (and would not be until the 1970s). It picked up NBC's morning program Today from 1968 until ABC debuted Good Morning America in 1975, but only aired the second hour of Today since the station did not sign on until 8 a.m. (a practice that continued well into the 1970s). Despite wealthier ownership, it was still unable to get a network feed. Occasionally, channel 3 accidentally aired WMAL-TV's commercials when engineers forgot to switch from WMAL-TV's signal during local breaks.

In 1975, channel 3 dropped the remaining NBC programs from its schedule. Gilmore sold WSVA-TV to Charlottesville-based Worrell Newspapers, publisher of The Daily Progress of Charlottesville, in 1976. Later that year, the station assumed its current WHSV-TV callsign. Under Worrell, the station was finally able to acquire a direct network feed. WHSV launched a translator on UHF channel 64 in Charlottesville in 1979. WHSV marked Worrell's entry into broadcasting; the company would subsequently add WIFR-TV in Rockford, Illinois, and WBNB-TV in the U.S. Virgin Islands to its group before selling the three stations to Benedek Broadcasting in 1986.

=== Since 1990s ===
In 1994, Fox approached WHSV regarding a secondary affiliation to provide over-the-air access to the network's new NFL coverage, including most games of the regional Washington Redskins (now the Washington Commanders). WHSV signed a two-year contract and did not renew it after the 1995–96 season due to unsatisfactory ratings. This did not pose as much of a problem as it seemed on paper, as WTTG in Washington was (and still is) available on cable in the area. Construction of a new broadcast facility in downtown Harrisonburg began in 1998, with WHSV relocating there in the spring of 1999.

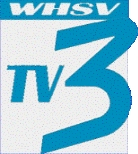
WHSV-TV logo, used from 1996 to 1999.

Benedek went bankrupt in 2002, and most of its stations, including WHSV, were bought by Gray Television. A 5 p.m. weekday newscast was also added that same year. At that time, a new set was constructed in the station's Augusta County newsroom in Staunton. The streetside set featured a window overlooking downtown Staunton along West Frederick Street. The 5 p.m. weekday newscast became WHSV's first newscast to originate from the Augusta County Newsroom. In October 2003, WHSV began originating its 5 p.m. newscast from both Harrisonburg and Staunton. WHSV's 6 p.m. weekday newscast also originated from both Staunton and Harrisonburg for a brief period in the spring of 2004. During that time, WHSV's 6 p.m. weekday newscast featured three anchors. The three-anchor, dual-city format was abandoned after a few months.

WHSV logo, used from 1999 to 2006.

In August 2004, WHSV management began providing managerial, sales and human resources support to Gray Television's upstart CBS affiliate WCAV in Charlottesville. Several members of WHSV's news and production staff transferred to WCAV following its launch. That same year, WHSV's Charlottesville translator was broken off as a separate station serving as the market's ABC affiliate, WVAW-LP on channel 16.

To this day, WHSV remains the only full-power commercial station in the Shenandoah Valley. This is due to the area's small population, as well as the fact that virtually all of the market is located in the United States National Radio Quiet Zone. Low-power sister stations WSVF-CD and WSVW-LD now provide complete major-network service to the market. However, cable television providers still supplement the area with stations from Washington, Richmond or Charlottesville, depending on the location.

== Subchannel history ==
=== WHSV-DT3 ===
WHSV-DT3 is the Ion Television-affiliated third digital subchannel of WHSV-TV, broadcasting in 16:9 widescreen standard definition on channel 3.3.

On March 5, 2007, WHSV launched "TV3 Winchester", an ABC affiliate for Winchester, Virginia. The station was a joint project between WHSV and Shenandoah University. Along with Winchester, the station served Frederick, Clarke, Warren and Shenandoah counties in Virginia. Although TV3 Winchester transmitted an over-the-air signal on WHSV-DT3, it could only be seen on cable in its primary coverage area. TV3 Winchester ceased operations on December 5, 2013; WHSV-DT3 remained vacant until October 2018 when a standard definition feed of Ion Television was eventually added to that subchannel.

=== WHSV-DT4 ===
WHSV-DT4 is the dual MyNetworkTV/MeTV-affiliated fourth digital subchannel of WHSV-TV, broadcasting in 16:9 widescreen standard definition on channel 3.4. Outside MyNetworkTV programming, there is no syndicated fare since MeTV takes up all of the remaining broadcasting time.

A new transmitter tower was built behind WHSV's Harrisonburg studios to accommodate the additional satellite receivers needed for both channels. The station began broadcasting on the date of MyNetworkTV's launch, September 5, 2006. The CW affiliation for the market went to Charlottesville-based NBC affiliate WVIR-TV which broadcasts the network on a third digital subchannel through The CW Plus programming service. On September 24, 2012, WHSV-DT4 added a secondary affiliation with the Weigel-owned classic television network MeTV, with the network's programming replacing syndicated programs previously seen outside of MyNetworkTV's prime time schedule.

==== Newscasts ====
WHSV-DT4 does not carry any live newscasts produced by WHSV that are exclusive to the subchannel. Rather, it airs repeats of newscasts seen on the main channel including the two-hour weekday morning show (at 7) and the nightly 6 o'clock broadcast (at 7). The subchannel also simulcasts the weeknight half-hour prime time newscast at 10 from Fox affiliate WSVF-CD. Even if this program is delayed or preempted on the Fox station, it still airs in the regular time slot on WHSV-DT4. In addition, this subchannel may occasionally air WHSV's 11 p.m. newscast normally seen on the main channel on Saturday evenings in the event there are delays or a preemption due to ABC sports programming. The 10 o'clock program maintains a dedicated news anchor and reporter separate from newscasts on WHSV.

== Local programming ==
In addition to its local newscasts and ABC network programs, WHSV produces other locally produced programs: The Endzone is a 40-minute sports highlight program covering high school football games across the Shenandoah Valley that airs Fridays at 11:25 p.m. during the high school football season. Sports X-tra is an online sports discussion show produced by WHSV's sports department, covering sports news from the previous week.

The station also produces the Sunday morning religious program Light for Today, which broadcasts from People's Baptist Church in Harrisonburg, and broadcasts the music and variety show Virginia Dreams Centerstage. WHSV also sponsored an annual singing competition called "Voice of the Valley", an idea that was originated by former WHSV personality Jenelle Smith. Finalists are unveiled during the station's noon newscasts the week of the Rockingham County Fair with an hour-long live finale that is broadcast from the fair.

=== News operation ===
The station's weekday morning newscast, WHSV News Daybreak, has received recognition as one of the highest-rated local morning news programs in the United States. WHSV utilizes Facebook and Twitter accounts to relay local news stories through social media.

In the early 1990s, the station began producing a midday newscast at noon on weekdays. WHSV-TV purchased its first microwave live truck in 2004. Prior to that, the station relied on rented equipment for remote broadcasts. Since 2004, WHSV-TV has purchased additional microwave equipment for use by its news department.

2006 was a year of significant change at WHSV-TV. First on February 27, 2006, WHSV's weekday morning newscast expanded from a 90-minute program to a two-hour program with the addition of a half-hour at 5 a.m.; this coincided with the debut of new weather technology purchased from Weather Services International. The station's Harrisonburg and Augusta County news bureaus underwent a dramatic overhaul in April 2006, with the addition of new sets and studio camera equipment. WHSV newscasts were broadcast from a temporary studio in the Harrisonburg newsroom during the two-week construction period with the new sets debuting on April 24, 2006 (portions of WHSV's previous set, built in 1999, were donated to nearby Turner Ashby High School). News director Van Hackett, who joined the station in December 2003, retired in August 2006 and was succeeded by former WHSV reporter Ed Reams, who left a job at WDSU in New Orleans to return to the Shenandoah Valley. On July 21, 2006, popular weather anchor Jay Webb left after six years with the station, accepting a job with WDBJ in Roanoke, Virginia. Webb enjoyed a week-long send-off from his on-air colleagues before his final WHSV broadcast on July 21.

On October 30, 2006, WHSV-TV dropped The Andy Griffith Show from its longtime 5:30 p.m. timeslot in favor of a half-hour newscast anchored by longtime reporter Melanie Lofton. This coincided with the debut of a new logo for the station, the retitling of the station's newscasts as WHSV News 3 and updated graphics for its newscasts.

On April 7, 2008, the station's 5 and 5:30 p.m. newscasts began featuring a three-anchor lineup consisting of Melanie Lofton, Bob Corso and meteorologist Tracy Turner. This new format came along with a new arrangement of the newscast.

On December 5, 2013, TV3 Winchester ceased its news operation.

=== Notable former on-air staff ===
- Julie Banderas
- Keith Jones

== Technical information ==
=== Subchannels ===
The station's digital signal is multiplexed:

Subchannels of WHSV-TV
Subchannel	Res.	Short name	Programming
3.1	720p	ABC-HD	ABC
3.2	1080i	NBC-HD	NBC (WSVW-LD)
3.3	480i	ION-SD	Ion (4:3)
3.4	480i	MeTV-SD	MyNetworkTV & MeTV
3.5	480i	CBS-SD	CBS (WSVF-CD2) in SD
3.6	480i	Outlaw	Outlaw

Simulcast of subchannels of another station

=== Translators ===
- WHSV-TV (DRT) 25 Broadway
- WHSV-TV (DRT) 28 Luray
- WHSV-TV (DRT) 34 Massanutten
- WHSV-TV (DRT) 24 Winchester
- W33EJ-D 33 Moorefield, WV

During the late summer and early fall of 2006, WHSV underwent major technical upgrades to make way for the station's new digital subchannels. A new transmitter tower was built behind the station's Harrisonburg studios to accommodate the additional satellite receivers needed for WHSV's Fox and MyNetworkTV-affiliated subchannels. WHSV's main analog transmitter was replaced during the week of August 31, 2006. Broadcasts were only available to viewers with cable while the transmitter was being replaced.

On January 16, 2008, WHSV reached a carriage agreement with DirecTV to add WHSV, and its Fox and MyNetworkTV-affiliated digital subchannels to the satellite providers' local channel lineup.

WHSV originally planned on turning off its analog transmitter of February 17, 2009, the original deadline of the federally mandated digital conversion. The station restored the signal the following Friday however, because several translator stations in communities such as Bergton that are owned by local cooperatives and county governments were unable to convert their transmitters to reconvert the digital signal into analog form, along with viewers who could receive the channel 3 signal well on analog, but not at all digitally. WHSV's broadcasts became digital-only, effective June 12, 2009.

=== Spectrum reallocation, move to Staunton ===
As part of the 2016–17 spectrum reallocation auction, channels 38 through 51 were removed from television broadcasting. WHSV's channel 49 primary digital signal moved to channel 20 and relocated from its longtime site at Big Mountain near New Market to Elliott Knob overlooking Staunton, where it operated a fill-in translator. The National Radio Astronomy Observatory (NRAO) objected to WHSV's continued operation from Big Mountain unless the effective radiated power in its direction was reduced to 0.2 watts, which Gray claimed would have resulted in an unusable signal in Harrisonburg.

Gray proposed a series of engineering changes and new translators to make up for lost coverage in the northern part of the Shenandoah Valley. The existing translator on channel 42 from Signal Knob near Front Royal, which was entirely directed toward Winchester, moved to channel 24 and became less directional in order to also cover the valley. Gray converted the existing main transmitter site on Big Mountain to a translator on channel 28, allowing it to comply with the NRAO's objection by reorienting its signal to transmit to the east, toward Page County. It has also applied for two other new translators: one directly across the valley from Big Mountain, on channel 15 from North Mountain in Broadway, and another on channel 34 from Massanutten Peak overlooking Harrisonburg, which has been built and signed on.

Gray applied for a waiver to begin operations from Elliott Knob by August 31, 2018, nearly two years before its original March 2020 deadline. Although the waiver was not yet approved, WHSV-TV announced the switch-over date as September 10 at midnight. When this date passed without approval, Gray reapplied to move WHSV's transition date to December 2018. The switch-over was completed on December 7.
