= WVIR-TV =

Television station in Charlottesville, Virginia

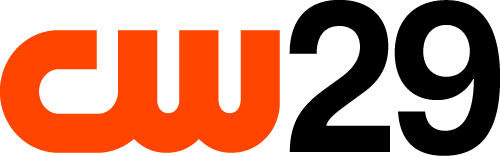
- Charlottesville, Virginia; United States
- Channels: Digital: 2 (VHF); Virtual: 29
- Branding: 29 News; CW 29 (29.3)

Programming
- Affiliations: 29.1: NBC; 29.3: CW+; for others, see § Subchannels

Ownership
- Owner: Gray Media; (Gray Television Licensee, LLC)

History
- First air date: March 11, 1973
- Former channel numbers: Analog: 29 (UHF, 1973–2009); Digital: 32 (UHF, 2002–2019); 19 (UHF, 2019–2020)
- Call sign meaning: Virginia

Technical information
- Licensing authority: FCC
- Facility ID: 70309
- ERP: 10 kW (licensed); 34 kW (STA)
- HAAT: 367.9 m (1,207 ft)
- Transmitter coordinates: 37°59′1″N 78°28′53″W
- Translator(s): WVIR-CD 35 Charlottesville; 30 (UHF) Madison

Links
- Public license information: Public file; LMS
- Website: www.29news.com

WVIR-TV (channel 29) is a television station in Charlottesville, Virginia, United States, affiliated with NBC and The CW Plus. Owned by Gray Media, the station has studios on East Market Street (US 250 Business) in downtown Charlottesville, and its primary transmitter is located on Carters Mountain south of the city.

WVIR-TV began broadcasting as the first television station in Charlottesville on March 11, 1973. Despite numerous attempts as early as 1952, it took Charlottesville considerable time to develop a local TV station in part because half the city sits in the United States National Radio Quiet Zone, which constricted acceptable broadcast facilities in the region. In part as a result, it remained the only full-service commercial television station in Charlottesville for 31 years after being built and came to dominate the market. Waterman Broadcasting acquired the station in 1986 and would later lead the station through digitalization, the addition of the CW subchannel, and the introduction of high-definition local news in 2008, early for a market of Charlottesville's size.

In 2019, Waterman sold WVIR-TV to Gray Television, which then sold the station's direct competition—WCAV and WVAW-LD—to make the purchase. WVIR-TV switched to the VHF band in 2020, causing technical issues. WVIR-CD operates in the Charlottesville area as a rebroadcaster on the UHF band to serve viewers who receive poor reception from the main signal.

== Television in Charlottesville: A quiet zone ==
It took Charlottesville until 1973 to have a television station of its own. One factor was the assignment of exclusively ultra high frequency (UHF) television channels to the area at a time when the viability of UHF was questioned. Early UHF stations were largely futile undertakings against VHF competition, as most televisions could not receive them yet and those that did produced a poor quality picture; the Daily Progress compared the difference between VHF and UHF reception to that between local AM radio and shortwave. Another factor was the location of part of Charlottesville and the surrounding area in the United States National Radio Quiet Zone. The Quiet Zone boundary runs through the grounds of the University of Virginia, dividing the area in half; all pending television allocations in the Quiet Zone had been abolished by 1965.

The Federal Communications Commission (FCC)'s 1952 Sixth Report and Order, its first nationwide channel allocation table, gave Charlottesville only one channel: UHF channel 45, reserved for non-commercial use. The nearest commercial allocation was on channel 42 in Waynesboro. In the ensuing public comment period, the city of Charlottesville and Charles Barham, the owner of WCHV radio, jointly petitioned to have very high frequency (VHF) channel 8 reassigned from Petersburg to a planned mountaintop tower near Crozet. They argued the VHF allocation would give a large part of central and northern Virginia its first-ever television service. This was denied by the FCC, which reasoned that removing VHF service from the larger city of Petersburg was unwarranted, though it conceded that a UHF station in Waynesboro would be unviewable in Charlottesville and added channel 64 to compensate. Barham settled for channel 64 and received a construction permit on January 29, 1953. One week later, CBS affiliate WLVA-TV signed on from Lynchburg on VHF channel 13, and Charlottesville residents reported good reception. WCHV radio saw no economic path forward and returned the channel 64 construction permit in January 1954.

In 1961, the Charlottesville Broadcasting Corporation, owner of radio station WINA, applied to have VHF channel 11 assigned to the Waynesboro–Staunton area. However, even as the FCC took applications for channel 11, the plan faced stiff opposition from the United States Navy, which planned to build a radio telescope at Sugar Grove, West Virginia. In the meantime, Virginia Broadcasting Corporation, a company owned by stockbroker and bluegrass music artist William Marburg—better known as Bill Clifton—filed for Charlottesville's channel 64 allocation. The channel 64 station received a construction permit in June 1964; six months later, the WINA proposal for channel 11 was denied after the Navy insisted on continued protection for the Sugar Grove site. The channel 64 permit was never built, though it was transferred to another group in 1966.

Two parties then filed for new UHF stations, both originally specifying channel 25, in January 1965. Shenandoah Valley Broadcasting proposed a semi-satellite of WSVA-TV in Harrisonburg with local news and public affairs programming, while WINA soon filed a competing proposal, believing Charlottesville needed a station of its own. WINA won the construction permit, amended to specify channel 29. However, it was unable to secure a network affiliation despite general manager Donald Heyne telling the networks that nearby affiliates only provided "fair, at best" reception to Charlottesville. In 1969, WINA radio was sold, but neither the buyer nor the seller wanted to retain the channel 29 construction permit, which was returned to the FCC.

== History ==
=== Early years ===
Another company known as the Virginia Broadcasting Corporation, a consortium of more than 30 local stockholders, filed with the FCC on October 19, 1971, for permission to build channel 29. The consortium was headed by Harold Wright and Robert Stroh, owners of WELK radio. The FCC granted the construction permit on March 1, 1972, and the company announced it would be operating within a year from a transmitter on Carters Mountain and studios on Main Street. In June, the station secured affiliation with NBC and announced plans for daily 6 and 11 p.m. newscasts; the company bought the equipment of a bankrupt TV station in Greensboro, North Carolina, which was dismantled, loaded into three rental trucks, and reassembled on Carters Mountain.

WVIR-TV began broadcasting on March 11, 1973. The station was three and a half hours late to its own sign-on due to a technical mishap. It took four years for channel 29 to turn a profit.

WVIR-TV was the first television station in Charlottesville and the only full-service outlet for more than 30 years; WHSV-TV opened a translator in Charlottesville in 1980, and Richmond public television station WCVE-TV built full-power repeater WHTJ in 1989. It also expanded its coverage area to include Staunton and the Harrisonburg–Rockingham County areas by way of two translators of its own.

The station originally operated from studios on Main Street, in a former shoe store, and later added more offices on East Market Street. In 1983, it bought a building on Market Street which was being used as a parking garage to renovate for its studios and offices.

=== Waterman ownership ===
In 1986, Waterman Broadcasting Corporation, led by Winchester native Bernie Waterman, presented an offer to the Virginia Broadcasting Corporation to buy WVIR-TV. The 41 stockholders unanimously agreed to sell the station for $8.694 million. The station continued to dominate its local market with no competition. In one 1998 ad, the station touted its news programs as the highest-rated in Virginia; the 6 p.m. news attracted 71 percent of the audience at that hour.

In 2003, WVIR was the object of a major libel case in Virginia stemming from a 2001 news report that incorrectly stated a man's property had been searched and cocaine had been seized. The station had refused to retract the incorrect report. Jurors returned a $10 million verdict against the station, but a judge reduced the amount, calling it "undue".

Channel 29 gained its first full-power commercial competition when WCAV (channel 19) launched as a CBS affiliate on August 13, 2004. The station was built by Gray Television, owner of WHSV-TV, and was followed by the conversion of the former WHSV translator into WVAW-LP, a separately programmed ABC affiliate for the Charlottesville area, as well as the 2005 launch of WAHU-CA "Fox 27".

WVIR-TV started a subchannel to air The CW when the network began in September 2006. This included a 10 p.m. local newscast. The station began producing high-definition newscasts in April 2008, making Charlottesville the second-smallest market at the time with HD local news. By this time, WVIR continued to hold a commanding lead over its competition.

WVIR-TV ceased regular programming on its analog signal at 12:30 p.m. on February 17, 2009, the original date for the digital television transition under federal mandate (which was later pushed back to June 12, 2009). The station's digital signal remained on its pre-transition UHF channel 32, using virtual channel 29; the decision to continue the February switchover saved the station $40,000. As part of the analog nightlight service, the station was required by the FCC to leave its analog signal on-air for two months after the end of digital transition at an estimated cost to the station of $20,000 to broadcast an endless loop of instructional video on digital converter box installation. This was interrupted daily to carry local newscasts.

The station entered the 2016–17 spectrum reallocation auction, electing to take $46,399,285 for its channel 32 allocation and move to the low-VHF band (channels 2 through 6). Chief engineer Bob Jenkins noted that the station was not particularly happy with moving to channel 2 but chose it over entering a channel-sharing agreement with another station.

=== Gray Television ownership ===
Waterman announced a deal to sell WVIR-TV to Gray Television on March 4, 2019. To acquire WVIR-TV, Gray concurrently announced it would sell WCAV and WVAW-LD, as well as WAHU-CD's programming, to Lockwood Broadcast Group. Gray, however, retained the WAHU-CD license. The sale was approved on April 15. The transaction was completed on October 1. On December 1, Gray split off the NBC and CW services for the Harrisonburg and Staunton area as a separate station run from WHSV-TV, WSVW-LD "NBC 3 in the Valley".

Gray implemented the station's repack. The station was to move its signal from channel 32 to channel 2 by January 17, 2020. Equipment shipping and construction delays forced WVIR-TV to use WCAV's channel 19 facility temporarily before it completed the relocation to channel 2 on March 18. As low-VHF signals are difficult to receive indoors in the digital era, WVIR-TV received hundreds of reception complaints in the following month and applied to increase its effective radiated power on channel 2 from 10 kW to 34 kW. Gray also converted the former WAHU-CD to simulcaster WVIR-CD, which covers the core of the metropolitan area with a UHF signal.

WVIR-TV also operates a digital replacement translator on UHF channel 30, licensed to Madison and broadcasting from a transmitter on Clark Mountain near Rapidan. This signal covers Culpeper, Madison, Louisa, Orange, and Spotsylvania counties, which are partially or fully shielded from WVIR-CD by terrain, and began operating in July 2023.

=== Notable alumni ===
- Brooke Baldwin – anchor
- Steve Berthiaume – sportscaster, 1987
- Lonnie Quinn – weather anchor/reporter

== Subchannels ==
The primary WVIR-TV transmitter is located on Carters Mountain south of Charlottesville. The station's signal is multiplexed:

Subchannels of WVIR-TV and WVIR-CD
| Subchannel | Res. | Short name | Programming |
|---|---|---|---|
| 29.1 | 1080i | NBC | NBC |
| 29.2 | 480i | Outlaw | Outlaw |
| 29.3 | 720p | CW | The CW Plus |
| 29.4 | 480i | Crime | True Crime Network |
| 29.5 | 480i | Grit | Grit |
| 29.6 | 480i | The365 | 365BLK |
