= WVAW-LD =

Television station in Charlottesville, Virginia

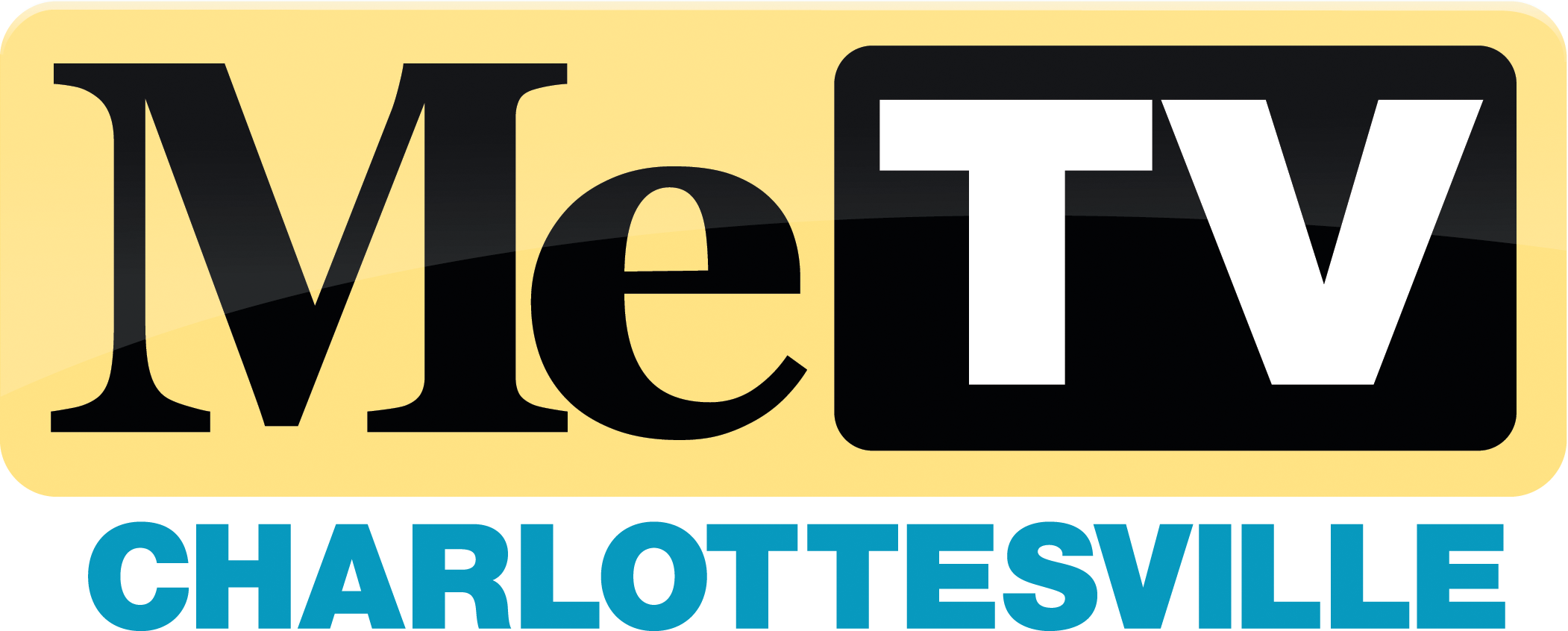
- Charlottesville, Virginia; United States
- Channels: Digital: 16 (UHF); Virtual: 16
- Branding: ABC Virginia; CBS 19 News; MeTV Charlottesville (27.2)

Programming
- Affiliations: 16.1: ABC; 19.2: CBS19 Weather Authority; 27.2: MeTV

Ownership
- Owner: Lockwood Broadcast Group; (Charlottesville TV, LLC)
- Sister stations: WCAV

History
- First air date: June 12, 1979 (as translator of WHSV-TV); April 9, 2004 (as separate station)
- Former call signs: W64AO (1979–2004); WVAW-LP (2004–2009)
- Former channel number: Analog: 64 (UHF, 1979–2004), 16 (UHF, 2004–2009)
- Call sign meaning: VA (Virginia postal abbreviation)

Technical information
- Licensing authority: FCC
- Facility ID: 4687
- Class: LD
- ERP: 15 kW
- HAAT: 320 m (1,050 ft)
- Transmitter coordinates: 37°59′3″N 78°28′52″W

Links
- Public license information: LMS
- Website: www.cbs19news.com

WVAW-LD (channel 16) is a low-power television station in Charlottesville, Virginia, United States, affiliated with ABC. It is owned by Lockwood Broadcast Group alongside dual CBS/Fox affiliate WCAV (channel 19). The two stations share studios on Rio East Court in Charlottesville; WVAW-LD's transmitter is located on Carters Mountain south of the city.

Due to WVAW-LD's low-power status, its broadcast radius only covers the immediate Charlottesville area. Therefore, it relies on cable and satellite to reach the entire market.

== History ==
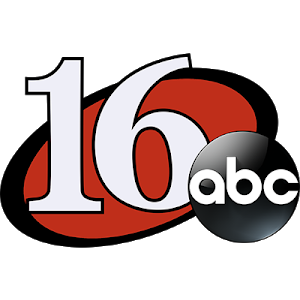
Former logo until 2021.

What is now WVAW-LD originally debuted on June 12, 1979, on analog UHF channel 64 with the call sign W64AO. The station was a low-powered translator of WHSV-TV in Harrisonburg, which was the area's default ABC affiliate. At the time, WHSV-TV was owned by Worrell Newspapers along with the Charlottesville Daily Progress.

On April 9, 2004, W64AO moved to UHF channel 16, changed call letters to WVAW-LP, upgraded power, and separated from WHSV-TV. WVAW-LP was the market's third local station after WVIR-TV (channel 29) and WCAV.

In early 2005, after the launch of WCAV and WVAW, Gray Television launched a third station in the area, Fox affiliate WAHU-CA. WVAW was temporarily taken off-the-air by a fire on its transmitter tower at the top of Carters Mountain on November 9, 2006. The signal was restored on November 13. On December 28, WVAW moved to Comcast channel 3.

The new set of stations replaced out-of-market stations from Richmond and Washington, D.C., as the primary network affiliates on local Comcast cable. Washington's WTTG and Richmond's WRIC-TV, WWBT and WTVR-TV remained available for some time in less prominent channel assignments on basic, then digital tiers before being gradually removed.

Gray announced the sale of WVAW-LD and WCAV to Lockwood Broadcast Group on March 4, 2019. The sale was concurrent with Gray's purchase of rival WVIR-TV from Waterman Broadcasting. The WAHU-CD license was not included in the sale, and would be retained by Gray as a translator to WVIR-TV, eventually moving to the WVIR-CD call; WAHU's programming with Fox, MeTV and AccuWeather affiliations were redistributed among WCAV and WVAW-LD subchannels. The transaction was completed on October 1.

== Newscasts ==
WVAW presently broadcasts 17 1/2 hours of locally produced newscasts each week (with 3 1/2 hours each weekday and 30 minutes each on Saturdays and Sundays).

WVAW and its sister stations employ the largest television news team dedicated exclusively to the Charlottesville market. While WVIR dedicates some staff to adjacent areas, WVAW focuses its coverage solely on the counties that comprise the Charlottesville television market. As the primary station in the CBS19 News operation, WCAV airs the most newscasts. WVAW simulcasts the 2 1/2 hours of Good Morning Charlottesville on weekday mornings from 4:30 to 7 a.m., as well as simulcasting CBS19 News at 6 and CBS19 News at 11.

== Technical information ==
=== Subchannels ===
The station's signal is multiplexed:

Subchannels of WVAW-LD
Channel	Res.	Short name	Programming
16.1	720p	ABC16	ABC
19.2	480i	19NOW	Local weather
27.2	480i	Me-TV	MeTV

=== Analog-to-digital conversion ===
WVAW shut down its analog signal, over UHF channel 16, on February 16, 2009, and "flash-cut" its digital signal into operation UHF channel 16. It also changed its calls to the current WVAW-LD with "LD" standing for low-power digital.
