= WVIR-CD =

Television station in Charlottesville, Virginia

Translator of WVIR-TV, Charlottesville, Virginia

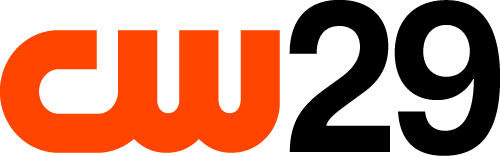

Charlottesville, Virginia; United States
- Channels: Digital: 35 (UHF); Virtual: 29
- Branding: WVIR 29; 29 News

Programming
- Affiliations: see WVIR-TV

Ownership
- Owner: Gray Media; (Gray Television Licensee, LLC)
- Sister stations: WVIR-TV

History
- First air date: August 31, 1998
- Former call signs: WADA-LP (1998–2005); WAHU-CA (2005–2009); WAHU-LD (2009–2011); WAHU-CD (2011–2019)
- Former channel numbers: Analog: 55 (UHF, 1998–2005), 27 (UHF, 2005–2009); Digital: 40 (UHF, 2009–2019)
- Former affiliations: Pax (1998–2005); Fox (2005–2019)
- Call sign meaning: Virginia

Technical information
- Licensing authority: FCC
- Facility ID: 47705
- Class: CD
- ERP: 15 kW
- HAAT: 314.1 m (1,031 ft)
- Transmitter coordinates: 37°59′4.2″N 78°28′51.1″W

Links
- Public license information: Public file; LMS
- Website: www.29news.com

WVIR-CD (channel 35) is a low-power, Class A television station in Charlottesville, Virginia, United States. It is a translator of dual NBC/CW+ affiliate WVIR-TV (channel 29) which is owned by Gray Media. WVIR-CD's transmitter is located on Carters Mountain south of Charlottesville; its parent station maintains studios on East Market Street (US 250 Business) in downtown.

== History ==
The station began its life as charter Pax TV affiliate WADA-LP on August 31, 1998. It first aired an analog signal on UHF channel 55 and later moved to UHF channel 27. In late-March 2005, owner Tiger Eye Broadcasting sold the station to Gray Television who proceeded to change the call letters to WAHU-CA. The station became a Fox affiliate and was integrated with CBS affiliate WCAV (channel 19) and ABC affiliate WVAW-LP (channel 16). Prior to WAHU's affiliation switch, Fox was available on cable from WTTG in Washington, D.C. That station was considered the default affiliate for the market and is still seen on cable due to "significantly viewed" status from the Federal Communications Commission (FCC). (Pax TV's successor, Ion Television, returned to the market on October 1, 2018, on WCAV's fourth subchannel.) Since 2006, the three stations have been the flagship of University of Virginia sports.

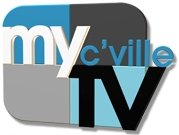
Logo used by WAHU-CD2 as a MyNetworkTV affiliate

On December 28, 2006, WAHU launched its digital signal on UHF channel 40. While providing an over-the-air standard definition Fox feed on its first digital subchannel, the station began airing a dedicated MyNetworkTV channel on a new second one. Following this addition, the station shifted several programs to the digital subchannel. Prior to the addition of WAHU-DT2, the network was added on September 5, 2006, as a secondary affiliation on the main channel. As part of the launch, Comcast moved WTTG from channel 9 to channel 18 in order to give WAHU the lower channel location.

On March 14, 2008, the station changed its call letters to WAHU-LD with "LD" meaning low-power digital. Also on the date, along with other television stations in Virginia, WAHU-LD2 aired the Virginia High School League championship basketball tournament for the first time. On February 18, 2009, it began broadcasting in high definition over-the-air. On March 13 and 14, WAHU-LD2 (and other stations in the state) aired the Virginia High School League basketball championships for a second time. On September 7, 2009, This TV started airing on WAHU-LD2. On January 3, 2011, the station changed its calls again to WAHU-CD with "CD" meaning Class A low-power digital.

In late 2018, WAHU-CD2 ended its affiliation with MyNetworkTV to take MeTV full-time.

Gray announced the sale of WCAV and WVAW-LD to Lockwood Broadcast Group on March 4, 2019. The sale was concurrent with Gray's purchase of rival WVIR-TV from Waterman Broadcasting. WAHU-CD was not included in the sale and would be retained by Gray as a sister station to WVIR-TV.

Gray took WAHU-CD silent on April 1 to begin moving its equipment out of the shared Newsplex facility. The Fox, MeTV, and AccuWeather affiliations were included in the sale to Lockwood and moved to WCAV and WVAW-LD.

As Gray's purchase of WVIR was held up by legal challenges, delaying construction of a new co-located transmitter, WAHU-CD returned to the air with Fox on August 23 with an interim facility from its previous location. Because the Fox feed on WCAV began using virtual channel 27 when WAHU-CD went silent, it began using virtual channel 35.

On October 8, 2019, the station changed its callsign to WVIR-CD when the legal challenges were cleared and the sale to Gray closed. Later that month, it converted to a translator of WVIR-TV. WVIR-CD preserved UHF reception in the core of the market when WVIR-TV moved to VHF channel 2, which is difficult to receive indoors, in 2020.

On September 15, 2022, Grit was added to the channel lineup.

== Technical information ==
=== Subchannels ===
This station rebroadcasts the subchannels of full-power WVIR-TV.

Subchannels of WVIR-TV and WVIR-CD
Channel	Res.	Aspect	Short name	Programming
29.1	1080i	16:9	NBC	NBC
29.2	480i	16:9	Outlaw	Outlaw
29.3	720p	16:9	CW	The CW Plus
29.4	480i	16:9	Crime	True Crime Network
29.5	480i	16:9	Grit	Grit
29.6	480i	16:9	The365	The365

=== Analog-to-digital conversion ===
WAHU shut down its analog signal, over UHF channel 27, on February 16, 2009. The station "flash-cut" its digital signal into operation UHF channel 40.
