= WCAV =

Television station in Charlottesville, Virginia

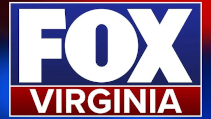
- Charlottesville, Virginia; United States
- Channels: Digital: 32 (UHF); Virtual: 19
- Branding: CBS 19; FOX Virginia (27.1)

Programming
- Affiliations: 19.1: CBS; 19.4: Ion; 27.1: Fox

Ownership
- Owner: Lockwood Broadcast Group; (Charlottesville TV, LLC)
- Sister stations: WVAW-LD

History
- First air date: August 13, 2004
- Former channel numbers: Analog: 19 (UHF, 2004–2009); Digital: 19 (UHF, 2009–2019)
- Call sign meaning: Cavalier, mascot of the University of Virginia

Technical information
- Licensing authority: FCC
- Facility ID: 363
- ERP: 205 kW
- HAAT: 329 m (1,079 ft)
- Transmitter coordinates: 37°59′4.2″N 78°28′51.1″W

Links
- Public license information: Public file; LMS
- Website: www.cbs19news.com

WCAV (channel 19) is a television station in Charlottesville, Virginia, United States, affiliated with CBS and Fox. It is owned by Lockwood Broadcast Group alongside low-power ABC affiliate WVAW-LD (channel 16). The two stations share studios on Rio East Court in Charlottesville; WCAV's transmitter is located on Carters Mountain south of the city.

== History ==
The history of WCAV began in October 1986, when the Federal Communications Commission (FCC) designated five applications for hearing, all proposing the construction of a new television station on channel 64, then allocated to Charlottesville. The proceeding to give the city its second full-service TV station, however, was dominated by a unique technical concern. The boundary of the United States National Radio Quiet Zone, established to protect the Green Bank Observatory (formerly National Radio Astronomy Observatory, NRAO) in Green Bank, West Virginia, cuts through Charlottesville. The two leading applicants had a major difference. Lindsay Television, owned by G. Walton Lindsay (whose grandfather founded The Daily Progress), proposed a transmitter site outside of the Quiet Zone, while Achernar Broadcasting (owned by attorney Margot Polivy) site was within the Quiet Zone. An FCC administrative law judge (ALJ) in 1988 handed down an initial decision in favor of Lindsay, whose proposal was superior even without the NRQZ issue. However, Achernar appealed, and the FCC Review Board remanded the case to the judge to consider whether Lindsay's facility would also interfere. While the FCC's Mass Media Bureau recommended a clause requiring the channel 64 station to go off in overnight hours after receiving notice from the NRAO, the ALJ found the restriction inadequate and rejected both applications. The new decision was appealed back to the Review Board, which awarded the permit to Lindsay, but the commission reversed the board and ruled the public interest was best served by granting neither application.

Achernar and Lindsay appealed the FCC's ruling to the United States Court of Appeals for the District of Columbia Circuit. In 1995, in Achernar Broadcasting Co. v. F.C.C., a three-judge panel found the FCC ruling "arbitrary and capricious", remanding both applications to the commission for reconsideration. They were still pending when a series of major changes took place in the Telecommunications Act of 1996, which brought an end to the use of the comparative hearing process for new applications, and the Balanced Budget Act of 1997 was passed. Two provisions in the latter put Achernar and Lindsay on the clock: one that authorized the FCC to encourage settlement proceedings in grandfathered comparative cases or force the parties into auction, and another that started the reallocation of channels 60 to 69 to non-television users. Both would affect the final product. Achernar and Lindsay merged their bids into Charlottesville Broadcasting Corporation, and after negotiations with the NRAO, an acceptable proposal was crafted and then modified to specify the use of channel 19. This channel was occupied by a translator of WVPT in Harrisonburg. In 2000, the FCC accepted the settlement and granted a construction permit to Charlottesville Broadcasting.

In 2004, Gray Television acquired the construction permit from Charlottesville Broadcasting for $1 million, having already secured a commitment from CBS for a 10-year affiliation. Gray had already been using channel 64 for W64AO, a low-power translator of WHSV-TV in Harrisonburg, which had gone on the air in 1980; it would move to channel 16 and became WVAW-LP, a separate ABC affiliate for Charlottesville.

WCAV began broadcasting on August 13, 2004, becoming the market's second full-power station, after NBC affiliate WVIR-TV (channel 29), and first CBS affiliate. In early 2005, the two stations were joined by new Class A Fox affiliate WAHU-CA (later digital WAHU-CD) on UHF channel 27.

Before WCAV's sign-on, Charlottesville had been one of the few markets in the Eastern Time Zone without a CBS affiliate. The area had previously received CBS programming on cable from Richmond's WTVR-TV and Washington, D.C.'s WUSA. When it launched, WCAV immediately replaced WUSA on local cable systems.

During 2007, the station first swapped analog cable channel allocations with WTVR. After that, the Richmond station moved to the digital tier.

Since 2006, the three have been the official flagships of University of Virginia sports.

On June 17, 2013, the WAHU Fox 27 simulcast on WCAV 19.3 was upgraded to high definition.

On October 1, 2018, Ion Television was added on 19.4.

Gray announced the sale of WCAV and WVAW-LD to Lockwood Broadcast Group on March 4, 2019. The sale is concurrent with Gray's purchase of rival WVIR-TV from Waterman Broadcasting. Although WAHU-CD's Fox and MeTV affiliations were included in the sale, the physical station was not and would be retained by Gray as a sister station to WVIR-TV. Fox moved full-time to WCAV on April 1, when Gray took WAHU-CD silent to move its facilities out of the shared Newsplex building. The transaction was completed on October 1.

In November 2021, Fox 27 started simulcasting on digital over-the-air channel 31.1 as WAHU-LD Crozet, which was acquired from Lowcountry 34 Media.

== News operation ==
WCAV presently broadcasts 47 hours of locally produced newscasts each week (with nine hours each weekday and one hour each on Saturdays and Sundays).

WCAV and its sister stations employ the largest television news team dedicated exclusively to the Charlottesville market. While WVIR dedicates some staff to adjacent areas, WCAV focuses its coverage solely on the counties that comprise the Charlottesville television market. In June 2006, WCAV received the runner-up award for "Outstanding News Operation" by the Virginia Association of Broadcasters. WWBT in Richmond was the winner in that category. In 2007, the station received the "Outstanding Sports Coverage" award for a commercial television station from the Virginia Association of Broadcasters.

That same year, its website was the runner up to WVEC in Norfolk for an outstanding website award. Beth Duffy, formerly of WVIR, returned to the airwaves on WCAV on April 16, 2007. She left the station on November 25, 2009. On September 21, 2007, WCAV launched The Local AccuWeather Channel on a new second digital subchannel and live streaming video on its website and mobile phone app. Known on-air as "CBS19 Weather Now", it was added to Comcast digital channel 209 in December. In the fall of 2015, the channel was given a new look and the "CBS19 Weather Now" branding was changed to "NEWSPLEX NOW". The updated channel featured a daily simulcast of all Newsplex newscasts, previously recorded broadcasts and weather information provided by AccuWeather.

As the primary station in the "Charlottesville Newsplex" operation, WCAV airs the most newscasts, with the first hour of Good Morning Charlottesville and a noon newscast exclusive to the station. WVAW simulcasts the second hour of Good Morning Charlottesville on weekday mornings (6–7 a.m.), CBS19 News weeknights at 5, 5:30 and 6 p.m., and 19News Nightcast weeknights at 11 p.m. WAHU airs an hour-long extension of Good Morning Charlottesville weekdays at 7 a.m. and nightly prime time newscasts at 10 p.m. that competes with CW affiliate WVIR-DT3.

== Technical information ==
=== Subchannels ===
The station's signal is multiplexed:

Subchannels of WCAV
Channel	Res.	Short name	Programming
19.1	1080i	CBS19	CBS
19.4	480i	IONTV	Ion
27.1	720p	FOXVA	Fox

=== Analog-to-digital conversion ===
WCAV shut down its analog signal, over UHF channel 19, on February 16, 2009, the day to the prior to the original date on which full-power television stations in the United States were set to transition from analog to digital broadcasts under federal mandate (which was later rescheduled for June 12, 2009). The station "flash-cut" its digital signal into operation on UHF channel 19, as it had been given a construction permit too late to receive a companion digital channel.
