= Osbournes Reloaded =

2009 American variety show pilot

- Starring: Ozzy Osbourne; Sharon Osbourne; Jack Osbourne; Kelly Osbourne
- Country of origin: United States
- Original language: English
- No. of seasons: 1
- No. of episodes: 6 (5 unaired)

Production
- Running time: 35 minutes
- Production companies: Joks Productions; FremantleMedia North America

Original release
- Network: Fox
- Release: March 31, 2009

Osbournes Reloaded is a 2009 variety show that aired its only episode on Fox. The show was hosted by The Osbournes — Ozzy, Sharon, Jack and Kelly — and premiered Tuesday March 31 on Fox following American Idol. FremantleMedia, the producers of American Idol, produced the show. The show was also taped in the same studio as American Idol at CBS Television City in Hollywood.

The show consisted of sketches, stunts, celebrity cameos, live action audience participation and live musical acts such as Fall Out Boy, and would have included taped parody skits often featuring Ozzy in drag playing such characters as Audrina from The Hills and Juno. Other bits include the Osbournes working "real jobs" (Ozzy and Kelly working drive-thru fast food for example), a recurring Littlest Osbournes segment (British kids swearing like Ozzy and Sharon), and the Osbournes meeting other families from across the country that share their name.

Although planned as an hour-long show, the premiere episode was cut down to 35 minutes and American Idol was extended to an hour and 25 minutes. The show was universally panned by critics, with Roger Catlin of the Hartford Courant even going so far as to call it the "worst variety show ever" and Tom Shales of The Washington Post labeling it "Must-Flee TV".

== Backstory ==
In July 2008, Fox announced that the Osbourne family would be hosting a new variety show tentatively titled Osbournes: Reloaded (working title was 'Osbournes: Loud and Dangerous'). The show started taping at Television City in December 2008 before a live audience.

The Osbourne family appeared together to host Fox's Sunday night Animation Domination block on March 29, 2009.

== Preemption ==
At least 26 Fox affiliates opted to preempt the program, 10 of them delaying it until a later time and at least 16 not showing it at all, due to concerns over the nature of the program, most of them part of the station groups Local TV LLC and Raycom Media. All Raycom owned/operated affiliates (WBRC, WDFX-TV, WFLX, WTNZ, WPGX, WXIX-TV, WFXG, WXTX, and WSFX-TV (the latter two are owned by Southeastern Media Holdings and operated by Raycom)) preempted the program outright.

In the case of many of the Local TV-owned stations, this was the first preemption of a Fox program due to content in their histories after the July 2008 sale of seven Fox O&O stations to Local TV. These stations had previously shown promotions and commercials for the show, as the preemption decision came after the network offered the stations a six-minute preview reel of the episode's content.

In Milwaukee, WITI, a former Fox owned-and-operated station owned by Local TV, decided to air the show at 1:05 a.m. due to the content of the show in order to show a round table program about drug abuse, "Dealing with Drugs". The station manager stated that, as many young people watch its lead in American Idol (especially with, as anchor Brad Hicks said as the special started, the presence of local contestant Danny Gokey in the show), the Osbournes show would be more appropriate for late-night, and that a show on the drug problem (an issue that was heavily covered in the preceding few weeks due to a rash of young adult deaths from drugs in the area) would be more appropriate to follow Idol. Sister station WDAF-TV in Kansas City also moved the show to 1:05 am and aired the station's 60th anniversary special instead. However the promotions during Fox network time listing the "up next" starting time on both stations were not changed to disclaim the new time.

WGHP, the High Point, North Carolina affiliate serving the Piedmont Triad market, opted to delay the program until midnight, filling the original time slot with consumer reports from the news department. Station manager Karen Adams told the Greensboro News & Record that 60% of the email feedback she received was critical of the decision, although many of those viewers had missed the station's announcement of the rescheduling.

Stations not owned by Raycom or Local TV, such WRAZ (owned by Capitol Broadcasting Company), and WACH (owned by Barrington Broadcasting at the time) moved the show to a later time.

The network, however, did manage to convince Sinclair Broadcasting Group, one of the network's largest affiliate groups and known as a conservative-leaning broadcaster, to air the show as scheduled.

== Cancellation ==
The March 31 episode was billed as a special preview, with regular episodes to begin airing in the summer of 2009. However, Fox was forced to cancel Osbournes: Reloaded in August 2009 after 14 percent of Fox affiliates threatened to pre-empt the show. This would have resulted in too many pre-emptions for the show to gain enough viewership to be viable. Five episodes remain unaired.
