= WKNX-TV =

Television station in Knoxville, Tennessee

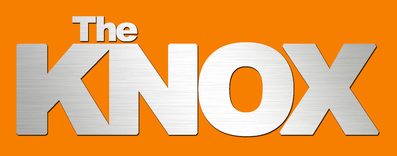
- Knoxville, Tennessee; United States
- Channels: Digital: 7 (VHF); Virtual: 7
- Branding: The Knox

Programming
- Affiliations: 7.1: Independent; 7.2: Great; 7.3: Ion Plus

Ownership
- Owner: Lockwood Broadcast Group; (Tennessee TV, LLC)
- Sister stations: WTNZ

History
- First air date: July 31, 2004
- Former call signs: WMAK (2004–2013)
- Former channel numbers: Translators: WEZK-LP 28 Knoxville (city); WJZC-LP 22 Sevierville
- Former affiliations: Independent (2004–2009); RTV (2009–2012); Daystar (2012–2013, DT2 2013–2021)
- Call sign meaning: Knoxville

Technical information
- Licensing authority: FCC
- Facility ID: 83931
- ERP: 55 kW
- HAAT: 382 m (1,253 ft)
- Transmitter coordinates: 36°0′36″N 83°55′57″W

Links
- Public license information: Public file; LMS
- Website: www.theknoxtv.com

WKNX-TV (channel 7) is an independent television station in Knoxville, Tennessee, United States. It is owned by Lockwood Broadcast Group alongside Fox affiliate WTNZ (channel 43). The two stations share studios on Executive Park Drive (along I-75/I-40) in Knoxville's Green Valley section; WKNX-TV's transmitter is located on Sharp's Ridge, near the city's Oakwood section (just north of downtown Knoxville).

== History ==
WKNX signed on the air on July 31, 2004, as WMAK. It was one of the first stations in the United States to sign on exclusively as a digital station, with no full-powered analog counterpart. The station was originally owned by South Central Communications, which also owns or operates five radio stations in the Knoxville area, and formerly owned CBS affiliate WVLT-TV (channel 8) from 1954 to 1989. As an independent station, WMAK ran syndicated programs as well as recent and classic motion pictures. On September 8, 2008, the station added programming from the Retro Television Network (RTV) on its second digital subchannel. This, however, would soon compromise the network's entire schedule on its main channel.

On April 27, 2009, Dallas-based religious broadcaster Daystar Television Network bought WMAK for $2 million; the deal was completed on July 14 of that year. WMAK would retain its RTV affiliation on its main channel until mid-2012, when it switched it over to Daystar, moving RTV programming to DT2.

On November 13, 2012, Lockwood Broadcast Group entered into an agreement to purchase WMAK from Daystar for $2.95 million. Simultaneously with the purchase, Lockwood filed an application with the Federal Communications Commission (FCC) to change the station's call letters to WKNX-TV. The FCC approved the sale on December 21.

On February 25, 2013, Lockwood took control of the station, which reverted to a general entertainment programming format (Daystar replaced RTV's programming on the station's second digital subchannel; at some point 7.2 was deleted); its branding was also changed to "WKNX, The Knox", although the station did not formally change its callsign until March 19 (the WKNX callsign was formerly used on Saginaw, Michigan's WEYI-TV from 1953 to 1972). Formal consummation of the Lockwood purchase occurred on March 4, 2013, creating the Knoxville television market's first station duopoly with CW affiliate WBXX-TV.

On October 1, 2015, Gray Television, owners of WVLT-TV, announced that it would acquire WBXX-TV from Lockwood, separating the station from WKNX-TV. The purchase was made as part of Gray's acquisition of the broadcasting assets of Schurz Communications; as part of the deal, Lockwood received KAKE in Wichita, Kansas (which Gray put up for sale following the deal with Schurz), and paid $11.2 million to Gray. Gray (through WVLT-TV, Inc.) took the operations of the station via a local marketing agreement. The sale was completed on February 1, 2016.

On August 20, 2018, it was announced that Lockwood Broadcast Group would purchase WTNZ from Gray Television, as part of a series of divestures from the $3.5 billion merger of Gray Television and Raycom Media, as part of a group deal that also see Lockwood to buy WFXG in Augusta, Georgia, WPGX in Panama City, Florida, and WDFX-TV in Dothan, Alabama, and made WKNX another duopoly, this time with a Fox affiliate. The sale was completed on January 2, 2019.

== Technical information ==
=== Subchannels ===
The station's signal is multiplexed:

Subchannels of WKNX-TV
Subchannel	Res.	Short name	Programming
7.1	1080i	WKNX-HD	Independent
7.2	480i	WKNX-GR	Great
7.3	480i	WKNX-IP	Ion Plus

=== Former translators ===
WKNX (as WMAK) previously operated through two low-power analog translators: WEZK-LP (channel 28) in Knoxville, and WJZC-LP (channel 22) in Sevierville. These stations were sold in 2009 to Living Faith Ministries; WEZK-LD now relays Grundy, Virginia–based WLFG (channel 68).
