= WBXX-TV =

Television station in Crossville, Tennessee

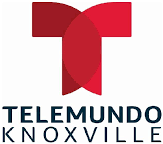
- Crossville–Knoxville, Tennessee; United States
- City: Crossville, Tennessee
- Channels: Digital: 31 (UHF); Virtual: 20
- Branding: The CW Knoxville (general); Telemundo Knoxville (20.5); WVLT News on The CW Knoxville (newscasts)

Programming
- Affiliations: 20.1: The CW; 20.5: Telemundo; for others, see § Subchannels

Ownership
- Owner: Gray Media; (Gray Television Licensee, LLC)
- Sister stations: WVLT-TV

History
- First air date: October 3, 1976
- Former call signs: WCPT-TV (1976–1982); WINT-TV (1982–1997)
- Former channel numbers: Analog: 55 (UHF, 1976–1982); 20 (UHF, 1982–2009); Digital: 50 (UHF, 2003–2009); 20 (UHF, 2009–2019)
- Former affiliations: Independent (1976–1997); The WB (1997–2006); UPN (secondary, 2001–2002)
- Call sign meaning: The WB (former affiliation) and XX (Roman numeral 20)

Technical information
- Licensing authority: FCC
- Facility ID: 72971
- ERP: 834 kW
- HAAT: 727.5 m (2,387 ft)
- Transmitter coordinates: 36°6′33″N 84°20′17″W

Links
- Public license information: Public file; LMS
- Website: www.wvlt.tv/page/the-cw-knoxville/

WBXX-TV (channel 20) is a television station licensed to Crossville, Tennessee, United States, serving the Knoxville area as an affiliate of The CW and Telemundo. It is owned by Gray Media alongside dual CBS/MyNetworkTV affiliate WVLT-TV (channel 8). The two stations share studios on Papermill Drive (near I-40/I-75) on the west side of Knoxville; WBXX-TV's transmitter is located at Windrock, Buffalo Mountain outside Oliver Springs, Tennessee.

WBXX-TV is the only full-power Knoxville-market station to be licensed in a city in the Central Time Zone; Cumberland County (where Crossville is located) and Fentress County are the only two counties in the market that observe Central Time, while Knoxville proper is in Eastern Time. However, while CW network programming is promoted with both Eastern and Central Time listings, WBXX-TV's local programming is promoted with only Eastern Time listings.

== History ==
=== WCPT-TV and WINT-TV ===
WBXX began operation as independent WCPT-TV ("Wonderful Cumberland Plateau Television") on analog channel 55 (716–722 MHz) beginning October 3, 1976, from a tower site on Haley Mountain (Renegade Resort) in Cumberland County, Tennessee. It was owned by Edward M. "Mack" Johnson, who also owned 49% of WSCV AM in Crossville. The studios in Crossville were a former loan office. WCPT-TV produced a nightly local newscast, as well as a three-hour live Saturday Night Jamboree; much of its syndicated fare came by bus the day after airing on Nashville's WZTV. Viewers in Cookeville could view the station by translator on channel 23; it also maintained a facility there. The station did look at obtaining an ABC affiliation, but the station needed to serve 1,500 more households to make the arrangement worthwhile. It also tried to move to channel 7 in 1977, which the station opted not to pursue further after meeting with opposition from WTVK. Initially, WCPT-TV ran a mix of religious shows, some low-budget syndicated movies and westerns, and some cartoons, as well as sporting shows and public affairs programs. By the early 1980s, more movies and drama shows aired as well as cartoons.

Channel 55 was sold to Calvin C. Smith, who owned stations in Kentucky, and John A. Cunningham in 1979. In February 1980, citing poor reception and failing equipment, they asked to switch from channel 55 to channel 20, which was reserved as educational, and make 55 the non-commercial allocation for Crossville; this was approved and WCPT-TV was ordered to move to channel 20 effective August 13. Additionally, Smith and Cunningham were approved to increase channel 20's effective radiated power to 2,818 kW (it had signed on with just 16) in 1981, but those facilities were never implemented.

Still operating at low power, the station became WINT-TV on December 27, 1982, and in 1983, the station was sold mostly to Larry Hudson, with Cunningham retaining 10 percent. In 1988, WINT-TV aired religious programming.

In 1995, CW TV, headed by Cynthia Willis, acquired the station for $700,000 by way of Crossville TV, LP. CW applied to move the transmitter site to Upper Windrock, an outcropping on Buffalo Mountain along the Cumberland Plateau above Oliver Springs, Tennessee, and boost power to 3,630 kW—covering Knoxville.

=== Becoming WBXX ===
In 1997, the partners in Crossville TV LP sold the license to ACME Communications. ACME immediately changed the call letters to WBXX-TV, and in October 1997, channel 20 relaunched from its new facilities as Knoxville's affiliate of The WB. It was the second station for ACME, behind KWBP in Portland, Oregon, which it had acquired that June. The station also ran select UPN programming during 2001 and 2002, as that network did not have a full-power Knoxville affiliate at the time; Knoxville's primary UPN affiliate, WEEE-LP (channel 32), had signal coverage that was limited to the Knoxville area proper, and was not carried on cable until the Summer of 2002.

"CW 20" logo, used from August 2008 through April 2018

WBXX was consistently one of the highest-rated WB stations in the country, and was recognized as such by The WB network. After being known as "WB20" since signing on, WBXX rebranded as "East Tennessee's WB" in September 2003. When the station took the affiliation with The CW, it was renamed "East Tennessee's CW". WBXX rebranded again, to "CW20", in August 2008.

=== A decade of sales ===
In February 2011, ACME Communications announced a deal to sell the station to Virginia-based Lockwood Broadcast Group. The sale was approved by the Federal Communications Commission (FCC) on March 21 with the consummation being completed on May 6. From 1998 until 2004, the station aired a series of interstitials during children's programming called WB 20 Kids Club (later Dubba Clubba) hosted by comedian Jackson Bailey (known as "Joe Cool"). The interstitials featured information and contests to viewers in several vignettes each weekday covering topics such as science, biology, conservation, music, and pet care.

From 2015 to 2019, WBXX has broadcast Atlantic Coast Conference football and men's basketball games syndicated from the Raycom Sports–operated ACC Network, some of which were shared with the main channel of CBS affiliate WVLT-TV. Those games were previously broadcast on MyNetworkTV affiliate WVLT-DT2 from 2009 until the end of the 2014–2015 season.

On October 1, 2015, Gray Television announced that it would acquire WBXX-TV from Lockwood. The purchase was made as part of Gray's acquisition of the broadcasting assets of Schurz Communications; as part of the deal, Lockwood received KAKE in Wichita, Kansas (which Gray put up for sale following the deal with Schurz), and paid $11.2 million to Gray. Gray (through WVLT-TV, Inc.) took the operations of the station via Local Marketing Agreement. The sale was completed on February 1, 2016.

"The CW Knoxville" logo, used from April 2018 until 2024

On June 25, 2018, Gray Television announced that they would acquire the assets of Raycom Media, who had been owned Fox affiliate WTNZ-TV since 1996 for $3.6 billion. Due to FCC rules, Gray kept the existing duopoly of WVLT-TV and WBXX-TV and sell WTNZ, since WTNZ and WVLT-TV rank among the four highest-rated stations in the Knoxville market in total-day viewership. On August 20, 2018, it was announced that Gray would sell WTNZ to former owner Lockwood Broadcast Group, who owned WKNX-TV since 2013 in a group deal that see Lockwood to acquire WFXG-TV in Augusta, WPGX-TV in Panama City and WDFX-TV in Dothan. The sale was completed on January 2, 2019.

== Newscasts ==
Until mid-late 2013, WBXX aired the nationally syndicated morning show The Daily Buzz from 6 until 8. The program was produced by ACME Communications, and during the company's ownership of this station, there were local weather cut-ins focusing on the Knoxville area. It is unknown if these updates were still provided with WBXX's ownership change to Lockwood. The Daily Buzz then moved to sister station WKNX-TV, which aired it until its sudden cancellation on April 17, 2015.

At one point in time, NBC affiliate WBIR-TV (then owned by Gannett, now owned by Tegna) began producing a nightly newscast on this station through an outsourcing agreement, called 10 News at 10. The newscast only aired for twelve minutes in an abbreviated format featuring the day's top stories along with an updated weather forecast. The broadcast originated from WBIR's facility on Hutchinson Avenue in Knoxville's Lincoln Park section (official address is Bill Williams Avenue). It was offered as an alternative to Fox affiliate WTNZ which had nightly local news produced by ABC affiliate WATE-TV. In early March 2011, WTNZ terminated its news share agreement with WATE after entering into another contract with WBIR. As a result, the latter station stopped producing the nightly update for WBXX.

On August 1, 2011, WATE (then owned by Young Broadcasting, now owned by Nexstar Media Group) returned to the prime time newscast race with a new nightly 35-minute broadcast on WBXX (The CW 20 News at 10) through another outsourcing agreement. Corresponding with the addition, WATE upgraded to high definition newscasts that October 17 becoming the third local news operation in Knoxville to make the change. Initially, the newscast on WBXX was not included in the upgrade as it lacked a high definition-capable master control at its separate studios to receive the newscast in HD. This lasted until early April 2012 when WBXX underwent a master control upgrade. The CW 20 News at 10 originated from WATE's studios in Camp House on North Broadway in the city's Old North Knoxville section. Starting on January 1, 2017, sister station WVLT-TV took over production of WBXX's newscasts from WATE which include the morning (7–9 a.m.) and prime time 10 p.m. newscasts.

== Technical information ==
=== Subchannels ===
The station's signal is multiplexed:

Subchannels of WBXX-TV
Subchannel	Res.	Short name	Programming
20.1	1080i	WBXX-DT	The CW
20.2	480i	StoryTV	Story Television
20.3	480i	H & I	Heroes & Icons
20.4	480i	DABL	Dabl
20.5	1080i	Tmundo	Telemundo
20.6	480i	Defy	Defy

=== Analog-to-digital conversion ===
WBXX-TV shut down its analog signal, over UHF channel 20, on June 12, 2009, the official date on which full-power television stations in the United States transitioned from analog to digital broadcasts under federal mandate. The station's digital signal relocated from its pre-transition UHF channel 50 to channel 20.
