= WATE-TV =

Television station in Knoxville, Tennessee

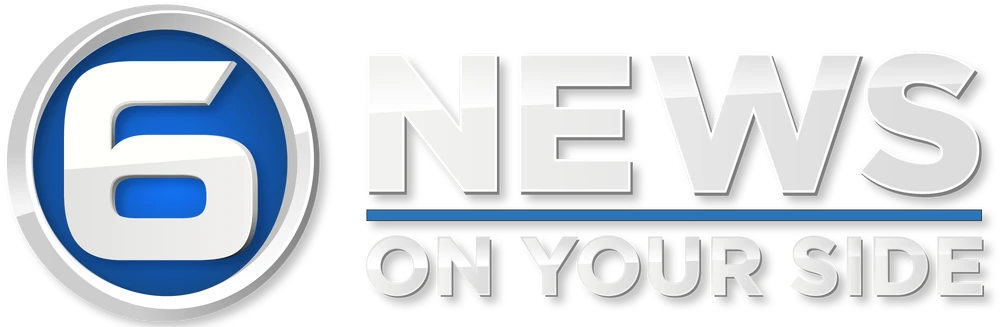
- Knoxville, Tennessee; United States
- Channels: Digital: 26 (UHF); Virtual: 6
- Branding: 6 News On Your Side

Programming
- Affiliations: 6.1: ABC; for others, see § Subchannels

Ownership
- Owner: Nexstar Media Group; (Nexstar Media Inc.)
- Sister stations: Tegna: WBIR-TV

History
- First air date: October 1, 1953
- Former call signs: WROL-TV (1953–1954); WTVS (1954); WATE (1954–1956)
- Former channel numbers: Analog: 6 (VHF, 1953–2009)
- Former affiliations: NBC (1953–1979); ABC (secondary, 1953–1956)

Technical information
- Licensing authority: FCC
- Facility ID: 71082
- ERP: 930 kW
- HAAT: 529.2 m (1,736 ft)
- Transmitter coordinates: 36°0′12.8″N 83°56′34″W

Links
- Public license information: Public file; LMS
- Website: www.wate.com

WATE-TV (channel 6) is a television station in Knoxville, Tennessee, United States, affiliated with ABC. It is owned by Nexstar Media Group, whose Tegna subsidiary owns NBC affiliate WBIR-TV (channel 10). WATE-TV's studios are located in the Greystone mansion on North Broadway/SR 33/SR 71/US 441, and its transmitter is located on Sharp's Ridge in North Knoxville.

== History ==
Channel 6 was East Tennessee's first television station, signing on the air at 8 p.m. on October 1, 1953, as WROL-TV. The race to be the first television station in the eastern part of the state was won by WROL-TV when the 300-foot (91 m) tower of WJHL-TV in Johnson City (ironically, now a sister station to the Knoxville station) collapsed a few months earlier. That station would have been first to sign on, but WROL claimed the title by 26 days. Its first studios were underneath the 800-foot (244 m) self-supporting tower on Sharp's Ridge which was one of the tallest man-made structures in Tennessee at the time. It was signed on by Greater East Tennessee TV, Inc., owned by local insurance executive Paul Mountcastle and a small group of investors along with WROL AM 950. At the time, Mountcastle was chairman of the board of the Life and Casualty Insurance Company of Tennessee in Nashville, which signed on WLAC-TV (now WTVF) in that city in 1954. Despite that connection, the stations were not considered to be co-owned.

WROL-TV signed on as a primary NBC affiliate because of WROL-AM's longtime affiliation with NBC Radio and also shared ABC programming with CBS affiliate WTSK-TV (later WTVK, now WVLT-TV), whose Channel 26 analog signal did not travel nearly as far. Although NBC held a firm grip on WROL, DuMont tried unsuccessfully several times to get a secondary affiliation with the station when it was not broadcasting NBC and ABC. Channel 6 opted to fill its non-network schedule with local programming, a Federal Communications Commission (FCC) mandate, and as a result, DuMont was forced to join WTVK on a secondary basis. CBS also made many attempts to grab a primary affiliation with Knoxville's only VHF station, but the owners of WROL held firm despite many financial incentives from the other networks, especially CBS.

The station changed its call letters to WATE-TV in 1955 with the new call letters not really standing for anything; the licensee also was renamed to WATE, Inc. John Reese, the station's program director at the time stated "those call letters were the next available at the FCC." In 1956, WATE dropped ABC when WBIR-TV signed on and took the CBS affiliation from WTVK, leaving WTVK the ABC station by default. At that time, Knoxville became one of the smallest TV markets in the country to have affiliates of all three networks. WROL later changed its call letters to WATE to correspond with the television station. WATE-TV had a role in the failure of WBIR to have its second antenna tower on House Mountain in 1965 for better coverage. The station used a rather ingenious way to force its chief rival station to build a 1,751-foot (534 m) tower on Zachary Ridge instead of on the much higher House Mountain. WATE simply leased all of the property on the top of House Mountain from the lot owners. With no property for a proposed tower base on the Mountain, WBIR had no choice but to spend millions of dollars more to build a taller tower on much-shorter Zachery Ridge nearby, two years later.

As was broadcast tradition with many stations in the 1950s, the channel's sales offices moved to downtown Knoxville and the studios were moved to a new building on North Broadway. In 1965, Mountcastle and his group sold WATE-TV to Nationwide Communications of Columbus, Ohio. That same year, the station moved into and renovated the historic 19th century Greystone Mansion, now on the National Register of Historic Places. At the same time, WATE (which had changed frequency to 620 kilohertz) was sold off changing its call letters to WETE. It is now WRJZ, at AM 620. The self-supporting tower on Sharp's Ridge was dismantled in 1975 when the station built a 1,153-foot (351 m) broadcasting tower alongside it. That tower was dismantled in July 2016, owing to a newer, 1,525-foot (465 m) multi-plexed tower built beside it. The taller tower is owned by American Tower, Inc., formerly Spectracite Broadcast Towers, Inc.

On September 17, 1979, WATE swapped its NBC affiliation with WTVK to become an ABC affiliate. The years 1979 to 1980 saw the ABC television network become the highest-rated in the country and ABC wanted a stronger station in Knoxville. At the time, WATE-TV joined other former NBC affiliates WSB-TV in Atlanta, KSTP-TV in Minneapolis–Saint Paul, WRTV in Indianapolis and WSOC-TV in Charlotte who also switched to ABC. At the time, WATE was the market leader with a strong VHF signal in East Tennessee, Southwestern Virginia, and Southeastern Kentucky. WTVK's UHF signal on channel 26 was marginal at best in much of the Knoxville area and many viewers in East Tennessee and Southeastern Kentucky treated ABC as though it were a new television network (which it was anything but at the time). Some of them would not see NBC again until September 10, 1988, when WBIR-TV joined that network that day. After that, CBS was no longer seen in many of these households until December 8, 1988, when CBS moved its affiliation to WTVK (which coincided with its call letter change to WKXT-TV and switch to VHF channel 8 on that day; it is now WVLT-TV). Coincidentally, seventeen years later, WATE's digital signal would be broadcast on digital channel 26.

During its first fifty years, WATE pioneered many locally produced programs like The Homemaker Show hosted by Mary Starr. Housewives were glued to television sets as Mary showed them the latest recipes and homemaking tips. Star Time, hosted by local businessman Jim Clayton, featured many local country music acts and The Cas Walker Show, a local country music show hosted by former Knoxville Mayor Cas Walker who also owned a chain of grocery stores in East Tennessee, Southwest Virginia, and Southeast Kentucky. The show also featured Dolly Parton who made her television debut on WATE-TV before she became famous. In 1981, the station premiered PM Magazine with MayCay Beeler and Calvin Sneed. The popular syndicated show highlighted unusual people, places, and things from the East Tennessee/Southeastern Kentucky area.

In 1993, Nationwide sold its three ABC-affiliated television stations (WATE, WBAY-TV in Green Bay, Wisconsin, and WRIC-TV in Richmond, Virginia) to Young Broadcasting. Young Broadcasting emerged from Chapter 11 bankruptcy protection in June 2010, and the new company was renamed New Young Broadcasting, Inc. As a contingency of the reorganization plan, Young signed a limited management agreement with Atlanta-based Gray Television to allow that company to operate all of Young's stations except WATE, WLNS-TV in Lansing, Michigan, and KRON-TV in San Francisco. Gray was not allowed to operate WATE or WLNS because it also owned WVLT in the Knoxville market and WILX-TV in Lansing. Young Broadcasting merged with Media General on November 12, 2013, which united East Tennessee's first and second TV stations (WATE and WJHL, Johnson City) as sister stations. In 2017, Media General merged with Nexstar Broadcasting.

WATE-TV adopted its current "Circle 6" logo in 2011. Due to the design and similar callsigns, the logo has received comparisons to fellow ABC affiliate WTAE-TV in Pittsburgh, who has used the current version of its "Circle 4" logo since 1995 and has used a variation of it since 1973. Aside from the ABC affiliation, the two stations are not related.

== Programming ==
WATE-TV owes its early existence to locally produced music programs owing to East Tennessee's country music history. 1950s programs like Bonnie Lou and Buster, The Cas Walker Show, and Jim Hill's Star Time were later joined by Nashville-produced country music programs like The Porter Wagoner Show, The Wilburn Brothers Show and the Flatt and Scruggs show featuring guitarist Lester Flatt and banjoist Earl Scruggs. All of these were popular programs on Channel 6 in the mid 1960s and 70s.

In the early 1980s, WATE-TV also produced the East Tennessee version of PM Magazine, the syndicated series from Westinghouse-Group W that spotlighted local people and events in the area. The show, co-hosted by MayCay Beeler and Calvin Sneed, who had moved over from the news department, ran for three seasons.

During the month of August, WATE broadcasts Tennessee Titans preseason football games regionally syndicated by sister station and fellow ABC affiliate WKRN-TV in Nashville.

In February 2024, WATE reached an agreement to broadcast matches from USL League One club One Knoxville SC. At least two games will air on WATE, with the remaining games airing on WATE-DT2 (Antenna TV). WATE will also begin airing a weekly Soccer Talk show online.

=== News operation ===
WATE-TV broadcasts 42 1/2 hours of locally produced newscasts each week (with 6 1/2 hours each weekday and five hours each on Saturdays and Sundays).

Although WATE may not have always been a ratings powerhouse in east Tennessee, it has been the leader in other areas. In the late-1960s, it assembled the popular on-air team of news anchor Pete Gardener, weathercaster Margie Ison, and Sports Director Mike Thurman. This move resulted in the station making inroads into the ratings-dominant WBIR which led the market ratings at the time. In the early-1970s, Sam Brown joined WATE as news anchor and the group of "Sam, Mike, and Margie" subsequently became the most well known on-air personality team in Knoxville.

By the mid-1970s after the previous changes had been in place for a while, all of the station's newscasts were ranked number one in their respective time periods. Also at this point, it was the first outlet to update its newsroom technology with a switch from film to videotape (i.e. electronic journalism) as well as own-and-operating a live microwave truck to assist in newsgathering purposes.

The station was Knoxville's first to utilize a helicopter (known as "Sky Eye 6") for on-air coverage. In 1977, WATE debuted the market's first local newscasts seen on Saturday evenings featuring anchor Art Powell, Kay Elliott providing weather forecasts, and Calvin Sneed with sports. This was followed in 1978 by the launch of Knoxville's first noon newscast with Sneed adding the show to his anchoring duties. In 1979, he would be promoted to weekend news anchor in order to welcome the area's first local newscasts seen on Sunday nights. In 1980, WATE promoted Sneed to become the first African-American to co-anchor weeknight main news broadcasts in East Tennessee, which included Chattanooga, Knoxville and Tri-Cities.

During the early 1980s, the unofficial goal of the weeknight news crew was to regularly scoop the Knoxville Journal (a morning newspaper) which was in the process of gaining circulation over the Knoxville News Sentinel (published in the afternoons). The stories seen on-air served as fodder for the next day's coverage assignments pioneering the "follow-up" concept of reporting in modern-day journalism. WATE also hired the market's first AMS-certified meteorologist in Knoxville and Eastern Tennessee in 1979 when Mark Mancuso joined the team.

In 1998, a news share agreement was established with Fox affiliate WTNZ (owned by Raycom Media). This resulted in Knoxville's original prime time newscast to debut. Branded as Fox 43 Ten O'Clock News, the nightly thirty-minute show featured a similar format to broadcasts seen on this station except for WTNZ's logo being present in the graphics. In 2002, it began to compete with another nightly newscast seen at 10 on then-WB (now CW) affiliate WBXX-TV. Produced by WBIR, this production offered as an alternative to WTNZ only aired for twelve minutes in an abbreviated format featuring the day's top stories along with an updated weather forecast. In early-March 2011, WTNZ terminated its outsourcing arrangement with WATE after entering into another contract with WBIR.

As a result, the latter station stopped producing the nightly update for WBXX. WBIR/WTNZ became the second news operation to upgrade to high definition on June 1 while WVLT was the first back on January 9, 2011. WATE's weekday noon show was cancelled on January 31, 2008, making the station Knoxville's only outlet without a newscast seen in the time period. On August 1, 2011, the station returned to the prime time newscast race with a new nightly 35 minute broadcast on WBXX (then owned by the Lockwood Broadcast Group) through an outsourcing agreement, under the branding The CW 20 News at 10.

On October 17, 2011, starting with their 5 p.m. newscast, WATE became the final station in the Knoxville market to broadcast in high definition. Along with the switch to HD, the station unveiled a new logo, new graphics, new studio set, and new news music: "Locals Only" by Stephen Arnold Music. The newscast on WBXX was initially not included in the upgrade as that station lacked a high definition-capable master control at its separate studios to transmit the newscast in HD. In early April 2012, that channel finally upgraded its master control to allow the WATE newscast and some other local and syndicated programming to be broadcast in HD.

On December 31, 2016, WATE-TV broadcast its final newscast on WBXX-TV, now owned by Gray Television. Co-owned Gray station WVLT-TV began producing newscasts on WBXX-TV the following day.

== Technical information ==
=== Subchannels ===
The station's signal is multiplexed:

Subchannels of WATE-TV
Subchannel	Res.	Short name	Programming
6.1	720p	WATE	ABC
6.2	720p	Antenna	Antenna TV
6.3	480i	Rewind	Rewind TV
6.4	480i	COZI TV	Cozi TV

WATE-TV carried The Country Network on its second subchannel in late 2010 until November 1, 2011, when WATE-TV's parent company, New Young Broadcasting terminated its deal with TCN, and dropped the channel on all of its stations. Subchannel 6.2 was relaunched on June 1, 2012, with the addition of Live Well Network, but was deactivated again on May 30, 2015. The subchannel is expected to be reactivated at a future date, featuring programming from the all-comedy network Laff, the result of an affiliation deal between Media General and Laff's owner, Katz Broadcasting. On February 1, 2016, GetTV began rolling out after a deal with Media General and Sony Pictures TV. WATE soon replaced GetTV with Antenna TV, although the short name was still "getTV". On September 1, 2021, Laff was replaced by SportsGrid, only for it to be replaced by Rewind TV on October 20, 2022.

=== Analog-to-digital conversion ===
WATE-TV shut down its analog signal, over VHF channel 6, on June 12, 2009, the official date on which full-power television stations in the United States transitioned from analog to digital broadcasts under federal mandate. The station's digital signal remained on its pre-transition UHF channel 26, using virtual channel 6. As with other Channel 6 stations around the country, on June 12, 2009, the unintentional broadcast of WATE-TV's audio signal also ceased on 87.7 FM.
