= WPXK-TV =

Television station in Jellico, Tennessee

- Jellico–Knoxville, Tennessee; United States
- City: Jellico, Tennessee
- Channels: Digital: 18 (UHF); Virtual: 54

Programming
- Affiliations: 54.1: Ion Television; for others, see § Subchannels

Ownership
- Owner: Ion Media; (Ion Television License, LLC)

History
- First air date: January 1993
- Former call signs: WPMC (1993–1998)
- Former channel numbers: Analog: 54 (UHF, 1993–2009); Digital: 23 (UHF, until 2019)
- Former affiliations: HSN (1993–1998, now on DT8)
- Call sign meaning: Pax TV Knoxville

Technical information
- Licensing authority: FCC
- Facility ID: 52628
- ERP: 1,000 kW
- HAAT: 512.5 m (1,681 ft)
- Transmitter coordinates: 36°0′19″N 83°56′23″W

Links
- Public license information: Public file; LMS
- Website: iontelevision.com

WPXK-TV (channel 54) is a television station licensed to Jellico, Tennessee, United States, broadcasting the Ion Television network to the Knoxville area. Owned by the Ion Media subsidiary of the E. W. Scripps Company, the station has offices on Executive Park Drive in west Knoxville, and its transmitter is located on Sharp's Ridge in North Knoxville. Despite Jellico being WPXK-TV's city of license, the station maintains no physical presence there.

Signing on the air in 1993 as WPMC with a small coverage area, it offered primarily religious and home shopping programming until August 1998 when it became WPXK-TV, joining the Pax TV network (the predecessor to Ion) and greatly increasing its signal coverage across the entire Knoxville market.

== Technical information ==
=== Subchannels ===
The station's signal is multiplexed:

Subchannels of WPXK-TV
Subchannel	Res.	Short name	Programming
54.1	720p	ION	Ion Television
54.2	480i	CourtTV	Court TV
54.3	480i	Laff	Laff
54.4	480i	Mystery	Ion Mystery
54.5	480i	BUSTED	Busted
54.6	480i	GameSho	Game Show Central
54.7	480i	QVC	QVC
54.8	480i	HSN	HSN
54.9	480i	QVC2	QVC2

=== Analog-to-digital conversion ===
WPXK-TV shut down its analog signal, over UHF channel 54, on June 12, 2009, the official date on which full-power television stations in the United States transitioned from analog to digital broadcasts under federal mandate. The station's digital signal remained on its pre-transition UHF channel 23, using virtual channel 54.
