= WVLT-TV =

Television station in Knoxville, Tennessee

- Knoxville, Tennessee; United States
- Channels: Digital: 34 (UHF); Virtual: 8
- Branding: WVLT; WVLT News

Programming
- Affiliations: 8.1: CBS; for others, see § Subchannels

Ownership
- Owner: Gray Media; (Gray Television Licensee, LLC)
- Sister stations: WBXX-TV

History
- First air date: October 18, 1953 (Note: Current license on channel 8 came into use on December 8, 1988, replacing the old license on channel 26.)
- Former call signs: WTSK-TV (1953–1955); WTVK (1955–1983); WTVK-TV (1983–1988); WKXT-TV (1988–1997)
- Former channel numbers: Analog: 26 (UHF, 1953–1988), 8 (VHF, 1988–2009); Digital: 30 (UHF, 1999–2019)
- Former affiliations: CBS (1953–1956); ABC (secondary 1953–1956; primary 1956–1979); DuMont (secondary, 1953–1956); NBC (1979–1988)
- Call sign meaning: "Volunteer TV", moniker adopted in 1997

Technical information
- Licensing authority: FCC
- Facility ID: 35908
- ERP: 1,000 kW
- HAAT: 551.5 m (1,809 ft)
- Transmitter coordinates: 35°59′44.4″N 83°57′23.1″W

Links
- Public license information: Public file; LMS
- Website: www.wvlt.tv

WVLT-TV (channel 8) is a television station in Knoxville, Tennessee, United States, affiliated with CBS and MyNetworkTV. It is owned by Gray Media alongside Crossville-licensed dual CW/Telemundo affiliate WBXX-TV (channel 20). The two stations share studios on Papermill Drive (near I-40/I-75) on the west side of Knoxville; WVLT-TV's transmitter is located on Sharp's Ridge in North Knoxville.

WVLT-TV traces its history to Knoxville's second-oldest television station, which signed on in 1953 as WTSK-TV on channel 26. The original owners sold it in 1954 to Indiana-based radio company South Central Broadcasting, who changed channel 26's call letters to WTVK two years later. As an ultra high frequency (UHF) station, it spent most of its first three decades on the air in a distant third place behind two very high frequency (VHF) competitors. At various times, it was an affiliate of all three major networks, each of which at one point abandoned WTVK to affiliate with a VHF station (CBS in 1956, ABC in 1979, and NBC in 1988).

Due to the struggles of being a UHF station in a mountainous area, channel 26's owners sought to move to the VHF band on several occasions from the 1950s onward. However, these came to nothing until the 1980s, with the addition of channel 8 as a "VHF drop-in"—an extra channel on the VHF band—to Knoxville. South Central merged with a competing applicant for channel 8, Tennessee Telecorp. The partnership won the channel 8 license and essentially moved WTVK there in November under a new call sign, WKXT-TV, with Tennessee Telecorp largely taking over management. After years of continued struggles in the ratings, Gray Communications Systems purchased the station in 1996; the new owners changed the call sign to WVLT-TV. The station has remained a ratings also-ran for most of the time despite Gray's efforts to expand the news operation.

== History ==
=== Construction of channel 26 ===
Harold H. Thoms and J. Horton Doughton, doing business as Television Services of Knoxville, applied with the Federal Communications Commission (FCC) on August 25, 1952, to build a new television station on Knoxville's channel 26; the application for a construction permit was granted on March 25, 1953, after W. R. Tuley—who had filed a competing bid for the channel—merged his application with the Thoms-Doughton group. The partners were out-of-town businessmen. Tuley, who took an 80 percent controlling interest in the station, had oil interests in Evansville, Indiana. Thoms owned WISE radio in Asheville, North Carolina, and Doughton was his partner in several other North Carolina television ventures. A site on Sharp's Ridge previously used by radio station WROL's shuttered FM operation was secured for use by the new channel 26.

WROL and competing channel 6 applicant WKGN merged their bids in July, and the race was suddenly on to be first to air in Knoxville and East Tennessee. Channel 26 took the call letters WTSK-TV, after its ownership group, and secured a primary network affiliation with CBS and secondary affiliations with the DuMont Television Network, and ABC. The first test pattern went out on the night of October 1, the same evening that WROL-TV (channel 6, now WATE-TV) started up; the station also aired a film that night, though after channel 6's first broadcast. Regular programming started on October 18, and WTSK was able to claim that it produced the first live television program in the city, as WROL-TV started with entirely filmed fare.

In 1954, Television Services of Knoxville sold the station to another Evansville–based concern, South Central Broadcasting; Tuley cited the need to devote time to his other business ventures in the Midwest as a factor in selling. Additionally, Television Services of Knoxville had been struggling financially, to the point that Tuley, Thoms, and Doughton had seriously considered shutting channel 26 down. South Central announced in September 1955 that it would seek approval to raise the station's effective radiated power from 21,900 to 314,000 watts and expand its transmitter facility; coinciding with the change, it also announced a new call sign, WTVK (for "Television Knoxville"). The call sign change took effect December 12, though it was not until early 1956 that the power boost took effect because of delays with a key part.

=== Pursuing a VHF channel ===
Channel 26 had grown since its start, but it was also a UHF station in the days before the All-Channel Receiver Act took effect in 1964. During WTVK's first decade on the air, most viewers needed to buy an expensive converter to watch the station. Additionally, the Knoxville market is very mountainous, and UHF stations have never gotten good reception in rugged terrain. As a result, from the 1950s onward, numerous proposals were floated to move the station to the stronger VHF band.

The first such proposal came in 1955 from Wilton E. Hall, owner of WAIM-TV (channel 40) in Anderson, South Carolina. In nearby Spartanburg, VHF station WSPA-TV (channel 7) had proposed a transmitter site move vigorously opposed by that area's two UHF stations, WAIM-TV and WGVL (channel 23). Hall proposed moving the channel 7 allocation to Knoxville for use by WTSK-TV, while reallocating channel 26 to Spartanburg. The FCC denied this and 34 similar requests in November, but South Central continued to be highly interested in the idea. In March 1956, South Central president John A. Engelbrecht warned that while WTVK could "marginally survive" with competition from just one VHF station, the impending arrival of WBIR-TV on channel 10 after years of hearings could either force the station off the air or at least result in the loss of its CBS affiliation. He also revealed that the 1954 sale by Television Services of Knoxville came as the firm was facing financial losses and weighing closing the station. WTVK also became active in other proceedings related to the contentious WSPA battle. One part of Engelbrecht's prediction came true; when WBIR-TV signed on, it immediately took the CBS affiliation, leaving WTVK with ABC.

In January 1960, the FCC proposed reducing the minimum mileage separation requirements between stations on the same channel and potential new channel assignments—"drop-ins"—where feasible. That October, WTVK formally petitioned the FCC to have channel 8 added to Knoxville. Knoxville was 162 miles (261 km) from WSIX-TV in Nashville and 152 miles (245 km) from WGTV at Athens, Georgia; while the spacing requirements required 190 miles (310 km) between the co-channel channel 8 stations, South Central Broadcasting believed that the terrain between Knoxville and each of those two cities would enable the use of channel 8 in east Tennessee. The FCC shelved the idea of granting 10 cities, including Knoxville, drop-ins in 1961. WTVK protested and appealed the decision in federal court, further pointing out that it was not able to compete effectively with channels 6 and 10 and that some advertisers did not want to buy time on a UHF station. However, the FCC, on a 4–3 vote and finding that the proposal might hinder the development of UHF broadcasting, closed the door on the controversial proposal in June 1963.

WTVK applied in late 1965 for a further power increase to 812,000 watts, the same week that another company proposed installing a 1,000,000-watt station on channel 14. The increase became effective in December 1966. Another VHF drop-in proposal that would have put channel 8 in Knoxville was floated in 1975 by the FCC at the request of the White House Office of Telecommunications Policy, but nothing emerged from this.

Under the circumstances, WTVK struggled for most of its tenure as an ABC affiliate. It did, however, acquire a revenue stream in 1969, when WKPT-TV signed on from Kingsport as an ABC affiliate. Since WKPT-TV's owners, Holston Valley Broadcasting, could not afford a direct network feed, Holston Valley paid South Central $100 per week to rebroadcast WTVK whenever ABC programming aired.

=== From ABC to NBC ===
This is a heckuva way to treat a station that has been a loyal ABC affiliate for more than 20 years.

— Duane Eastvold, general manager of WTVK

In the late 1970s, ABC—by then ascendant in the national ratings—began to look for better affiliates in some markets where it had been relegated to a third-rated VHF or UHF station. On March 29, 1979, WATE-TV announced it would leave NBC and become an ABC affiliate within six months, giving 15,000 to 20,000 additional homes access to ABC programs. WTVK station manager Duane Eastvold was rather perturbed at ABC's treatment of the station, as well as the late notification of the change. WTVK's compensation for carrying ABC programming had not increased in over 20 years. Moreover, channel 26 was caught completely unaware, informed only by a phone call from ABC before WATE announced the change on its 6 p.m. newscast. WTVK signed an affiliation agreement with NBC and began carrying its programming on September 17 of that year.

In 1980, WTVK was approved to increase its power one last time to the UHF maximum of five million watts. The full boost took effect in 1981, making channel 26 one of just 10 stations operating at that power level in the United States. Two years later, Freedom Newspapers contracted to buy WTVK from South Central, only to cancel the transaction within a month.

=== The battle for channel 8 ===
In September 1980, the FCC opened the door again to giving Knoxville a third VHF television service when it approved four drop-ins–for Knoxville (channel 8); Salt Lake City (channel 13); Charleston, West Virginia (channel 11); and Johnstown, Pennsylvania (channel 8). A group known as the "Organizing Committee", led by James R. Martin, was one of the most active suitors early on; WTVK, at that time in the middle of its increase to 5,000,000 watts, initially stayed out of the fray. Others, though, readied applications. By June 1981, there were 13 different applications on file for channel 8. One proposed a Christian station; another suggested a partial simulcast of Atlanta's WTBS with some local content; and others proposed a commercial independent station. One, however, was South Central Broadcasting itself. All 13 of these applications were designated for hearing in July 1982.

After more than three years, an FCC administrative law judge gave the initial nod to Tennessee Telecorp, Inc., owned by two employees of the Tennessee Valley Authority (with Olympic athlete Ralph Boston as a minority stockholder), in September 1985; the Telecorp application was selected based on media diversity and integration of staff and management. Four of the losing parties, including South Central, appealed the decision. The commission's review board overturned the administrative law judge's decision, in a shock to Tennessee Telecorp, and declared South Central the winner, with president John David Engelbrecht declaring it "the first good break we've got" in many years of fighting for a VHF assignment. One review board member wrote of WTVK's more than 30 years of good service to the community and noted that "the licensee of WTVK has acquired its surpassing entitlement to the new Knoxville VHF frequency the hard way: it earned it"; the opinion found that not awarding South Central the channel would have a "devastating impact" on its business.

Tennessee Telecorp appealed this finding to the full FCC. However, in August 1988, while the appellate process was still underway, Tennessee Telecorp and South Central were reported to have agreed to combine their bids, forming Knoxville Channel 8 Limited Partnership as the licensee for channel 8. The arrangement was finalized and announced on September 12, 1988, ending an eight-year contest for channel 8 and 33 years after the idea of moving WTVK to VHF was first floated. The new channel 8 would retain most of WTVK's employees, though Telecorp would mostly take over operations; its management team included three former officials at stations in the neighboring Tri-Cities market. Later, Tennessee Telecorp president Donald Bagwell claimed that the station would have been able to move to the VHF band four years sooner had the FCC weeded out non-serious applications, criticizing the FCC for allowing such bidders to be able to gain financial settlements in exchange for dismissing their filings.

=== Affiliation switch and channel switch ===
We were waiting for Channel 8 to drop in, but it never dropped in. It seemed like it was going to go on forever.

— Pierson Mapes, president of NBC

The long wait for WTVK to secure channel 8 would have repercussions that would be sorted out while it was still on channel 26. In June 1988, WBIR-TV announced it was dropping CBS for NBC—the latter of which had become the top-rated network then—after 32 years. After the network considered going to WATE-TV, CBS and WTVK reached an affiliation deal a month later, with the change taking place on September 10. NBC president Pierson Mapes revealed that the delay in moving WTVK from UHF to VHF was a factor, as was WBIR-TV's dominance in local news.

With the affiliation switch in the rear-view mirror, the process then began of replacing the UHF transmission facility with a VHF one. At the end of November 1988, the channel 26 transmitter went on reduced power and the station dropped its newscasts. After a delay attributed to faulty connectors in the antenna and high winds, the new channel 8 went on the air at 4 p.m. on December 8, 1988, under the call letters WKXT-TV. For a time, it operated at low power. (Note: The channel 26 license was then surrendered. The channel was never returned to use.)

WKXT inherited WTVK's CBS affiliation and syndicated programming, as well as channel 26's studio on Sharp's Ridge. However, the move from the UHF band to the VHF band was more than a technical overhaul. Per the agreement, Telecorp partners assumed all of the senior management positions at the new channel 8. The new general manager, Lewis F. Cosby, told reporters at a press event to announce the station's new news team that ratings-challenged WTVK would "become part of that big TV station in the sky".

In 1992, South Central sold its stake in WKXT to Phipps Television, full owner of WCTV in Tallahassee, Florida, and 50-percent owner of WPBF in West Palm Beach, Florida. As part of the $5.77 million deal, Tennessee Telecorp also sold part of its stake in channel 8 to Phipps, giving it a 70-percent controlling interest. Under Phipps, WKXT moved its studios from Sharp's Ridge to the present Papermill Road site in 1993. The new studio site was chosen to be more efficient and closer to advertisers, and South Central, which owned the property, was purchasing radio stations in Knoxville and planning on moving them into the former channel 26 building.

=== "Volunteer TV" ===
Phipps and the minority partners in Knoxville Channel 8 Limited Partnership agreed to sell WCTV and WKXT to Gray Communications Systems (now Gray Media) at the end of 1995, with the sale consummated in 1996. (Many of the partners then briefly owned WINT-TV, channel 20.) The new owners changed the call sign to the current WVLT-TV on February 10, 1997, as part of a major investment in the station and its news product.

WVLT-TV began programming a secondary service as a digital subchannel in 2004: "UPN Knoxville", which replaced prior low-power carrier WEEE-LP. This service assumed the MyNetworkTV affiliation in September 2006, first as "MyEastTennesseeTV" and later as "MyVLT-2". Some local programming has also aired on the MyVLT channel, such as high school football.

Gray expanded its Knoxville operation in 2015 when it purchased WBXX-TV from Lockwood Broadcast Group. The deal was part of a like-kind exchange in which Lockwood received KAKE in Wichita, Kansas—which needed to be sold so Gray could purchase Schurz Communications—and Gray received WBXX and $11.2 million in cash. At the time, Knoxville was the company's largest media market.

== Local programming ==
=== News operation ===
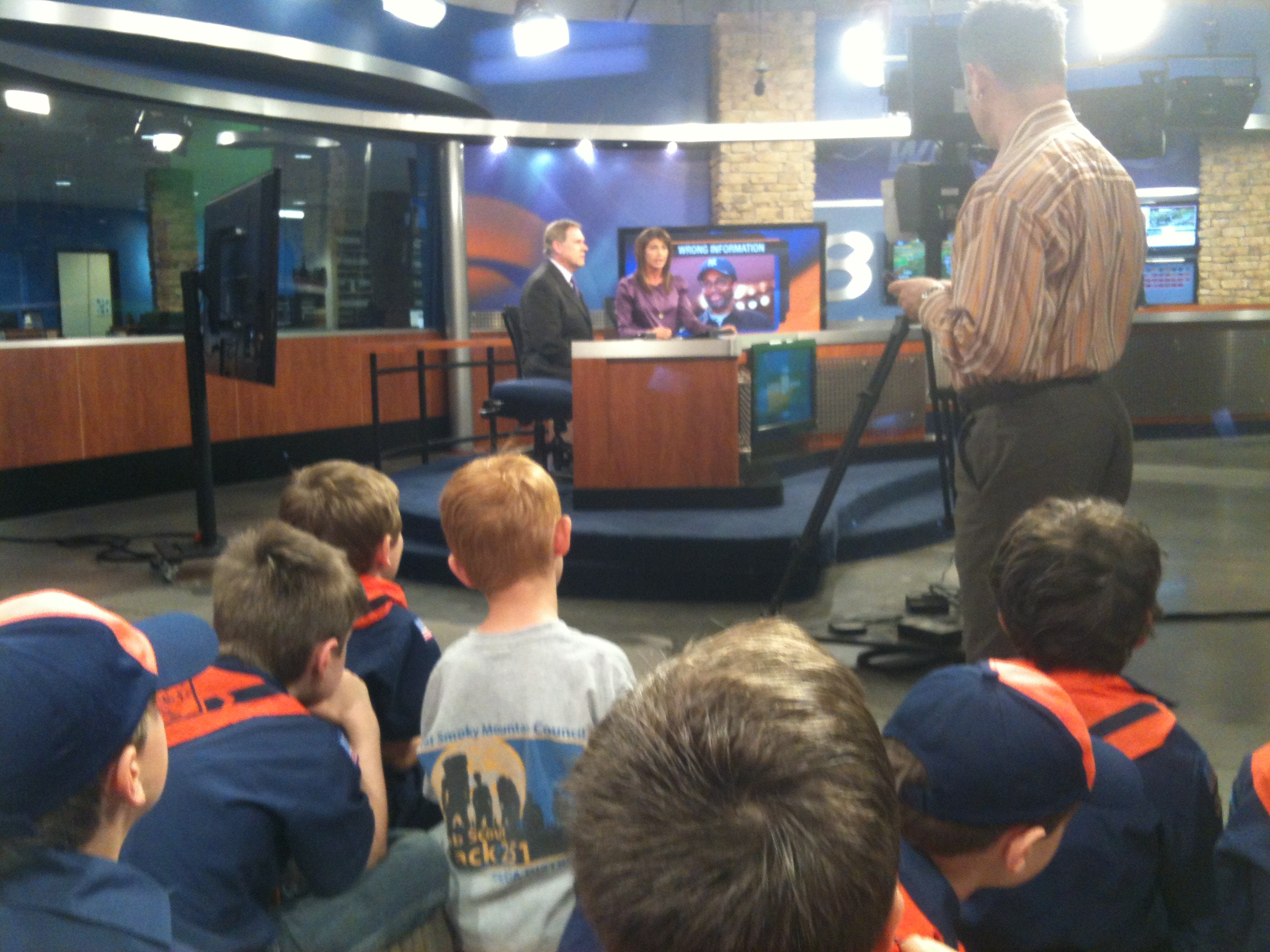
Local Cub Scouts watch the production of a WVLT newscast in 2012

WTVK was traditionally Knoxville's third-rated source for news, far behind the two VHF stations—a status that has continued to hold true even since the VHF shift in 1988. However, it did have its moments. In 1982, the station secured a contract to broadcast live from the Sunsphere during the 1982 World's Fair, airing Today at the 1982 World's Fair. The Sunsphere show continued after the fair and ended in February 1983.

News was one of the priority areas for the WKXT-TV relaunch, which included an entirely new main anchor team. However, the station's newscasts continued to rate poorly. Facing an advertising slump, in 1991, channel 8 axed its 11 p.m. weeknight and weekend newscasts and fired 10 staffers; morning cut-ins and the noon and early evening programs were maintained.

In 1997, as part of the WVLT-TV relaunch, channel 8 boosted its news staff from 10 to 55 people and reinstated weeknight 11 p.m. and weekend newscasts; it also added an hour-long morning newscast. At the time, the outgoing WKXT-TV newscasts captured just four percent of the 6 p.m. audience, compared with 22 percent for WATE and 45 percent tuned to WBIR-TV. The next year, WVLT began producing local news for Fox affiliate WTNZ, an arrangement that lasted three years until the station opted to work with WATE-TV instead.

On January 9, 2011, channel 8's 11 p.m. newscast became the first in the Knoxville market to originate in high definition. On April 20, 2013, WVLT became the last station in the market to add a weekend morning newscast.

=== Sports ===
In 2007, WVLT and the Vol Network, the broadcasting arm of the University of Tennessee's athletic department, entered into a new 10-year agreement for WVLT to be the exclusive home of all Vol TV Network programing in the Knoxville area. WVLT paid UT $4.95 million for the 10-year contract, giving it exclusive rights to the weekly highlights shows featuring the head coaches of the football, men's basketball, and women's basketball teams, as well as other UT athletic-related programs in the Knoxville market. With this, the Vol TV Network ended a 10-year relationship with NBC affiliate WBIR-TV.

=== Former on-air staff ===
- Adele Arakawa – reporter and anchor, 1981–1983
- Johnny Mountain – public affairs director and weatherman, 1969–1977
- Topper Shutt – meteorologist, 1984–1987

== Technical information ==
=== Subchannels ===
WVLT-TV broadcasts from a transmitter on Sharp's Ridge. The station's signal is multiplexed:

Subchannels of WVLT-TV
| Subchannel | Res. | Short name | Programming |
|---|---|---|---|
| 8.1 | 1080i | WVLT | CBS |
| 8.2 | 720p | MYVLT | Tennessee Valley SEN / MyNetworkTV |
| 8.3 | 480i | START | Start TV |
| 8.4 | 480i | WVLT365 | 365BLK |
| 8.5 | 480i | Oxygen | Oxygen |
| 8.6 | 480i | Charge! | Charge! |

=== Analog to digital conversion ===
WVLT-TV shut down its analog signal, over VHF channel 8, on June 12, 2009, the official date on which full-power television stations in the United States transitioned from analog to digital broadcasts under federal mandate. The station's digital signal remained on its pre-transition UHF channel 30, using virtual channel 8.

As part of the SAFER Act, WVLT-TV kept its analog signal on the air until June 26 to inform viewers of the digital television transition through a loop of public service announcements from the National Association of Broadcasters.
