= WPXV-TV =

Television station in Norfolk, Virginia

- Norfolk, Virginia; United States
- Channels: Digital: 32 (UHF); Virtual: 49

Programming
- Affiliations: 49.1: Ion Television; for others, see § Subchannels

Ownership
- Owner: Inyo Broadcast Holdings (sale to the E. W. Scripps Company pending); (Inyo Broadcast Licenses LLC)

History
- First air date: May 29, 1989
- Former call signs: WJCB (1989–1998)
- Former channel numbers: Analog: 49 (UHF, 1989–2009); Digital: 46 (UHF, until 2020)
- Former affiliations: Religious Ind. (1989–1997); inTV (1997–1998)
- Call sign meaning: Pax Virginia

Technical information
- Licensing authority: FCC
- Facility ID: 67077
- HAAT: 348 m (1,142 ft)
- Transmitter coordinates: 36°49′0″N 76°28′5″W

Links
- Public license information: Public file; LMS
- Website: iontelevision.com

WPXV-TV (channel 49) is a television station licensed to Norfolk, Virginia, United States, serving as the Ion Television affiliate for the Hampton Roads area. Owned by Inyo Broadcast Holdings, the station has studios on Nansemond Parkway in Suffolk, Virginia, adjacent to the transmitter tower it shares with ABC affiliate WVEC (channel 13).

== History ==
=== WJCB ===
On August 9, 1985, Tidewater Christian Communications received the construction permit for a new channel 49 television station at Norfolk. Tidewater Christian, controlled by several Black ministers from Hampton Roads-area churches, set up shop in the former WVEC studios in Hampton and built WJCB. The station would broadcast religious programming and family-oriented secular shows. The first general manager was Dwight Green, son of Church of God in Christ bishop Samuel L. Green Jr.

Channel 49 signed on the air May 29, 1989. At the outset, WJCB was hampered by a weak signal, and local cable companies refused to add the new station to their lineups. It did not appear on some Hampton Roads systems until must-carry rules were reinstated in 1993.

In 1994, WJCB went through a management change, as stockholders successfully pushed for a court order to install a new board to manage the money-losing station. Under new management, WJCB added home shopping programming from ViaTV in 1994, in an attempt to boost its revenue. A year later, the station dropped ViaTV for programs from the new America One network and Infomall, an infomercial service owned by Paxson Communications Corporation; these aired alongside music videos and religious programs.

Lockwood Broadcasting purchased WJCB from Tidewater Christian Communications in 1996 for $6.75 million. Lockwood already owned a network of low-power TV stations headed by WPEN-LP. The company moved to spend $1.5 million on an improved transmitter for channel 49 and new studio facilities and to move the syndicated inventory of WPEN to the full-power station.

Lockwood had no intention of selling the newly purchased WJCB; however, Paxson presented it with an offer to buy the station for $14.75 million—more than twice what Lockwood had paid to purchase it from Tidewater Christian—and the sale to Paxson was announced in December.

=== WPXV-TV ===
WPXV "Pax 49" logo, used from 1998 to 2005.

Paxson Communications changed the WJCB call letters to WPXV on March 2, 1998. Religious programming and infomercials as well as shopping programming continued to air on WPXV until August 31, when the station started airing Pax programming in the late afternoons and evenings with infomercials and religious programming during the day, with the launch of the then-new Pax network. WPXV aired rebroadcasts of WAVY-TV's 6 p.m. and 11 p.m. weeknight newscasts at 7 p.m. and 11:30 p.m. weeknights from 2003 to 2004 and had master control in WAVY's studios until 2004 when Paxson and NBC broke up the agreement.

Following E. W. Scripps Company's purchase of Ion Media in 2021, WPXV lost its status as an Ion owned-and-operated station when it was sold along with 22 other stations to Inyo Broadcast Holdings to comply with FCC rules (as Scripps had already owned WTKR and WGNT).

Scripps announced its repurchase of all Inyo stations on February 26, 2026.

== Technical information ==
=== Subchannels ===
The station's signal is multiplexed:

Subchannels of WPXV-TV
Subchannel	Res.	Short name	Programming
49.1	720p	ION	Ion Television
49.2	480i	Laff	Laff
49.3	480i	Mystery	Ion Mystery
49.4	480i	IONPlus	Ion Plus
49.5	480i	BUSTED	Busted
49.6	480i	GameSho	Game Show Central
49.7	480i	QVC	QVC
49.8	480i	HSN	HSN

The Worship Network was previously seen on WPXV-TV's fourth digital subchannel; however, Ion dropped The Worship Network on all Ion owned and operated stations on January 31, 2010, at midnight.

=== Analog-to-digital conversion ===
WPXV-TV ended regular programming on its analog signal, over UHF channel 49, on June 12, 2009, as part of the federally mandated transition from analog to digital television. The station's digital signal remained on its pre-transition UHF channel 46, using virtual channel 49.
