= WSKY-TV =

Television station in Manteo, North Carolina

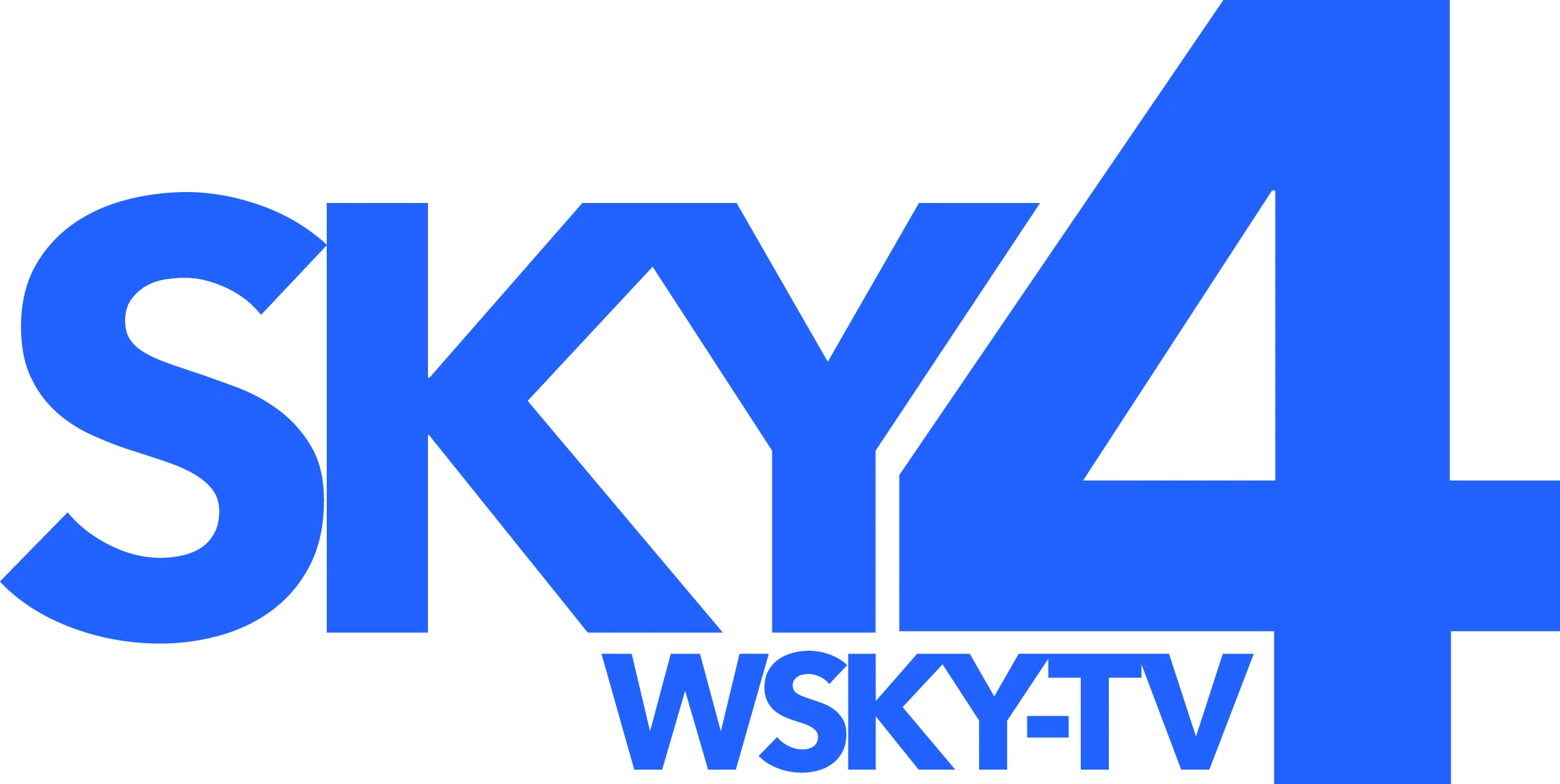
- Manteo, North Carolina; Chesapeake–Norfolk–; Virginia Beach, Virginia; United States
- City: Manteo, North Carolina
- Channels: Digital: 13 (VHF); Virtual: 4
- Branding: SKY 4

Programming
- Affiliations: 4.1: Independent; for others, see § Subchannels

Ownership
- Owner: Lockwood Broadcast Group; (Tidewater TV LLC)

History
- Founded: March 9, 2001
- First air date: October 19, 2001
- Former channel numbers: Analog: 4 (VHF, 2001–2006); Digital: 4 (VHF, 2006–2010), 9 (VHF, 2010–2020)
- Call sign meaning: The word "sky"; named for its original owner, Sky Television, LLC

Technical information
- Licensing authority: FCC
- Facility ID: 76324
- ERP: 70 kW
- HAAT: 306 m (1,004 ft)
- Transmitter coordinates: 36°31′15″N 76°18′15″W

Links
- Public license information: Public file; LMS
- Website: www.sky4tv.com

WSKY-TV (channel 4) is an independent television station licensed to Manteo, North Carolina, United States, serving the Hampton Roads area. It is the flagship station of the Hampton, Virginia–based Lockwood Broadcast Group, and has studios on Salters Creek Road in Hampton; its transmitter is located near South Mills, North Carolina. Despite WSKY-TV being licensed to Manteo, the station maintains no physical presence there.

== History ==
The history of WSKY-TV can be traced as early as 1995, when the FCC invited filings for a license to operate a television station in Manteo on channel 4. Six groups applied for the license.

Before its fall 2001 launch, channel 4 on Cox Cable housed LNC or Local News on Cable, WVEC-TV's 24-hour cable news television station. When WSKY launched, LNC moved up to channel 5 on Cox Cable lineups.

The station's analog signal signed off in late November 2006, as its digital signal was to sign-on from a new tower in Camden County, North Carolina. WSKY had some challenges covering the northern part of the market (Williamsburg, Newport News, Hampton) on its analog signal, which was to be remedied with its new digital tower.

Between 6 and 7 a.m. on March 2, 2007, in high winds during storms moving through the area, WSKY-DT's tower collapsed, also destroying the transmitter building. The tower was three weeks away from completion. The tower was rebuilt and finished in November 2007. WSKY-DT started broadcasting a test pattern on November 24, 2007, and it began regular broadcasts on November 27, 2007.

On January 1, 2009, DirecTV removed the channel from its lineup. The station erroneously did not re-elect for must-carry status on the provider for the next three years, and it had no regulatory recourse otherwise to remain on DirecTV. After waiting out the three-year period and successfully filing for must-carry status, the station returned to the DirecTV lineup on January 1, 2012.

On July 15, 2013, Lockwood Broadcast Group announced it would be acquiring 51% of WSKY-TV pending FCC approval. The sale was finalized on November 25.

== Newscasts ==
Since its inception, WSKY-TV has aired no local news programming of its own. However, it did air two 11 p.m. weeknight newscasts from CBS affiliate WTKR during that station's coverage of the 2009 NCAA Division I men's basketball tournament. WTKR did broadcast late newscasts at midnight when the coverage concluded.

== Technical information ==
=== Subchannels ===
The station's signal is multiplexed:

Subchannels of WSKY-TV
| Subchannel | Res. | Short name | Programming |
|---|---|---|---|
| 4.1 | 1080i | WSKY-HD | Main WSKY-TV programming |
| 4.2 | 480i | StartTV | Start TV |
| 4.3 | 480i | Movies! | Movies! |
| 4.4 | 480i | Buzzr | Buzzr |
| 4.5 | 480i | Catchy | Catchy Comedy |
| 4.6 | 480i | MeTOONS | MeTV Toons |
| 4.7 | 480i | | MovieSphere Gold |

=== Analog-to-digital conversion ===
WSKY-TV discontinued regular programming on its analog signal, over VHF channel 4, in November 2006. The station's digital signal moved to VHF channel 9, in mid-May 2010, using virtual channel 4.
