= WTNZ =

Television station in Knoxville, Tennessee

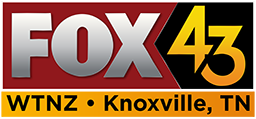

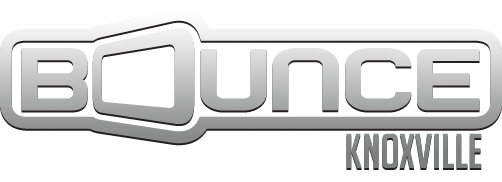
- Knoxville, Tennessee; United States
- Channels: Digital: 15 (UHF); Virtual: 43
- Branding: Fox 43; Bounce TV Knoxville (43.2)

Programming
- Affiliations: 43.1: Fox; 43.2: Bounce TV; 43.3: Grit

Ownership
- Owner: Lockwood Broadcast Group; (Marble City TV, LLC)
- Sister stations: WKNX-TV

History
- First air date: December 31, 1983
- Former call signs: WKCH-TV (1983–1994)
- Former channel numbers: Analog: 43 (UHF, 1983–2009); Digital: 34 (UHF, until 2019)
- Former affiliations: Independent (1983–1987)
- Call sign meaning: Tennessee

Technical information
- Licensing authority: FCC
- Facility ID: 19200
- ERP: 280 kW
- HAAT: 529 m (1,736 ft)
- Transmitter coordinates: 35°59′44.4″N 83°57′23.1″W

Links
- Public license information: Public file; LMS
- Website: www.wtnzfox43.com

WTNZ (channel 43) is a television station in Knoxville, Tennessee, United States, affiliated with the Fox network. It is owned by Lockwood Broadcast Group alongside WKNX-TV (channel 7), an independent station. The two stations share studios on Executive Park Drive (along I-75/I-40) in Knoxville's Green Valley section; WTNZ's transmitter is located on Sharp's Ridge in North Knoxville.

== History ==
Knoxville Family Television, Limited Partnership, was granted a construction permit on November 3, 1982, to build a station on Knoxville's channel 43; the proposal from Knoxville Family beat out another by Marvin E. Palmquist, who owned WQRF-TV in his hometown of Rockford, Illinois. Channel 43 had previously been used for several years by WBIR-TV as a UHF relay to aid areas in the city of Knoxville that did not receive a satisfactory picture on VHF and was discontinued upon an upgrade to the VHF facility.

From studios on Central Street, WKCH-TV made its debut on the evening of December 31, 1983—with introductory remarks that then had to be repeated because the audio was not broadcast the first time. It was the city's first independent station (WINT-TV was on the air in Crossville, but its plans to move into Knoxville were delayed by more than a decade). It was also the first new full-market commercial station in Knoxville since WBIR-TV signed on 27 years earlier.

Like a number of other independent stations, management affairs were primarily controlled by Media Central, which provided consulting and other services to independent stations and owned much of channel 43. Media Central's independent stations, WKCH-TV included, spurned Fox when it launched in 1986, but it joined the network the next year.

Media Central filed for bankruptcy protection in 1987, and channel 43 would remain in that status for more than two years. A bankruptcy court judge approved the sale of WKCH-TV to NewSouth Broadcasting, owned by Timothy S. Brumlik, in June 1989. However, as the deal was pending at the Federal Communications Commission (FCC), the proceedings were jolted when Brumlik was arrested by federal and Florida officials on money laundering charges connected to Colombian drug interests. Officials alleged that Brumlik's ownership of TeleOnce in Puerto Rico was a front for two important Latin American media men: Remigio Ángel González, reported to be a business partner with Manuel Noriega in a Panamanian television station, and Julio Vera Gutiérrez, a Peruvian citizen. In November 1989, a motion was filed by WKCH-TV's trustee to cancel the proposed sale to Brumlik, citing the uncertainty created by the money laundering case. Even despite the continued uncertainty over channel 43's future ownership, the station grew and was recognized as one of the fastest-growing Fox affiliates.

FCVS Communications, which owned WACH in Columbia, South Carolina, bought WKCH-TV in 1990. Under FCVS, the station increased its community involvement and improved its transmission facilities. In 1993, FCVS received an "offer it could not refuse" from Ellis Communications and sold its broadcast holdings: WKCH-TV, WACH, and WEVU-TV in Naples, Florida.

Ellis made further improvements, including changing the call sign to WTNZ and relocating the studio to Executive Park Drive in 1994. Ellis Communications was then folded into Raycom Media in late 1996.

On June 25, 2018, Raycom Media announced that it agreed to be sold to Gray Television. Gray kept its existing duopoly of WVLT-TV and WBXX-TV and sold WTNZ to a third party; on August 20, 2018, Gray sold WTNZ, along with fellow Fox affiliates WFXG in Augusta, Georgia, WPGX in Panama City, Florida, and WDFX-TV in Dothan, Alabama, to Lockwood Broadcast Group (owner of independent station WKNX-TV). The sale was completed on January 2, 2019.

== Newscasts ==
Not long after going on the air, channel 43 began producing short news breaks.

In 1998, WTNZ established a news share agreement with WVLT-TV to produce its first local newscast, the Fox 43 Ten O'Clock News. Liz Tedone, Patrick McMurtry, Nick Paranjape, and Craig Edwards anchored the news, weather and sports for the half-hour nightly newscast; the talent, separate from the presenters for WVLT's own newscasts, were absorbed by channel 8 itself in 2000. In 2001, Fox 43 ended its agreement with WVLT and entered into a similar contract with ABC-affiliated WATE-TV; channel 8 thought it was not financially feasible to continue, while WATE thought it was.

After 10 years, the WTNZ-WATE collaboration ended, and WTNZ entered into an agreement with NBC affiliate WBIR-TV to produce local news. On March 28, 2011, WBIR took over production of the nightly newscast and expanded it to one hour on weeknights. Later that year, a two-hour morning show produced by WBIR-TV was also added. Prior to producing the WTNZ newscasts, WBIR had produced a 10-minute 10 p.m. newscast for WBXX-TV (channel 20); WATE-TV took over those duties from WBIR and expanded that program to a full 35 minutes. A half-hour 6:30 p.m. newscast from WBIR-TV was added in 2017.

== Technical information ==
=== Subchannels ===
The station's signal is multiplexed:

Subchannels of WTNZ
Subchannel	Res.	Short name	Programming
43.1	720p	WTNZ-DT	Fox
43.2	480i	WTNZ-BN	Bounce TV
43.3	480i	WTNZ-GT	Grit

=== Analog-to-digital conversion ===
WTNZ shut down its analog signal, over UHF channel 43, on June 12, 2009, the official date on which full-power television stations in the United States transitioned from analog to digital broadcasts under federal mandate. The station's digital signal remained on its pre-transition UHF channel 34, using virtual channel 43.
