= WPEN-LP =

Television station in Hampton, Virginia (1989–2001)

- Logo used in 1996
- Hampton, Virginia; United States
- Channels: Analog: 68 (UHF)
- Branding: WPEN-TV

Programming
- Affiliations: Independent (1991–1998); The Box (1998–2001)

Ownership
- Owner: Lockwood Broadcast Group

History
- First air date: 1989
- Last air date: 2001
- Former call signs: W68BI (1985–1995); WPEN-LP (1995–2001)
- Call sign meaning: Peninsula

Technical information
- Facility ID: 38238
- Class: TX
- ERP: 12.7 kW
- HAAT: 105 m (344 ft)
- Transmitter coordinates: 37°0′54″N 76°23′2.41″W

WPEN-LP (channel 68) was a low-power television station licensed to Hampton, Virginia, United States, which served the Hampton Roads television market. The station began broadcasting in 1985; it then changed call signs to WPEN-LP on March 20, 1995. During its time on the air, it was an independent station, then picking up an affiliation with The Box, and later MTV2, before signing off in 2002. WPEN-LP was not related to the Philadelphia radio station WPEN (now WKDN).

== History ==
Two of the three low-power television stations that became "WPEN" started as separate entities. The oldest was W68BI channel 68, originally licensed to Driver, which was authorized in 1985 as a rebroadcaster of the Trinity Broadcasting Network but instead came on the air in August 1989 as an owned-and-operated station of Channel America. The second was W51BH "WBH", which went on the air from Gloucester on September 1, 1989. "WBH", owned by Lee Bowen, offered local news coverage focusing on the Peninsula and older syndicated fare. Beyond its own affiliation with Channel America, local productions included high school sporting events.

In 1994, Lockwood Broadcasting, an affiliate of rigging firm Lockwood Brothers, acquired "WBH" from Bowen and began operating it as "WPEN". It then bought W68BI; by this time, channel 51 programming included a country line-dance program and Baltimore Orioles baseball games. Lockwood added a third low-power station, W62CN channel 62 at Norfolk, to reach homes in the southern portion of Hampton Roads, and the station was added to cable systems in the market. Lockwood also reached a deal with WVEC to produce a 10 p.m. newscast for the station. WPEN appeared in the Hampton Roads Nielsen ratings in 1996—a first for a low-power station in a top-40 market.

In late 1996, Lockwood acquired a full-power television station, WJCB (channel 49). The company planned to spend $1.5 million on an improved transmitter for channel 49 and new studio facilities and to move the syndicated inventory of WPEN to the full-power station. However, Lockwood received an unsolicited offer from Paxson Communications to purchase the station for $14.75 million—twice what Lockwood had paid—and accepted the offer in late 1997.

Cox Communications cable opted to drop WPEN from its lineup in October 1998, a decision that Lockwood said "killed" the station and deprived it of much of its viewership. As a result, the station dropped its independent local programming lineup and affiliated with The Box, a music video network, beginning November 1 of that year.

WPEN-LP and its translators filed to go dark in February 2001. The licenses were deleted in September 2001 and April 2002.
