= Mark Mancuso =

American television meteorologist

Mark Mancuso (born in West Newton, Massachusetts) is an American meteorologist formerly employed by The Weather Channel in Atlanta, Georgia and formerly with AccuWeather in State College, Pennsylvania. He graduated from Pennsylvania State University with a B.S. in Meteorology.

== Career ==
Mark was a meteorologist for WITN-TV in Washington, North Carolina. In the 1970s and early 1980s he held the chief meteorologist position at WATE-TV in Knoxville, Tennessee. In 1982, he joined The Weather Channel as one of the original on-camera meteorologists. His specialties include satellite and radar interpretation, short range forecasting, weather observing, and tropical meteorology. He was laid off from The Weather Channel on February 1, 2009 and left his job at The AccuWeather Channel in late 2023 after 14 years. He now works for WTAJ-TV.

He also made a short appearance in the movie Home Alone 3.

== Family ==
Mark has twin girls, one son, and one cat.
