= Terry Zahn =

American news reporter (1946–2000)

Terry Alan Zahn (April 27, 1946 – January 25, 2000) was a television reporter and anchorman in Hampton Roads, Virginia, from 1981 until his death in 2000 from multiple myeloma (a type of blood cancer).

== Biography ==
Zahn was Born in Milwaukee, Wisconsin, on April 27, 1946. He graduated from the University of Wisconsin-Milwaukee with a Bachelor of Arts in 1968. In 1974, he received his master's degree from the University of Hawaii in Honolulu.

In 1969, Zahn served in the U.S. Navy. After serving in the military, he briefly had a stint with KTIV. In 1981, after briefly serving as an anchor and news director for WQAD-TV in Moline, Illinois, Zahn moved to WAVY-TV in Portsmouth, Virginia, where he would remain until 1994, when he moved to WVEC-TV. During his tenure under WVEC, Zahn received awards from the Associated Press, United Press International, and the Virginia Association of Broadcasters.

== Cancer ==
Zahn was first diagnosed with cancer in the late 1990s. Prior to his diagnosis, he had been active in planning the Hampton Roads area Relay For Life and a supporter of the American Cancer Society. Zahn produced a series of television news stories and a documentary program about his battle with cancer. The program, which aired on WVEC-TV, was entitled "My Race Against Cancer." The program chronicled his medical progress and personal ordeal from the time of his diagnosis until his cancer went into remission. At WVEC, Zahn produced two nationally distributed videos for the American Cancer Society encouraging communities to hold Relay For Life events. Zahn toured the United States to promote Relay For Life and continued his involvement with Relay until his death. He was inducted into the American Cancer Society Relay For Life Hall of Fame in 1999.

At the time of his death, Zahn lived in Chesapeake, Virginia, where he is buried.
