= WEEE-LP =

Television station in Knoxville, Tennessee (1990s–2006)

- Knoxville, Tennessee; United States
- Channels: Analog: 32 (UHF)
- Branding: UPN 32 Knoxville (1997–2004); WEEE 32 (2004–2006)

Programming
- Affiliations: TBN (1990s–1997); UPN (1997–2004); Independent (2004–2006); FamilyNet (secondary, 1997?–2004); Urban America Television (secondary, 2001–2004); Jewelry Television (secondary, 2004–2006)

Ownership
- Owner: Tiger Eye Broadcasting Corporation
- Sister stations: WKXE-LP

History
- First air date: Mid-1990s (as a TBN translator); 1997 (as a stand-alone station)
- Last air date: 2006
- Former call signs: W32BQ (CP, 1995–1998); WHVI-LP (1998–1999)

Technical information
- Licensing authority: FCC
- Facility ID: 47724
- Class: TX
- ERP: 1 kW
- HAAT: 175 m (574 ft)
- Transmitter coordinates: 35°57′45.99″N 84°1′22.95″W

Links
- Public license information: LMS

WEEE-LP (channel 32) was a low-power television station in Knoxville, Tennessee, United States. The station was owned by Tiger Eye Broadcasting Corporation alongside independent station WKXE-LP. WEEE-LP's transmitter was located in northern Knoxville.

== History ==
=== Beginnings as a TBN translator ===
At some time between 1992 and 1996, Knoxville's channel 32 began as W32BQ. For its first few years on the air, it served as a locally based translator of the Trinity Broadcasting Network, repeating the signal of flagship KTBN-TV in Santa Ana, California.

=== UPN affiliation ===
At some point in 1997, the station was sold to Tiger Eye Broadcasting Corporation. After the sale was finalized, the station changed the call letters to WEEE-LP. At that time, the station began serving as Knoxville's original affiliate of UPN from 1997 until 2004. During that time, in order to fill the programming day outside of UPN prime time, the station also had a secondary affiliation with FamilyNet and, beginning in 2001, Urban America Television. The station shared the affiliations with both UATV and FamilyNet with Heiskell-licensed WFEM-LP (channel 12) to make all FamilyNet and UATV programming available. The station's profile as a UPN outlet was raised significantly in 2001 when Buffy the Vampire Slayer moved networks; some UPN programming had been seen on WB affiliate WBXX-TV (channel 20).

=== Decline and closeure ===
In April 2004, UPN signed an affiliation agreement with local CBS affiliate WVLT-TV (channel 8), moving to its second digital subchannel. As professional wrestling had been its highest-rated programming as a UPN affiliate, WEEE-LP retooled with wrestling and other programming targeting young men. When UPN programming moved to WVLT on June 28, 2004, WEEE-LP lost local cable carriage. From that point until its closure in 2006, the station also ran programming from Jewelry Television during the overnight and early morning hours. With no major network affiliation and the lack of any meaningful local revenue, the station soon left the airwaves permanently.

WEEE-LP's license was surrendered to the Federal Communications Commission (FCC) and canceled on March 31, 2021.
