= WVEC =

Television station in Hampton, Virginia

- Hampton–Norfolk–Virginia Beach, Virginia; United States
- City: Hampton, Virginia
- Channels: Digital: 35 (UHF); Virtual: 13
- Branding: 13News Now

Programming
- Affiliations: 13.1: ABC; for others, see § Technical information

Ownership
- Owner: Tegna Inc., a subsidiary of Nexstar Media Group; (WVEC Television, LLC)
- Sister stations: Nexstar: WAVY-TV, WVBT

History
- First air date: September 19, 1953
- Former channel numbers: Analog: 15 (UHF, 1953–1958), 13 (VHF, 1959–2009); Digital: 41 (UHF, 2002–2009), 13 (VHF, 2009–2020), 11 (VHF, 2020–2024)
- Former affiliations: NBC (1953–1959)

Technical information
- Licensing authority: FCC
- Facility ID: 74167
- ERP: 1,000 kW
- HAAT: 363.9 m (1,194 ft)
- Transmitter coordinates: 36°49′0″N 76°28′5″W

Links
- Public license information: Public file; LMS
- Website: www.13newsnow.com

WVEC (channel 13) is a television station licensed to Hampton, Virginia, United States, serving the Hampton Roads area as an affiliate of ABC. It is owned by the Tegna subsidiary of Nexstar Media Group; Nexstar owns NBC affiliate WAVY-TV (channel 10) and Fox affiliate WVBT (channel 43). WVEC's studios are located on Woodis Avenue in Norfolk; its transmitter is located near Driver in Suffolk.

WVEC began broadcasting on UHF channel 15 on September 19, 1953, from studios in Hampton. It was the second television station in Hampton Roads and broke the monopoly on television programming and affiliations held by WTAR-TV (now WTKR), which broadcast on a VHF channel. The station was originally an NBC affiliate; NBC provided pre-launch support to the new station, at a time when UHF stations could only be seen by viewers with specially fitted converters. The station was a modestly successful second-place outlet until 1957, when Hampton Roads gained a second VHF station: WAVY-TV in Portsmouth, originally the ABC affiliate. WVEC-TV lost viewers and some NBC programs to the new VHF station, which could be seen in all homes. It was successful in encouraging the Federal Communications Commission to allocate a third VHF channel, channel 13, to Hampton Roads. It merged with the other applicants for the channel, and WVEC-TV moved to channel 13 on November 13, 1959. It simultaneously opened its current Norfolk studio and switched to a full-time ABC affiliation. The channel 15 facilities were then used for educational television by WHRO-TV, which began in 1961.

The station's limited local news efforts gradually expanded in the 1970s and in the 1980s after Corinthian Broadcasting and the A. H. Belo Corporation in turn acquired channel 13. The bulk of station operations shifted to Norfolk, and after WTKR experienced a collapse in its news ratings in the mid-1980s, WAVY and WVEC began contending for first place in the market. In partnership with Cox Communications and The Virginian-Pilot newspaper in Norfolk, WVEC launched a local cable news channel, Local News on Cable, in 1997; it operated until 2010 and for most of that time featured an original 10 p.m. local newscast co-produced with The Virginian-Pilot. Belo sold the station to the Gannett Company, predecessor to Tegna, in 2013. Tegna's sale to Nexstar Media Group in 2026 brought WVEC under common ownership with WAVY-TV and Fox affiliate WVBT.

== History ==
=== The channel 15 era ===
The Peninsula Broadcasting Corporation—owner of Hampton, Virginia, radio station WVEC—filed with the Federal Communications Commission (FCC) on July 14, 1952, for permission to build a new television station on ultra high frequency (UHF) channel 15. At the time, the Hampton Roads area only had one operating TV station: WTAR-TV (channel 4). A second very high frequency (VHF) channel, 10, had been assigned to the area, while on the UHF band channel 27 and 33 were also available for new stations. The FCC awarded the first two post-freeze permits for Hampton Roads television in February 1953, one to WVEC for channel 15 and another for channel 33 in Newport News. For television, WVEC announced it would expand its existing facilities in Hampton with a two-story addition.

The advent of a second television station in Hampton Roads triggered an affiliation shift. WTAR agreed to become an exclusive CBS affiliate for radio and television, and in June, NBC signed an affiliation agreement with WVEC-TV. The station began broadcasting a test pattern on the night of August 15 and continued to broadcast it for 12 hours a day.

At the time, not all television sets could receive UHF stations, and conversion of existing sets was necessary. WVEC's test pattern was intended to aid technicians converting sets, and there were many sets to convert. A joint study by WTAR and WVEC found that of all television homes in Hampton Roads, only 5.5% of them could receive UHF. Because of this situation, NBC provided substantial support to WVEC-TV's pre-launch promotion to drive conversions and advertiser support, which was referred to in the press as "Operation Norfolk". Jack Levy, writing in Variety, noted that "seldom, if ever, has a network gone to bat for a new affiliate as has NBC in launching WVEC-TV". Efforts included the resale of converter boxes and door-to-door sales. WVEC-TV began program service on September 19, 1953, with an inaugural program featuring NBC personalities Margaret Truman, Faye Emerson, and Skitch Henderson and utilizing NBC producers. Levy noted, "The result was an opening by a small local independent which would do credit to a large metropolitan station." Converter sales on the first day of telecasting caused some dealers to run out of stock. However, NBC allowed its coverage of the 1953 World Series to air on both WTAR-TV and WVEC-TV. Channel 15 became a basic NBC affiliate—a mandatory buy for sponsors—when it renewed its affiliation agreement in January 1954. By year's end, WVEC-TV was gaining in the ratings, had gone from losing money to turning a profit, and had just opened a studio in Norfolk. About 125,000 of the roughly 220,000 TV sets in Hampton Roads, or 56%, were UHF-converted.

In spite of the initial success, the picture began to change. Channel 10, which had been in the hearing stage, was awarded by the FCC in June 1956 to Portsmouth Radio Corporation, owner of WAVY. Variety openly speculated on whether NBC would move to WAVY-TV and whether WVEC-TV or WTOV-TV (channel 27) would be able to secure the ABC affiliation. As early as 1954, WTOV-TV was beginning efforts to move a third VHF channel to the Hampton Roads area. It filed with the FCC to move channel 13 from New Bern, North Carolina, but then Nathan Frank obtained a permit to use that channel. When the commission proposed to shift New Bern to channel 12 and allocate channel 13 to the Norfolk area, it indicated that any group would be able to apply for it—including WVEC-TV and WTOV-TV, which both expressed interest. The FCC all but finalized this action in June 1957. WVEC applied, specifying a site change to near Kempsville, necessary to maintain spacing to other channel 13 stations in Baltimore and Lynchburg. WTOV-TV, after being partially acquired by Norfolk radio station WNOR, applied for the channel. Also seeking channel 13 were two new groups. Virginian Television Corporation included the stockholders of radio station WBOF in Virginia Beach, while Norfolk–Newport News Television Corporation consisted of stockholders with radio interests in Florida, Georgia, and Kentucky. The latter group dropped out in March 1958 after failing to receive aviation approval for its tower site.

While the channel 13 fight was under way, WVEC-TV introduced new programming. In September 1957, channel 15 began broadcasting two hours a day of educational television programs for Norfolk city schools. An hour in the morning and another in the afternoon was devoted to experimental programs for viewing in elementary and secondary schools. The program was funded by a Ford Foundation grant; WVEC-TV offered the time in exchange for the cost of orthicon tubes used in TV cameras. In February 1958, the station added courses for college credit provided by the College of William & Mary. It also faced new competition. WAVY-TV began broadcasting as an ABC affiliate on channel 10 on September 1, 1957. The presence of a second VHF station hurt WVEC-TV's audience share. NBC found that WVEC-TV's audience share slipped from 16% to 7% between November 1955 and November 1957—while WAVY-TV had a 39% share. WAVY-TV became an NBC affiliate as well, and WVEC-TV waived rights to some programs in light of declining ratings. Station president Thomas P. Chisman told Warner Twyford of The Virginian-Pilot, "We live or die with channel 13." WVEC-TV also complained of harmonic interference from the operation of stations on channels 10 and 15 in the same area. A temporary shift to channel 21 was approved, but Chisman had no interest in a channel other than 13. In July 1958, the WVEC-TV staff of 32 agreed to a station-wide salary cut to help the station continue.

=== Move to channel 13 ===
On July 30, 1958, it was announced that Peninsula had agreed to merge its WVEC-TV application with those of WTOV and Virginian Television, which each would own 10 percent of the new channel 13, with WVEC radio being spun off. It appeared as though approval was assured until WAVY-TV protested at a hearing that Broadcasting reported "burst into flame", claiming the addition of a third local VHF station would cause it financial distress and that the involvement of WNOR and WBOF in the same application raised questions of a potentially illegal duopoly. In April 1959, FCC examiner J. D. Bond rendered an initial decision approving the combined channel 13 application. Final approval came on July 15, after WAVY withdrew its petition. Before the approval, WVEC-TV had acquired a building in the Atlantic City area of Norfolk, at Third and Woodis streets, for a new Norfolk studio. WVEC-TV began airing ABC programming on August 22, 1959. It moved to channel 13 at 5 p.m. on November 13, 1959—Friday the 13th—from the new Norfolk facility. With its move to channel 13, WVEC-TV became a full ABC affiliate and WAVY-TV a full NBC affiliate. It also gained reception in many fringe areas that had been unable to receive the UHF transmissions on channel 15. The switch to channel 13 brought with it a new local program: the children's show Bungles the Clown, hosted by Jerry Sandford, which ran from 1959 to 1973.

Educational programming for schools continued on the new channel 13 after the switch, though afternoon time was dropped and programs were aired in a block from 9 to 11:30 a.m. WVEC-TV announced in December 1960 that it would cease carrying educational programming beginning in June 1961. Three months later, in March 1961, an association of local school systems was formed, with proposals to use channel 15 instead of the locally reserved 21 as well as WVEC-TV's former tower from its channel 15 facility. Only two school systems emerged in favor of the project: those in Hampton and Norfolk, which formed the Hampton Roads Educational Television Association and applied for channel 15 on May 29, 1961. WHRO-TV began broadcasting on October 2, 1961, as Virginia's first noncommercial television station.

While WVEC-TV initially posted strong ratings and competed with WTAR and WAVY, it ran third for most of the years following the 1959 affiliation switch. In 1965, the station became the third to move its transmitter facility to Driver, where a 1,049-foot (320 m) tower was built. The WVEC radio stations, last known under Peninsula ownership as WVEC and WVHR-FM, were sold in 1978 to Larry Saunders and Dick Lamb and became WWDE AM and WWDE-FM.

=== Corinthian and Belo ownership ===
Peninsula Broadcasting Corporation agreed to sell WVEC-TV to Corinthian Broadcasting, the television stations division of Dun & Bradstreet, in 1979. The deal marked the end of 32 years of Chisman ownership in broadcasting dating back to the launch of WVEC radio in 1947. Under Corinthian, WVEC-TV experimented with a prime access magazine program, Tidewater Evening; the collaborative venture, involving all six Corinthian stations, was canceled after a year due to low ratings. When Dun & Bradstreet opted to sell Corinthian in 1983 to focus on its business information services, the division was acquired by the A. H. Belo Corporation of Dallas for $606 million. The Belo sale, which closed in February 1984, also marked the end of Chisman running WVEC-TV, as he became chairman.

WVEC continued to maintain the Hampton and Norfolk studio operations, in part because WVEC was required to originate the majority of its public affairs and news programming from Hampton because that was the city of license. However, there was no room for additional personnel in Hampton, and two-thirds of station staff worked from Norfolk. In 1983, WVEC filed to change its city of license to Norfolk, hoping to resolve what Chisman called an error. By the time the FCC relaxed rules on main studio locations in 1987, prompting the station to look at shifting its headquarters, 90 of 115 employees—more than three-quarters—were based in Norfolk.

=== Local News on Cable ===
WVEC-TV, The Virginian-Pilot, and Cox Communications entered into a collaboration to launch a local cable news service, known as Local News on Cable (LNC), in February 1997. LNC offered simulcasts and repeats of the latest WVEC-TV newscasts as well as two special collaborative programs. Pilot 13 News at 10 featured two anchors at the WVEC studio and a third at a set built at the newspaper's downtown Norfolk offices. The other dedicated Pilot 13 News newscast aired on weekend mornings. Previously, WVEC had produced a 10 p.m. newscast for the low-power station WPEN-LP. Offered on different channel numbers in different areas, it moved to channel 5 when WSKY-TV began broadcasting in 2001. Pilot 13 News struggled with competition from WVBT (channel 43), which debuted a 10 p.m. newscast in 1998; by November 2005, it had just over one-fourth of the viewership of WVBT's newscast. After ceasing to be a profitable endeavor, Pilot 13 News aired for the final time on January 30, 2009; Local News on Cable continued to air news repeats with a ticker of stories from the newspaper's website until it closed at the end of 2010 when the agreement between the parties expired.

=== Gannett/Tegna ownership ===
On June 13, 2013, the Gannett Company announced that it would acquire Belo. The sale was completed on December 23. On June 29, 2015, Gannett's broadcasting and digital divisions split from the newspaper division under the Tegna Inc. name.

On August 19, 2025, Nexstar Media Group announced it would acquire Tegna. In Hampton Roads, Nexstar already owned WAVY-TV and WVBT, the Fox affiliate. The deal was approved and completed on March 19, 2026. As part of the transaction, Nexstar committed to the divestiture of WAVY-TV within two years, along with five other stations, mostly in markets where the two companies combined held four TV station licenses.

== News operation ==
Tony Burden arrived at WVEC in 1968 and later described what he found as "sick". The station was the last in the market to present color newsfilm and was last place in the ratings. Chisman commissioned a survey as to the viability of presenting the evening news at 5:30 p.m. instead of 6 p.m. Though the survey recommended against it, Chisman started the newscast and slowly built a niche for WVEC in news that overperformed in demographics valuable with advertisers; by 1974, the early news ran second to a dominant WTAR-TV, while the late newscast placed third. Another impetus for improvement and expansion of the news operation was the 1973 survey by outgoing FCC commissioner Nicholas Johnson of local programming at network affiliates in the top 50 television markets, which put WVEC among the 10 worst stations in the country. The station responded by adding more equipment and staff. Burden, who served as evening anchor and news director, was arrested in December 1977 on drug charges. The story received a wide airing on competing newscasts and in the Norfolk newspapers co-owned with WTAR-TV by Landmark Communications.

Burden resigned in 1978 and was replaced as main anchor by Jim Kincaid, a Peabody Award–winning former correspondent for ABC News. Kincaid became known for his personal commentaries to close newscasts, which were compiled into a book, Notes from My Friends, and remained with the station until retiring in 1996. WVEC went to an hour-long evening newscast in 1980, the market's first since WAVY-TV tried the idea for six months in the mid-1970s. The changes came at a time of turmoil for channel 3, which as late as 1980 held an 18-percentage point lead over WVEC at 6 p.m. However, after the acquisition of WTAR-TV by Knight Ridder and its renaming to WTKR, its ratings declined. By 1985, WTKR was in second place in the time slot behind either WAVY or WVEC, depending on the ratings survey. By the late 1980s, WVEC had the leading 6 p.m. newscast in Hampton Roads and WAVY the most-watched 11 p.m. newscast, a situation that persisted into 1990. To try and improve the 11 p.m. news ratings, news director Tony Ballew—who came to the station in 1989—shuffled the anchor lineup and paired Kincaid with a new co-anchor, Barbara Ciara, who had previously worked at WAVY. By November 1992, WVEC led or tied at 5:30, 6, and 11 p.m. During this period, WVEC also launched a morning newscast in 1990, the third local station to do so.

Another well-known news anchor for WVEC-TV was Terry Zahn, who was hired from WAVY-TV in 1993 and joined the news staff in 1994. Zahn was teamed with Ciara on the early news, which was moved from 5:30 to 5 p.m. and debuted in first place in the time slot. When Kincaid retired in 1996, Zahn took his place on the 6 p.m. news, anchoring for a time at 5, 6, and 11 p.m. After a battle with multiple myeloma in 1997, the cancer went into remission; it returned, and Zahn died in January 2000. Ciara departed later that year to work at WTKR.

In the early 2000s, WVEC was the second-rated station to WAVY-TV in evening news but slowly gained on channel 10. It introduced a 5:30 p.m. newscast in September 2001, bringing the station to a 90-minute news block from 5 to 6:30 and providing WAVY and WTKR competition in the time slot. The move raised the ratings for the entire evening news block; WVEC claimed its first win at 6 p.m. in six years in November 2004, and by 2005 the block had a lead of several rating points over WAVY. The pattern of strong performances in the early evening and second- or third-place finishes in other dayparts for the most part continued, though WAVY occasionally led instead.

In 2013, WVEC rebranded as 13 News Now, at a time when its ratings were increasing. In November 2013, the station was first place in early evening news and tied with WTKR at 11 p.m.

=== Notable former on-air staff ===
- Sharyn Alfonsi – reporter, –1997
- Natasha Barrett – reporter, 2003–2006
- Marcia Bartusiak – WVEC's first female reporter, 1971–1975
- Jim Kincaid – anchor, 1978–1996
- John Miller – news anchor and news director (1971–1983), morning and noon anchor (1990–1996)
- Hank Plante – reporter
- Robyne Robinson – reporter, 1985
- Stan Verrett — sportscaster, 1990s
- G. William Whitehurst — political analyst, late 1980s
- Terry Zahn – anchor, 1994–2000

== Technical information ==
WVEC's transmitter is located near Driver in Suffolk. The station's signal is multiplexed:

Subchannels of WVEC
Subchannel	Res.	Short name	Programming
13.1	720p	WVEC-HD	ABC
13.2	480i	Crime	True Crime Network
13.3	480i	MeTV	MeTV
13.4	480i	Quest	Quest
13.5	480i	365 NET	365BLK
13.6	480i	OUTLAW	Outlaw
13.7	480i	WX 24X7	Weather
13.8	480i	ShopLC	Shop LC

WVEC began broadcasting a digital signal on channel 41 on April 3, 2002. It ended programming on its analog signal, over VHF channel 13, on June 12, 2009, as part of the digital television transition. The station's digital signal relocated from its pre-transition UHF channel 41 to VHF channel 13, where it remained until moving to channel 11 on May 1, 2020, as a result of the 2016 United States wireless spectrum auction.

In 2022, WVEC petitioned the FCC to let it move to the UHF band on channel 35. It cited signal reception difficulties related to its VHF facility, which increased after the repack. To eliminate concerns over adjacent-channel interference, Tegna acquired WYSJ-CD and proposed to move it to the same tower. The commission approved the change on March 16, 2023, and the station switched to UHF broadcasting on October 29, 2024.

=== Eastern Shore translators ===
On the Eastern Shore of Virginia, Accomack County owns two translators, W18EG-D and W25AA-D (licensed to Onancock and broadcast from Mappsville), that provide the main channel of WVEC alongside those of WTKR, WAVY-TV, and WHRO-TV.
