= Lockwood Broadcast Group =

American television broadcast company

- Industry: Media
- Founded: 1994; 32 years ago
- Headquarters: Richmond, Virginia, United States
- Products: Television

Lockwood Broadcast Group is a television broadcasting company that owns stations in several markets. The company's main offices are located in Richmond, Virginia, with operational headquarters in Hampton, Virginia.

== History ==
Lockwood Broadcast began its operations in 1994 by upstarting television station WPEN-LP until the run ended in April 2002. In September 1996, Lockwood purchased religious independent station WLYJ-TV (now WVFX) then sold it to Davis Television in 1998. In April 1997, Lockwood acquired another religious independent station WJCB-TV (now WPXV-TV) before it was purchased by Paxson Communications in December of the same year and July 1997, Lockwood bought then-The WB affiliate WAWB from Bell Broadcasting for $10 million, changing the call letters to WUPV and became an UPN affiliate until joining the CW on September 18, 2006 and the selling of the station to Southeastern Media Holdings (now American Spirit Media and operated by Raycom Media through a shared services agreement (SSA)) for $47 million in August 2006. In 1998, Lockwood purchased ABC affiliate KTEN became exclusively an NBC affiliate after the acquisition of the station and brought UPN affiliate WHDF in May 2004 for $5.5 million.

On January 24, 2006, the UPN and WB networks announced that they would merge into a new network called The CW Television Network. On April 4, 2006, Lockwood announced that they have signed affiliation deals with The CW to become affiliates of the newly combined network.

Longtime owner Commonwealth Broadcasting put up CW affiliate WQCW for sale on January 20, 2007. Lockwood Broadcast acquired the station for $5.25 million. The deal closed on May 21 of that year.

In February 2011, ACME Communications announced a deal to sell WBXX-TV to Lockwood for $5.6 million. The FCC approved the sale on March 21 and the deal closed on May 6.

On November 13, 2012, Lockwood Broadcast Group entered into an agreement to purchase Daystar affiliate WMAK from Word of God Fellowship for $2.95 million while at the same filed an application with the Federal Communications Commission to change the station's call letters to WKNX-TV. The FCC approved the sale on December 21. On February 25, 2013, Lockwood took control of the station, which converted to an independent television station with general entertainment programming format its branding was also changed to "WKNX, The Knox", although the station did not formally change its callsign until March 19. Formal consummation of the Lockwood purchase occurred on March 4, 2013, creating the Knoxville television market's first station duopoly with CW affiliate WBXX-TV.

On April 1, 2013, Lockwood would be acquiring CW affiliate WCWG from Titan Broadcasting for $2.75 million. The sale was consummated on September 23.

On July 15, 2013, Lockwood announced that they will seek a 51% stake in WSKY-TV, a full-power independent television station currently owned by Sky Television, LLC for $1.105 million. The sale was finalized on November 25.

On November 15, 2013, Lockwood announced that it would sell WQCW to Excalibur Broadcasting for $5.5 million. Upon the completion of the purchase, WQCW will begin a shared services agreement with Gray Television, owner of NBC affiliate WSAZ-TV. Excalibur's president Don Ray was a former general manager at WSAZ. However, in February 2014, this deal was abandoned in favor of selling WQCW and WOCW to Gray outright for that same $5.5 million; Gray noted in the updated filing with the FCC that WQCW is not among the four highest-rated stations in the Charleston – Huntington market and that there would still be eight unique station owners upon the completion of the WQCW purchase, and in a statement said that "it made more sense to own the stations outright." In the interim, Gray took over WQCW and WOCW through a local marketing agreement on February 1. The sale was completed on April 1.

On October 1, 2015, Gray announced that it would sell KAKE-TV in Wichita, Kansas to Lockwood in return for WBXX-TV and $11.2 million.

On July 15, 2018, Lockwood agreed to sell WHDF to Nexstar Media Group; Nexstar concurrently took over the station's operations through a time brokerage agreement. The deal was completed on November 9.

On August 20, 2018, Gray Television announced that it would sell four Fox affiliates — WTNZ in Knoxville; WFXG in Augusta, Georgia; WPGX in Panama City, Florida; and WDFX-TV in Dothan, Alabama; to Lockwood. The deal is part of Gray's acquisition of Raycom Media, the owner of all four stations. The sale was completed on January 2, 2019.

== Current stations ==
Media market	State	Station	Channel	Acquired	Current affiliation(s)	Notes
Dothan	Alabama	WDFX-TV	34	2019	Fox	
Panama City	Florida	WPGX	28	2019	Fox	
Augusta	Georgia	WFXG	54	2019	Fox	
Colby	Kansas	KLBY	4	2016	ABC	(Note: Satellite of KAKE.)
Garden City	Kansas	KUPK	13	2016	ABC	
Wichita	Kansas	KAKE	10	2016	ABC	
Knoxville	Tennessee	WKNX-TV	7	2013	Independent	
Knoxville	Tennessee	WTNZ	43	2019	Fox	
Sherman	Texas	KTEN	10	1998	NBC; The CW (DT2); ABC (DT3)	
Charlottesville	Virginia	WVAW-LD	16	2019	ABC	
Charlottesville	Virginia	WCAV	19	2019	CBS; Fox (DT2)	
Norfolk	Virginia	WSKY-TV	4	2013	Independent	

== Former stations ==
Media market	State	Station	Channel	Acquired	Sold
Huntsville	Alabama	WHDF	15	2004	2018
Greensboro	North Carolina	WCWG	20	2013	2018
Knoxville	Tennessee	WBXX-TV	20	2011	2016
Norfolk	Virginia	WJCB-TV	49	1997	1997
Norfolk	Virginia	WPEN-LP	68	1994	2002
Richmond	Virginia	WUPV	65	1997	2006
Clarksburg	West Virginia	WLYJ-TV	10	1996	1998
Huntington–Charleston	West Virginia	WQCW	30	2007	2014
