= WFXG =

Television station in Augusta, Georgia, United States

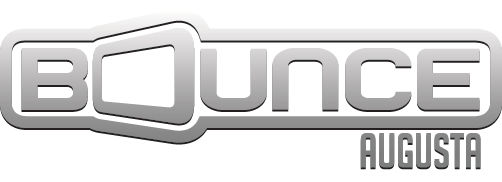
- Augusta, Georgia; United States
- Channels: Digital: 36 (UHF); Virtual: 54
- Branding: WFXG Fox 54; Fox 54 News

Programming
- Affiliations: 54.1: Fox; for others, see § Subchannels

Ownership
- Owner: Lockwood Broadcast Group; (Augusta TV, LLC)

History
- Founded: October 31, 1989
- First air date: May 23, 1991
- Former channel numbers: Analog: 54 (UHF, 1991–2009); Digital: 51 (UHF, 2001–2016), 31 (UHF, 2016–2019)
- Call sign meaning: Fox Georgia

Technical information
- Licensing authority: FCC
- Facility ID: 3228
- ERP: 373 kW
- HAAT: 380 m (1,247 ft)
- Transmitter coordinates: 33°25′1″N 81°50′5″W

Links
- Public license information: Public file; LMS
- Website: www.wfxg.com

WFXG (channel 54) is a television station in Augusta, Georgia, United States, affiliated with the Fox network and owned by Lockwood Broadcast Group. The station's studios are located on Washington Road/GA 104 in the Lamkin section of Martinez (with an Augusta mailing address), and its transmitter is located in Beech Island, South Carolina's Spiderweb section.

== History ==
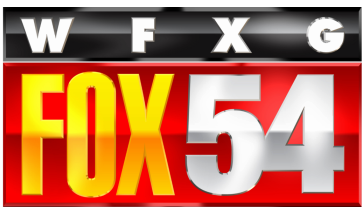
WFXG's logo until 2016

In July 1983, nine applications for a new TV station on channel 54 were received by the Federal Communications Commission (FCC). Augusta 54, LP was given approval in October 1989. The construction permit was sold to John Pezold (then owner of Columbus-based WXTX) in 1990. The station eventually signed-on in May 1991, and immediately picked up an affiliation with Fox.

It was Augusta's first full-power commercial station not aligned with a Big Three network, as well as the first full-power commercial station in Augusta since WATU (channel 26, later WAGT, now defunct) returned to the air in 1974. Prior to the sign-on of WFXG, Fox was previously seen on low-powered W67BE (now NBC affiliate WAGT-CD). The station was owned by Augusta Family Broadcasting, Inc. For the 1993 and 1994 season, WFXG was also affiliated with the Prime Time Entertainment Network. Retlaw Broadcasting, a company owned by the heirs of Walt Disney, purchased the station in May 1998. Fisher Communications purchased WFXG along with the other Retlaw owned stations in 1999. WFXG and WXTX became Fisher's only properties east of the Rocky Mountains.

Fisher, based in Seattle, decided to concentrate on its broadcast properties in the Pacific Northwest and California. WFXG and Columbus based WXTX (also on channel 54) were sold to the Atlanta-based Galleria Broadcast Group, L.P. which purchased the two stations for $40.1 million. In December 2003, Community Newspaper Holdings acquired WFXG and WXTX as well as WSFX-TV in Wilmington, North Carolina) through its Southeastern Media Holdings subsidiary. Community planned on selling all four of its television stations to Thomas Henson in January 2011.

Henson, upon approval from the FCC, would then operate all four properties under a company called Southeastern Media Acquisitions. When contacted about the proposed deal, WFXG's General Manager Barry Barth stated he could not confirm the specifics of the transaction but said the request was basically a licensing switch and would not affect the station's day-to-day operations. The deal was consummated April 5, 2011. During the next month, Henson folded the Southeastern Media Acquisition stations into American Spirit Media, LLC (one of his other companies) with the merger being finalized on May 25.

At that time, Raycom exercised its option to purchase WFXG outright from American Spirit Media through a newly created indirect subsidiary. Essentially, the station would be directly owned and operated by the company as opposed through a managing agreement. Raycom's acquisition of the station was completed on August 31. WFXG recently added coverage of ACC football and basketball games as well as periodic airings of certain sporting events from Raycom Sports. WFXG turned-off its analog transmitter on February 17, 2009, in compliance with the DTV transition. It had plans to relocate its digital signal from channel 51 to channel 31 (formerly WRDW-DT) after the transition but ultimately remained on channel 51. Finally on August 1, 2016, WFXG moved to channel 31 and increased its power output back to 413 kW ERP.

Gray Television announced its acquisition of Raycom Media on June 25, 2018; Gray immediately put WFXG on the market, as it already owned WRDW-TV (channel 12). On August 20, 2018, Gray announced that WFXG, along with fellow Fox affiliates WTNZ in Knoxville, Tennessee, WPGX in Panama City, Florida, and WDFX-TV in Dothan, Alabama, would be sold to Lockwood Broadcast Group. The sale was approved on December 20. The sale was completed on January 2, 2019.

== News operation ==
After ABC affiliate WJBF, channel 6 (owned by Media General) renovated its studios in 2003, the station entered into a news share agreement with WFXG. The outsourcing arrangement resulted in a nightly prime time newscast to debut on this station. Known as Fox 54 News at 10, the thirty-minute program originated from WJBF's facility on Reynolds Street in Downtown Augusta. The broadcast featured different on-air graphics and modified WJBF's existing set with separate duratrans in order to conceal that station's logo. The principal look of the set and on-air graphics for Fox 54 News at 10 remained the same since the newscast's launch and the program always used Gari Media Group's "The X Package" as its music theme.

Meanwhile, NBC affiliate WAGT decided to establish its own weeknight prime time newscast at 10 in 2004 to go up against this station's effort. The production launched a few days after WFXG's show and was initially seen on independent outlet WBEK-CA (now WAGT-CD) through a similar arrangement. Known as WBEK 16 News at 10, the program was soon canceled due to low ratings and inconsistent viewership. The broadcast was unable to directly compete against WFXG's news because this program has been very successful in the time slot from its start. After being retooled, WAGT's weeknight prime time newscast was relaunched on cable-only WB affiliate "WBAU" and was known as WB 23 News at 10.

In July 2011, WFXG announced that it would launch an in-house news operation by October, which was to be produced in collaboration with other Raycom stations to give it a "regional" feel. In partnership with sister outlet WTOC-TV in Savannah, WFXG hired multimedia journalists to shoot, edit, and report coverage in the Augusta area. Five personalities joined the station and worked out of Augusta. All anchors for news and weather were provided by WTOC and the broadcast originated live from that station's facility on Chatham Center Drive in Savannah's Chatham Parkway section.

WFXG also previously featured unique, regionalized coverage provided by Raycom Media sister outlets including WTOC, WIS in Columbia and WCSC-TV in Charleston. The partnership was comparable to the existing "Raycom News Network", another regional network among the company's widespread group of television stations in the state of Alabama (WSFA in Montgomery, WDFX-TV in Dothan, WAFF in Huntsville, WBRC in Birmingham and WTVM/WXTX in Phenix City–Auburn–Opelika). The six stations shared information, equipment (such as satellite trucks) and stories from reporters. WFXG became the third Fox affiliate in Raycom's portfolio to have its newscasts produced in-house joining Birmingham's WBRC and Cincinnati's WXIX. Local newscasts on the remainder of the company's Fox outlets were produced through news share agreements by a big three network affiliate in the respective market.

With the change, WFXG upgraded its newscasts to full high definition level becoming the second station in Augusta to do so (CBS affiliate WRDW-TV was the first). At that point, according to local program listings, Fox 54 News at 10 was expanded to an hour on weeknights and Sundays; the program continued to air for a half-hour on Saturday evenings. There was no regularly scheduled sports report featured during the broadcast.

In July 2016, WFXG announced plans to expand its news programming and launch a 3 1/2-hour weekday morning newscast from 5:30 to 9 a.m. Remodeling to expand the studio building in Martinez to allow production of in-studio segments began later that month. Even after the program, titled Fox 54 Morning News Now, launched on February 6, 2017, WTOC continued to produce in-studio news and weather segments for the 10 p.m. newscast in the interim until WFXG hired anchors and meteorologists to helm the broadcast at its Washington Road facility. By 2019, WFXG had added locally produced news at 6:30 p.m., 10–11:30 p.m. and the market's only four-hour morning newscast from 5 to 9 a.m.

== Subchannels ==
The station's signal is multiplexed:

Subchannels of WFXG
Subchannel	Res.	Short name	Programming
54.1	720p	WFXG-DT	Fox
54.2	480i	WFXG-BN	Bounce TV
54.3	480i	WFXG-GT	Grit
54.4	480i	WFXG-CT	Court TV
