= WPGX =

Television station in Panama City, Florida

- Panama City, Florida; United States
- Channels: Digital: 9 (VHF); Virtual: 28
- Branding: Fox 28; Bounce Panama City (28.2)

Programming
- Affiliations: 28.1: Fox; for others, see § Subchannels

Ownership
- Owner: Lockwood Broadcast Group; (Panama City TV, LLC)
- Sister stations: WDFX-TV

History
- Founded: January 23, 1986
- First air date: May 21, 1988
- Former channel numbers: Analog: 28 (UHF, 1988–2009)
- Former affiliations: Independent (1988–1989)

Technical information
- Licensing authority: FCC
- Facility ID: 2942
- ERP: 24.1 kW
- HAAT: 217 m (712 ft)
- Transmitter coordinates: 30°23′42″N 85°32′2″W

Links
- Public license information: Public file; LMS
- Website: www.wpgxfox28.com

WPGX (channel 28) is a television station in Panama City, Florida, United States, affiliated with the Fox network. The station is owned by Lockwood Broadcast Group, and maintains transmitter facilities on Blue Springs Road in unincorporated Youngstown, Bay County. Its studios are located on West 23rd Street/SR 368 in Panama City, though most of its on-air master control operations originate from Gray Media's WBRC in Birmingham, Alabama, its former sister Fox affiliate until the start of 2019.

== History ==
The station, founded by Family Group Broadcasting of Tampa, was first announced in August 1987, and slated to launch in either December or January. It would launch on May 21, 1988, airing an analog signal on UHF channel 28. For a year it operated as an independent, airing syndicated general-audience programs, religious programming, and sports. Despite initial disinterest in an affiliation, it was announced that the station had signed on to the new Fox network on May 2, 1989, and would begin airing its programming four days later.

The station would be sold to the New York–based Ashling Broadcasting Group on April 30, 1990. Ashling would sell the station to Wicks Broadcasting Group in January 1997, who would sell it again to Waitt Media for $7.1 million in October 1998. Waitt would sell WPGX to Raycom Media in December 2003. At one point under Raycom ownership, WPGX maintained its Panama City facilities on Luverne Avenue, in a building (known as the "Fox Television Center") shared with a SunTrust Bank branch. In May 2010, it relaunched its website for the first time under Raycom's control, featuring limited station-related content, including FCC public file and EEO disclosures, and mainly serving as an advertorial web address with various promotions from Panama City businesses.

Atlanta-based Gray Television announced its acquisition of Raycom on June 25, 2018; Gray immediately put WPGX on the market, as it already owned WJHG-TV (channel 7). On August 20, 2018, Gray announced that WPGX, along with fellow Fox affiliates WTNZ in Knoxville, Tennessee, WFXG in Augusta, Georgia, and WDFX-TV in Dothan, Alabama, would be sold to Lockwood Broadcast Group. The sale was completed on January 2, 2019.

== News operation ==
At one time in the 1990s, WJHG produced a 9 p.m. newscast for WPGX. This was very short-lived, and Panama City was one of the few places in the country (and a very select group of Fox affiliates) not to have a prime time newscast of any kind.

In January 2010, local ABC outlet WMBB (then owned by Hoak Media) began producing local weather cut-ins for this station (recorded in advance) through an arrangement. Although there was speculation this agreement would eventually be expanded into a prime time newscast at 9, these plans never came to fruition at the time. The weather segments ceased airing at some point and this Fox affiliate resumed taped weather forecasts produced by WeatherVision, which had produced them before the arrangement with WMBB was made.

On June 1, 2020, WPGX debuted an hour-long weeknight 9 p.m. newscast produced by WMBB, titled Fox 28 News at 9:00. This happened alongside fellow sister station WDFX in Dothan terminating their existing arrangement with former sister station WSFA. Like in Panama City, Lockwood contracted with Nexstar-owned WDHN to produce a locally-based 9 p.m. newscast in Dothan. The 9 p.m. newscast ended on both WPGX and WDFX effective June 1, 2025.

== Technical information ==
=== Subchannels ===
The station's signal is multiplexed:

Subchannels of WPGX
Subchannel	Res.	Short name	Programming
28.1	720p	WPGX-DT	Fox
28.2	480i	WPGX-BN	Bounce TV
28.3	480i	WPGX-GT	Grit
28.4	480i	WPGX-CT	Court TV

WPGX-DT2 was a charter affiliate of The Tube Music Network before its ended operations in October 2007. The subchannel was relaunched in 2013 to carry Bounce TV, with Grit joining WPGX on its third subchannel in September 2014 and Court TV joining WPGX on its fourth subchannel in May 2019.

=== Analog-to-digital conversion ===
WPGX shut down its analog signal, over UHF channel 28, on June 12, 2009, the official date on which full-power television stations in the United States transitioned from analog to digital broadcasts under federal mandate. The station's digital signal remained on its pre-transition VHF channel 9, using virtual channel 28.
