= WDFX-TV =

Television station in Ozark, Alabama

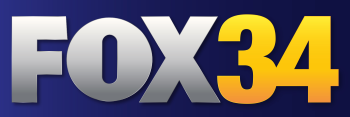
- Ozark–Dothan, Alabama; United States
- City: Ozark, Alabama
- Channels: Digital: 33 (UHF); Virtual: 34
- Branding: Fox 34; Bounce Wiregrass (34.2)

Programming
- Affiliations: 34.1: Fox; for others, see § Subchannels

Ownership
- Owner: Lockwood Broadcast Group; (Dothan TV, LLC)
- Sister stations: WPGX

History
- Founded: February 26, 1988
- First air date: February 15, 1991
- Former call signs: WSDW (1988–1989); WDAU (1991–1995)
- Former channel numbers: Analog: 34 (UHF, 1991–2009)
- Call sign meaning: We're Dothan's Fox

Technical information
- Licensing authority: FCC
- Facility ID: 32851
- ERP: 538 kW
- HAAT: 148 m (486 ft)
- Transmitter coordinates: 31°12′29.7″N 85°36′49.4″W

Links
- Public license information: Public file; LMS
- Website: www.wdfxfox34.com

WDFX-TV (channel 34) is a television station licensed to Ozark, Alabama, United States, serving as the Fox affiliate for the Dothan area. Owned by Lockwood Broadcast Group, the station has studios on Ross Clark Circle (AL 210/US 231) in Dothan, and its transmitter is located in unincorporated Wicksburg.

== History ==
The station launched as WDAU in February 1991. Airing an analog signal on UHF channel 34, it was the market's fourth television outlet to sign-on and has been with Fox since the very beginning. It was established after a small group of Ozark investors saw the market as being underserved with the network and the need for a locally based affiliate in the area; prior to the station's sign-on, Fox programming was limited to the extreme northern fringe of the Dothan market, which was served by WCOV-TV from Montgomery. The call sign had been previously used on what is now CBS affiliate WYOU in Scranton–Wilkes-Barre, Pennsylvania (a sister station to rival ABC affiliate WDHN in Dothan).

The call letters changed to WDFX-TV on August 31, 1995, while owned by David Woods' Woods Communications Corporation of Montgomery. His father, Charles Woods, had operated rival CBS affiliate WTVY (channel 4) in Dothan. WDFX quickly grew in popularity under Woods Communications Corporation.

In June 1999, the station was bought by Waitt Media and, under the company's ownership, moved to its current facility on Ross Clark Circle. This change resulted in its advertising sales and traffic departments being held together under the same room for the first time. On December 15, 2003, Raycom Media bought the station; two years later, WDFX became a sister station to NBC affiliate WSFA in Montgomery after Raycom acquired the Liberty Corporation. The big three outlet served the Wiregrass Region as its de facto NBC affiliate until WRGX-LD signed on in 2013.

Gray Television announced its acquisition of Raycom on June 25, 2018; Gray immediately put WDFX-TV on the market, as it already owned WTVY. On August 20, 2018, Gray announced that WDFX, along with fellow Fox affiliates WTNZ in Knoxville, Tennessee, WFXG in Augusta, Georgia, and WPGX in Panama City, Florida, would be sold to Lockwood Broadcast Group. The sale was completed on January 2, 2019.

== News operation ==
On January 7, 2008, WDFX began airing a nightly prime time newscast at 9 produced by WSFA in Montgomery. Originally airing for 35 minutes on weeknights, a weekend half-hour edition of Fox News at 9 began in Summer 2008. It was produced in conjunction with Montgomery's Fox outlet WCOV through a news share agreement. The show originated from a secondary set at WSFA's studios on East Delano Avenue; likewise there was a primary focus in coverage of the Montgomery area. However, there were also localized news and sports contributions from two personalities based at WDFX's facility in Dothan (known on-air as the "Wiregrass Newsroom").

Although WSFA upgraded its local newscasts and primary set to high definition level on August 3, 2008, Fox News at 9 on WDFX and WCOV was not initially included in the change. It would not be until Spring 2010 that the prime time show would make the switch complete with an updated graphics package separate from local news programs seen on WSFA. After WCOV's outsourcing contract with WSFA expired at the end of 2010, the former entered into a new agreement with another Montgomery big three affiliated station in order to specifically cover the Montgomery area.

As a result, WSFA transitioned its nightly prime time show (renamed The News at Nine) to its second digital subchannel (then affiliated with the Retro Television Network; now with Bounce TV) on January 1, 2011. The show's format remained mostly unchanged except for originating from WSFA's primary set. Eventually, at some point in time, WSFA added a simulcast of its weekday afternoon newscast at 4 to WDFX's schedule. This sixty-minute broadcast, however, generally covers the greater Montgomery area. On September 10, 2012, WDFX began having competition to its prime time news at 9 with the introduction of a weeknight-only half-hour show on CW affiliate WTVY-DT3, which has since been canceled.

On June 1, 2020, a new locally based newscast replaced the WSFA-produced program. This newscast was produced by WDHN at their facility in Webb. A similar arrangement was made in Panama City where Lockwood contracted with WMBB to produce a 9 p.m. newscast for WPGX. Nexstar owns both WMBB and WDHN, which are also both ABC affiliates. The 9 p.m. newscasts on both WDFX and WPGX ended on June 1, 2025.

== Subchannels ==
The station's signal is multiplexed:

Subchannels of WDFX-TV
Channel	Res.	Short name	Programming
34.1	720p	WDFX-D	Fox
34.2	480i	Bounce	Bounce TV
34.3	480i	Grit TV	Grit
34.4	480i	Court	Court TV
