= Sharp's Ridge =

Geologic feature in Knoxville, Tennessee

Coordinates: 36°0′12″N 83°56′33″W

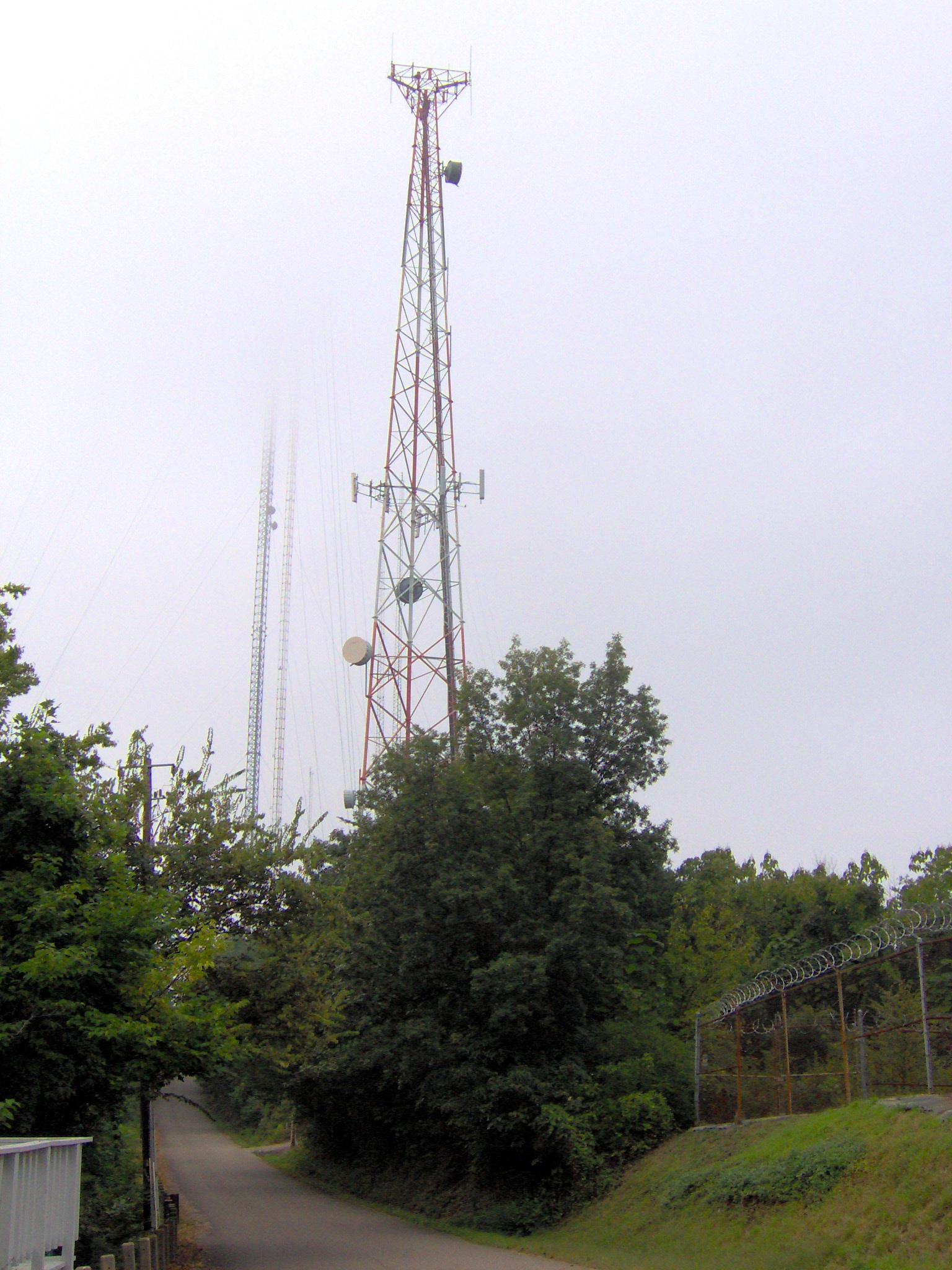
Radio towers atop Sharp's Ridge

Sharp's Ridge is a steep ridge in Knoxville, Tennessee, north of the city's downtown. A 111-acre (45 ha) area of the 7-mile (11 km) ridge is maintained as Sharp's Ridge Memorial Park, a city park dedicated to the honor of the area's war veterans. The ridge also is the site of a transmitting antenna farm that serves most of Knoxville's broadcasters. The highest ground point on the ridge is an abandoned fire tower located at 1,391 feet (424 m) above mean sea level. The ridge itself averages 200 to 300 feet (40 to 60 m) above the surrounding valley floor, allowing panoramic views of the Great Smoky Mountains and adjacent ranges to the east and the Cumberland Plateau and Cumberland Mountains to the west.

Sharp's Ridge is named for the Sharpe family, who lived on the ridge during the 19th century.

== Geography ==
Sharp's Ridge (spelled "Sharp Ridge" on United States Geological Survey (USGS) topographical maps) is a narrow, elongate ridge characteristic of the Ridge-and-Valley Appalachians. It is held up by steeply dipping sandstones and siltstones of the Cambrian Rome Formation . The Saltville Fault is mapped along the northwest slope, and less resistant shales and limestones of the Cambrian Conasauga Group, also steeply dipping, underlie the valleys to the northwest and southeast. The ridge stretches northeastward for approximately 7 miles (11 km) from Third Creek (near Knoxville's West Haven suburb) to Love Creek (at Mill Road, near the Oak Grove community). Beyond Love Creek, the ridge formation continues northeastward as McAnnally Ridge. The southern fringes of the Inskip and Fountain City suburbs, Christenberry Heights, and Beverly are located along the northern base of the ridge. The Lonsdale, Lincoln Park, and Whittle Springs neighborhoods of North Knoxville are located along the ridge's southern base.

First Creek and Second Creek, both southward-flowing tributaries of the Tennessee River, carve water gaps through Sharp's Ridge, effectively splitting the ridge into three sections. The First Creek water gap is traversed by Broadway (part of U.S. Route 441), and the Second Creek water gap is traversed by I-275. Interstate 640 runs parallel to the northern base of the ridge. The ridge's middle section, between the First Creek and Second Creek gaps, is the highest and most prominent section, and is the location of Sharp's Ridge Memorial Park and the antenna farm.

== Sharp's Ridge Memorial Park ==
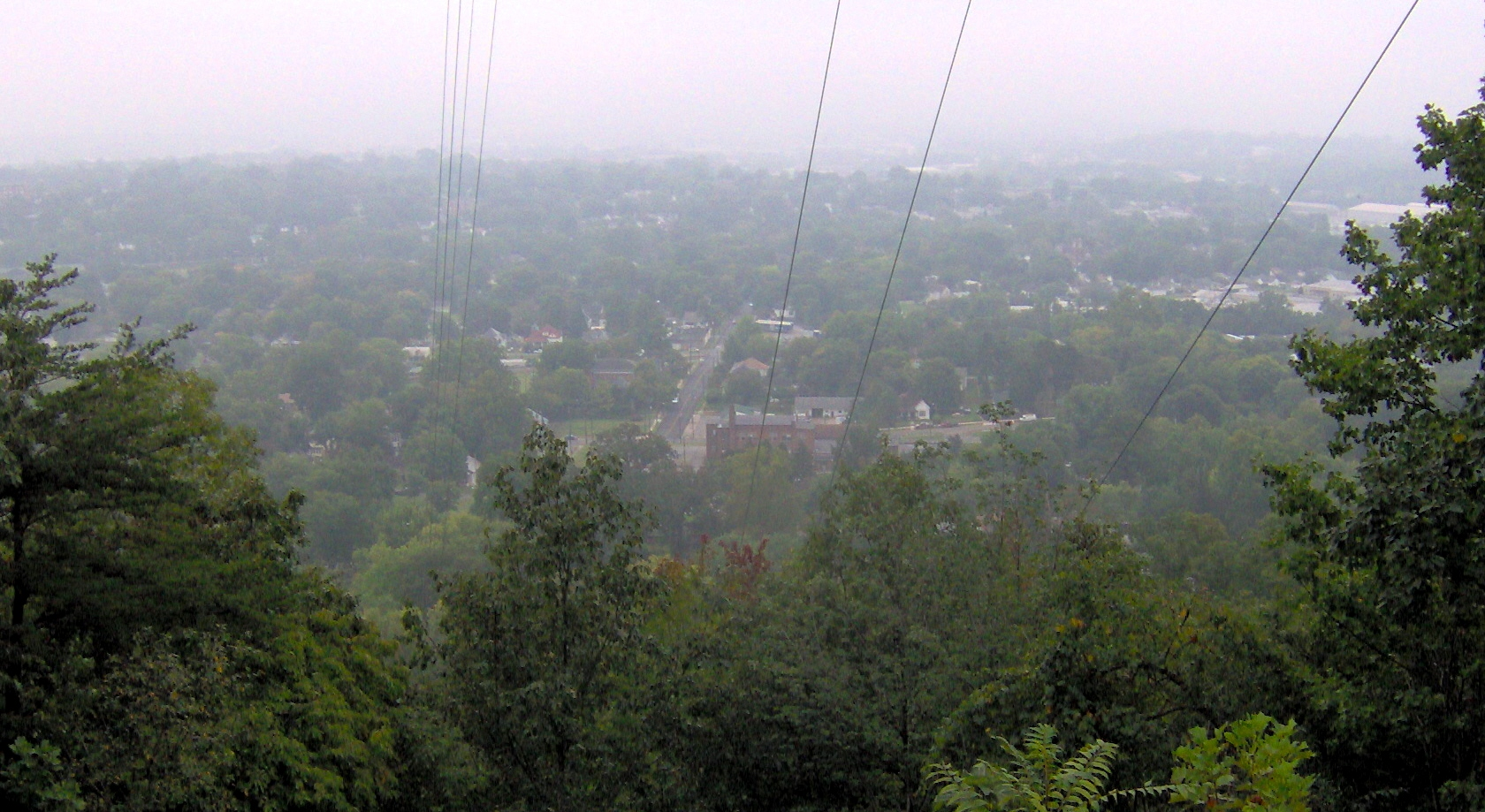
North Knoxville viewed from Sharp's Ridge Memorial Park

Sharp's Ridge Memorial Park consists of 111 acres (45 ha) along the ridge crest and southern face of the center of Sharp's Ridge. The park is accessible by Sharp's Ridge Road, just off Broadway. The park's location on a prominent ridgetop oriented parallel to the flight path of migrating birds makes it a top birdwatching destination in springtime. It is used by the Knoxville chapter of the Tennessee Ornithological Society for birdwatching activities. The park also has picnic facilities and several short walking trails.

Visible from Sharp's Ridge on clear days to the south is an excellent panorama of the Great Smoky Mountains-State Line Ridge, then further northeast up the High Unaka Mountains (namely the Bald Mountains) with Camp Creek Bald in Greene County, Tennessee being the northernmost visible peak, to the Southern Unaka Mountains (namely the Unicoi Mountains) with Starr Mountain near Etowah, Tennessee the southernmost visible peak. These faraway peaks are verifiable through the location of Tennessee Valley Authority (TVA) microwave dishes, which are aimed at relay towers on those faraway peaks. Most of the Tennessee side of the state line ridge is part of the Cherokee National Forest, the exception being the Great Smokies, which are part of the Great Smoky Mountains National Park.

To the north of Sharp's Ridge on clear days is another excellent panorama, this one of the Cumberland Escarpment, the edge of the Cumberland Plateau that stretches from Sand Mountain in Alabama northeastward into Kentucky. Local peaks clearly visible from Sharp's Ridge include Hinch Mountain near Crossville to the Southwest, Frozen Head above Petros, Flag Pole Mountain (part of Cross Mountain) above Rocky Top, northward to Point Peak above Cumberland Gap. AT&T microwave dishes aimed at those peaks verify their locations from Sharp's Ridge.

== Communications hub ==
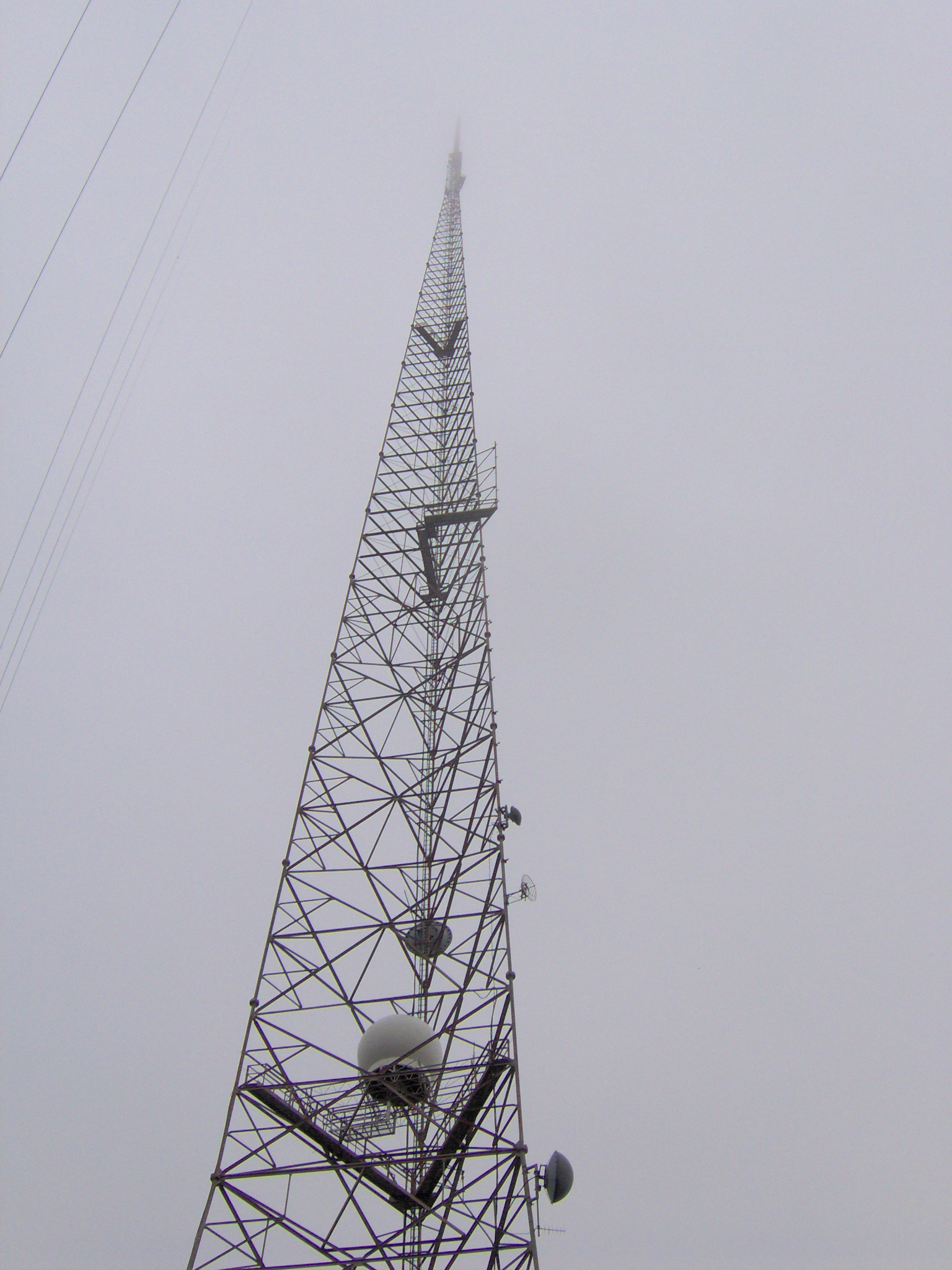
Former TV tower along Sharp's Ridge Road

Sharp's Ridge is the transmitting antenna farm for eleven of Knoxville's twelve analog and digital television stations, all of which broadcast from very noticeable towers in an antenna farm along the ridge.

The tallest tower is licensed by the Federal Communications Commission (FCC) as "Nexstar Tower Knoxville," and was built by Spectracite Towers, Inc. It is 1,456 feet tall. The structure is now owned by the American Tower Corporation, which leases it to PSIP WATE-TV Channel 6 broadcasting its over-the-air signal from this tower. The station operates WATE-DT digital Channel 26 also on this tower). Also located on this tower is the transmission antenna for WTNZ PSIP Channel 43.

The second tallest tower is the former "Richland Towers Tower Lonsdale." It is 1,352 feet (412 m) tall, with a candelabra antenna platform at the top. It is now owned by the American Tower Corporation, which leases it to WVLT-TV PSIP Channel 8, (which operates WVLT-DT on digital Channel 30), and WKOP-TV PSIP Channel 15 (which operates its WKOP-DT digital Channel 17) Their antennas all broadcast from the candelabra array at the top. The "Lonsdale" reference in the license, refers to the Knoxville neighborhood in the valley just below the tower.

The third tallest tower on Sharp's Ridge is 1,345 feet (410 m) the former "Gannett Pacific Tower Knoxville." It is It is owned by Tegna, Inc, licensee of WBIR-TV. Its digital TV signal broadcasts from the top of the tower.

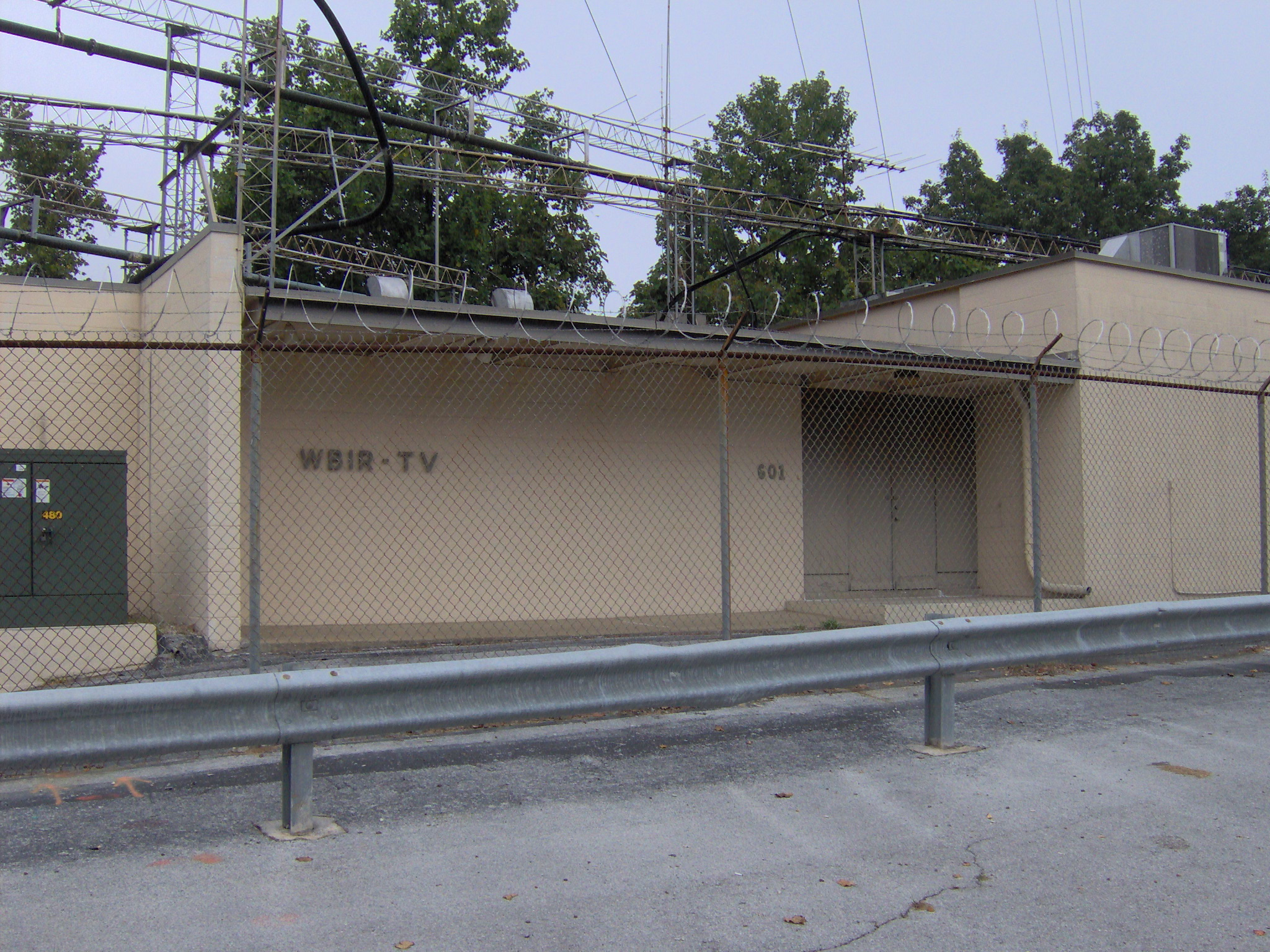
WBIR-TV transmitter building

The fourth tallest tower, the "South Central Communications Tower Knoxville," is 1,017 feet (310 m), and is owned by South Central Communications, licensee of low power TV station WEZK-LP, Channel 28. On that tower is also the antenna for WKNX-TV PSIP, Channel 7. This is also the tower that WTVK-TV, Channel 26 formerly broadcast its analog signal from (that station is now WVLT-TV, PSIP Channel 8). WVLT-TV also broadcast from this tower for a time, after switching to VHF analog Channel 8.

The Sharp's Ridge antenna farm is also the transmitting location for Class C FM radio station, WJXB-FM 97.5, whose antenna is located on the South Central Communications tower. One Class A FM radio station, WKHT-FM 104.5, one Class D FM station W244AT at 96.7 and another Class D FM station W275AD at 102.9 all broadcast from the "Spectracite Tower Knoxville" site.

Various other entities, including city, county, and state government agencies, and cellular telephone companies, also transmit base-to-mobile communications from towers on Sharp's Ridge far shorter than the ones listed above.

== See also ==
- Bays Mountain
- Clinch Mountain
- Holston Mountain
- House Mountain
- Powell Mountain
