= WRID-LD =

Television station in Richmond, Virginia

UHF translating repeater of; WWBT, Richmond, Virginia, and; WUPV, Ashland, Virginia

- Richmond, Virginia; United States
- Channels: Digital: 36 (UHF); Virtual: 12.6, 48, 65.6

Programming
- Affiliations: 12.6: NBC; 48.1: Daystar; 65.6: The CW

Ownership
- Owner: Gray Television; (Gray Television Licensee, LLC)
- Sister stations: WWBT; WUPV

History
- First air date: June 2, 1992
- Former call signs: W48BI (1992–2004); WRID-LP (2004–2016)
- Former channel numbers: Analog: 48 (UHF, 1998–2016); Digital: 48 (UHF, 2014–2021)
- Former affiliations: ShopNBC (2003–2004)
- Call sign meaning: Richmond Daystar

Technical information
- Licensing authority: FCC
- Facility ID: 65116
- Class: LD
- ERP: 15 kW
- HAAT: 210 m (689 ft)
- Transmitter coordinates: 37°30′23″N 77°30′11″W

Links
- Public license information: LMS

WRID-LD (RF channel 36) is a low-power television station in Richmond, Virginia, United States. Owned by Gray Media, it serves as a translating repeater of the main channels of its two sister stations—NBC affiliate WWBT (channel 12) and CW affiliate WUPV (channel 65). WRID-LD's transmitter is located behind Gray's Richmond studio on Midlothian Turnpike (US 60), sharing the same tower with WWBT (WUPV transmits from west of Enfield, northeast of Richmond).

As an artifact of its former ownership, the station continues to carry Daystar on its virtual channel of 48; WWBT and WUPV otherwise identify as alternative digital subchannels of their own channel positions using WRID-LD's spectrum.

== History ==
=== Early history ===
The station signed on June 2, 1992, as W48BI, owned by VVILPTV, Inc. Because of a lack of stations in the market after WUPV, then known as WAWB, dropped The WB for UPN in 1998, it was thought that W48BI was in position to become the market's WB affiliate after the empty channel 19 allocation originally intended for Richmond was moved to Charlottesville, but the network instead shifted to WWBT's overnight hours from 1999 until 2006 out of fear of lack of cable carriage for their programming, even in a non-prime time period, and providers resistant to carrying the network via its cable-only WB 100+ service. Fox affiliate WRLH-TV (channel 35) carried select Kids' WB programs from 1998 to 2001. W48BI continued to program minor networks and brokered local programming until 2003, when it took an affiliation with ShopNBC.

=== Daystar ownership ===
In 2004, the station was purchased by Daystar's commercial station arm, Word of God Fellowship, changing their call letters to WRID-LP (later WRID-LD), carrying the national network feed without any local deviation outside required station identification.

=== Gray ownership ===
On August 27, 2021, Gray Television filed to purchase WRID-LD from Daystar for $630,000. The sale was completed on January 4, 2022. It soon became a UHF repeater of the main channels of WWBT and WUPV within the inner ring of the Richmond market, mainly serving the few viewers who had lost access to either station during the digital transition and did not have access to cable, satellite or streaming. Both WWBT and WUPV broadcast on VHF and are currently unable to shift to the UHF band. As with all Daystar station sales to other broadcasters, Daystar will retain control of one WRID-LD subchannel indefinitely to continue serving as the market's outlet for their network.

== Technical information ==
=== Subchannels ===
The station's signal is multiplexed:

Subchannels of WRID-LD
Subchannel	Res.	Short name	Programming
12.6	1080i	NBC	NBC (WWBT)
48.1	480i	Daystar	Daystar
48.2	480i	Outlaw	Outlaw
65.6	1080i	CW	The CW (WUPV)

Simulcast of subchannels of another station

=== Analog-to-digital transition ===
On January 12, 2007, the FCC granted Word of God Fellowship's request for permission to flash-cut to a digital transmitter on channel 51, extending the request several times with a transfer to channel 48 until it went on the air on November 8, 2014, though the FCC did not issue a final digital license for the station until December 5, 2016.
