= Seven Springs =

Seven Springs may refer to:

== Places ==
In England

- Seven Springs, Gloucestershire, a spring and hamlet, and one possible source of the River Thames

In the United States

- Seven Springs, Pennsylvania
  - Seven Springs Mountain Resort
- Seven Springs, North Carolina
- Seven Springs (Enfield, Virginia), a historic home
- Seven Springs (Bedford, New York), a residence owned by Donald Trump

== Other uses ==
- Seven Springs (restaurant), a South Korean restaurant chain
