= WTVR-TV =

Television station in Richmond, Virginia

- Richmond–Petersburg, Virginia; United States
- City: Richmond, Virginia
- Channels: Digital: 23 (UHF); Virtual: 6
- Branding: CBS 6

Programming
- Affiliations: 6.1: CBS; for others, see § Subchannels

Ownership
- Owner: E. W. Scripps Company; (Scripps Broadcasting Holdings LLC)

History
- First air date: April 22, 1948
- Former call signs: WTVR (1948–1966)
- Former channel numbers: Analog: 6 (VHF, 1948–2009); Digital: 25 (UHF, until 2020)
- Former affiliations: NBC (1948–1955); CBS (secondary 1948–1955, primary 1955–1956); ABC (secondary 1948–1956, primary 1956–1960); DuMont (secondary, 1948–1956); NTA (secondary, 1956–1961)
- Call sign meaning: Television Richmond

Technical information
- Licensing authority: FCC
- Facility ID: 57832
- ERP: 410 kW
- HAAT: 346 m (1,135 ft)
- Transmitter coordinates: 37°30′45.6″N 77°36′4.8″W

Links
- Public license information: Public file; LMS
- Website: wtvr.com

WTVR-TV (channel 6) is a television station in Richmond, Virginia, United States, affiliated with CBS and owned by the E. W. Scripps Company. Its studios are located on West Broad Street on Richmond's West End, and its transmitter is located in Bon Air near the studios of PBS member stations WCVE-TV and WCVW. WTVR-TV's former transmitter is located behind the station's studio, and only WTVR-FM broadcasts from that tower today. It still remains as part of WTVR-TV's history.

WTVR-TV is one of only a few stations in the country to have been affiliated with all three of the original major American television networks.

== History ==
=== Early history ===
When the Federal Communications Commission (FCC) began soliciting bids for the channel 6 license in Richmond, Virginia, it was assumed that the license would go to either Larus and Brother Company, owner of WRVA, or Richmond Newspapers, owner of WRNL, since they were considered Virginia's leading broadcasters. However, for reasons that remain unknown, neither station submitted a bid. The only applicant was auto parts dealer Wilbur Havens and his Richmond Broadcasting Company, which already owned WMBG (1380 AM) and WCOD (98.1 FM). FCC approval was a mere formality, and WTVR debuted on April 22, 1948. It was the first television station to sign on in the state of Virginia, and the first south of Washington, D.C. It became an NBC affiliate June 1, 1948. The station operated from a converted bus garage on West Broad Street, where WMBG had been based since 1939. For many years, WTVR used a colorized version of its original station identification slide to open newscasts.

As it was one of the last stations to get a construction permit before an FCC-imposed freeze on new permits, WTVR was the only station in town until 1955. It carried programming from all four networks of the time—NBC, CBS, ABC and DuMont—but was a primary NBC affiliate. In 1953, WTVR switched to a self-supporting 840-foot (256 m) tower near its studios. The tower has long been reckoned as a fixture of the Richmond skyline.

Channel 6 finally got competition in 1955, when WXEX-TV (channel 8, now WRIC-TV) signed on from neighboring Petersburg and took the NBC affiliation. WTVR then had a brief stint becoming a primary CBS affiliate; this ended in 1956 when Larus-owned WRVA-TV (channel 12, now WWBT) signed on and took the CBS affiliation due to WRVA radio's long history as a CBS radio affiliate. WTVR then carried on as an ABC affiliate until 1960, when CBS cut a new deal with Havens due to channel 12's low ratings. WTVR has been with CBS ever since and is one of the few stations in the country to have been a primary affiliate of all of the "Big Three" networks, like WWBT locally. During the late 1950s, the station was also briefly affiliated with the NTA Film Network. Although Richmond Broadcasting was nowhere near as large as Larus and Richmond Newspapers, WTVR's eight-year head start allowed it to become the ratings leader in Richmond for the better part of its first three decades on the air.

Havens sold WTVR, WMBG, and WCOD to Roy H. Park Communications in 1966, earning a handsome return on his original $500 investment when he started WMBG in 1927. After taking ownership of the properties, the radio stations adopted the TV station's "WTVR" call letters. When Park died in 1993, the company's assets were sold to a Lexington, Kentucky–based group of investors that sold the radio properties separately to various owners, with WTVR-AM-FM going to Clear Channel Communications in 1995.

WTVR began suffering in the ratings in 1994 when CBS lost the rights to broadcast National Football League games to Fox (CBS returned to NFL broadcasting in 1998). However, it recovered by the turn of the century and since then has been a solid runner-up, sometimes waging a spirited battle for second place with WRIC in news ratings.

=== Raycom ownership ===
Park merged with Media General, the successor to Richmond Newspapers, in May 1997. However, Media General could not keep WTVR alongside its flagship newspaper, the Richmond Times-Dispatch, because FCC rules of the time did not allow cross-ownership of newspapers and television stations in the same market. As a result, Media General swapped WTVR to Raycom Media in exchange for WJTV in Jackson, Mississippi, its semi-satellite WHLT in Hattiesburg, Mississippi, and WSAV-TV in Savannah, Georgia, two months later.

WTVR-TV was the only CBS station between Richmond and Roanoke until WCAV signed on in Charlottesville in 2004.

Local features and community programs have included "For Kids' Sake", "Paws for Pets", and Battle of the Brains and a 24-hour weather news channel called "CBS 6 Xtra" broadcast on broadband, digital cable, and digital subchannel 6.2 in the area. The station carried The Tube Music Network on channel 6.3 until its shutdown on October 1, 2007. In March 2011, 6.3 became the new home of CBS 6 Xtra, while 6.2 carries Antenna TV (see below).

=== Swap to Local TV; Tribune ownership; twice-aborted sales to Sinclair ===
On November 12, 2007, Raycom Media announced its intention to purchase the television broadcasting and production properties of Lincoln Financial Media, including rival WWBT. Because WWBT and WTVR ranked as two of the four highest-rated stations in the Richmond market, FCC rules required one of the stations to be divested. Raycom decided to keep the higher-rated WWBT and sell WTVR. On June 24, 2008, Hunt Valley, Maryland-based Sinclair Broadcast Group announced its intent to purchase WTVR and sell local Fox affiliate WRLH-TV (channel 35), which it had owned since 1996. However, the Justice Department, under provisions of a consent decree with Raycom Media, denied Raycom permission to sell WTVR-TV to Sinclair in August 2008.

On January 6, 2009, Raycom resolved the ownership issue by trading WTVR-TV and $83 million to Local TV LLC in exchange for WBRC, the Fox affiliate for Birmingham. The transfer closed on March 31, 2009. As a result of the trade, Local TV owned Virginia's two largest CBS affiliates; it already owned WTKR, the CBS affiliate in Norfolk, the market just to the east of Richmond.

On July 1, 2013, Local TV announced that its stations would be acquired by the Tribune Company. The sale was completed on December 27.

On August 21, 2015, WTVR-TV's newsroom was named in honor of Stephanie Rochon, who anchored the weeknight newscasts from 1999 to 2014. Rochon had died that June after a long struggle with cancer.

On May 8, 2017, Sinclair entered into an agreement to acquire Tribune Media for $3.9 billion, plus the assumption of $2.7 billion in debt held by Tribune. It intended to keep WTVR, selling WRLH and eight other stations to Standard Media Group. The transaction was designated in July 2018 for hearing by an FCC administrative law judge, and Tribune moved to terminate the deal the next month.

=== Sale to Nexstar Media Group and resale to Scripps ===
On December 3, 2018, Irving, Texas–based Nexstar Media Group—which had owned ABC affiliate WRIC-TV (channel 8) since its merger with Media General in January 2017—announced it would acquire the assets of Tribune Media for $6.4 billion in cash and debt. Due to FCC regulations prohibiting Nexstar from owning both WTVR and WRIC, the company had to sell one of the stations to a separate, unrelated company to address the ownership conflict. On March 20, 2019, the Cincinnati-based E. W. Scripps Company announced it would purchase WTVR from Nexstar upon consummation of the merger, marking Scripps' entry into Virginia, as part of the company's sale of nineteen Nexstar- and Tribune-operated stations to Scripps and Tegna Inc. in separate deals worth $1.32 billion. The sale was completed on September 19.

== News operation ==
WTVR was the overall ratings leader in Richmond until the late 1980s, when WWBT surpassed it, mainly in local news ratings and due to strength from WWBT's affiliation with NBC and its top rated prime time lineup then. For most of the time since then, the station has waged a spirited battle with WRIC for second place. During the late 1980s, early 1990s and into the 2000s, WTVR won numerous awards, including the RTNDA News Operation of the Year for two consecutive years.

Between 2016 and 2018, WTVR produced a half-hour newscast for Washington, D.C., sister station WDCW; presentation originated from the WTVR studios, with reporters based at WDCW in Washington. It was cancelled on September 28, 2018, after Tribune announced budget cuts amid the failed Sinclair transaction.

=== Notable former on-air staff ===
- Cindy Hsu – reporter
- Mark Ovenden – sportscaster
- Ukee Washington – weekend sports anchor (1978–1981)
- Bob Woodruff – reporter (1992–1994)

== Technical information ==
=== Subchannels ===
The station's signal is multiplexed:

Subchannels of WTVR-TV
Subchannel	Res.	Short name	Programming
6.1	1080i	WTVR-HD	CBS
6.2	480i	CBS6ANT	CBS6 Xtra (Independent)
6.3	480i	CBS6XTR	Ion Mystery
6.4	480i	CourtTV	Court TV
6.5	480i	ION	Ion
6.6	480i	BUSTED	Busted
6.7	480i	HSN	HSN
65.2	480i	Bounce	Bounce TV (WUPV)

Broadcast on behalf of another station

On April 11, 2022, WTVR-TV began hosting WUPV's 65.2 subchannel, as a result of WUPV converting to ATSC 3.0; in turn, WUPV simulcasts WTVR-TV in the ATSC 3.0 broadcast standard.

=== Analog-to-digital conversion ===
WTVR-TV shut down its analog signal, over VHF channel 6, in the late morning of June 12, 2009, after more than 60 years, the official date on which full-power television stations in the United States transitioned from analog to digital broadcasts under federal mandate. The station's digital signal remained on its pre-transition UHF channel 25, using virtual channel 6. Prior to the transition, the audio component of WTVR-TV's analog channel 6 signal at 87.75 MHz had been heavily promoted as available to listeners tuning to 87.7 on a standard FM radio receiver. WTVR-TV lost this benefit of the analog channel 6 allocation when analog transmission ended. WTVR-TV ended its telecasts on analog channel 6 with "The Star-Spangled Banner", featuring images of WTVR-TV's history and the Raising the Flag on Iwo Jima. WTVR-TV moved its digital signal from the tower it shared with former sister station WTVR-FM to a shared tower with PBS member stations WCVE-TV and WCVW as a result of the 2009 analog to digital conversion.
