= Ovenden (disambiguation) =

Ovenden is a village near Halifax, West Yorkshire, England.

Ovenden may also refer to:

== People ==
- Daniel Macmillan, Viscount Macmillan of Ovenden (born 1974), British fashion designer
- Katharine Macmillan, Viscountess Macmillan of Ovenden (1921–2017), British politician
- Annie Ovenden (born 1945), British fine artist
- Denys Ovenden (born 1922), artist
- Emily Ovenden, British musician and daughter of Annie and Graham Ovenden
- Graham Ovenden (1943–2022), English painter, fine art photographer, writer and architect
- John Ovenden (1942–2018), British politician
- Julian Ovenden (born 1976), English television and film actor
- Keith Ovenden (born 1943), English novelist and biographer
- Mark Ovenden (born 1963), English writer
- Mark Ovenden (sportscaster), American broadcaster
- Richard Ovenden (born 1964), British author and librarian at the Bodleian Library
- Charles Ovenden (1846–1924), Irish Anglican priest, author, and Dean of St. Patrick's Cathedral, Dublin of the Church of Ireland
- Kevin Ovenden (born 1968), British, left-wing, political activist
- Prof Michael Ovenden (1926–1987), British astronomer

== Other uses ==
- Ovenden railway station, a former railway station at Ovenden in West Yorkshire, England
- Ovenden's Mill, Polegate, a windmill in Sussex, England
