= Battle of the Brains =

Virginia high school quiz TV show

Official logo of Battle of the Brains

Battle of the Brains is a quizbowl show in the Richmond and Hampton Roads areas of Virginia. The show is Central Virginia's longest running highschool quiz TV Show. It currently airs on WTVR in the Richmond area, and WTKR in Hampton Roads. The current show began in Richmond in 1975, and it originally aired on a local PBS member station until it was canceled by the station. Its 2002–2003 season was aired on a public-access television cable TV station, before the Richmond CBS affiliate added the show, where it currently airs on Saturday mornings at 10:00 A.M. The Hampton Roads program began with the 2004-2005 season, formerly airing on WAVY-TV. In the 2017-18 season, it airs on WTKR at 11:00 A.M. As of August 2024, it has changed the timeslot to Saturday mornings at 10:00 A.M.

Since the early 2000s, the team to beat in the competition has been the Maggie L. Walker Governor's School in Richmond, although the 2012 champion was Charlottesville High School. Ocean Lakes High School of Virginia Beach is the reigning Hampton Roads area champion.

The show currently matches the Richmond-area winner against the Hampton Roads-area winner in a game called the “Champion's Challenge”. Charlottesville High School is the reigning champion. Also, the 2003-2004 season marked the first time an All-Star game was held from the top individual players representing themselves. The first All-Star game featured eight players from seven different schools, while the second game had eight from six schools.

Beginning with the 2007-2008 season, high schools from Northeastern North Carolina were allowed to compete in the Hampton Roads show.

The show is hosted by WTVR's Cheryl Miller. The Hampton Roads show was hosted by WAVY's Stephanie Harris when it aired on that station. Since the move to WTKR, the Richmond version airs in both markets.

The most recent winner of the Battle of the Brains championship was Blacksburg High School who beat out Jamestown for the title during the 2025-2026 season.

== Regional Competition Rules ==
=== General Rules ===
- Schools may only pre-test once per year.
- Schools must pre-test and compete in the TV viewing area that covers the school.
- Schools outside of a TV viewing area will compete in the region closest to their school.
- The Central Virginia champion will meet the Southeast Virginia champion in a Championship Game.
- The Championship Game will be broadcast on both Central Virginia and Southeast Virginia TV stations

== Tournament Rules ==
=== General Rules ===
- There will be three Toss-Up Rounds and a Category Round.
- If the match ends in a tie, a sudden-death tiebreaker question will be asked. If a student buzzes early with an incorrect answer, the team will be penalized 5 points and the match will be over.
- The decisions of the Battle of the Brains judges in the studio are final and cannot be appealed.

=== Toss-Up Rounds ===
- Each correct answer is worth 10 points. If a student buzzes early with a correct answer, the host will acknowledge the answer and then summarize the reading of the question for the viewing audience.
- Answers must be given within a 5-second interval.
- There is no collaboration among team members during this round.
- A student may buzz before the host has completed the question. However, the host will immediately stop reading the question and go to that student for an answer. If the student answers incorrectly, his/her team will be penalized 10 points. The host will then complete the question. Any member of the opposing team may attempt to answer. There is no penalty should the opposing team stop the host before the question is completed. This is the only situation, other than the category rounds, in which no penalty will be assessed for an incorrect answer given before completion of a question.
- Should the Toss-Up Round end in the middle of a question, the question will be eliminated. If the round ends in the middle of an answer, the student will be allowed to complete the answer (within the 5-second limit). If the answer is incorrect, the opposing team will NOT have an opportunity to respond.
- There is no penalty for an incorrect answer after the host has completed the reading of a question.
- The host will provide the correct answer for the audience should neither team provide an accepted response. A new toss-up question will then be read.

=== Category Round ===
- Teams will be shown five unique categories. Examples of these: (1) 19th Century American Vice Presidents, (2) Italian Operas, or (3) Math Formulas.
- Each category has a total of 10 questions, each worth 5 points.
- A team that correctly answers all ten items in a category will be awarded 20 bonus points.
- A total of one minute per category is allowed. Collaboration is allowed. However, answers are accepted only from the team captain. Teams may pass items, given the time limit. There is no penalty for incorrect answers. The opposing team cannot respond to unanswered items or incorrect responses.
- The team that has the lead will have the first choice of categories. Approximately 15 seconds is allotted to make the choice.
- Following the completion of the first category chosen, the opposing team will select their category

== All Star Rules ==
=== General Rules ===
- The “All-Stars” features 8 individual players.
- Each player competes during 2 Toss-Up rounds and a Category Round.
- The decisions of the Battle of the Brains judges in the studio are final and cannot be appealed.

=== Toss-Up Rounds ===
- Toss-Up questions are worth 10 points each.
- Toss-Up questions interrupted with an incorrect answer before being completed incur a 5-point penalty and the question completed for the opposition.
- There is no penalty for incorrect answers to completed questions.
- After 3 incorrect answers, the correct answer is given.

=== Category Round ===
- There are 16 categories in the Category Round.
- Each specific category is revealed as the flashing categories stop.
- Players may select that category or pass to request an alternate category.
- If an alternate category is requested, the player must take the 2nd selection.
- Each category contains 6 questions worth 5 points.
- Players have 30 seconds for each category.
- Players may pass a question and if time remains, the question will be repeated.
- There is no penalty for incorrect answers.
- If all 6 questions are answered correctly, there will be a 10-point bonus.

=== Sudden Death Round ===
- A “sudden death” round will occur if 2 or more players are tied at the end of the game.
- The first player answering correctly is declared the winner.
- No penalty occurs for early ring-ins and incorrect answers during “sudden death”.

== Champions ==
=== Richmond-area champions ===
- 1982- Collegiate School
- 1984- St. Christopher's School
- 1985- St. Christopher's School
- 1986- Stafford High School
- 1987- Thomas Dale High School
- 1988- Meadowbrook High School
- 1989- Douglas S. Freeman High School
- 1990- Collegiate School
- 1991- Collegiate School
- 1992- Douglas Freeman High School
- 1993- Governor's School
- 1994- Governor's School
- 1995- Governor's School
- 1996- Governor's School
- 1997- St. Christopher's School
- 1998- St. Christopher's School
- 1999- Governor's School
- 2000- Governor's School
- 2001- Collegiate School
- 2002- Maggie Walker Governor's School
- 2003- Blessed Sacrament-Huguenot
- 2004- Maggie Walker Governor's School
- 2005- Charlottesville High School
- 2006- Maggie Walker Governor's School
- 2007- Maggie Walker Governor's School
- 2008- Maggie Walker Governor's School
- 2009- Maggie Walker Governor's School
- 2010- Maggie Walker Governor's School
- 2011- Maggie Walker Governor's School
- 2012- Charlottesville High School

=== Hampton Roads champions ===
- 2005- Kecoughtan High School
- 2006- Ocean Lakes High School
- 2007- Ocean Lakes High School
- 2008- Hickory High School
- 2009- Ocean Lakes High School

=== Champion's Challenge winners ===
- 2005- Charlottesville High School
- 2006- Maggie Walker Governor's School
- 2007- Maggie Walker Governor's School
- 2008- Maggie Walker Governor's School
- 2009- Maggie Walker Governor's School
