= Robert Griggs =

Robert Griggs may refer to:

- Robert Griggs, a character in the film Rambo III
- Robert Fiske Griggs (1881–1962), American botanist
- Sir Robert Charles Griggs (born 1936), American country and jazz musician
- Bob Griggs, host of American children's television program Sailor Bob
