= WVRN =

WVRN may refer to:

- WVRN (FM), a radio station (88.9 FM) licensed to Wittenberg, Wisconsin, United States
- WVRN-TV, a defunct television station (channel 63) in Richmond, Virginia, United States
