= WUPV =

Television station in Ashland, Virginia

ATSC 3.0 station
- Ashland–Richmond–Petersburg, Virginia; United States
- City: Ashland, Virginia
- Channels: Digital: 8 (VHF); Virtual: 65
- Branding: CW Richmond

Programming
- Affiliations: 65.1: The CW; for others, see § Subchannels

Ownership
- Owner: Gray Media; (Gray Television Licensee, LLC)
- Sister stations: WWBT; WRID-LD

History
- First air date: March 9, 1990
- Former call signs: WZXK (1990–1994); WAWB (1994–1997)
- Former channel numbers: Analog: 65 (UHF, 1990–2009); Digital: 47 (UHF, 2002–2019)
- Former affiliations: Independent (1990–1995); The WB (1995–1997); UPN (1997–2006); The WB (August−September 2006, temporary CW transition)
- Call sign meaning: UPN Virginia, referencing previous affiliation

Technical information
- Licensing authority: FCC
- Facility ID: 10897
- ERP: 30 kW
- HAAT: 257 m (843 ft)
- Transmitter coordinates: 37°44′32″N 77°15′14″W
- Translator(s): WRID-LD 65.6 Richmond

Links
- Public license information: Public file; LMS
- Website: www.12onyourside.com/cw-richmond/

WUPV (channel 65) is a television station licensed to Ashland, Virginia, United States, serving the Richmond area as an affiliate of The CW. It is owned by Gray Media alongside NBC affiliate WWBT (channel 12) and WRID-LD (channel 48). The stations share studios on Midlothian Turnpike (US 60) in Richmond, while WUPV's transmitter is located northeast of Richmond in King William County, 1.6 miles (2.6 km) west of Enfield.

Established as a religious TV station in 1990, WZXK joined The WB in 1995 (as WAWB) and switched to UPN in 1997, adopting its present call sign. The result of the switch was to leave The WB without a full-time outlet in Richmond; the network's attempts to build an additional local station were unsuccessful for legal and technical reasons. The station joined The CW on its 2006 launch and today serves as one of two ATSC 3.0 (Next Gen TV) transmitters in central Virginia. The station airs one local newscast from the WWBT newsroom.

== History ==
Christel Inc., run by James E. Campana, had broadcast leased-access religious programming on cable systems in Henrico County since 1978. In 1986, he was granted a construction permit for channel 65 in Ashland after settling with a competing applicant and began a years-long construction process that would involve more than $2 million in funds. The call letters WZXK were chosen at the suggestion of an attorney who knew they would be available and after 10 suggestions were turned down by the Federal Communications Commission. Meanwhile, a tower was built in King William County in 1989 after Hanover County refused to concede a zoning variance to build the mast. Construction was almost halted on the rest of the project due to a sudden cash crunch; the transmitter was left sitting in a warehouse in Kentucky for a time because Christel needed to pay another $118,000.

Channel 65 finally appeared on March 9, 1990. It aired primarily religious programming with some secular shows. However, it also dealt with financial and technical struggles which sometimes converged. In 1992, the station's transmitter failed, but it took time to raise the funds to replace it. That fall, the amount of family secular programming increased.

In February 1994, locally based Bell Broadcasting purchased WZXK, with Christel continuing to program religious fare on the station. That fall, WZXK reached an affiliation deal with the soon-to-launch WB network and became WAWB "WB 65". In 1997, Bell Broadcasting sold the station to Lockwood Broadcasting of Hampton, Virginia, which negotiated to take the primary UPN affiliation. With this move, WAWB took the current call sign of WUPV; it branded first as "UPN 65" and then "UPN Richmond" during its tenure with the network.

After the affiliation swap, there was no over-the-air carrier of WB programming in Richmond until selected shows turned up on NBC affiliate WWBT in 1999; some programs aired first in the afternoon and then in overnight hours through August 31, 2006. This arrangement led to Richmond being one of the worst markets for WB network ratings. One problem was that WWBT could not carry the entire WB prime time lineup; due to time limitations involved in timeshifting network programs and removing show promotions, the station opted not to carry the network's Friday night schedule. Kids' WB programming was cleared on WRLH-TV. While an attempt was made to launch a new station which would have been run by ACME Communications, the proposal died in a technical morass related to the removal of channels 60–69 and 52–59 from television use. The original application, which had been made by Television Capital Corporation of Richmond, specified channel 63 (last used in 1988 when WVRN-TV folded), had to be amended twice to change its channel (first to 52 and then to 39), and was contested on procedural grounds by Lockwood.

In 2006, The WB and UPN merged to form The CW. With The CW effectively forced by default to affiliate with WUPV for full-market distribution, Lockwood entered into a long-term affiliation agreement for three of its stations in April 2006. Just days before the new network's launch that September, Lockwood sold WUPV to Southeastern Media Holdings, a subsidiary of Community Newspaper Holdings. That company's stations were all operated under local marketing agreements, covering all station functions but ad sales, by Raycom Media, then-owner of Richmond CBS affiliate WTVR-TV. In 2008, Raycom acquired Lincoln Financial Media and WWBT; WTVR was sold to Local TV LLC in 2009.

In 2011, Community Newspaper Holdings sold Southeastern Media Holdings and its four stations (including WUPV) to Thomas Henson (which later transferred in the same year its shares to American Spirit Media, which he owned) for $24 million and the assumption of $50 million in debt.

=== Sale to Gray Television ===
On June 25, 2018, Atlanta-based Gray Television announced it had reached an agreement with Raycom to merge their respective broadcasting assets (consisting of Raycom's 63 existing owned-and/or-operated television stations, and Gray's 93 television stations) under the former's corporate umbrella in a cash-and-stock merger transaction valued at $3.6 billion. In advance of the merger, Raycom exercised its options to purchase WUPV and KYOU-TV in Ottumwa, Iowa, outright from American Spirit Media. The sale was approved on December 20 of that year and was completed on January 2, 2019.

== Newscasts ==
On March 5, 2007, WUPV launched a 35-minute weeknight newscast produced by WTVR called The CW News @ 10. This competed against WRLH's nightly hour-long broadcast, which was produced by WWBT. Weekend newscasts began on October 20, 2007, and ended a year later on October 19, 2008; the final weeknight show aired on November 7. The change was cited as a business decision, though it had been previously stated that WWBT would eventually become the news provider for WUPV in addition to WRLH.

In January 2009, a new 6:30 p.m. newscast from WWBT was launched on WUPV. The newscast moved to 4:30 p.m. in 2017 and was absorbed by WWBT's existing 4 p.m. newscast in 2019. By 2022, the only local news program on WUPV was a half-hour 7 p.m. newscast, NBC12 News on CW Richmond, started in January 2020. A two-hour extension of 12 On Your Side Today, airing at 8 a.m., debuted in June 2024.

== Technical information ==
=== Subchannels ===
WUPV provides five subchannels, which are carried in ATSC 1.0 format on the multiplexes of the other stations participating in the ATSC 3.0 arrangement.

Subchannels provided by WUPV (ATSC 1.0)
Subchannel	Res.	Short name	Programming	ATSC 1.0 host
65.1	1080i	WUPV-DT	The CW	WWBT
65.2	480i	Bounce	Bounce TV	WTVR-TV
65.3	480i	Grit	Grit	WRLH-TV
65.4	480i	The365	365BLK	WRIC-TV
65.5	480i	StartTV	Start TV	WRIC-TV

In the immediate Richmond area, WRID-LD provides second transmissions of the main program streams of WWBT (12.6) and WUPV (65.6) on the UHF band.

=== ATSC 3.0 lighthouse ===
On April 11, 2022, WUPV and WCVW launched ATSC 3.0 (Next Gen TV) signals in the Richmond area. The WUPV multiplex transmits all five of Richmond's commercial stations in the format. The WUPV transmitter located northeast of Richmond in King William County, 1.6 miles (2.6 km) west of Enfield.

Subchannels of WUPV (ATSC 3.0)
Subchannel	Res.	Short name	Programming
6.1	1080p	WTVR	CBS (WTVR-TV)
8.1	720p	WRIC-TV	ABC (WRIC-TV)
12.1	1080p	WWBT-HD	NBC (WWBT)
35.1	720p	WRLH	Fox (WRLH-TV)
35.10	1080p	T2	T2
35.11	1080p	PBTV	Pickleballtv
65.1	1080p	WUPV-HD	The CW

Subchannel broadcast with digital rights management
Subchannel streamed via the Internet

=== Analog-to-digital conversion ===
WUPV shut down its analog signal, over UHF channel 65, on June 12, 2009, the official date on which full-power television stations in the United States transitioned from analog to digital broadcasts under federal mandate. The station's digital signal remained on its pre-transition UHF channel 47. American Spirit Media was paid to move WUPV to the VHF band in the 2016 United States wireless spectrum auction.
