= Act III Broadcasting =

American communications company

Act III Broadcasting was a company that owned several television stations that started as independents, and later became Fox affiliates. The stations were located in medium-sized DMA's (markets) and were primarily UHF stations. Act III Broadcasting was in business from 1986 to 1995 when it was sold to ABRY Partners/Sullivan Broadcasting for US$500 million (equivalent to $940 million in 2024). Television producer Norman Lear owned a controlling stake in Act III Broadcasting through his company Act III Communications.

== Early experience in broadcasting ==
Prior to the formation of Act III, Lear had a history in television station ownership. Along with his longtime business partners Jerry Perenchio and Bud Yorkin, Lear acquired WNJU-TV, a UHF independent station in the New York City area. The station offered religious English-language programming in the mornings and Spanish programming weekday afternoons and evenings. On weekend afternoons, the station offered a variety of ethnic brokered programming. Under their ownership, the station phased out the ethnic shows in favor of more Spanish entertainment programming.

In 1984, WNJU formed an alliance with Weigel Broadcasting's WCIU in Chicago and locally owned KSTS in San Jose to acquire Spanish programming to air on all three stations under a network called NetSpan. Blair Broadcasting, which had just acquired WSCV in Miami and KVEA in Los Angeles and converted these into full-time Spanish independent outlets, joined the alliance in 1985. WNJU and KSTS would be sold in 1986 to Reliance Capital Group, which separately acquired Blair Broadcasting; the sale marked Lear and Perenchio's exit from the station business. The following year, Reliance would consolidate its Spanish-language holdings into the new Telemundo network, which is now owned by NBCUniversal. WCIU would be in that alliance for another year but retained by Weigel Broadcasting. Telemundo would eventually acquire Univision affiliate WSNS in Chicago, causing Univision to affiliate part-time with WCIU once again until it could buy WGBO in 1994.

These early, primarily Spanish-language, stations are unrelated to the later Act III Broadcasting, which was launched in late 1985. However, they are part of Norman Lear's early broadcast ownership experience.

== History ==
Act III Broadcasting was formed as a subsidiary of Act III Communications in 1986, controlled primarily by Norman Lear, who had just sold WNJU. It ran primarily under the leadership of Tom McGrath and Burt Ellis. McGrath and Ellis had met in 1984, when McGrath was with Columbia Pictures, and the two had researched the value of independent TV stations at great length, a strategy that was later realized with the launch of Act III. McGrath was promoted to vice president on December 12, 1987.

Act III launched in early 1986; it made its debut by acquiring Fox affiliate WNRW in the Piedmont Triad from the TVX Broadcast Group, controlled by Gene Loving, for US$11 million (equivalent to $27 million in 2024). TVX had signed an affiliation deal with Fox; a clause in this deal stipulated that if TVX sold one of its underperforming stations, Fox could disaffiliate from that station. This was not the case in the Piedmont Triad, because WNRW's rival station WGGT (now WMYV) was in bankruptcy, but it still ran a comparatively low-budget schedule. This solidified Act III's strategy of acquiring stations in mid-tier DMAs, with the added spin of affiliating with the fast-growing Fox network which was rapidly emerging as a force in Broadcasting.

In 1987, it bought out its second station, WTAT in Charleston, South Carolina, from a local group led by Terry Trousdale, for $4.8 million (equivalent to $11.3 million in 2024). WTAT's acquisition included restructuring ownership to gain majority control, but retained the stations limited partners.

On October 12, 1987, Act III acquired WRGT-TV in Dayton, Ohio, and WVAH-TV in Charleston, West Virginia, from Meridian Broadcasting for $22 million (equivalent to $52 million in 2024). The transaction also included a construction permit for channel 11 in Charleston.

In early 1988, Act III acquired WZTV in Nashville, Tennessee, from Multimedia, Inc., followed in late 1988 with its $12 million (equivalent to $27 million in 2024) acquisition of WUHF in Rochester, New York, from Malrite TV. In 1988, Act III bought out WRLH from Busse Communications, and also acquired WVRN's assets, and integrated into WRLH's programming schedule, which effectively go dark by September, which claimed it was $7-$8 million. It was finalized by September 15. That same year, Act III mounted an ultimately unsuccessful attempt to acquire WDBD in Jackson, Mississippi, and WZDX in Huntsville, Alabama, from Media Central, Inc. formerly under the control of Mort Kent but then in Chapter 11 proceedings.

In 1987, Act III successfully petitioned the FCC to allow it to move WVAH from channel 23 to the last VHF frequency in the market, channel 11. WVAH's signal on channel 23 was not strong enough to reach the entire market—a 61-county behemoth occupying rugged terrain in three states. The FCC granted the request, and WVAH moved to channel 11 on April 11, 1988.

This sort of deal-making characterized Act III into 1990, a year when it made several innovative deals in 1990 that positioned its stations the only general entertainment stations in their markets. In Nashville, WXMT (originally WCAY, now WUXP-TV), then the Fox affiliate, had been sold by TVX in 1988 to Michael Thompson. Fox was considering executing its policy that no broadcaster could control more than eight Fox affiliates by pulling the Fox affiliation from WXMT and moving it to WZTV. In January 1990, Act III cut a deal in which WZTV would take all of WXMT's shows, leaving WXMT with only religious and home shopping shows. However, Thompson backed out of the deal at the last minute. Fox then announced it was moving its affiliation to WZTV as of February. At the end of January, MT Communications and Act III made a revised deal, which allowed WXMT to keep barter cartoons and several low budget syndicated shows, giving WZTV all the cash programming, which included the better and more expensive shows, along with Fox programming. WXMT's daily schedule now featured home shopping for 15 hours, religion 3 hours, cartoons 3 hours, and low-budget shows 3 hours. While WXMT was not eliminated as a competitor, it was left with a much weaker schedule.

In Buffalo, Act III bought WUTV channel 29 in Buffalo from Citadel Communications in 1989, and merged all assets of WNYB into WUTV's programming schedule. Act III proceeded to get a duopoly waiver citing cross-ownership with existing WUHF in Rochester, which Act III then-recently acquired. Act III then restored its Fox affiliation to WUTV, as well as its rights to the Buffalo Sabres games, which WNYB obtained when the deal closed in 1990. With the deal, the Sabres received a minority stake in the new WUTV

McGrath stepped down as chairman of Act III Broadcasting in 1990 when he left to join Time Warner as President of International. Bert Ellis continued the company's strategy into 1991.

To obtain dominance in the Piedmont Triad, Act III embarked on another programming-buying deal in 1991. It bought the entire program inventory of WGGT, the other general entertainment station in the market, and merged it onto WNRW's schedule. WGGT's owner, Guilford Broadcasters, agreed to simulcast WNRW's signal on WGGT, making WGGT a full satellite of WNRW. This created a strong combined signal (with over 60% overlap) which became known as the "Piedmont Superstation." For all intents and purposes, Act III's stations were now the only general-entertainment stations in their markets, except for Nashville.

Bert Ellis left Act III in early 1992 to form Ellis Communications and continue to pursue station acquisitions eventually building a group of 13 TV stations, two radio stations and Raycom Sports.

At the time Act III Broadcasting was sold to ABRY Partners II in June 1995, seven of the company's Fox-affiliated television stations, with the exception being the company's Nashville, Tennessee-based television station WZTV-TV, had also become affiliates of the then-fledgling United Paramount Network (UPN)

=== Local marketing agreements ===
In the late 1980s Act III pioneered the concept of the local marketing agreement, or LMA for short. Under an LMA, one station would buy all or most of another station's broadcast day and take over its operations, but the other station would technically remain under separate ownership. The senior partner in the LMA would then program the other station with shows that it didn't have time to air. Act III, however, was not interested in this concept. It was the approval of the LMA concept that allowed Act III to consolidate ownership and control of programming in small markets, significantly enhancing the value of its stations. This revolution in broadcasting was the first step in the FCC's eventual de-regulation of station ownership and the lifting of the 12-station cap on ownership that had existed for decades prior to Act III's initiatives.

=== Management ===
The management team of Act III Broadcasting from its formation in 1985 through 1991 consisted of Tom McGrath, Chairman who was president and chief operating officer of Norman Lear's holding company, Act III Communications; U. Bertram Ellis, Jr. (a.k.a. Bert Ellis), chief executive officer; Bill Castleman, President and Chief Operating Officer; Dick Kantor, EVP and Head of Programming; and Blair Schmidt-Fellner as CFO. All of Act III's station acquisitions and other transactions were conducted during this period. McGrath was succeeded by Hal Gaba in late 1990; Bill Castleman was succeeded by Dick Kantor and Blair Schmidt-Fellner was succeeded by John DeLorenzo and Warren Spector. Ellis left in early 1992 to form Ellis Communications.

== Sale to ABRY ==
ABRY Partners, a Boston-based investment firm, already owned two Fox network affiliates when the company entered into an agreement to acquire Norman Lear's controlling interest in Act III Broadcasting in early September 1991. The remaining shareholders, including Prudential Insurance, agreed to roll over their shares into the new company. However, the deal fell apart shortly thereafter, with CEO Bert Ellis declaring the deal "dead as a doornail."

Ellis left Act III in early 1992 to form Ellis Communications, and the group was put under the leadership of long-time Lear and Perenchio associate Hal Gaba. Gaba did not continue to growth of the group or conduct any acquisitions; instead, he focused on selling the group as the financial markets began to recover from the deep recession of 1990-92 and the collapse of Drexel Burnham Lambert. During the 1989-1991 period, virtually no takeover activity was undertaken and asset values in general experienced steep, if temporary, declines.

Gaba and Lear successfully exited the broadcasting business with the sale of Act III Broadcasting to ABRY for an estimated $500 million, closing in June 1995. ABRY had embarked on a similar "roll-up" of independent stations a few years earlier, including the LMA strategy. Lear sold Act III Broadcasting for over $500 million (a 600% return on his original investment), despite receiving a far lower estimate of $15 million only a few years earlier from Boston Ventures, a group that had sought to acquire the stations during the height of the 1990 recession. The Act III stations then became part of Sullivan Broadcasting, a partnership between ABRY and Dan Sullivan, who had previously run Clear Channel Communications' television station group. This record-setting valuation came despite Fox's policy of not allowing acquisitions that resulted in one company controlling more than eight Fox affiliates, which acted as a deterrent on some potential bidders. Sinclair Broadcast Group then bought Sullivan in 1998; Sinclair had also implemented the LMA concept back in 1991. Shortly afterwards, Sullivan announced that they would retain the Utica station WFXV and sister station WPNY-LD through his new company Quorum Broadcasting (which was eventually absorbed into what is now Nexstar Media Group in 2003).

== Financing ==
Although majority-controlled by Norman Lear, Act III Broadcasting was financed by a large group of other Wall Street interests and shareholders. The company was seeded by Lear, but quickly added the General Motors Pension Fund as a shareholder. Debt was provided by GE Capital. The company was comprehensively refinanced in 1989 with a $100m bond offering taken down by Prudential Insurance. The Prudential notes were themselves re-financed following the recovery from the 1989–92 recession, in 1993 at a lower rate. Act III's judicious use of leverage in an industry historically financed with limited partnerships was considered a model of leveraged finance and resulted in a case study at the University of Virginia Darden School of Business. The eventual exit at over a 600% return on investment marks one of the most successful broadcast ventures in industry history. In 1991, it was reported that Lear, through Act III Communications, controlled 35% of the common stock of Act III Broadcasting and 80% of the voting interests. Prior to the sale in 1997/98 the company undertook various buyouts of minority interests which increased the Act III Communications/Lear stake to an undetermined, but higher level.

== Subsequent disposition of Act III Broadcasting stations ==
- Rochester: WUHF is still one of only four full-power stations because of the lack of available licenses.
- Buffalo: Grant Broadcasting System II acquired the channel 26 license in Jamestown, New York, in 1995. Grant then swapped channel 26 to TCT, who would move WNYB over there, and in return, Grant got channel 49, which became WNYO-TV, a WB affiliate. WNYO was sold to Sinclair in 2001.
- Dayton: WRGT was not sold to Sinclair directly, as by 1998 it also owned then-NBC affiliate WKEF, which was acquired from Max Media Properties. In the end, it was sold to Glencairn, Ltd./Cunningham Broadcasting instead. However, Sinclair effectively owns WRGT and the other Cunningham-owned stations because the Smith family, the founders of Sinclair, controls most of Cunningham's stock.
- Huntington/Charleston: WVAH was sold to Glencairn, Ltd. in 1998, a year after Sinclair acquired ABC affiliate WCHS-TV.
- Piedmont Triad: In 1995, Fox bought what was then the ABC affiliate, WGHP. ABC then went to WNRW/WGGT; coinciding with the ABC affiliation, WNRW became WXLV-TV. Sullivan then had Mission Broadcasting buy WGGT. Mission ended the simulcast and transformed WGGT into WUPN-TV, a UPN affiliate. Sinclair bought WUPN outright in 2001, and later changed its callsign to WMYV, in anticipation of its MyNetworkTV affiliation.
- Nashville: Abry began managing WXMT under a LMA in 1995, giving that station a UPN affiliation, and more entertainment shows as WZTV decided to focus on news and first-run syndicated shows. WXMT eventually changed calls to WUXP. Sinclair bought WUXP outright in 2001.
- Charleston, South Carolina: WTAT, like WRGT above, could not be acquired by Sinclair Broadcast Group (despite an attempt to buy it outright in 2001 along with other stations still held by Sullivan) because by this time it also owned then-UPN affiliate WMMP. In the end, it was sold to Glencairn/Cunningham instead.
- Richmond: While channel 63 never returned, a religious station on channel 65 signed on in 1990. That station eventually went to general entertainment, and became a WB affiliate in 1995, switching to UPN three years later. That station is currently WUPV, a CW affiliate owned by Gray Television.

== Former stations ==
- Stations are arranged in alphabetical order by state and city of license.

Stations owned by Act III Broadcasting
Media market	State	Station	Purchased	Sold	Notes
Buffalo	New York	WUTV	1990	1995	
New York City	New York	WNJU	1979	1986	
Rochester	New York	WUHF	1989	1995	
High Point–Greensboro–Winston-Salem	North Carolina	WNRW	1987	1995	(Note: Renamed to WXLV-TV prior to 1995 sale.)
Dayton	Ohio	WRGT-TV	1987	1995	
Charleston	South Carolina	WTAT-TV	1987	1995	
Nashville	Tennessee	WZTV	1988	1995	
Richmond	Virginia	WRLH-TV	1988	1995	
Charleston–Huntington	West Virginia	WVAH-TV	1987	1995	
