= Judi Moen =

American talk show host and news reporter

Judith Moen Stanley (born November 28, 1954), known professionally as Judi Moen and Judith Moen, is a former talk show host and news reporter for WBBM-TV in Chicago from 1981 until 1994 and a program host for the Travel Channel in the 1990s.

== Early life and education ==
A Minnesota native, Moen attended Ridgewater College in Minnesota and earned a master's degree in journalism in 1978 from Northwestern University's Medill School of Journalism.

== Professional career ==
Moen began her broadcasting career working for TV stations in Rockford, Illinois and Charleston, South Carolina. In 1981, Moen joined WBBM-TV in Chicago as the host of the weekday morning public-affairs program Daybreak. Moen also co-hosted the public-affairs program Two on 2 along with Bob Wallace and later with Aldo Gandia until the program was canceled in 1988. After Two on 2 was canceled, Moen stayed at WBBM until 1993, working as a fill-in general assignment news reporter and also hosting local weekday morning news cut-ins and a weekend talk show titled Newday Chicago.

Moen left WBBM-TV in 1990 to care for her family, but returned in late 1991 as a part-time and weekend reporter. She left the station for a second time in 1994.

Moen moved to WTKR-TV in Norfolk, Virginia in the mid-1990s, and also worked for the Travel Channel, hosting a series on romantic inns.

Today, Moen and her husband, Thomas B. Stanley III, live in the Atlanta area and advocates on behalf of people with disabilities.
