= Ed Hughes (anchor) =

American journalist (1938–2004)

Edward F. Hughes
- Born: March 30, 1938
- Died: June 1, 2004 (aged 66)
- Occupation: Journalist

Edward F. Hughes (March 30, 1938 – June 1, 2004) was a former news anchor best known for his longtime role as a news anchor for Norfolk, Virginia CBS affiliate WTKR from 1967 (when the station was known as WTAR) until shortly before his death in 2004. In addition, he was also the morning news anchor at radio station Z-104 for a time during the 1980s.

== Early life and career ==
Hughes was a former Navy veteran who had spent four years as a fleet radio operator during his service in the Navy. Hughes was first hired by what was then WTAR-AM after having worked for television stations in Maryland and WXEX-TV in Richmond, Virginia; later being added to what was then WTAR-TV.

== Reputation ==
Hughes was a trusted anchor for 37 years, known for his ability to report a story in an unbiased fashion that did not favor one side over another. He never embellished a story or sensationalized it for the sake of ratings or to get attention. Hughes won numerous awards for journalism and broadcasting during his career; including Associated Press awards each year from 1972–84, and especially enjoyed reporting on military news. During his tenure, Hughes had served as a reporter, news anchor and for a short time news director.

Hughes was the inspiration for the creation of "WSHS-TV," a news-like TV club at local Smithfield High School founded in 1991 by two senior school students.

He was often referred to as the "Walter Cronkite of Hampton Roads."

== Illness and death ==
Hughes had been diagnosed with colon cancer in 2002; continuing to work as WTKR noon and 5:30 p.m. anchor as able; stepping aside to undergo chemotherapy in November 2002 before returning three months later, but suffered a "very serious relapse" following surgery in August 2003. He died on June 1, 2004, at the age of 66; leaving seven children and five grandchildren behind. Hughes was also married three times.
