= WRIC-TV =

Television station in Petersburg, Virginia

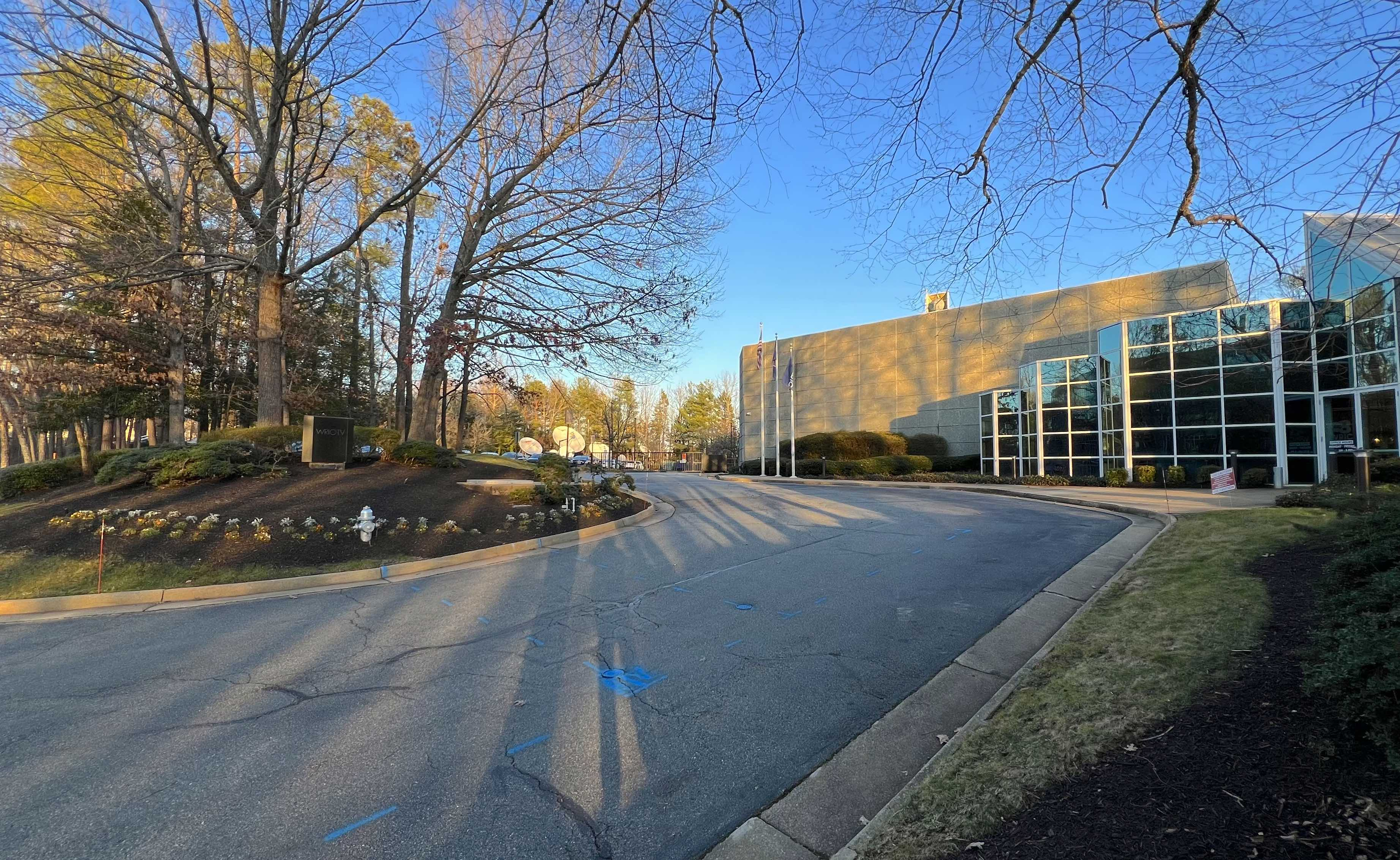
- WRIC-TV's studios and offices in Chesterfield County
- Petersburg–Richmond, Virginia; United States
- City: Petersburg, Virginia
- Channels: Digital: 28 (UHF); Virtual: 8
- Branding: ABC 8; 8 News

Programming
- Affiliations: 8.1: ABC; for others, see § Subchannels

Ownership
- Owner: Nexstar Media Group; (Nexstar Media Inc.)

History
- First air date: August 15, 1955
- Former call signs: WPRG (CP, 1954–1955); WVAA (CP, 1955); WXEX-TV (1955–1990)
- Former channel numbers: Analog: 8 (VHF, 1955–2009); Digital: 22 (UHF, until 2020)
- Former affiliations: NBC (1955–1965)
- Call sign meaning: "Richmond"; also the IATA code for Richmond International Airport

Technical information
- Licensing authority: FCC
- Facility ID: 74416
- ERP: 1,000 kW
- HAAT: 345.7 m (1,134 ft)
- Transmitter coordinates: 37°30′45.6″N 77°36′4.8″W

Links
- Public license information: Public file; LMS
- Website: www.wric.com

WRIC-TV (channel 8) is a television station licensed to Petersburg, Virginia, United States, serving as the ABC affiliate for the Richmond area. Owned by Nexstar Media Group, the station maintains studios in unincorporated Chesterfield County (with a Richmond mailing address), overlooking Powhite Parkway just south of the Midlothian Turnpike interchange. Its transmitter is located in Bon Air, on a tower shared with local PBS member stations WCVE (channel 23) and WCVW (channel 57).

== History ==
The station began operation on August 15, 1955 as WXEX-TV, an NBC affiliate. It was owned by Thomas Tinsley, along with WLEE radio, via the Petersburg Television Corporation. Channel 8's transmitter was located in the Bermuda Hundred area of eastern Chesterfield County, while the main studios were in Petersburg. Originally, it did not cover Richmond nearly as well as did WTVR-TV (channel 6) and WRVA-TV (channel 12, now WWBT). At first, a Richmond sales office was located at WLEE's studios on West Broad Street in Richmond; later, satellite studios were established just off Midlothian Turnpike in Bon Air.

The station swapped affiliations with channel 12 in 1965 and became an ABC affiliate. It has been with that network ever since. In 1968, Tinsley sold WXEX-TV and WLEE to the Nationwide Communications subsidiary of Nationwide Mutual Insurance Company. In 1969, a fire destroyed its original Petersburg studios. For a few weeks, the station had to broadcast from its transmitter, then set up temporary offices and studios in a vacated store in Petersburg. The station later moved to a brand new facility on Crater Road that it named Blandford Manor. In 1981, Nationwide sold off sister station WLEE.

On April 23, 1990, the station moved its studios to the current location on Arboretum Place in Chesterfield County. With the new studios came new call letters, WRIC-TV. However, it is still licensed to Petersburg; unlike the other stations in the market, it identifies as "Petersburg–Richmond". Nationwide sold all three of its ABC-affiliated television stations, including WRIC, to Young Broadcasting in 1993.

The station's owner, Young Broadcasting, went into Chapter 11 bankruptcy in 2009. The station was part of a bankruptcy auction scheduled for July 14, 2009, but canceled at the last minute. On July 22, a bankruptcy judge approved a plan in which Young's secured lenders would take over the company.

On June 6, 2013, Young Broadcasting announced that it would merge with locally based Media General. Upon consummation, the merger made WRIC-TV one of two flagships of Media General (WFLA-TV in Tampa served as the home base of Media General's broadcast division). It was the first legal opportunity for Media General in years to own a station in its hometown. Its predecessor, Richmond Newspapers, lost out in the bidding for WWBT's forerunner, WRVA-TV, in 1956 due to the FCC's preference for a non-newspaper owner. Media General merged with WTVR's then-parent company, Park Communications, but had to immediately put WTVR on the market due to cross-ownership restrictions involving the flagship Richmond Times-Dispatch, which was sold with Media General's newspaper business in 2012 to BH Media. The merger also made WRIC a sister station to Roanoke's NBC affiliate, WSLS-TV. The merger was approved by the FCC on November 8, after Media General shareholders approved the merger a day earlier; it was completed on November 12.

On September 8, 2015, Media General announced that it would acquire the Des Moines, Iowa–based Meredith Corporation for $2.4 billion with the intention to name the combined group Meredith Media General if the sale were finalized. However, on September 28, Irving, Texas-based Nexstar Broadcasting Group made an unsolicited cash-and-stock merger offer for Media General, originally valued at $14.50 per share. On November 16, following opposition to the merger with Meredith by minority shareholders Oppenheimer Holdings and Starboard Capital (primarily because Meredith's magazine properties were included in the deal, which would have re-entered Media General into publishing after it sold its newspapers to BH Media in 2012 to reduce debt) and the rejection of Nexstar's initial offer by company management, Media General agreed to enter into negotiations with Nexstar on a suitable counter deal, while the Meredith merger proposal remained active; the two eventually concluded negotiations on January 6, 2016, reaching a merger agreement for valued at $17.14 per share (an evaluation of $4.6 billion, plus the assumption of $2.3 billion debt).

On January 27, 2016, Meredith formally broke off the proposed merger with Media General and accepted the termination fee of $60 million previously negotiated under the original merger proposal; Media General subsequently signed an agreement to be acquired by Nexstar, in exchange for giving Meredith right of first refusal to acquire any broadcast or digital properties that may be divested (a clause that Meredith did not exercise). The transaction was approved by the FCC on January 11, 2017; the sale was completed on January 17, at which point the existing Nexstar stations and the former Media General outlets that neither group had to sell to rectify ownership conflicts in certain markets became part of the renamed Nexstar Media Group; this brought WRIC as well as NBC affiliate WAVY-TV and Fox affiliate WVBT in Norfolk (which became sister properties to WRIC through Media General's 2015 acquisition of LIN Media) under common ownership with the Roanoke duopoly of Fox affiliate WFXR and CW affiliate WWCW (which necessitated Media General to sell WSLS-TV to Graham Media Group to alleviate said ownership conflict with the two existing Nexstar-owned stations). On September 20, 2017, the station dropped its longtime brand of WRIC-TV 8 – or "TV 8" for short – and is now branded on-air as "ABC 8".

On December 3, 2018, Nexstar announced it would acquire the assets of Chicago-based Tribune Media—which has owned CBS affiliate WTVR since 2009—for $6.4 billion in cash and debt. Nexstar was precluded from acquiring WTVR directly or indirectly, as FCC regulations prohibit common ownership of two or more of the four highest-rated stations in the same media market. (Furthermore, any attempt by Nexstar to assume the operations of WTVR through local marketing or shared services agreements would have been subject to regulatory hurdles that could have delayed completion of the FCC and Justice Department's review and approval process for the acquisition.) As such, Nexstar was required to sell either WTVR or WRIC to a separate, unrelated company to address the ownership conflict. On March 20, 2019, it was announced that Nexstar would keep WRIC-TV and sell WTVR to Cincinnati-based E. W. Scripps Company, as part of the company's sale of nineteen Nexstar- and Tribune-operated stations to Scripps and Tegna Inc. in separate deals worth $1.32 billion; the transaction marked Scripps' entry into Virginia.

== News operation ==
On September 28, 2011, WRIC-TV became the third commercial station (behind WWBT and WTVR) in Richmond to broadcast local news in high definition.

In October 2023, Nexstar named Steven Blanchard general manager of WRIC, wric.com, and related digital and social media channels.

=== Notable former on-air staff ===
- Gretchen Carlson – political reporter (1989–1992)
- Ed Hughes – anchor and news director (mid-1960s)
- Matt Lauer – host of PM Magazine (1980–1981)
- Wilma Smith – 6 pm newscaster and Wilma Smith Show host (1972–1977)

== Technical information ==
=== Subchannels ===
The station's digital signal is multiplexed:

Subchannels of WRIC-TV
Subchannel	Res.	Short name	Programming
8.1	720p	WRIC-TV	ABC
8.2	480i	Antenna	Antenna TV
8.3	480i	Cozi	Cozi TV
8.4	480i	Laff	Laff
65.4	480i	The365	365BLK (WUPV)
65.5	480i	StartTV	Start TV (WUPV)

Broadcast on behalf of another station

On November 1, 2011, WRIC-TV ceased to carry The Country Network on the station's 8.2 subchannel after Young terminated their deal with TCN and dropped the channel on all of its stations that carried it. After Young made a deal to carry ABC's Live Well Network, it launched on June 1, 2012, on WRIC's 8.2 subchannel. On May 30, 2015, at 4:00 am, WRIC-TV (along with all other former-Young Broadcasting stations who were carrying it) ceased to carry Live Well Network on the station's 8.2 subchannel. On November 1, 2015, WRIC-TV began carrying Ion Television on its 8.2 subchannel. On February 3, 2016, WRIC-TV began carrying GetTV on its 8.3 subchannel (now seen on WFWG-LD's 30.3 subchannel as of February 7, 2021). On October 25, 2017, WRIC-TV began carrying Laff on its 8.4 subchannel.

On April 11, 2022, WRIC-TV began hosting WUPV's 65.4 and 65.5 subchannels, as a result of WUPV converting to ATSC 3.0; in turn, WUPV simulcasts WRIC-TV in the ATSC 3.0 broadcast standard.

=== Analog-to-digital conversion ===
WRIC-TV ended regular programming on its analog signal, over VHF channel 8, on June 12, 2009, the official date on which full-power television stations in the United States transitioned from analog to digital broadcasts under federal mandate. The station's digital signal remained on its pre-transition UHF channel 22, using virtual channel 8.

As part of the SAFER Act, WRIC-TV kept its analog signal on the air until June 26 to inform viewers of the digital television transition through a loop of public service announcements from the National Association of Broadcasters.
