= Jim Vicevich =

American radio host

Jim Vicevich (/ˈvaɪsəvɪtʃ/) is an American talk radio host based in Hartford, Connecticut. His show Sound Off Connecticut deals with local, as well as national, topics ranging from politics, economics and social issues, to movies and music. Vicevich, a self-labeled social libertarian and political conservative, often frames his commentary between bumper-music from upstart Americana performers. He is known locally as "Connecticut's Rush Limbaugh".

== Sound Off Connecticut ==
Vicevich's show, which airs on WTIC invites phone calls from listeners from throughout Connecticut to discuss the topics of the day. Additionally, Sound Off Connecticut had a special episode each Friday called "Free-For-All Friday" where listeners were invited to phone in or email to discuss almost any topic.

He gained a national audience in 2005 when WTIC started live-streaming the program. Podcasts of Vicevich's show are still posted at www.wtic.com.

In addition to taking calls from listeners, Sound Off Connecticut featured interviews with conservative and—less frequently—Democratic political pundits, activists, lobbyists, and elected officials. Repeat interviewees over the years have included Connecticut governors John G. Rowland and M. Jodi Rell, Power Line blogger John Hinderaker, several members of the Heritage Foundation, and conservative columnists Michelle Malkin, Ann Coulter, and Walter E. Williams. Each Friday, Vicevich interviewed film critic Russ "Mr. MovieFone" Leatherman to discuss opinions on current and upcoming movies.

His views are borderline conservative, in addition to being pro-Iraq war, pro-military and anti-Democratic Party. However, in 2007 he opposed efforts by Governor Rell, a Republican, to raise the state income tax and he voiced opposition to the immigration reform plan advanced by President George W. Bush.

Vicevich resides in the Farmington Valley of Connecticut.

== Career ==
After graduating with an economics degree from Bucknell University, where he was a DJ on the college's radio station WVBU, in 1974 and earning his master's degree from Boston University in 1977, Vicevich started his broadcast career at WTAR-TV in Norfolk, Virginia, where his coverage of the state's economy earned him the Associated Press Douglas Southall Freeman Award for outstanding journalism. In 1980, he moved to Connecticut to become the business editor for WFSB-TV, the local CBS affiliate, and later for NBC affiliate WVIT-TV. He went on to join CPTV in 1996 as a producer for an hour-long news magazine show entitled Connecticut Journal which covered state businesses and topics of personal finance, and took over as the anchor of the show in 1999. Over the years, he has earned a total of six Emmy nominations, but no Emmys.

On April 2, 2006, Vicevich opened Sound Off Connecticut.

Vicevich also founded Vicevich Interactive, a small business based in Simsbury, Connecticut which specialized in producing multimedia content on VHS, CD-ROM, and the internet via Adobe Shockwave and Flash content. His products have earned him four national Telly awards for excellence in corporate video.

Today, in addition to the responsibilities of his show Sound Off Connecticut, Vicevich in the past, worked full-time as a financial advisor for The Advest Group, a consulting firm based in Hartford, Connecticut where he helps run their "Financial Education Solutions" program.

== Personal ==
Vicevich's sister, Barbara Vicevich, was a common guest on the radio show and podcast. She is known as the "Sound off Sister." Barbara Vicevich was previously Assistant United States Attorney for the Southern District of Florida, and special trial attorney for the Department of Justice, Criminal Division; a partner in the Florida law firm of Shutts & Bowen, and an adjunct professor at the University of Miami, School of Law.

Vicevich was married to author Jana Kandlova in Sept. 2020. He has a daughter and a son from a previous marriage. Vicevich has said on air that he suffers from lupus.
