= WWBT =

Television station in Richmond, Virginia

- Richmond–Petersburg, Virginia; United States
- City: Richmond, Virginia
- Channels: Digital: 10 (VHF); Virtual: 12
- Branding: 12 On Your Side; MeTV Richmond (on DT2)

Programming
- Affiliations: 12.1: NBC; for others, see § Subchannels

Ownership
- Owner: Gray Media; (Gray Television Licensee, LLC)
- Sister stations: WUPV; WRID-LD

History
- First air date: April 29, 1956
- Former call signs: WRVA-TV (1956–1968)
- Former channel numbers: Analog: 12 (VHF, 1956–2009); Digital: 54 (UHF, 2002–2009), 12 (VHF, 2009–2020)
- Former affiliations: CBS (1956–1960); ABC (1960–1965); The WB (secondary, 1999–2006)
- Call sign meaning: taken from sister TV station WBTV and former radio sister WBT (AM) in Charlotte, North Carolina

Technical information
- Licensing authority: FCC
- Facility ID: 30833
- ERP: 29 kW
- HAAT: 237 m (778 ft)
- Transmitter coordinates: 37°30′23″N 77°30′11″W
- Translator(s): WRID-LD 12.6 (36.3 UHF) Richmond

Links
- Public license information: Public file; LMS
- Website: www.12onyourside.com

WWBT (channel 12) is a television station in Richmond, Virginia, United States, affiliated with NBC. It is owned by Gray Media alongside Ashland-licensed CW affiliate WUPV (channel 65). The two stations share studios on Midlothian Turnpike (US 60) in Richmond, where WWBT's transmitter is also located.

WRID-LD (RF channel 36) operates as a low-power translator of WWBT's main 12.1 channel. WRID-LD uses virtual channel 12.6 for WWBT's programming.

WWBT is one of only a few stations in the country to have been affiliated with all three of the original major American television networks.

== History ==
In the 1950s, there was competition for the market's third television frequency. WTVR-TV had been on-the-air since 1948 while WXEX-TV (now WRIC-TV) had been on-the-air from Petersburg since 1955. The main competitors for the analog VHF channel 12 license were Larus and Brother Tobacco Company, owner of WRVA (AM 1140) and WRVB-FM (94.5, now WRVQ) and Richmond Newspapers, owner of WRNL and forerunner of Media General. Larus later merged its application with Neighborhood Theaters' Richmond Television Corporation, assuming controlling interest. Both applicants had good records and were financially qualified, but RTVC won the license since it did not own a newspaper. At the time, the Federal Communications Commission (FCC) was concerned about co-ownership of newspaper and broadcast outlets and preferred separation.

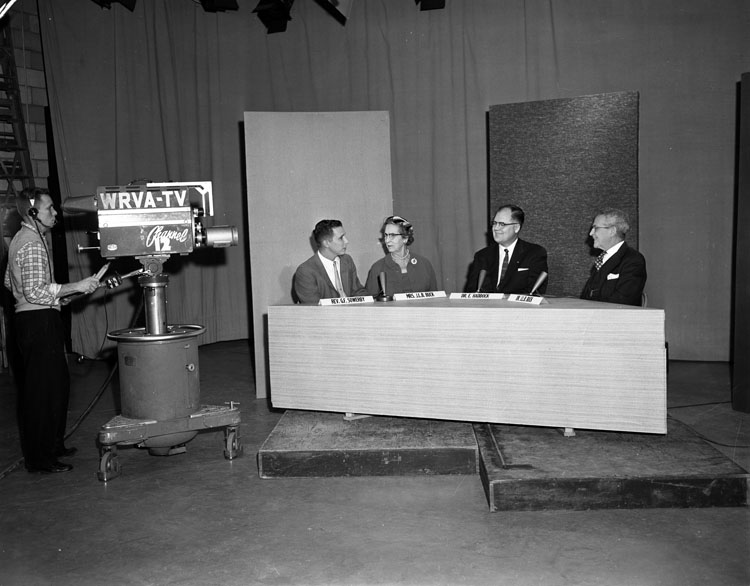
Religious broadcast on WRVA-TV, 1959

WRVA-TV signed-on for the first time on April 29, 1956, from a converted cow barn near the station's current facility. The studio and transmitter were located in what was then unincorporated Chesterfield County; the area was not annexed into the independent city of Richmond until the early 1960s. Although this area was still largely rural at the time, it was more than suitable for future expansion. Additionally, Chesterfield County officials had already greenlighted a tall tower for the site.

Channel 12 was initially a CBS affiliate due to WRVA's long affiliation with CBS Radio. That station was one of the broadcasting powerhouses of the South, but that success did not transfer to its television sister. For instance, WRVA radio's top anchorman took the same role with channel 12, but was fired within a year when the popularity he had generated over a decade on radio failed to transfer to television. Part of the problem was that Larus' desire to deliver a strong signal to all of Central Virginia resulted in a marginal signal in Richmond itself and several close-in suburbs. With channel 12 remaining stubbornly in third place, CBS opted to return to long-dominant WTVR in 1960. Since WXEX was already affiliated with NBC, WRVA was left with struggling ABC. Ratings improved in the next five years leading Larus to try to seek the NBC affiliation, a switch which occurred in 1965. Like its cross-town rival WTVR, it is one of the few stations in the country to have been a primary affiliate of all of the "Big Three" networks. From 1959 until 1969, it broadcast an in-house children's series, The Sailor Bob Show.

The station gradually came into its own, passing WXEX for third place. However, Larus ran the station on a shoestring. The studios had unpainted walls and concrete floors, while the offices were plain and painted in two shades of green. Much of the station's equipment was nearing the end of its useful life by the late 1960s.

In 1966, the family-owned Larus and Brothers (which had acquired full control of channel 12 in 1960) decided to split its various interests after longtime president William T. Reed died. However, the Larus and Reed families were very selective about potential buyers. They were only willing to sell to established broadcasters with a legacy of community service. Jefferson Standard Insurance Company of Greensboro, North Carolina, emerged as the winner for WRVA-TV. It would have bought the radio stations as well, but at the time, the FCC normally did not allow common ownership of two clear-channel stations with overlapping nighttime coverage. Larus-owned WRVA's nighttime signal had a significant overlap with the signal of Jefferson Standard flagship WBT in Charlotte. It soon became apparent that the FCC and Justice Department would frown on one company owning two Southern clear-channel stations that would have blanketed most of the eastern half of North America at night between them. As part of the application, Jefferson Standard requested a callsign change to the current WWBT, which occurred on November 28, 1968.

The new owners immediately went to work improving the station's look. Larus' spartan approach to running the station gave way to new equipment and a more modern studio. The news department, which had long operated in cramped space, was significantly expanded. The transmitter was reconfigured to improve reception closer in to Richmond. At the time of the sale, channel 12 was a solid runner-up to long-dominant WTVR. By the early 1980s, it was the highest-rated station in the market and one of the strongest NBC stations in the country. Also helping matters was NBC's rise in the ratings to become the #1 network as the 1980s went on. By this time, Jefferson Standard had changed its name to Jefferson-Pilot Corporation.

WWBT added a secondary WB affiliation in 1999, airing WB programming in late-night hours as well as adding Kids' WB programming on weekdays and Saturdays (including the Daytime WB block that replaced weekday cartoons in 2006) in addition to the TNBC block. This ended on August 31, 2006, in anticipation of The WB and UPN merging to form The CW; that network affiliated with former UPN affiliate WUPV. On October 10, 2005, Jefferson-Pilot announced a merger with Lincoln Financial Group. The sale became final on April 3, 2006, with the Jefferson-Pilot stations assuming the new corporate name of Lincoln Financial Media. On November 12, 2007, that company announced the sale of WWBT along with its two other television stations and Lincoln Financial Sports to Raycom Media for $583 million. Raycom already owned rival station WTVR. Since the FCC does not allow one company to own two of the four largest stations in a market, Raycom opted to keep the higher-rated WWBT and put WTVR on the market.

On June 24, 2008, the Sinclair Broadcast Group announced its agreement to purchase WTVR and sell Fox affiliate WRLH-TV. However, the United States Department of Justice, under provisions of a consent decree with Raycom Media, denied that company permission to sell WTVR to Sinclair in August 2008. As a result, Raycom sought and was eventually granted a temporary waiver for the purchase of WWBT to buy the company more time to find a suitable buyer for WTVR. The FCC approved the sale on March 25, 2008, and Raycom formally took control on April 1. WTVR was eventually traded to Local TV in exchange for Fox affiliate WBRC in Birmingham, Alabama.

=== Sale to Gray Television ===
On June 25, 2018, Atlanta-based Gray Television announced it had reached an agreement with Raycom to merge their respective broadcasting assets (consisting of Raycom's 63 existing owned-and/or-operated television stations, including WWBT and WUPV, the latter of which is being acquired outright, and Gray's 93 television stations) under Gray's corporate umbrella. The cash-and-stock merger transaction valued at $3.6 billion – in which Gray shareholders would acquire preferred stock currently held by Raycom – resulted in WWBT and WUPV becoming sister stations to CBS affiliate WDBJ and MyNetworkTV affiliate WZBJ in Roanoke, ABC affiliate WHSV-TV in Harrisonburg and CBS affiliate WCAV in Charlottesville, along with their low-power sister stations. The sale was approved on December 20, and was completed on January 2, 2019.

== News operation ==
Channel 12 started offering local newscasts on the second day of broadcasting in April 1956. News department personnel initially worked out of cramped offices. Early on, however, the station gained prominence for covering local events live, years before WTVR and WXEX/WRIC began doing so. In the early-1970s, renovations at the studios allowed the channel's personnel to be expanded. News operations were expanded again into a new addition to the facilities in 1978. In the late-1980s, WWBT received a comprehensive on-air upgrade featuring an updated news set and graphics package. It was the first station in Richmond to use a satellite broadcasting truck called "LiveStar 12" and a helicopter identified as "Sky 12".

On September 19, 1994, WWBT entered into a news share agreement with the areas Fox affiliate WRLH-TV (then owned by Abry Communications). This resulted in the area's first nightly prime time broadcast known as Fox News at 10. On January 8, 2001, the weeknight show was expanded to a full hour. Friday nights at 10:45, there is a fifteen-minute sports highlight program that airs called Fox First Sports. The prime time newscasts did not face competition until March 5, 2007, when WUPV launched a 35-minute weeknight show at 10 produced by WTVR. Weekend news on WUPV began October 20, 2007, and ended a year later on October 19. The final weeknight newscast on that channel was November 7. Three days later, WTVR management announced that the WUPV operation had been canceled due to high financial costs of production.

On March 23, 2007, "Sky 12" crash landed in a field in Rehoboth Beach, Delaware, after it appeared to hit power lines. Two of the four passengers were taken to a local hospital for evaluation. The helicopter was being used for non-news purposes by owner Heloair. WWBT became the first station in Richmond to air local newscasts in high definition on July 27, 2008. Unlike rival WTVR (who upgraded to high-definition newscasts two years later and whose video is in true high definition both in the studio and in the field), the field video shown on WWBT is still in 16:9 enhanced definition widescreen. However, the WRLH shows were not initially included in the upgrade because that station lacked a modern master control to receive the newscast in HD; this lasted until September 2012 when that station upgraded its master control so that the WWBT newscasts and some syndicated programming on that channel are now shown in HD. On December 17, WWBT eliminated twelve positions citing poor economic conditions. Included in the layoffs were Sports Director Ben Hamlin, news anchor Gene Lepley, along with Henrico and Hanover counties reporter Rob Richardson.

After NBC Weather Plus shut down on December 31, 2008, WWBT-DT2 switched to a local weather channel known as "NBC 12 First Warning Weather". It was replaced by MeTV on February 6, 2012. On January 5, 2009, WWBT began producing a weeknight newscast in high definition for WUPV called The CW News at 6:30 originating from a secondary set. The show goes up against national newscasts seen on the Big Three networks. In addition to operating a weather radar of its own known as "First Warning Live Doppler" at its studios, the station also uses a live feed from the National Weather Service radar based at the Local Forecast Office on US 460 (General Mahone Highway/South County Drive) in Wakefield next to the municipal airport.

On January 16, 2012, WRLH-TV launched a new one-hour weekday morning newscast at 7 a.m. called Fox Richmond Morning News. The show goes up against the national morning newscasts' first hour and is anchored by WWBT's morning news team.

On September 11, 2023, WWBT launched two new weekday newscasts at 3 p.m. and 7 p.m. The 3 p.m. newscast is titled First Look at 3 with the 7 p.m. show being called 12 On Your Side Tonight. With the new additions, WWBT produces more than 67 hours of local content each week.

=== Notable former on-air staff ===
- Campbell Brown – formerly at CNN
- Spencer Christian – now at KGO-TV in San Francisco
- Herb Clarke (1956–1958) – later longtime weatherman at WCAU-TV in Philadelphia
- Doug Hill (1978–1980) – later at WJLA-TV in Washington, D.C., (deceased)
- Ryan Nobles – now at NBC News

== Technical information ==
=== Subchannels ===
The station's signal is multiplexed:

Subchannels of WWBT
| Subchannel | Res. | Short name | Programming |
|---|---|---|---|
| 12.1 | 1080i | WWBT-DT | NBC |
| 12.2 | 480i | 12 MeTV | MeTV |
| 12.3 | 480i | H&I | Heroes & Icons |
| 12.4 | 480i | Mystery | Ion Mystery |
| 12.5 | 480i | Crime | True Crime Network |
| 65.1 | 1080i | WUPV-DT | The CW (WUPV) |

Broadcast on behalf of another station

Prior to February 6, 2012, WWBT aired a 24-hour local weather channel called "NBC 12 First Warning Weather Plus". It has since been replaced with MeTV.

WWBT-DT5 signed on as a Justice Network affiliate as of April 7, 2020.

On April 11, 2022, WWBT began hosting WUPV's 65.1 main channel, as a result of WUPV converting to ATSC 3.0; in turn, WUPV simulcasts WWBT in the ATSC 3.0 broadcast standard.

=== Analog-to-digital conversion ===
WWBT shut down its analog signal, over VHF channel 12, on June 12, 2009, the official date on which full-power television station in the United States transitioned from analog to digital broadcasts under federal mandate. The station's digital signal relocated from its pre-transition UHF channel 54, which was among the high band UHF channels (52-69) that were removed from broadcasting use as a result of the transition, to its analog-era VHF channel 12 for post-transition operations.

Following the switch, it applied to increase power to 26 kW stating in the application that more than 10,000 viewers complained of a sudden inability to receive the station's digital signal. The problem was especially pronounced with antennas located indoors. Although complaints came most prominently from certain heavily populated portions of the service area (including Western Richmond, Glen Allen, Mechanicsville, and Hanover), these reception problems were not limited to specific regions within WWBT's service area. This was also not unique to this station as viewers of other stations that switched to high-VHF band channels for post-transition operation have reported reception problems.
