= Ryan Nobles =

American journalist

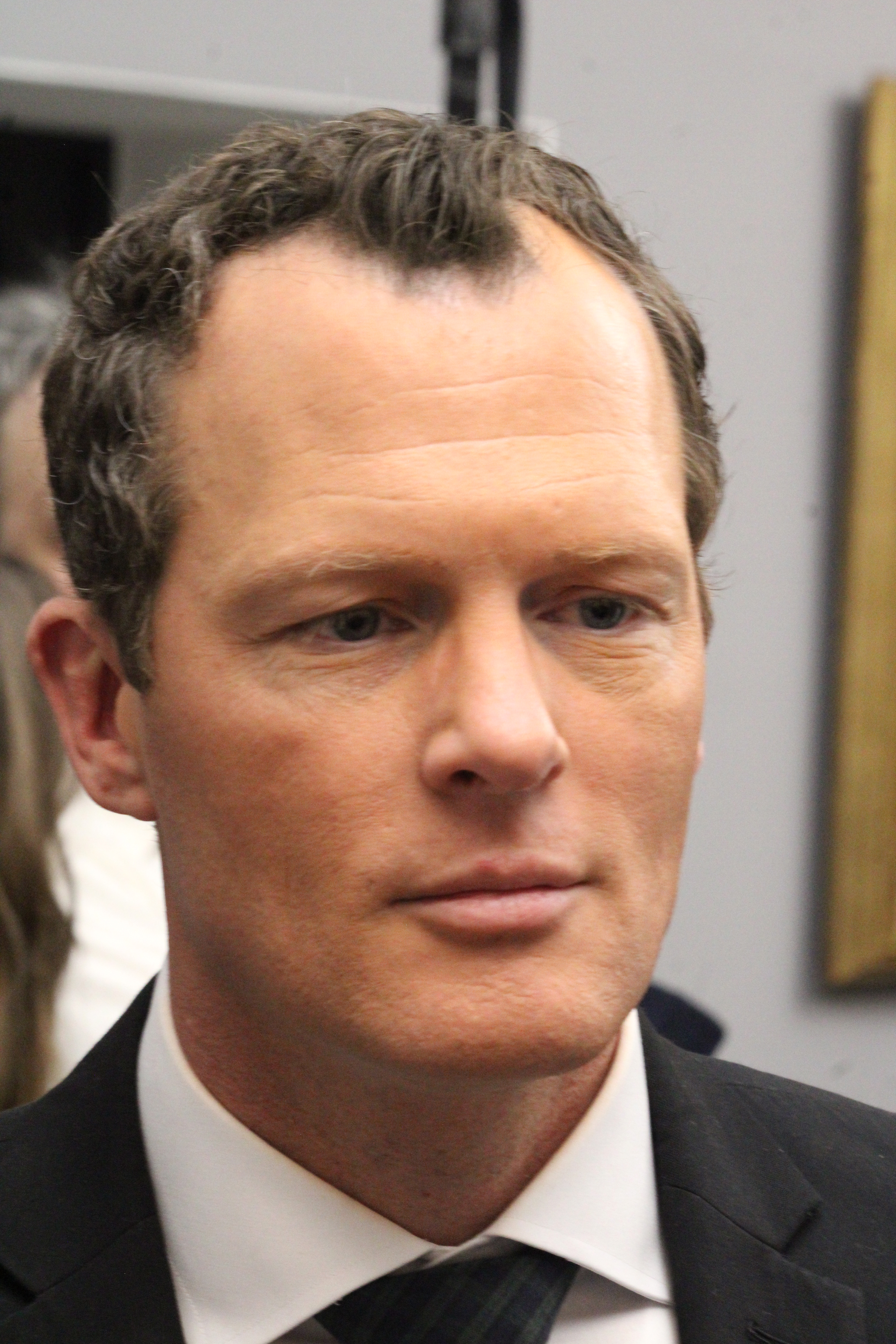
- Nobles in 2026
- Born: Ryan Austin Nobles; September 15, 1976 (age 49); New York, U.S.
- Education: SUNY Brockport (BA); SUNY Albany (MPA)
- Occupation: Journalist
- Known for: CNN Congressional Correspondent
- Spouse: Karey Kirkpatrick
- Website: Ryan Nobles on X

Ryan Austin Nobles (born September 15, 1976) is an American journalist. He was a Congressional correspondent for CNN, and also a fill-in anchor for CNN shows, until 2022, when he joined NBC News, where he continues to cover Congress, based in Washington, D.C. Previously, he worked for WWBT/NBC12, WKTV in Utica, New York, and WTEN in Albany, New York.

== Youth and education ==
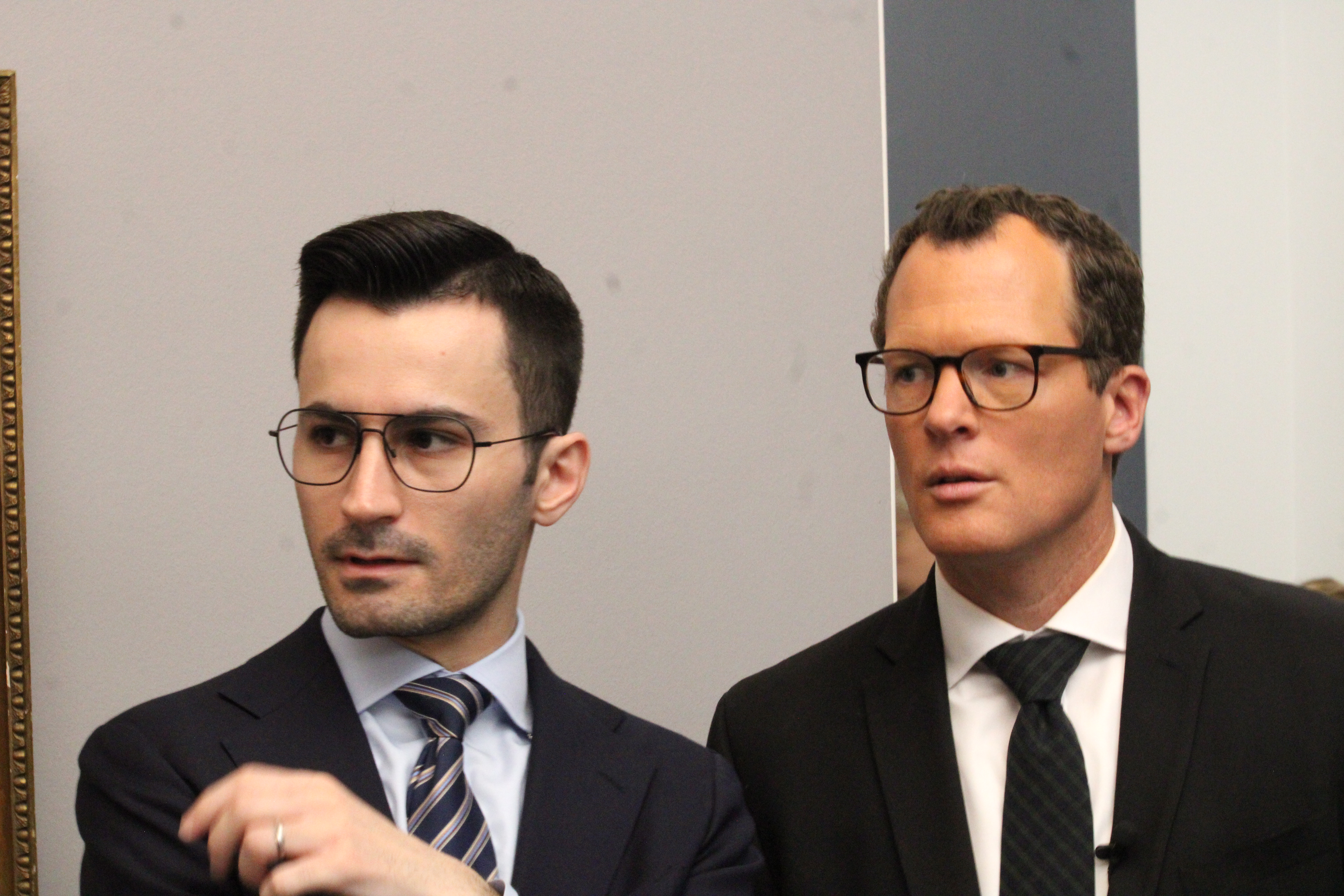
Nobles with Andrew Desiderio at Christiansborg in Copenhagen, Denmark, January 2026

Ryan Nobles attended the State University of New York College at Brockport from 1994 to 1998 where he graduated at the top of his class. He completed his Bachelor of Communication there. From 2003 to 2005 he attended the State University of New York at Albany where he completed a Master of Public Administration.
