= Mark Ovenden (sportscaster) =

American sportscaster

Mark Ovenden is an American sports news broadcaster based in South Dakota.

== Biography ==
Ovenden started his sportscasting career at WTVR-TV in Richmond, Virginia in 1976, as a journalism major at the University of Richmond. Afterward, Ovenden served as sportscaster for KSFY-TV and KELO-TV in Sioux Falls, South Dakota. He served as sports director for KDLT-TV from 1996 to 2020.

As of 2025, he hosts the daily sports talk show Calling All Sports, which broadcasts to 15 stations in South Dakota.

== Honors ==
Ovenden received the 2008 Tom Brokaw Award from the South Dakota Broadcasting Hall of Fame. In 2023, he was inducted into the South Dakota Sports Hall of Fame, which dubbed him "the most recognizable face of sports in South Dakota."
