= Seven Springs (Enfield, Virginia) =

Historic house in Virginia, United States

- U.S. National Register of Historic Places
- Virginia Landmarks Register
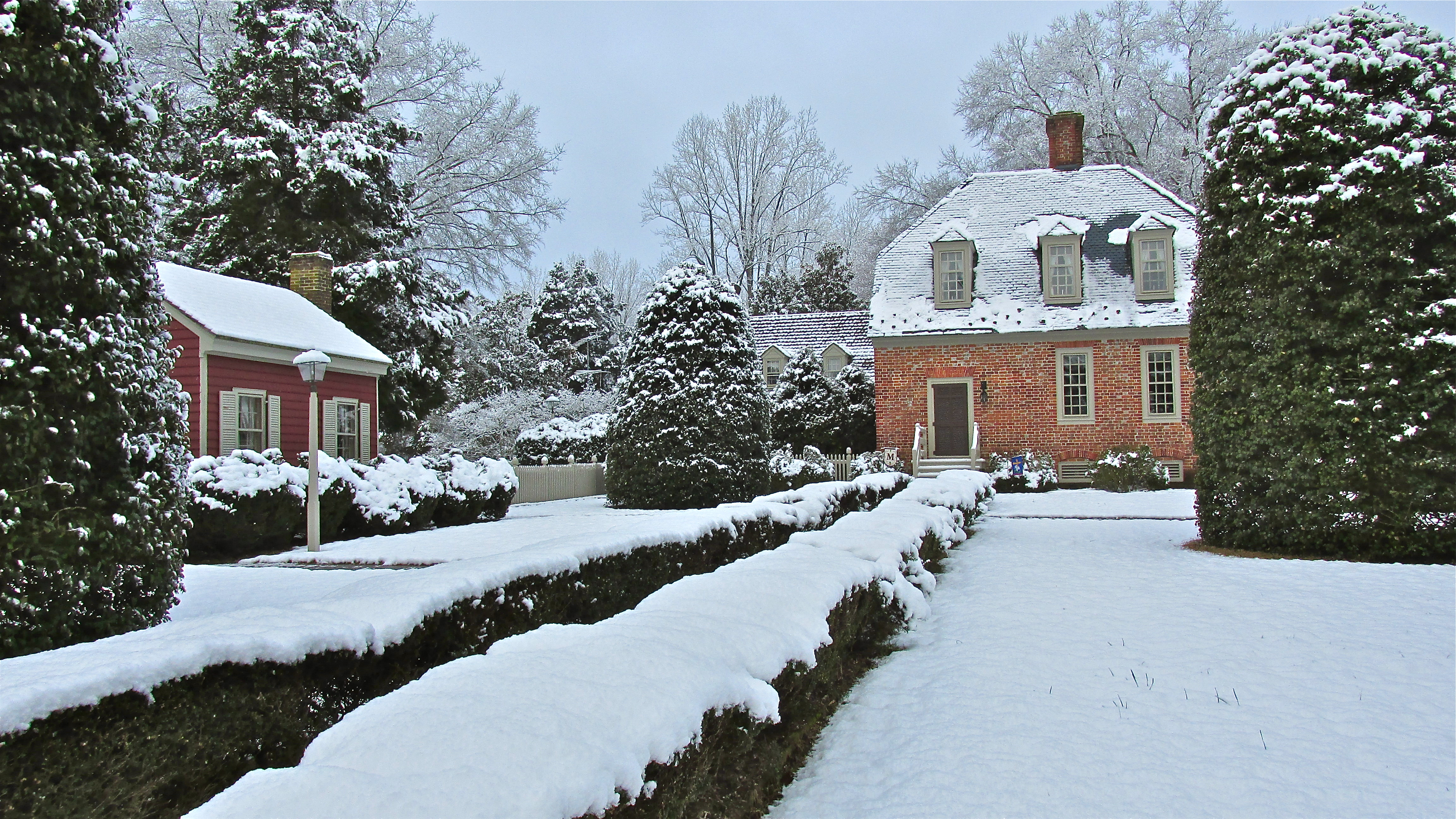
- Seven Springs, ca 1725, with caretakers house at left, ca 1840

- Location within Virginia Location within the United States
- Location: W of Enfield, near Enfield, Virginia
- Coordinates: 37°44′49″N 77°13′44″W
- Area: 27 acres (11 ha)
- Built: 1725
- Built by: Capt. George Dabney I
- Architectural style: Tidewater domestic
- NRHP reference No.: 80004194
- VLR No.: 050-0064

Significant dates
- Added to NRHP: May 6, 1980
- Designated VLR: December 21, 1976

Seven Springs, situated on the Mehixen Swamp near the Pamunkey River in upper King William County, Virginia, is an historic home. Set in rolling farm country near the town of Manquin, the property lies within a community rich in colonial, revolutionary, and civil war history.

== History ==
=== Early history ===
The brick manor house was owned, and likely built, for Captain George Dabney I, where he served as the first commission of the peace and later sheriff in 1715. The initial acreage was one of several land grants the family received from King William III in 1701.

The manor house is believed to have been built circa 1725–1740, and remained in the Dabney family until 1802, when ownership transferred to Captain Yancey Lipscomb. In 1822, it was sold to Thomas Broaddus Puller, where it stayed within the Puller and Atkinson families until 1940.

=== Restoration ===
After many years of neglect, the home was purchased by H.D. Moffett in 1967, who began its restoration. Mr. Harry H. Coon and his wife Alma of Glenview, Illinois, meticulously completed the restoration with guidance from the Colonial Williamsburg Foundation. Today, a compound of offices, barns and carriage houses join the original manor house and caretakers house to re-create the tight, campus-style layout typical of colonial farms.

== Architecture and significance ==
The small, three-bay manor house is an unusual example of eighteenth-century architecture, distinguished by its lack of symmetry. Its square footprint is divided into four unequal-sized rooms on the main floor, and five fireplaces on three floors feed a central T-shaped chimney.

While the interior was renovated in the early nineteenth century, many original features still exist. These include the triple-run walnut staircase, pine floors, chair rails, and doors, which feature both HL and foliated H hinges. The brick exterior, which was constructed in both Flemish and English bond, remains largely untouched. The half-hipped roof was originally built without the current dormers, which were added on subsequent renovations. The original cedar shingles have been replaced with slate.

The home is listed on the National and Virginia State Historic Registers.

== Current use ==
Purchased by the Hunnicutt family, of Richmond, VA, in February 2015, the estate is open to the public for the first time in its history, operating as a wedding and event venue and heritage livestock farm. The farm is home to one of the largest flocks of Hog Island sheep in America. The Hog Island sheep is not commonly used in modern agriculture, largely because of its endangered status and because more modern breeds have been bred for other characteristics, including maximum size and fleece yield. It is nevertheless considered important to preserve because of the insight it may give into American history and the traits it has that modern sheep might lack such as its toughness, foraging skill, efficient use of food, and easy lambing.

== Gallery ==
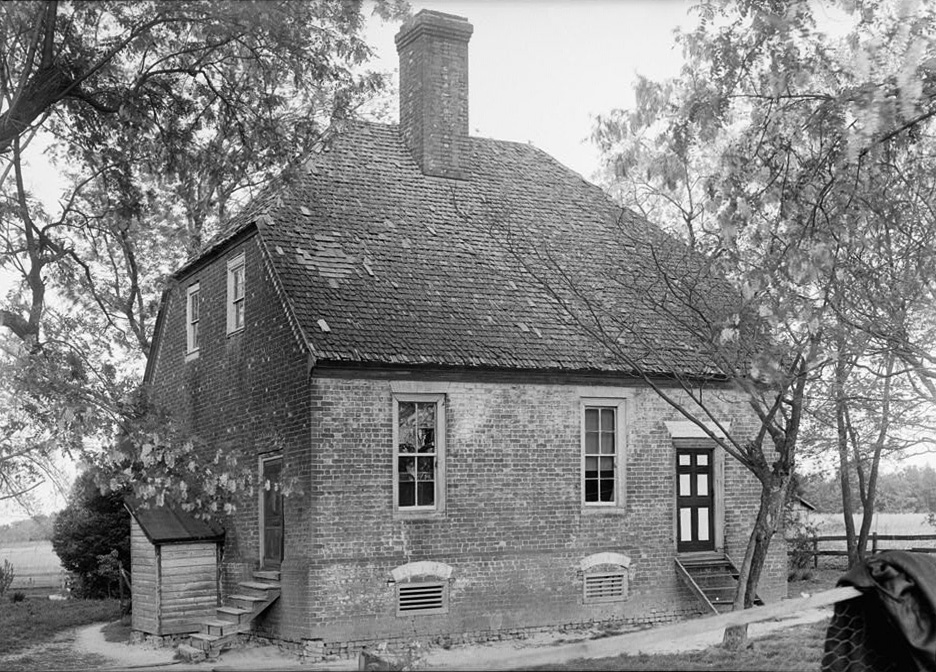
Rear view of Seven Springs, also known as Dabney House, King William County, Virginia, shown in 1940
