= Sailor Bob =

American children's television program

Sailor Bob is an American children's television program produced by WRVA in Richmond, Virginia that aired from 1959 to 1969.

== Early years ==
The program, built around Popeye cartoon segments, was hosted by "Sailor Bob" (Bob Griggs), a former cameraman for WRVA who had studied commercial art at the Richmond Professional Institute. Various puppets designed by Griggs himself, including Gilly Gull, Squeeky Mouse, Captain Paddles, Sparkey and Mr. Bluebird, starred alongside the title sailor. When he was not conversing with these puppets or showing Popeye cartoons, "Sailor Bob" would often draw his own cartoons on camera for the audience. Although the program's broadcast was confined to the central Virginia area, Sailor Bob built a substantial viewership, receiving as many as 8,000 fan letters per month.

In 2011, the show was the subject of a 90-minute documentary film, The Sailor Bob Story. The film debuted at the Byrd Theatre in Richmond on January 11, 2011, and was later broadcast on the local PBS stations WCVE-TV and WHTJ.

Griggs died on February 20, 2019.
