= WRLH-TV =

Television station in Richmond, Virginia

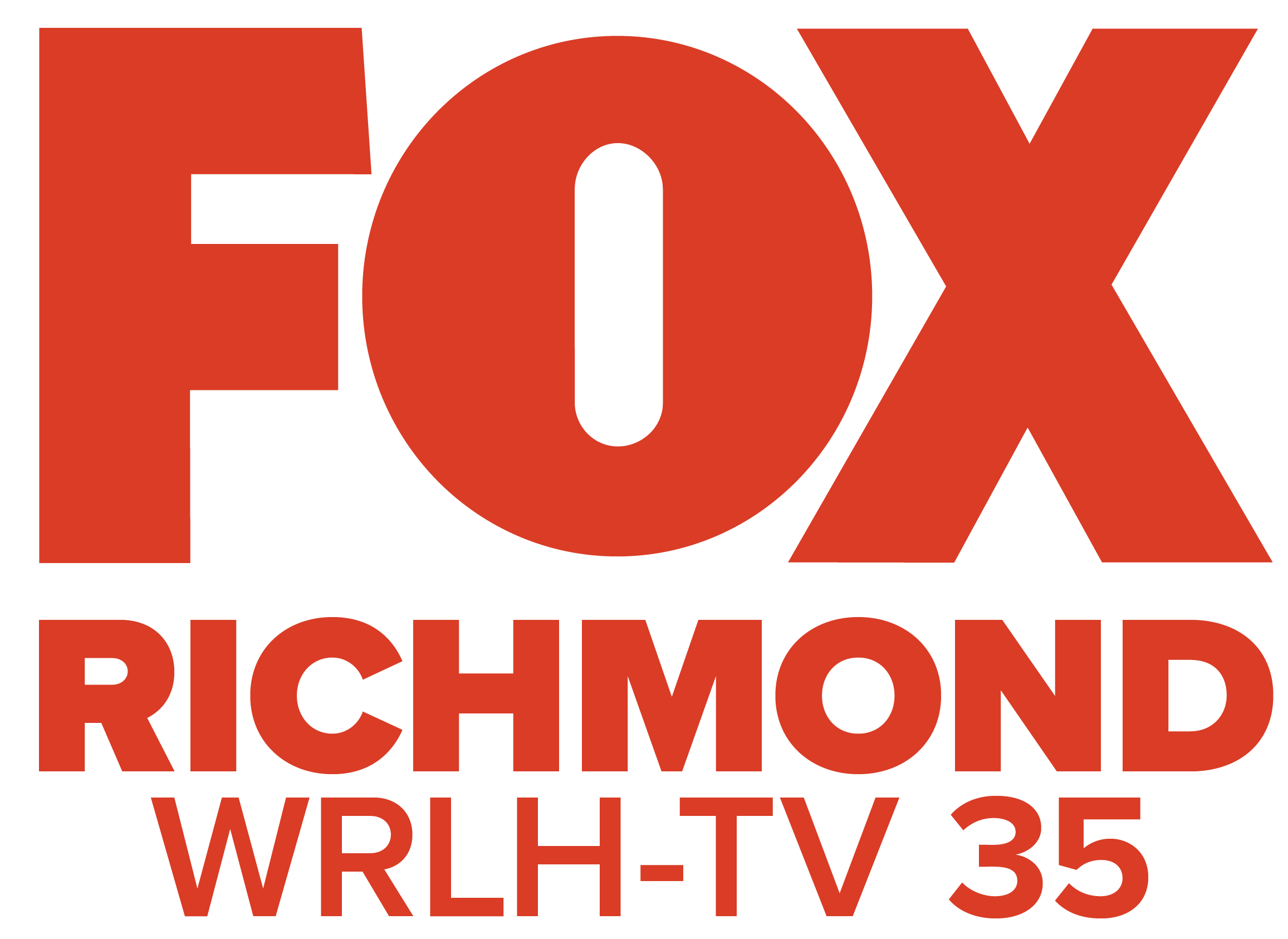

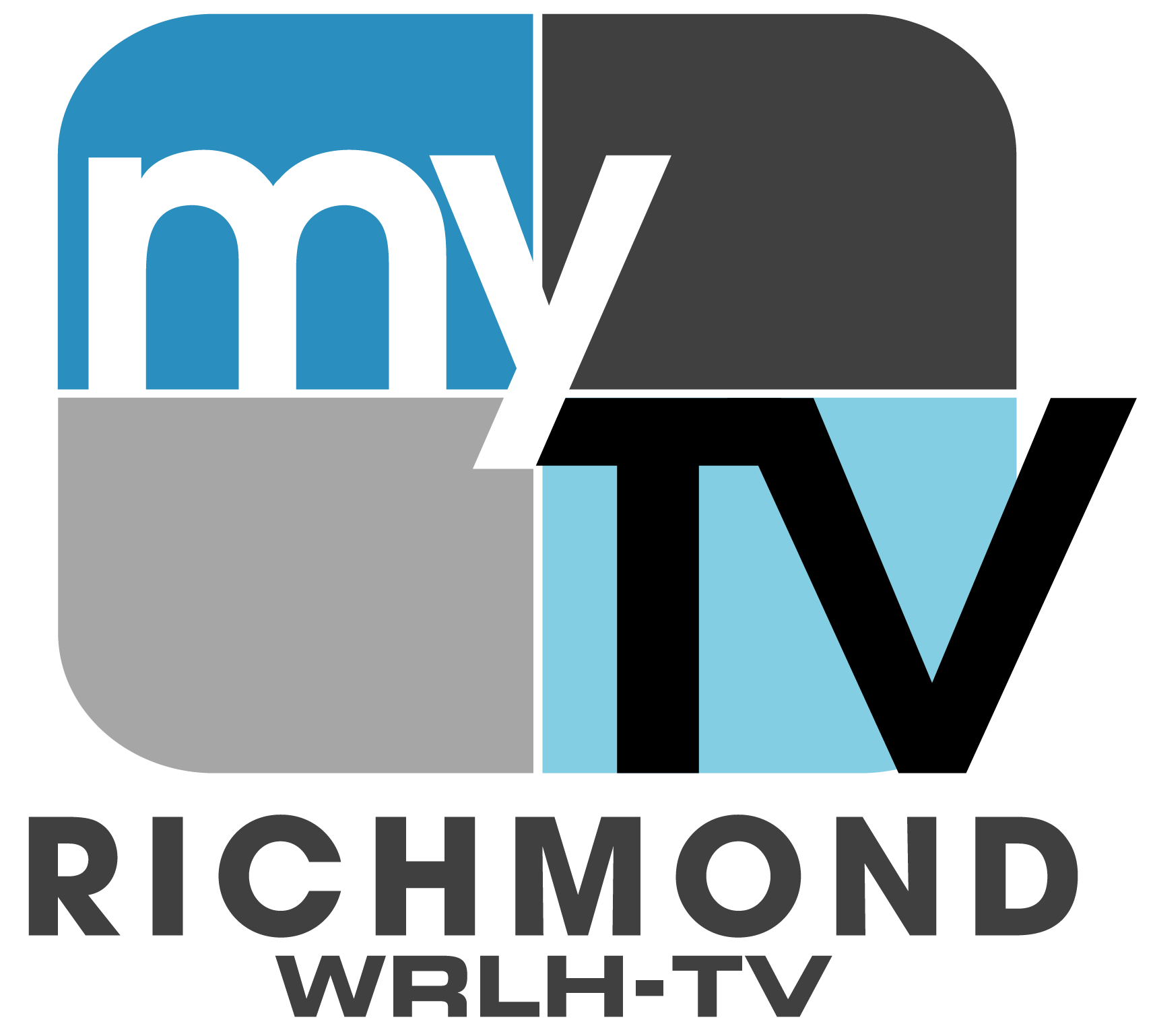
- Richmond–Petersburg, Virginia; United States
- Channels: Digital: 24 (UHF); Virtual: 35
- Branding: Fox Richmond; MyTV Richmond (35.2)

Programming
- Affiliations: 35.1: Fox; 35.2: Roar / MyNetworkTV; for others, see § Subchannels

Ownership
- Owner: Sinclair Broadcast Group; (WRLH Licensee, LLC)

History
- Founded: October 20, 1980
- First air date: February 20, 1982
- Former channel numbers: Analog: 35 (UHF, 1982–2009); Digital: 26 (UHF, 2004–2019)
- Former affiliations: Independent (1982–1986); UPN (secondary, 1995–1997)
- Call sign meaning: Richmond, Loving and Hudson

Technical information
- Licensing authority: FCC
- Facility ID: 412
- ERP: 1,000 kW
- HAAT: 327.7 m (1,075 ft)
- Transmitter coordinates: 37°30′45.6″N 77°36′4.8″W

Links
- Public license information: Public file; LMS
- Website: foxrichmond.com; mytvrichmond.com

WRLH-TV (channel 35), branded as Fox Richmond, is a television station in Richmond, Virginia, United States, affiliated with the Fox network. Owned by Sinclair Broadcast Group, it has studios on Westmoreland Street in the North Side area of Richmond, and its transmitter is located at Bon Air near the studios of PBS member stations WCVE-TV and WCVW.

WRLH-TV was the third station owned by the TVX Broadcast Group when it went on the air in 1982. It was the first independent station in the Richmond market; TVX sold it in 1985, marking the first of five changes of ownership in four years. During that time, the station became Richmond's Fox affiliate when the network launched in 1986. In 1988, Act III Broadcasting acquired WRLH-TV and simultaneously purchased the programming inventory of its only competitor, WVRN-TV, which then shut down for good. Sinclair has owned WRLH-TV since 1998. NBC affiliate WWBT produces 10 p.m. and 7 a.m. newscasts for air on WRLH-TV.

== History ==
=== Early history ===
At the start of 1978, two groups applied to the Federal Communications Commission (FCC) for permission to build a television station on channel 35. One was Neighborhood Communications Corporation, a subsidiary of Richmond movie theater operator Neighborhood Theaters, and the other was Christian Broadcasting Network (CBN) of Portsmouth. Whichever group won out would get to build channel 35 on a new tower being built by WCVE–WCVW. Both proposed to build something lacking in Richmond at that time—an independent station.

CBN amended its application to specify channel 63 in early 1980, which cleared the way for the FCC to award channel 35 to Neighborhood Communications in May 1980. Months later, after Neighborhood decided to concentrate on the movie theater business, the company assigned the permit to Television Corporation of Richmond (the parent of which was the Television Corporation Stations or TVX). Among the owners were former Richmonder Gene Loving; longtime Richmond radio man Harvey Hudson (also an executive with Neighborhood); and Tim McDonald, president and general manager of WTVZ in Norfolk. (Another notable owner of TVX was Dick Davis.) The call letters were changed from WRHP-TV to WRLH-TV (Richmond, Loving and Hudson), and construction got underway in mid-1981.

After a series of delays owing to bad weather, WRLH-TV began broadcasting on February 20, 1982. This made it the third TVX station, after WTVZ and WJTM-TV in Winston-Salem, North Carolina. Like most independents, it initially offered a format consisting of cartoons, sitcoms, movies, sports, and some religious programs. It was the most successful of TVX Broadcast Group's first three stations. Unlike in Norfolk, where CBN owned WYAH-TV, WRLH-TV was the only independent in Richmond. A year after starting up, it already accounted for eight percent of the total TV audience in Richmond. Meanwhile, CBN's channel 63 station permit was sold to National Capital Christian Broadcasting in 1982, and the station began broadcasting as WTLL in November 1984, though it devoted half of its broadcast day to religious programs.

=== Three sales in three years ===
In January 1985, TVX agreed to sell WRLH-TV to the A. S. Abell Company of Baltimore (publisher of that city's Sun) in 1985 for $14.4 million, making it TVX's first ever divestiture. The sale allowed TVX to clear all of its bank debts. Abell sent along some equipment from its only other television station, Baltimore's WMAR-TV, and aimed to improve channel 35's on-air look.

Abell soon exited the broadcasting and publishing businesses. In 1986, the Times Mirror Company agreed to acquire the Sun, WMAR-TV, and WRLH-TV for $600 million. Times Mirror could not keep both the Sun and the Baltimore television station, a grandfathered combination no longer permissible under newspaper-broadcast cross-ownership rules. In selling WMAR-TV, it also sold WRLH-TV to the Gillett Group of Nashville, Tennessee.

Two key developments also marked 1986 for channel 35. The first occurred with channel 63 being sold by National Capital Christian Broadcasting to Sudbrink Broadcasting, which relaunched it as a full-time secular station, WVRN-TV. WRLH-TV also affiliated with the then-new Fox network in October.

In 1987, Gillett conducted a buyout of Storer Communications. It now had 14 stations, more than the limit of 12 then in place. Five of the smaller Gillett stations, including WRLH-TV, were spun off to a new company, Busse Broadcasting Corporation, which was run by and named for the former general manager of WEAU-TV in Eau Claire, Wisconsin, one of the stations included in the transaction. Busse Broadcasting was originally announced to be owned by Lawrence A. Busse and a trust set up for George N. Gillett Jr.'s children; the FCC rejected complaints from members of Congress after Gillett himself bought non-voting stock in the company. By February 1988, WVRN-TV had four percent of total viewership in the market, while WRLH-TV had five percent.

=== Act III ownership and consolidation with WVRN-TV ===
Act III Broadcasting, an Atlanta-based company and subsidiary of Norman Lear–owned Act III Communications, acquired WRLH-TV from Busse Broadcasting in 1988—its fifth sale in four years. Unlike Busse, Act III specialized in the ownership of independent stations. Close on the sale of WRLH-TV to Act III being announced, rumors began to circulate that the company was talking with Sudbrink Broadcasting about buying out the programming of WVRN-TV. The rumors were categorically denied by WVRN-TV's general manager, who pointed out that while there had been discussions, the station had just bought new programs for the fall 1988 television season.

On September 15, 1988, Act III completed its purchase of WRLH-TV. That afternoon, it also closed on a purchase of WVRN-TV's programming, some of its cameras and other equipment, and channel 63 left the air for good at 2 p.m. Act III president Bert Ellis credited WVRN-TV with making better programming decisions than WRLH-TV, despite the latter generating more revenue and ratings. Its programs were combined into WRLH-TV's lineup, and its license was surrendered to the FCC. Under Act III, WRLH continued to show ratings growth, bolstered by an expanding and more popular program offering from the Fox network. It also served as the secondary affiliate of UPN in Richmond from 1995 to 1997, when then-WB affiliate WAWB changed to UPN as WUPV.

=== Sullivan and Sinclair ownership ===
In October 1995, Sullivan Broadcasting was formed by ABRY Partners and former Clear Channel Television president Dan Sullivan to run the Act III stations, which ABRY had purchased earlier that year for $500 million. Three years later, Sinclair Broadcast Group acquired Sullivan Broadcasting, including WRLH-TV.

WRLH-TV started a subchannel, "MyTV Richmond", in 2006 to serve as Richmond's MyNetworkTV affiliate.

Sinclair twice attempted to acquire WTVR-TV (channel 6), Richmond's CBS affiliate, which would have required a divestiture of WRLH-TV. The first time was in 2008, when Raycom Media put it up for sale in order to acquire Lincoln Financial Media and NBC affiliate WWBT; Sinclair would have sold WRLH-TV to Carma Broadcasting while continuing to provide it sales and non-programming services. However, the United States Department of Justice, as part of a consent decree in the Lincoln Financial Media transaction, denied Raycom permission to sell WTVR to Sinclair and ordered it to find another buyer. Sinclair's second attempt to acquire WTVR-TV came as part of its $3.9 billion to purchase Tribune Media in 2017. Sinclair intended to keep WTVR-TV and designated WRLH-TV and eight other stations to be sold to Standard Media Group. However, the transaction was designated in July 2018 for hearing by an FCC administrative law judge, and Tribune moved to terminate the deal in August 2018.

== Newscasts ==
On September 19, 1994, NBC affiliate WWBT (then owned by the Jefferson-Pilot Corporation) began producing a nightly prime time newscast for WRLH-TV, the Fox 35 News at 10, from its Richmond studios. This was the first locally produced 10 p.m. newscast in Richmond. It was the second partnership between Jefferson-Pilot and Act III, as Act III's Fox affiliate in Charleston, South Carolina, already aired a newscast from the Jefferson-Pilot station there. On January 8, 2001, the weeknight broadcast was expanded to an hour. The newscast briefly had competition from WUPV, which aired a 10 p.m. newscast produced by WTVR-TV between 2007 and 2008.

On January 16, 2012, WRLH launched an hour-long extension of WWBT's weekday morning news from 7 to 8 a.m., Fox Richmond Morning News, airing opposite national morning shows.

== Technical information ==
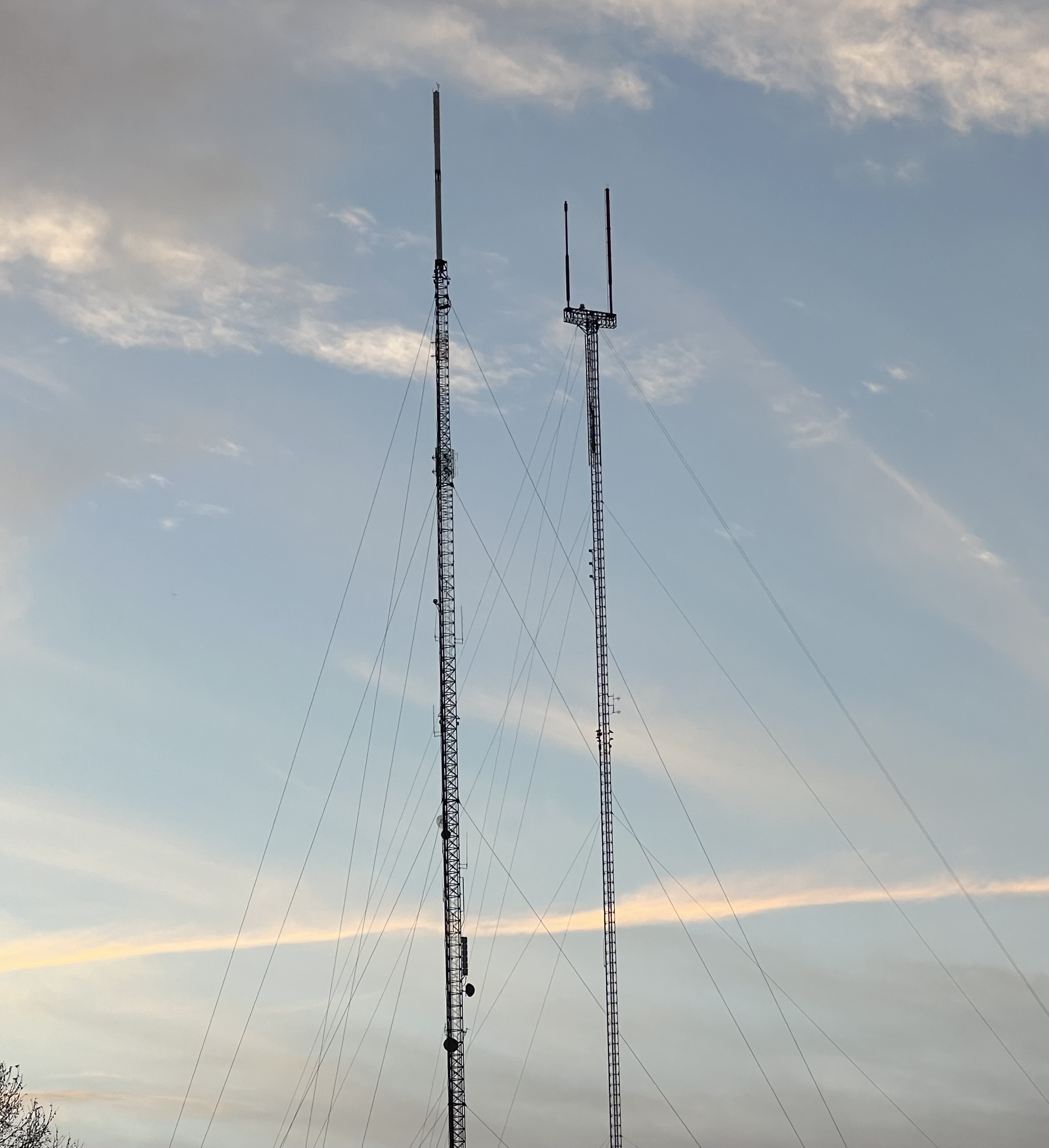
WRLH is broadcast from the tower at left at the VPM facilities in Richmond.

=== Subchannels ===
The station's signal is multiplexed:

Subchannels of WRLH-TV
Subchannel	Res.	Short name	Programming
35.1	720p	FOX	Fox
35.2	480i	ROAR	Roar / MyNetworkTV
35.3	480i	Comet	Comet
35.4	480i	Charge!	Charge!
35.5	480i	TheNest	The Nest
65.3	480i	Grit	Grit (WUPV-DT3)

Broadcast on behalf of another station

On April 11, 2022, WRLH-TV began hosting WUPV's 65.3 subchannel, as a result of WUPV converting to ATSC 3.0 (NextGen TV); in turn, WUPV simulcasts WRLH-TV in the ATSC 3.0 broadcast standard.

=== Analog-to-digital conversion ===
WRLH-TV shut down its analog signal, over UHF channel 35, on February 17, 2009, the original target date on which full-power television stations in the United States were to transition from analog to digital broadcasts under federal mandate (which was later pushed back to June 12, 2009). This made it the only station in the market to switch early. The station's digital signal remained on its pre-transition UHF channel 26, using virtual channel 35. WRLH relocated its signal from channel 26 to channel 24 on September 6, 2019, as a result of the 2016 United States wireless spectrum auction.
