= Seven Springs (restaurant) =

2001–2020 South Korean restaurant chain

- Industry: Restaurants
- Founded: South Korea (2001)
- Defunct: 2020
- Headquarters: Seoul, South Korea
- Number of locations: 25 stores (2015)
- Website: Official website

Seven Springs (Korean: 세븐스프링스) was a restaurant chain based in South Korea owned by the Samyang Group.

In 2014, the chain had over 25 retail stores in South Korea. However, by 2019, only four locations remained, and Samyang Group reported an operating loss of ₩2,200,000,000 that year. On April 17, 2020, Samyang Group announced that they would withdraw from the restaurant business, closing all remaining Seven Springs locations by the end of that month.
