= Enfield, Virginia =

Unincorporated community in Virginia, United States

- Unincorporated community
- Location within Virginia and the United States Enfield (the United States)
- Coordinates: 37°44′44″N 77°13′07″W
- Country: United States
- State: Virginia
- County: King William
- Time zone: UTC−5 (Eastern (EST))
  - Summer (DST): UTC−4 (EDT)

Enfield is an unincorporated community in King William County, Virginia, United States.

Seven Springs was listed on the National Register of Historic Places in 1978.
