= WTKR =

Television station in Norfolk, Virginia

- Norfolk, Virginia; United States
- Channels: Digital: 16 (UHF); Virtual: 3
- Branding: WTKR News 3

Programming
- Affiliations: 3.1: CBS; for others, see § Subchannels

Ownership
- Owner: E. W. Scripps Company; (Scripps Broadcasting Holdings LLC)
- Sister stations: WGNT

History
- First air date: April 2, 1950
- Former call signs: WTAR-TV (1950–1981)
- Former channel numbers: Analog: 4 (VHF, 1950–1954), 3 (VHF, 1954–2009); Digital: 40 (UHF, 2002–2020)
- Former affiliations: NBC (1950–1953); CBS (secondary, 1950–1953); DuMont (secondary, 1950–1955); ABC (secondary, 1950–1957)
- Call sign meaning: Tidewater/Knight-Ridder (owner 1981–1985)

Technical information
- Licensing authority: FCC
- Facility ID: 47401
- ERP: 610 kW
- HAAT: 375 m (1,230 ft)
- Transmitter coordinates: 36°48′31.8″N 76°30′11.3″W

Links
- Public license information: Public file; LMS
- Website: wtkr.com

WTKR (channel 3) is a television station licensed to Norfolk, Virginia, United States, serving the Hampton Roads area as an affiliate of CBS. It is owned by the E. W. Scripps Company alongside Portsmouth-licensed WGNT (channel 27), an independent station. The two stations share studios on Boush Street near downtown Norfolk; WTKR's transmitter is located in Suffolk, Virginia.

The station was founded as WTAR-TV by radio station WTAR and began broadcasting on April 2, 1950; it aired on channel 4 until it moved to channel 3 in 1954. It was the only television station in Hampton Roads for its first three years, having been one of the last new station permits awarded before a years-long freeze on station grants by the Federal Communications Commission, and dominated local news ratings for more than 30 years. The station's ownership, which also included The Virginian-Pilot and Ledger-Star newspapers, reorganized as Landmark Communications in 1967.

In 1969, a group of Norfolk lawyers challenged the broadcast license of WTAR-TV in a decade-long dispute that involved several issues, including business dealings of the co-owned Norfolk newspapers and cross-ownership of newspapers and TV stations. The dispute ended in 1979 with a commitment by Landmark to sell the television station within two years. In 1981, Knight-Ridder acquired the station and changed the call sign to WTKR. During Knight-Ridder's ownership, the station's news ratings declined; though they recovered for some time under Narragansett Television in the late 1980s and early 1990s, they fell again during the 12-year ownership tenure of The New York Times Company.

Local TV LLC acquired The New York Times Company's television stations, including WTKR, in 2007. The general manager launched a push to "Take Norfolk Back"; Local TV acquired WGNT in 2010, and WTKR increased its share of market advertising revenue and its news ratings. When the Tribune Company acquired Local TV LLC in 2013, the license was transferred to another company, Dreamcatcher Broadcasting, to satisfy cross-ownership concerns; however, Tribune continued providing services to the station. Scripps purchased WTKR and WGNT in 2019 as part of divestitures from Tribune's sale to Nexstar Media Group. The WTKR newsroom produces 46 hours a week of news programs for the two stations.

== History ==
=== Early history ===
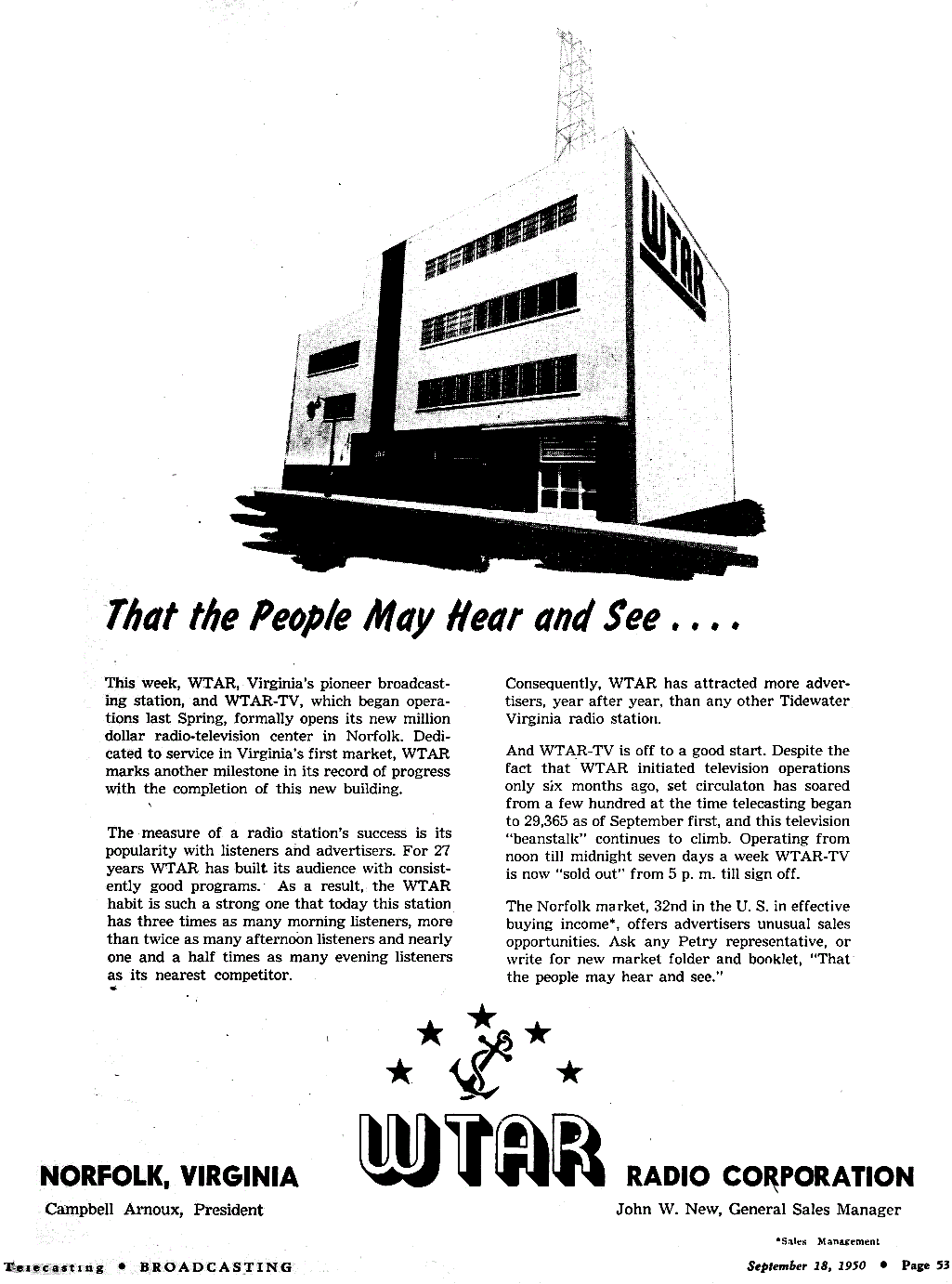
1950 advertisement for the new facility to be occupied by WTAR and recently started WTAR-TV

On April 21, 1948, the WTAR Radio Corporation—owner of WTAR (790 AM) and associated with Norfolk's two daily newspapers, The Virginian-Pilot and the Norfolk Ledger-Dispatch—applied to the Federal Communications Commission (FCC) for a construction permit to build a new television station on channel 4 in Norfolk. The FCC made a conditional grant to WTAR on August 18, 1948; that day, the station announced it would build a new radio and television complex to house its radio operations and the new channel 4. The station divulged more details of the project the next month, coinciding with the 25th anniversary of WTAR radio: it would be a three-story facility encompassing a television studio, a theater with seating for 175, and a 400 feet (120 m) transmitter tower for the TV station. The FCC upgraded the conditional grant to a regular grant on October 7; days before, the commission imposed a freeze on new TV station grants to sort out possible changes to television broadcast standards.

As construction proceeded on the Boush Street facility, in July 1949, work began on the transmitter tower at the site. WTAR-TV also secured a primary affiliation with NBC; network programming would arrive in Norfolk via a microwave transmission system from Richmond, which was on the coaxial cable network for the broadcast of network TV shows. A mobile unit for televising programs outside the studio arrived in Norfolk in December, while the station began broadcasting a test pattern daily on March 1, 1950.

WTAR-TV formally began broadcasting on April 2, 1950, as the first television station in southeastern Virginia, broadcasting to 600 area TV sets. That evening, 1,800 people filled the Center Theater for the station's inaugural program. Nineteen local programs, ranging from children's shows to an all-Black variety show, were among channel 4's first local productions. In addition to NBC, the station aired programs from the other three television networks of the day: CBS, ABC, and DuMont, channel 4 joining the latter a month and a half after it started. WTAR-TV was the first station to use the Boush Street facility; WTAR radio moved in June 1950, and the building was not dedicated until September. By the station's first anniversary, WTAR-TV was airing 30 local shows, representing ten hours of output a week, and more than half the top TV shows in the country.

In April 1952, the FCC lifted the freeze after three and a half years with major changes to television allocations, including the addition of ultra high frequency (UHF) channels to the existing 12 in the very high frequency (VHF) band and new station spacing requirements. In doing so, it made a total of 30 changes to the channels of existing stations, including WTAR-TV, which would be moved from channel 4 to channel 3. WTAR-TV was successful in rebuffing the originally proposed relocation to channel 8 or 12, both high-band VHF channels that would have required additional changes in transmitter equipment; instead, it received channel 3, which had originally been allocated to Richmond. However, WTAR-TV would not make the channel switch for more than two years, as it paired the channel change with the installation of a new, 1,049 feet (320 m) tower and maximum-power transmitter facility near Driver. The new tower was touted as the highest man-made structure in Virginia. The channel switch took place on May 1, 1954. On that day, the station held a beauty pageant at the transmitter site, crowning a North Carolina woman "Miss WTAR-TV"; the Norfolk Ledger-Dispatch called the new tower the tallest maypole in the world.

The end of the freeze also unblocked the development of other TV stations in the Hampton Roads area surrounding Norfolk. By October 1952, there were eight applications on file with the FCC for four channels, both VHF and UHF, in Norfolk, Portsmouth, and Newport News. With station construction in the pipeline, in May 1953, the WTAR Radio Corporation opted to change its radio and TV stations to primary CBS affiliates beginning in September. NBC signed in June with a new-to-air station in Hampton, WVEC-TV (then channel 15), which began broadcasting in September. ABC followed suit in September and affiliated with the new WTOV-TV (channel 27) in Portsmouth. However, ABC and DuMont continued to also be affiliated with WTAR-TV. DuMont ceased its existence as a network in 1955, while a full-time ABC affiliate debuted when WAVY-TV signed on channel 10 in 1957.

In 1967, Norfolk-Portsmouth Newspapers—which owned the two Norfolk daily newspapers, the WTAR stations, and WFMY-TV in Greensboro, North Carolina, among other holdings—was reorganized as Landmark Communications.

=== License challenge ===
In 1969, WTAR-TV's broadcast license came up for renewal at the FCC. Three members of a Norfolk law firm—Gordon E. Campbell, Wayne Lustig, and I. L. Hancock—formed the Hampton Roads Television Corporation and proceeded to file a competing application for a license to broadcast on channel 3. At the time, several incumbent broadcasters in other markets across the U.S. were facing competing "strike" applications for their channels. In January 1970, the FCC designated WTAR-TV's renewal and Hampton Roads Television's application for comparative hearing. Hampton Roads Television also challenged a new FCC policy on comparative hearings which resulted in an appeals court ruling and a redesignation of the WTAR-TV license challenge hearing.

In 1973, FCC administrative law judge David Kraushaar recommended that the commission renew WTAR-TV's license. However, on appeal, the FCC Broadcast Bureau asked for reconsideration, citing lawsuits against Landmark and related companies in Virginia concerning the alleged publication of false information about a failing savings and loan whose director was one of Landmark's officers. It believed this issue called the company's character into question. In August 1974, the FCC remanded the case to the administrative law judge after Hampton Roads Television claimed that Landmark intentionally waited to make a change in senior management until after the initial decision. Kraushaar ruled in January 1975, finding the management change had no effect on his comparative selection of WTAR-TV over Hampton Roads Television. However, the commission reopened the comparative hearing and added a character issue against Landmark.

In 1979, Landmark reached an agreement with Hampton Roads Television. It reimbursed the challengers for their expenses in exchange for them dropping the ten-year-old challenge. Additionally, the company committed to sell WTAR-TV within two years, retaining ownership of the Norfolk newspapers and radio stations. In announcing the agreement, Landmark chairman Frank Batten cited FCC policy encouraging the unwinding of situations where newspapers and TV stations in the same market were co-owned as well as the drain of continued litigation in the license challenge; Lustig and Campbell noted they were less interested in running a TV station than ten years prior and that their law practice had expanded. Landmark initially reached an agreement with Scripps-Howard Broadcasting in April 1980 to swap WTAR-TV for WMC-TV in Memphis, Tennessee. Like Landmark in Norfolk, Scripps-Howard was looking to reduce its cross-ownership load in Memphis, where it owned AM and FM radio stations and the city's two daily newspapers. Two months later, the deal fell apart for economic reasons; Landmark, which was required to dispose of WTAR-TV by March 1, 1981, put the station on the market.

=== Knight-Ridder and Narragansett ownership ===
In August 1980, Landmark entered into an agreement with Knight-Ridder to purchase WTAR-TV for $48.3 million, which was higher than what Landmark was reportedly seeking for the station. Knight-Ridder took over control of channel 3 on March 3, 1981, and changed the call sign to WTKR.

By 1988, Knight-Ridder owned eight stations. That October, the company announced its intent to sell its station group to reduce a $929 million debt load and finance a $353 million acquisition of online information provider Dialog Information Services. Narragansett Television acquired WTKR and WPRI-TV in Providence, Rhode Island, from Knight-Ridder on June 30, 1989, for $150 million.

Narragansett put the two stations on the market in late 1994; the company had not intended to sell but began taking offers after receiving several unsolicited expressions of interest. Narragansett chairman Jonathan Nelson stated, "[W]e feel we have a fiduciary responsibility to respond to inquiries from well-qualified prospective buyers." The New York Times Company acquired WTKR in 1995, making it the company's largest-market television property.

=== Local TV and Dreamcatcher/Tribune ownership ===
On January 4, 2007, The New York Times Company sold WTKR and its eight sister television stations to Local TV LLC, a holding company operated by private equity firm Oak Hill Capital Partners, for $530 million; the sale was finalized on May 7. Local TV LLC shared broadcast group management with the Tribune Company, by way of The Other Company, run by Tribune executive Randy Michaels. During this time, in 2010, Local TV LLC acquired WGNT (channel 27), the local affiliate of The CW, from the CBS Television Stations group. The station also increased its share of Hampton Roads-market TV advertising revenue by five percentage points from 2008 to 2012.

On July 1, 2013, Local TV announced that its 19 stations would be acquired by the Tribune Company, the owner of the Daily Press in Newport News, for $2.75 billion; Since this would conflict with FCC regulations that prohibit newspaper-television cross-ownership within a single market, Tribune spun off WTKR and WGNT, as well as WNEP-TV in Scranton, Pennsylvania, to Dreamcatcher Broadcasting, an unrelated company owned by former Tribune Company executive Ed Wilson. Tribune provided services to the stations through a shared services agreement and held an option to buy back WTKR and WGNT outright in the future. The sale was completed on December 27. Dreamcatcher continued to own the stations even though Tribune completed a split of its broadcasting and publishing businesses into separate companies in 2014.

=== Aborted sale to Sinclair; sale to Nexstar and resale to Scripps ===
Sinclair Broadcast Group, owner of MyNetworkTV affiliate WTVZ-TV (channel 33), entered into an agreement to acquire Tribune Media in 2017. Sinclair would have had to select one of WGNT or WTVZ-TV to keep alongside WTKR; no divestiture plan was announced. However, the transaction was designated in July 2018 for hearing by an FCC administrative law judge, and Tribune moved to terminate the deal in August 2018.

In 2019, Nexstar Media Group, owner of WAVY-TV and WVBT, announced it would acquire Tribune. Nexstar opted to retain its existing stations and sold WTKR–WGNT to the E. W. Scripps Company.

== News operation ==
WTAR-TV began airing news at the start of its history. The original newscast, Telenews, aired for 15 minutes a day, five days a week; it provided local news coverage including photography from the co-owned Norfolk newspapers. The station spent decades dominating local news ratings in Hampton Roads. In 1974, it drew more news viewers than WAVY and WVEC combined; it had the largest news staff of the three stations in town and the highest pay for news department employees, leading Mike Smith of its newspaper sister, The Virginian-Pilot, to call it the "news Goliath" of Hampton Roads. Though it also had the most conservative presentation style in the market, it had led every ratings period since records had been kept due to being ingrained in the viewing habits of longtime residents. The other stations generally attracted viewers who were new to the region.

As late as 1980, channel 3 held an 18-percentage point lead over WVEC at 6 p.m. However, in the early 1980s, immediately after the sale to Knight-Ridder, WTKR's ratings declined, leading to a more competitive ratings race among all three major stations for news coverage. By 1985, WTKR was in second place in the time slot behind either WAVY or WVEC, depending on the ratings survey. Management responded to declining ratings by firing some talent and shuffling around others, which only exacerbated the ratings slide. The station continued to find itself in second place for its early and late evening news programs in the late 1980s.

Ratings recovered somewhat in the first half of the 1990s. Several new talent hires, including longtime market meteorologist Dr. Duane Harding and sportscaster Bob Rathbun, were part of the formula that lifted WTKR to its first 6 p.m. win in six years in 1990. Rathbun departed after being named the play-by-play voice of the Detroit Tigers beginning in 1992. The Hampton Roads news ratings became a "horse race"; in the Nielsen survey for November 1993, WTKR led at noon, 5, and 6 p.m. and was a close second at 11.

A major reimaging effort in 1994, however, derailed the station's news ratings, which were already starting to fall. Under news director Barbara L. Hamm, the station rebranded from Eyewitness News to TV3 News and introduced a new set and faster format. The station's ratings at 6 fell from first to third place. After the New York Times Company purchased the station in 1995, it made major changes to its lineup of anchors. It also launched weekend morning newscasts and partnered with WGNT to launch a 10 p.m. newscast on that station—the first in the market. WGNT owner Paramount Stations Group canceled the newscast in December 1997, with its new general manager noting that the station was "in the business of entertainment programming" and "not moving in the direction of news".

In the late 1990s and early 2000s, WTKR remained in third place in local news coverage while experiencing significant and sustained turnover in on-air talent, including a run from 1995 to January 1998 in which 20 on-air staffers departed; some were dismissed by management, while others left citing low morale and fear for their jobs. Lyn Vaughn, a former anchor for Headline News, joined the station in 1999 and then left in April 2001.

In 2008, new general manager Jeff Hoffman fired the news director and associate news director. He stated in a press release that his goal was to "Take Norfolk Back!", citing that his station had once been the news leader in Hampton Roads. WTKR started the area's first 4 p.m. newscast on September 8, 2009, replacing the weekend morning newscasts. This was the station's second attempt at a newscast during the 4 p.m. hour, after a short-lived 4:30 p.m. newscast in 1995.

After Local TV acquired WGNT, WTKR began introducing newscasts on that station. On August 25, 2011, a two-hour extension of WTKR's weekday morning newscast began airing from 7 to 9 a.m. On July 7, 2014, a half-hour 7 p.m. newscast, the only one in the market at that time, made its debut on WGNT. In 2016, the station added a daily lifestyle program, Coast Live.

By 2023, the station produced 36 hours a week of newscasts plus 10 hours a week of dedicated weekday newscasts (at 7 a.m., 7 p.m., and 10 p.m.) for WGNT.

=== Notable former on-air staff ===
- Ed Hughes – anchor and reporter, 1968–2004
- Bob McAllister – children's show host
- Paula Miller – reporter, 1984–1999
- Judi Moen – host of the program Forty Plus during the mid-1990s
- Andy Roberts – TV host and weather presenter, 1956–1992
- Stephanie Sy – military reporter, 2001–2003
- Jim Vicevich – economics reporter until 1980
- William Whitehurst – commentator and reporter in the 1960s

== Technical information ==
=== Subchannels ===
WTKR's transmitter is located in Suffolk, Virginia. The station's signal is multiplexed:

Subchannels of WTKR
Subchannel	Res.	Short name	Programming
3.1	1080i	CBS	CBS
3.2	480i	Court	Court TV (4:3)
3.3	480i	Bounce	Bounce TV (4:3)
3.4	480i	HSN	HSN
3.5	480i	QVC	QVC

=== Analog-to-digital conversion ===
WTKR began digital broadcasts on channel 40 on March 11, 2002. The station discontinued regular programming on its analog signal on June 12, 2009, as part of the digital television transition; the station's digital signal remained on its pre-transition UHF channel 40, using virtual channel 3.

WTKR relocated its signal from channel 40 to channel 16 on July 2, 2020, as a result of the 2016 United States wireless spectrum auction.

=== Eastern Shore translator ===
On the Eastern Shore of Virginia, Accomack County owns two translators, W18EG-D and W25AA-D (licensed to Onancock and broadcast from Mappsville), that provide the main channel of WTKR alongside those of WAVY-TV, WVEC, and WHRO-TV.
