= WVRN-TV =

Television station in Richmond, Virginia (1984–1988)

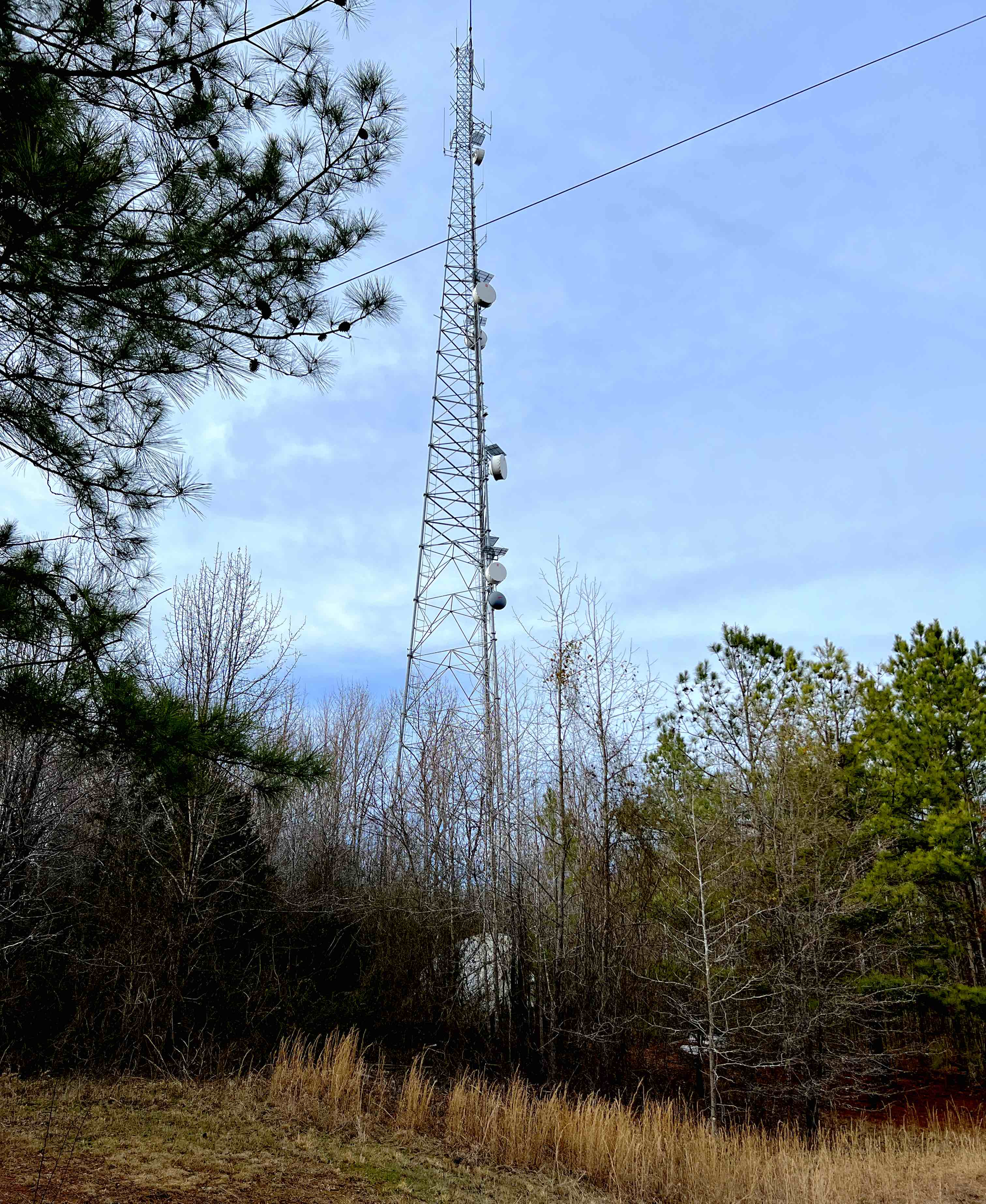
- Old WVRN-TV tower
- Richmond, Virginia; United States
- Channels: Analog: 63 (UHF)

Programming
- Affiliations: Religious independent (1984–1985); Independent (1985–1988)

Ownership
- Owner: Sudbrink Broadcasting; (Sudbrink Broadcasting Co. of Richmond)

History
- Founded: June 27, 1980
- First air date: November 24, 1984
- Last air date: September 9, 1988
- Former call signs: WRNX (1980–1984); WTLL (1984–1986)
- Call sign meaning: "We're Virginian"

Technical information
- Facility ID: 63601
- ERP: 2,600 kW
- HAAT: 390 m (1,280 ft)
- Transmitter coordinates: 37°30′14″N 77°41′53″W

WVRN-TV (channel 63) was an independent television station in Richmond, Virginia, United States. It operated from November 24, 1984, to September 8, 1988, first as a religious station, then a general entertainment independent station.

== History ==
The Christian Broadcasting Network (CBN) received a construction permit for a television station in Richmond on June 27, 1980. The station, which took the WRNX call sign, was to adopt a general entertainment format with cartoons, sitcoms and westerns, as well as religious shows, similar to its other independent stations, including flagship WYAH-TV in Hampton Roads (now WGNT). It was also to run Pat Robertson's The 700 Club three times a day.

However, in 1982, CBN sold WRNX to National Capital Christian Broadcasting, owner of WTKK in Manassas, Virginia, for $34,500. National Capital launched the station on November 24, 1984, as WTLL, airing religious programming previously shown on WRLH-TV. The format featured such Christian programming as The PTL Club, Jimmy Swaggart and many televangelists. For about seven hours a day weekdays and Saturdays, WTLL featured a mix of classic sitcoms, westerns, and some children's programs, including some recent cartoons on weekdays. The station was about 60% Christian and 40% secular. On Sundays, the station only ran Christian programming.

National Capital sold WTLL to Sudbrink Broadcasting for $3 million on March 31, 1986. The station changed its call letters to WVRN-TV on April 28, and took on a full-time general entertainment format, competing directly against WRLH. However, Richmond was not big enough at the time to support two independent stations. As a result, both stations became increasingly unprofitable.

In September 1988, Act III Broadcasting, which had recently taken over WRLH-TV, bought WVRN's assets and merged WVRN's stronger programming onto WRLH's schedule. WVRN was then shut down and its license was returned to the Federal Communications Commission and deleted.
