= List of television stations in Washington, D.C. =

This is a list of broadcast television stations serving the Washington, D.C. region.

== Full-power ==
- Stations are arranged by media market served and channel position.

Full-power television stations in Washington, D.C.
Media market	Station	Channel	Primary affiliation(s)	Notes	Refs
Washington, D.C.	WRC-TV	4	NBC		
Washington, D.C.	WTTG	5	Fox		
Washington, D.C.	WJLA-TV	7	ABC		
Washington, D.C.	WUSA	9	CBS		
Washington, D.C.	WFDC-DT	14	Univision, UniMás on 14.4	(Note: Licensed to Arlington, Virginia.)	
Washington, D.C.	WDCA	20	MyNetworkTV		
Washington, D.C.	WDVM-TV	25	Independent	(Note: Licensed to Hagerstown, Maryland.)	
Washington, D.C.	WETA-TV	26	PBS		
Washington, D.C.	WHUT-TV	32	PBS		
Washington, D.C.	WDCW	50	The CW		
Washington, D.C.	WPXW-TV	66	Ion Television	(Note: Licensed to Manassas, Virginia.)	
Washington, D.C.	WJAL	68	ShopHQ	(Note: Licensed to Silver Spring, Maryland.)	

== Low-power ==
Low-power television stations in Washington, D.C.
Media market	Station	Channel	Network	Notes	Refs
Washington, D.C.	WDCN-LD	6	The Country Network	(Note: Licensed to Fairfax, Virginia.)	
Washington, D.C.	WDCO-CD	10	Roar	(Note: Licensed to Woodstock, Virginia.)	
Washington, D.C.	WDDN-LD	23	Daystar		
Washington, D.C.	WDWA-LD	23	Daystar	(Note: Licensed to Damascus, Virginia.)	
Washington, D.C.	WRZB-LD	31	HSN2		
Washington, D.C.	WZDC-CD	44	Telemundo, TeleXitos on 44.2		
Washington, D.C.	W10DE-D	46	IBN Television on 46.2		
Washington, D.C.	WMDO-CD	47	LATV		
Washington, D.C.	WDME-CD	48	MeTV		
Washington, D.C.	WWTD-LD	49	Various		
Washington, D.C.	WIAV-CD	58	Roar		

== Defunct ==
- WOOK-TV Washington, D.C. (1963–1972)

== See also ==
- Media in Washington, D.C.
- List of television stations in Virginia
- List of television stations in Maryland

== Bibliography ==
- "United States TV Stations: District of Columbia", Yearbook of Radio and Television, New York: Radio Television Daily, 1964, OCLC 7469377 – via Internet Archive
