= Mass media in Washington, D.C. =

This article gives an overview of the mass media in Washington, D.C.. As the capital of the United States, Washington has a heavy and historic media presence. Numerous of the country's main news outlets have either their headquarters in the Washington area or major offices in the area. Additionally, numerous local media organizations as well as international news companies have Washington correspondents that cover American political, cultural, and diplomatic news from the city.

== Newspapers ==
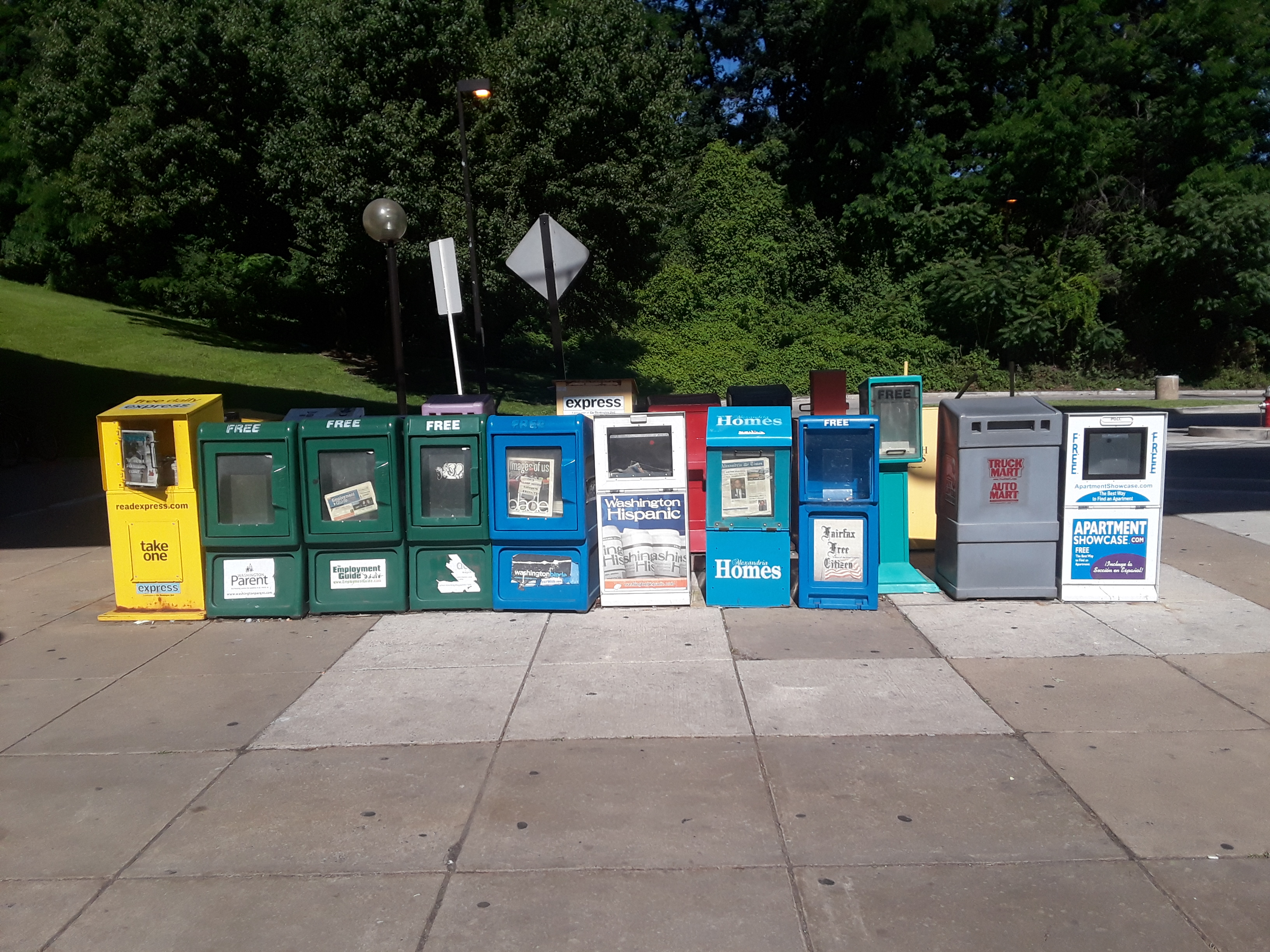
Newspaper dispensaries for some Washington-area papers

The headquarters of National Geographic, a popular magazine covering the natural world, as well as related science and history

The Washington Post is the oldest-surviving and currently the most-read daily newspaper in Washington, with a strong reputation across the U.S. It is notable for exposing the Watergate scandal, among other achievements. The Washington Post Company has multiple media holdings, the Washington Post News Service with Bloomberg News, Fashion Washington, El Tiempo Latino (a Spanish-language publication), The Slate Group, The Daily Herald (in Washington state), as well as the education company Kaplan, Inc. The Washington Post emphasizes national and political news coverage but also covers regional and local stories. Headquartered in downtown Washington, the newspaper employs journalists at 11 regional bureaus in Maryland and Virginia and 14 international bureaus. Content is shared across titles within the Washington Post Company.

The daily Washington Times and the free weekly Washington City Paper also have readership in the District. On February 1, 2005, the free daily tabloid Washington Examiner debuted, having been formed from a chain of suburban newspapers known as the Journal Newspapers. The Washington Examiner converted to a political journalism website and weekly magazine in June 2013. The Washington Sun introduced a local news section in 2026 as part of a rebrand, hiring multiple reporters from the Washington Post.

The weekly Washington Blade and Metro Weekly focus on gay issues, and the Washington Informer, and Washington Afro on African American issues. Bi-weekly Street Sense focuses on issues of homelessness poverty, and life on the streets. Other special-interest papers include Roll Call, a daily paper focused on politics.

Many neighborhoods in the District have their own community newspapers. Some of these include The Capitol Hill Current/Voice of the Hill, Hill Rag (Capitol Hill), East of the River (Anacostia) and D.C. North (Northeast D.C.). In addition, several specialty newspapers serve the U.S. Congress; most notable are Roll Call from the Congressional Quarterly, The Hill, and Politico.

USA Today, one of the nation's most widely circulating newspapers, is headquartered in nearby Tysons, Virginia. U.S. News & World Report, which covers a wide variety of news topics, is headquartered in Washington.

National Geographic, which covers the natural world and related issues, has its headquarters in Washington. The Smithsonian magazine, which is the official magazine of the Smithsonian Institution, is also headquartered in the city.

The Atlantic magazine, which has covered politics, international affairs, and cultural issues since 1857, is headquartered in an office building at the Wharf in southwest Washington.

== Television ==
As of 2024, the Washington metropolitan area is defined by Nielsen Media Research as the ninth-largest designated market area in the United States.

=== Terrestrial television ===
The first terrestrial television system in Washington D.C. was used in 1925, with a transmission from Wheaton, Maryland Charles Jenkins Laboratories by Charles Francis Jenkins, three years later Charles Jenkins Laboratories started operations of W3XK, the first TV station in the United States, since then new television networks aired and operated in Washington D.C. This was the main TV medium until the 1950s when the first cable television systems started to operate. Terrestrial television in Washington D.C. aired in analog format using VHF (channels 2 to 13), UHF (channels 14 to 69).

Analog terrestrial television is starting to be shut down in order to be replaced by digital format, both analog and digital television can be tuned or accessed with the use of traditional television antennas. Most Baltimore-area television stations can also be seen in the Washington region; besides being viewed clearly in the District, they can especially be seen in the suburbs of the Interstate 95 corridor between both cities.

=== Digital terrestrial television ===
From 2009 to 2022 US transitioned from analogical terrestrial television to digital terrestrial television, this television stations continue to be open to the public with traditional antennas without having to pay for cable television packages.

=== TV stations in Washington, D.C. ===
Note: Network owned-and-operated stations are highlighted in bold.

Washington, D.C.'s major network television affiliates are: WRC 4 (NBC), WTTG 5 (Fox), WJLA 7 (ABC), WUSA 9 (CBS), WDCA 20 (MyNetworkTV), and WDCW 50 (CW). Spanish-language programming can be seen on WFDC 14 (Univision), WZDC 44 (Telemundo) and WJAL 68 (Altavision). Washington, D.C.'s PBS member stations are WETA 26 and WHUT 32.

Other television stations in the Washington, D.C. market include: WDDN 23 (Daystar), WDVM 25 (Independent), WDME-CD 48 (MeTV), and WPXW 66 (ION).

The following networks maintain a significant presence in Washington:

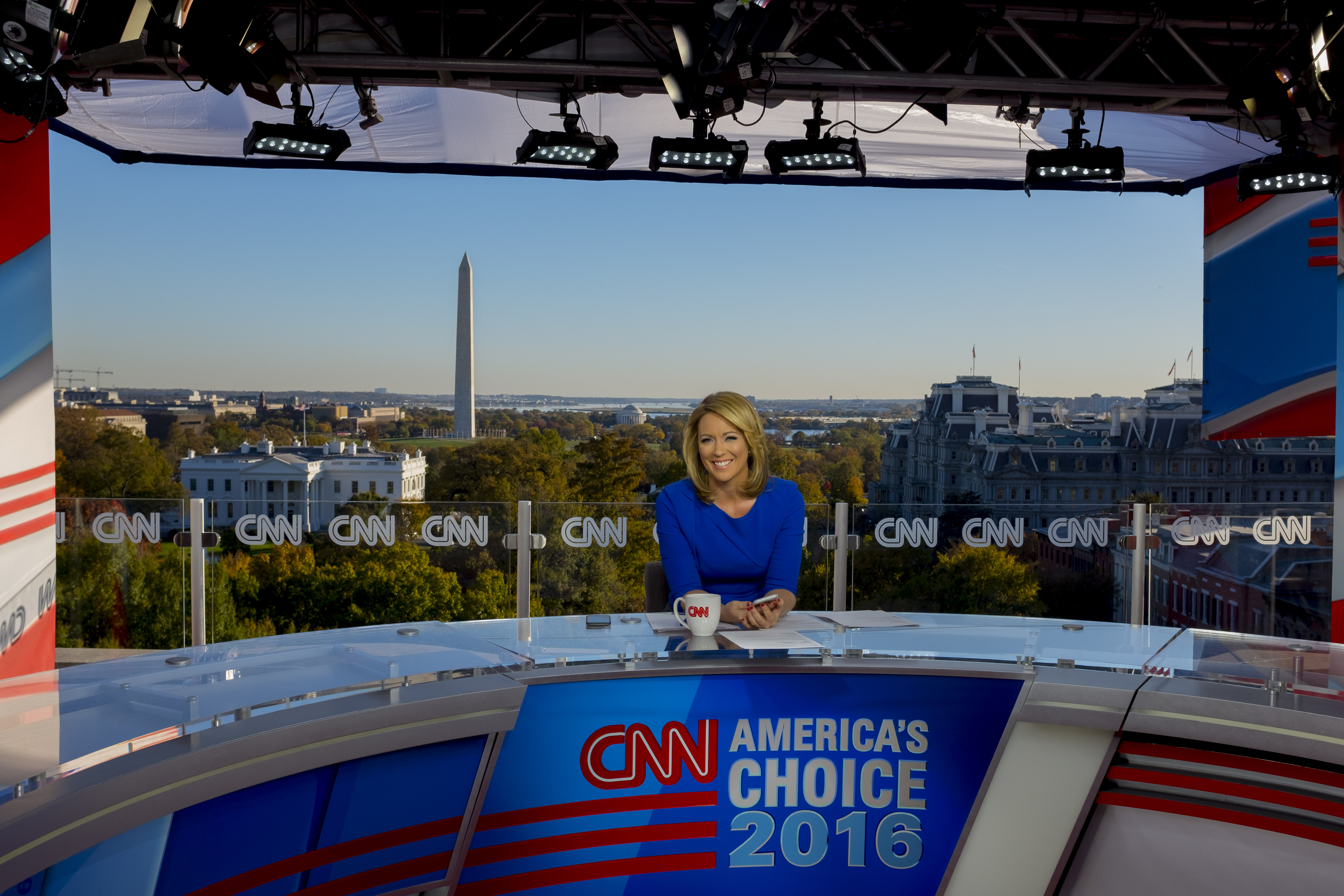
CNN reporting from Washington, D.C. during the 2016 U.S. presidential election, where D. Trump was projected to win 306 to 232 against H. Clinton, but 7 electors pushed the final vote to 304 to 227.

- CNN
- BBC,
- CBC,
- Al Jazeera, among others.

The following networks maintain a significant presence in Washington nearby areas:

- PBS is headquartered in Arlington, Virginia.
- C-SPAN,
- National Geographic Channel,
- Discovery Channel are headquartered in the Washington area,
- Tegna—owner of WUSA and other stations—is based in nearby Tysons, VA.

=== TV shows filmed in Washington D.C. area ===
The following studio shows are filmed in the Washington area:

- CBS Evening News,
- PBS NewsHour,
- Meet the Press,
- Face the Nation,
- Fox News Sunday,
- Pardon the Interruption, among others.

=== Cable television ===
Some of the companies that offer Cable TV in Washington D.C. are Direct TV, Astound Broadband and Dish.

=== Public, educational, and government access ===
Public, educational, and government access (PEG) on cable tv is provided by the Public Access Corporation of the District of Columbia on two channels simulcast to both local cable TV systems. One channel is devoted to religious programming, and the other channel provides a diversity of offerings.

The District's two PEG Channels are DCTV, a non-profit media outlet that provides training and production opportunities to residents, and OCT TV-16, which provides information about government programs, services, and related opportunities. The District's Office of Cable Television, Film, Music and Entertainment (OCTFME) produces several channels of programming for DCTV, including the District Council Channel (DCC) and the District of Columbia Network (DCN), as well as the District Knowledge Network (DKN), which is co-produced with District of Columbia Public Schools. The University of the District of Columbia also operates UDC-TV, a 24-hour cable television channel.

In addition to broadcast, cable channels MASN, NBC Sports Washington and WJLA 24/7 News are carried on cable systems in the Washington and Baltimore markets.

== Radio ==
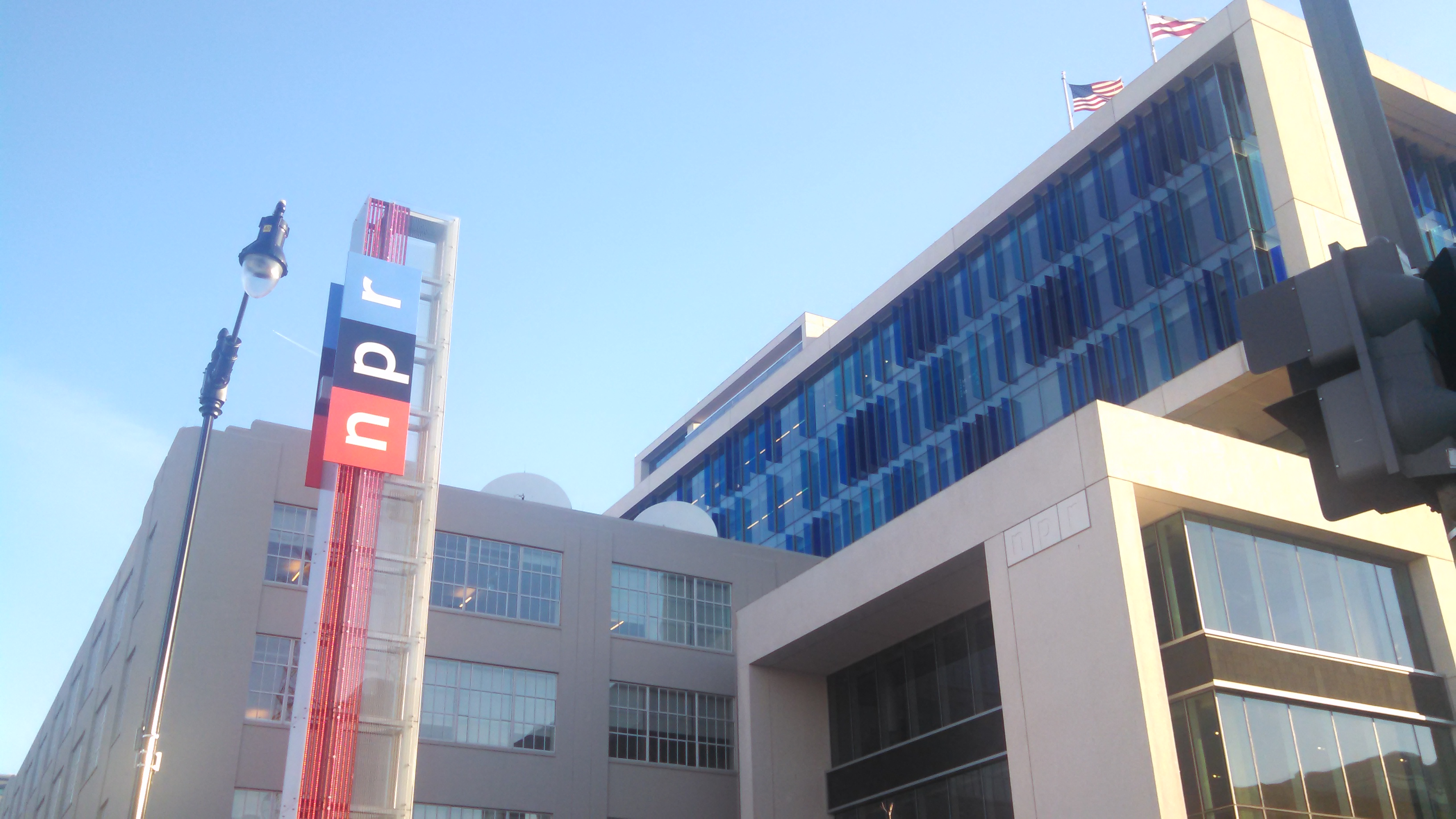
NPR headquarters located on North Capitol Street

As of 2026, the Washington metropolitan area is currently the seventh-largest radio market in the United States. NPR, XM Satellite Radio, and Voice of America, the U.S. government's international broadcasting service, are headquartered in Washington. Urban One, the largest and most significant African American-owned media conglomerate in the country, is based in Washington and owns WOL, WKYS, WMMJ and WYCB. Based at American University, WAMU is the largest publicly-supported station in the market and the primary NPR member station for Washington. WTOP-FM is the largest all-news radio station in the U.S., owned by Hubbard Broadcasting and simulcast on a network of suburban FM signals; Hubbard also owns WFED, which features government talk and had origins as an internet-only station. C-SPAN additionally operates WCSP-FM, directly simulcasting the audio from their public access cable channels.

Because of the area's crowded airwaves, most of the student-run radio stations at D.C.-area colleges operate solely as webcasters, including Bowie State University's WBSU, the Catholic University of America's WCUA, George Mason University's WGMU, Georgetown University's WGTB, Montgomery College's WMCR, and American University's WVUA. WMUC at the University of Maryland, College Park, and WHBC at Howard University operate on FM and an FM HD Radio subchannel respectively. Radio CPR was a pirate radio station broadcasting on 97.5 MHz in the Mount Pleasant, Adams Morgan and Columbia Heights neighborhoods from 1998 to 2017.

Many major radio stations from Baltimore can be heard in the Washington metropolitan area; WAIW from Winchester, Virginia, can also be occasionally received in some sections of Northwest.

== Internet media ==
Washington has over 60 online news outlets, in addition to websites run by the major print and broadcast media outlets. Washington ranks first out of the nation's largest designated market areas in household possession of a computer (82.9% of adults in the metro area) and Internet access (80% of adults online in the last 30 days). For news consumption, the city's major mainstream print and broadcast outlets command the most page views online, as well: WashingtonPost.com leads the pack with 10.6 million readers, an audience that extends beyond the metro region to include visitors from across the country. These mainstream outlets use their websites for various purposes. WashingtonPost.com, for example, features 107 blogs, including a section of the site called "All Opinions Are Local," which republishes selected content from area bloggers. Other types of partnerships include TV broadcaster WUSA's pairing with Metromix, an online entertainment guide that caters to a younger audience than those who tune into the station's news broadcasts.

Whether hyperlocal, citywide, or regional, blogs also play a significant role in DC's media environment. JDLand was among the early tranche of hyperlocal blogs to gain traction in Washington. Founded by Jacqueline Dupree in 2003, it covers developments in her neighborhood of Near Southeast. It averages one to two posts per day. DCist, a member of the Gothamist blog network, has the largest readership of any local blog in DC, with 1.7 million page views per month. The blog averages 15–20 posts per day and contains a mix of commentary, reader submissions, original reporting, and republished news. It covers a variety of neighborhoods across the District. "Prince of Petworth" is another blog with a well-developed following; it was founded in 2006 and has since expanded from its focus on the Northwest DC neighborhood of Petworth to include 34 neighborhoods across the city. In Southeast Washington, the leading blog is "And Now, Anacostia," which commands approximately 5,000 page views per month. Sites which focus on the arts, like Brightest Young Things and Jukebox DC, have been an integral part of DC's vibrant and growing music, entertainment and cultural scenes.

A joint TV-online venture, TBD, launched in August 2010 under the ownership of Allbritton Communications, which also owns Politico and broadcasters WJLA and News Channel 8, now rebranded as TBD TV. General Manager Jim Brady founded TBD after leaving WashingtonPost.com. Founding editor Erik Wemple came by way of local alt-weekly The Washington City Paper.

== Sports media ==
The Washington, D.C. area has a major sports media industry, catering to both regional and national sports.

The local sports television network, Monumental Sports Network, is based in Washington, and airs games for the Washington Capitals and Washington Wizards. The network also has shows focused on the Washington Commanders.

The Washington Nationals play their games on MASN, a network they share with the Baltimore Orioles.

The Washington Commanders have a partnership with the classic rock radio station BIG 100.3, which broadcasts radio coverage of all of their games.

Among the local sports talk radio stations are 106.7 The Fan, The Team 980, and ESPN 630 D.C. The Sports Junkies are among the most popular shows on The Fan, and they have covered local sports and culture in the D.C. area since 1996.

The primary print news source for local sports coverage is The Washington Post, whose sports section has been written by numerous award-winning journalists over the decades, including Michael Wilbon, Tony Kornheiser, and John Feinstein.

Washington, D.C. is also home to nationally televised sports shows, including the midnight edition of ESPN's SportsCenter, hosted by Scott Van Pelt, as well as ESPN's Pardon the Interruption, hosted by former Washington Post columnists Michael Wilbon and Tony Kornheiser. Previously, the city was home to ESPN's Around the Horn.

== See also ==
- Media in Baltimore
- List of films set in Washington, D.C.
- List of television shows set in Washington, D.C.
- Economy of the Washington metropolitan area
