= DCTV =

DCTV may refer to:

- DCTV (TV station), a station in Washington, D.C.
- Digital cable television, the distribution method
- Downtown Community Television Center, a community media center in Manhattan, New York City
- Dublin Community Television
- DC TV, was a part of DC Entertainment.
