= List of television stations in Washington =

List of television stations in Washington may refer to:

- List of television stations in Washington (state)
- List of television stations in Washington, D.C.
