= Fox 43 =

Fox 43 may refer to one of the following television stations in the United States:

== Current ==
- KSVT-LD in Twin Falls, Idaho
- KTMJ-CD in Topeka, Kansas
- WFXB in Myrtle Beach, South Carolina
- WPMT in Harrisburg, Pennsylvania
- WSVF-CD in Harrisonburg, Virginia
- WTNZ in Knoxville, Tennessee
- WVBT in Virginia Beach, Virginia
- WYZZ-TV in Peoria–Bloomington, Illinois

== Former ==
- KAUT-TV in Oklahoma City, Oklahoma (1986 to 1991)
