= WDCO-CD =

Television station in Woodstock, Virginia

WDCO-CD and WIAV-CD
ATSC 3.0 station

WDCO-CD: Woodstock, Virginia; WIAV-CD: Washington, D.C.; United States
- Channels for WDCO-CD: Digital: 24 (UHF); Virtual: 10
- Channels for WIAV-CD: Digital: 30 (UHF); Virtual: 58

Programming
- Affiliations: 10.1/58.1: Roar

Ownership
- Owner: Sinclair Broadcast Group; (ACC Licensee, LLC)
- Sister stations: Broadcast: WJLA-TV; Cable: WJLA 24/7 News

History
- Founded: WDCO-CD: April 30, 1985; WIAV-CD: August 23, 1989
- First air date: WDCO-CD: September 30, 1985; WIAV-CD: September 26, 1994
- Former call signs: WDCO-CD: W10AZ (1985–1994); WAZT-LP (1994–2002); WAZT-CA (2002–2015); WAZT-LD (2015); WAZT-CD (2015–2017); WIAV-CD: W58BR (1989–1996); WIAV-CA (1996–2008); WIAV-LD (2008–2015)
- Former channel number: WDCO-CD: Analog: 10 (VHF, 1985–2015); Digital: 45 (UHF, 2015–2019); WIAV-CD: Analog: 58 (UHF, 1994–2010); Digital: 44 (UHF, 2008–2017)
- Former affiliations: WDCO-CD: Religious Independent (1985–2018); Jewelry TV (2018–2020)
- Call sign meaning: WIAV-CD: AsiaVision (former owner)

Technical information
- Licensing authority: FCC
- Facility ID: WDCO-CD: 57905; WIAV-CD: 168063
- Class: CD
- ERP: WDCO-CD: 15 kW; WIAV-CD: 48 kW
- HAAT: 151.2 m (496 ft)
- Transmitter coordinates: 38°56′24.2″N 77°4′52.5″W

Links
- Public license information: WDCO-CD: Public file; LMS; WIAV-CD: Public file; LMS

WDCO-CD (channel 10) is a low-power, Class A television station licensed to Woodstock, Virginia, United States, serving the Washington, D.C. metropolitan area with programming from the digital multicast network Roar. Owned and operated by Sinclair Broadcast Group, it is sister to ABC affiliate WJLA-TV (channel 7) and local cable channel WJLA 24/7 News. WDCO-CD's transmitter is located in Ward Circle in Washington's northwest quadrant.

Co-owned and co-located WIAV-CD (channel 58), licensed to Washington, relays WDCO-CD's Roar programming in the new ATSC 3.0 broadcasting standard.

== History ==
=== Shenandoah Valley religious broadcaster ===
Logo used until 2009.

The station has operated since September 30, 1985, when it was put on the air as a religious independent station by Ruarch Associates, LLC (its original calls were W10AZ, with the WAZT calls, introduced in 1994, apparently being derived from it), and once had a radio sister station, WAZR in nearby Harrisonburg.

The WAZT network offered some programming from Cornerstone and other religious networks, but it generally did not show them in-pattern with those networks, and it also broadcast some secular syndicated programming and classic television shows.

WAZT once broadcast a local newscast at 5:30 p.m. and 9:30 p.m. Monday through Friday (entitled News 10), but this was discontinued on December 26, 2005. In January 2006, WAZT began airing CBN's NewsWatch program.

Ruarch sold WAZT to JLA Media & Publications (no relation to WJLA-TV) in 2006. Jones Broadcasting acquired the station out of Chapter 7 bankruptcy in 2011.

In 2012, Jones Broadcasting reached a deal to buy the struggling and bankrupt Danville-based independent WEFC-TV, located in the larger Roanoke–Lynchburg market, with plans to move operations to Roanoke and make it the new group flagship. The sale fell through in the spring of 2013, with Liberty University buying the station instead; Jones then sold the WAZT group of stations to Venture Technologies Group that December.

Venture immediately began moving WAZT and its sister stations to the far larger Washington, D.C., television market. At the time, WAZT transmitted from a hill near Toms Brook, Virginia. After agreeing to purchase the WAZT network, Venture obtained a construction permit to move the station's analog signal to the WZRV tower near Front Royal, Virginia. Later in 2014, it filed for a digital signal at a new transmitter site near The Plains, Virginia, which signed on in March 2015. Venture also purchased Washington-based WIAV-CD in 2014, which expanded the network's footprint into the city proper.

After spending most of its time as a religious broadcaster branded as simply "WAZT", the station and its relays changed to the branding "Faith Television Network" under Venture's ownership.

WAZT-CD's callsign was changed to WDCO-CD on October 11, 2017. On the same day, Winchester repeater WAZW-CD became WAZT-CD. On January 24, 2018, Faith Television Network announced it would cease broadcasting. All four remaining stations in the network became full-time affiliates of Jewelry Television on January 31.

=== Move-in to Washington ===
As a result of the Federal Communications Commission (FCC)'s 2016–17 spectrum reallocation incentive auction, channels 24 and 30—occupied by WNVC and WNVT, respectively—became available in the Washington market in 2018. WDCO-CD applied to take over WNVC's channel 24 facilities at its tower in Merrifield, Virginia, which would place it firmly in the Washington market, while WIAV-CD applied to move to channel 30. After WNVC was unable to find a channel-sharing partner and went off the air, it sold the tower and transmitter building. Left without a transmission site, WDCO-CD moved to temporary low-powered facilities shared with WIAV-CD at the WRC-TV (channel 4) tower in northwest Washington, and reapplied to permanently build there.

The new WAZT-CD later relocated from Winchester to Blue Ridge Mountain in extreme southern Jefferson County, West Virginia, near the Virginia–West Virginia state line but also within the Washington market. After an additional "hop" to a tower in Leesburg, Virginia, this license was also moved into Washington proper and sold to Weigel Broadcasting, who operates it as WDME-CD.

On June 25, 2020, Venture Technologies Group filed an agreement with the FCC to sell WDCO-CD and WIAV-CD to Sinclair Broadcast Group for $8.5 million. The sale was completed on October 15, making them Sinclair's second and third properties in the Washington market, alongside WJLA-TV. On the same day, WDCO-CD and WIAV-CD flipped to Sinclair's TBD multicast network. WAZT-CD was not included in the sale and continued to air Jewelry TV programming; it was later sold to Weigel Broadcasting and is now WDME-CD.

Sinclair's express intention for the purchase of the two stations was to convert WIAV-CD to Washington's first ATSC 3.0 broadcaster. WDCO-CD is to continue ATSC 1.0 service and honor the existing channel-sharing agreement with UniMás affiliate WMDO-CD (channel 47). To clear the way for ATSC 3.0 conversion work, WMDO-CD switched its channel-share from WIAV-CD to WDCO-CD at the end of 2020.

Sinclair subsequently commenced ATSC 3.0 operation over WIAV-CD on March 25, 2021.

WDCO-CD and WIAV-CD satisfy the requirement that Class A stations broadcast at least three hours per week of locally produced programming by airing WJLA's weekday 5 and 6 p.m. newscasts on a two-hour delay from 7 to 8:30 p.m. The entire TBD schedule remains available on streaming and over-the-air on WJLA-DT4 and Baltimore's WUTB.

== Former translators ==
WDCO-CD formerly operated five other relays:

=== WAZC-LP ===
WAZC-LP went on the air on March 29, 1988, as W16AA, a translator for Charlottesville's NBC affiliate, WVIR-TV owned by Rockingham County with a transmitter on Massanutten Peak. In 1998, it was sold to Ruarch and moved to Luray. On November 5, 2004, WJAL in Hagerstown, Maryland, received the allocation for its digital signal, resulting in WAZC-LP being forced to move to channel 35 on March 31, 2006. A construction permit for WAZC-LD on channel 35 expired in June 2010 without being built. This station was not included in the 2013 sale to Venture and later went off the air. Its license was cancelled by the FCC on October 2, 2020.

=== WAZM-CA ===
WAZM-CA signed on for the first time on December 26, 1996 (as W25CC, later W25AZ) and was a relay for Staunton and Waynesboro. In April 2012, Jones Broadcasting sold this station to Gray Television, who converted it to digital CBS/Fox affiliate WSVF-CD in October of that year.

=== WAZF-CD ===
WAZF-CD signed on for the first time on June 7, 1994, as W28AZ, becoming WFAZ-CA on October 19, 2000, and WAZF-CA on January 5, 2001. This station was licensed to Front Royal, Virginia, and in the analog era broadcast on channel 28 from the same Winchester tower as then-WAZW-CA; WAZF-CA's signal was pointed toward Front Royal while WAZW-CA's was pointed toward Charles Town, West Virginia. On March 13, 2014, this station signed on a digital signal on UHF channel 20 (virtual channel 28.1) from a transmitter on Short Hill Mountain southeast of Harpers Ferry, West Virginia. WAZF-CD's license was sold for $513,526 in the spectrum reallocation auction, and was taken off the air on August 3, 2017.

=== WAZH-CD ===
WAZH-CD which was founded on January 4, 1989, as W24AZ, signed on for the first time on April 16, 1992, and on October 5, 2000, it briefly took the callsign WWAZ-CA before becoming WAZH-CA on January 5, 2001. Although its callsign implied it was to be the relay for Harrisonburg, in the analog era it broadcast from a ridge above Basye with a directional signal pointed at Mount Jackson. After the digital transition, the new WAZH-CD moved to Signal Knob near Strasburg, which was the same location as then-WAZW-CD. The station operated on UHF channel 14 and virtual channel 24.1. Venture sold WAZH-CD's channel 14 allocation for $12,042,490 in the spectrum reallocation auction, missed the subsequent deadline to reach a channel-sharing agreement with another Harrisonburg station, and elected to surrender the license on April 23, 2018.

== Subchannels ==
Subchannel of WDCO-CD
Subchannel	Res.	Short name	Programming
10.1	1080i	WDCO	Roar

Subchannels of WIAV-CD (ATSC 3.0)
Subchannel	Res.	Short name	Programming
58.1	1080i	WIAV	Roar
58.5	1080i	24/7MMT	WJLA 24/7 News
