= WJAL =

Television station in Silver Spring, Maryland

- Silver Spring, Maryland; Washington, D.C.; United States
- City: Silver Spring, Maryland (Note: Originally licensed to Hagerstown, Maryland; moved to Silver Spring in 2017.)
- Channels: Digital: 9 (VHF), shared with WUSA; Virtual: 68

Programming
- Affiliations: 68.1: AltaVision; 68.2: Defy

Ownership
- Owner: Entravision Communications; (Entravision Holdings, LLC)

History
- First air date: May 6, 1987
- Former channel numbers: Analog: 68 (UHF, 1987–2009); Digital: 16 (UHF, 2005–2009), 39 (UHF, 2009–2017)
- Former affiliations: Independent (1987–1995, 1998–2017); The WB (1995–1998); LATV (2017–2018); Heartland (2018); Sonlife (2018–2021); NTD America (2021–2023); ShopHQ (2023–2024); Merit TV (2024–2025); LATV (2025)
- Call sign meaning: "With Jesus as Lord" (from original Christian-oriented format)

Technical information
- Licensing authority: FCC
- Facility ID: 10259
- ERP: 52 kW
- HAAT: 235.6 m (773 ft)
- Transmitter coordinates: 38°57′1″N 77°4′46″W

Links
- Public license information: Public file; LMS

WJAL (channel 68) is a television station licensed to Silver Spring, Maryland, United States, serving the Washington, D.C., area as an affiliate of the Spanish-language network AltaVision. Owned by Entravision Communications, it is sister to Washington-licensed WMDO-CD (channel 47). WJAL shares transmitter facilities with CBS affiliate WUSA (channel 9) on Wisconsin Avenue in the Tenleytown section of northwest Washington.

== History ==
=== As a Hagerstown station ===
Owned by Good Companion Broadcasting, a Christian non-profit organization, WJAL first broadcast on May 6, 1987, originally licensed to Hagerstown, Maryland, as that city's third television station (after WHAG-TV and WWPB). WJAL's offices were located in Chambersburg, Pennsylvania (within the Harrisburg market), and its original transmitter was located 15 miles (24 km) west of Chambersburg and 85 miles (137 km) northwest of Washington, atop Tuscarora Mountain near the town of McConnellsburg.

WJAL was the Washington market's charter WB affiliate when the network launched on January 11, 1995. Six weeks later, The WB added WFTY (channel 50, the former WCQR), based in Washington proper. As WJAL was not seen in Washington either over-the-air or on cable, both stations aired the network's programming. The station ended its WB affiliation on September 14, 1998, as Good Companion felt the network's programming did not fit with their desired family-friendly image.

In August 2001, Good Companion sold WJAL-TV to Entravision Communications for $10.3 million. The main impetus of the purchase of WJAL for Entravision was to attempt to move the station's license to Silver Spring, Maryland, as a replacement for its low-power WMDO-CA, which at the time was a Univision affiliate. WJAL first attempted to move its then-proposed digital signal on channel 16 to Silver Spring in 2002. The application was denied as the Federal Communications Commission (FCC) determined local television service to Hagerstown would be unfairly affected. The proposed signal would also cause unacceptable interference to adjacent channel 17, which is used for public safety services in Washington. Entravision submitted an appeal in 2006, as it had changed WJAL's choice for its post-digital-transition channel from 16 to 39. By this time, the FCC had decided to stop considering the relocation of a station's city of license in preparation for the 2009 digital television transition. After the freeze, the FCC decided it would no longer support such a move and dismissed the application in 2012. Thus, WJAL continued to run a family-friendly English format for Hagerstown, a submarket with a low need for a Spanish-language outlet.

=== Spectrum sale and channel-sharing agreement; move to Washington ===
In the FCC's incentive auction, WJAL sold its channel 39 allocation for $25,492,333 and indicated that it would enter into a post-auction channel sharing agreement. On July 28, 2017, WJAL submitted a channel-sharing agreement with WUSA (channel 9). WJAL retained its existing callsign and virtual channel number, but moved its city of license to Silver Spring, Maryland. The over-the-air signal from Tuscarora Mountain went dark at midnight on September 30, 2017, and the station immediately moved to WUSA's transmitter in the early morning of October 1.

Although Entravision's stated goal was to convert WJAL to a UniMás affiliate, WJAL broadcast LATV instead. Entravision and Univision Communications entered into a 16-year joint sales agreement on January 1, 2006, under which Entravision operated Univision affiliate WFDC (channel 14). Current UniMás affiliate WMDO-CD (channel 47) was additionally bound to the network until the contract's expiration on December 31, 2021. A provision prohibiting Entravision from operating another station with a "Spanish-language format" in the Washington market was removed in a revision that took effect on the first weekday after the channel-share was implemented, October 2, 2017, allowing WJAL to air LATV.

In May 2018, WJAL switched its affiliation to the Heartland network. LATV has since returned to its previous location on WMDO-CD's second subchannel. WJAL flipped again to the brokered Sonlife Broadcasting Network on June 15, joining WWTD-LD as the second SBN station in Washington.

On September 17, 2021, WJAL began airing NTD America programming. This was flipped to home shopping programming from ShopHQ in November 2023.

From August 21, 2024, to July 1, 2025, WJAL was an affiliate of Merit TV. It briefly returned to LATV before switching to AltaVision on November 3.

== Programming ==
Until its move to Washington, WJAL aired a mix of religious programming (especially on Sundays), public affairs programming, syndicated shows, sitcom reruns, movies, and children's programs.

WJAL produced a local newscast from the end of its WB affiliation in 1998 through October 2001, when it was suspended due to financial issues.

Until 2016, the station also carried West Virginia Tonight from WBOY-TV in Clarksburg, West Virginia; the program moved to WHAG-TV after WHAG's owner, Nexstar Broadcasting Group, acquired the West Virginia Media Holdings stations.

== Technical information ==
=== Subchannels ===
Subchannels of WUSA and WJAL
License	Subchannel	Res.	Short name	Programming
WUSA	9.1	1080i	WUSA-HD	CBS
WUSA	9.2	480i	Crime	True Crime Network
WUSA	9.3	480i	Quest	Quest
WUSA	9.4	480i	NEST	The Nest
WUSA	9.5	480i	QVC	QVC
WJAL	68.1	720p	AltaVsn	Altavision
WJAL	68.2	480i	DEFY	Defy

=== Analog-to-digital conversion ===
WJAL shut down its analog signal, over UHF channel 68, on February 17, 2009, the original target date on which full-power television stations in the United States were to transition from analog to digital broadcasts under federal mandate (which was later pushed back to June 12, 2009). The station's digital signal remained on its pre-transition UHF channel 39, using virtual channel 68.
