= Soccer Academy =

Children's television show

- Genre: Educational
- Created by: Antonio Soave
- Directed by: Various
- Starring: Antonio Soave
- Narrated by: Antonio Soave
- Country of origin: United States
- Original language: English
- No. of seasons: 2
- No. of episodes: Various

Production
- Executive producer: Antonio Soave
- Producer: Antonio Soave
- Production location: Various
- Cinematography: Various
- Editor: Various
- Camera setup: Various
- Running time: 10-21 minutes
- Production companies: Capistrano Productions; Global Soccer foundation for world Peace

Original release
- Network: LATV
- Release: 2000 – present

The Soccer Academy is a children's television show produced by Capistrano Films. The show is shown in over 23 countries around the world, including the United States, Africa, and the Middle East.

Soccer Academy is a children's television show based upon the skills needed by children to participate in soccer. The demonstration of soccer skills during the program is performed by professional soccer players participating from the country in which the show is taking place.

Along with the soccer skills, there is also a mix or culture, religion, and pop culture, as well as interaction with the local people from whichever country the television show is featuring for that specific episode.

"The Soccer Academy" qualifies as child-friendly programming from an instructional and educational perspective, and has been issued the IE certificate by the United States for the show's educational value to children.

The parent company, Capistrano Films, has an office located in Kansas.

New episodes have begun airing in October 2020.

Season 4 will begin airing in early 2022.
