= WMDO-CD =

Television station in Washington, D.C.

- Washington, D.C.; United States
- Channels: Digital: 14 (UHF), shared with WWTD-LD; Virtual: 47

Programming
- Affiliations: 47.1: LATV

Ownership
- Owner: Entravision Communications; (Entravision Holdings, LLC)
- Sister stations: WJAL

History
- First air date: 1976
- Former call signs: W14AA (1976–1989); W48AW (1989–1995); WMDO-LP (1995–2001); WMDO-CA (2001–2015)
- Former channel numbers: Analog: 14 (UHF, 1976–1989), 48 (UHF, 1989–1999), 30 (UHF, 1999–2003), 47 (UHF, 2003–2015); Digital: 8 (VHF, 2008–2015), 22 (UHF, 2015–2017), 44 (UHF, 2017–2020), 30 (UHF, 2020–2021), 24 (UHF, 2021–2023)
- Former affiliations: PBS (via WNVT, 1976–1981) SIN/Univision (1981–2005); TeleFutura/UniMás (2006–2021); Silent (2021–2022, 2023–2024)
- Call sign meaning: "Mundo" (world in Spanish)

Technical information
- Licensing authority: FCC
- Facility ID: 38437
- Class: CD
- ERP: 15 kW
- HAAT: 174.9 m (574 ft)
- Transmitter coordinates: 38°56′24″N 77°4′53″W

Links
- Public license information: Public file; LMS

WMDO-CD (channel 47) is a low-power, Class A television station in Washington, D.C., affiliated with LATV. It is owned by Entravision Communications alongside Silver Spring, Maryland–licensed AltaVision affiliate WJAL (channel 68).

== History ==
The station first signed on the air as W14AA on UHF channel 14 in 1976. First owned by Central Virginia Educational Television Corporation, it rebroadcast the signal of PBS member station WNVT from a transmitter in Arlington, Virginia. WNVT's transmitter was located in Independent Hill, Virginia, and was difficult to receive in the built-up parts of the Washington metropolitan area.

As Washington's original channel 14, WFAN-TV, had gone dark in 1972, CVETC attempted to have the vacant full-power allocation moved to Fairfax. This stoked controversy, as channel 14 was the last available commercial allocation assigned to Washington. Several competing groups and District of Columbia Mayor Walter E. Washington contested CVETC's application, arguing that Washington was under-served by local television and that the channel should possibly be reserved for a minority-owned station. The request was denied, but channel 56 was allocated to Fairfax as a compromise. CVETC took this allocation and began building what was to become WNVC instead, rendering W14AA unnecessary. CVETC used the translator to broadcast Congressional hearings until WNVC went on the air June 6, 1981.

Meanwhile, Los Cerezos Television Co. signed on station KA2XEH on channel 56 on June 29, 1980. The station relayed the programming of the Spanish International Network (SIN, as Univision was then known) via a satellite feed of flagship KWEX-TV in San Antonio, Texas. At the time, television translators were limited to the same rules as commercial FM translators and could only repeat a station's signal received over-the-air. As part of an FCC trial, SIN signed on two of these "satellators" under experimental licenses, denoted by the "2X" in the callsign. With the FCC's rules relaxed, Los Cerezos purchased W14AA in July 1981, and SIN programming was on the air soon afterward. Los Cerezos later made two failed attempts to move W14AA to Wheaton, Maryland, where its radio station WMDO (1540 AM) was already located. The license for KA2XEH was deleted effective October 1, 1981, as its channel 56 allocation had been given to WNVC.

On November 1, 1988, as the full-powered channel 14 allocation had been awarded to what would become WTMW, W14AA moved to channel 48 and received the new call sign of W48AW. The call letters were changed to WMDO-LP on February 1, 1995. In October 1998, WMDO-LP moved to channel 30, in order to allow NBC owned-and-operated station WRC-TV to launch its digital signal on channel 48. On March 20, 2001, the station changed its call letters to WMDO-CA to reflect an upgrade to Class A status.

The WMDO callsign derives not from a former or planned affiliation with competing Spanish-language network Telemundo, but from co-ownership by Los Cerezos with WMDO radio. The pair was broken up in 1999, when the television station was sold to Entravision.

In 2001, Entravision purchased Hagerstown, Maryland–based English-language independent station WJAL (channel 68), intending to move it into Washington to replace WMDO-CA, although they were unsuccessful at the time. In November 2003, WMDO-CA moved to channel 47 so that WNVT could sign on its digital signal on channel 30; Entravision complained that WMDO-CA lost 45 per cent of its audience because of the weaker signal.

On January 1, 2006, Entravision entered into a 16-year joint sales agreement (JSA) with Univision Communications, owner of then-TeleFutura affiliate WFDC-DT (channel 14). Under the agreement, the Univision affiliation for the Washington market was passed to WFDC in return for Entravision handling its operation and advertising sales. WMDO-CD joined TeleFutura (since renamed to UniMás) on the same day. The agreement expired on December 31, 2021; WFDC-DT retained the Univision affiliation after that date.

In the summer of 2009, WMDO-LD began broadcasting a digital signal on VHF channel 8. This signal was nearly unusable as it received interference from WJLA-TV on channel 7, WUSA on channel 9, and distant station WGAL on channel 8. WMDO was forced to accept the interference as there were no other available channels in the area. In March 2011, WMDO filed to move to channel 22; Daystar was to use the channel for WDDN-LD, but accidentally allowed the construction permit to lapse in September 2010. After a legal fight with Daystar over the allocation, on May 22, 2015, the station was licensed to move to channel 22, and it changed its call sign to the current WMDO-CD.

WMDO-CD was a winner in the FCC's 2016–17 spectrum reallocation auction, and received $58,231,415 to go off the air. Winners in the auction who were to leave the air had the option of pursuing a channel-sharing agreement with another station to preserve over-the-air coverage. WMDO-CD reached an agreement with WIAV-CD. The station suspended operations over its own signal on channel 22 and moved to WIAV-CD's signal on channel 44 on December 1, 2017.

Sinclair Broadcast Group purchased WIAV-CD in June 2020 with the intent of converting it to Washington's first ATSC 3.0 broadcaster. Consequently, WMDO-CD applied to dissolve its channel-sharing agreement with WIAV-CD and file a new one with co-owned and co-located WDCO-CD (channel 10), which continued ATSC 1.0 service. The FCC granted the dissolution on January 21, with the relocation occurring in March.

The channel-sharing agreement with WDCO-CD expired on December 31, 2021, and Entravision did not exercise its option to extend. With no authorized facilities to continue broadcasting, Entravision filed to take WMDO-CD silent pending a new channel-sharing agreement. UniMás programming moved to the fourth subchannel of WFDC-DT in advance of the shutdown.

Entravision applied for a third channel-sharing agreement with WWTD-LD (channel 14), located on the WRC-TV tower in northwest Washington, on December 21, 2022. WMDO-CD returned to broadcasting on December 29, three days before its license would have been deleted for inactivity pursuant to the Telecommunications Act of 1996. The channel-sharing agreement expired on December 21, 2023, and did not contain any provisions for an extension. Despite the contract's expiration, WMDO-CD did not cease operations until March 15, 2024. Entravision indicated it was negotiating with another channel-sharing partner at the time, but resumed operations on WWTD-LD's multiplex on June 27.

== Subchannels ==
Subchannels of WWTD-LD and WMDO-CD
License	Channel	Res.	Short name	Programming
WWTD-LD
WWTD-LD	49.2	480i	HSN2	HSN2 (4:3)
WWTD-LD	49.3	480i	QVC2	QVC2 (4:3)
WWTD-LD	49.4	480i	NTDTV	NTD America (4:3)
WWTD-LD	49.5	480i	SonLife	SonLife (4:3)
WWTD-LD	49.6	480i	ShopLC	Shop LC (4:3)
WMDO-CD	47.1	480i	LATV	LATV
