= Ceasar and Chuy =

- Created by: Alfonso Amey, Keu Reyes
- Voices of: Keu Reyes; Rick Najera
- Country of origin: United States
- No. of seasons: 1
- No. of episodes: 26 (including 1 pilot episode)

Production
- Running time: approximately 23 minutes

Original release
- Network: LATV
- Release: November 6, 2007

Ceasar and Chuy is an American animated television series created by Alfonso Amey and Keu Reyes. The series premiered November 8, 2007 on the LATV Network. On June 12, 2008, the series began airing on Mun2.

== Characters ==
Ceasar and Chuy are a couple of animated hosts of a music video show on LATV. The pair watch and critique music videos as they are being shown. Ceasar and Chuy have ongoing hilarious stories throughout the episodes, and they touch on serious issues ranging from Global Warming to the state of education; all of course, from their unique perspective.

Ceasar and Chuy attend the East City Vocational Junior College and they interact with other characters in that setting. One of them being Keel Whitay, a professor, and others include their classmates, Jerome, Rosario, and Dhat Ho. Ceasar and Chuy's family names or age are never mentioned on the show, but it is presumed they are in the range of 18 to 24 years old.

Chuy	Chuy is an East LA Native with a personality disorder. Inconclusive results have shown that Chuy's bipolarism mixed with ADD and a hint of manic depression is the destructive combination that drives Chuy's life.
Ceasar	Ceasar is a native of Puerto Rico, and he seems to bring the calm and peace that has become indispensable to Chuy. he tries to keep an open mind, while still being reasonable. Chuy hardly ever listens to Ceasar's advice, hence ensuring that Ceasar is constantly cleaning up after Chuy.
Keel Whitay	Keel Whitey is an extremely liberal professor at the East City Vocational Junior College where Ceasar and Chuy attend classes. Even though he is a Caucasian male, Keel Whitay feels the guilt and responsibility to the welfare of minorities in the United States. Having studied at UC Berkeley, Keel Whitay received his PhD in liberal arts.
Jerome	Jerome is Ceasar and Chuy's African-American friend. Jerome is paranoid and feel everything in his life, especially bad things, happen because he's black. Jerome is most likely Ceasar and Chuy's best friend.
Rosario	Rosario is another student at the East City Vocational Junior College, and she's a product of her environment. Rosario has three children by three different fathers and she's only seventeen years-old. Rosario will eventually become Ceasar's love interest, even though she loves Chuy.
Dhat Ho	Dhat Ho is a student from Vietnam and she is the most conservative right winger from the entire show. She appreciates the opportunity to be studying in America, and feels that Americans are ungrateful. Even though it has not been revealed yet, Dhat Ho shows signs of sexual deviancy. Chuy is in absolute lust for Dhat Ho.

=== Recurring themes ===
The series has a number of recurring elements.

- Ceasar and Chuy work at LATV and broadcast their show live from the station's studio. They spend most of their time watching and critiquing music videos. Chuy has quit the show on several occasions to pursuit other interests, only to come back and beg for his job with shame.
- Ceasar and Chuy have started many debates at school, often dividing the class into groups that disagree. Some of the debates have included the correct way to use language, and the Iraq war.
- One of Chuy's life goals is to become rich and he plans to achieve this by any means necessary. Ceasar is in a constant position to either talk Chuy out of engaging in destructive schemes, or cleaning up after Chuy has already ruined something because of such feat.
- Chuy has a fascination and obsession over Pirates. He has been known to sometimes become a Pirate and randomly yell "Pirate, argh!".

== Episodes ==
The Pig	Ceasar brings a Pig into the studio to try to protect it from an evil meat-packing corporation. Chuy turns Ceasar in exchange for Bacon and coupons.
Energy Drinks	Chuy becomes addicted to energy drinks.
Reparations	Ceasar and Chuy try to help their friend Jerome to collect reparations for slavery.

== Holiday specials ==
Ceasar and Chuy have not yet featured Holiday specials, but Halloween and Christmas episodes are said to be in the works.

== Music videos ==
One of the key elements of the program is the inclusion of music videos, and their ruthless and irreverent critique of the artists and music featured on the videos, à la Beavis and Butt-head. Nothing is sacred: the performer, lyrics, or the production in general.

=== Criticism ===
The critiques of the music video are often censored by LATV due to the content of some of the content; however, Ceasar and Chuy have been known to speak the truth.

Ceasar and Chuy in most shows play a cultural music video, being a Mexican banda or a Puerto Rican orchestra. They really turn up their criticisms on these types of music videos.

=== Good music videos ===
Ceasar and Chuy absolutely love music videos that feature women in skimpy attire.

Reggaeton is another genre that gets Ceasar and Chuy to become heartless with their comments.

=== Music video interaction ===
Ceasar and Chuy are sometimes seen dancing or skating as the videos play.

== Controversy ==
Sometimes, the program gets into a little trouble by touching issues and/or saying things that may cause a reaction from their audience. In the "Touch My Horroscope" episode, the animated duo called Walter Mercado's hotline, only to find that their future was being gathered from Mercado's crystal balls, in which it was insinuated that it was referring to his genitalia.

== Other forms of media ==
- A Ceasar and Chuy DVD is currently in the works.
- Ceasar and Chuy ringtones, wallpapers, and mobile phone episodes are available through different sources.
- Film and distribution companies have expressed interest in the Ceasar and Chuy Movie.
