= UDC-TV =

- Washington, D.C.; United States
- Channels: Analog: RCN Channel 19 Comcast channel 98; Digital: Verizon FIOS channels 19 and 21

Programming
- Affiliations: Independent / Student Access; Classic Arts Showcase (overnights)

Ownership
- Owner: University of the District of Columbia

Links
- Website: UDC-TV Webpage

UDC-TV is an educational access television station based in Washington, D.C., the federal capital of the United States. It is owned and operated by the University of the District of Columbia. UDC-TV can be viewed anywhere within the UDC's campus, as well as any home or facility with cable TV service within the District of Columbia, including all hotels, federal and Congressional offices, as well as the White House.

== Programming ==
Locally produced programming from UDC-TV mainly focuses on health and family-related issues, as well as some locally produced educational programming. During the overnight hours and portions of the weekends, the station cablecasts programming from the Classic Arts Showcase.
