= WWTD-LD =

Television station in Washington, D.C.

- Washington, D.C.; United States
- Channels: Digital: 14 (UHF), shared with WMDO-CD; Virtual: 49

Programming
- Affiliations: see § Subchannels

Ownership
- Owner: J. Christopher Blair; (DC Broadcasting, Inc.)
- Sister stations: WRZB-LD

History
- First air date: October 31, 2001
- Former call signs: W63BP (1990–1995, 2001–2004); DW63BP (expired CP, 1995–2001); WWTD-LP (2004–2011)
- Former channel numbers: Analog: 63 (UHF, 1990–2005), 49 (UHF, 2005–2011)
- Former affiliations: Independent (1990–1995, 2001–2004, 2006–2007); Dark (1995–2001, 2004–2006, 2009–2013); MTV Tr3́s (2007); WUFO TV Network (2007–2008); ABC (via WJLA-TV, 2008–2009); QVC (2013–2014); SSN (2014–2016); MBC America (2016–2019)

Technical information
- Licensing authority: FCC
- Facility ID: 189114
- Class: LD
- ERP: 15 kW
- HAAT: 174.9 m (574 ft)
- Transmitter coordinates: 38°56′24″N 77°4′53″W

Links
- Public license information: LMS

WWTD-LD (channel 49) is a low-power television station in Washington, D.C.. The station is owned by DC Broadcasting, Inc. (which itself is owned by Christopher Blair of Denver, Colorado), and is sister to WRZB-LD.

== History ==
The station was granted its initial construction permit in 1990. At the time, it was owned by Robert E. Kelly of Annandale, Virginia, and was licensed to Annapolis, Maryland, with the call sign W63BP. The station never made it to air; the permit, initially scheduled to expire in January 1991, was extended multiple times through 1995. At that point, the FCC denied a further request for extension, the permit expired, and the station was deleted from the FCC database. The construction permit was again applied for and granted in 2001, and W63BP signed on October 31. Immediately, the station applied to move to channel 49 from the WRC-TV tower in northwest Washington; the construction permit was granted in February 2004. In 2005, Kelly sold both W63BP and dormant W61BY (now WRZB-LD) to DC Broadcasting, Inc. for $10.

Channel 49 went back on the air in 2006. It was the flagship station of the WUFO TV Network, which was on the air for nine months during 2007–2008. The network was funded and programmed by Mike Gravino. The WUFO TV Network aired an eclectic mix of "alternative knowledge" programming, including information about UFOs, crop circles, alternative history, new science, alternative religion, environmental and social activism, human potential and sci-fi, until August 10, 2008, when the network stopped over-the-air broadcasts.

WWTD-LP was then leased to Allbritton Communications Company, who turned it into an analog relay of local ABC affiliate WJLA-TV in late October 2008. However, that lease and the ABC transmissions ended on February 9, 2009. After WJLA's lease on WWTD expired, WWTD went dark.

Before the digital transition, WWTD-LP was granted a construction permit for a corresponding digital signal on channel 38. The station was later displaced by WMAR-TV to channel 14, as any low-power station must move if a full-power station wants its channel allocation. WWTD-LP flash-cut to digital as WWTD-LD on July 19, 2011, in order to reuse its existing antenna and transmitter.

The station added two channels from Luken Communications beginning February 1, 2015: Retro TV on channel 49.4 and Rev'n on 49.5.

== Subchannels ==
Subchannels of WWTD-LD and WMDO-CD
License	Subchannel	Res.	Short name	Programming
WWTD-LD
WWTD-LD	49.2	480i	HSN2	HSN2 (4:3)
WWTD-LD	49.3	480i	QVC2	QVC2 (4:3)
WWTD-LD	49.4	480i	NTDTV	NTD America (4:3)
WWTD-LD	49.5	480i	SonLife	SonLife (4:3)
WWTD-LD	49.6	480i	ShopLC	Shop LC (4:3)
WMDO-CD	47.1	480i	LATV	LATV
