= WSVF-CD =

Television station in Harrisonburg, Virginia

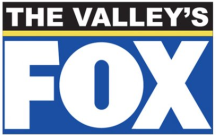

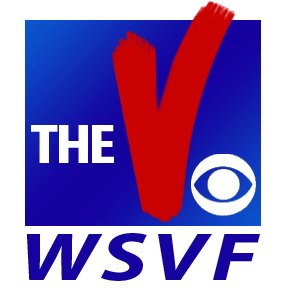
- Harrisonburg–Staunton, Virginia; United States
- City: Harrisonburg, Virginia
- Channels: Digital: 36 (UHF); Virtual: 43
- Branding: The Valley's Fox; CBS The V (43.2)

Programming
- Affiliations: 43.1: Fox; 43.2: CBS

Ownership
- Owner: Gray Media; (Gray Television Licensee, LLC)
- Sister stations: WHSV-TV; WSVW-LD

History
- Founded: October 30, 1995
- First air date: December 26, 1996 (as WAZT-CA repeater); October 26, 2006 (Fox programming, on WHSV-TV 3.2)
- Former call signs: W25CC (1996–1997); W25AZ (1997–2000); WAZM-LP (2000–2002); WAZM-CA (2002–2012); WSVF-CA (2012); WSVF-LD (2012–2013)
- Former channel numbers: Analog: 25 (UHF, 1996–2012); Digital: 43 (UHF, 2012–2020)
- Former affiliations: WAZT-CA repeater (on WSVF-CD, 1996–2012); Sportsman Channel (secondary overnights on WHSV-DT2, 2006–2009)
- Call sign meaning: We're Shenandoah Valley's Fox

Technical information
- Licensing authority: FCC
- Facility ID: 190915
- Class: CD
- ERP: 15 kW
- HAAT: 507.6 m (1,665 ft)
- Transmitter coordinates: 38°23′34.8″N 78°46′11.9″W

Links
- Public license information: Public file; LMS

WSVF-CD (channel 43) is a low-power, Class A television station in Harrisonburg, Virginia, United States, affiliated with Fox and CBS. It is owned by Gray Media alongside ABC affiliate WHSV-TV (channel 3) and low-powered dual NBC/CW+ affiliate WSVW-LD (channel 30). The three stations share studios on North Main Street/US 11 in downtown Harrisonburg, and operate a newsroom in Fishersville, serving Staunton, Waynesboro, and Augusta County. WSVF-CD's transmitter is located atop Massanutten Mountain. There is no separate website for WSVF-CD; instead, it is integrated with that of sister station WHSV-TV.

Even though WSVF-CD has a digital signal of its own, the low-power broadcast range only covers the immediate Harrisonburg area. Therefore, the CBS-affiliated CD2 feed is simulcast in 16:9 widescreen standard definition on WHSV's fifth digital subchannel in order to reach the entire market; this signal can be seen on channel 3.5 from a transmitter atop Elliott Knob west of Staunton.

== History ==
=== The Valley's Fox ===
The Fox affiliation currently seen on WSVF-CD began on October 26, 2006, with the launch of WHSV-DT2, a standard definition subchannel of WHSV-TV. The subchannel's launch gave the Shenandoah Valley its first full-time Fox affiliate; until then, WTTG, the Fox owned-and-operated station in Washington, D.C., served as the area's default Fox affiliate, though WHSV was a secondary Fox affiliate from 1994 through 1996. To this day, WTTG continues to be carried on Comcast systems in the Shenandoah Valley. During the late summer and early fall of 2006, WHSV underwent major technical upgrades to make way for the creation of WHSV-DT2. A large receiving tower was built behind its Harrisonburg studios to accommodate the additional satellite receiver needed for the Fox venture.

In March 2007, WHSV-DT2 was added to Comcast systems in the market on digital channel 705. Eventually, it moved to the current location on channel 192. The OTA high definition feed of WSVF-CD1 is available on channel 213.

=== Broadcast license ===
What is now WSVF-CD was started in 1996 as W25CC, operating on channel 25 as the Staunton and Waynesboro translator for WAZT-LP, a Woodstock-based religious independent station. It changed its call letters to W25AZ in 1997 and WAZM-LP in 2000, and upgraded to class A status in 2002 (as WAZM-CA). However, WAZM was all but invisible in the market because the area's cable companies wouldn't carry it. Cable and satellite are all but essential for acceptable television in the Shenandoah Valley, even more so because nearly all of this market is in the United States National Radio Quiet Zone. In April 2012, then-owner Jones Broadcasting announced it was selling WAZM-CA to Gray Television. Gray changed its callsign to WSVF-CA on June 4, 2012.

On June 1, 2012, Gray Television applied for and was granted a Notification of Suspension of Operations Request from the Federal Communications Commission (FCC), as Jones Broadcasting had no digital facilities built, and Gray preferred to relaunch the station as a digital-only operation clear of WAZM-LP's history (though it retains the license's previous history and FCC facility ID number). WAZM-CA's analog signal, operating at 21,900 watts, completely missed the major cities in the market, including its city of license. However, WSVF's digital signal covers virtually all of the market, and extends as far southeast as the adjacent market of Charlottesville.

On July 17, 2012, Gray Television signed an affiliation agreement with CBS for WSVF-LD and two other low-powered stations WECP-LD in Panama City, Florida, and WIYE-LP in Parkersburg, West Virginia. As a result, WSVF-LD became the CBS affiliate for the Shenandoah Valley in October 2012. It is the first time CBS programming has been seen on a Shenandoah Valley station since WHSV-TV (then WSVA-TV) dropped CBS programming in 1963; since then, WUSA in Washington, D.C. had served as the default CBS affiliate for the Shenandoah Valley. However, CBS programming is aired on the station's second digital subchannel, while the Fox programming previously seen on WHSV-DT2 airs on WSVF's primary channel. This is to provide a high-definition signal for Fox network programming to the Shenandoah Valley; technical limitations do not allow any of WHSV's subchannels outside of the main ABC signal to air in high definition. WSVF is the second full-time terrestrial network affiliate in the area; WHSV has had the market more or less to itself since it signed on in 1953. In February 2013, WSVF's class A status was transferred from the former analog channel 25 signal to the digital station.

Due to WSVF's link to WHSV, the same FCC must-carry rules that kept it off cable now forced its addition. The must-carry rules also give full-powered stations the option of retransmission consent, which allows these stations to request compensation from cable systems as a condition of carrying them. In this case, Gray has the right to require cable systems to carry WSVF as part of the compensation for carrying WHSV.

In early 2013, Gray won FCC permission to move the station's license to Harrisonburg.

== Newscast ==
WHSV currently produces a weeknight prime time newscast on WSVF-CD. Known on-air as The Valley's Fox 10 O'Clock News, the show can be seen for thirty minutes from a secondary set at the North Main Street facility. Although it features additional reporters seen on WHSV, the show maintains a dedicated news anchor and reporter. The broadcast primarily features news anchor Gloria Balding, meteorologist Aubrey Urbanowicz, and reporter Tim Wronka (also fill-in news anchor). MyNetworkTV/MeTV affiliate WHSV-DT4 simulcasts the prime time newscast. Even if the program is delayed or preempted on WSVF-CD, it still airs in the regular time slot on WHSV-DT4. WSVF-CD does not simulcast any of WHSV's newscasts.

WSVF-CD2 carries a simulcast of WHSV's noon, 6 p.m., and 11 p.m. newscasts. Instead of local morning news, the station airs CBS' late night news program CBS News Roundup until 6 a.m., followed by a double-run of CBS News Mornings until CBS Mornings comes on the air at 7 a.m.

== Subchannels ==
The station's digital signal is multiplexed:

Subchannels of WSVF-CD
Subchannel	Res.	Short name	Programming
43.1	720p	FOX-HD	Fox
43.2	1080i	CBS-HD	CBS
