= WFDC-DT =

Television station in Arlington, Virginia

- Arlington, Virginia; Washington, D.C.; United States
- City: Arlington, Virginia
- Channels: Digital: 15 (UHF), shared with WDCW; Virtual: 14
- Branding: Univision 14 Washington D.C. Noticias N+ Univision Washington D.C. (newscasts)

Programming
- Affiliations: 14.1: Univision; 14.4: UniMás; for others, see § Subchannels

Ownership
- Owner: TelevisaUnivision; (UniMas D.C. LLC)

History
- First air date: April 3, 1993
- Former call signs: WTMW (1993–2001); WFDC (2001–2003); WFDC-TV (2004–2009)
- Former channel number: Analog: 14 (UHF, 1993–2009)
- Former affiliations: HSN (1993–1997); America's Store (1997–May 1999); Military Channel (May–June 1999); Panda Shopping Network (June–December 1999); AIN (December 1999–2001); Renaissance Network (2001–2002); TeleFutura (2002–2005)
- Call sign meaning: "Telefutura District of Columbia"

Technical information
- Licensing authority: FCC
- Facility ID: 69532
- ERP: 1,000 kW
- HAAT: 227 m (745 ft)
- Transmitter coordinates: 38°56′24″N 77°4′54″W

Links
- Public license information: Public file; LMS
- Website: www.univision.com/local/washington-dc-wfdc

WFDC-DT (channel 14) is a television station licensed to Arlington, Virginia, United States, broadcasting the Spanish-language Univision and UniMás networks to the Washington, D.C., area. Owned and operated by TelevisaUnivision, the station maintains studios on Constitution Avenue near the Capitol Building, and a transmitter in the Tenleytown section of Washington's northwest quadrant.

== History ==
=== Prior history of channel 14 in Washington ===
Channel 14 first signed on as WOOK-TV on March 5, 1963, as the first television station in the country aimed at the African-American demographic. WOOK's claim to fame was their teen-oriented dance show called Teenarama, which featured big-name acts such as James Brown and Marvin Gaye. In 1968, the station changed its call letters to WFAN-TV to match its co-owned radio station at 100.3 FM. From 1968 to 1972, channel 14 was the sister station to WMET-TV (channel 24) in Baltimore. Both stations were owned by United Broadcasting. On February 12, 1972, WFAN-TV went dark after accumulating financial difficulties and due to license hearings affecting its sister stations.

Channel 14 was back on the air in 1976 in the form of translator W14AA, relaying Central Virginia Educational Television Corporation's WNVT from Annandale, Virginia. CVETC attempted to have the full-powered channel 14 allocation moved to Fairfax, but this request caused controversy among District of Columbia elected officials and other interested applicants who argued that the city was under-served by local television. CVETC accepted the allocation of channel 56 to Fairfax as a compromise, and upon the sign-on of WNVC in June 1981 W14AA was no longer necessary. CVETC received special approval to broadcast Congressional hearings in the interim; later in the year, the station was sold to Los Cerezos Television Co., who converted it to an affiliate of the Spanish International Network (Univision's predecessor). This station moved to channel 48 in 1989 and is today WMDO-CD.

=== WFDC station history ===
In 1985, the channel 14 allocation was awarded to Theodore M. White's Urban Broadcasting Corporation. The plan was to enter the market of general independent stations, dominated by WTTG (channel 5) and WDCA (channel 20) and soon to be joined by WFTY (channel 50); Milton Grant, who founded WDCA, consulted White on programming acquisition. Although the station claimed to the Washington Post it was aiming to start operations in the spring of 1986, legal wrangling continued among competing applicants delayed sign-on.

It was a further seven years before WTMW signed on April 3, 1993, as a Home Shopping Network (HSN) affiliate. Barry Diller's Silver King Broadcasting, predecessor to HSN's broadcasting arm, USA Broadcasting, had taken a 45% stake in the station in 1989 in order to keep it afloat. Urban Broadcasting filed for Chapter 11 bankruptcy less than two years later, on July 3, 1995.

As part of WTMW's plan to emerge from bankruptcy, it agreed to begin broadcasting HSN's secondary network America's Store in 1997. A further dispute arose over this agreement. WTMW was originally licensed with an effective radiated power of 2,880 kilowatts. While testing its signal before sign-on, it was discovered that WTMW caused interference to local land mobile operations, a common problem for stations operating on channel 14 as the UHF land mobile band is immediately below it on the radio spectrum. The filters required to reduce out-of-band transmissions necessitated a permanent reduction in power to 2,541 kW. However, the Federal Communications Commission (FCC) granted WTMW authorization to sign on with 1,440 kW, half of the original power. There were further issues with the transmitting equipment due to failed klystrons; bankruptcy proceedings revealed WTMW broadcast for a "substantial amount of time" at just 360 kW, or one-eighth of the original power. HSN's agreement with WTMW required it to broadcast at its full authorized power to receive compensation from the network; over HSN's objections that Urban Broadcasting was not capable of remedying the transmitter issues, the court found that it was and allowed the agreement to stand. After emerging from bankruptcy, WTMW claimed that its interpretation of the contract set the power requirement at 1,271 kW (i.e., half of 2,541), and not 1,440 kW, which triggered another lawsuit with HSN over which was correct.

The lawsuits over the affiliation contract were decided in HSN's favor, and on May 10, 1999, White removed America's Store programming due to non-payment and began broadcasting the Military Channel without warning. Irate viewers flooded local cable companies, who were not aware of the change themselves, with phone calls. The Military Channel, similar in programming but unrelated to Discovery Communications' later cable channel of the same name, had broadcast to just one million cable homes since 1993, but underwent aggressive expansion through satellite carriage and leased access to cable networks starting in 1998. When this did not deliver viewers, the network spent most of 1999 beset by financial trouble; WTMW was its only documented over-the-air affiliate. After several deals to rescue its operations fell through, the Military Channel went dark for good in July. WTMW left the network early on June 12. White said to the Post that the military programming was deeply unpopular, and "people seemed to want shopping back on our channel". Shopping returned by way of the cable-based Panda Shopping Network, which had been newly acquired by pay-per-view operator TVN Entertainment Corporation.

WTMW became an affiliate of the American Independent Network (AIN), which primarily broadcast reruns of old sitcoms and infomercials, on December 20 of the same year. Without the fixed income from its HSN affiliation, however, Urban Broadcasting filed for Chapter 11 bankruptcy again in August 2000. Concurrently in December, Univision Communications bought all of USA Broadcasting's over-the-air stations including its 45% stake in WTMW.

After two years with AIN, WTMW switched to the locally-based "Renaissance Network" (a relaunch of National Empowerment Television) around its launch on January 15, 2001, which provided the same general-entertainment format mixed with current affairs and politics programming with conservative viewpoints. This was short-lived, as Univision Communications purchased WTMW outright along with the rest of Urban Broadcasting's assets in an April 2001 bankruptcy auction. Univision already had an established Washington affiliate, Entravision Communications' WMDO-CA, so the rechristened WFDC instead became a charter affiliate of Univision's new secondary network TeleFutura, now known as UniMás, on January 14, 2002.

This arrangement presented the obvious deficiency of Univision's primary network remaining on a low-power station that was not subject to must-carry rules. On January 1, 2006, Univision Communications entered into a 16-year joint sales agreement (JSA) with Entravision, in which Entravision agreed to cede the market's Univision affiliation to WFDC in return for taking over its operation and advertising sales. WMDO-CA switched networks to TeleFutura on the same day. WMDO-CD and WFDC were to remain with their respective networks until the agreement's expiration on December 31, 2021. The Univision affiliation continued on WFDC at the agreement's expiration; UniMás moved to WFDC's fourth digital subchannel on the same day after WMDO-CD lost transmitting facilities and went silent.

== News operation ==
After switching from TeleFutura to Univision, the station continued its news department. It broadcast six hours of news on weekdays and two hours of news on the weekends. On September 30, 2012, Buenos Días DC, the first Spanish-language morning news show in the Washington market, debuted. The show was produced by Silvana Quiroz, who is also the anchor sharing cameras with co-anchor Nestor Bravo. The morning news magazine ran from 6 a.m. to 7 a.m. On April 19, 2014, a weekend newscast debuted at 6 p.m. and 11 p.m. and ran through October 2015 and was similar to the weekday schedule. On March 1, 2014, the Univision Washington team was replaced. Anchor Mario Sol and sports anchor Oscar Burgos were laid off. After serving as both a news anchor and reporter for Univision's 6 p.m. newscast, María Rosa Lucchini transitioned to full-time White House reporting; months later, she resigned. Claudia Uceda, the 11 p.m. anchor for Univision Washington, later transitioned to full-time reporting. Shortly after, she resigned to become a Washington correspondent for the national newscast. Tsi-Tsi-Ki Félix replaced the entire team, leaving only Fanny Gutierrez, who at the time was on maternity leave, and months later, resigned from her duties. Edwin Pitti, who was hired as a reporter, was promoted to White House correspondent.

In late December 2015, Entravision canceled the morning newscasts of all of its stations in the United States (including Buenos Días DC). The last show aired December 7, 2015.

== Technical information ==
=== Subchannels ===
WFDC-DT and WDCW broadcast from a tower in northwest Washington.

Subchannels of WFDC-DT and WDCW
License	Subchannel	Res.	Short name	Programming
WFDC-DT	14.1	720p	WFDC-DT	Univision
WFDC-DT	14.2	480i	getTV	Great (4:3)
WFDC-DT	14.3	480i	GRIT	Grit
WFDC-DT	14.4	720p	UniMas	UniMás
WDCW	25.1	480i	WDVM-SD	WDVM-TV in SD (Independent)
WDCW	50.1	720p	WDCW-DT	The CW
WDCW	50.2	480i	Antenna	Antenna TV (4:3)

Subchannel broadcast with MPEG-4 video
Simulcast of subchannels of another station

=== Analog-to-digital conversion ===
WFDC shut down its analog signal, over UHF channel 14, on June 12, 2009, the official date on which full-power television stations in the United States transitioned from analog to digital broadcasts under federal mandate. The station's digital signal continued to broadcasts on its pre-transition UHF channel 15, using virtual channel 14.
