= DCTV (TV station) =

Station in Washington, D.C.

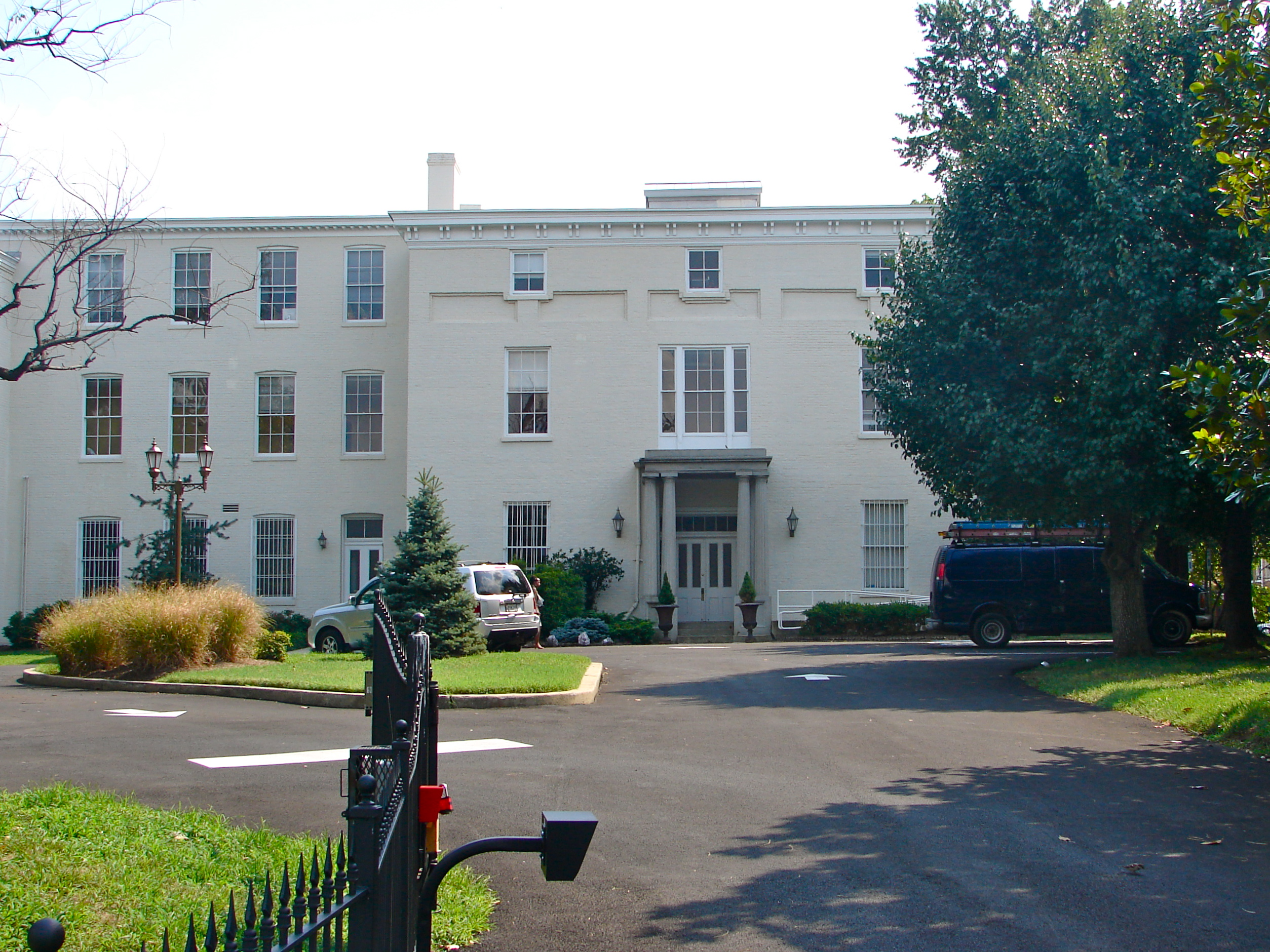
DCTV Station

DCTV, also known as Public Access Corporation of the District of Columbia, is a Washington, DC's television station dedicated completely to local programming created by and for DC and metropolitan area communities.

== History ==
Mayor Marion Barry and Cable Commissioner William Lightfoot used funds from Public, educational, and government access and Corporation for Public Broadcasting to develop DCTV as a powerful tool for public benefit, giving DC residents the means to create television programming. It was launched in 1988 as a single cable channel streaming from a small cubicle in the basement of a DuPont Circle apartment building. The currently headquarters are located in the Brooks Mansion in Brookland, and transmit 7 channels on Comcast, RCN and Verizon FiOS.

== Other services ==
DCTV produce local and original content for and from it community, and benefits it communities in other ways:

- Offering of accelerated media training courses, meeting rooms and access to state-of-the-art equipment including HD cameras, editing suites, and studios. DCTV programs are also streamed live, 24 hours a day, 7 days a week, accessed through DCTV.org.
- Listening and giving voice to diverse cultural groups and ideas, especially those that are under-represented in the media, empowering them to share their unique voices and to exercise their freedom of speech in an environment free of censorship or editorial control.
- Three online channels (live): DCTV (Comcast 95, RCN 10 and Verizon 10), Enrichment (Comcast 96, RCN 11 and Verizon 11) and Focus (Verizon 28).

== See also ==
- Media in Washington, D.C.
- Brookland (Washington, D.C.)
- Public, educational, and government access
- Corporation for Public Broadcasting
- PBS
- WHUT-TV
- WETA-TV
