= WNVT =

Television station in Spotsylvania Courthouse, Virginia

WNVT and WNVC

WNVT: Spotsylvania Courthouse (Note: Originally licensed to Goldvein, Virginia; moved to Spotsylvania Courthouse in 2018.)–Richmond, Virginia; WNVC: Culpeper (Note: Originally licensed to Fairfax, Virginia; moved to Culpeper in 2018.)–Charlottesville, Virginia; United States
- Channels for WNVT: Digital: 22 (UHF), shared with WCVE-TV; Virtual: 23.3
- Channels for WNVC: Digital: 26 (UHF), shared with WHTJ; Virtual: 41.3
- Branding: VPM World

Programming
- Affiliations: World Channel

Ownership
- Owner: VPM Media Corporation
- Sister stations: WCVE-TV; WCVW; WHTJ

History
- First air date: WNVT: March 1, 1972; WNVC: May 25, 1983
- Former channel number: WNVT: Analog: 53 (UHF, 1972–2003); Digital: 30 (UHF, 2003–2018), 42 (UHF, 2018–2020); Virtual: 30 (until 2018); WNVC: Analog: 56 (UHF, 1981–2008); Digital: 57 (UHF, 2004–2008), 24 (UHF, 2008–2018), 46 (UHF, 2018–2020); Virtual: 30 (until 2018)
- Former affiliations: WNVT: PBS (1972–2000); MuchMusic USA (2000–2003); Russian World TV (2003–2005); MHz Worldview (2005–2020); WNVC: MHz Worldview (until 2020)
- Call sign meaning: WNVT: Northern Virginia Television; WNVC: Northern Virginia College

Technical information
- Licensing authority: FCC
- Facility ID: WNVT: 10019; WNVC: 9999
- ERP: WNVT: 310 kW; WNVC: 300 kW
- HAAT: WNVT: 327.3 m (1,074 ft); WNVC: 335 m (1,099 ft)
- Transmitter coordinates: WNVT: 37°30′45.6″N 77°36′4.8″W; WNVC: 37°59′0″N 78°29′1″W

Links
- Public license information: WNVT: Public file; LMS; WNVC: Public file; LMS

WNVT (channel 23.3) is a non-commercial educational television station licensed to Spotsylvania Courthouse, Virginia, United States, serving the Richmond metropolitan area. The station's transmitter is located in the Richmond suburb of Bon Air in Chesterfield County. WNVT is operated in a pair with Culpeper-licensed WNVC (channel 41.3), which serves the Charlottesville area from a transmitter atop Carters Mountain. The two stations are owned by Richmond-based VPM Media Corporation, and broadcast programming from World Channel.

== History ==
=== Early history ===
WNVT first signed on March 1, 1972, on channel 53 as PBS member station "Northern Virginia Public TV". The station, licensed to Goldvein, was owned by the Northern Virginia Educational Television Association, which had been formed in 1965, and served the Virginia side of the Washington, D.C., television market. WNVT originally operated from Northern Virginia Community College. When the station was under construction, the school offered an associate of arts in broadcast engineering technology.

The Central Virginia Educational Television Corporation (later Commonwealth Public Broadcasting Corporation, now VPM Media Corporation) purchased the station in 1974.

As WNVT's transmitter was located in Independent Hill, Virginia, in rural Prince William County to the south of the Washington metropolitan area, reception in the more populated portions of Northern Virginia was difficult. Translator W14AA went on the air from Arlington in 1976 to increase coverage. WNVT began building WNVC in 1981, and received special permission to broadcast Congressional hearings over W14AA.

Fairfax-licensed WNVC signed on in May 1983 on channel 56, after being known as WIAH during the construction process. W14AA was sold in late 1981 and still broadcasts today as WMDO-CD. As the Washington market already had two full-service PBS stations in WETA-TV and WMPT, WNVC did not operate as a repeater of WNVT. Instead, it continued W14AA's coverage of Congress, along with State Department briefings, the Virginia General Assembly, county and local governments, school boards and fire districts. At the time, WNVC was billed as the only public television station independent of PBS in the nation.

On weekends in the late 1980s, WNVC had an unusual reputation for sports coverage. The station showed as many syndicated college basketball games as possible, including from the NCAA Division I men's basketball tournament in the era before every game was on national television. As there was generally only demand for Big East and Atlantic Coast Conference games in Washington, WNVC picked up games from major and minor conferences in other regions for relatively low cost. Its noncommercial status in turn freed it from the prospect of having to sell advertising for games that were likely to draw microscopic audiences. Director of development Mike Baker went on air during commercial breaks and halftimes with live appeals for donations. This stream of programming began to dry up in the early 1990s, when CBS and ESPN began national coverage of the entire tournament and increased coverage of regular-season games.

In 1993, a pledge drive featuring a week of foreign films generated unexpectedly high interest, convincing management there was an audience for foreign-language content. WNVC rebranded as "World View TV" on September 1, 1994, carrying international television programming in multiple languages and local ethnic programming on the weekends. At launch, the station's most popular program was the Russian state newscast Vremya, shown live at 9 p.m. Moscow Time (1 p.m. Eastern); it also aired Brazilian and Italian soccer, an in-studio celebration of Diwali in 1997, and some local programming, including a Spanish-language health call-in program. WNVT engaged in discussions throughout the 1990s to move its studios to Mary Washington College in Stafford County, but the move was scuttled in 1999 by rising costs, which had doubled in just two years.

WNVT continued as a standard PBS member station through 1999, though it did not air the network's evening programming. Beginning January 1, 2000, WNVT disaffiliated from PBS, reverting to an educational independent station during the day. WNVT also began relaying MuchMusic USA, an American spinoff of Canadian specialty channel MuchMusic, in afternoons and evenings.

=== MHz Networks ===
In 2001, the two stations became known as MHz Networks, with WNVC becoming MHz1 and WNVT becoming MHz2. WNVT's daily educational programming was branded as "MHz Learn", and it continued relaying MuchMusic USA in the evenings.

In 2003, WNVT became digital-only on channel 30 due to the cost of running both analog and digital signals simultaneously in its largely rural coverage area. The station dropped MuchMusic USA in 2003 for the Russian-language programming service "Russian World TV". The Russian programming was dropped in 2005.

WNVC signed on its digital signal on channel 57 later in 2004. On September 1, 2008, WNVC ceased broadcasting in analog permanently and took its digital signal silent temporarily to relocate to channel 24. Rather than continuing with their own programming lineups, the two stations placed a total of eight digital subchannels on their two signals, largely consisting of relays of international satellite channels. The lineup expanding to ten on June 12, 2009, and the current twelve on August 1, 2012. Both stations changed their virtual channel number to 30, with WNVC broadcasting 30.1 through 30.6 due to its better coverage of the Washington metropolitan area, and WNVT broadcasting 30.7 through 30.12.

MHz Networks' national multicast channel MHz Worldview was always carried on 30.1. The last set of channels included TRT World, CGTN America, CGTN Documentary, Africa Today TV, France 24, CNC World, Arirang, TeleSUR, Deutsche Welle, and Vietnet. Previous channels included NHK World, BVN, Al Jazeera English, Blue Ocean Network, SABC News International, NTA, Ethiopian Television, RT America, RT Spanish, VTV4, Euronews, CNC World, and TRT Türk. Two months before the end of broadcast operations in Washington, on February 1, 2018, RT America was dropped from WNVC's signal, apparently due to concerns that MHz Networks or CPBC would be required to register under the Foreign Agents Registration Act.

In 2013, Commonwealth Public Broadcasting Corporation spun off the MHz Networks unit and sold the WNVC and WNVT towers. CPBC remained in control of the stations' licenses, and MHz Networks programmed them under contract.

In 2015, MHz Networks launched a streaming video-on-demand service branded MHz Choice focusing on international dramas and mysteries with English subtitles where necessary. The service continued past the 2020 end of broadcast operations and was acquired by film distributor Kino Lorber in 2022; it is still in operation today.

=== Spectrum reallocation auction; relocation ===
CPBC announced on March 31, 2017, that it had sold the licenses of WNVC and WNVT in the Federal Communications Commission's ongoing spectrum reallocation auction for $182 million. CPBC did not see a need to continue running the two over-the-air signals, as the Washington market is already served by public television stations WETA-TV, WHUT-TV, and WMPT, and it would prefer to focus on local and PBS programming.

Both stations indicated they would continue over-the-air operations by sharing the channel of another station. CPBC stated it would attempt to find an in-market sharing partner, but was unable to do so, instead choosing to share with its own WCVE-TV in Richmond and its Charlottesville satellite WHTJ.

The two stations suspended operations from their existing transmitter sites in Independent Hill (WNVT) and Merrifield (WNVC) at midnight on March 31, 2018, and immediately moved to the transmitters of their respective sharing partners. The stations' cities of license were required to remain in the Washington market and moved to Spotsylvania Courthouse and Culpeper, respectively. Responsibility for programming the stations reverted to CPBC.

MHz Networks announced that it would move its twelve streams of programming to local cable operators. However, cable providers were not willing to carry the channels without the force of must-carry rules that apply to over-the-air stations, and MHz was unable to reach a deal to lease subchannels from another station. Consequently, MHz Worldview became unavailable over-the-air in the broadcaster's home market. The company has since announced it would shut down its over-the-air service on March 1, 2020. On February 3, WNVT and WNVC converted to being member stations of World Channel, a news/documentary network that is also aired on most PBS member stations.

== Subchannels ==
Subchannels of WCVE-TV and WNVT
License	Subchannel	Res.	Short name	Programming
WCVE-TV	23.1	1080i	VPM	PBS
WCVE-TV	23.2	480i	Create	Create
WCVE-TV	23.4	480i	Kids	PBS Kids
WCVE-TV	23.5	720p	VPMPlus	PBS (WCVW)
WNVT	23.3	480i	World	World Channel

Broadcast on behalf of another station

Subchannels of WHTJ and WNVC
License	Subchannel	Res.	Short name	Programming
WHTJ	41.1	1080i	VPM	PBS
WHTJ	41.2	720p	VPMplus	Simulcast of WCVW
WHTJ	41.4	480i	Kids	PBS Kids
WHTJ	41.5	480i	Create	Create
WNVC	41.3	480i	World	World Channel

== See also ==
- MHz Networks
- Powerhouse (1982 PBS and Nickelodeon kids and teens series produced by the station when branded as Northern Virginia ETV)
- Inside/Out (1972–73 series distributed by National Instructional Television, some episodes produced by WNVT/Northern Virginia ETV)
- List of independent television stations in the United States
- List of television stations in Washington, D.C.
