= LATV =

Spanish-language television network

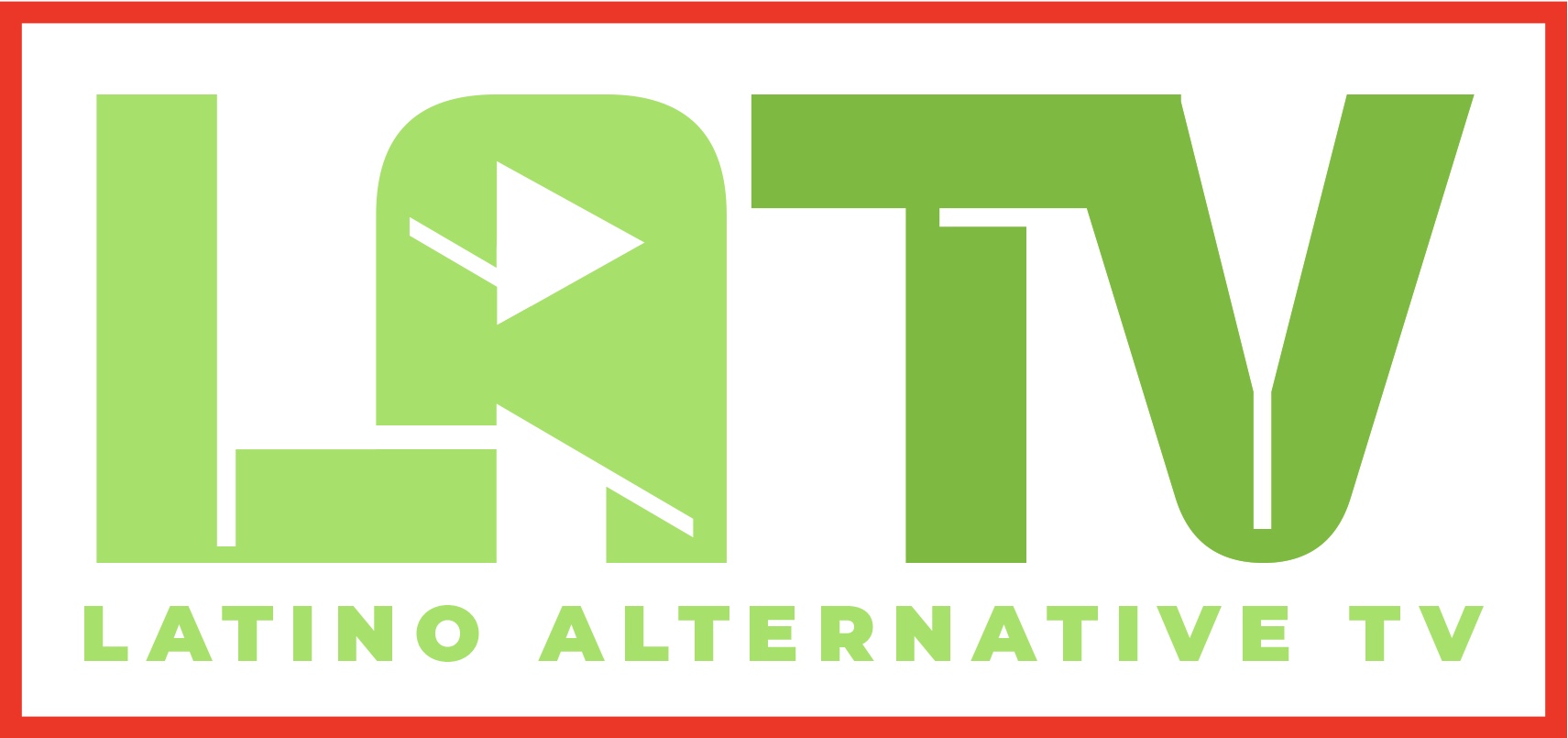
- Type: Bilingual broadcast television network (music, talk and variety series, children's programs)
- Country: United States
- Broadcast area: Nationwide via OTA digital television (covering 37% of the U.S.)
- Affiliates: List of affiliates
- Headquarters: Los Angeles, California

Programming
- Picture format: 720p (HDTV); 480i (SDTV)

Ownership
- Owner: LatiNation Media
- Parent: LATV Networks, LLC
- Key people: Bruno Seros-Ulloa (President, LATV Networks) Andres Palencia (CEO, LATV Networks)

History
- Founded: 2001; 25 years ago
- Launched: 2001; 25 years ago (in Los Angeles, on KJLA); April 23, 2007; 19 years ago (nationwide)
- Founder: Walter Ulloa

Links
- Website: latv.com

LATV (Spanish pronunciation: [laˈteβe]; originally pronounced on-air as from 2007 to 2014 and, since 2014, serving as a backronym for its on-air slogan, "Latino Alternative Television") is an American bilingual broadcast television network, digital publisher and media company owned by the LATV Networks division of LatiNation Media headquartered in Los Angeles, California. The network primarily carries original inclusive programming including music, talk and variety series aimed at Hispanic and Latino American teenagers and young adults between the ages of 18 and 55. From early on, LATV has characterized itself for featuring Latin Alternative musicians such as La Ley, Zayra Alvarez, Jaguares, Julieta Venegas, Enrique Bunbury, Ely Guerra, and Aterciopelados on its shows. LATV lost its ethos when Humberto Guida took over the programming and became another example of channel drift.

The network is available in many markets via the digital subchannels of broadcast television stations and on select cable providers throughout the United States and Puerto Rico through a local affiliate of the network (via a basic programming tier for main channel affiliates, and digital tiers for subchannel-only affiliates).

== History ==
LATV originated in 2001 as a programming format on KJLA (channel 57), an independent television station licensed to Los Angeles suburb of Ventura, California (which signed on in 1990 as KSTV-TV, a Galavisión affiliate), which mainly carried Spanish language programming as well as a limited amount of English language content. The format was an outgrowth of the station's nighttime and weekend programming, which it adopted in July 1998, following its disaffiliation from The WB (done to protect existing affiliate KTLA, after KJLA gained must-carry status on Los Angeles area cable providers); the remainder of the schedule at this time consisted of financial news programming and overnight programming from Shop at Home Network. As Los Angeles's first bilingual television station LATV focused on music in its flagship shows LATV Live and Mex 2 the Max. In 2003 the local network expanded its programming to a 24-hour schedule.

On November 22, 2006, Costa de Oro Television (founding owner of KJLA, which was purchased by the network's founder Walter Ulloa in 1994) announced that it would turn the LATV format into a full-fledged national network with a standardized schedule, resulting in the network becoming a competitor with established Spanish language networks such as Univision, Telemundo and Azteca América; as a result, Costa de Oro Television was subsequently renamed LATV Networks. The national LATV network launched on April 23, 2007, on 16 stations in media markets with heavy Latino/Hispanic populations. On May 22, 2007, LATV signed an affiliation agreement with Entravision Communications to carry the network on stations it owned or managed in 10 markets (including Boston, Denver; Albuquerque, Tampa-St. Petersburg and Washington, D.C.), including five of the 25 largest Hispanic markets in the U.S.

On August 20, 2007, Post-Newsweek Stations (now Graham Media Group) acquired a minority interest in network parent LATV Networks; as part of the acquisition, Post-Newsweek also signed an affiliation agreement to carry LATV on the digital subchannels of its television stations in Houston, Miami, Orlando and San Antonio (the company's stations in Jacksonville and Detroit were later added to the agreement); Post-Newsweek relinquished its interest in the network in 2013 to take general-interest English subchannel networks instead, with LATV moving its affiliations in most of the markets where the company owned stations to other full-power and low-power outlets.

In 2019 Andres Palencia and Bruno Seros-Ulloa assumed leadership of LATV as Co-Executive Directors expanding LATV's capabilities to include digital publishing on LATV.com and digital streaming.

On August 29, 2022 Entravision Communications announced a strategic partnership with LATV.

== Programming ==
LATV provides general entertainment programming to its affiliated stations weekdays from 9:00 a.m. to 3:00 a.m. and weekends from 1:30 p.m. to 3:00 a.m. Eastern Time, with paid and other brokered programming filling most other timeslots. The network airs a mix of original programs and series produced at LATV Studios located at 2323 Corinth ave. in Los Angeles. The network is fully bilingual and features shows focussing on Latino culture, Latina empowerment and LGBTQ+ Latinos.

Programs aired on the network include Rokamolé (a rock music video series with various Latin rock artists serving as guest hosts), La Casa TV (an hour-long lifestyle series), Locas por el Futbol (a weekly soccer review and discussion series hosted by a six-female panel), Almohadazo el Noti (a non-formal late-night news/talk show, hosted by Fernanda Tapia), En La Zona (an entertainment/talk show), Ponle Play (a daily music video series hosted by Caroline Lau), Las Supér 20 (consisting of two weekend music countdown series respectively featuring pop and Mexican Regional videos), Las Noches del LATV (a rebranded version of the Multimedios Television late-night variety series Las Noches del Fútbol) and Consejo Mundial de Lucha Libre (a weekend lucha libre wrestling series and the network's lone sports program).

Although the majority of LATV's programming is produced in Spanish, the network also carries a limited amount of program content produced either exclusively in English or in both languages including Latino TV, an interview series focusing on Latinos in entertainment, sports and art (similar in format to American Latino TV and LatiNation); and children's programs originally distributed for broadcast syndication by Telco Productions, a production company founded by host/television producer Alex Paen – which air for a half-hour on Sunday through Friday mornings and are intended to meet the three-hour weekly educational content requirements defined by the Federal Communications Commission's Children's Television Act. Since 2014, the network also simulcasts home shopping programming from Shop LC each night from 3:00 to 9:00 a.m. Eastern and Pacific Time, through a time brokerage agreement.

The network does not carry national morning and evening newscasts, nor does it carry first-run daytime programming on weekdays; the network instead carries day-behind encores of its evening and late-night programs as part of its daytime lineup on Monday through Fridays. The network's sole news program is Perspectiva Nacional, a Sunday evening political talk show produced by Entravision Communications (LATV had formerly produced a weeknight-only national newscast called Noticias LATV, which aired from 2010 to July 2012).

=== Talk/interview/lifestyle shows ===
- Glitterbomb w/ Patrick Gomez (2018)
- Get It Girl (2016–present)
- The Zoo (2016–present)
- American Latino TV (2019–present)
- Checkitow (2019–present)
- The Hub on LATV (2019–present)
- LatiNation (2019–present)
- The Q Agenda (2019–present)
- Pinkafe(2020–present)
- Checkitow (2019–present)
- Blacktinidad (2021 - present)
- Shades of Beauty (2022)

=== Music series ===
- LATV en Concierto (2007–present)
- Rokamolé (2012–present)
- Las Supér 20 (2012–present)
- Videos2Go (2015–present)

=== News programming ===
- Lo Que no Sabias (2014–present)
- Perspectiva Nacional (2013–present)

=== Sports programming ===
- Consejo Mundial de Lucha Libre (2007–present)
- LATV Fan Nation (2019–present)
- World Class Boxing (2016–present)

=== Children's programming ===
- Animal Rescue (2013–present)
- Biz Kid$ (2013–present)
- Dragonfly TV (2013–present)
- Dog Tales (2016–present)
- Think Big (2013–present)
- America's Heartland (2016–present)
- Soccer Academy (1999-present)

=== Former programming ===
==== Talk/interview shows ====
- American Latino TV (2007–2013)

==== Scripted series ====
- Ceasar and Chuy (2007–2008)

==== News programming ====
- Esto es Insolito (2010–2014)
- Noticias LATV (2010–2012)

== Affiliates ==
List of LATV affiliates
Media market	State	Station	Channel
Phoenix	Arizona	KPDF-CD	41.2
Tucson	Arizona	KWBA-TV	58.2
Yuma	Arizona	KAJB	54.2
Bakersfield	California	KXBF-LD	14.2
Coachella Valley	California	KEVC-CD	5.3
Fresno	California	KMSG-LD	39.1
Los Angeles	California	KXLA	44.1
Monterey	California	KSMS-TV	67.3
San Diego	California	KBNT-CD	17.2
San Francisco	California	KCNZ-CD	28.1
Santa Barbara	California	KPMR	38.3
Hartford-New Haven	Connecticut	WUVN	18.4
Denver	Colorado	KTFD-TV	50.2
Colorado Springs-Pueblo	Colorado	KVSN-DT	48.3
Washington	District of Columbia	WMDO-CD	47.2
Jacksonville	Florida	WUJX-LD	18.2
Miami	Florida	W16CC-D	16.3
Orlando	Florida	WOTF-TV	26.2
Tampa-St. Petersburg	Florida	WFTT-TV	62.2
West Palm Beach	Florida	WTVX	34.4
Atlanta	Georgia	WANN-CD	32.6
Chicago	Illinois	W31EZ-D	25.5
Boston	Massachusetts	WUTF-TV	27.2
Detroit	Michigan	WHNE-LD	14.1
Las Vegas	Nevada	KINC	15.2
Albuquerque	New Mexico	KTFQ-TV	41.2
Albany	New York	WYBN-LD	14.7
New York City	New York	WNWT-LD	51.2
Syracuse	New York	WWLF-LD	35.1
Oklahoma City	Oklahoma	KOHC-CD	45.2
Philadelphia	Pennsylvania	WZPA-LD	33.4
Aguadilla	Puerto Rico	WSJP-LD	30.5
Austin	Texas	KVAT-LD	17.2
Corpus Christi	Texas	KORO	28.3
Dallas-Fort Worth	Texas	KATA-CD	50.1
Dallas-Fort Worth	Texas	KTXD-TV	47.3
El Paso	Texas	KINT-TV	26.3
Harlingen-McAllen	Texas	KNVO	48.3
Houston	Texas	KUVM-CD	34.1
Laredo	Texas	KLDO-TV	27.2
Midland-Odessa	Texas	KUPB	18.2
San Antonio	Texas	KISA-LD	40.2
Salt Lake City	Utah	KULX-CD	10.3
Yakima	Washington	KWYT-DT	36.3
Milwaukee	Wisconsin	WIWN	68.4

== See also ==
- MTV Tres
- Nuvo TV
- UniMás
- Universo
