= WDCW =

Television station in Washington, D.C.

- Washington, D.C.; United States
- Channels: Digital: 15 (UHF), shared with WFDC-DT; Virtual: 50
- Branding: DCW 50

Programming
- Affiliations: 50.1: The CW; 50.2: Antenna TV; 25.1: WDVM-TV

Ownership
- Owner: Nexstar Media Group; (Tribune Media Company)
- Sister stations: WDVM-TV; Tegna: WUSA

History
- First air date: November 1, 1981
- Former call signs: WCQR (1981–1985); WFTY (1985–1995); WBDC-TV (1995–2006)
- Former channel numbers: Analog: 50 (UHF, 1981–2009); Digital: 51 (UHF, 2001–2009), 50 (UHF, 2009–2018)
- Former affiliations: Independent (1981–1995); Super TV (1981–1985); The WB (1995–2006)
- Call sign meaning: "Washington D.C.'s CW"

Technical information
- Licensing authority: FCC
- Facility ID: 30576
- ERP: 1,000 kW
- HAAT: 227 m (745 ft)
- Transmitter coordinates: 38°56′24″N 77°4′53″W

Links
- Public license information: Public file; LMS
- Website: www.dcnewsnow.com/watch-dcw50/

WDCW (channel 50), branded as DCW 50, is a television station in Washington, D.C., serving as the local outlet for The CW. It is owned by Nexstar Media Group alongside Hagerstown, Maryland–licensed WDVM-TV (channel 25), an independent station; Nexstar's Tegna subsidiary owns CBS affiliate WUSA (channel 9). WDCW and WDVM share studios on Wisconsin Avenue in Washington's Glover Park neighborhood. Through a channel sharing agreement with Univision station WFDC-DT (channel 14), WDCW transmits using WFDC's spectrum from a tower in the Tenleytown area of Washington's Northwest quadrant.

Channel 50 began broadcasting in November 1981 as WCQR, culminating a 17-year struggle to get the station on air that included the death of the original permittee, bankruptcy, and years in the FCC's comparative hearing process. The station launched primarily as a vehicle for subscription television (STV) programming from Super TV, which served the Washington and Baltimore areas. After the station was sold in 1985, it became WFTY and dropped the subscription content, operating as the Washington area's third independent station. After a foreclosure sale in 1993, it affiliated with The WB in 1995, improving its programming and market standing, and was sold to Tribune Broadcasting. WDCW was one of the charter affiliates of The CW in 2006. Over the years, the station has had several partial attempts at airing or producing local newscasts; the most recent, DC News Now, debuted in 2022.

== History ==
=== Pre-broadcasting history ===
The history of channel 50 in Washington, D.C., began in 1964 when the first application was received for the channel from All American Television Features, owned by record executive and conductor Mitch Miller. That application was joined by three others. Theodore (Ted) Granik had once hosted The American Forum of the Air, a debate program on NBC Radio; his Washington application was one of seven he planned nationwide, primarily in the northeastern U.S. O. Roy Chalk, then-owner of DC Transit, applied through his company, Transportation Communications of America. The Greater Washington Educational Television Association, owner of WETA-TV (channel 26), sought to establish channel 50 as a second educational channel. WETA dropped out of the channel 50 race when the Federal Communications Commission (FCC) moved channel 32 from Lock Haven, Pennsylvania, to Washington for non-commercial educational use, but a fourth applicant, Washington lawyer Vincent B. Welch, entered the proceeding under the banner of the Colonial Television Corporation.

Comparative hearings were held in January 1966. Though Miller did not exactly impress with his failure to recall the names of important D.C. public officials, he did enough to get the initial nod from examiner Basil P. Cooper, who lauded Miller's proposal to move to Washington, host a Saturday night program, and take an active hand in management. Miller, however, was bumped from the lead when the FCC review board opted to strike a different note. In a July 1967 decision, the board chose the application of Granik, a 29-year Washington resident, over that of Miller, a New York resident who would only have been at the station full-time during its start-up period. Miller and Chalk appealed the decision, but the full commission declined the appeals in March 1968.

Granik moved forward with his plans to house the station in the Sheraton Park Hotel, where WRC-TV had once been based until it built new facilities in 1958. Proposed programs had such titles including Women Want to Know, Report From Congress, and Washington People Speak. The call sign WGSP-TV was selected, for the owner and location—Granik and Sheraton Park.

While a September 1968 debut was announced, WGSP-TV never launched. On September 21, 1970, Granik died in New York; his obituary in The Washington Post stated that the station was to go on the air in late October. It was never to be. A failure to get financial backing led WGSP-TV to declare bankruptcy in May 1971; Theodore's son William declared of the station, "As of now, it's dead." Granik's estate did not include sufficient funding for the television station to start.

A trustee, Lee Cowan, was named in the bankruptcy case, and he found a buyer. Richard S. Leghorn of Sarasota, Florida, initially offered $15,000 for the permit; Leghorn then teamed up with Black telecommunications consultant Theodore S. Ledbetter Jr. to form Trans Community Broadcasting, which paid $45,500 at bankruptcy auction and awaited FCC approval of the transfer of license. Trans Community, which was 58 percent Black-owned, also sought approval from the FCC to broadcast subscription television (STV) programming.

The applications necessary to get WGSP-TV going would take years to materialize. In December 1974, Channel 50 Inc., a group owned by Ledbetter and the Model Cities Economic Development Corporation, filed with the FCC to acquire the construction permit from Cowan for $75,000 (equivalent to $489,626 in 2025). However, the STV portion of the Ledbetter consortium's plans caused another delay. At the time, the FCC had a policy of one STV service in a market, and WDCA-TV (channel 20) had also filed for authority for subscription broadcasts. In 1976, the two STV proposals and WGSP-TV's assignment of construction permit were consolidated in one hearing, with Channel 50 Inc.'s financial qualifications an issue in the proceeding. Channel 50 argued that Washington had enough broadcast television service and was large enough to provide sufficient free service with two STV stations, but WDCA-TV had established better financial backing.

The cases awaited hearing for more than three years, but the matter became moot when the FCC amended its STV policy in 1979 to permit multiple STV stations if the market had four or more conventionally operating TV stations. In July 1980, the FCC finally greenlit the assignment of the permit to Channel 50 Inc., and it also approved WGSP-TV's STV programming, which was initially to be provided by Teleprompter Corp., a cable television programmer and part-owner of Showtime. However, Teleprompter lost interest in over-the-air STV and helped Ledbetter, a former manager of WBNB-TV in the U.S. Virgin Islands, to find a replacement. A joint venture of Clint Murchison Jr. and Field Enterprises, Subscription Television of Greater Washington (STVGW), was formed to provide the STV service for WGSP-TV as well as $3 million in financing (equivalent to $11.7 million in 2025) to construct channel 50, which would go on the air in 1981.

=== WCQR ===
I'm not in it for the money. I'm in it because I'm a communicator who has had a difficult time getting stations to show my programs. We will see what people in the area come up with.

— Theodore Ledbetter, on WCQR's non-subscription programming

After a call sign change and the construction of facilities, channel 50 debuted on Washington screens on November 1, 1981, as WCQR. During the day, the programming was "freeform" in nature, with variety shows and eclectic fare from independent producers; there was little need to generate advertising revenue because of the STV lease. At night, WCQR offered Super TV, the subscription service from Subscription Television of Greater Washington. Super TV presented first-run movies, college basketball games, and an optional late-night adult service to paying subscribers; the base service cost $19.95 a month and came with a $49.95 installation charge.

Super TV got off to an uneven start; a computer problem caused some 20 percent of its 5,000 customers in the first month to not receive full service, while customer service phone lines were jammed. However, Super TV hit its stride quickly, with 45,000 subscribers in greater Washington by the summer of 1982 plus 10,000 more in Baltimore, where separately owned WNUV-TV signed on simulcasting Super TV's subscription programming. In 1983, Super TV peaked at 85,000 total subscribers, 55,000 in Washington and 30,000 in Baltimore. The freeform programming gave way in late 1983 to the Financial News Network, which signed channel 50 as its 14th affiliate. Prior to that, the station was airing a live camera feed of the skyline as seen from Alexandria, Virginia, largely because Super TV installers needed the station to broadcast a picture to aid in their work.

In late 1984, Independent American Broadcasters (IAB), a group headed by Nolanda Hill, filed to buy WCQR and a 50 percent stake in Super TV for $12 million (equivalent to $37.2 million in 2025) plus the assumption of $3 million in debt. The STV service was showing a profit, but the new ownership began to plan the station's transition to ad-supported commercial broadcasting. Hill noted that Ledbetter had gotten the station going but lacked the capital to move forward.

=== WFTY ===
On July 1, 1985, WCQR changed its call sign to WFTY. In late October, the station announced that Super TV would come to an end over channel 50 on January 1, 1986. Former Metromedia executive Allen Ginsberg was hired to supervise the purchasing of new programming and promotion for the new commercial independent station. Super TV continued on channel 54 in Baltimore until March 31, 1986, when it left the air as one of the last over-the-air STV services still in business.

The newly retooled WFTY stepped out into an independent television world in turmoil. Independent stations were becoming squeezed by high programming prices and a softening advertising market. The Post described its first full television season as "grueling". The station signed with Viacom for programs, but the station's plans to air I Love Lucy were dashed by competing independent WTTG, which decided to renew the show. By October, the station was owing $1.14 million on its $12 million, seven-year contract (equivalent to $35.2 million in 2025) with the company; Viacom took shows including Perry Mason, then the highest-rated program on WFTY, off the station's air. Further, two executives were replaced amid mismanagement charges that led to breach of contract lawsuits, and Hill moved her corporate headquarters from Dallas to the station's facilities in Rockville, Maryland, renaming the group from Hill Broadcasting to Corridor Broadcasting.

In 1990, WRC-TV made a proposal to WFTY to spend $1,000 a weeknight to program the 7:30 p.m. half-hour with a newscast, which it would produce and sell advertising for. The program, 7:30 News Headlines, debuted on January 14, 1991, anchored by Wendy Rieger and seeking to cater to an upscale audience. It was the first such news-share program ever announced and the second to air. (Note: Twelve days earlier, a similar newscast production agreement had started between WNEP-TV and WOLF in Scranton, Pennsylvania.) However, the newscast attracted worse ratings than the show it replaced, The Avengers. It was doomed by low ratings, a poor economy, and the Gulf War, with the start of that conflict scrambling local news viewing habits merely three days later; as a result, WRC-TV ended the arrangement effective October 25, 1991. The station also tried its hand at producing a local show on issues from a youth perspective, Kids Point of View Television.

Hill's broadcast stations would be mired in a series of financial issues in the early 1990s that ultimately led to a foreclosure on her two television properties. A November 1993 report in the Post revealed that Corridor Broadcasting had contributed thousands of dollars to Democratic political campaigns but owed the Federal Deposit Insurance Corporation (FDIC) $26 million (equivalent to $57.9 million in 2025). It also detailed ties between Hill and Ron Brown, then the United States Secretary of Commerce (and revealed to be her romantic partner after his death); a company named Harmon International, named after Brown's middle name, owned a small portion of channel 50's equipment and leased it to Hill. An executive with broadcasting industry analyst Paul Kagan Associates labeled WFTY as "in distress", claiming it had "never had a dime of cash flow"; it was attracting too small of an audience to show in ratings books, and it had reportedly lost money for multiple years running. The $26 million loan had belonged to Sunbelt Savings & Loan, a Dallas financial institution that failed; the FDIC refused to foreclose on the loan because it did not want to run a TV station.

The FDIC received a $3.1 million (equivalent to $6.91 million in 2025) offer for the failed loan from John and Barbara Foster of Fort Worth, Texas, through their Jasas Corporation. The Fosters specialized in acquiring businesses at foreclosure. They proceeded to foreclose on the note in August 1993 and have WFTY and WUNI in Worcester, Massachusetts, transferred to them; they paid Hill to continue managing the stations, an arrangement that later led to investigations by the FDIC inspector general and a House committee as to whether she illegally retained a financial interest after foreclosure. John Foster told the Post, "We've found a lot more problems than I ever anticipated and a lot more costs. I'm in the thing for substantially more money than I thought it was going to be." The Massachusetts station was sold in early 1995, but Jasas opted to hold on to WFTY after initially putting it on the market. Hill was later indicted in 1998 for siphoning more than $200,000 from Corridor and additional money from related companies, spending the money on shopping expenses; she received a four-month jail sentence in 1999.

=== WB and CW affiliations ===
WFTY joined The WB on February 20, 1995, six weeks after the network started broadcasting. The closest network affiliate to Washington was WJAL (channel 68) in Hagerstown, Maryland, which did not reach the District on cable or over-the-air. Since WB programming consisted of a single block on Wednesdays from 8 to 10 p.m. at the time, WFTY ran WB programs on six consecutive weeknights in order to catch up and begin airing new episodes in line with the network on March 1. The call sign was changed on September 6 to WBDC-TV to reflect the network affiliation; by this time, the station had also added substantial local sports programming with Washington Bullets basketball and Washington Capitals hockey telecasts produced by Home Team Sports.

In December 1995, Jasas contracted with Tribune Broadcasting, which owned a minority stake in The WB, to manage WBDC-TV in a seven-year deal. In 1999, Tribune bought the station outright from Jasas.

WDCW's CW logo, used from 2006 to 2008.

On January 24, 2006, the Warner Bros. unit of Time Warner and CBS Corporation announced that the two companies would shut down The WB and UPN and combine the networks' respective programming to create The CW; the day of the announcement, it was revealed that 16 of Tribune's 19 WB stations would be affiliated with the new network, including WBDC-TV. The call sign was changed to the present WDCW in advance of the network's September 2006 launch.

In 2010, WDCW debuted the hip-hop music program Direct Access with Big Tigger. This program was later syndicated to two other Tribune stations and WCIU-TV in Chicago. From 2007 to 2018, WDCW aired NewsPlus with Mark Segraves, a local news and culture magazine.

Tribune launched WDCW's first full-length newscast in 25 years in 2016, when a nightly half-hour 10 p.m. newscast debuted. The program was produced from WTVR-TV in Richmond, Virginia, which Tribune then owned, and featured local reporters and WTVR news presenters. With WTVR bound for purchase by the E. W. Scripps Company to address regulatory issues in the Richmond market from the company's sale to Nexstar, the newscast was canceled effective September 28, 2018.

=== Aborted sale to Sinclair; sale to Nexstar ===
Sinclair Broadcast Group, which owned WJLA-TV in the Washington market, entered into an agreement to acquire Tribune Media on May 8, 2017, for $3.9 billion (equivalent to $5.12 billion in 2025), plus the assumption of $2.7 billion in Tribune debt. Though it otherwise faced no regulatory issues involving the stations in the Washington television market itself, the deal received significant government scrutiny over Sinclair's forthrightness in its applications to sell certain conflict properties, prompting the FCC to designate it for hearing and leading Tribune to terminate the deal and sue Sinclair for breach of contract.

Following the Sinclair deal's collapse, Nexstar Media Group of Irving, Texas, announced its purchase of Tribune Media on December 3, 2018, for $6.4 billion (equivalent to $8.21 billion in 2025) in cash and debt. The sale was completed on September 19, 2019.

In the Washington, D.C., market, the Nexstar purchase united WDCW with WDVM-TV (channel 25), a former NBC affiliate for Hagerstown which had been converted into an independent station that specialized in hyperlocal news programs for specific areas of the Washington media market. In February 2020, the two stations' staffs were merged under common management by Nexstar.

=== DC News Now ===
On May 25, 2022, Nexstar announced that it would combine the operations of WDVM-TV and WDCW at the latter's Washington facility, where it had signed for an additional 29,000 square feet (2,700 m^{2}) of office space the year before, and move the production of WDVM-TV's newscasts there. Under the banner of DC News Now, the stations' combined and expanded news service would retain the existing WDVM-TV regional newscasts, with bureaus in Hagerstown; Frederick, Maryland; and Chantilly, Virginia. As part of the expansion, a 10 p.m. newscast would be started for air on WDCW.

DC News Now launched on July 11, 2022, over both stations with minimal publicity, debuting its first marketing campaign in early October. While an expansion for WDVM's existing news operation (with the bulk of newscasts using said brand on that station), it was treated as a de facto startup, with news director Ben Dobson hiring all of the operation's 80 additional staffers, many of whom were newcomers to the market.

In February 2024, WDCW became the television home for Loudoun United FC of the USL Championship. Matches air on both WDCW and WDVM.

Nexstar acquired Tegna—owner of CBS affiliate WUSA (channel 9) in the Washington market—in a deal announced in August 2025 and completed on March 19, 2026. The deal included approval for Nexstar to own three station licenses in markets such as Washington. A temporary restraining order issued one week later by the U.S. District Court for the Eastern District of California, later escalated to a preliminary injunction, has prevented WUSA from being integrated into WDCW and WDVM.

== Technical information ==
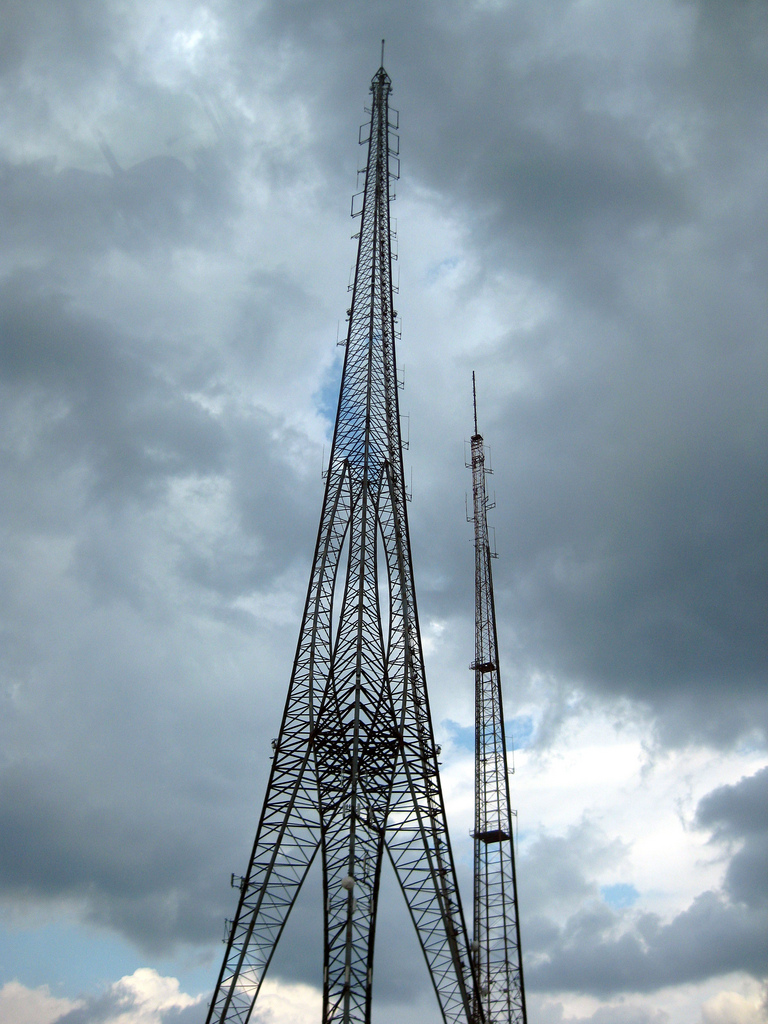
The Hughes Memorial Tower was used to transmit WDCW until the station sold its spectrum in 2017

=== Subchannels ===
WFDC-DT and WDCW broadcast from a tower in northwest Washington.

Subchannels of WFDC-DT and WDCW
License	Subchannel	Res.	Short name	Programming
WFDC-DT	14.1	720p	WFDC-DT	Univision
WFDC-DT	14.2	480i	getTV	Great (4:3)
WFDC-DT	14.3	480i	GRIT	Grit
WFDC-DT	14.4	720p	UniMas	UniMás
WDCW	25.1	480i	WDVM-SD	WDVM-TV in SD (Independent)
WDCW	50.1	720p	WDCW-DT	The CW
WDCW	50.2	480i	Antenna	Antenna TV (4:3)

Subchannel broadcast with MPEG-4 video
Simulcast of subchannels of another station

=== Analog-to-digital conversion and broadcast spectrum repack ===
WDCW stopped transmitting on its analog signal, over UHF channel 50, on June 12, 2009, the official date on which full-power television stations in the United States transitioned from analog to digital broadcasts under federal mandate. The station's digital signal relocated from its pre-transition UHF channel 51 to channel 50.

In April 2017, Tribune sold WDCW's broadcast spectrum to the FCC for $122 million as part of the commission's 2016–17 spectrum reallocation reverse auction. On August 31, 2017, it was announced that WDCW had entered into a channel sharing agreement with Univision affiliate WFDC-DT. WDCW ended broadcasts over its own channel 50 and began sharing WFDC's channel 15 on January 23, 2018.
