= WDDN-LD =

Television station in Washington, D.C.

- Washington, D.C.; United States
- Channels: Digital: 23 (UHF); Virtual: 23

Programming
- Affiliations: 23.1: Daystar; 23.2: Daystar Español; 23.3: Daystar Reflections

Ownership
- Owner: Daystar Television Network; (Word of God Fellowship, Inc.)

History
- Founded: November 18, 1988
- Former call signs: W42AJ (1988–1995); WSIT-LP (1995–1998); WKRP-LP (1998–2005); WDDN-LP (2005–2012)
- Former channel numbers: Analog: 42 (UHF, 1988–2003), 23 (UHF, 2003–2012)
- Former affiliations: Telemundo (1988–1995)
- Call sign meaning: Washington, D.C.'s Daystar Network station

Technical information
- Licensing authority: FCC
- Class: LD
- ERP: 10 kW
- HAAT: 203.3 m (667 ft)
- Transmitter coordinates: 39°0′0″N 77°3′25″W

Links
- Public license information: LMS
- Website: www.daystar.com

WDDN-LD (channel 23) is a low-power religious television station in Washington, D.C., owned by the Daystar Television Network. The station's transmitter is located on Brookville Road in Silver Spring, Maryland.

== History ==
Communicasting Corporation signed on W42AJ on November 18, 1988, as the Washington market's first Telemundo affiliate. When current affiliate W64BW (now WZDC-CD) signed on late 1993, the two stations were recorded as both carrying the network's programming.

The station, then known as WSIT-LP, was sold to Paxson Communications in 1996 and Capital Media in 1999. Capital Media assigned the famous callsign WKRP. WKRP-LP moved to channel 23 in 2003 in order to avoid interference from WVPY in Front Royal, Virginia. Daystar purchased the station in 2005.

== Subchannels ==
The station's signal is multiplexed:

Subchannels of WDDN-LD
Subchannel	Res.	Short name	Programming
23.1	1080i	Daystar	Daystar
23.2	720p	Espanol	Daystar Español
23.3	480i	Reflect	Daystar Reflections
