= WDVM-TV =

Television station in Hagerstown, Maryland

- Hagerstown, Maryland; Washington, D.C.; United States
- City: Hagerstown, Maryland
- Channels: Digital: 23 (UHF); Virtual: 25
- Branding: DC News Now

Programming
- Affiliations: 25.1: Independent; for others, see § Subchannels

Ownership
- Owner: Nexstar Media Group; (Nexstar Media Inc.)
- Sister stations: WDCW; Tegna: WUSA

History
- First air date: January 3, 1970
- Former call signs: WHAG-TV (1970–2017)
- Former channel numbers: Analog: 25 (UHF, 1970–2009); Digital: 55 (UHF, 2001–2009), 26 (UHF, 2009–2019)
- Former affiliations: NBC (1970–2016); Heroes & Icons (secondary, 2016–2019)
- Call sign meaning: West Virginia, District of Columbia, Virginia, Maryland

Technical information
- Licensing authority: FCC
- Facility ID: 25045
- ERP: 1,000 kW
- HAAT: 447.3 m (1,468 ft)
- Transmitter coordinates: 38°57′21.2″N 78°1′29″W
- Repeater: WDCW 25.1 (15.7 UHF) Washington, D.C.

Links
- Public license information: Public file; LMS
- Website: www.dcnewsnow.com

WDVM-TV (channel 25) is an independent television station licensed to Hagerstown, Maryland, United States, serving the Washington, D.C., television market. It is owned by Nexstar Media Group alongside CW outlet WDCW (channel 50); Nexstar's Tegna subsidiary owns CBS affiliate WUSA (channel 9). WDVM and WDCW share studios on Wisconsin Avenue in the Glover Park section of Washington; WDVM-TV's transmitter is located on Blue Mountain, east of Front Royal, Virginia.

== History ==
The station signed on the air as WHAG-TV on January 3, 1970. It was originally owned by Warren Adler along with WHAG radio in Halfway (AM 1410 and FM 96.7, now WDLD). WHAG-TV's original analog transmitter was to be on top of the Hagerstown Motor Inn (now the Alexander House) but was rejected due to structural incompatibility. A site on Fairview Mountain would become the location of the analog signal on UHF channel 25 on October 23, 1970. The station served as the NBC affiliate for Hagerstown, Maryland; network anchors Chet Huntley and David Brinkley welcomed the station to the network during their newscast that night.

Adler Communications sold WHAG-TV to Sheldon and Samuel Magazine of Washington, D.C., in 1973. The Magazine brothers then sold it to local aviation pioneer Richard Henson in 1977. Henson then sold the station to Great Trails Broadcasting in 1981. Great Trails then exited broadcasting and sold three of its stations–WHAG-TV; WFFT-TV in Fort Wayne, Indiana; and KSVI in Billings, Montana–to Quorum Broadcasting in 1998, for $65 million.

On September 8, 2003, Nexstar Broadcasting Group announced that it would acquire Quorum Broadcasting and its stations (including WHAG-TV) for $230 million. The sale was completed on December 31, 2003.

=== Loss of NBC affiliation ===
Former logo as WHAG-TV

Prior to 1996, the Federal Communications Commission (FCC) used Arbitron's Area of Dominant Influence (ADI) system to assign television stations to a media market, principally to determine cable carriage rights and applicable regulations and fees. Arbitron placed WHAG-TV in its own 192nd-ranked ADI consisting solely of Washington County, Maryland. After the passage of the 1992 Cable Act, which regulated cable carriage of broadcast stations, only cable systems in that county were required to carry WHAG-TV. That year, Arbitron ceased publishing television ratings and the commission switched to Nielsen's designated market area (DMA) system for market assignments, which combined Hagerstown with the far larger Washington, D.C., area to create a top-ten market. The terms of the Act thus required all in-market cable systems which could receive WHAG-TV over-the-air at their headends to add it; since the Act allows them to decline to carry multiple affiliates of the same network, they also had the option of dropping Washington's WRC-TV. Despite this change, WHAG-TV never saw itself as a Washington-market station; it applied for and received exemptions from FCC rules applying to large-market stations, such as expanded public file requirements. In practice it was only seen on cable west of the Blue Ridge, though Dish Network added it to its package of Washington-market local stations.

However, the fact remained that WHAG-TV was now technically competing with network-owned WRC-TV. The Herald-Mail first reported that NBC was declining to renew its affiliation with WHAG on February 19, 2016, and a network spokesperson confirmed this with a terse, one-sentence email to the paper. The station ceased broadcasting network programming on July 1. Beginning in 2014, NBC revoked affiliations from several affiliates, including WHAG-TV, WMGM-TV (whose broadcast area was served by network-owned WCAU), and KENV-DT (whose broadcast area was served by KSL-TV), that functioned as secondary NBC stations serving outlying areas of their larger markets. In addition to expanding local news, WHAG-TV also added programs from Heroes & Icons at the time.

=== As WDVM-TV ===
Former logo as WDVM-TV

On July 1, 2017, the station rebranded itself and adopted the call sign WDVM-TV. The change came after the station undertook the expansion of its cable carriage throughout most of the Washington, D.C., market, with news director Mark Kraham stating that "we wanted to make it clear that we're not just a Hagerstown station". The callsign had previously been used in the market by what is now WUSA (channel 9) from 1978 to 1986.

On December 3, 2018, Nexstar announced it would acquire the assets of Chicago-based Tribune Media—which has owned Washington-based CW affiliate WDCW (channel 50) since 1999—for $6.4 billion in cash and debt. The sale was approved by the Federal Communications Commission (FCC) on September 16, and was completed on September 19, 2019, forming a nominal duopoly with WDCW.

On July 1, 2019, all Heroes & Icons programming was dropped in favor of additional syndicated programming. Nexstar began repositioning WDVM-TV as a news-intensive independent station focused on the Washington market, first combining the operations of their two stations by bringing WDCW and WDVM-TV under the same management in February 2020. Later in the year, WDVM-TV added rebroadcasts of syndicated programming seen on WDCW, while that station added a standard-definition simulcast to allow over-the-air coverage of WDVM-TV to the entire market along with expanded cable and satellite carriage. In December 2023, Nexstar applied to the FCC to move WDVM-TV's transmitter site to a tower at Blue Mountain near Front Royal, Virginia, along with a power increase to 1,000 kW; the move was to substantially increase over-the-air coverage of Washington and suburban northern Virginia while still covering the Hagerstown area.

After the FCC requested several rounds of reports and technical changes to minimize the population in rural Maryland and Pennsylvania that would lose what the commission considers adequate local broadcast television coverage (within the Longley-Rice noise-limited contour of five full-power or Class A stations), the relocation was approved on February 12, 2024. The station relocated to its new tower on September 2, 2025.

Nexstar acquired Tegna—owner of CBS affiliate WUSA—in a deal announced in August 2025 and completed on March 19, 2026. The deal included approval for Nexstar to own three station licenses in markets such as Washington. A temporary restraining order issued one week later by the U.S. District Court for the Eastern District of California, later escalated to a preliminary injunction, has prevented WUSA from being integrated into WDCW and WDVM.

== News operation ==
Right from the start (January 3, 1970), WHAG began offering local newscasts with The Valley News which aired weeknights at 6, 7, and 11 p.m. The original anchors were Bob Witt with news, Glenn Presgraves with sports, and Bill Wolfinger forecasting the weather. Wolfinger also did a Saturday night horror movie show where he would be in costume similar to Lon Chaney. The news department expanded in 1972 to include weekend evening broadcasts at 11 that totaled six hours of local news per week. By the year 2000, news content increased to over 22 hours of broadcasts per week. In 1997, WHAG added a microwave truck allowing the transmitting of live breaking news from the viewing area. On February 12, 2010, the station switched its on-air and news brandings from "NBC 25" and NBC 25 News to "WHAG" and WHAG News, respectively.

Outside of a few senior staffers, the station's news department mainly acted as a "farm team" operation that features new journalists and behind the scenes staff who have graduated from their schools looking for experience at a small-market television station and serve as "one man band" personnel that shoot, write, and edit their own stories, and eventually move on to further opportunities in larger markets. The station operates a bureau on East Patrick Street (MD 144) in Frederick.

On August 30, 2010, WHAG added a half hour to its weekday noon and 5 p.m. newscasts. Until this point unlike most NBC affiliates in the Eastern Time Zone, the station had not aired a broadcast weeknights at 5:30. It still does not offer a full two-hour weekday morning newscast. There is now a half hour broadcast on Monday-Saturday nights at 7. On weekends, an hour-long morning show at 6 a.m. as well as a half hour Sunday morning broadcast at 9 p.m. were added. In addition, a Northern Virginia Bureau covering Chantilly, Leesburg, Berryville, and Winchester was opened. Although not a full news department, this is now the second local news operation established in those areas after TV3 Winchester launched on March 5, 2007. All of the preceding changes required the expansion of WHAG's personnel. On October 21, 2013, WHAG began broadcasting its local newscasts in high definition.

Nexstar undertook a major expansion of WDVM-TV's news operation that launched on July 1, 2016, the same day the station lost its NBC affiliation. While it broadcasts standard newscasts at 5:30 a.m., 6 a.m., noon, 5 p.m., 6 p.m., and 10 p.m., the 7 a.m., 7 p.m., and 11 p.m. hours are also set aside for Maryland- (I-270 News) and Northern Virginia–specific (Nova News) coverage. WDVM-TV also simulcasts Nexstar-owned WOWK-TV's Tonight Live at 5:30 p.m.

On July 11, 2022, Nexstar moved WDVM-TV's primary studios from Hagerstown to Washington and rebranded newscasts as DC News Now, along with changing many of the on-air personality and anchor lineups. The former studios in Hagerstown are now used as a bureau, alongside the existing Frederick and Chantilly bureaus. On July 25, another newscast expansion occurred, with the morning newscast expanding to four hours, the 5 p.m. newscast expanding to an hour (which also resulted in the move of the WOWK-produced Tonight Live to 11:30 p.m.), and the addition of a new 9 p.m. newscast. WDVM-TV's 10 p.m. newscast moved to WDCW and the 11 p.m. newscast was replaced by a half-hour sports program.

== Subchannels ==
The station's signal is multiplexed:

Subchannels of WDVM-TV
Subchannel	Res.	Short name	Programming
25.1	1080i	WDVM-DT	Main WDVM-TV programming
25.2	480i	ION Mys	Ion Mystery
25.3	480i	Rewind	Rewind TV
25.4	480i	Shop LC	Shop LC

WHAG-TV's broadcasts became digital-only, effective June 12, 2009.

As part of the spectrum repacking process following the FCC's incentive auction, WDVM changed from channel 26 to 23 on August 2, 2019. However, its virtual channel number remains 25.

WDVM-TV's main channel only is simulcast in 480i widescreen standard definition (virtual channel 25.1) on the Washington-based signal of WDCW in order to cover the central and eastern part of the market.

== Cable and satellite carriage ==
Recently, it has been added to the Dish Network lineup of local offerings and is available to subscribers that currently receive the Washington, D.C. market locals. WDVM-TV had also been seen on Dish as the default NBC affiliate for the Salisbury television market, as that market did not have an NBC affiliate of its own until June 2014, when WRDE-LD in nearby Rehoboth Beach, Delaware, switched its affiliation to NBC. It is also viewed in widescreen standard definition on Verizon FiOS in Montgomery County, Maryland.

On February 26, 2020, WDVM-TV was added to DirecTV's lineup of local offerings and, like with rival Dish, is also available to subscribers that currently receive the Washington, D.C. market locals. It is seen on channel 25 and only in high definition.
