= List of radio stations in Virginia =

The following is a list of FCC-licensed radio stations in the U.S. state of Virginia which can be sorted by their call signs, frequencies, cities of license, licensees, and programming formats.

== List of radio stations ==
Call sign	Frequency	City of License	Licensee	Format
WABN	1230 AM	Abingdon	Information Communications Corporation	Conservative Talk
WACL	98.5 FM	Elkton	iHM Licenses, LLC	Classic Rock
WAFX	106.9 FM	Suffolk	Tidewater Communications, LLC	Classic Rock
WAIW	92.5 FM	Winchester	Educational Media Foundation	Contemporary Worship (Air 1)
WAJL	1400 AM	South Boston	Linda Waller Barton	Southern Gospel/Bluegrass
WAKG	103.3 FM	Danville	Piedmont Broadcasting Corporation	Country
WAMM	790 AM	Mount Jackson	Shenandoah Valley Group, Inc.	Americana
WAMV	1420 AM	Amherst	Community First Broadcasters, Inc.	Southern Gospel/Talk
WARJ	102.5 FM	Shawsville	Educational Media Foundation	Contemporary Worship (Air1)
WARN	91.3 FM	Culpeper	American Family Association	Conservative Religious Talk (AFR)
WARV-FM	90.1 FM	Colonial Heights	Educational Media Foundation	Contemporary Christian
WAVA	780 AM	Arlington	Caron Broadcasting, Inc.	Religious Talk
WAVA-FM	105.1 FM	Arlington	Caron Broadcasting, Inc.	Religious Talk
WAWX	101.7 FM	Lynchburg	Educational Media Foundation	Contemporary Christian (K-Love)
WAXM	93.5 FM	Big Stone Gap	Valley Broadcasting and Communications, Inc.	Country
WAZR	93.7 FM	Woodstock	iHM Licenses, LLC	Contemporary Hit Radio
WBBC-FM	93.5 FM	Blackstone	Denbar Communications, Inc.	Country
WBBT-FM	107.3 FM	Powhatan	VPM Media Corporation	Eclectic/Public Radio
WBCM-LP	100.1 FM	Bristol	Birthplace of Country Music, Inc.	Classic Country/Americana
WBLB	1340 AM	Pulaski	WBLB, Inc	Southern Gospel/Black Gospel
WBLT	1350 AM	Bedford	3 Daughters Media, Inc.	News/Talk
WBOP	95.5 FM	Buffalo Gap	Liberty University, Inc.	Contemporary Christian
WBQB	101.5 FM	Fredericksburg	Centennial Licensing II, LLC	Hot Adult Contemporary
WBQK	107.9 FM	West Point	Davis Media, LLC	Country
WBRF	98.1 FM	Galax	Blue Ridge Radio, Inc.	Classic Country/Bluegrass/Americana
WBRG	1050 AM	Lynchburg	Tri-County Broadcasting, Inc.	News/Talk/Sports
WBRW	105.3 FM	Blacksburg	Monticello Media LLC	Active Rock
WBTJ	106.5 FM	Richmond	Audacy License, LLC	Urban Contemporary
WBTL	1320 AM	Ashland	Mobile Radio Partners, Inc.	Regional Mexican
WBTM	1330 AM	Danville	Piedmont Broadcasting Corporation	Adult Contemporary
WBTX	1470 AM	Broadway-Timberville	WBTX Radio, LLC	Southern Gospel
WCBX	900 AM	Bassett	CSN International	Conservative Religious
WCCA-LP	93.5 FM	Scottsville	Calvary Baptist Church	Conservative Religious
WCDX	92.1 FM	Mechanicsville	Radio One Licenses, LLC	Mainstream Urban
WCFC-LP	93.7 FM	Richmond	Crusade For Christ Temple Church of God in Christ	Religious Teaching
WCGX	1360 AM	Galax	Twin County Broadcasting Corporation	Oldies
WCHG	107.1 FM	Hot Springs	Pocahontas Communications Cooperative Corporation	Full Service/Freeform
WCHV	1260 AM	Charlottesville	Monticello Media, LLC	News/Talk
WCHV-FM	107.5 FM	Charlottesville	Monticello Media, LLC	News/Talk
WCNR	106.1 FM	Keswick	Tidewater Communications, LLC	Adult Album Alternative
WCNV	89.1 FM	Heathsville	Commonwealth Public Broadcasting Corporation	Public Radio
WCPK	1600 AM	Chesapeake	Hosanna Media Christian Group, Inc.	Spanish Contemporary Christian
WCVA	1490 AM	Culpeper	Piedmont Communications, Inc.	Classic Hits (WOJL)
WCVE-FM	88.9 FM	Richmond	Commonwealth Public Broadcasting Corporation	Public Radio
WCVL-FM	92.7 FM	Charlottesville	Tidewater Communications, LLC	Country
WCWM	90.9 FM	Williamsburg	The College of William & Mary in VA.	Variety
WCYK-FM	99.7 FM	Staunton	Monticello Media, LLC	Country
WDCE	90.1 FM	Richmond	University of Richmond	Variety
WDCT	1310 AM	Fairfax	KBC Broadcasting Inc.	Korean Religious
WDIC-FM	92.1 FM	Clinchco	Dickenson County Broadcasting Corporation	Classic Country
WDLK	90.9 FM	Woodlake	Redeemer Broadcasting, Inc.	Religious
WDVA	1250 AM	Danville	Mitchell Communications, Inc.	Black Gospel
WDXC	102.3 FM	Pound	WDXC Radio, Inc.	Country
WDZY	1290 AM	Colonial Heights	Richmond Christian Radio Corporation	Conservative Religious
WEBI-LP	100.5 FM	Woodlawn	Apple Enterprise, Inc.	Religious Teaching
WEHC	90.7 FM	Emory	Emory and Henry College	Public Radio
WEMC	91.7 FM	Harrisonburg	Board of Trustees of Eastern Mennonite University	Classical/Public Radio
WEPV-LP	104.1 FM	Hampton	St. Mary Star of the Sea Catholic Church	Catholic
WEQF-FM	105.3 FM	Dillwyn	Calvary Chapel of Lynchburg	Religious Teaching
WEQP	91.7 FM	Rustburg	Calvary Chapel of Lynchburg	Contemporary Christian
WERA-LP	96.7 FM	Arlington	Arlington Independent Radio	Variety
WESR	1330 AM	Onley-Onancock	Eastern Shore Radio, Inc.	Country
WESR-FM	103.3 FM	Onley-Onancock	Eastern Shore Radio, Inc.	Adult Contemporary/Oldies
WEVA	860 AM	Emporia	Colonial Media Corporation	Full Service
WFAJ	96.9 FM	Nassawadox	Hispanic Target Media, Inc.	Spanish
WFAX	1220 AM	Falls Church	Costa Media Boston LLC	Regional Mexican/Reggaeton
WFIJ-LP	93.9 FM	Rocky Mount	Lifestyle Health Education, Inc.	Christian
WFIR	960 AM	Roanoke	Mel Wheeler, Inc.	News/Talk
WFJX	910 AM	Roanoke	Mahon Communications, Inc.	News/Talk
WFLO	870 AM	Farmville	Heart of Virginia Communications	Full Service
WFLO-FM	95.7 FM	Farmville	Educational Media Foundation	Contemporary Christian (K-Love)
WFLS-FM	93.3 FM	Fredericksburg	Alpha Media Licensee, LLC	Country
WFOG-LP	95.9 FM	Hillsville	Pink Doors Media	Variety
WFOS	88.7 FM	Chesapeake	Hampton Roads Educational Telecommunications Association, Inc.	Variety
WFQX	99.3 FM	Front Royal	iHM Licenses, LLC	Classic Rock
WFTR	1450 AM	Front Royal	Royal Broadcasting, Inc.	Sports (FSR)
WFVA	1230 AM	Fredericksburg	Centennial Licensing II, LLC	News/Talk
WGCK-FM	99.7 FM	Coeburn	Letcher County Broadcasting, Inc.	Contemporary Christian (K-Love)
WGFC	1030 AM	Floyd	New Life Christian Communications, Inc.	Southern Gospel
WGFW	88.7 FM	Drakes Branch	God's Final Call & Warning, Inc.	Religious
WGH	1310 AM	Newport News	MHR License, LLC	Sports (FSR)
WGH-FM	97.3 FM	Newport News	MHR License, LLC	Country
WGMN	1240 AM	Roanoke	Stu-Comm, Inc.	News/Talk
WGPL	1350 AM	Portsmouth	Friendship Cathederal Family Worship Center, Inc.	Black Gospel
WGRQ	95.9 FM	Fairview Beach	Telemedia Broadcasting, Inc.	Classic Hits
WGRX	104.5 FM	Falmouth	Telemedia Broadcasting, Inc.	Country
WGTH	540 AM	Richlands	High Knob Broadcasters, Inc.	Southern Gospel/Religious
WGTH-FM	105.5 FM	Richlands	High Knob Broadcasters, Inc.	Southern Gospel/Religious
WGVY	1000 AM	Altavista	D.J. Broadcasting, Inc.	Oldies
WHAN	1430 AM	Ashland	Stu-Comm, Inc.	Adult Album Alternative
WHAP	1340 AM	Hopewell	Gee Communications, Inc.	Classic Country
WHBG	1360 AM	Harrisonburg	Tidewater Communications, LLC	Sports (ESPN)
WHCE	91.1 FM	Highland Springs	Henrico County Schools	Contemporary Hit Radio
WHEE	1370 AM	Martinsville	Martinsville Media, Inc.	Full Service
WHEO	1270 AM	Stuart	Patrick Community Media, Inc.	Classic Hits/Oldies
WHFV	107.1 FM	Shenandoah	Holy Family Communications	Catholic
WHFW	89.7 FM	Winchester	Christendom Educational Corporation	Catholic (WXDM)
WHHV	1400 AM	Hillsville	New Life Christian Communications, Inc.	Southern Gospel
WHKX	106.3 FM	Bluefield	First Media Services, LLC	Country
WHLF	95.3 FM	South Boston	Lakes Media, LLC	Adult Contemporary
WHLQ	105.5 FM	Lawrenceville	Hosanna Christian Media, Inc.	Black Gospel/Urban Contemporary
WHNK	1330 AM	Marion	Bristol Broadcasting Company, Inc.	Black Gospel
WHNQ	1140 AM	St. Paul	Bouldin Radio, LLC	Country
WHOV	88.1 FM	Hampton	Hampton University	Jazz/Urban Contemporary
WHRE	91.9 FM	Eastville	Hampton Roads Educational Telecommunications Association, Inc.	Public Radio
WHRF	98.3 FM	Belle Haven	Hampton Roads Educational Telecommunications Association, Inc.	Public Radio, Classical
WHRG	88.5 FM	Gloucester Point	Hampton Roads Educational Telecommunications Association, Inc.	Public Radio
WHRJ	89.9 FM	Gloucester Courthouse	Hampton Roads Educational Telecommunications Association, Inc.	Public Radio, Classical
WHRL	88.1 FM	Emporia	Hampton Roads Educational Telecommunications Association, Inc.	Public Radio
WHRO-FM	90.3 FM	Norfolk	Hampton Roads Educational Telecommunications Association, Inc.	Public Radio, Classical
WHRV	89.5 FM	Norfolk	Hampton Roads Educational Telecommunications Association, Inc.	Public Radio
WHRX	90.1 FM	Nassawadox	Hampton Roads Educational Telecommunications Association, Inc.	Public Radio
WHTE-FM	101.9 FM	Ruckersville	Monticello Media, LLC	Contemporary Hit Radio
WHUK	102.3 FM	Crozet	Monticello Media, LLC	Adult Hits
WIGO-FM	104.9 FM	White Stone	Two Rivers Communications, Inc.	Country
WINA	1070 AM	Charlottesville	Tidewater Communications, LLC	News/Talk/Sports
WINC	1400 AM	Winchester	Colonial Radio Group of Williamsport, LLC	News/Talk/Sports
WINC-FM	105.5 FM	Berryville	Euclid Avenue Properties, LLC	Hot Adult Contemporary
WIQO-FM	100.9 FM	Forest	3 Daughters Media, Inc.	Talk
WIQR	88.7 FM	Lexington	Virginia Tech Foundation, Inc.	Public Radio
WISE-FM	90.5 FM	Wise	Virginia Tech Foundation, Inc.	Public Radio
WJEV-LP	97.7 FM	Dale City	Ministerio De Vida	Spanish Religious
WJFK-FM	106.7 FM	Manassas	Audacy License, LLC	Sports (ISN)
WJFN	820 AM	Chester	Disruptor Radio LLC	Conservative Talk
WJFN-FM	100.5 FM	Goochland	MAGA Radio Network, LLC	Conservative Talk
WJFV	1650 AM	Portsmouth	Chesapeake-Portsmouth Broadcasting Corporation	Conservative Talk
WJHH-LP	94.1 FM	Rice	Back to Health and Healing Research Institute	Christian
WJJS	93.5 FM	Salem	iHM Licenses, LLC	Rhythmic Contemporary Hit Radio
WJJX	102.7 FM	Appomattox	iHM Licenses, LLC	Rhythmic Contemporary Hit Radio
WJLZ	88.5 FM	Virginia Beach	Virginia Beach Educational Broadcasting Foundation, Inc.	Contemporary Christian Hit Radio/Christian Rock/Christian Hip Hop
WJMA	103.1 FM	Culpeper	Piedmont Communications, Inc.	Country
WJNV	99.1 FM	Jonesville	Regina Kay Moore	Country
WJPN-LP	106.3 FM	Prince William	Pope John Paul the Great High School	Catholic
WJSR	100.9 FM	Lakeside	SM-WHTI, LLC	Urban Contemporary
WJVA-LP	106.5 FM	Portsmouth	Juneteenth Festival Company	Variety
WJVR	101.9 FM	Iron Gate	WVJT, LLC	Classic Rock
WJYK	980 AM	Chase City	Stephen C. Battaglia, Sr. & Janis G. Battaglia	Contemporary Christian/Religious
WJZU	1250 AM	Franklin	Franklin Broadcasting Corporation	Urban Gospel
WKAV	1400 AM	Charlottesville	Monticello Media, LLC	Contemporary Christian
WKBA	1550 AM	Vinton	Backroad Radio, LLC	Classic Country
WKBY	1080 AM	Chatham	Gloria Corporation	Black Gospel/Religious
WKCI	970 AM	Waynesboro	iHM Licenses, LLC	News/Talk
WKCW	1420 AM	Warrenton	Radio Companion Limited Liability Company	Classic Hits
WKCY	1300 AM	Harrisonburg	iHM Licenses, LLC	News/Talk
WKCY-FM	104.3 FM	Harrisonburg	iHM Licenses, LLC	Country
WKDE-FM	105.5 FM	Altavista	D.J. Broadcasting, Inc.	Classic Country
WKDV	1460 AM	Manassas	Metro Radio, Inc.	Regional Mexican
WKDW	900 AM	Staunton	iHM Licenses, LLC	Classic Country
WKGM	940 AM	Smithfield	WKGM, Inc.	Southern Gospel
WKHF	93.7 FM	Lynchburg	Lynchburg Media Partners, Inc.	Religious Talk
WKHK	95.3 FM	Colonial Heights	SM-WKHK, LLC	Country
WKJM	99.3 FM	Petersburg	Radio One Licenses, LLC	Urban Adult Contemporary
WKJS	105.7 FM	Richmond	Radio One Licenses, LLC	Urban Adult Contemporary
WKLR	96.5 FM	Fort Lee	SM-WKLR, LLC	Classic Rock
WKLV	1440 AM	Blackstone	Denbar Communications, Inc.	Oldies/Classic Hits
WKNV	890 AM	Fairlawn	Base Communications, Inc.	Southern Gospel
WKQB	102.9 FM	Pocahontas	West Virginia-Virginia Media, LLC	Hot Adult Contemporary
WKQY	100.1 FM	Tazewell	CSN International	Conservative Religious
WKSI-FM	98.3 FM	Stephens City	iHM Licenses, LLC	Contemporary Hit Radio
WKSK-FM	101.9 FM	South Hill	Lakes Media, LLC	Classic Hits
WKTR	840 AM	Earlysville	Piedmont Communications, Inc.	Classic Hits (WOJL)
WKWI	101.7 FM	Kilmarnock	Two Rivers Communications, Inc.	Classic Hits
WKYV	100.3 FM	Petersburg	Educational Media Foundation	Contemporary Christian (K-Love)
WLES	590 AM	Bon Air	Truth Broadcasting Corporation	Religious Talk
WLFV	98.9 FM	Midlothian	Educational Media Foundation	Contemporary Christian (K-Love)
WLGW	100.5 FM	Glade Spring	Educational Media Foundation	Contemporary Christian (K-Love)
WLGX	106.9 FM	Bedford	Educational Media Foundation	Contemporary Christian (K-Love)
WLGY	105.5 FM	Pennington Gap	Educational Media Foundation	Contemporary Christian (K-Love)
WLJV	89.5 FM	Spotsylvania	Educational Media Foundation	Contemporary Christian (K-Love)
WLLL	930 AM	Lynchburg	Hubbard's Advertising Agency, Inc.	Urban Gospel
WLMP-LP	102.7 FM	Fredericksburg	Calvary Chapel of Fredericksburg	Religious Teaching
WLNI	105.9 FM	Lynchburg	James River Media, LLC	News/Talk
WLOY	660 AM	Rural Retreat	Three Rivers Media Corporation	Oldies
WLQM-FM	101.7 FM	Franklin	Franklin Broadcasting Corporation	Full Service
WLRV	1380 AM	Lebanon	Psalm 68 Eleven Media, LLC	Southern Gospel
WLRX	106.1 FM	Vinton	Educational Media Foundation	Contemporary Christian (K-Love)
WLSD	1220 AM/92.5 FM	Big Stone Gap	Valley Broadcasting and Communications, Inc.	Classic Hits
WLTK	102.9 FM	New Market	Educational Media Foundation	Contemporary Christian (K-Love)
WLUR	91.5 FM	Lexington	Washington and Lee University	Public Radio/Variety
WLUS-FM	98.3 FM	Clarksville	Lakes Media, LLC	Country
WLVA	580 AM	Lynchburg	Brent Epperson	Talk
WLYH-FM	103.9 FM	Big Island	KSM Holdings, LLC	Classic Hits
WLZV	94.3 FM	Buckland	Educational Media Foundation	Contemporary Christian (K-Love)
WMAL-FM	105.9 FM	Woodbridge	Radio License Holdings LLC	Talk
WMBG	740 AM	Williamsburg	Williamsburg's Radio Station, Inc.	Adult Standards/Oldies/Classic Hits
WMEV-FM	93.9 FM	Marion	Bristol Broadcasting Company, Inc.	Country
WMJD	100.7 FM	Grundy	Peggy Sue Broadcasting Corporation	Classic Country
WMLU	91.3 FM	Farmville	Longwood University	Public Radio
WMNA	730 AM	Gretna	3 Daughters Media, Inc.	Sports
WMNA-FM	106.3 FM	Gretna	3 Daughters Media, Inc.	Talk
WMOV-FM	107.7 FM	Norfolk	iHM Licenses, LLC	Gold-based Contemporary Hit Radio
WMPW	970 AM	Danville	Lakes Media, LLC	Classic Country
WMQR	96.1 FM	Broadway	Tidewater Communications, LLC	Hot Adult Contemporary
WMRA	90.7 FM	Harrisonburg	James Madison University Board of Visitors	Public Radio
WMRL	89.9 FM	Lexington	James Madison University Board of Visitors	Public Radio
WMRY	103.5 FM	Crozet	James Madison University Board of Visitors	Public Radio
WMVA	88.9 FM	Painter	Friendship Cathedral Family Worship Center Inc.	
WMVE	90.1 FM	Chase City	Commonwealth Public Broadcasting Corporation	Public Radio
WMXH-FM	105.7 FM	Luray	Positive Alternative Radio, Inc.	Christian Hot Adult Contemporary
WNBV	88.1 FM	Grundy	Jewell Valley Railroad Inc.	Southern Gospel
WNDC	1190 AM	Leesburg		
WNIS	790 AM	Norfolk	Commonwealth Radio, LLC	News/Talk/Sports
WNLR	1150 AM	Churchville	New Life Ministries, Inc.	Religious Talk
WNNT-FM	107.5 FM	Warsaw	Real Media, Inc.	Country
WNOB	93.7 FM	Chesapeake	Commonwealth Radio, LLC	Adult Hits
WNOH	105.3 FM	Windsor	iHM Licenses, LLC	African American-oriented All-News
WNOR	98.7 FM	Norfolk	Tidewater Communications, LLC	Active Rock
WNRG	940 AM	Grundy	Peggy Sue Broadcasting Corporation	Southern Gospel
WNRN	1590 AM	Richmond	Stu-Comm, Inc.	Adult Album Alternative (WNRN-FM)
WNRN-FM	91.9 FM	Charlottesville	Stu-Comm, Inc.	Adult Album Alternative
WNRS-FM	89.9 FM	Sweet Briar	Sweet Briar College	Adult Album Alternative (WNRN-FM)
WNRV	990 AM	Narrows-Pearisburg	New River Interactive, LLC	Bluegrass
WNSB	91.1 FM	Norfolk	Norfolk State University Board of Visitors	Urban Alternative
WNTX	1350 AM	Fredericksburg	Alpha Media Licensee LLC	Silent
WNVA	1350 AM	Norton	Bristol Broadcasting Company, Inc.	Sports (ESPN)
WNVZ	104.5 FM	Norfolk	Audacy License, LLC	Rhythmic Contemporary Hit Radio
WODY	1160 AM	Fieldale	Positive Alternative Radio, Inc.	Southern Gospel
WOJL	105.5 FM	Louisa	Piedmont Communications, Inc.	Classic Hits
WOKD-FM	91.1 FM	Danville	Positive Alternative Radio, Inc	Christian Adult Contemporary
WOKG	90.3 FM	Galax	Positive Alternative Radio, Inc.	Christian Adult Contemporary
WOLD-FM	102.5 FM	Marion	Bristol Broadcasting Company, Inc.	Classic Rock
WOPI	1490 AM	Bristol	Holston Valley Broadcasting Corporation	Sports (ESPN)
WOTC	88.3 FM	Edinburg	Valley Baptist Church - Christian School	Conservative Religious
WOWI	102.9 FM	Norfolk	iHM Licenses, LLC	Mainstream Urban
WOWZ-FM	99.3 FM	Accomac	Chincoteague Broadcasting Corporation	Classic Country
WPAK	1490 AM	Farmville	White Pine Enterprises, Inc.	Positive Country
WPAR	91.3 FM	Salem	Positive Alternative Radio, Inc.	Christian Adult Contemporary
WPCE	1400 AM	Portsmouth	Friendship Cathederal Family Worship Center, Inc.	Gospel
WPER	90.5 FM	Fredericksburg	Positive Alternative Radio, Inc.	Christian Hot Adult Contemporary
WPIM	90.5 FM	Martinsville	Positive Alternative Radio, Inc	Christian Adult Contemporary
WPIN	810 AM	Dublin	Dublin Radio	Sports (ESPN)
WPIN-FM	91.5 FM	Dublin	Positive Alternative Radio, Inc.	Christian Adult Contemporary
WPIR	89.9 FM	Culpeper	Positive Alternative Radio, Inc.	Christian Hot Adult Contemporary
WPLY	1390 AM	Lynchburg	Mel Wheeler, Inc.	Sports
WPMH	1270 AM	Newport News	Chesapeake-Portsmouth Broadcasting Corporation	Christian Talk
WPRZ-FM	88.1 FM	Brandy Station	Praise Communications, Inc.	Religious
WPSK-FM	107.1 FM	Pulaski	Monticello Media LLC	Country
WPTE	94.9 FM	Virginia Beach	Audacy License, LLC	Hot Adult Contemporary
WPVA	90.1 FM	Waynesboro	Positive Alternative Radio, Inc.	Christian Adult Contemporary
WPWC	1480 AM	Dumfries-Triangle	Amin Segundo	Spanish Christian
WPZR	89.3 FM	Emporia	Positive Alternative Radio, Inc.	Christian Hot Adult Contemporary
WPZZ	104.7 FM	Crewe	Radio One Licenses, LLC	Urban Gospel
WQCN-LP	105.3 FM	Richmond	Faith & Love Fellowship Church	Urban Gospel
WQIQ	88.3 FM	Spotsylvania	Virginia Tech Foundation, Inc.	Public Radio
WQMZ	95.1 FM	Charlottesville	Tidewater Communications, LLC	Adult Contemporary
WQPO	100.7 FM	Harrisonburg	Tidewater Communications, LLC	Contemporary Hit Radio
WQSN	106.3 FM	Norton	Bristol Broadcasting Company, Inc.	Alternative Rock
WQSV-LP	106.3 FM	Staunton	Staunton Media Alliance	Adult Album Alternative
WRAA	1330 AM	Luray	Positive Alternative Radio, Inc.	Southern Gospel
WRAD	1460 AM	Radford	Monticello Media LLC	News/Talk (WRAD-FM)
WRAD-FM	101.7 FM	Radford	Monticello Media LLC	News/Talk
WRAR-FM	105.5 FM	Tappahannock	Real Media, Inc.	Hot Adult Contemporary
WRCW	1250 AM	Warrenton	Caron Broadcasting, Inc.	Talk (WWRC)
WREJ	990 AM	Richmond	Radio Richmond LLC	Urban Gospel
WREL	1450 AM	Lexington	First Media Radio, LLC	Classic Country
WREN-LP	97.9 FM	Charlottesville	Genesis Communications	Oldies
WRIC-FM	97.7 FM	Richlands	RR & WT Broadcasting, Inc.	Hot Adult Contemporary
WRIH	88.1 FM	Richmond	American Family Association	Conservative Religious Talk (AFR)
WRIQ	89.7 FM	Charles City	Virginia Tech Foundation, Inc.	Public Radio
WRIR-LP	97.3 FM	Richmond	Virginia Center for Public Press	Variety
WRJR	670 AM	Claremont	Stu-Comm, Inc.	Adult Album Alternative
WRKE-LP	100.3 FM	Salem	The Trustees of Roanoke College	Variety
WRLP	89.1 FM	Orange	Hartland Institute of Health and Education, Inc.	Religious
WRMV-LP	94.5 FM	Madison Heights	Fellowship Community Church and Christian Schools	Positive Country
WRNL	910 AM	Richmond	Audacy License, LLC	Sports (BetQL/ISN)
WROE-LP	95.7 FM	Roanoke	Radio Free Roanoke, Inc.	Variety
WROF-LP	95.7 FM	Floyd	Radio Free Floyd	Variety
WROV-FM	96.3 FM	Martinsville	iHM Licenses, LLC	Classic Rock
WROX-FM	96.1 FM	Exmore	Sinclair Telecable, Inc.	Alternative Rock
WRPC-LP	103.7 FM	Hampton	Peninsula Family Radio	Contemporary Christian
WRPK-LP	100.1 FM	Kilmarnock	Watershed Radio Project, Incorporated	Variety
WRTZ	1410 AM	Roanoke	Metromark Media LC	Oldies
WRVA	1140 AM	Richmond	Audacy License, LLC	News/Talk/Sports
WRVL	88.3 FM	Lynchburg	Liberty University, Inc.	Contemporary Christian
WRVQ	94.5 FM	Richmond	Audacy License, LLC	Contemporary Hit Radio
WRWK-LP	93.9 FM	Midlothian	Synergy Project, Inc.	Variety
WRXA-LP	95.7 FM	Rocky Mount	Rocky Mount Community Radio	Variety
WRXL	102.1 FM	Richmond	Audacy License, LLC	Alternative Rock
WRXT	90.3 FM	Roanoke	Positive Alternative Radio, Inc.	Christian Adult Contemporary
WSBV	1560 AM	South Boston	Logan Broadcasting, Inc.	Urban Gospel
WSHV	1370 AM	South Hill	Lakes Media, LLC	Urban Oldies
WSIG	96.9 FM	Mount Jackson	Tidewater Communications, LLC	Gold Based Country
WSLC-FM	94.9 FM	Roanoke	Mel Wheeler, Inc.	Country
WSLK	880 AM	Moneta	Smile Broadcasting, LLC	Adult Standards/Oldies
WSLQ	99.1 FM	Roanoke	Mel Wheeler, Inc.	Adult Contemporary
WSTV	104.9 FM	Roanoke	iHM Licenses, LLC	Adult Hits
WSVA	550 AM	Harrisonburg	Tidewater Communications, LLC	News/Talk/Sports
WSVO	93.1 FM	Staunton	iHM Licenses, LLC	Adult Contemporary
WSVS	800 AM	Crewe	Gee Communications Inc.	Classic Country/Bluegrass
WSWE-LP	92.7 FM	Sweet Briar	Sweet Briar College	Adult Album Alternative
WSWV	1570 AM	Pennington Gap	Bouldin Radio, LLC	Southern Gospel/Contemporary Christian
WTAR	850 AM	Norfolk	Sinclair Telecable, Inc.	Talk
WTJU	91.1 FM	Charlottesville	University of Virginia	Variety
WTNT	730 AM	Alexandria	Metro Radio, Inc.	Spanish Contemporary
WTON	1240 AM	Staunton	High Impact Communications Inc	Adult Album Alternative (WNRN-FM)
WTON-FM	94.3 FM	Staunton	High Impact Communications Inc	Adult Album Alternative (WNRN-FM)
WTOX	1480 AM	Bensley	Mobile Radio Partners, Inc.	Regional Mexican
WTPS	1240 AM	Petersburg	Radio One Licenses, LLC	Classic Hip Hop
WTRM	91.1 FM	Winchester	American Family Association, Inc.	Conservative Religious Talk (AFR)
WTTX-FM	107.1 FM	Appomattox	Positive Alternative Radio, Inc.	Southern Gospel
WTVR-FM	98.1 FM	Richmond	Audacy License, LLC	Adult Contemporary
WTWV-FM	92.9 FM	Suffolk	MHR License LLC	Yacht Rock
WTYD	92.3 FM	Deltaville	Davis Media, LLC	Adult Album Alternative
WTZE	1470 AM	Tazewell	CSN International	Christian Rock (Effect Radio)
WUDS-LP	94.9 FM	Woodstock	Massanutten Military Academy	Classic Top 40
WUKZ	1010 AM	Marion	Bristol Broadcasting Company, Inc.	Classic Hits
WULT	1540 AM	Sandston	Mobile Radio Partners, Inc.	Spanish CHR
WURA	920 AM	Quantico	Amin Segundo	Tejano
WURV	103.7 FM	Richmond	SM-WURV, LLC	Contemporary Hit Radio
WUSH	106.1 FM	Poquoson	Commonwealth Broadcasting, LLC	Country
WUSQ-FM	102.5 FM	Winchester	iHM Licenses, LLC	Country
WUVT-FM	90.7 FM	Blacksburg	Virginia Polytechnic Institute & State University	Freeform
WVAI-LP	101.3 FM	Charlottesville	Air Mix Virginia	Mainstream Urban
WVAX	1450 AM	Charlottesville	Tidewater Communications, LLC	Sports (FSR)
WVBB	97.7 FM	Elliston-Lafayette	Mel Wheeler, Inc.	Urban Adult Contemporary (WVBE-FM)
WVBE-FM	100.1 FM	Lynchburg	Mel Wheeler, Inc.	Urban Adult Contemporary
WVBW-FM	100.5 FM	Norfolk	MHR License LLC	Urban Adult Contemporary
WVBX	99.3 FM	Spotsylvania	Alpha Media Licensee LLC	Contemporary Hit Radio
WVCV	1340 AM	Orange	Piedmont Communications, Inc.	Country (WJMA)
WVEK-FM	102.7 FM	Weber City	Holston Valley Broadcasting Corporation	Classic Hits
WVES	101.5 FM	Chincoteague	Jackman Holding Company, LLC	Adult Hits
WVGM	1320 AM	Lynchburg	3 Daughters Media, Inc.	Sports (ISN)
WVHL	92.9 FM	Farmville	The Farmville Herald, Inc.	Country
WVKL	95.7 FM	Norfolk	Audacy License, LLC	Urban Adult Contemporary
WVLS	89.7 FM	Monterey	Pocahontas Communications Cooperative Corp.	Full Service/Freeform
WVNZ	1450 AM	Highland Springs	Mobile Radio Partners, Inc.	Spanish CHR
WVRI	90.9 FM	Clifton Forge	Liberty University, Inc.	Contemporary Christian
WVRS	90.1 FM	Gore	Point FM Ministries, Inc.	Southern Gospel
WVRU-FM	89.9 FM	Radford	Radford University	Public Radio
WVRX	104.9 FM	Strasburg	Point FM Ministries, Inc.	Southern Gospel
WVSP-FM	94.1 FM	Yorktown	MHR License LLC	Sports (ESPN)
WVST-FM	91.3 FM	Petersburg	Virginia State University	Variety
WVTF	89.1 FM	Roanoke	Virginia Tech Foundation, Inc.	Public Radio
WVTR	91.9 FM	Marion	Virginia Tech Foundation, Inc.	Public Radio
WVTU	89.3 FM	Charlottesville	Virginia Tech Foundation, Inc.	Public Radio
WVTW	88.5 FM	Charlottesville	Virginia Tech Foundation, Inc.	Public Radio
WVXL	100.7 FM	Christiansburg	Monticello Media LLC	Country
WVXX	1050 AM	Norfolk	Hindlin Broadcasting, LLC	Spanish Tropical
WWDE-FM	101.3 FM	Hampton	Audacy License, LLC	Adult Contemporary
WWDN	1580 AM	Danville	Lakes Media, LLC	Classic Hits
WWDW	107.7 FM	Alberta	Byrne Acquisition Group, LLC	Adult Hits
WWER	88.1 FM	Colonial Beach	Colonial Beach Community Radio	Community
WWIP	89.1 FM	Cheriton	Delmarva Educational Association	Contemporary Christian/Religious
WWLB	93.1 FM	Ettrick	VPM Media Corporation	Public Radio
WWND-LP	103.9 FM	White Stone	White Stone Radio Inc	Oldies/Carolina Beach
WWRE	105.1 FM	Bridgewater	Tidewater Communications, LLC	Classic Hits
WWSO-LP	99.7 FM	Hillsville	Hillsville Radio for Kids	Pre-Teen
WWTB	980 AM	Bristol	Bristol Broadcasting Company, Inc.	Rhythmic Contemporary
WWUZ	96.9 FM	Bowling Green	Alpha Media Licensee LLC	Mainstream Rock
WWVT	1260 AM	Christiansburg	Virginia Tech Foundation, Inc.	Public Radio, Classical
WWVT-FM	89.9 FM	Ferrum	Virginia Tech Foundation, Inc.	Public Radio, Classical
WWWT-FM	107.7 FM	Manassas	Washington DC FCC License Sub, LLC	All-News (WTOP-FM)
WWWV	97.5 FM	Charlottesville	Tidewater Communications, LLC	Classic Rock
WWZW	96.7 FM	Buena Vista	First Media Radio, LLC	Classic Hits
WXBQ-FM	96.9 FM	Bristol	Bristol Broadcasting Company, Inc.	Country
WXBX	95.3 FM	Rural Retreat	Three Rivers Media Corporation	Classic Hits
WXDM	90.3 FM	Front Royal	Christendom Educational Corporation	Catholic
WXEZ-LP	101.1 FM	Hillsville	Community Broadcasting of Hillsville	Adult Contemporary
WXGI	950 AM	Richmond	Radio One Licenses, LLC	Classic Hip Hop
WXGM	1420 AM	Gloucester	WXGM, Inc.	Oldies
WXGM-FM	99.1 FM	Gloucester	WXGM, Inc.	Adult Contemporary
WXJK	101.3 FM	Farmville	David W. Layne	Classic Rock
WXJM	88.7 FM	Harrisonburg	James Madison University Board of Visitors	Variety
WXLK	92.3 FM	Roanoke	Mel Wheeler, Inc.	Contemporary Hit Radio
WXLZ-FM	107.3 FM	Lebanon	Bouldin Radio, LLC	Country
WXMM-LP	100.1 FM	Galax	Golden West Media	Variety
WXRK-LP	92.3 FM	Charlottesville	Blue Ridge Free Media	Active Rock/Alternative Rock
WXTG	1490 AM	Hampton	TL Broadcasting LLC	Classic Soul/Urban Oldies
WXTG-FM	102.1 FM	Virginia Beach	Davis Media, LLC	Urban Contemporary
WXTJ-LP	100.1 FM	Charlottesville	Rector & Visitors of the University of Virginia	Variety
WXTR	89.9 FM	Tappahannock	Action, Inc.	Christian Talk
WXVA	610 AM	Winchester	Winchester Radio Broadcasters	Classic Hits
WYCS	91.5 FM	Yorktown	David Ingles Ministries, Inc.	Religious
WYFI	99.7 FM	Norfolk	Bible Broadcasting Network, Inc.	Conservative Religious
WYFJ	99.9 FM	Ashland	Bible Broadcasting Network, Inc.	Conservative Religious
WYFT	103.9 FM	Luray	Bible Broadcasting Network, Inc.	Conservative Religious
WYHR	101.5 FM	Vinton	Bible Broadcasting Network, Inc.	Conservative Religious
WYRV	770 AM	Cedar Bluff	Faith Communications, Inc.	Southern Gospel
WYTI	1570 AM	Rocky Mount	WYTI, Inc.	Full Service
WYTT	99.5 FM	Emporia	Byrne Acquisition Group, LLC	Mainstream Urban
WYVE	1280 AM	Wytheville	Three Rivers Media Corporation	Full Service
WYYD	107.9 FM	Amherst	iHM Licenses, LLC	Country
WZAP	690 AM	Bristol	RGH Communications Inc.	Religious
WZBB	99.9 FM	Stanleytown	Turner Media Group, Inc.	Country
WZFM	101.3 FM	Narrows	WZFM, LLC	Classic Hits
WZLV	90.7 FM	Cape Charles	Educational Media Foundation	Contemporary Christian (K-Love)
WZRV	95.3 FM	Front Royal	Royal Broadcasting, Inc.	Classic Hits
WZVA	103.5 FM	Marion	Bristol Broadcasting Company, Inc.	Contemporary Hit Radio
WZZU	97.9 FM	Lynchburg	Mel Wheeler, Inc.	Active Rock

== Defunct ==
- WBBL
- WBDB-LP
- WBDY
- WBTK
- WBVA
- WCLM-LP
- WDIC
- WDUF
- WFIC
- WFNR
- WHKT
- WJRX-LP
- WJYI
- WKEX
- WKEY
- WLEE
- WMVA
- WODI
- WORJ-LP
- WOWZ
- WPEX
- WPLI
- WPUV
- WPVC-LP
- WQLU
- WQMR-LP
- WRAP
- WRRW-LP
- WSVG
- WTJZ
- WVAB
- WXCF
- WXMY
- WXZR-LP

== See also ==
- Virginia media
  - List of newspapers in Virginia
  - List of television stations in Virginia
  - Media of cities in Virginia: Chesapeake, Hampton, Newport News, Norfolk, Richmond, Roanoke, Virginia Beach

== Bibliography ==
- Jack Alicoate, ed. (1939), "Virginia", Radio Annual, New York: Radio Daily, OCLC 2459636 – via Internet Archive
- "AM Stations in the U.S.: Virginia", Radio Annual Television Year Book, New York: Radio Television Daily, 1963, OCLC 10512375 – via Internet Archive

== Images ==
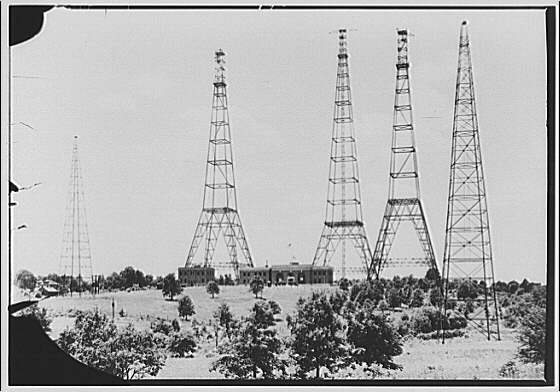
Radio towers, Arlington, Virginia, 20th c.

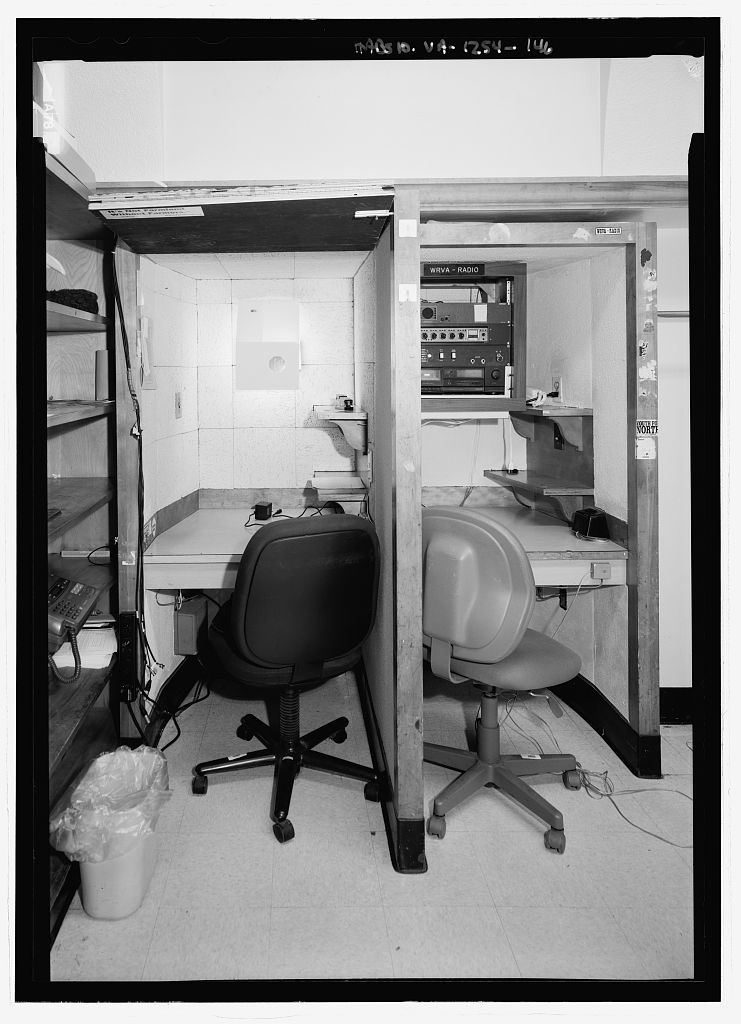
State Capitol radio press booth, Richmond, 2005

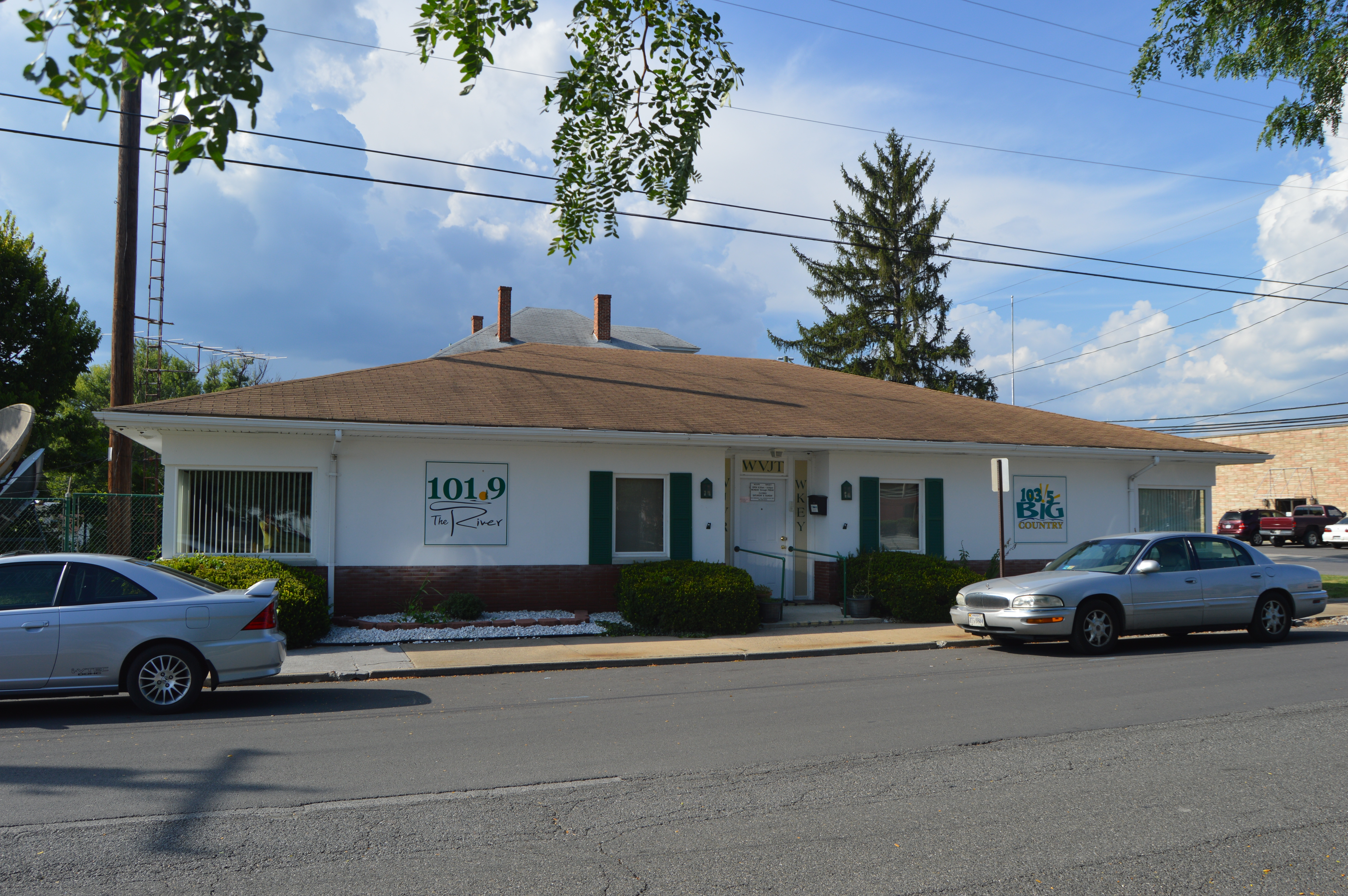
WJVR-WKEY, Covington, Virginia, 2016
