= WWEQ =

- Pamplin City, Virginia; United States
- Broadcast area: Pamplin City, Virginia
- Frequency: 90.5 MHz

Programming
- Affiliations: United News and Information

Ownership
- Owner: Calvary Chapel of Lynchburg
- Sister stations: WEQF-FM, WEQP

History
- First air date: 2010
- Last air date: July 21, 2016
- Former call signs: WEQP (2008–2015)

Technical information
- Facility ID: 176875
- Class: A
- ERP: 80 watts
- HAAT: 125 meters (410 ft)
- Transmitter coordinates: 37°12′7.0″N 78°41′31.0″W

WWEQ was a Religious-formatted broadcast radio station licensed to and serving Pamplin City, Virginia. WWEQ was owned and operated by Calvary Chapel of Lynchburg.

Calvary Chapel of Lynchburg surrendered WWEQ's license to the Federal Communications Commission on July 21, 2016, and the FCC cancelled the license the same day. The church continues to broadcast on WEQF-FM and WEQP.

== Translators ==
WWEQ increased its broadcast area with the use of the following translator:

Call sign	Frequency	City of license	FID	ERP (W)	HAAT	Class	FCC info
W237CL	95.3 FM	Lynchburg, Virginia		10	189.3 m (621 ft)	D	

W237CL, also owned by Calvary Chapel of Lynchburg, was a translator for WRXT.
