= WPIN =

WPIN can refer to:

- WPIN (AM), a radio station (810 AM) licensed to Dublin, Virginia, United States
- WPIN-FM, a radio station (91.5 FM) licensed to Dublin, Virginia, United States
