= WJFN =

WJFN may refer to:

- WJFN (AM), a radio station (820 AM) licensed to serve Chester, Virginia, United States
- WJFN-FM, a radio station (100.5 FM) licensed to serve Goochland, Virginia
- WFQY, a radio station (970 AM) licensed to serve Brandon, Mississippi, United States, which held the call sign WJFN from 2008 to 2012
- WCEH (AM), a radio station (610 AM) licensed to serve Hawkinsville, Georgia, United States, which held the call sign WJFN from 2004 to 2006
