= WLQM =

WLQM may refer to:

- WLQM-FM, a radio station (101.7 FM) licensed to serve Franklin, Virginia, United States
- WJZU, a radio station (1250 AM) licensed to serve Franklin, Virginia, which held the call sign WLQM from 1988 to 2019
