= WGTH =

WGTH could refer to two radio stations in United States:

- WGTH (AM), a radio station broadcasting at 540 kHz on the AM band, licensed to Richlands, Virginia
- WGTH-FM, a radio station broadcasting at 105.5 MHz on the FM band, licensed to Richlands, Virginia
