= WRAR =

WRAR may refer to:

- WRAR (AM), a defunct radio station (1000 AM) licensed to Tappahannock, Virginia, United States
- WRAR-FM, a radio station (105.5 FM) licensed to Tappahannock, Virginia, United States
