= WDIC =

WDIC may refer to:

- WDIC (AM), a defunct radio station (1430 AM) formerly licensed to serve Clinchco, Virginia, United States
- WDIC-FM, a radio station (92.1 FM) licensed to serve Clinchco, Virginia
