= WXGM =

WXGM may refer to:

- WXGM (AM), a radio station (1420 AM) licensed to serve Gloucester, Virginia, United States
- WXGM-FM, a radio station (99.1 FM) licensed to serve Gloucester, Virginia
