= WCRR =

WCRR may refer to:

- WCRR (FM), a radio station (88.9 FM) licensed to serve Manistique, Michigan, United States
- WNBL (FM), a radio station (107.3 FM) licensed to serve South Bristol, New York, United States, which used the call sign WCRR from 2007 to 2009
- WXBX, a radio station (95.3 FM) licensed to Rural Retreat, Virginia, United States, which used the call sign WCRR-FM from 1991 to 1994
- WLOY (AM), a radio station (660 AM) licensed to Rural Retreat, Virginia, United States, which used the call sign WCRR from 1985 to 2007
- WCRR world congress on railway research
- White Civil Rights Rally
