= WMVA =

WMVA may refer to:

- WMVA (FM), a radio station (88.9 FM) licensed to serve Painter, Virginia, United States; see List of radio stations in Virginia
- WMVA (AM), a defunct radio station (1450 AM) formerly licensed to serve Martinsville, Virginia
- WMVA, a video codec and early implementation of VC-1
