= WPVC-LP =

- Charlottesville, Virginia; United States
- Broadcast area: Charlottesville, Virginia; Albemarle County, Virginia
- Frequency: 94.7 MHz

Ownership
- Owner: Promise Land Communications

History
- First air date: September 20, 2015
- Last air date: June 16, 2020
- Call sign meaning: Progressive Voice of Charlottesville

Technical information
- Facility ID: 192897
- Class: L1
- ERP: 21 watts
- HAAT: 64.6 meters (212 ft)
- Transmitter coordinates: 38°4′39.0″N 78°28′21.0″W

WPVC-LP was a progressive talk radio and electronic dance music formatted low-power radio station licensed to Charlottesville, Virginia, serving Charlottesville and Albemarle County in Virginia. WPVC-LP was owned and operated by Promise Land Communications.

== History ==
On September 20, 2015, WPVC-LP first signed on the air for the first time.

In September 2019, Saga Communications, which operates the Charlottesville Radio Group under the Tidewater Communications licensee, filed a petition with the FCC requesting that WXRK-LP's license not be renewed. Saga claimed the station, along with other Charlottesville-based low-power FMs, were operating as "a de facto cluster". WXRK-LP station's founder Mike Friend called the petition to deny "'legal junk' and a deliberate 'misinterpretation' of FCC rules". F riend pointed to other attempts by Saga to shutter low-power FM stations within Saga markets.

Saga, in 2004, claimed that KFLO-LP in Jonesboro, Arkansas, was airing announcements that "sound suspiciously like commercials". Saga also petitioned the FCC to revoke the license of WLCQ-LP, a Christian station in the Springfield, Massachusetts, market, "for equipment violations" in 2015. In both cases, the FCC "admonished the station" but denied Saga's complaints.

Jeff Lenert, co-founder of WPVC-LP, said that "though [the stations] share a building" all of "the stations all operate separately, having only limited and largely incidental contact with each other". Lenert turned in the license for WPVC-LP on June 16, 2020, "As a result of the ongoing Coronavirus pandemic and recent increased costs of station ownership and operation, it has become impossible to operate station WPVC-LP in the manner that I wish." Lenert largely blamed the legal action by Saga Communications combined with a loss of sponsors during the pandemic for the signing off of that station. The station's license was deleted and its pending renewal dismissed on July 7 of the same year.

The FCC effectively denied the petition from Saga regarding WPVC, in a ruling for the license of WREN-LP, housed in the same building, filed on September 30, 2024. Saga's petition against WPVC was further denied on March 16, 2026 in a ruling against WXRK.
