= WKDE =

WKDE may refer to:

- WKDE-FM, a radio station (105.5 FM) licensed to Altavista, Virginia, United States
- WGVY, a radio station (1000 AM) licensed to Altavista, Virginia, which held the call sign WKDE from 1962 to 2018
