= WNRG =

WNRG could refer to:

- WNRG (AM), a radio station (940 AM) licensed to Grundy, Virginia, United States
- WNRG-LP, a radio station (107.9 FM) licensed to Palm Bay, Florida, United States
- WRXS, a radio station (106.9 FM) licensed to Brookfield, Wisconsin, United States, which held the call sign WNRG-FM from 2012 to 2021
