= WCVA =

WCVA may refer to:

- WCVA (AM), a radio station (1490 AM) licensed to Culpeper, Virginia, United States
- Wales Council for Voluntary Action
