= ESPN Radio 1430 =

ESPN Radio 1430 may refer to:

- ESPN Radio 1430 serving the Altoona, PA market
- ESPN Radio 1430 serving the Fresno, CA market
- ESPN Radio 1430 serving the Blacksburg, VA market
