= WOWZ =

WOWZ may refer to:

- WOWZ-FM, a radio station (99.3 FM) licensed to serve Accomac, Virginia, United States
- WOWZ-LD, a low-power television station (channel 33) licensed to serve Salisbury, Maryland, United States
- WVES (FM), a radio station (101.5 FM) licensed to serve Chincoteague, Virginia, which held the call sign WOWZ or WOWZ-FM from 2016 to 2017
- WOWZ (AM), a defunct radio station (1280 AM) licensed to serve Appomattox, Virginia
