= WKTR =

Simulcasting WOJL, Louisa
- Earlysville, Virginia; United States
- Broadcast area: Charlottesville, Virginia; Central Virginia
- Frequency: 840 kHz
- Branding: Classic Hits 105.5 and 95.3 Sam FM

Programming
- Format: Classic hits

Ownership
- Owner: Piedmont Communications, Inc.
- Sister stations: WOJL, WCVA, WVCV

History
- First air date: February 17, 1991

Technical information
- Licensing authority: FCC
- Facility ID: 73191
- Class: D
- Power: 8,200 watts daytime only
- Transmitter coordinates: 38°15′57.0″N 78°24′53.0″W
- Translator: 105.5 W288ED (Charlottesville)

Links
- Public license information: Public file; LMS
- Webcast: Listen Live
- Website: 1055samfm.com

WKTR (840 kHz) is a classic hits formatted broadcast radio station licensed to Earlysville, Virginia, serving Charlottesville. WKTR is owned by Piedmont Communications, Inc.

== History ==
Baker Family Stations, then doing business as Rural Radio Service, was first issued a construction permit for 840 kHz in September 1986. WKTR signed on February 17, 1991, with a religious talk format. The station is a rimshot daytimer with a transmitter located near Stanardsville, Virginia.

By 2005, the station was still running religious talk under the branding "The Ministry Station". That March 1, it became the Charlottesville market's first ESPN Radio affiliate under the branding "ESPN 840 Charlottesville".

In 2010–11, WKTR flipped twice more: first to Southern gospel by joining the Joy FM network on June 30, 2010, then to country in a simulcast of WBNN-FM (105.3 MHz) in Buckingham County the next January 1.

Baker donated WKTR, by then valued at just $120,000, to CSN International on October 15, 2015.

CSN sold WKTR to Piedmont Communications, Inc. in 2022 for $10,000. WKTR now simulcasts the classic hits format originating at Piedmont's WOJL (105.5 FM) in Louisa. At the same time, Piedmont purchased the under-construction FM translator W288ED in Charlottesville, also on 105.5 FM, and assigned it to WKTR to function as co-channel booster for WOJL's programming in the city.
