= Whee =

Whee may refer to:

- Whee (album), a 2022 extended play by South Korean singer Wheein
- Whee (app), a social media app by ByteDance
- WHEE, a radio station in Virginia, United States
