= WXRK =

WXRK may refer to:

== Current ==
- WXRK-LP, a radio station (92.3 FM) licensed to Charlottesville, Virginia, United States

== Past ==
- WINS-FM, a radio station (92.3 FM) licensed to New York, New York, United States, which carried the WXRK callsign from 1985 to 2006 and 2007 to 2012
- WKRK-FM, a radio station (92.3 FM) licensed to Cleveland, Ohio, United States, which carried the WXRK callsign from 2006 to 2007
