= WXRK-LP =

- Charlottesville, Virginia; United States
- Broadcast area: Metro Charlottesville; Albemarle County, Virginia
- Frequency: 92.3 MHz
- Branding: Rock Hits 92-3

Programming
- Format: Active rock; Alternative rock

Ownership
- Owner: Blue Ridge Free Media

History
- First air date: September 7, 2015
- Call sign meaning: A hat tip to the former WXRK-FM in New York

Technical information
- Licensing authority: FCC
- Facility ID: 192547
- Class: L1
- ERP: 21 watts
- HAAT: 63 meters (207 ft)
- Transmitter coordinates: 38°4′39.5″N 78°28′20″W

Links
- Public license information: LMS
- Webcast: Listen Live
- Website: 923xrk.org

WXRK-LP is an active rock and alternative rock formatted radio station licensed to Charlottesville, Virginia, serving Charlottesville and Albemarle County, Virginia. It is owned and operated by Blue Ridge Free Media.

== History ==
WXRK-LP signed on the air on September 7, 2015. The call sign for the station was previously held by former rock station WXRK-FM in New York City. From its outset, the station has aired a combination of active rock and alternative rock.

In September 2019, Saga Communications, which operates the Charlottesville Radio Group under the Tidewater Communications licensee, filed a petition with the FCC requesting that WXRK-LP's license not be renewed. Saga claimed the station, along with other Charlottesville-based low-power FMs, were operating as "a de facto cluster". The station's founder Mike Friend called the petition to deny "'legal junk' and a deliberate 'misinterpretation' of FCC rules". Friend pointed to other attempts by Saga to shutter low-power FM stations within Saga markets.

Saga, in 2004, claimed that KFLO-LP in Jonesboro, Arkansas, was airing announcements that "sound suspiciously like commercials". Saga also petitioned the FCC to revoke the license of WLCQ-LP, a Christian station in the Springfield, Massachusetts, market, "for equipment violations" in 2015. In both cases, the FCC "admonished the station" but denied Saga's complaints.

Jeff Lenert, co-founder of then-progressive talk station WPVC-LP, said that "though [the stations] share a building" all of "the stations all operate separately, having only limited and largely incidental contact with each other". Lenert turned in the license for WPVC-LP on June 16, 2020, "As a result of the ongoing Coronavirus pandemic and recent increased costs of station ownership and operation, it has become impossible to operate station WPVC-LP in the manner that I wish." Lenert largely blamed the legal action by Saga Communications combined with a loss of sponsors during the pandemic for the signing off of that station. A similar petition from Saga seeking regarding the license of WREN-LP, housed in the same building, was largely denied in September 2024 but resulted in a short-term license renewal for that station and a consent decree regarding impermissible underwriting announcements.

On March 16, 2026, the FCC and Blue Ridge Free Media entered into a consent decree, similar to the one with WREN-LP, and granted the station a short-term license renewal. The FCC also, again, denied Saga's petition.
