= WGGM =

WGGM may refer to:

- WGGM-LP, a low-power radio station (90.5 FM) licensed to serve Fort Myers, Florida, United States
- WJFN (AM), a radio station (820 AM) licensed to serve Chester, Virginia, United States, which held the call sign WGGM until 2014
