= WKMZ =

WKMZ may refer to:

- WKMZ (FM), a radio station (103.3 FM) licensed to serve Salem, West Virginia, United States
- WKMZ-LP, a defunct low-power radio station (96.5 FM) that was licensed to serve Ruckersville, Virginia, United States
- WLTF, a radio station (97.5 FM) licensed to serve Martinsburg, West Virginia, which held the call sign WKMZ from 1981 to 2001 and WKMZ-FM from 2017 to 2019
- WLDB, a radio station (105.3 FM) licensed to serve Mukwonago, Wisconsin, United States, which held the call sign WKMZ from 2008 to 2011
