= WNNT-FM =

Radio station in Warsaw, Virginia

- Warsaw, Virginia; United States
- Broadcast area: Northern Neck
- Frequency: 107.5 MHz
- Branding: River Country 107.5

Programming
- Format: Full-service and country
- Affiliations: ABC News Radio; Premiere Networks

Ownership
- Owner: Real Media, Inc.
- Sister stations: WRAR-FM

History
- Founded: July 3, 1949
- First air date: March 1, 1967
- Former frequencies: 100.9 MHz (1967–2008)
- Call sign meaning: Northern Neck and Tidewater Broadcasting (original owner)

Technical information
- Licensing authority: FCC
- Facility ID: 49025
- Class: A
- ERP: 6,000 watts
- HAAT: 100 meters (330 ft)
- Transmitter coordinates: 37°56′39″N 76°45′5″W

Links
- Public license information: Public file; LMS
- Webcast: Listen live
- Website: realradio804.com

WNNT-FM (107.5 FM) is a country music-formatted radio station licensed to Warsaw, Virginia, United States, serving the Northern Neck. WNNT-FM is owned and operated by Real Media, Inc. The station's studios are located in Tappahannock with sister station WRAR-FM 105.5.

== History ==
Grayson Headley, trading as the Northern Neck and Tidewater Broadcasting Company, received a construction permit from the Federal Communications Commission to build a new 250-watt daytime-only AM station, broadcasting on 690 kHz, at Warsaw on July 6, 1948. Construction had begun by early 1949 on a site near the Cobham Park Baptist Church; the station would be an independent outlet concentrating on local interest programs. WNNT launched July 3, bringing the first radio station to the Northern Neck. Charles E. Stuart, a partner in the project, became part-owner of WNNT in 1950 and then died in 1951, at which time Headley became sole owner again.

In 1961, Grayson Headley, who also owned a loan company and a construction firm in the region and sat on the board of directors of the Virginia Association of Broadcasters, died at the age of 46; his widow, Patricia, became the owner, one of only a handful of single women to own broadcast stations. Under her ownership, WNNT doubled its service to the Northern Neck on March 1, 1967, when WNNT-FM, originally at 100.9 MHz, signed on, simulcasting the AM frequency during the day and continuing its programming after dark. In 1973, the stations began to broadcast a country music format. After Patricia married Pat Dewey, the Northern Neck and Tidewater Broadcasting group expanded in 1975 with the launch of a station on the lower Northern Neck, WKWI at Kilmarnock; the Kilmarnock station was built as a partnership with Dean Loudy, former WNNT general manager and morning personality.

The WNNT stations were sold for $400,000 to Linwood "Lynn" Wadsworth in 1993. In 1999, Wadsworth and the then-owner of WWTL (700 AM) in Walkersville, Maryland, reached an interference reduction agreement in 2001, whereby WNNT would surrender its AM license to allow a facility upgrade for WWTL.

In 2006, Lynn Wadsworth sold WNNT-FM to Real Media, Inc.; at the same time, his brother Danny sold WRAR-FM at Tappahannock to Real Media, which was owned by four employees of the Tappahannock FM outlet. Wadsworth quit his duties as morning personality on WNNT-FM as part of the sale. Two years later, WNNT-FM moved from 100.9 to 107.5 MHz as part of a modification proceeding that allowed Richmond-area outlet WDYL (then at 101.1 FM) to move to 100.9 and increase its power. The frequency change also brought a power increase for WNNT-FM, which increased its effective radiated power to 6,000 watts.

== Programming ==
WNNT-FM is the Northern Neck affiliate of the Virginia Tech IMG Sports Network and NASCAR racing from the Motor Racing Network, Performance Racing Network and Indianapolis Motor Speedway Radio Network. On weekdays, the station carries a local swap shop program.
