= WRAR-FM =

Radio station in Tappahannock, Virginia, United States

- Tappahannock, Virginia; United States
- Broadcast area: Northern Neck
- Frequency: 105.5 MHz
- Branding: 105-5 WRAR

Programming
- Format: Hot adult contemporary
- Affiliations: ABC News Radio

Ownership
- Owner: Real Media, Inc.
- Sister stations: WNNT-FM

History
- First air date: 1971
- Call sign meaning: Rappahannock River

Technical information
- Licensing authority: FCC
- Facility ID: 55172
- Class: A
- Power: 6,000 watts
- HAAT: 100 meters (330 ft)
- Transmitter coordinates: 37°52′27″N 76°43′37″W

Links
- Public license information: Public file; LMS
- Webcast: Listen live
- Website: www.realradio804.com

WRAR-FM is a hot adult contemporary formatted broadcast radio station licensed to Tappahannock, Virginia, serving the Northern Neck. WRAR-FM is owned and operated by Real Media, Inc.

== History ==
The station signed on in 1971, as a sister station to WRAR (1000 AM), and has been a contemporary music station since its beginning. The station used live air personalities during the 1970s and 1980s, but relied on syndicated programming during the 1990s. In the 1980s, WRAR was an affiliate of Rick Dees Weekly Top 40. In the last several years, the station has returned to the use of live local announcers once again.

== Notable alumni ==
- Mike Friend: one of the founders of non-commercial WNRN-FM in Charlottesville, Virginia.
- Steve "Mr. Beach" Leonard: after stops at WMXB and WRCL, is now at WJFN-FM.
- Jim Payne: later Operations Manager and Middays at WRVQ in Richmond, Virginia.
