= WRIC-FM =

Radio station in Richlands, Virginia

- Richlands, Virginia; United States
- Broadcast area: Richlands, Virginia; Grundy, Virginia; Lebanon, Virginia
- Frequency: 97.7 MHz
- Branding: Star★FM 959 & 977

Programming
- Format: Hot adult contemporary
- Affiliations: Fox News Radio

Ownership
- Owner: RR & WT Broadcasting, Inc.
- Sister stations: WSTG

History
- First air date: 1991
- Call sign meaning: Richlands

Technical information
- Licensing authority: FCC
- Facility ID: 12044
- Class: C3
- ERP: 3,200 watts
- HAAT: 229 meters (751 ft)
- Transmitter coordinates: 37°9′4.4″N 81°53′55.4″W

Links
- Public license information: Public file; LMS
- Webcast: Listen live
- Website: www.star95.com

WRIC-FM is a hot adult contemporary formatted broadcast radio station licensed to Richlands, Virginia, serving the Richlands/Grundy/Lebanon area. WRIC-FM is owned and operated by RR & WT Broadcasting, Inc.

== History ==
WRIC-FM was originally on 100.7 FM, but switched frequencies with sister station WMJD in Grundy, Virginia, in 2005.

The WRIC calls were originally parked at AM 540 in Richlands, now WGTH.

In April 2009, WRIC-FM began simulcasting WSTG, located in Princeton, West Virginia, which carries a hot adult contemporary format. Around the same time, WRIC-FM's ownership changed from Peggy Sue Broadcasting Corporation to RR & WT Broadcasting, Inc.
