= WIGO-FM =

Radio station in White Stone, Virginia

- White Stone, Virginia; United States
- Broadcast area: Northern Neck; Middle Peninsula
- Frequency: 104.9 MHz
- Branding: 104.9 WIGO Country (pronounced "we-go")

Programming
- Format: Country

Ownership
- Owner: Two Rivers Communications, Inc.
- Sister stations: WKWI

History
- First air date: September 1, 1995
- Former call signs: WVZG (1991–1991); WNDJ (1991–2006); WIGO (2006–2007)

Technical information
- Licensing authority: FCC
- Facility ID: 72904
- Class: A
- ERP: 4,100 watts
- HAAT: 122 meters (400 ft)
- Transmitter coordinates: 37°43′25.00″N 76°23′28.80″W

Links
- Public license information: Public file; LMS
- Webcast: Listen live
- Website: WIGO-FM Online

WIGO-FM is a country music-formatted broadcast radio station licensed to White Stone, Virginia, serving the Northern Neck and the Middle Peninsula of Virginia. It is owned and operated by Two Rivers Communications, Inc.
