= WSTG =

- Princeton, West Virginia; United States
- Broadcast area: Mercer County, West Virginia; Bland County, Virginia
- Frequency: 95.9 MHz
- Branding: Star★FM 959 & 977

Programming
- Format: Hot adult contemporary
- Affiliations: Fox News Radio

Ownership
- Owner: Princeton Broadcasting, Inc.
- Sister stations: WAEY; WRIC-FM

History
- First air date: 1970
- Former call signs: WHGC (1970–1973); WAEY-FM (1973–1999)

Technical information
- Licensing authority: FCC
- Facility ID: 4944
- Class: A
- Power: 480 watts
- HAAT: 348 meters (1,142 ft)
- Transmitter coordinates: 37°15′30.4″N 81°10′36.3″W

Links
- Public license information: Public file; LMS
- Webcast: Listen live
- Website: www.star95.com

WSTG (95.9 FM. "Star FM") is a hot adult contemporary formatted broadcast radio station licensed to Princeton, West Virginia, serving Mercer County, West Virginia, and Bland County, Virginia. WSTG is owned and operated by Princeton Broadcasting, Inc.

Up until 1999 it operated as WAEY-FM and was a country station. It broadcast NASCAR Cup Series, Xfinity Series and Craftsman Truck Series races through the Motor Racing Network until some time after the format change. WHAJ then started carrying NASCAR programming.
