= WAEY =

- Princeton, West Virginia; United States
- Broadcast area: Princeton, West Virginia; Mercer County, West Virginia
- Frequency: 1490 kHz
- Branding: 103-3 The Way

Programming
- Format: Southern gospel
- Affiliations: Salem Radio Network Solid Gospel Network

Ownership
- Owner: Princeton Broadcasting, Inc.
- Sister stations: WSTG

History
- First air date: 1947
- Call sign meaning: pronounced as "Way"

Technical information
- Licensing authority: FCC
- Facility ID: 4945
- Class: C
- Power: 1,000 watts
- Transmitter coordinates: 37°23′23.4″N 81°5′57.3″W

Links
- Public license information: Public file; LMS
- Webcast: Listen live

WAEY is a southern gospel formatted broadcast radio station licensed to Princeton, West Virginia, serving Princeton and Mercer County, West Virginia. WAEY is owned and operated by Princeton Broadcasting, Inc.

== Translator ==
In addition to the main station, WAEY is relayed by an FM translator to widen its broadcast area.

Call sign	Frequency	City of license	FID	ERP (W)	HAAT	Class	FCC info
W277AW	103.3 FM	Princeton, West Virginia	145794	65	98.1 m (322 ft)	D	LMS
