= WODI =

Brookneal, Virginia; United States
- Broadcast area: Brookneal, Virginia; Altavista, Virginia
- Frequency: 1230 kHz
- Branding: 1230 The Fan

Programming
- Format: Defunct (was Sports Talk)
- Affiliations: CBS Sports Radio

Ownership
- Owner: JKC Media Ventures LLC

History
- First air date: 1965
- Former call signs: WLLI (1964–1965)
- Call sign meaning: W ODI as in "woodie"

Technical information
- Facility ID: 60771
- Class: C
- Power: 1,000 watts day and night
- Transmitter coordinates: 37°2′17.0″N 78°56′30.0″W

WODI (1230 AM) was a sports talk formatted broadcast radio station licensed to Brookneal, Virginia, serving Brookneal and Altavista in Virginia. WODI was last owned and operated by JKC Media Ventures LLC.

In September 2013, it was reported that the owners of WODI had asked the Federal Communications Commission for permission to cease broadcasting temporarily because of technical problems which had caused the transmitter to shut down repeatedly.

== History ==
The station was launched in 1965 and served central Virginia.

In March 2009, The Rain Broadcasting, Inc., purchased WODI from D and M Communications.

The Rain Broadcasting, Inc. is owned by Roger W. and Kangja Morgan. Roger is a broadcast radio programming veteran having programmed radio stations throughout the U.S. including KOIL in Omaha, WIFE in Indianapolis, and KISN in Portland for Star Stations. More recently, Roger programmed KYA and K-101 in San Francisco and served as host and producer of "Rock N' Roll Rewind."

Ownership of WODI was subsequently transferred to JKC Media Ventures LLC of Edison, New Jersey.

The Federal Communications Commission cancelled WODI's license on August 31, 2021, due to the station having been silent since at least December 21, 2019.

== Featured ==
WODI's studio, tower, and staff were featured in a July 17, 2003 edition of Scott Fybush's "Tower Site of the Week" website.

== Station sold ==
According to radio information website VARTV.com, D&M Communications sold WODI to Christianstead, St. Croix, US Virgin Islands-based The Rain Broadcasting for $135,000. The Rain Broadcasting owns one other station, WVVI-FM in Christianstead, St. Croix.
