= WPEX =

Kenbridge, Virginia; United States
- Broadcast area: Eastern Lunenburg County, Virginia; Northwestern Brunswick County, Virginia
- Frequency: 90.9 MHz
- Branding: 90.9 WPEX

Programming
- Format: Defunct (was Adult hits)

Ownership
- Owner: Seaview Communications Inc.

History
- First air date: 1994

Technical information
- Licensing authority: FCC
- Facility ID: 59528
- Class: A
- Power: 1,000 Watts
- HAAT: 62 Meters
- Transmitter coordinates: 36°54′52.0″N 78°5′11.0″W

Links
- Public license information: Public file; LMS
- Website: WPEX Online

WPEX was an adult hits-formatted broadcast radio station licensed to Kenbridge, Virginia, serving Eastern Lunenburg County, Virginia and Northwestern Brunswick County, Virginia. WPEX was last owned and operated by Seaview Communications Inc.

WPEX's license was deleted on December 10, 2021, due to the station having been silent for more than twelve months.
