= WKWI =

- Kilmarnock, Virginia; United States
- Broadcast area: Northern Neck; Middle Peninsula
- Frequency: 101.7 MHz
- Branding: 101.7 Bay FM

Programming
- Format: Classic hits
- Affiliations: 24/7 News

Ownership
- Owner: Two Rivers Communications, Inc.
- Sister stations: WIGO-FM

History
- First air date: September 1, 1975
- Call sign meaning: "Kilmarnock, White Stone, Irvington"

Technical information
- Licensing authority: FCC
- Facility ID: 7773
- Class: A
- ERP: 2,200 watts
- HAAT: 122 meters (400 ft)
- Transmitter coordinates: 37°43′25.0″N 76°23′28.80″W

Links
- Public license information: Public file; LMS
- Webcast: Listen live
- Website: www.middlenecknews.com/1017bayfm/

WKWI (101.7 FM, "101.7 Bay FM") is a classic hits-formatted broadcast radio station licensed to Kilmarnock, Virginia, serving the Northern Neck and Middle Peninsula of Virginia. WKWI is owned and operated by Two Rivers Communications, Inc.
