= WLTK =

- New Market, Virginia; United States
- Broadcast area: Harrisonburg, Virginia; Staunton, Virginia
- Frequency: 102.9 MHz
- Branding: K-Love

Programming
- Format: Contemporary Christian
- Network: K-Love

Ownership
- Owner: Educational Media Foundation
- Sister stations: WBTX; WNLR

History
- First air date: 1997
- Former call signs: WEZI (1993–1997); WBHB-FM (1997–2001)
- Former frequencies: 103.3 MHz (1997–2012)

Technical information
- Licensing authority: FCC
- Facility ID: 12600
- Class: A
- Power: 2,050 watts
- HAAT: 169 meters (554 ft)
- Transmitter coordinates: 38°36′30.4″N 78°54′8″W

Links
- Public license information: Public file; LMS
- Webcast: Listen live
- Website: www.klove.com

WLTK (102.9 FM) is a contemporary Christian formatted broadcast radio station licensed to New Market, Virginia, serving the Harrisonburg/Staunton area. WLTK is owned and operated by Educational Media Foundation.

== History ==
Originally starting on the 103.3 FM frequency, the station first took the call sign WEZI on September 15, 1993, and officially launched in 1997 with a light adult contemporary format, branded as "EZ 103".

On November 7, 1997, WEZI switched its call sign to WBHB-FM and changed the format to oldies, branded as "Bob 103.3", and later went by "B-103.3"

On August 8, 2001, WBHB-FM swapped call signs and formats with WLTK (96.1 FM), becoming a Contemporary Christian format, branded as "Light 103.3" before changing to "X103 The Cross" in 2004. WBHB-FM remained on 96.1 FM until February 7, 2005, when the WBHB-FM callsign and oldies format moved to 105.1 FM as part of a frequency swap that also moved WJDV from 105.1 FM to 96.1 FM.

On February 1, 2010, WLTK dropped its "X103 The Cross" format and began broadcasting the K-Love music service, though it continued to be locally owned.

On June 15, 2012, the owners of WLTK applied for and were granted a new broadcast license moving it from 103.3 to 102.9, but from the same location and tower, at the same power and over the same coverage area as previously. This move allowed a new broadcast station to launch on 103.3 from Wardensville, West Virginia. On June 19, 2012, WLTK officially switched frequencies from 103.3 to 102.9.

On May 1, 2017, Massanutten Broadcasting Company, Inc. sold WLTK to K-Love's parent entity, Educational Media Foundation, for $600,000.
