= WNLR =

- Churchville, Virginia; United States
- Broadcast area: Staunton, Virginia; Augusta County, Virginia
- Frequency: 1150 kHz
- Branding: New Life Radio WNLR

Programming
- Format: Christian talk and teaching

Ownership
- Owner: New Life Ministries, Inc.
- Sister stations: WBTX, WLTK

History
- First air date: March 3, 1962
- Former call signs: WABH (1962–1981)
- Call sign meaning: "New Life Radio"

Technical information
- Licensing authority: FCC
- Facility ID: 48541
- Class: D
- Power: 2,500 Watts daytime; 35 Watts nighttime
- Transmitter coordinates: 38°12′39.0″N 79°7′53.0″W

Links
- Public license information: Public file; LMS
- Webcast: WNLR Webstream
- Website: wnlr1150.com

WNLR (1150 AM) is a radio station licensed to Churchville, Virginia, United States, broadcasting a Christian talk and teaching format to Staunton and Augusta County. WNLR is owned and operated by New Life Ministries, Inc.

== History ==
On September 26, 1959, a partnership of four men known as the Deerfield Broadcasting Company applied with the Federal Communications Commission (FCC) for permission to build a new radio station at Deerfield, Virginia, to broadcast with 1,000 watts during daytime hours only. A construction permit was approved on September 13, 1961, and after an investment estimated at $20,000, WABH began broadcasting on March 3, 1962. To accommodate the new station, telephone service in the town had to be upgraded with new wiring. One of the four founding owners, Ralph O. Hamilton, gradually bought out the other partners in WABH by 1969; Vincent D. O'Connell and Robert Lee Dean acquired WABH in 1973. The station moved to Churchville in 1976.

In 1981, Blue Ridge Broadcasting acquired WABH from O'Connell and Dean. On June 1, the station became WNLR "New Life Radio", the first Christian radio station in the area, operated on a commercial basis. Blue Ridge was locally owned by Alan Carter of Staunton and Jack Ferguson of Waynesboro; Carter purchased Jack Ferguson's interests in 1981 prior to Ferguson dying in 1982. In 1984, Carter constructed a new station facility and relocated to the tower site. Carter subsidized the station's operations for more than a decade from personal funds, eventually using the profits from a voice messaging franchise system he co-owned. The station's Christian format did not attract sufficient revenue to pay for station operations, so Carter created New Life Ministries, a 501(c)(3) non-profit corporation in 1987. New Life Ministries accepted donations and used to same to purchase commercial free time on the station. By the late 80's, the combined commercial advertising sales and New Life Ministries purchase of commercial free time were sufficient to cover the stations operating expenses. In 1992, having owned the station for a decade and personally subsidized WNLR with over $1,000,000 from his personal funds, Carter determined New Life Ministries was sufficiently strong to purchase the station and opened discussion with the New Life Ministries board. Although he originally purchased the station for $275,000 he sold it to New Life Ministries for $200,000 financed interest free. New Life Ministries began using a portion of its Sharathon funds to apply to the purchase. The acquisition was completed on January 1, 1994.

In 2010, as a fundraiser, New Life Ministries built a house near Waynesboro in order to sell it and raise an estimated $20,000 to $30,000 for station operations; the ministry received loans to finance the purchase of land and construction costs, while a local construction company pledged at-cost services.
