= WJMA =

Radio station in Culpeper, Virginia

- Culpeper, Virginia; United States
- Broadcast area: Central Virginia
- Frequency: 103.1 MHz
- Branding: 103.1 WJMA

Programming
- Format: Country

Ownership
- Owner: Piedmont Communications, Inc.
- Sister stations: WCVA; WOJL; WVCV

History
- First air date: December 4, 1971
- Former call signs: WCUL (1971–2004); WJMA-FM (2004–2011)

Technical information
- Licensing authority: FCC
- Facility ID: 14710
- Class: A
- ERP: 6,000 watts
- HAAT: 86 meters (282 ft)
- Transmitter coordinates: 38°29′4.5″N 77°59′21″W
- Repeater: 1340 WVCV (Orange)

Links
- Public license information: Public file; LMS
- Website: wjmafm.com

WJMA is a country formatted broadcast radio station licensed to Culpeper, Virginia, serving Central Virginia. WJMA is owned and operated by Piedmont Communications, Inc.
