= WVCV =

Simulcasting WJMA, Culpeper
- Orange, Virginia; United States
- Broadcast area: Orange, Virginia; Orange County, Virginia
- Frequency: 1340 kHz

Programming
- Format: Country

Ownership
- Owner: Piedmont Communications, Inc.
- Sister stations: WCVA; WJMA; WOJL; WKTR

History
- First air date: September 10, 1949
- Former call signs: WJMA (1949–1998)
- Call sign meaning: Voice of Central Virginia (formerly aired talk programming)

Technical information
- Licensing authority: FCC
- Facility ID: 54873
- Class: C
- Power: 1,000 watts unlimited
- Transmitter coordinates: 38°15′14.5″N 78°7′14″W

Links
- Public license information: Public file; LMS
- Website: https://www.wjmafm.com

WVCV (1340 AM) is a broadcast radio station licensed to Orange, Virginia, serving Orange and Orange County, Virginia. WVCV is owned and operated by Piedmont Communications, Inc. and simulcasts the country music format of co-owned WJMA-FM in Culpeper. Prior to February 2016, it had aired a satellite-fed Adult Standards format.
