= WBTX =

- Broadway-Timberville, Virginia; United States
- Broadcast area: Northern Rockingham County, Virginia; Southern Shenandoah County, Virginia
- Frequency: 1470 kHz
- Branding: 102.1 FM 1470 AM WBTX

Programming
- Format: Southern Gospel

Ownership
- Owner: WBTX Radio, LLC
- Sister stations: WLTK, WNLR

History
- First air date: May 18, 1972

Technical information
- Licensing authority: FCC
- Facility ID: 40649
- Class: D
- Power: 5,000 watts (day); 36 watts (night)
- Transmitter coordinates: 38°37′24.0″N 78°48′52.0″W

Links
- Public license information: Public file; LMS
- Webcast: Listen live
- Website: www.wbtxradio.com

WBTX is a Southern Gospel formatted broadcast radio station licensed to Broadway-Timberville, Virginia, serving Northern Rockingham County and Southern Shenandoah County in Virginia. WBTX is owned and operated by WBTX Radio, LLC.

== Translator ==
In addition to the main station, WBTX is relayed by an FM translator to widen its broadcast area.

Call sign	Frequency	City of license	FID	ERP (W)	HAAT	Class	FCC info
W271CC	(102.1 FM) FM	Broadway, Virginia	150808	76 watts	179 m (587 ft)	D	LMS
