= WMVA (AM) =

- Martinsville, Virginia; United States
- Broadcast area: Martinsville, Virginia; Henry County, Virginia
- Frequency: 1450 kHz

Programming
- Format: Oldies

Ownership
- Owner: Martinsville Media, Inc.
- Sister stations: WHEE; WYAT-LD

History
- First air date: 1941
- Last air date: January 28, 2019
- Call sign meaning: Martinsville, Virginia

Technical information
- Facility ID: 40510
- Class: C
- Power: 1,000 watts day and night
- Transmitter coordinates: 36°42′0.5″N 79°51′6.1″W

WMVA was an oldies formatted broadcast radio station licensed to Martinsville, Virginia, serving Martinsville and Henry County, Virginia. WMVA was last owned and operated by Martinsville Media, Inc.

== History ==
In October 2005, William D. Wyatt, Jr. purchased WMVA, which had an adult contemporary and sports radio format, from Billy D. Wilson and Linda R. Wilson. whom purchased it from founder Hans Peter Bluhm.

The station went silent on January 28, 2019, and it never returned to the air. Its license was surrendered on July 23, 2021, and was cancelled on July 27, 2021.

== Past personalities ==
- Charles F. Adams, newscaster (1942–1947, 1948, 1955)
- Pete Bluhm
- Barry Michaels, radio personality, seven p.m. until midnight
