= WREL =

- Lexington, Virginia; United States
- Broadcast area: Lexington, Virginia; Buena Vista, Virginia
- Frequency: 1450 kHz
- Branding: Big Dawg 100.3

Programming
- Format: Classic country

Ownership
- Owner: First Media Radio, LLC
- Sister stations: WWZW

History
- First air date: 1948
- Call sign meaning: Robert E. Lee (Confederate general and later Lexington resident)

Technical information
- Licensing authority: FCC
- Facility ID: 19671
- Class: C
- Power: 1,000 watts day and night
- Transmitter coordinates: 37°46′0.0″N 79°25′56.0″W
- Translator: 100.3 W262DG (Lexington)

Links
- Public license information: Public file; LMS
- Webcast: WREL Webstream
- Website: WREL Online

WREL (1450 AM) is a classic country formatted broadcast radio station licensed to Lexington, Virginia, serving Lexington/Buena Vista area. WREL is owned and operated by First Media Radio, LLC.
