= WXMY =

Radio station in Saltville, Virginia (1981–2018)

- Saltville, Virginia; United States
- Broadcast area: Saltville, Virginia; Marion, Virginia
- Frequency: 1600 kHz

Programming
- Format: Defunct

Ownership
- Owner: Continental Media Group, LLC

History
- First air date: 1981
- Last air date: June 27, 2018
- Former call signs: WIAJ (1980–1981); WKGK (1981–1990)

Technical information
- Facility ID: 74348
- Class: D
- Power: 23,000 watts daytime; 11 watts nighttime
- Transmitter coordinates: 36°51′20.0″N 81°43′34.0″W

WXMY was a broadcast radio station licensed to Saltville, Virginia, serving Saltville and Marion. WXMY was owned and operated by Continental Media Group, LLC.

== Owner arrested ==
Authorities in Smyth County, Virginia, arrested WXMY owner Jeff Raynor on Wednesday, July 18, 2007. Raynor was charged with one count of using electronic communication to solicit sexual activity with a child and one count of possession of child pornography.

On July 19, 2007, WXMY fell silent and the WXMY website was taken offline.

On Wednesday, July 25, 2007, WXMY came back on the air and was being run by Wendy Raynor. The station was then being listed as owned by Continental Media Group, LLC in the FCC database; previously it showed Jeffrey L. Raynor as owner.

According to the station's website (as of September 2, 2007), WXMY had fallen silent. Then in October 2007, WXMY returned to the airwaves with a Classic Country format.

== FCC license issues ==
In February 2007, the station received permission for pre-sunrise and post-sunset operations, which allows a daytime-only AM station to operate at reduced power during the period shortly before sunrise and shortly after sunset when the FCC determines the station does not need to cease operations to protect other AM stations.

On April 30, 2007, Continental Media Group applied with the FCC to increase power from 5 kW to 23 kW (daytime) and 11 watts at night. That application was still pending as of December 30, 2007.

On June 27, 2018, Continental Media Group surrendered WXMY's license to the FCC. The FCC cancelled the station's license on July 2, 2018.
