= WBBC-FM =

- Blackstone, Virginia; United States
- Broadcast area: Southside Virginia
- Frequency: 93.5 MHz
- Branding: Bobcat Country 93.5 FM

Programming
- Format: Country

Ownership
- Owner: Denbar Communications, Inc.
- Sister stations: WKLV

History
- First air date: November 17, 1975
- Former call signs: WBBC (1975–1987); WBBC-FM (1987–Present)
- Call sign meaning: "Bobcat"

Technical information
- Licensing authority: FCC
- Facility ID: 16583
- Class: C3
- ERP: 17,500 Watts
- HAAT: 120 meters (390 ft)
- Transmitter coordinates: 37°3′14.0″N 78°1′15.0″W

Links
- Public license information: Public file; LMS
- Webcast: WBBC-FM Webstream
- Website: WBBC Online

WBBC-FM is a Country formatted broadcast radio station licensed to Blackstone, Virginia, serving Southside Virginia. WBBC-FM is owned and operated by Denbar Communications, Inc.
