= WDUF =

Radio station in Duffield, Virginia (1986–2007)

- Duffield, Virginia; United States
- Broadcast area: Duffield, Virginia; Pennington Gap, Virginia; Big Stone Gap, Virginia
- Frequency: 1120 kHz

Ownership
- Owner: Duffield Broadcasting Company

History
- First air date: August 12, 1986
- Last air date: September 6, 2007
- Call sign meaning: Duffield

Technical information
- Facility ID: 17674
- Class: D
- Power: 1,000 watts (days only)
- Transmitter coordinates: 36°42′30.0″N 82°47′30.0″W

WDUF was a country, bluegrass, and Southern gospel-formatted broadcast radio station licensed to Duffield, Virginia, and served the Duffield/Pennington Gap/Big Stone Gap area. WDUF was owned and operated by the Duffield Broadcasting Company.
