= WOJL =

- Louisa, Virginia; United States
- Broadcast area: Louisa County, Virginia; Orange County, Virginia
- Frequency: 105.5 MHz (HD Radio)
- Branding: Classic Hits 105.5 & 95.3, Sam FM

Programming
- Format: Classic hits
- Affiliations: Classic Hits (Westwood One)

Ownership
- Owner: Piedmont Communications, Inc.
- Sister stations: WCVA, WJMA, WVCV, WKTR

History
- First air date: July 8, 1980 (as WLSA)
- Former call signs: WLSA (1980–2004)
- Call sign meaning: related to former Oldies format

Technical information
- Licensing authority: FCC
- Facility ID: 41899
- Class: A
- ERP: 6,000 watts
- HAAT: 99 meters
- Transmitter coordinates: 38°1′37.0″N 78°1′5.0″W
- Repeaters: 840 WKTR (Earlysville); 1490 WCVA (Culpeper)

Links
- Public license information: Public file; LMS
- Webcast: Listen Live
- Website: WOJL Online

WOJL (105.5 FM) is a classic hits formatted broadcast radio station licensed to Louisa, Virginia, serving Orange and Louisa counties. WOJL is owned and operated by Piedmont Communications, Inc.

To cover the other principal cities in its broadcast area, WOJL's programming is simulcast on WCVA (1490 AM) and W237CA (95.3 FM) in Culpeper, and WKTR (840 AM) and W288ED (105.5 FM) in Charlottesville.

== History ==
WOJL signed on the air on July 8, 1980 with the callsign WLSA, carrying a Country format.

At midnight on May 27, 2004, WLSA dropped "105 Country" after being bought by Piedmont Communications and switched to oldies as "Oldies 105". A month later on June 28, the callsign was switched to WOJL, which is now broadcast in HD.

At noon on July 2, 2005, the format was switched again, this time to Adult Hits under the branding "Sam FM". On August 31, 2015, Westwood One eliminated the Sam FM service. The same day, WOJL dropped the Adult Hits format, switching to Classic Hits as "Classic Hits 105.5". The station reverted to the "Sam FM" branding in early January 2016. Also in early 2016, the station began simulcasting on 95.3 W237CA, an FM translator in Culpeper, via sister station 1490 WCVA.
