= WKLV (AM) =

- Blackstone, Virginia; United States
- Broadcast area: Blackstone, Virginia; Victoria, Virginia; Alberta, Virginia
- Frequency: 1440 kHz
- Branding: K92.7

Programming
- Format: Oldies, classic hits
- Affiliations: Good Time Oldies (Westwood One)

Ownership
- Owner: Denbar Communications, Inc.
- Sister stations: WBBC-FM

History
- First air date: 1947
- Former call signs: WKLV (1947–1987); WBBC (1987–1993)

Technical information
- Licensing authority: FCC
- Facility ID: 16584
- Class: D
- Power: 5,000 watts (day); 72 watts (night)
- Transmitter coordinates: 37°3′14.0″N 78°1′15.0″W
- Translator: 92.7 W224DB (Blackstone)

Links
- Public license information: Public file; LMS
- Website: k927-fm.com

WKLV is an oldies and classic hits formatted broadcast radio station licensed to Blackstone, Virginia, serving Blackstone, Victoria, and Alberta in Virginia. WKLV is owned and operated by Denbar Communications, Inc.

== Translator ==
In addition to the main station, WKLV is relayed by an FM translator to widen its broadcast area.

Broadcast translator for WKLV
Call sign	Frequency	City of license	FID	ERP (W)	HAAT	Class	FCC info
W224DB	92.7 FM	Blackstone, Virginia	139541	230	214 m (702 ft)	D	LMS
