= WXGM-FM =

Radio station in Gloucester, Virginia

- Gloucester, Virginia; United States
- Broadcast area: Middle Peninsula; Northern Neck; Greater Williamsburg, Virginia
- Frequency: 99.1 MHz
- Branding: "Xtra 99.1"

Programming
- Format: Adult contemporary
- Affiliations: AccuWeather; NBC News Radio; Virginia News Network; Adult Contemporary (Westwood One)

Ownership
- Owner: WXGM, Inc.
- Sister stations: WXGM

History
- First air date: 1991

Technical information
- Licensing authority: FCC
- Facility ID: 74209
- Class: A
- ERP: 6,000 Watts
- HAAT: 100 Meters
- Transmitter coordinates: 37°24′36.0″N 76°32′52.0″W

Links
- Public license information: Public file; LMS
- Webcast: WXGM-FM Webstream
- Website: WXGM-FM Online

WXGM-FM is an Adult Contemporary formatted broadcast radio station licensed to Gloucester, Virginia, serving the Middle Peninsula and the Northern Neck in Virginia, along with Greater Williamsburg. WXGM-FM is owned and operated by WXGM, Inc.
