= WAXM =

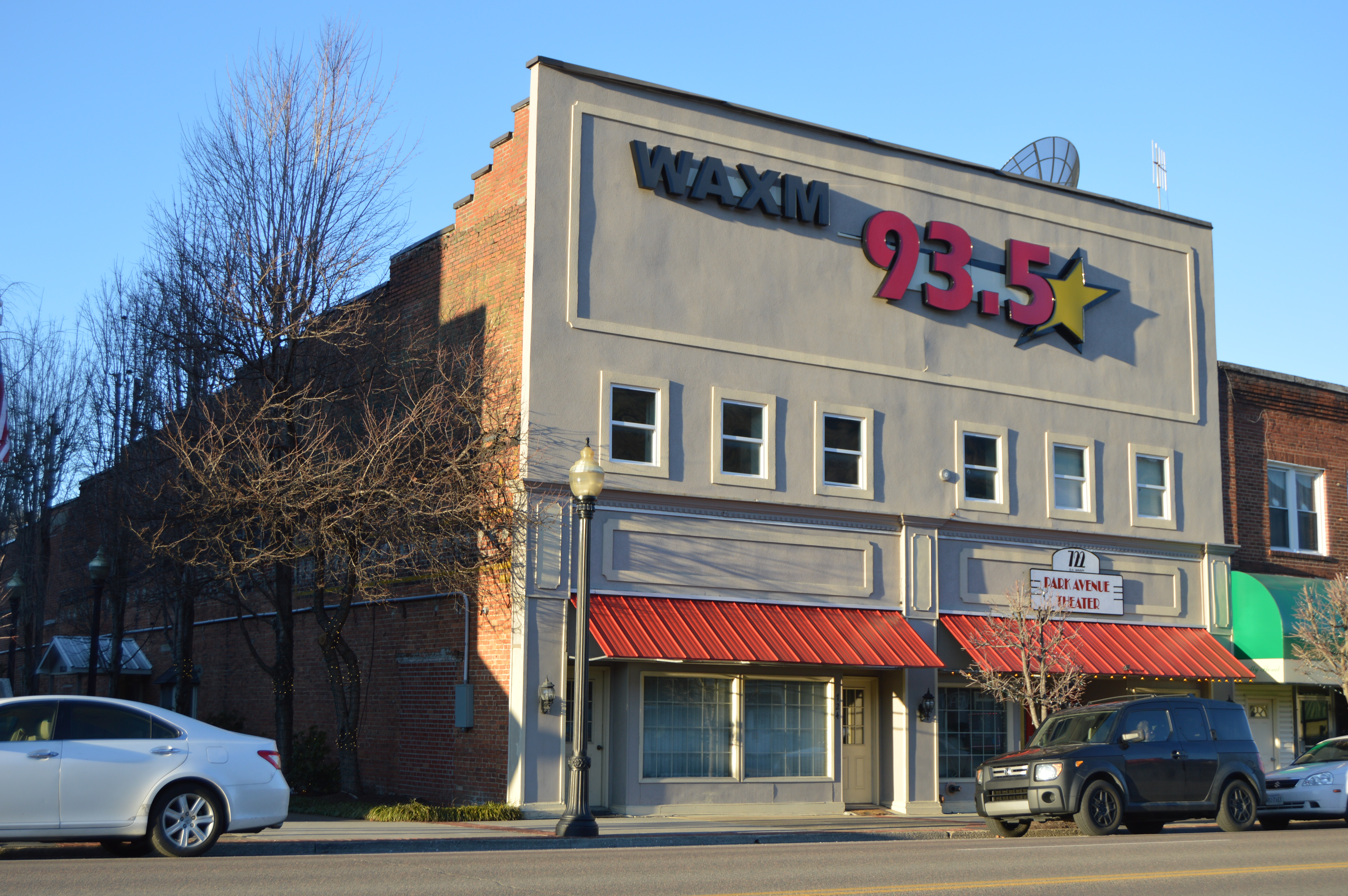
- WAXM studios in Norton, Virginia
- Big Stone Gap, Virginia; United States
- Broadcast area: Southwest Virginia; Eastern Kentucky
- Frequency: 93.5 MHz
- Branding: 93-5 WAXM

Programming
- Format: Country
- Affiliations: SRN News; Compass Media Networks

Ownership
- Owner: Valley Broadcasting and Communications, Inc.
- Sister stations: WLSD

History
- First air date: April 8, 1975
- Former call signs: WLSD-FM (1975–1988)

Technical information
- Licensing authority: FCC
- Facility ID: 69689
- Class: C2
- ERP: 2,450 watts
- HAAT: 574 meters (1,883 ft)
- Transmitter coordinates: 36°54′50.0″N 82°53′40.0″W

Links
- Public license information: Public file; LMS
- Webcast: Listen live
- Website: waxm.com

WAXM is a Country-formatted broadcast radio station licensed to Big Stone Gap, Virginia, serving Southwest Virginia and Eastern Kentucky. WAXM is owned and operated by Valley Broadcasting and Communications, Inc.
