= WWZW =

Radio station in Buena Vista, Virginia

- Buena Vista, Virginia; United States
- Broadcast area: Lexington, Virginia; Lynchburg metropolitan area
- Frequency: 96.7 MHz
- Branding: Classic 96.7 3WZ

Programming
- Format: Classic hits

Ownership
- Owner: First Media Radio, LLC
- Sister stations: WREL

History
- First air date: 1981; 45 years ago
- Former call signs: WWZD (1980–1985); WVLI (1985–1990); WREL-FM (1990–2004); WWZW-FM (2004)
- Call sign meaning: a nod to former sister WZWW in Bellefonte, Pennsylvania

Technical information
- Licensing authority: FCC
- Facility ID: 19672
- Class: B1
- ERP: 2,650 watts
- HAAT: 306 meters (1,004 ft)
- Transmitter coordinates: 37°43′38.0″N 79°18′23.0″W

Links
- Public license information: Public file; LMS
- Webcast: WWZW Webstream
- Website: WWZW Online

WWZW (96.7 MHz) is a commercial FM radio station licensed to Buena Vista, Virginia, and serving the Lexington area and part of the Lynchburg metropolitan area. WWZW is owned and operated by First Media Radio, LLC. It broadcasts a classic hits radio format. The studios and offices are on Main Street in Lexington.

WWZW has an effective radiated power (ERP) of 2,000 watts. The transmitter is on Blue Ridge Parkway near U.S. Route 60 in Buena Vista.

== History ==
The station signed on the air in 1981. Its original call sign was WWZD. It was the sister station to WREL (1450 AM) in Lexington. In 1985, Equus Communications acquired WWZD and WREL for $185,000. WWZD changed its call sign to WVLI on November 1, 1985, and to WREL-FM on May 1, 1990. The two stations simulcast a full service country music format.

On July 22, 2004, WREL-AM-FM were sold to First Media Radio. On September 9, 2004, WREL-FM switched its call letters to WWZW-FM (Note: The "-FM" suffix was dropped on October 15, 2004.) to match co-owned station WZWW in Bellefonte, Pennsylvania. On November 1, 2004, WWZW, still a country music station, adopted the "3WZ" branding, the same branding used by WZWW, an adult contemporary station. On February 2, 2005, First Media Radio changed WWZW's format from country to adult contemporary; sister WREL remained a talk station.

In July 2009, WWZW switched from adult contemporary to classic hits as "Classic 96.7 3WZ".
