= WLSD =

- Big Stone Gap, Virginia; United States
- Broadcast area: Norton, Virginia; Wise County, Virginia
- Frequency: 1220 kHz
- Branding: 92.5 The Vault

Programming
- Format: Classic hits
- Affiliations: SRN News

Ownership
- Owner: Valley Broadcasting and Communications, Inc.
- Sister stations: WAXM

History
- First air date: August 20, 1953
- Call sign meaning: Wise Lee Scott Dickenson

Technical information
- Licensing authority: FCC
- Facility ID: 69676
- Class: D
- Power: 1,000 watts (day); 45 watts (night)
- Transmitter coordinates: 36°50′26.0″N 82°44′14.0″W
- Translator: 92.5 W223AA (Big Stone Gap)

Links
- Public license information: Public file; LMS
- Webcast: Listen live
- Website: wlsdradio.com

WLSD (1220 AM) is a classic hits formatted broadcast radio station. The station is licensed to Big Stone Gap, Virginia and serves the City of Norton and Wise County in Virginia. WLSD is owned and operated by Valley Broadcasting and Communications, Inc.

== History ==
WLSD first went on air August 20, 1953. According to then-station manager William H. Wren, the call letters stood for the four counties served by WLSD: Wise-Lee-Scott-Dickenson. On January 4, 2021, the format of the station was changed from Southern Gospel and Religious to Classic Hits branding as "92-5 The Vault".

== Translator ==
In addition to WLSD's primary frequency, the station's programming is simulcast on the following translator station, on the FM band, to widen WLSD's broadcast area.

Broadcast translator for WLSD
Call sign	Frequency	City of license	FID	ERP (W)	HAAT	Class	Transmitter coordinates	FCC info
W223AA	92.5 FM	Big Stone Gap, Virginia	69690	250	570 m (1,870 ft)	D	36°54′50.30″N 82°53′39.50″W	LMS
