= WMJD =

- Grundy, Virginia; United States
- Broadcast area: Grundy, Virginia; Buchanan County, Virginia
- Frequency: 100.7 MHz
- Branding: Classic Country 100.7 WMJD

Programming
- Format: Classic Country
- Affiliations: ABC Radio News; MRN Radio; PRN Radio

Ownership
- Owner: Peggy Sue Broadcasting Corporation
- Sister stations: WNRG

History
- First air date: 1965

Technical information
- Licensing authority: FCC
- Facility ID: 70346
- Class: A
- Power: 2,300 Watts
- HAAT: 163 Meters
- Transmitter coordinates: 37°18′8.0″N 82°7′4.0″W

Links
- Public license information: Public file; LMS
- Webcast: WMJD Webstream
- Website: WMJD Online

WMJD is a Classic Country formatted broadcast radio station licensed to Grundy, Virginia, serving Grundy and Buchanan County, Virginia. WMJD is owned and operated by Peggy Sue Broadcasting Corporation.

== Programming ==
WMJD carries ABC Radio News at the top of every hour. WMJD carried Paul Harvey's "News & Comment" program in the morning and midday, along with "The Rest of the Story" in the afternoons until Harvey's death.

The Coffee Pot Show is weekdays from 6:00am to 10:00am est with host, Rodney Davis. From 10:00am to 10:30am est, WMJD offers a live interactive locally sponsored trading post. Listeners have the ability to call and place free classified ads on air.

== Frequency change ==
On July 27, 2005, WMJD and sister WRIC swapped frequencies, with WRIC moving to 97.7, a frequency that WMJD had been at since the station went on the air.
