= WPIB =

Coordinates: 37.257°N 81.178°W

- Bluefield, West Virginia; United States
- Broadcast area: New River Valley
- Frequency: 91.1 MHz
- Branding: Spirit FM

Programming
- Format: Christian adult contemporary

Ownership
- Owner: Positive Alternative Radio, Inc.
- Sister stations: WAMN

History
- First air date: 1995

Technical information
- Licensing authority: FCC
- Class: C1
- ERP: 12,000 watts
- HAAT: 361 meters (1,184 ft)
- Translator: 106.9 W295AI (Marion)

Links
- Public license information: Public file; LMS
- Webcast: Listen live
- Website: www.spiritfm.com

WPIB is a Christian adult contemporary formatted broadcast radio station licensed to Bluefield, West Virginia, serving the New River Valley. WPIB is owned and operated by Positive Alternative Radio, Inc.
