= WKEX =

Former simulcast of WPIN Dublin
- Blacksburg, Virginia; United States
- Broadcast area: Blacksburg, Virginia; Montgomery County, Virginia
- Frequency: 1430 kHz
- Branding: ESPN Radio Blacksburg

Programming
- Format: Sports radio
- Affiliations: ESPN Radio; Carolina Panthers; Pulaski River Turtles

Ownership
- Owner: Baker Family Stations; (Base Communications, Inc.)
- Sister stations: WPIN

History
- First air date: July 10, 1969
- Last air date: August 17, 2025

Technical information
- Licensing authority: FCC
- Facility ID: 57131
- Class: D
- Power: 1,000 watts (day); 62 watts (night)
- Transmitter coordinates: 37°13′57″N 80°26′40″W

Links
- Public license information: Public file; LMS
- Webcast: Listen live
- Website: espnblacksburg.com

WKEX (1430 AM) was a sports formatted broadcast radio station licensed to Blacksburg, Virginia, serving Blacksburg and Montgomery County, Virginia. WKEX was owned and operated by Baker Family Stations.

On August 17, 2025, WKEX was taken silent due to financial reasons. On August 17, 2026, the final day the station's license would have been forfeited after one year of silence pursuant to the Telecommunications Act of 1996, Baker filed to cancel it. The license was cancelled on August 18. WKEX had a paired FM translator, W290CU on 105.9 licensed to Christiansburg, which was reassigned to WPAR.
