= WYVE =

- Wytheville, Virginia; United States
- Broadcast area: Wytheville, Virginia; Wythe County, Virginia
- Frequency: 1280 kHz
- Branding: Your Hometown Sound, 99.9 WYVE

Programming
- Format: Full service country
- Affiliations: AP Radio News

Ownership
- Owner: Blue Ridge Media Partners
- Sister stations: WLOY, WXBX

History
- First air date: 1949
- Call sign meaning: WYtheVillE

Technical information
- Licensing authority: FCC
- Facility ID: 59686
- Class: D
- Power: 2,500 watts day 164 watts night
- Transmitter coordinates: 36°57′54.0″N 81°4′50.0″W
- Translator: 99.9 W260DI (Wytheville)

Links
- Public license information: Public file; LMS
- Website: WYVE Online

WYVE (1280 AM) is a full service-formatted broadcast radio station licensed to Wytheville, Virginia, serving Wytheville and Wythe County, Virginia. WYVE is Wytheville's original radio station, having signed on in 1949.

The station has a country music format, and is known as "Your Hometown Sound" and describes its sound on-air as "The Best of Country Music, Old and New". The station maintains a strong community focus and promotes mainly its FM frequency of 99.9, but also mentions the heritage 1280 AM sometimes.
