= WGTH-FM =

WGTH
- Richlands, Virginia; United States
- Broadcast area: Richlands, Virginia; Tazewell, Virginia
- Frequency: 105.5 MHz
- Branding: The Sheep

Programming
- Format: Southern gospel; Religious

Ownership
- Owner: High Knob Broadcasters, Inc.
- Sister stations: WGTH

History
- First air date: January 3, 1977
- Former call signs: WGTH (1977–1995)
- Call sign meaning: "Gates to Heaven"

Technical information
- Licensing authority: FCC
- Facility ID: 27167
- Class: A
- ERP: 450 watts
- HAAT: 244 meters (801 ft)
- Transmitter coordinates: 37°9′20.4″N 81°46′10.4″W

Links
- Public license information: Public file; LMS
- Webcast: Listen live
- Website: www.wgth.net

WGTH-FM is a southern gospel and religious-formatted broadcast radio station licensed to Richlands, Virginia, serving the Richlands/Tazewell area. WGTH-FM is owned and operated by High Knob Broadcasters, Inc.
