= WLQM-FM =

- Franklin, Virginia; United States
- Broadcast area: Western Tidewater
- Frequency: 101.7 MHz
- Branding: Real Country 101.7

Programming
- Format: Full-service
- Affiliations: ABC Radio's Real Country; MRN Radio; NBC News Radio; PRN Radio

Ownership
- Owner: Franklin Broadcasting Corporation
- Sister stations: WJZU

History
- First air date: 1956

Technical information
- Licensing authority: FCC
- Facility ID: 22316
- Class: A
- ERP: 3,000 Watts
- HAAT: 143 Meters
- Transmitter coordinates: 36°41′17.0″N 77°0′58.0″W

Links
- Public license information: Public file; LMS
- Webcast: WLQM-FM Webstream
- Website: Real Country 101.7 Online

WLQM-FM is a Full Service formatted broadcast radio station licensed to Franklin, Virginia, serving Western Tidewater. WLQM-FM is owned and operated by Franklin Broadcasting Corporation.
