= WDIC-FM =

- Clinchco, Virginia; United States
- Broadcast area: Clinchco, Virginia; Clintwood, Virginia; Grundy, Virginia
- Frequency: 92.1 MHz

Programming
- Format: Christian
- Affiliations: King of Kings Radio

Ownership
- Owner: Somerset Educational Broadcasting Foundation

History
- First air date: July 2, 1989
- Call sign meaning: Dickenson

Technical information
- Licensing authority: FCC
- Facility ID: 16905
- Class: A
- ERP: 2,500 watts
- HAAT: 154 meters (505 ft)
- Transmitter coordinates: 37°8′42.0″N 82°23′22.0″W

Links
- Public license information: Public file; LMS
- Webcast: Listen Live
- Website: kingofkingsradio.com

WDIC-FM (92.1 MHz) is radio station licensed to Clinchco, Virginia, serving Clinchco, Clintwood and Grundy in Virginia. WDIC-FM is owned by Somerset Educational Broadcasting Foundation.

== History ==
WDIC-FM began broadcasting on July 2, 1989, and was originally owned by Dickenson County Broadcasting Corporation, which also owned and operated country music formatted 1430 AM WDIC. It operated at 93.1 MHz and aired an adult contemporary format. In 1991, its frequency was changed to 92.1. In autumn of 1992, the station adopted an oldies format. Over the years, its format evolved to classic hits, and on June 15, 2021, the station switched to a classic country format.

The station became an affiliate of King of Kings Radio on February 10, 2026, with the sale of the station pending to King of Kings' operator Somerset Educational Broadcasting Foundation, for $20,000. The sale was consummated on April 15, 2026.
