= WJZU =

Radio station in Franklin, Virginia

- Franklin, Virginia; United States
- Broadcast area: Franklin, Virginia; Eastern Southampton County, Virginia; Southern Isle of Wight County, Virginia
- Frequency: 1250 kHz
- Branding: "Praise 99.1FM & 1250AM"

Programming
- Format: Black Gospel
- Affiliations: Rejoice! Musical Soul Food

Ownership
- Owner: Franklin Broadcasting Corporation
- Sister stations: WLQM-FM

History
- First air date: 1956
- Former call signs: WYSR (1956–1988); WLQM (1988–2019)

Technical information
- Licensing authority: FCC
- Facility ID: 52368
- Class: D
- Power: 1,000 Watts daytime only
- Transmitter coordinates: 36°40′57.0″N 76°55′43.0″W
- Translator: 99.1 W256DH (Franklin)

Links
- Public license information: Public file; LMS
- Website: www.downtownfranklinva.org/news/article/april/12/2019/praise-99.1%3A-franklin-broadcasting-corporation-new-gospel-station-

WJZU is a Black Gospel formatted broadcast radio station licensed to Franklin, Virginia, serving Franklin, Eastern Southampton County, Virginia and Southern Isle of Wight County, Virginia. WJZU is owned and operated by Franklin Broadcasting Corporation.
