= WXBX =

- Rural Retreat, Virginia; United States
- Broadcast area: Wytheville; Wythe County
- Frequency: 95.3 MHz
- Branding: Kool 95.3

Programming
- Format: Classic hits
- Affiliations: AP News; Westwood One

Ownership
- Owner: Three Rivers Media Corporation
- Sister stations: WLOY; WYVE

History
- First air date: 1991

Technical information
- Licensing authority: FCC
- Facility ID: 27189
- Class: A
- ERP: 6,000 watts
- HAAT: 58 meters (190 ft)
- Transmitter coordinates: 36°55′17″N 81°14′34″W

Links
- Public license information: Public file; LMS
- Webcast: Listen live
- Website: www.threeriversmedia.net

WXBX (95.3 FM) is a classic hits-formatted radio station licensed to Rural Retreat, Virginia, serving the Wytheville and Wythe County area. WXBX is owned and operated by Three Rivers Media Corporation.
