= WEQP =

- Rustburg, Virginia; United States
- Broadcast area: Lynchburg, Virginia; Campbell County, Virginia
- Frequency: 91.7 MHz
- Branding: Equip FM

Programming
- Format: Contemporary Christian

Ownership
- Owner: Calvary Chapel of Lynchburg
- Sister stations: WEQF-FM

History
- First air date: December 8, 2007
- Former call signs: WWEM (2007–2015)
- Call sign meaning: Equip

Technical information
- Licensing authority: FCC
- Facility ID: 81316
- Class: A
- ERP: 1,150 watts
- HAAT: 228 meters (748 ft)
- Transmitter coordinates: 37°17′7.0″N 79°5′26.0″W

Links
- Public license information: Public file; LMS
- Webcast: Listen live
- Website: WEOP Online

WEQP is a Contemporary Christian formatted broadcast radio station licensed to Rustburg, Virginia, serving Lynchburg and Campbell County, Virginia. WEQP is owned and operated by Calvary Chapel of Lynchburg.

== Translator ==
WEQP is simulcast on WRXT-HD2 (FM 90.3-2). This digital station is carried by a translator.

Broadcast translator for WRXT-HD2
| Call sign | Frequency | City of license | FID | ERP (W) | Class | FCC info |
|---|---|---|---|---|---|---|
| W230CH | 93.9 FM | Roanoke, Virginia | 139559 | 250 | D | LMS |
