= WXGM (AM) =

Radio station in Gloucester, Virginia

- Gloucester, Virginia; United States
- Broadcast area: Gloucester and Gloucester County
- Frequency: 1420 kHz
- Branding: The True Oldies Channel 1420 and 102.3

Programming
- Format: Oldies
- Affiliations: NBC News Radio; AccuWeather; The True Oldies Channel; Virginia News Network

Ownership
- Owner: WXGM, Inc.
- Sister stations: WXGM-FM

History
- First air date: 1957
- Former call signs: WRIP (1956, CP); WDDY (1956–1988)

Technical information
- Licensing authority: FCC
- Facility ID: 74208
- Class: D
- Power: 740 watts day 58 watts night
- Transmitter coordinates: 37°24′36.0″N 76°32′52.0″W
- Translator: 102.3 W272EJ (Gloucester)

Links
- Public license information: Public file; LMS
- Webcast: WXGM Webstream
- Website: xtra99.com

WXGM is an oldies-formatted broadcast radio station licensed to Gloucester, Virginia, serving Gloucester and Gloucester County, Virginia. WXGM is owned and operated by WXGM, Inc.

== History ==
=== WDDY ===
WDDY went on the air on January 20, 1957, becoming the first radio station in the Middle Peninsula. The station was owned by S. L. Goodman, the owner of a publishing firm in Richmond, though the station was almost immediately sold to WDDY, Inc.—owned by station manager Charles E. Springer—upon signing on the air. It broadcast during the daytime only with 1,000 watts. In 1958, Arthur Lazarow, a former announcer at WWJ radio in Detroit, acquired WDDY in 1958 by way of his company Cape Radio; minority investors in Cape included John R. Daniels and Arthur Shimmin. The station's full-service format included 12 hours a week each of African American and country programming in 1967.

Lazarow owned WDDY for 23 years until he sold it in 1981 for $90,000 to a new WDDY, Inc., owned by William Eure and Thomas Robinson of Petersburg, where they owned WSSV AM and WPLZ-FM. Despite not planning many changes at the outset, changes did come to WDDY: that summer, it relaunched with a country format and picked up coverage of Virginia Cavaliers football and the Washington Redskins. Eure and Robinson laid the groundwork for another change in the 80s by announcing their intention in 1984 to apply for an FM frequency. Eure's stake was subsequently purchased by a new corporation, WXGM, Inc., founded by Robinson and Walter Wurfel, an experienced radio executive who was then vice president of communications for the National Association of Broadcasters.

=== WXGM ===
Comprehensive changes came to 1420 AM on September 1, 1988 when the station was relaunched as WXGM with an oldies format. The overhaul also included $40,000 in equipment upgrades. Even more changes came on July 29, 1991, when WXGM-FM 99.1 launched; the FM and AM stations initially simulcast as adult contemporary "Xtra 99.1 FM". That same year, the AM station reduced its daytime power to 740 watts. Its sports coverage gained a regional appeal the next year when the station began what would be a 9-year relationship with the William & Mary Tribe; WXGM ended the deal abruptly in 2001 when it signed a more favorable deal to carry the athletic events of Christopher Newport University, in which CNU paid the station and offered to help sell advertising.

After Wurfel died in 2018 and Robinson died in 2020, ownership of the station passed to their widows, Sara Fitzgerald and Marva Paige Robinson.

== See also ==
- WDDY AM, Gloucester, Virginia, tribute site
