= WLOY (AM) =

- Rural Retreat, Virginia; United States
- Broadcast area: Rural Retreat, Virginia; Wythe County, Virginia
- Frequency: 660 kHz
- Branding: Loyal 93.3 WLOY

Programming
- Format: Oldies
- Affiliations: True Oldies Channel

Ownership
- Owner: Three Rivers Media; (Three Rivers Media Corporation)
- Sister stations: WXBX, WYVE

History
- First air date: 1985 (as WCRR)
- Former call signs: WCRR (1984–2007); WJRK (2007)

Technical information
- Licensing authority: FCC
- Facility ID: 27190
- Class: D
- Power: 550 watts day
- Transmitter coordinates: 36°55′17.0″N 81°14′34.0″W
- Translator: 93.3 W227DS (Rural Retreat)

Links
- Public license information: Public file; LMS
- Website: WLOY Online

WLOY (660 kHz) is an Oldies-formatted broadcast radio station licensed to Rural Retreat, Virginia, serving the Wytheville and Marion area. WLOY is owned and operated by Three Rivers Media.

== History ==
Until July 23, 2007, WLOY had been silent since its sale to Three Rivers Media from Ora Robert Smallwood on October 17, 2006.

On September 17, 2008, WLOY switched from Contemporary Christian to talk, dropping its affiliation with Salem's "Today's Christian Music" Network. In late August 2013, WLOY dropped its talk format for adult standards, branding as "Great American Music, Virginia Style, Loyal 660". The last part of the tagline changed to "Loyal 93.3" in 2020 when the station added a translator which covers most of the same area as the AM signal and provides 24-hour service.
