= WOWZ (AM) =

Radio station in Appomattox, Virginia (1974–2014)

Appomattox, Virginia; United States
- Broadcast area: Appomattox, Virginia; Appomattox County, Virginia
- Frequency: 1280 kHz

Programming
- Format: Defunct

Ownership
- Owner: Perception Media Group, Inc.; (Perception Media, Inc.)

History
- First air date: 1974
- Last air date: November 10, 2014
- Former call signs: WTTX (1974–1995); WWAR (1995–2002)

Technical information
- Facility ID: 8075
- Class: D
- Power: 1,000 watts daytime only
- Transmitter coordinates: 37°22′19.0″N 78°50′6.0″W

WOWZ was a broadcast radio station licensed to Appomattox, Virginia, serving Appomattox and Appomattox County, Virginia. WOWZ was owned and operated by Perception Media Group, Inc.

== History ==
The station was first licensed, as WTTX, on October 7, 1974. The call letters were changed to WWAR on June 1, 1995, and to WOWZ on February 15, 2002.

On March 4, 2010, WOWZ's owners, Perception Media Group, Inc., began the process to sell WOWZ to OneCom, Inc. for $10,000.

The station's owners surrendered the license for WOWZ to the Federal Communications Commission on November 10, 2014; the FCC cancelled the license on November 18, 2014.
