= WPIN (AM) =

Currently silent
- Dublin, Virginia; United States
- Broadcast area: New River Valley
- Frequency: 810 kHz
- Branding: ESPN Radio Blacksburg

Programming
- Format: Sports radio
- Affiliations: ESPN Radio; Carolina Panthers; Pulaski River Turtles

Ownership
- Owner: Baker Family Stations; (Dublin Radio)
- Sister stations: WKEX

History
- First air date: 1995
- Former call signs: WKNV (1989–1995)
- Call sign meaning: Pulaski Dublin

Technical information
- Licensing authority: FCC
- Facility ID: 17619
- Class: D
- Power: 4200 watts (days only)
- Transmitter coordinates: 37°7′55″N 80°37′7″W
- Translator: 97.1 W246CR (Christiansburg)

Links
- Public license information: Public file; LMS
- Webcast: Listen live
- Website: espnblacksburg.com

WPIN (810 kHz) is a sports radio formatted broadcast radio station licensed to Dublin, Virginia, serving the New River Valley. WPIN is owned and operated by Baker Family Stations.

AM 810 is United States clear-channel frequency, on which KSFO in San Francisco, California, and WGY in Schenectady, New York, are the dominant Class A stations. WPIN must leave the air from sunset to sunrise to prevent interference with the Class A stations nighttime skywave signals.

On September 30, 2025, WPIN and its FM translators ceased operations.

== FM translators ==
In addition the main station at 810 kHz, WPIN is relayed by one FM translators to widen its broadcast area, especially at night when the AM frequency is off the air.

Broadcast translator for WPIN
Call sign	Frequency	City of license	FID	ERP (W)	HAAT	Class	FCC info
W246CR	97.1 FM	Christiansburg, Virginia	140358	145	365 m (1,198 ft)	D	LMS
