= WGVY =

- Altavista, Virginia; United States
- Broadcast area: Southern Campbell County, Virginia; Northern Pittsylvania County, Virginia
- Frequency: 1000 kHz
- Branding: 102.3 The Groove

Programming
- Format: Oldies

Ownership
- Owner: David and Elizabeth Hoehne; (D.J. Broadcasting, Inc.)
- Sister stations: WKDE-FM

History
- First air date: April 29, 1962 (as WKDE)
- Former call signs: WKDE (1962–2018)
- Call sign meaning: GrooVY

Technical information
- Licensing authority: FCC
- Facility ID: 21415
- Class: D
- Power: 1,000 watts daytime only
- Transmitter coordinates: 37°7′20.0″N 79°17′20″W
- Translator: 102.3 W272EO (Lynchburg)

Links
- Public license information: Public file; LMS
- Webcast: Listen Live
- Website: groove102.com

WGVY is an oldies formatted broadcast radio station licensed to Altavista, Virginia, serving Southern Campbell and Northern Pittsylvania counties in Virginia. WGVY is owned and operated by D.J. Broadcasting, Inc.

== Translator ==
The FM translator operates 24 hours per day from a transmitter site near Lynchburg. The AM signal operates during daytime only.

Call sign	Frequency	City of license	FID	ERP (W)	HAAT	Class	FCC info
W272EO	102.3 FM	Lynchburg, Virginia	200986	99	194 m (636 ft)	D	LMS

== Previous logo ==
(WGVY's logo under previous 102.1 translator)
