= WLCQ-LP =

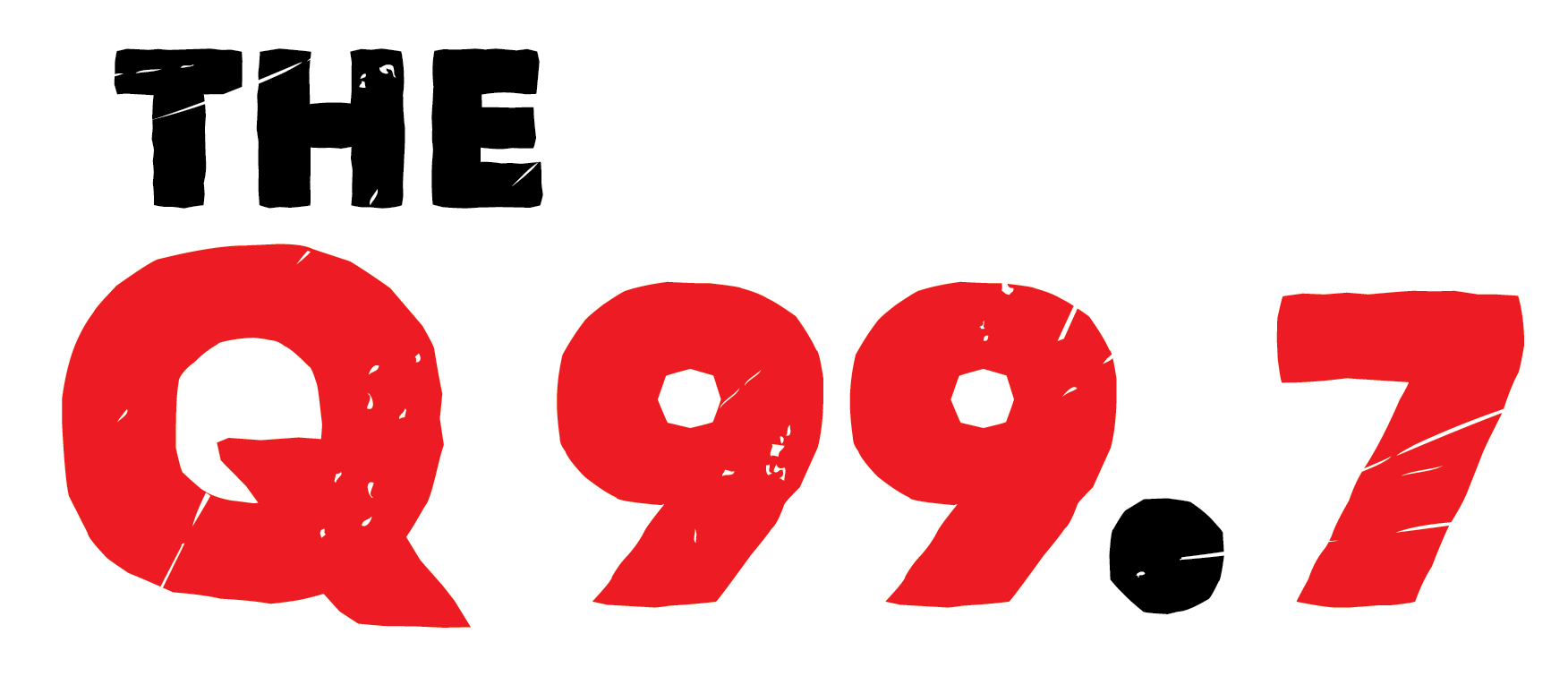
- Feeding Hills, Massachusetts; United States
- Broadcast area: Springfield, Massachusetts
- Frequency: 99.7 MHz
- Branding: The Q 99.7

Programming
- Format: Christian contemporary

Ownership
- Owner: Lighthouse Christian Center

History
- First air date: October 29, 2006

Technical information
- Licensing authority: FCC
- Facility ID: 133854
- Class: L1
- ERP: 100 watts
- HAAT: 28.9 meters (95 ft)
- Transmitter coordinates: 42°4′56.9″N 72°38′49.4″W
- Translator: 97.5 W248CR (Windsor, Connecticut)

Links
- Public license information: LMS
- Webcast: Listen live
- Website: www.theq997.com

WLCQ-LP (99.7 FM, "The Q 99.7") is a radio station licensed to serve Feeding Hills, Massachusetts, United States. The station is owned by Lighthouse Christian Center. It airs a Christian contemporary music format.

The station was assigned the WLCQ-LP call letters by the Federal Communications Commission (FCC) on June 18, 2005.

== FCC troubles ==
In October 2015, Saga Communications filed a petition to revoke the license of WLCQ-LP under a claim of interference with their Northampton-licensed station WLZX-FM 99.3. Saga accused WLCQ-LP of several technical errors of their license, including operating their transmitter "more than a football field" from the licensed location, as well as changing antennas from a "one bay to a two bay" without prior notification to the commission, among other errors. WLCQ-LP filed to correct the errors with the FCC in November 2015. The status of the objection, construction permit to correct facilities, and special temporary authority have been resolved with the commission as the FCC struck down Saga's complaints.

== Translator ==
WLCQ-LP's programming is also heard on a translator station in Windsor, Connecticut, W248CR (97.5 FM). The translator is separately owned by Conduit Communications, who bought it in late 2025 from Gois Broadcasting; before the sale, W248CR carried the urban programming of Gois-owned WKND.

Call sign	Frequency	City of license	FID	ERP (W)	HAAT	Class	Transmitter coordinates	FCC info
W248CR	97.5 FM	Windsor, Connecticut	139032	250	49 m (161 ft)	D	41°51′12.3″N 72°40′41.3″W	LMS
