= WDIC (AM) =

- Clinchco, Virginia; United States
- Broadcast area: Clinchco, Virginia; Dickenson County, Virginia
- Frequency: 1430 kHz

Ownership
- Owner: Dickenson County Broadcasting Corporation
- Sister stations: WDIC-FM

History
- First air date: May 1961
- Last air date: September 30, 2020
- Call sign meaning: Dickenson County

Technical information
- Facility ID: 16904
- Class: D
- Power: 5,000 watts (day); 54 watts (night)
- Transmitter coordinates: 37°8′42.0″N 82°23′22.0″W

WDIC was a Country-formatted broadcast radio station licensed to Clinchco, Virginia, serving Clinchco and Dickenson County, Virginia. WDIC was last owned and operated by Dickenson County Broadcasting Corporation. Its license was surrendered and cancelled on September 30, 2020.
