= WKDE-FM =

- Altavista, Virginia; United States
- Broadcast area: Altavista, Virginia; Bedford, Virginia; Lynchburg, Virginia
- Frequency: 105.5 MHz
- Branding: 105-5 KD Country

Programming
- Format: Classic Country
- Affiliations: ABC Radio News; Real Country (Westwood One)

Ownership
- Owner: D.J. Broadcasting, Inc.
- Sister stations: WGVY

History
- First air date: June 30, 1969
- Former call signs: WKDE-FM (1981–1987); WKHV (1987–1990); WKDE-FM (1990–Present)

Technical information
- Licensing authority: FCC
- Facility ID: 21414
- Class: A
- ERP: 6,000 Watts
- HAAT: 100 meters (330 ft)
- Transmitter coordinates: 37°9′37.0″N 79°13′28.0″W

Links
- Public license information: Public file; LMS
- Webcast: WKDE-FM Webstream
- Website: WKDE-FM Online

WKDE-FM is a Classic Country formatted broadcast radio station licensed to Altavista, Virginia, serving Altavista, Bedford, and Lynchburg in Virginia. WKDE-FM is owned and operated by D.J. Broadcasting, Inc.
