= KFLO-LP =

- Jonesboro, Arkansas; United States
- Frequency: 102.9 MHz

Programming
- Format: 60s, 70s, 80s, and some Hits

Ownership
- Owner: American Heritage Media Inc.

Technical information
- Licensing authority: FCC
- Facility ID: 134653
- Class: L1
- ERP: 100 watts
- HAAT: 32.2 meters (106 feet)
- Transmitter coordinates: 35°49′04″N 90°42′36″W

Links
- Public license information: LMS
- Website: http://www.kflo.org

KFLO-LP (102.9 FM) is a radio station licensed to serve Jonesboro, Arkansas. The station is owned by American Heritage Media Inc. It airs an Oldies format.

The station was assigned the KFLO-LP call letters by the Federal Communications Commission on January 10, 2003.
