= WNRG (AM) =

- Grundy, Virginia; United States
- Broadcast area: Grundy, Virginia; Buchanan County, Virginia
- Frequency: 940 kHz
- Branding: Solid Gospel 940 WNRG

Programming
- Format: Southern Gospel
- Affiliations: Salem's "Southern Gospel Network"

Ownership
- Owner: Peggy Sue Broadcasting Corporation
- Sister stations: WMJD

History
- First air date: 1955
- Call sign meaning: W GRuNdy backwards

Technical information
- Licensing authority: FCC
- Facility ID: 70347
- Class: D
- Power: 5,000 Watts daytime 14 Watts nighttime
- Transmitter coordinates: 37°18′8.0″N 82°7′4.0″W

Links
- Public license information: Public file; LMS

WNRG is a Southern Gospel-formatted broadcast radio station licensed to Grundy, Virginia, serving Grundy and Buchanan County, Virginia. WNRG is owned and operated by Peggy Sue Broadcasting Corporation.
