= WRAR (AM) =

- Tappahannock, Virginia; United States
- Broadcast area: Tappahannock, Virginia; Warsaw, Virginia
- Frequency: 1000 kHz

Ownership
- Owner: A.C.T.I.O.N., Incorporated

History
- First air date: November 1, 1970
- Last air date: May 1, 2013
- Call sign meaning: Rappahannock River

Technical information
- Facility ID: 55170
- Class: D
- Power: 300 watts daytime only
- Transmitter coordinates: 37°52′27″N 76°43′37″W

WRAR was a broadcast radio station licensed to Tappahannock, Virginia, serving Tappahannock and Warsaw in Virginia. The station was last owned and operated by A.C.T.I.O.N., Incorporated.

== History ==
The station began broadcasting on November 1, 1970. In the 1980s, the station aired a MOR-adult contemporary format. WRAR last aired a religious format as an affiliate of the LifeTalk Radio Network. The station's last owner was A.C.T.I.O.N., Inc. WRAR left the air on May 1, 2013, for financial reasons; it was deleted on November 21, 2014.
