= WJFN (AM) =

Simulcast of WJFN-FM, Goochland, VA
- Chester, Virginia; United States
- Broadcast area: Richmond, Virginia; Petersburg, Virginia
- Frequency: 820 kHz
- Branding: Newstalk WJFN

Programming
- Format: Conservative talk radio
- Affiliations: Townhall; Westwood One; Pittsburgh Steelers; West Virginia Mountaineers

Ownership
- Owner: John Fredericks; (Disruptor Radio LLC)
- Sister stations: WJFN-FM

History
- First air date: 1964
- Former call signs: WIKI (1963–1978); WGGM (1978–2014); WNTW (2014–2020)
- Former frequencies: 1410 kHz (1964–1988)
- Call sign meaning: John Fredericks (owner)

Technical information
- Licensing authority: FCC
- Facility ID: 27440
- Class: B
- Power: 10,000 watts (day); 1,000 watts (night)
- Transmitter coordinates: 37°22′54.5″N 77°25′38.9″W
- Translators: 92.7 W224EB (Chester); 107.7 W299DB (Richmond)

Links
- Public license information: Public file; LMS
- Webcast: Listen live
- Website: wjfnradio.com

WJFN (820 AM) is a radio station licensed to Chester, Virginia, United States, serving the Richmond/Petersburg area. Owned by John Fredericks and operated by MAGA Radio Network, it carries a conservative talk radio format as a simulcast of WJFN-FM (100.5). WJFN also transmits on FM translator W224EB (92.7 FM), based in Chester, Virginia.

== History ==
The station officially signed on the air in 1964 with the call letters WIKI. Licensed to Chester, Virginia, it was owned by WIKI Radio, Inc. and operated as a daytime-only station on 1410 kHz with a power of 1,000 watts. By the mid-1960s, the station increased its daytime power to 5,000 watts, broadcasting from a transmitter and studio site located on Jefferson Davis Highway.

In 1978, the station was sold to Hoffman Communications, which changed the call sign to WGGM. Under the WGGM identity, the station adopted a contemporary Christian and gospel music format. Throughout the early and mid-1980s, the station remained a "daytimer," meaning it was required to sign off the air at sunset to protect other stations on the 1410 frequency.

In June 1988, WGGM, formerly a daytimer at AM 1410 on the dial, moved to the 820 frequency, allowing 24-hour broadcasting. Tracy Lynn, longtime local television traffic reporter at WWBT, was the first nighttime DJ on WGGM.

In May 2014, VARTV reported the station's plans to change call letters to WNTW and switch to syndicated conservative talk as "The Answer" at 8 a.m. on Monday, June 2. The call sign was officially changed to WNTW on June 1.

Effective June 16, 2020, John Fredericks' Disruptor Radio acquired WNTW and W224EB for $240,000. The call letters were changed to WJFN on June 17, 2020, matching WJFN-FM 100.5, which this station began to simulcast.

== Translator ==
In addition to the main station, WJFN is relayed by two FM translators:

Call sign	Frequency	City of license	FID	ERP (W)	HAAT	Class	FCC info
W224EB	92.7 FM	Chester, Virginia	202858	250	114 m (374 ft)	D	LMS
W299DB	107.7 FM	Richmond, Virginia	51896	30	131 m (430 ft)	D	LMS
