= WCVA (AM) =

Simulcasting WOJL Louisa
- Culpeper, Virginia; United States
- Broadcast area: Culpeper, Virginia; Culpeper County, Virginia
- Frequency: 1490 kHz
- Branding: Classic Hits 105.5 & 95.3, Sam FM

Programming
- Format: Classic hits
- Affiliations: Classic Hits (Westwood One)

Ownership
- Owner: Piedmont Communications, Inc.
- Sister stations: WJMA, WOJL, WVCV

History
- First air date: February 20, 1949
- Call sign meaning: Culpeper, Virginia

Technical information
- Licensing authority: FCC
- Facility ID: 14711
- Class: C
- Power: 680 watts unlimited
- Transmitter coordinates: 38°29′4.0″N 77°59′22.0″W
- Translator: 95.3 W237CA (Culpeper)

Links
- Public license information: Public file; LMS
- Webcast: Listen Live
- Website: WCVA Online

WCVA (1490 AM) is a broadcast radio station licensed to Culpeper, Virginia, serving Culpeper and Culpeper County, Virginia. WCVA is owned and operated by Piedmont Communications, Inc. and simulcasts the classic hits format of sister station 105.5 WOJL Louisa. Prior to February 2016, it had aired a satellite-fed adult standards format.

== Translator ==
In early 2016, WCVA's programming began airing on 95.3 W237CA, an FM translator that had been purchased by Piedmont from Liberty University.

| Call sign | Frequency | City of license | FID | ERP (W) | HAAT | Class | FCC info |
|---|---|---|---|---|---|---|---|
| W237CA | 95.3 FM | Culpeper, Virginia | 139551 | 178 | 84 m (276 ft) | D | LMS |
