= WHEE =

- Martinsville, Virginia; United States
- Broadcast area: Martinsville, Virginia; Henry County, Virginia
- Frequency: 1370 kHz
- Branding: AM1370 WHEE

Programming
- Format: Full-service
- Affiliations: ABC News Radio; AccuWeather; CBS Radio News; Virginia News Network; Washington Nationals Radio Network

Ownership
- Owner: Martinsville Media, Inc.
- Sister stations: WYAT-LD

History
- First air date: August 4, 1954

Technical information
- Licensing authority: FCC
- Facility ID: 51825
- Class: D
- Power: 5,000 watts (days only)
- Transmitter coordinates: 36°41′9.0″N 79°54′14.0″W

Links
- Public license information: Public file; LMS
- Webcast: Listen live
- Website: martinsvillemedia.com/whee

WHEE is a Full Service formatted broadcast radio station licensed to Martinsville, Virginia, serving Martinsville and Henry County, Virginia. WHEE is owned and operated by Martinsville Media, Inc. It has held the callsign WHEE since 1954.
