= WGTH (AM) =

- Richlands, Virginia; United States
- Broadcast area: Southwestern Virginia; Southeastern West Virginia
- Frequency: 540 kHz
- Branding: The Sheep

Programming
- Format: Southern gospel; religious

Ownership
- Owner: High Knob Broadcasters, Inc.
- Sister stations: WGTH-FM

History
- First air date: October 5, 1951
- Former call signs: WRIC (1951–1995)
- Call sign meaning: "Gates to Heaven"

Technical information
- Licensing authority: FCC
- Facility ID: 12043
- Class: D
- Power: 1,000 watts (day); 97 watts (night)
- Transmitter coordinates: 37°5′1.4″N 81°46′57.4″W

Links
- Public license information: Public file; LMS
- Webcast: Listen live
- Website: www.wgth.net

WGTH is a southern gospel and religious-formatted broadcast radio station licensed to Richlands, Virginia, serving Southwestern Virginia and Southeastern West Virginia. WGTH is owned and operated by High Knob Broadcasters, Inc.
