= WJFN-FM =

News/talk radio station in Goochland, Virginia

- Goochland, Virginia; United States
- Broadcast area: Goochland, Virginia; Goochland County, Virginia
- Frequency: 100.5 MHz
- Branding: Newstalk WJFN

Programming
- Format: Conservative talk
- Affiliations: Genesis Communications Network; Townhall; Westwood One; Pittsburgh Steelers; West Virginia Mountaineers

Ownership
- Owner: John Fredericks; (MAGA Radio Network, LLC)
- Sister stations: WJFN

History
- First air date: 2001
- Former call signs: WZEZ (2000–2017); WLRB (2017–2018); WVNZ-FM (2018); WJFN (2018–2020)
- Call sign meaning: John Fredericks (owner)

Technical information
- Licensing authority: FCC
- Facility ID: 87127
- Class: A
- ERP: 2,600 watts
- HAAT: 155.2 meters (509 ft)
- Transmitter coordinates: 37°47′37.5″N 77°55′56″W
- Repeater: 820 WJFN (Chester)

Links
- Public license information: Public file; LMS
- Webcast: Listen live
- Website: wjfnradio.com

WJFN-FM (100.5 MHz) is a conservative talk-formatted broadcast radio station licensed to Goochland, Virginia, serving Goochland and Goochland County, Virginia. WJFN-FM is owned by John Fredericks, through licensee MAGA Radio Network, LLC. Fredericks hosts the weekday morning show at the station, with other daily shows including syndicated talkers Mark Levin and Steve Bannon.

== History ==
As WZEZ, the station broadcast a soft adult contemporary format as "EZ 100.5" until February 1, 2014, when Red Zebra Broadcasting began programming it under a local marketing agreement with a simulcast of sports station WXGI, under the "Sports FM 100.5" branding. Educational Media Foundation acquired WZEZ from the Delmarva Educational Association for $125,000 in 2016 and made it Richmond's K-Love station; on February 1, 2017, the call sign was changed to WLRB.

EMF sold WLRB to Truth Broadcasting Corporation (whose principals, Stuart and Nancy Epperson, are also associated with Delmarva Educational Association) for $150,000 in 2018; while the sale was taking place, the station changed its call sign to WVNZ-FM on July 24 and began carrying Radio Nueva Vida. The call sign was changed to WJFN on September 27, 2018; that October, John Fredericks began leasing the station to program a conservative talk format. Fredericks bought the station outright for $155,000 effective December 20, 2019.

Through sister company Disruptor Radio, John Fredericks agreed to buy similarly-formatted WNTW in Chester from Delmarva Educational Association in 2020; WNTW already carried Fredericks' program, an arrangement that predated his acquisition of WJFN. WJFN added the "-FM" suffix to its call sign on April 6, 2020, allowing Disruptor to request the unsuffixed WJFN callsign for WNTW.
