= WPAR =

Christian radio station in Salem, Virginia

Spirit FM flagship station
- Salem, Virginia; United States
- Broadcast area: Roanoke; Lynchburg metropolitan area
- Frequency: 91.3 MHz
- Branding: Spirit FM

Programming
- Format: Christian adult contemporary

Ownership
- Owner: Positive Alternative Radio, Inc.

History
- First air date: September 8, 1993
- Call sign meaning: Positive Alternative Radio

Technical information
- Licensing authority: FCC
- Facility ID: 53097
- Class: C3
- ERP: 3,300 watts
- HAAT: 270 meters (890 ft)
- Transmitter coordinates: 37°22′23″N 79°55′37″W

Links
- Public license information: Public file; LMS
- Webcast: Listen live
- Website: www.spiritfm.com

WPAR (91.3 MHz) is a non-commercial FM radio station licensed to Salem, Virginia, and serving the Roanoke-Lynchburg metropolitan area. It is the flagship of "Spirit FM", a group of Christian adult contemporary stations owned by Positive Alternative Radio, which is headquartered in Blacksburg. The stations are listener-supported and hold periodic fundraisers on the air. WPAR has studios and offices on Timberlake Road in Lynchburg.

Positive Alternative Radio operates a network of full-power stations and FM translators, stretching from North Carolina and West Virginia through the Shenandoah Valley, to the fringes of the Richmond metropolitan area. WPAR has an effective radiated power (ERP) of 3,300 watts. Its transmitter is on Tinker Top Road in Hollins, Virginia. WRXT 90.3 FM, a rebroadcaster of WPAR, uses HD technology for its transmissions.

== Simulcasts ==
Call sign	Frequency	City of license	State	Facility ID	ERP (W)	Class
WOKD-FM	91.1 FM	Danville	Virginia	82092	18,000	C2
WPIN-FM	91.5 FM	Dublin	Virginia	53090	85	A
WOKG	90.3 FM	Galax	Virginia	87377	2,700	C3
WPIM	90.5 FM	Martinsville	Virginia	40508	4,000	A
WRXT	90.3 FM (HD)	Roanoke	Virginia	70358	5,500	C2
WPVA	90.1 FM	Waynesboro	Virginia	53099	2,500	B1
WPIB	91.1 FM	Bluefield	West Virginia	53098	12,000	C1
WSGH	1040 AM	Lewisville	North Carolina	72967	9,100	D

=== Translators ===
Call sign	Frequency (MHz)	City of license	State	Facility ID	Rebroadcasts
W253BH	98.5	Blacksburg	Virginia	53096	WPIN-FM
W294BY	106.7	Charlottesville	Virginia	142782	WPVA
W226AT	93.1	Christiansburg	Virginia	140350	WRXT
W290CU	105.9	Christiansburg	Virginia	140362	WPAR
W254AH	98.7	Farmville	Virginia	18879	WPVA
W277CY	103.3	Harrisonburg	Virginia	141355	WPVA
W295AI	106.9	Marion	Virginia	142575	WPIB
W279AC	103.7	Roanoke	Virginia	70360	WRXT (FM/HD1)
