= WEQF-FM =

- Dillwyn, Virginia; United States
- Broadcast area: Dillwyn, Virginia; Buckingham, Virginia; Buckingham County, Virginia
- Frequency: 105.3 MHz
- Branding: EquipFM

Programming
- Format: Religious
- Affiliations: United News and Information

Ownership
- Owner: Calvary Chapel of Lynchburg
- Sister stations: WEQP

History
- First air date: July 2000
- Former call signs: WBCS (1997–1998); WBNN-FM (1998–2016)
- Call sign meaning: EquipFM

Technical information
- Licensing authority: FCC
- Facility ID: 85488
- Class: A
- ERP: 6,000 watts
- HAAT: 100 meters (330 ft)
- Transmitter coordinates: 37°34′50.0″N 78°37′18.0″W

Links
- Public license information: Public file; LMS
- Webcast: Listen live
- Website: equipfm.org

WEQF-FM is a Religious formatted broadcast radio station licensed to Dillwyn, Virginia, serving Buckingham County, Virginia. WEQF-FM is owned and operated by Calvary Chapel of Lynchburg.
