= Middle Peninsula =

Peninsula in Virginia, US

Coordinates: 37°36′10″N 76°39′15″W

Map of Virginia with the Middle Peninsula in red.

The Middle Peninsula or Middle Neck is the second of three large peninsulas on the western shore of the Chesapeake Bay in Virginia. To the north the Rappahannock River separates it from the Northern Neck peninsula. To the south the York River separates it from the Virginia Peninsula. It encompasses six Virginia counties: Essex, Gloucester, King and Queen, King William, Mathews, and Middlesex. Developed for tobacco plantations in the colonial era, in the 21st century the Middle Peninsula is known for its quiet rural life, vegetable truck-farming, and fishing industry. As of the 2020 census, the Middle Peninsula was home to 92,886 people.

There are no cities on the Middle Peninsula and little industry. Among the towns found there, West Point has a pulp-and-paper mill. The unincorporated community of Deltaville is a popular spot for city-dwellers seeking a weekend boating on the bay. Tappahannock is a thriving community on the Rappahannock River, and Urbanna has a small but prosperous tourism industry.

Two small land reservations are home to the state-recognized Pamunkey and Mattaponi Indian tribes.

The primary highways on the peninsula are U.S. Route 17 (Tidewater Trail), which connects Fredericksburg with the Hampton Roads area, and U.S. Route 360 (Northumberland Highway), which connects the Northern Neck with Richmond and Danville. Before modern highways existed, passenger ferries and steam freighters linked the entire Chesapeake Bay region.

The two southernmost counties on the Middle Peninsula, Gloucester and Mathews, are now considered to be part of the Hampton Roads metropolitan area. Gloucester County is connected to the Virginia Peninsula by the George P. Coleman Memorial Bridge, which spans the York River. King William County and King and Queen County to the west are part of the Richmond Metropolitan Statistical Area (MSA).

== See also ==
- U.S. Route 17 in Virginia
- U.S. Route 360 in Virginia
