= WREN-LP =

- Charlottesville, Virginia; United States
- Broadcast area: Charlottesville, Virginia; Albemarle County, Virginia
- Frequency: 97.9 MHz
- Branding: 97.9 The Wren

Programming
- Format: Classic hits; Oldies

Ownership
- Owner: Genesis Communications

History
- First air date: March 14, 2016; 10 years ago
- Call sign meaning: Wren

Technical information
- Licensing authority: FCC
- Facility ID: 194996
- Class: L1
- ERP: 22 watts
- HAAT: 62 meters (203 ft)
- Transmitter coordinates: 38°4′39.5″N 78°28′20″W

Links
- Public license information: LMS
- Webcast: Listen live
- Website: 979wren.org

Former simulcast
- WKMZ-LP
- Ruckersville, Virginia; United States
- Broadcast area: Greene County, Virginia
- Frequency: 96.5 MHz

Ownership
- Owner: Gateway Media

History
- First air date: February 9, 2017; 9 years ago
- Last air date: October 11, 2019; 6 years ago

Technical information
- Facility ID: 192447
- Class: L1
- ERP: 100 watts
- HAAT: 23 meters (75 ft)
- Transmitter coordinates: 38°13′59.4″N 78°22′7″W

WREN-LP (97.9 FM) is a classic hits and oldies formatted broadcast radio station licensed to Charlottesville, Virginia, serving Charlottesville and Albemarle County in Virginia. WREN-LP is owned and operated by Genesis Communications. The station was formerly simulcast on WKMZ-LP (96.5 FM) in nearby Ruckersville.

== WKMZ-LP ==
WKMZ-LP was a broadcast radio station licensed to Ruckersville, Virginia, and serving Greene County, Virginia. WKMZ-LP was owned by Gateway Media, consisting of former Stu-Comm, Inc. board member Jon G. Hall, WNRN announcer John "Rusty" Cempre, and Robert M. Johnson. The station aired an oldies format, simulcasting the programming of WREN-LP 97.9 in Charlottesville. The station was taken silent on October 11, 2019, and its license was cancelled April 15, 2021, as the station had been off the air for more than one year.
