= WINC =

WINC may refer to:

== Present use ==
- WINC (AM), a radio station (1400 AM) licensed to serve Winchester, Virginia, United States
- WINC-FM, a radio station (105.5 FM) licensed to serve Berryville, Virginia

== Past use ==
- WAIW (FM), a radio station (92.5 FM) licensed to serve Winchester, Virginia, which held the call sign WINC-FM from 1946 to 1949 and again from 1981 to 2020

== See also ==
- Winc, an Australian office supplies company
