= Centennial Broadcasting =

American radio broadcasting company

- Type: Privately owned
- Industry: Radio
- Genre: Radio broadcasting company
- Headquarters: Clemmons, North Carolina, United States
- Area served: Fredericksburg, Virginia
- Key people: Allen B. Shaw (President/CEO)
- Total assets: 3 FM station 2 AM stations
- Website: Official website

Centennial Broadcasting is a small market radio broadcasting company based in Clemmons, North Carolina. The company is led by President and CEO Allen B. Shaw. Shaw began his career in 1959, at the age of 15, at radio station WRWB in Kissimmee, Florida.

== History ==
=== 1997–2000 ===
Centennial purchased Las Vegas–based KQOL from American General Media for an undisclosed sum on May 13, 1997. Two months later, on July 22, 1997, the company bought another Las Vegas station, KJUL, also for an undisclosed amount. In March 1998, Sinclair Broadcast Group sold three New Orleans–based stations to the company for $16 million. The stations included two FMs, WRNO-FM and KMEZ, and one AM, WBYU. In April of the same year, Centennial purchased Las Vegas station KKLZ from Apogee Companies for $21 million. The company sold all six of its stations to Beasley Broadcast Group in late 2000 for $113.5 million.

=== Since 2004 ===
The company would re-enter the radio business, this time in Virginia, with the purchase of Lynchburg, Virginia-area stations WZZI (then at 101.5) and WZZU from Travis Media LLC on August 31, 2004, for $4.146 million. In 2005, the company purchased WLNI from 3 Daughters Media for $4.4 million. Centennial filed suit on 3 Daughters Media and owner Gary Burns in 2006 for violating a five-year non-compete agreement. The case was heard in the United States District Court for the Western District of Virginia. U.S. District Judge Norman Moon ruled 3 Daughters Media "could not operate a station with a Talk format until the five-year non-compete" had ended on August 4, 2006. Burns appealed to United States Court of Appeals for the Fourth Circuit, which upheld the previous court's ruling. In March 2005, Cumulus Media sold WBWR and translator W247AD-FM to Centennial for $1.9 million. The deal closed in April of the same year.

On May 17, 2007, Centennial announced it was buying WINC, WINC-FM, WWRT, and WWRE in Winchester and WBQB and WFVA in Fredericksburg from Mid-Atlantic Network Inc. for $36 million. Later reports had the price of the sale at $35.972 million. Shaw, commenting in a Winchester Star interview on the sale, said he had been considering buying the stations for several months. The sale closed in August 2007.

In April 2008, the company agreed to purchase four stations from Univision Radio in Albuquerque, New Mexico, for $24 million. The sale included stations KIOT, KJFA, KKRG, and KKSS. For unknown reasons, the sale was never completed and the stations remain owned by Univision.

On February 1, 2011, WVMP was sold to CityWorks Community Broadcasting LLC for $500,000. Centennial sold WZZU and WZZI (now on 106.9 MHz), then airing an Active Rock format, to WVJT, LLC. for $523,000 on August 27, 2012. Mel Wheeler Inc. purchased W247AD-FM from Centennial for $75,000 on April 4, 2012. A year later, Centennial sold WLNI to Mel Wheeler Inc. on January 12, 2013, for $1.025 million. That sale was delayed due to a "petition to deny" filed with the Federal Communications Commission (FCC). Gary Burns, owner of 3 Daughters Media, contented the sale would give Mel Wheeler Inc. control of too many stations in one market. The FCC disagreed and denied the "petition to deny" in August 2013.

On October 6, 2020, Centennial sold WINC-FM operating on 92.5 MHz from Winchester, Virginia, to Educational Media Foundation (EMF) for $1.75 million. WINC-FM's existing music programming moved to the co-owned WXBN (105.5 FM) and WZFC (104.9 FM) ahead of the sale;, and Centennial retained the rights to the WINC callsign and branding. On December 29, 2020, after the sale of the 92.5 FM channel closed, Centennial transferred the WINC-FM callsign to 105.5 MHz. WZFC continued to simulcast WINC-FM's programming.

On August 13, 2025, Centennial purchased Superhits 95.9 (WGRQ) and Thunder 104.5 (WGRX) from Telemedia Broadcasting. Superhits 95.9 was subsequently rebranded to 95.9 The Goat.

== Stations ==
Centennial Broadcasting currently owns and operates four stations in Fredericksburg, Virginia:

=== Fredericksburg ===
| Call sign | Frequency | Format | Website | Source |
|---|---|---|---|---|
| WBQB | 101.5 FM | Adult contemporary | www.b1015.com | |
| WGRQ | 95.9 FM | Classic hits | www.959thegoat.com | |
| WGRX | 104.5 FM | Country | www.thunder1045.com | |
| WFVA | 1230 AM | News/talk/sports | www.wfvaradio.com | |

=== Formerly owned stations ===
| Call sign | Frequency | City of license | Years owned | Current status |
|---|---|---|---|---|
| KSTJ | 102.7 FM | Las Vegas, Nevada | 1997–2000 | KVGS, owned by Beasley Broadcast Group |
| KJUL | 104.3 FM | Las Vegas, Nevada | 1997–2000 | KVPH, owned by VCY America |
| WRNO-FM | 99.5 FM | New Orleans, Louisiana | 1998–2000 | Owned by iHeartMedia |
| KMEZ | 102.9 FM | New Orleans, Louisiana | 1998–2000 | Owned by Cumulus Media |
| WBYU | 1450 AM | New Orleans, Louisiana | 1998–2000 | Defunct, license cancelled in 2012 |
| WZZI | 101.5 FM | Roanoke, Virginia | 2004–2011 | WYHR, owned by Bible Broadcasting Network |
| WZZU | 97.9 FM | Lynchburg, Virginia | 2004–2012 | Owned by Mel Wheeler, Inc. |
| WLNI | 105.9 FM | Lynchburg, Virginia | 2005–2012 | Owned by James River Media, LLC |
| WBWR | 106.9 FM | Bedford, Virginia | 2005–2012 | WLGX, owned by Educational Media Foundation |
| WINC | 1400 AM | Winchester, Virginia | 2007–2021 | Owned by Colonial Radio Group |
| WINC-FM | 92.5 FM | Winchester, Virginia | 2007–2020 | WAIW, owned by Educational Media Foundation |
| WXBN | 105.5 FM | Winchester, Virginia | 2007–2021 | WINC-FM, owned by Euclid Avenue Properties |
| WZFC | 104.9 FM | Winchester, Virginia | 2007–2021 | WVRX, owned by Point FM Ministries |
