= WNDC =

Currently silent
- Leesburg, Virginia; United States
- Broadcast area: Washington metropolitan area
- Frequency: 1190 kHz

Programming
- Language: English

Ownership
- Owner: Richard Wiles; (Faith & Values Media Group, Inc.)

History
- First air date: March 6, 1958
- Former call signs: WAGE (1956–2011); WCRW (2011–2023); WTSD (2023–2026)
- Former frequencies: 1290 kHz (1958–1985); 1200 kHz (1985–2011)
- Call sign meaning: Washington, D.C.

Technical information
- Licensing authority: FCC
- Facility ID: 54876
- Class: B
- Power: 50,000 watts (day); 1,200 watts (night)
- Transmitter coordinates: 39°2′28.4″N 77°26′41″W

Links
- Public license information: Public file; LMS

WNDC (1190 kHz) is an AM radio station licensed to Leesburg, Virginia, and serving the Washington metropolitan area. WNDC is owned by Richard Wiles' Faith & Values Media Group, and its transmitter site is located in Ashburn, Virginia.

== History ==
=== WAGE ===
The station first signed on the air on March 6, 1958. Its original call sign was WAGE, broadcasting on 1290 kHz. For its first 37 years on the air, WAGE was a 1,000-watt daytimer, required to go off the air at sunset to protect other stations on 1290 AM. It was started by Richard Field Lewis Jr., who also founded WINC in Winchester and WFVA in Fredericksburg. The original studio and transmitter site was a field behind Loudoun County High School in Leesburg. To this day, the street on which the studio stood is named Wage Drive.

An apocryphal story claims that CBS host and Leesburg resident Arthur Godfrey was the original owner, and the call sign stood for Arthur Godfrey Enterprises. In fact, the construction permit was owned by Lewis and passed to his widow upon his death in 1957. The call sign was reassigned from what is now WHEN in Syracuse, New York, and was almost certainly sequential as it had no known meaning in either city. Once built, the station was sold first to William T. Stubblefield and again in 1962, to a group headed by James and Valeria Symington.

In 1985, WAGE moved to 1200 kHz, allowing the use of a stronger full-time signal. While WAGE covered local news throughout its history, the format changed over the years, going from classical music, to easy listening, to country music, to middle of the road.

WAGE was sold to WUST owner New World Radio Group, through its subsidiary Potomac Radio, Inc., in 2005. Local programming ended in 2007.

=== Increase in power ===
On October 29, 2008, WAGE received a permit from the Federal Communications Commission (FCC) to move to 1190 kHz and increase its power to 50,000 watts. Potomac Radio purchased and shut down WBIS, which operated on the same frequency in Annapolis, Maryland, to enable the power increase.

On August 2, 2009, WAGE fell silent due to "tough economic conditions" and an ongoing attempt to move the station to AM 1190 and up the power to 50,000 watts. On April 21, 2010, the FCC approved WAGE's application to increase its daytime power to 50,000 watts and its nighttime power to 1,300 watts from different antenna sites, along with the frequency shift to 1190 kHz. The station was also forced to move out of Leesburg as the existing transmitter site was not large enough to accommodate the required towers.

=== China Radio International ===
The station returned to the air on April 11, 2011, with programming from China Radio International (CRI), the Chinese state broadcaster, and a designated foreign mission in the U.S. The call sign was switched to WCRW to reflect this programming. On November 2, 2015, it was reported that the FCC would investigate allegations of whether WCRW was controlled by CRI. At the same time, the United States Department of Justice announced an investigation to determine whether CRI was in compliance with legal obligations under the Foreign Agents Registration Act (FARA). Reuters reported that 60 percent of the station's airtime was leased by a subsidiary of CRI.

WCRW was granted 1,200 watts of nighttime power in 2017, upgrading from class D to class B in the process. The station received permission to begin test operations at night on May 4, 2018.

New World Radio Group sold WCRW to the unrelated Potomac Radio Group, Inc., partially owned by Marquee Broadcasting owners Brian and Patricia Lane, in September 2018. The sale was consummated on January 2, 2019, at a price of $750,000.

In January 2022, Potomac Radio Group dropped CRI and changed to a generic brokered programming format as "New World Radio". This followed an investigation by the Small Business Administration over the receipt of more than $100,000 through the Paycheck Protection Program (PPP). PPP loans were prohibited for entities subject to the Foreign Agents Registration Act, under which Potomac Radio registered in December 2021. Potomac Radio's required FARA disclosures revealed CRI and China Global Television Network had paid the company over $4 million between 2019 and 2021, to broadcast its programming.

=== Operation by iHeartMedia ===
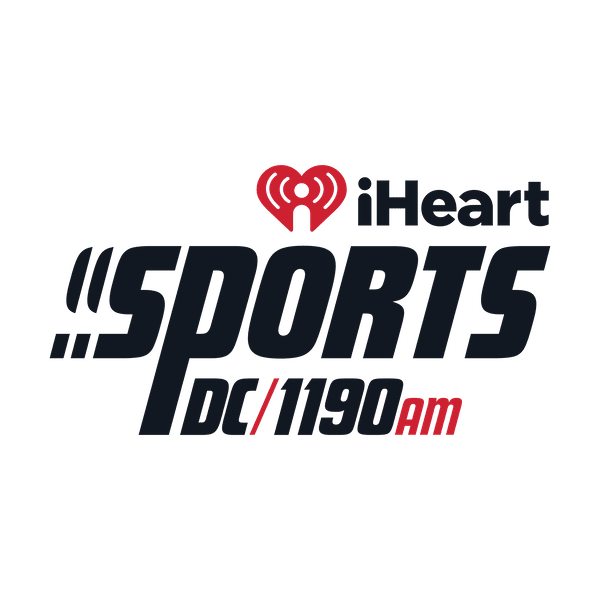
Logo as "iHeart Sports DC"

On December 30, 2022, WCRW announced that it would end its "New World Radio" brokered programming; under a three-year local marketing agreement, iHeartMedia began operating the station on January 4, 2023, concurrent with a call sign change to WTSD. Potomac Radio Group had previously sold WUST to iHeartMedia in 2020. iHeartMedia used WTSD to launch a sports format, branded as "iHeart Sports DC" and featuring programming from Fox Sports Radio and Vegas Stats & Information Network; this programming is also simulcast on the HD2 channel of WWDC, replacing talk radio station "WONK-FM".

The agreement expired on January 4, 2026, and iHeartMedia declined its option to purchase the station. Potomac Radio Group took the station silent as it was unable to find either a buyer or another lessee. The sports programming continues on WWDC-HD2.

Richard Wiles' Faith & Values Media Group purchased the station from Potomac Radio Group in April 2026 for $450,000. The call sign was changed to WNDC on September 24, 2026.
