= WBHB =

WBHB may refer to:

- WBHB (FM), a radio station (92.1 FM) licensed to serve Mercersburg, Pennsylvania, United States
- WBHB (AM), a defunct radio station (1240 AM) formerly licensed to serve Fitzgerald, Georgia, United States
- WAYZ, a radio station (101.5 FM) licensed to serve Waynesboro, Pennsylvania, United States, which held the call sign WBHB-FM from March 2009 to October 2025
- WTGD, a radio station (105.1 FM) licensed to serve Bridgewater, Virginia, United States, which held the call sign WBHB-FM from February 2005 to December 2008
