= WNTW =

WNTW may refer to:

== Radio stations ==
- WJFN (AM), a radio station (820 AM) licensed to serve Chester, Virginia, United States, which held the call sign WNTW from 2014 to 2020
- WGGI (AM), a radio station (990 AM) licensed to serve Somerset, Pennsylvania, United States, which held the callsign from 2004 to 2013
- WXVA, a radio station (610 AM) licensed to serve Winchester, Virginia, which held the callsign from 1993 to 2002

== Television show ==
- What Not to Wear, a television series
