= WZFC =

WZFC may refer to:

- WINC (AM), a radio station (1400 AM) licensed to serve Winchester, Virginia, United States, which held the call sign WZFC from 2021 to 2023
- WVRX, a radio station (104.9 FM) licensed to serve Strasburg, Virginia, which held the call sign WZFC from 2011 to 2021
