= WXBN =

WXBN may refer to:

- WXBN (AM), a radio station (880 AM) licensed to serve Sweetwater, Florida, United States
- WINC-FM, a radio station (105.5 FM) licensed to serve Berryville, Virginia, which held the call sign WXBN from 2011 to 2020
- WVRX, a radio station (104.9 FM) licensed to serve Strasburg, Virginia, which held the call sign WXBN from 2009 to 2011
- WOTX, a radio station (93.7 FM) licensed to serve Lunenburg, Vermont, United States, which held the call sign WXBN in 2007
