= WGRQ =

- Fairview Beach, Virginia; United States
- Broadcast area: Fredericksburg, Virginia; Spotsylvania Courthouse, Virginia; Bowling Green, Virginia
- Frequency: 95.9 MHz
- Branding: 95.9 The Goat

Programming
- Format: Classic hits
- Affiliations: Washington Commanders Radio Network; Virginia Sports Radio Network

Ownership
- Owner: Centennial Broadcasting; (Centennial Licensing II, LLC)
- Sister stations: WFVA, WBQB, WGRX

History
- First air date: May 3, 1986
- Former call signs: WPOT (1985)

Technical information
- Licensing authority: FCC
- Facility ID: 64922
- Class: A
- ERP: 2,500 watts
- HAAT: 157.9 meters (518 ft)
- Transmitter coordinates: 38°16′21.0″N 77°29′46.0″W

Links
- Public license information: Public file; LMS
- Webcast: Listen live
- Website: www.959thegoat.com

WGRQ (95.9 FM) is a classic hits formatted broadcast radio station licensed to Fairview Beach, Virginia, serving Fredericksburg, Spotsylvania Courthouse, and Bowling Green in Virginia. WGRQ is owned and operated by Centennial Licensing II, LLC.

== Programming ==
WGRQ broadcasts a classic hits music format to the Fredericksburg, Virginia, area. As of April 2021, weekday on-air personalities include Dave Adler on morning drive, Paula Kidwell on mid-days, Brad Majors on afternoons, Throwback Nation Radio with Tony Lorino in the evenings and Casey Kasem's American Top 40 on Sunday evenings. Each year, around Thanksgiving, WGRQ flips to all-Christmas music programming and becomes "The Christmas Station." This format flip completed its 15th year in 2020.

In addition to its music programming, WGRQ also broadcasts Washington Commanders games as a member of the Washington Commanders Broadcast Network.

== History ==
=== Launch ===
After an application was filed in March 1983, the original construction permit for this station was granted by the FCC on December 7, 1984. This would be a new station broadcasting on 95.9 MHz with 3,000 watts of effective radiated power from an antenna 91.3 meters (300 ft) in height above average terrain. The new station's city of license was to be Colonial Beach, Virginia. The still-under construction station was assigned call sign WPOT on February 25, 1985.

In November 1985, original permit holder Colonial Beach Broadcasting, Inc., applied to the FCC to transfer the permit to Potomac Broadcasting, Inc. The call sign was changed to WGRQ on December 1, 1985, and has remained stable for more than 25 years. The sale to Potomac Broadcasting was finalized in March 1986.

=== Telemedia era ===
WGRQ began broadcasting under program test authority on May 3, 1986, with an adult contemporary music format. The station received its broadcast license from the FCC on November 16, 1987. Just days later, Potomac Broadcasting applied to the FCC to transfer the license to Telemedia Broadcasting, Inc. The FCC approved the transfer on January 4, 1988, and the transaction was consummated on January 20, 1988.

Previously known as "Virginia's Rockin' Oldies 95.9", the station flipped formats from oldies to classic hits on January 17, 2005. WGRQ had broadcast Virginia Tech Hokies football games as a longtime member of the Virginia Tech Sports Network before transitioning to Virginia Cavaliers football broadcasts in September 2009.

=== Centennial Broadcasting era (2025–present) ===
On August 13, 2025, Centennial Broadcasting II, LLC announced it would acquire WGRQ and its sister station WGRX from Telemedia Broadcasting, Inc. for $2.3 million. The acquisition expanded Centennial's Fredericksburg cluster to four stations, joining WBQB and WFVA. The Federal Communications Commission (FCC) approved the license transfer in late 2025, and the sale was officially consummated at midnight on March 1, 2026. Following the closure, Telemedia General Manager Tom Cooper retired, and Mark Bass assumed oversight of the expanded four-station cluster. While the stations initially continued operating from their Lafayette Boulevard studios, Centennial announced plans to eventually consolidate all operations at its facility on Mimosa Street in south Stafford.

On May 14, 2026, WGRQ rebranded as "95.9 The Goat".

=== Studio controversy / facilities changes ===
The station was involved in controversy when a rival broadcasting company complained to the FCC in July 2001 that WGRQ's main studios were located too far from the station's city of license, a violation of FCC regulations which required the distance be 25 miles (40 km) or less. WGRQ acknowledged that its studios were 28.8 miles (46.3 km) from the center of Colonial Beach, Virginia, but successfully asserted that it was in compliance with the law because "unique terrain" kept the studio location within the station's "principal community contour".

In August 2005, Telemedia Broadcasting applied for a "main studio waiver" which would have allowed them to relocate their broadcast studios even farther from the center of Colonial Beach. The new site, 2.5 miles (4.0 km) farther from the city center, would have allowed the station to eliminate a 100-foot tower built for the studio-transmitter link, a point of contention with the Spotsylvania County Planning Commission. The FCC denied this application on September 20, 2005.

In January 2010, Telemedia Broadcasting applied to the FCC to change WGRQ's city of license from Colonial Beach to Fairview Beach, Virginia. Fairview Beach is a census-designated place in King George County, Virginia, roughly 15 miles (24 km) WNW of Colonial Beach and significantly closer to the primary market of Fredericksburg. The FCC authorized the change on April 27, 2010. On April 2, 2013, WGRQ received approval to begin transmitting from a tower located off U.S. Route 1 just south of Fredericksburg.
