= WKDV =

WKDV may refer to:

- WKDV (AM), a radio station (1460 AM) licensed to serve Manassas, Virginia, United States
- WVRX, a radio station (104.9 FM) licensed to serve Strasburg, Virginia, which held the call sign WKDV-FM from 2021 to 2022
