= B101 =

B101 may refer to:

== Radio stations branded "B101" ==
- CIQB-FM, 101.1 MHz in Barrie, Ontario
- WBQB, 101.5 MHz in Fredericksburg, Virginia
- WWBB, 101.5 MHz in Providence, Rhode Island
- WBEB, 101.1 MHz in Philadelphia, Pennsylvania

== Other ==
- B101 road (Great Britain)
- Blackburn B-101 Beverley (1950), a transport airplane
