= WXVA =

Radio station in Winchester, Virginia

- Winchester, Virginia; United States
- Broadcast area: Winchester metropolitan area
- Frequency: 610 kHz
- Branding: 102.9 Valley FM

Programming
- Language: English
- Format: Classic hits
- Affiliations: CBS News Radio

Ownership
- Owner: Edward A. Schober; (Winchester Radio Broadcasters, LLC)

History
- First air date: January 27, 1961
- Former call signs: WHPL (1961–1982); WVAI (1982–1986); WUSQ (1986–1993); WNTW (1993–2002); WTFX (2002–2009); WLVE (2009–2011)

Technical information
- Licensing authority: FCC
- Facility ID: 4668
- Class: B
- Power: 380 watts (day); 125 watts (night STA)
- Transmitter coordinates: 39°7′26.0″N 78°12′44.0″W
- Translators: 102.9 W275BV (Winchester); 92.1 W221EQ (Front Royal)

Links
- Public license information: Public file; LMS

WXVA (610 kHz) – branded as 102.9 Valley FM – is a classic hits formatted broadcast commercial AM radio station licensed to Winchester, Virginia, serving the Winchester metropolitan area. WXVA is owned and operated by Winchester Radio Broadcasters, LLC.

== History ==
Edwin Fisher's Shenval Broadcasting Corporation signed on WHPL on January 27, 1961. The station was programmed with a mix of top-40 and modern country music music to compete directly against the adult contemporary music of WINC (1400 AM). WHPL joined NBC on December 1, 1964.

In 1966, Shenval signed on a companion FM station, WHPL-FM on 102.5. Unlike most co-owned AM-FM pairings of the time, this station was programmed independently from the start, and is now country WUSQ-FM.

Arthur H. Holt purchased the two stations from Shenval in 1982. was flipped to adult standards under the callsign WVAI. In 1986, it went back to adult contemporary as WUSQ before switching again to a country simulcast of WUSQ-FM in 1990. Benchmark Communications purchased the two stations in 1991, and left the simulcast intact. Three years later, the AM side changed to news-talk-sports WNTW with newscasts from CNN Radio.

Benchmark sold all of its holdings to Capstar Broadcasting, then the largest station owner in the country, in 1997. Capstar then merged with Chancellor Media to form AMFM, Inc. in 1999. The new ownership brought a contemporary Christian music format on December 26, 1999. Clear Channel Communications bought AMFM in 2002, and instituted the new callsign WTFX and an all-sports radio format anchored by talk programming from Fox Sports Radio.

In November 2008, Clear Channel sold the land on which the station's towers stood, leaving it without a transmitter site. Accordingly, WTFX went off the air on November 17, and its transmitter was physically dismantled. The sports talk programming was immediately moved to WMRE (1550 AM), where it remains today.

Clear Channel opted not to return the license while it sought a new transmitter site. The callsign WLVE (long associated with what is now WMIA-FM Miami) was "parked" on the license beginning in April 2009, in order not to lose control of the sign to another station operator. Low-powered transmissions resumed for a few days each November – by way of a wire strung up at WUSQ-FM's site – as the Telecommunications Act mandates automatic deletion of a station that is continuously silent for one year. WLVE was later one of several moribund AM stations that made up a planned 2009 donation to the Washington, D.C. nonprofit Minority Media and Telecommunications Council; however, for unclear reasons, it is absent from later reports on the plan and never changed hands.

Clear Channel eventually sold the license in 2011, to Ted Schober's Winchester Radio Broadcasters for $5,000. By this time, the license was the only asset. The sale included no studio, transmitter site, or any "significant equipment", according to Schober.

Winchester Radio rebuilt and launched in June 2011, a locally-oriented full service station with news, talk and eclectic variety music programming that ranged from the 1950s to the present. With the new ownership came the callsign WXVA, which had previously seen longtime use on 98.3 FM and 1550 AM in neighboring Charles Town. The music was tweaked to classic hits, focusing on pop hits from the 1960s through 1980s, in February 2014.

Winchester Radio purchased translator W275BV on November 5, 2014, from Starboard Media Foundation for $11,000. The translator simulcasts WXVA on 102.9 FM, with a signal covering Frederick County. The translator began broadcasting on May 4, 2015.

Emphasizing the identity of its translator, WXVA relaunched as "102.9 Valley FM" without any change to its music on March 27, 2017.

== Technical ==
=== Nighttime operation ===
WXVA is licensed for 380 watts non-directional during the day from a site due south of Winchester near Kernstown, Virginia. The station is also licensed for 500 watts directional at night, tightly oriented northwest-southeast to protect WTEL in Philadelphia, WTVN in Columbus, Ohio, and WPLY in Roanoke. This means a different transmitter site is required for night operation, as running the licensed night signal from the same location would not cover Winchester as required. Since relaunching, Winchester Radio has not been able to find an adequate nighttime site. WXVA has operated nights under a succession of special temporary authorities at 125 watts non-directional from its daytime site.

=== Translators ===
| Call sign | Frequency | City of license | FID | ERP (W) | HAAT | Class | Transmitter coordinates | FCC info |
|---|---|---|---|---|---|---|---|---|
| W221EQ | 92.1 FM | Front Royal, Virginia | 202519 | 250 | 666 m (2,185 ft) | D | 38°57′36″N 78°19′51″W | LMS |
| W275BV | 102.9 FM | Winchester, Virginia | 144808 | 250 | 381 m (1,250 ft) | D | 39°11′02″N 78°23′14″W | LMS |
