= WTFX =

WTFX may refer to:

- WTFX-FM, a radio station (93.1 FM) licensed to Clarksville, Indiana, United States
- WXVA, a radio station (610 AM) licensed to Winchester, Virginia, United States, which held the call sign WTFX from April 2002 to April 2009
