= WELD (AM) =

- Fisher, West Virginia; United States
- Broadcast area: Potomac Highlands of West Virginia
- Frequency: 690 kHz
- Branding: WELD AM 690

Programming
- Language: English
- Format: Classic hits
- Affiliations: West Virginia MetroNews; Westwood One

Ownership
- Owner: Save Our Station Inc.
- Sister stations: WELD-FM; WQWV

History
- First air date: 1956

Technical information
- Licensing authority: FCC
- Facility ID: 60923
- Class: D
- Power: 3,000 watts daytime; 500 watts critical hours; 14 watts nighttime
- Transmitter coordinates: 39°3′8.4″N 79°0′20.1″W

Links
- Public license information: Public file; LMS
- Webcast: Listen live

WELD (690 kHz) is a commercial classic hits formatted broadcast AM radio station licensed to Fisher, West Virginia, serving the Potomac Highlands of West Virginia. WELD is owned and operated by Save Our Station Inc.

By day, WELD is powered at 3,000 watts, using a non-directional antenna. But because 690 AM is a Canadian and Mexican clear channel frequency reserved for Class A stations CKGM in Montreal and XEWW in Rosarito, WELD reduces power during critical hours, and reduces power at night to 14 watts.

== History ==
By the 1950s, Richard Field Lewis Jr. (1907–1957) had added WELD (AM) to the Richard Field Lewis Jr. Stations (later Mid Atlantic Network Inc.).
