= WQWV =

Radio station in Fisher, West Virginia

- Fisher, West Virginia; United States
- Broadcast area: Petersburg; Moorefield
- Frequency: 103.7 MHz
- Branding: 103.7 The Quest

Programming
- Format: Adult hits

Ownership
- Owner: Save Our Station, LLC
- Sister stations: WELD, WELD-FM

History
- First air date: July 1998
- Former call signs: WAAE (1995–1995); WJBQ (1995–1996)
- Call sign meaning: West Virginia

Technical information
- Licensing authority: FCC
- Facility ID: 30171
- Class: A
- ERP: 310 watts
- HAAT: 422 meters (1,385 ft)
- Transmitter coordinates: 39°2′16.0″N 79°5′23.0″W

Links
- Public license information: Public file; LMS

WQWV is an adult hits formatted broadcast radio station licensed to Fisher, West Virginia, serving Petersburg and Moorefield in West Virginia. WQWV is owned and operated by Thunder Associates, LLC.
