= WKSI-FM =

- Stephens City, Virginia; United States
- Broadcast area: Northern Shenandoah Valley; Eastern Panhandle of West Virginia
- Frequency: 98.3 MHz (HD Radio)
- Branding: FM/HD1: Kiss 98-3; HD2: Classic Country 95-7

Programming
- Language: English
- Format: Contemporary hit radio
- Subchannels: HD2: Classic Country 95-7 (classic country)
- Affiliations: iHeartRadio; Premiere Networks

Ownership
- Owner: iHeartMedia; (iHM Licenses, LLC)
- Sister stations: W239BV; WFQX; WMRE; WUSQ-FM

History
- First air date: August 28, 1967
- Former call signs: WZFM (1967–1982); WXVA-FM (1982–2003)
- Call sign meaning: play on the word "Kiss"

Technical information
- Licensing authority: FCC
- Facility ID: 26998
- Class: A
- ERP: 1,750 watts
- HAAT: 188 meters (617 ft)
- Transmitter coordinates: 39°10′38.0″N 78°15′53.0″W
- Translator: HD2: 95.7 W239BV (Winchester)

Links
- Public license information: Public file; LMS
- Webcast: FM/HD1: Listen live (via iHeartRadio); HD2: Listen live (via iHeartRadio)
- Website: FM/HD1: kiss983.iheart.com HD2: classiccountry957.iheart.com

WKSI-FM (98.3 MHz, "Kiss 98-3") is a contemporary hit radio formatted broadcast commercial FM radio station licensed to Stephens City, Virginia, serving the Northern Shenandoah Valley of Virginia and the Eastern Panhandle of West Virginia. WKSI-FM is owned and operated by iHeartMedia

== History ==
The station signed on August 28, 1967, as WZFM, a local station serving Charles Town, West Virginia. The station was co-owned with WXVA (1550 AM) by Arthur W. Arundel, who at the time owned WAVA in Arlington and the Leesburg-based Loudoun Times-Mirror newspaper. WZFM simulcast WXVA's broadcasting day, which was Full Service with blocks of country music.

The two stations were sold in 1970, to electrical engineer John P. Luce. The simulcast split around this time as the AM side was switched to Top 40 and the FM station went to full-time country.

Luce sold to Heritage Broadcasting Corporation in September 1982. Heritage changed the callsign to WXVA-FM after taking control. After an initial return to simulcasting 1550 AM (which had flipped to middle-of-the-road) immediately after the change, the station settled on light adult contemporary around 1986.

In September 1993, another format change took place, this time to oldies. Unusually for an FM station, Broadcasting Yearbook reported that it operated 19 hours a day – signing off between midnight and 5 a.m. A flip back to country as "Xtra Country 98" took place in January 1996. The station remained in Charles Town, but was a rimshot to Winchester, regularly showing up in the ratings there despite competition from local country stalwart WUSQ-FM.

Clear Channel (now iHeartMedia) bought WXVA-FM from Heritage in 2000. As it already owned WUSQ-FM, it sought to tap the larger Winchester market with a different format instead of competing with itself. On December 10, 2003, Clear Channel applied to move the transmitter to WUSQ-FM's site near Round Hill, Frederick County, Virginia, changing the city of license from Charles Town to Stephens City. The station immediately began stunting as "Christmas 98.3" with Christmas music and spots advising listeners to tune to WUSQ-FM for country. The flip to CHR as "Kiss 98-3". WKSI-FM came on December 26, although the physical move was not completed until late 2004.

== HD2 subchannel ==
On May 24, 2013, former owner Liberty University began the process of moving the station's transmitting tower, which hadn't been built at this point, to the same tower as Clear Channel station WKSI-FM. At the time, the station was licensed as W242BG and was to broadcast on 96.3 FM.

On August 2, 2013, Liberty University filed an application and an Asset Purchase Agreement with the Federal Communications Commission (FCC) to begin the sale of W242BG to Clear Channel. W242BG was sold for $5,000.00 in exchange for Liberty's use of "the HD3 channel of Station WUSQ-FM" for a "period of eight years from [the date of the] execution" of the sale. Liberty would also be given the right to lease tower space on the WUSQ tower at no charge.

On August 22, 2013, Clear Channel filed an application moving the station from 96.3 FM to 95.7 FM. The callsign was changed on the same date.

W239BV launched on August 22, 2013, and began airing a hot adult contemporary format, simulcasting the HD2 subchannel of WKSI-FM. WKSI-HD2, and in turn W239BV, aired the "Today's Mix" format, one of Clear Channel's Premium Choice formats.

On November 1, 2013, W239BV switched its format from hot adult contemporary to a seasonal all-Christmas music format, with the "Mix 95-7" branding remaining. The station switched back to hot adult contemporary on December 26.

On December 26, 2020, at 12 Midnight, W239BV took over the classic country format, which had been abandoned by crosstown competitor WXBN ahead of sister-station WINC-FM's sale and format change, as "Classic Country 95-7".
