= WFYN =

WFYN may refer to:

- WFYN-LP, a low-power radio station (93.3 FM) licensed to serve Birmingham, Alabama, United States
- WBHB-FM, a radio station (101.5 FM) licensed to serve Waynesboro, Pennsylvania, United States, which held the call sign WFYN from 2005 to 2009
