= WGRX =

- Falmouth, Virginia; United States
- Broadcast area: Fredericksburg, Virginia; Spotsylvania Courthouse, Virginia
- Frequency: 104.5 MHz
- Branding: Thunder 104.5

Programming
- Format: Country

Ownership
- Owner: Centennial Broadcasting; (Centennial Licensing II, LLC)
- Sister stations: WFVA, WGRQ, WBQB

History
- First air date: May 17, 2001
- Former call signs: WFAL-FM (1998–2001)

Technical information
- Licensing authority: FCC
- Facility ID: 62205
- Class: A
- ERP: 2,700 watts
- HAAT: 150 meters (490 ft)
- Transmitter coordinates: 38°16′31.0″N 77°32′34.0″W

Links
- Public license information: Public file; LMS
- Webcast: Listen live
- Website: thunder1045.com

WGRX (104.5 FM) is a Country formatted broadcast radio station licensed to Falmouth, Virginia, serving Fredericksburg and Spotsylvania Courthouse in Virginia. WGRX is owned and operated by Centennial Licensing II, LLC.

Previous logo
