= WFQX =

WFQX may refer to:

- WFQX-TV, a television station (channel 32 digital) licensed to Cadillac, Michigan, United States
- WFQX (FM), a radio station (99.3 FM) licensed to Front Royal, Virginia, United States
