= WELD-FM =

- Moorefield, West Virginia; United States
- Broadcast area: Potomac Highlands of West Virginia
- Frequency: 101.7 MHz
- Branding: WELD Country 101.7 (pronounced "weld")

Programming
- Format: Country
- Affiliations: ABC News Radio; West Virginia MetroNews

Ownership
- Owner: Save Our Station, LLC
- Sister stations: WELD, WQWV

History
- First air date: February 6, 1987

Technical information
- Licensing authority: FCC
- Facility ID: 60922
- Class: A
- ERP: 285 watts
- HAAT: 455 meters (1,493 ft)
- Transmitter coordinates: 38°58′58.0″N 78°54′30.0″W

Links
- Public license information: Public file; LMS
- Webcast: Listen live
- Website: www.saveourstationradio.com

WELD-FM is a country music–formatted radio station licensed to Moorefield, West Virginia, serving the Potomac Highlands of West Virginia. WELD-FM is owned and operated by Thunder Associates, LLC.

== Translator ==
In addition to the main station, WELD-FM is relayed by an FM translator to widen its broadcast area.

Call sign	Frequency	City of license	FID	ERP (W)	HAAT	Class	FCC info
W274AU	102.7 FM	Franklin, West Virginia	142232	8 watts	−76.3 m (−250 ft)	D	LMS
