= List of Washington Commanders broadcasters =

The Washington Commanders are a professional American football franchise based in the Washington metropolitan area. They are members of the East division in the National Football Conference (NFC) of the National Football League (NFL). The Commanders were founded in 1932 as the Boston Braves, named after the local baseball franchise. The franchise changed its name the following year to the Redskins and moved to Washington, D.C. in 1937. In 2020, the team retired the Redskins name after longstanding controversies surrounding it and briefly played as the Washington Football Team before becoming the Commanders in 2022.

The team's flagship station is WBIG-FM (Big 100.3), having been selected as the team's broadcast partner after following a partnership with iHeartMedia in 2022. The team's previous longtime broadcast home was previously WTEM, by virtue of previously being owned by Red Zebra Broadcasting through former team owner Daniel Snyder.

List of team broadcasters
Year	Play-by-play	Analyst(s)
1937	Tony Wakeman	
1938	Tony Wakeman	
1939	Tony Wakeman	
1940	Tony Wakeman	
1941	Harry Wismer	
1942	Harry Wismer	
1943	Harry Wismer	Jim Gibbons
1944	Harry Wismer	Jim Gibbons
1945	Harry Wismer	Jim Gibbons
1946	Harry Wismer	Jim Gibbons
1947	Harry Wismer	Jim Gibbons
1948	Harry Wismer	Jim Gibbons
1949	Harry Wismer	Jim Gibbons
1950	Harry Wismer	Jim Gibbons
1951	Harry Wismer	Jim Gibbons
1952	Mel Allen	Jim Gibbons
1953	Mel Allen and Jim Gibbons	Jim Gibbons and Bill Malone
1954	Jim Gibbons	Bill Malone
1955	Eddie Gallaher	Charlie Justice
1956	Eddie Gallaher	Arch McDonald
1957	Eddie Gallaher	Arch McDonald
1958	Dan Daniels	Arch McDonald
1959	Dan Daniels	Arch McDonald
1960	Dan Daniels	Arch McDonald
1961	Bill McColgan	Morrie Siegel
1962	Bill McColgan	Morrie Siegel
1963	Bill McColgan	Morrie Siegel
1964	Steve Gilmartin	Chuck Drazenovich
1965	Steve Gilmartin	Chuck Drazenovich
1966	Steve Gilmartin	Chuck Drazenovich
1967	Steve Gilmartin	Chuck Drazenovich
1968	Steve Gilmartin	Mal Campbell
1969	Steve Gilmartin	Mal Campbell
1970	Steve Gilmartin	Mal Campbell
1971	Steve Gilmartin	Mal Campbell
1972	Steve Gilmartin	Mal Campbell
1973	Steve Gilmartin	Mal Campbell
1974	Mal Campbell	Len Hathaway
1975	Len Hathaway	Sam Huff
1976	Len Hathaway	Sam Huff
1977	Dan Lovett	Sam Huff
1978	Dan Lovett	Sam Huff
1979	Frank Herzog	Sam Huff
1980	Frank Herzog	Sam Huff
1981	Frank Herzog	Sonny Jurgensen and Sam Huff
1982	Frank Herzog	Sonny Jurgensen and Sam Huff
1983	Frank Herzog	Sonny Jurgensen and Sam Huff
1984	Frank Herzog	Sonny Jurgensen and Sam Huff
1985	Frank Herzog	Sonny Jurgensen and Sam Huff
1986	Frank Herzog	Sonny Jurgensen and Sam Huff
1987	Frank Herzog	Sonny Jurgensen and Sam Huff
1988	Frank Herzog	Sonny Jurgensen and Sam Huff
1989	Frank Herzog	Sonny Jurgensen and Sam Huff
1990	Frank Herzog	Sonny Jurgensen and Sam Huff
1991	Frank Herzog	Sonny Jurgensen and Sam Huff
1992	Frank Herzog	Sonny Jurgensen and Sam Huff
1993	Frank Herzog	Sonny Jurgensen and Sam Huff
1994	Frank Herzog	Sonny Jurgensen and Sam Huff
1995	Frank Herzog	Sonny Jurgensen and Sam Huff
1996	Frank Herzog	Sonny Jurgensen and Sam Huff
1997	Frank Herzog	Sonny Jurgensen and Sam Huff
1998	Frank Herzog	Sonny Jurgensen and Sam Huff
1999	Frank Herzog	Sonny Jurgensen and Sam Huff
2000	Frank Herzog	Sonny Jurgensen and Sam Huff
2001	Frank Herzog	Sonny Jurgensen and Sam Huff
2002	Frank Herzog	Sonny Jurgensen and Sam Huff
2003	Frank Herzog	Sonny Jurgensen and Sam Huff
2004	Frank Herzog	Sonny Jurgensen and Sam Huff
2005	Larry Michael	Sonny Jurgensen and Sam Huff
2006	Larry Michael	Sonny Jurgensen and Sam Huff
2007	Larry Michael	Sonny Jurgensen and Sam Huff
2008	Larry Michael	Sonny Jurgensen and Sam Huff
2009	Larry Michael	Sonny Jurgensen and Sam Huff
2010	Larry Michael	Sonny Jurgensen and Sam Huff
2011	Larry Michael	Sonny Jurgensen and Sam Huff
2012	Larry Michael	Sonny Jurgensen and Sam Huff
2013	Larry Michael	Chris Cooley and Sonny Jurgensen
2014	Larry Michael	Chris Cooley and Sonny Jurgensen
2015	Larry Michael	Chris Cooley and Sonny Jurgensen
2016	Larry Michael	Chris Cooley and Sonny Jurgensen
2017	Larry Michael	Chris Cooley and Sonny Jurgensen
2018	Larry Michael	Chris Cooley and Sonny Jurgensen
2019	Larry Michael	Chris Cooley
2020	Bram Weinstein	DeAngelo Hall and Julie Donaldson
2021	Bram Weinstein	DeAngelo Hall and Julie Donaldson
2022	Bram Weinstein	London Fletcher and Julie Donaldson
2023	Bram Weinstein	London Fletcher and Julie Donaldson
2024	Bram Weinstein	London Fletcher and Logan Paulsen
2025	Bram Weinstein	London Fletcher and Logan Paulsen
2026		London Fletcher and Logan Paulsen
