= Myra MacPherson =

American author, biographer and journalist (1934–2026)

- Born: Myra Lea MacPherson; May 31, 1934; Marquette, Michigan, U.S.
- Died: February 2, 2026 (aged 91); Washington, D.C., U.S.
- Education: Michigan State University
- Occupations: Journalist; writer; lecturer
- Board member of: Hospice Foundation of America
- Spouses: Morris Siegel (m. 1964; div. 1985); Jack Gordon (m. 1987; died 2005)
- Children: 2
- Website: www.myramacpherson.com

Myra Lea MacPherson (May 31, 1934 – February 2, 2026) was an American author, biographer and journalist known for writing about politics, the Vietnam War, feminism and death and dying. Although her work has appeared in many publications, she had a long affiliation with The Washington Post newspaper. She was hired in 1968 by Post executive editor Ben Bradlee to write for the paper's Style section, and remained with the Post for over two decades until 1991. She continued writing after leaving the Post, winning a number of awards. She died in 2026.

== Life and career ==
The granddaughter of a coal miner, MacPherson was born in Marquette, Michigan, and raised in Belleville, Michigan. Her father worked for Argus, and her mother was a homemaker. She graduated from Michigan State University in 1956 with a degree in journalism.

A few years after graduating from college, she interviewed President John F. Kennedy. She credits her editors, Sid Epstein at The Washington Star and later Ben Bradlee at The Washington Post, the latter of whom hired her in 1968, for ignoring a long-established bias against women covering politics, sports and major news during the sixties. However, the Star refused to send her to the South to cover the Civil rights movement because it was "too dangerous for a 'girl'".

Employment discrimination against women affected her early career. After writing for State News, the student daily of Michigan State University, she sought a job at the Detroit Free Press. The executive editor said he was sorry "but we have no openings in the women's section". MacPherson replied: "I wasn't applying for the women's section." Looking aghast, he said "we have NO women in the city room." MacPherson took a job running copy to the printers from the editorial writers, working her way up to by-lined articles that led to a job at the Detroit News, where she was assigned to the 1960 Indy 500. She was the only woman in the country covering it. She could not interview the racers in gasoline alley and was banned from the sports box. A male colleague quipped: "How much does your editor hate you?"

While with the Post, she profiled those involved in Watergate, covered five presidential campaigns, women's rights issues and wrote a series on Vietnam veterans that led to her 1984 book Long Time Passing: Vietnam and the Haunted Generation. It was the first trade book to examine post-traumatic stress disorder (PTSD) and, according to Vietnam expert Arnold R. Isaacs, was "among the first to break the long national silence about the war [and] remains one of the most moving and important works on the Vietnam bookshelf". The author Joseph Heller wrote: "MacPherson's book belongs with the best of the works on Vietnam".

MacPherson's first book, The Power Lovers: An Intimate Look at Politicians and Their Marriages was an instant best seller when published by Doubleday in 1975. She Came to Live Out Loud: An Inspiring Family Journey through Illness, Loss and Grief was published in 1999 and won health care hospice awards. MacPherson's 2014 book, The Scarlet Sisters: Sex, Suffrage and Scandal in the Gilded Age focused on Victorian hypocrisy on sex and women through the true story of two feminist sisters in the 1870s and fought for rights still denied women.

MacPherson interviewed such disparate women as Helen Keller, Nicaraguan president Violeta Chamorro, and the mother of the serial killer Ted Bundy. She wrote about murderers and slain Civil Rights leader Medgar Evers, covered the State funeral of President Kennedy, Presidential campaigns and specialized in in-depth profiles of politicians, including a martini-drinking Fidel Castro. However, even in 1969 she was banned from the sports box while the Miracle Mets won their smashing victory. When she wrote about the banning, and another women reporter sued, Pulitzer Prize winning New York Times sports columnist, Red Smith, wrote that it was about time such silly rules ended, thus paving the way for the many women active in sports media, including MacPherson's daughter, Leah Siegel, who became a three-time Emmy award-winning ESPN producer. She had practically grown up in the sports box with her sports writer father, Morrie Siegel. Decades before, he had introduced his wife to a host of sports characters and hangers on, including New York restaurateur Toots Shor who told MacPherson at an all-male-except-her dinner, "We're not interested in what you think, you're only here because of Morrie… As far as I am concerned all broads are a piece of raisin cake." The weird phrase meant nothing to her but it was enough to tell Toots off and to exit the restaurant.

Her 2006 biography of I. F. Stone, All Governments Lie! The Life and Times of Rebel Journalist I. F. Stone, won the 2007 Ann M. Sperber Award for media biography, and was a finalist for a 2008 PEN Center USA literary award; it was also named a best book and best biography of the year by the Boston Globe, Rocky Mountain News and BookList.com.

MacPherson wrote for The New York Times, numerous national magazines, and for blogs such as Salon, The Huffington Post and the Nieman Watchdog blog on journalism. She was on the advisory board of the Harvard Nieman I.F. Stone Award. She continued her interest in helping young journalists through the I. F. Stone Award project and the Molly Award, given annually in remembrance of Molly Ivins.

While doing book research MacPherson was a fellow at Rutgers University, a Ford Foundation fellow in Bellagio, Italy, and a recipient of a Fulbright Grant to study in Japan.

In 2016, All Governments Lie: Truth Deception and the Spirit of I. F. Stone, a 2016 documentary featuring today's best investigative reporters was based in part on her Stone book. The documentary premiered at the Toronto International Film Festival; Oliver Stone was the executive producer and journalist Fred Peabody directed the film.

== Personal life ==
MacPherson was married twice; her first marriage to Washington sportswriter Morris Siegel ended in divorce. She met her second husband, liberal Florida State Senator, Jack Gordon, when she covered the ultimately rejected Equal Rights Amendment for The Washington Post in 1977. MacPherson and Gordon would remain married until Gordon's death in 2005. MacPherson had two children, Leah, and Mike. Leah Siegel, who became a reporter for ESPN, died from breast cancer in July 2010.

MacPherson died in Washington, D.C., on February 2, 2026, from congestive heart failure.

== Bibliography ==
=== Selected periodicals ===
- MacPherson, Myra (May 8, 2009). "Review: Spies: the Rise and Fall of the KGB in America and "Three Tales of I.F Stone and the KGB: Kalugin, Venona and the Notebooks"". The Huffington Post.
- MacPherson, Myra (April 2000). "Bush Lite". Washington Monthly. Archived from the original on March 4, 2016. review of Shrub by Molly Ivins and Louis Dubose
- MacPherson, Myra (January 4, 1969). "Helen Hayes". St. Petersburg Times. Washington Post.

=== Sound ===
- MacPherson, Myra (2014). Myra MacPherson talks about her book, [The Scarlet Sisters], in which she argues that Victoria Woodhull and Tennessee Claflin changed the course of… Q&A Myra MacPherson, Mar 27 2014 C-SPAN.org [video] (Nonmusic video) (video). Washington, D.C.: C-SPAN.org.
- MacPherson, Myra (1979). Mothers and daughters [sound recording] (1 sound cassette (59 min.) : analog). Washington, D.C.: National Public Radio. LCCN 89740092. NT-790906.
- Conan, Neal; Stone, I.F.; MacPherson, Myra (September 5, 2006). "The Life and Work of I.F. Stone". Talk of the Nation. National Public Radio.

=== Books ===
- MacPherson, Myra (2014). The Scarlet Sisters : Sex, Suffrage, and Scandal in the Gilded Age (First ed.). New York, NY: Twelve. ISBN 9780446570237. LCCN 2013027618. on Victoria Woodhull and Tennessee Celeste Claflin
- MacPherson, Myra (2006). All Governments Lie : The Life and Times of Rebel Journalist I.F. Stone. New York: Scribner. ISBN 9780684807133. LCCN 2006042389.
- MacPherson, Myra (2001). Long Time Passing : Vietnam and the Haunted Generation. Bloomington: Indiana University Press. ISBN 0253340039. LCCN 2001039361.
- MacPherson, Myra (1999). She Came to Live Out Loud : An Inspiring Family Journey Through Illness, Loss, and Grief. New York: Scribners. ISBN 0684822644. LCCN 98028125.
- MacPherson, Myra (1994). Long Time Passing : Vietnam and the Haunted Generation. New York: Anchor Books. ISBN 0385470169. LCCN 93011992.
- MacPherson, Myra (1984). Long Time Passing : Vietnam and the Haunted Generation (1st ed.). Garden City, N.Y.: Doubleday. ISBN 0385158424. LCCN 82045258.
- MacPherson, Myra (1975). The Power Lovers : An Intimate Look at Politics and Marriage. New York: Putnam. ISBN 0399114955. LCCN 75018581. "The Power Lovers : An Intimate Look at Politics and Marriage."
