= Jack Diamond (radio personality) =

American photographer and radio personality

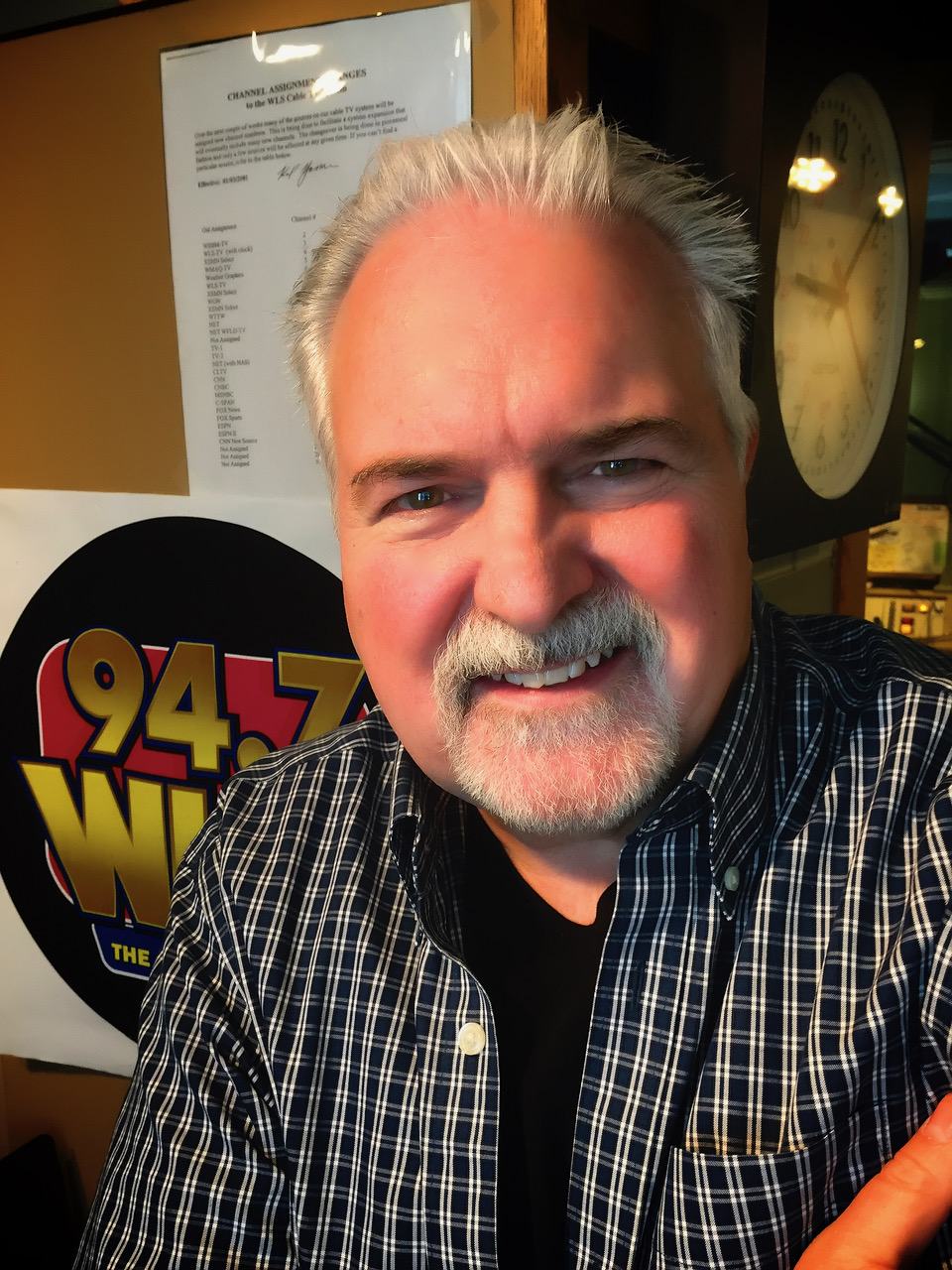
Jack Diamond - Radio Personality

Jack Diamond is a radio personality who hosted mornings at WRQX in Washington, D.C. for nearly 24 years and now does the same at WWEG, in Frederick County, Maryland.

== Early life ==
Diamond was born as Harvey Joel Fischer on April 21, 1954, and raised in Washington, D.C. He was adopted and has one sister who was also adopted. He is married to his third wife Lisa Anne, a singer/songwriter. He has five children, Rachel, Amy, Ian, Jenni, and Connor. He also has two dogs, Zeus and Steve. He lives just outside Washington, D.C., in Maryland.

== Radio career ==
Diamond began his full-time career in radio at the age of 16 while a junior in high school. His first full-time on-air job was at WINX, a Top-40 radio station in Rockville, Maryland, a suburb of Washington, D.C. He originally went by the name of Bruce Diamond on air at WINX. While at WINX, Jack did 7:00 pm–midnight, Monday–Friday during his junior year, and afternoons 3:00 pm–7:00 pm during his senior year. After working for a few years at WINX, he moved to WEEL in Fairfax, Virginia for another two-year run.

Some of the stations Diamond has worked at are WIGY, WABC, WLS, KNBR, KSON, WPRO and WPRO-FM, WQXI, WCBM, WRKO, and in particular, WRQX, where he hosted mornings for 24 years beginning in August 1990.

For most of his career, he has done a morning show. On April 27, 2013, Diamond was let go after that day's show due to the expiration of his contract. On September 29, 2013, Diamond announced that he would host mornings at WLYF in Miami, but he left that station in January 2014. On August 18, 2014, Diamond began co-hosting mornings with Kim Morrison at 1980s-based classic hits station XHPRS-FM in San Diego. On September 1, 2014, he announced on his Facebook page that he left XHPRS and was working on a new opportunity in the Washington area. He joined WLS-FM in November 2014 for morning drive, but left the station in July 2015, again working on a new opportunity in Washington. Diamond returned to WRQX in November, 2015.

== Jack Diamond Morning Show ==
Jack Diamond Morning Show, was a radio show that aired for 24 years on WRQX Mix 107.3 weekdays from 5 am to 10 am and Saturdays 6 am to 10 am in Washington, DC. The final broadcast of the show was on Friday, April 26, 2013. Other show members included Erica Hilary, Jimmy Alexander, and Bilingual Aly.

The current cast now includes Jimmy Alexander, Erica Hilary, Producer Blaire Kelleher and his wife, Lisa Anne.

With Educational Media Foundation's purchase of WRQX, on May 28, 2019, Diamond announced the station's format change and that he would host the final hour of WRQX. He also said he would return on another station.

As of September 2020, Diamond hosts the "Jack Diamond Show" on WWEG 106.9 FM The Eagle, based in Myersville, Maryland. The show is co-hosted with Jimmy Alexander weekdays from 6 a.m. to 10 a.m.

== Other interests ==
Diamond has also worked in television, both part and full-time, including co-hosting “Broadcast House Live” in Washington, on Channel 9. He is a panelist on "Idol Chatter" as part of the “American Idol” phenomenon on FOX 5. He also hosted a morning TV show in Jacksonville, Florida, and has done weather in San Antonio and San Diego.

Diamond worked in the music industry for Atlantic Records for a few years.

Diamond has a band (Jack Diamond - Jim Steed Band) that is a promotional arm of The Jack Diamond Morning Show, and Jack Diamond Enterprises Inc. He plays guitar and sings. His band plays happy hour shows at local clubs and events, and events like New Year's Eve and major festivals in the Mid-Atlantic area. Diamond and his band have opened for national touring acts for as many as 40,000 people. He is also a photographer.
