= WINC (AM) =

Radio station in Winchester, Virginia

- Winchester, Virginia; United States
- Broadcast area: Frederick County, Virginia; Clarke County, Virginia; Winchester, Virginia
- Frequency: 1400 kHz
- Branding: NewsTalk AM1400

Programming
- Format: News/Talk/Sports
- Affiliations: Baltimore Orioles; Christendom College; Fox News Radio; Premiere Networks; Salem Radio Network; Shenandoah Hornets; Virginia Cavaliers; Virginia Tech Hokies; Washington Wizards; WestStar TalkRadio Network; Westwood One

Ownership
- Owner: Todd Bartley; (Colonial Radio Group of Williamsport, LLC)

History
- First air date: June 26, 1941
- Former call signs: WINC (1941–2021); WZFC (2021–2023)
- Call sign meaning: "Winchester"

Technical information
- Licensing authority: Federal Communications Commission
- Facility ID: 41809
- Class: C
- Power: 1,000 watts (unlimited)
- Transmitter coordinates: 39°07′26.4″N 78°12′44.00″W

Links
- Public license information: Public file; LMS
- Webcast: Listen live; Listen live (via iHeartRadio)
- Website: talkwinchester.com

WINC (1400 AM) is a commercial broadcast radio station licensed to Winchester, Virginia, United States. The station carries a news/talk and sports radio format. Owned by Colonial Radio Group of Williamsport, LLC, WINC serves Frederick and Clarke counties and City of Winchester in Virginia. The station's studios are located in Winchester while the transmitter (shared with WXVA) resides south of the city in nearby Kernstown. In addition to a standard analog transmission, WINC is available online.

Originally known for 80 years under as WINC, the station was launched by Richard Field Lewis, Jr. on June 26, 1941, as Winchester's first radio station. The station remained in the hands of the Lewis family until its sale to North Carolina–based Centennial Broadcasting in 2007. The station's current format, established in 1996, consists mostly of conservative talk programs and top-of-the-hour news from Fox News Radio. Sports programming from the University of Virginia and Virginia Tech are also broadcast. Prior formats include middle of the road music, adult contemporary, and classic hits.

Several milestones have occurred during the station's 80 years of history. WINC was the station on which country music singer Patsy Cline made her debut in 1948, when Cline asked the leader of a "hillbilly band" for a chance to perform with them on air. In the late 1950s, the station's chief engineer, Philip Whitney, designed a CONELRAD alarm device for FM stations to warn listeners in the event of an enemy attack during the Cold War. Whitney also created many of the remote control systems used by radio stations. He was awarded for his work by the National Association of Broadcasters in 1970. WINC had difficulty renewing its license in the early 1970s, as it was airing 22 minutes of commercials per hour—in excess of what the Federal Communications Commission (FCC) permitted. The station encountered further trouble in 1988 when a local prosecutor called one of its promotions an "illegal cash lottery"; a judge disagreed. In that same year, the news department at WINC received an Associated Press Broadcasters Association national award for "Best Radio Spot News".

The late 2010s and early 2020s were marked by change spurred by the gradual divestment of Centennial's Winchester stations. WINC began simulcasting full-time over 104.9 FM (then WZFC) on January 31, 2018, but this ended in mid-November 2020 when Centennial sold the first WINC-FM, in operation since 1946, to Educational Media Foundation. Following a subsequent sale of a second WINC-FM on 105.5 MHz and WZFC to Metro Radio, WINC assumed the callsign WZFC on June 30, 2021, with Colonial Radio Group taking over operations via a local marketing agreement on July 1, and consummating the acquisition of the station on October 22, 2021. Colonial Radio owner Todd Bartley later became part of a local group that has since purchased WINC-FM. The station flipped back to its historical WINC call sign on February 25, 2023.

== History ==
=== Pre-broadcast and launch ===
The first words spoken on WINC

Good Morning. This is Winchester calling. Those of you listening this morning are witnessing the birth of a new voice in the world of radio broadcasting. This is Winchester, Virginia.

— Grant Pollock,

Richard Field Lewis, Jr. was a graduate of the College of Engineering at the University of California, Berkeley. He founded WFVA, a radio station in Fredericksburg, Virginia, in 1939. Before that, he had worked at KFXM in San Bernardino, California, as chief engineer. Lewis filed the initial application for a new station in Winchester, Virginia, with the Federal Communications Commission (FCC) on November 24, 1940. The application specified a transmitting frequency of 1370 AM, with a power of 250 watts, the maximum permitted for stations operating on "local" frequencies at the time. This application was approved and a construction permit (CP) issued on February 4, 1941. However, the pending implementation of the North American Regional Broadcasting Agreement (NARBA) mandated that on March 29, 1941, most stations on 1370 AM would move to 1400 AM, so the authorization specified this adjusted frequency.

In early March 1941, the FCC assigned the station the call sign WINC, derived from the first four letters in Winchester. At 6:57 am on June 26, 1941, WINC began broadcasting as Winchester's first radio station. Two weeks later, on July 13, Virginia Senator Harry F. Byrd and Governor James Hubert Price attended the dedication of the station. The first announcer on WINC was Grant Pollock, who had been hired as the station's commercial sales manager. Pollock came to Winchester from NBC Radio in Los Angeles. At the time of WINC's launch, Winchester had a population of 12,095, with only 2,968 radios. In June 1941, the station announced it would join the NBC Blue Network the following month.

Throughout the station's existence, WINC's studios have been located at 520 North Pleasant Valley Road in Winchester. The address at launch was 520 Kerr Street, later incorporated into Pleasant Valley Road.

=== History since launch ===
==== World War II ====
Less than six months after the station's first broadcast, WINC carried live descriptions of the attack on Pearl Harbor and President Roosevelt's "Infamy Speech" the following day. With the United States entry to World War II, WINC participated in the war effort on the air and at its studios. The City of Winchester erected an Aircraft Warning Service station, staffed by volunteers, beside the WINC facility. The station aired an hour-long special program called "Virginia Schools at War Mobilization" on February 22, 1943. The program involved approximately 618,000 schoolchildren and teachers from around the state, war-savings staff, and state and civic dignitaries. The special, broadcast live from Mount Vernon, was carried on 13 other Virginia stations and on WWDC in Washington, D.C. WINC participated in another wartime broadcast, this one in late January 1944, to encourage the public to buy War Bonds. A total of $150,525 in bonds were sold during the two-hour program, broadcast on 13 stations in Virginia and one in Washington, D.C.

On June 15, 1945, the NBC Blue Network formally changed its name to the American Broadcasting Company (ABC). WINC remained an affiliate of the renamed network. In the same year, C. Leslie Golliday was hired as the station's production manager. Golliday also built and launched two stations of his own: WEPM in Martinsburg, West Virginia, in 1946 and WCLG in Morgantown, West Virginia, in 1954.

==== Post World War II ====
WINC..... WINCHESTER, VA

250 watts
Owned by Richard Field Lewis
Radio station WINC started operations in 1941, and since then has presented many fine radio programs of both network and local origin. The station, located on the West Virginia - Virginia border in the county of Frederick, is under the management of Richard Field Lewis, Jr., and serves an area of nearly 5,000 radio homes.

— The Billboard,

The station began carrying Standard Oil's "Your Esso Weather Reporter" spots on April 22, 1946. The Esso programs included the "latest weather prediction and [a] brief commercial". WINC began carrying programming from the Keystone Broadcasting System (KBS) and Lang–Worth Feature Programs in 1946 and 1948 respectively. Both Keystone and Lang-Worth were electrical transcription networks. Programming from Lang-Worth was removed from the station's schedule in 1951, while Keystone programming remained until 1960. Richard F. Lewis, Jr., launched WINC-FM, sister station to WINC, on November 18, 1946.

A January 1947 contest on WINC was responsible for knocking out the entire telephone system for the city of Winchester. Mark Sheeler, a disc jockey at WINC, gave a "wolf whistle" as the signal for Winchester area "housewives" to call the studio. The first one to reach him would win "a free pair of nylon hose and a $10 handbag". The station received around 4,000 simultaneous phone calls; the first call to get through was from the telephone company. Sheeler was informed that his contest was jamming local phone lines. He quickly made an on-air announcement calling off the contest.

On August 8, 1947, WINC applied to move from 1400 to 950 kHz. In the same application, the station requested an increase in the station's power to 1,000 watts during the day and 500 watts at night. More than two years later, the application was dismissed and WINC remained at its original frequency and power.

Fourteen-year-old country music singer Virginia "Ginny" Hensley, who later became Patsy Cline, began her career by making her broadcast debut on WINC in 1948. Hensley asked "Joltin'" Jim McCoy, the leader of a "hillbilly band" called "The Melody Playboys", about to perform on the station, for a chance to sing with them. She told the band leader, "If you just give me a chance to sing with you, I'll never ask for pay." Cline continued to perform regularly on Saturday mornings on WINC. In 1948 and 1949, respectively, Bing Crosby and Bob Hope visited WINC, where they were interviewed on-the-air. Crosby and Hope were each in town for the city's annual Shenandoah Apple Blossom Festival.

In early 1950, Lewis hired Whittaker Chambers. Chambers was an American journalist (who had previously worked at Time Magazine), Communist Party member, and a former Soviet agent. Chambers was a "principal figure in the Alger Hiss case".

WINC joined the NBC Radio Network (previously named NBC Red) on November 1, 1951, after more than ten years as an ABC affiliate (previously called NBC Blue). WINC rejoined ABC Radio, carrying both networks' programming, on January 18, 1952, but dropped NBC programming in 1953. WINC became one of the flagship members of the Washington Senators Baseball Network, established in May 1952. The station added the long-running Voice of Prophecy program on June 3, 1953. On October 18, 1957, WINC owner Richard F. Lewis, Jr., died, and control of WINC passed to his widow, Marion Park Lewis. Ownership of the station was transferred again on January 31, 1964, from Richard F. Lewis Jr., Inc., a company owned by Marion Park Lewis, to Mid-Atlantic Network Inc., a corporation wholly owned by the Lewis family.

The station applied for and received a construction permit on August 9, 1958, to increase its broadcasting power from 250 to 1,000 watts, both day and night. The FCC approved the application in January 1961 but only for a daytime power increase. In 1959, WINC engineer Philip Whitney designed a CONELRAD alarm device for FM stations. The CONELRAD system allowed for early nationwide warnings in the event of possible enemy attack during the Cold War. Whitney is also credited with creating many of the remote control systems used by radio stations, including the microwave remote control system. The National Association of Broadcasters presented Whitney with its annual Engineering Award on April 7, 1970, for his work.

==== 1960s through 1980s ====
In the 1960s, the station hosted interviews with several prominent figures. Paul Harvey, in town for a speaking engagement, broadcast his "News and Comment" program from WINC studios on April 14, 1962. President Lyndon B. Johnson, visiting for the Apple Blossom Festival in 1964, was interviewed live on the station. The station was the first in Winchester to announce the assassinations of John F. Kennedy in 1963 and Robert F. Kennedy in 1968.

While attempting to renew the station's license in early 1971, Mid-Atlantic Network ran into trouble with the FCC due to the quantity of commercials the station was airing. The station was carrying 22 minutes of commercials an hour according to a letter from then-FCC Broadcast Bureau Chief Francis R. Welsh. Welsh said in the letter that the FCC was not convinced the amount of commercials served the community in a positive way. At the time, the FCC allowed no more than 18 minutes of commercials per hour. However, the station's license was ultimately renewed on May 14, 1971.

WINC reporter Archie McKay was one of the first reporters on scene of the TWA Flight 514 accident. The accident, which occurred on December 1, 1974, along the Clarke/Loudoun county line atop Mount Weather, killed all 92 passengers and crew aboard.

Part of WINC's programming in 1977 included daily political commentaries from former California governor Ronald Reagan. WINC remained an ABC Radio affiliate in 1978, carrying its American Contemporary Network with a middle of the road music format. WINC added adult contemporary music to its format in 1980. In 1981, the first year for which ratings information is available, WINC led all other area stations with a 16.3 rating. (Note: "Ratings – Nielsen's in TV and Arbitron's in radio – help determine how much advertisers are charged to run commercials during TV programs and radio listening hours. The higher the rating, the more people there are watching and listening. That translates into a higher price for a commercial spot.") The station dropped the middle of the road music in 1982, airing only adult contemporary music. In 1985, WINC removed ABC Radio's "American Contemporary Network" from its schedule in favor of ABC's "American Entertainment Network", while continuing to air an adult contemporary format. The station increased its nighttime power to 1,000 watts in 1986. The news department at WINC received an Associated Press Broadcasters Association national award for "Best Radio Spot News" in 1988.

==== 1988 "Lottery" lawsuit ====
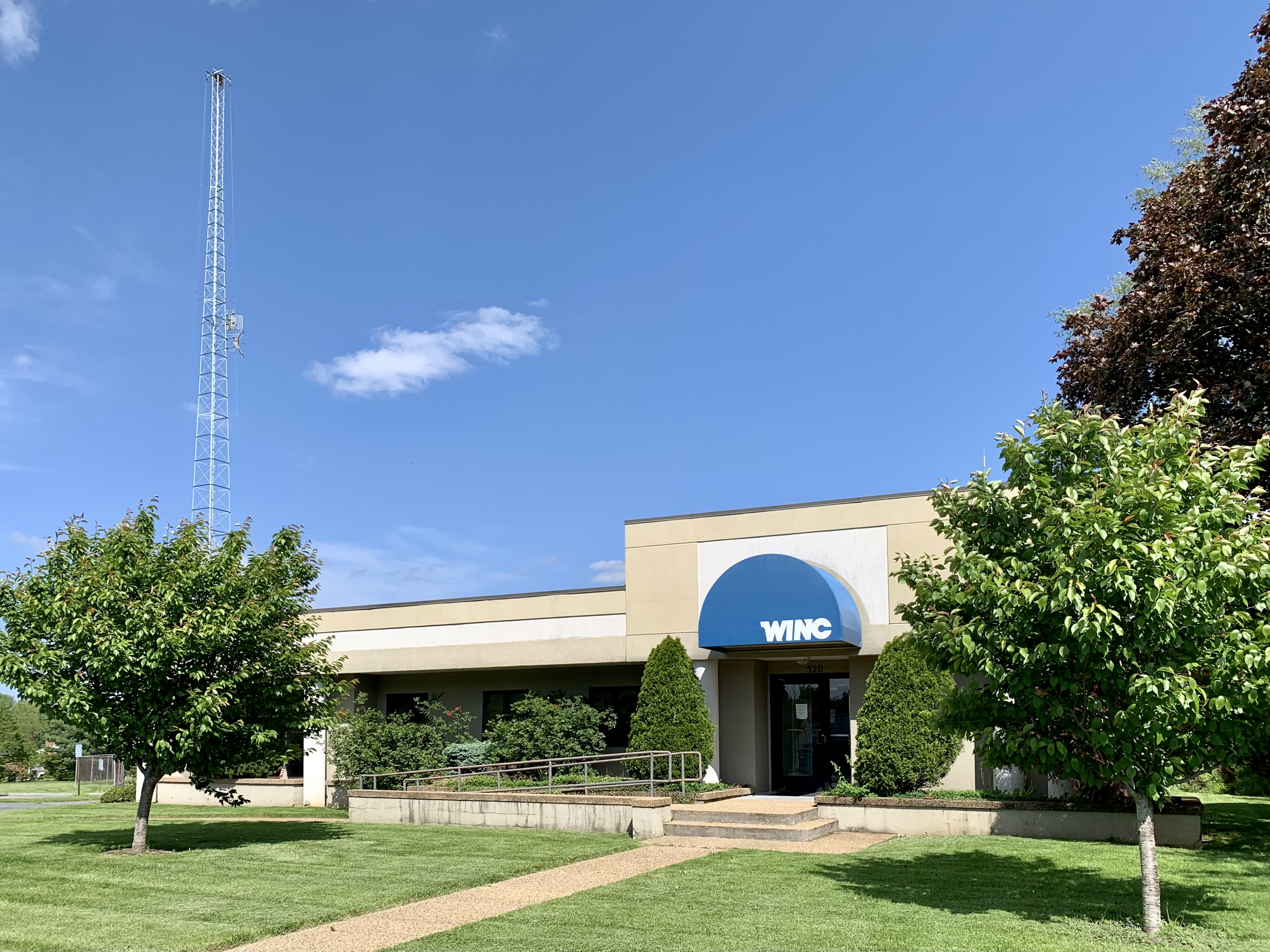
WINC's former studios and transmitting tower; the tower was dismantled in 2021.

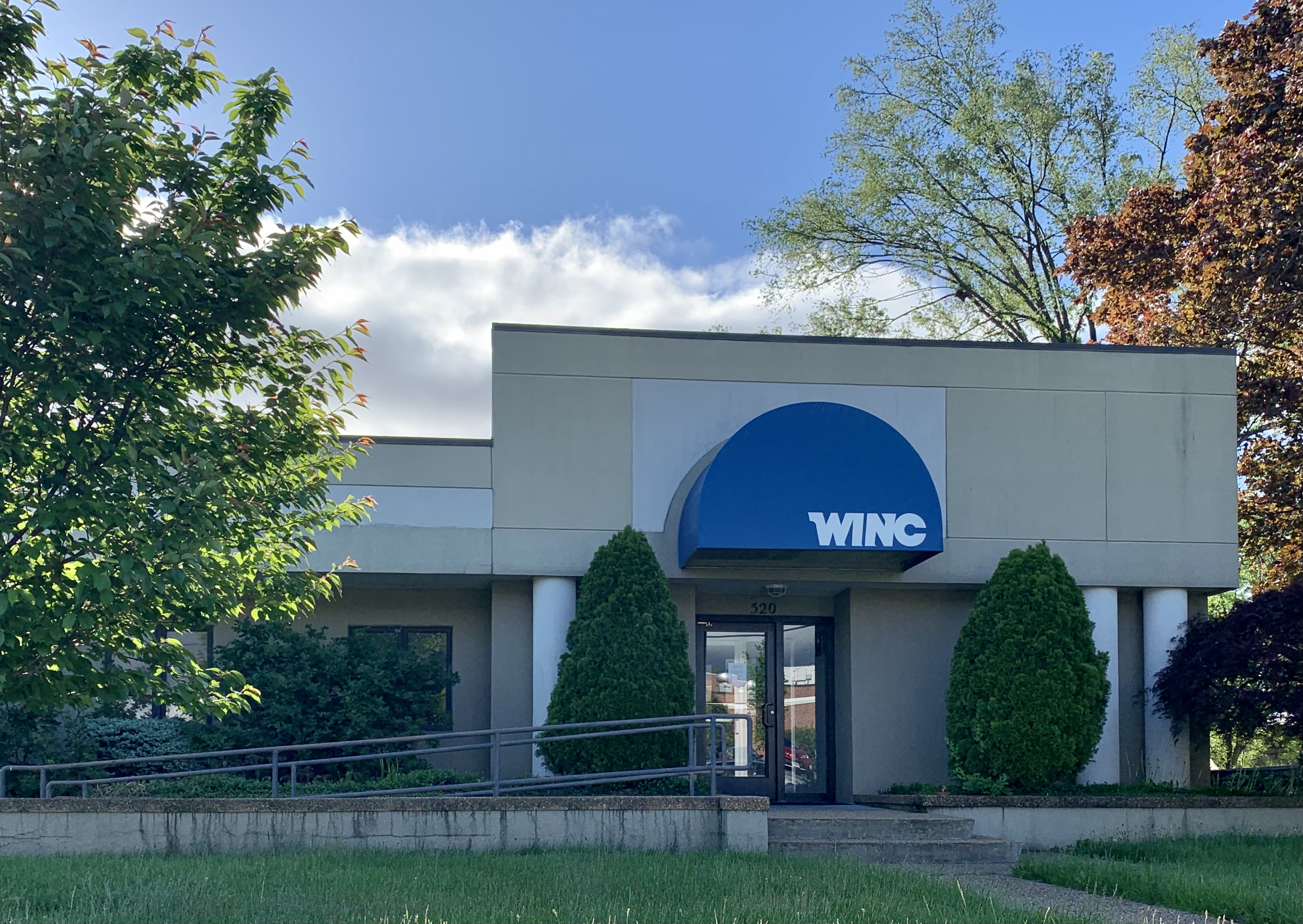
WINC's former studios at 520 North Pleasant Valley Road in Winchester.

The local prosecutor, City of Winchester Commonwealth's Attorney Paul Thomson, filed suit against WINC and sister station WINC-FM in June 1988 for a promotion Thomson called an "illegal cash lottery". A license plate number of a car with a WINC bumper sticker was announced over the air, and the owner was given 92 minutes to call in and choose to accept a prize of $92 or give up the money for a chance of winning $9,200. Thomson compared the contest to the game show Let's Make a Deal. On December 19, 1988, Winchester Circuit Court Judge Perry Sarver ruled in favor of WINC stating he did not believe "promotional plans such as was used ... are in violation of the lottery statute". Sarver also said it would require a "substantial expenditure" for the contest to be considered a lottery.

==== 1990s and after ====
By 1991, WINC was airing a classic hits format, which was dropped a year later, returning to adult contemporary. Talk programs were added in 1994 and all music dropped two years after that. Also in 1996, WINC became an affiliate of AP Radio. With the change to news/talk, WINC garnered only a 2.9 in the 1996 radio ratings. In contrast, sister station WINC-FM received a 12.1 during the same ratings period.

The station's Internet presence also began in 1996, as a subpage within sister station WINC-FM's website. WINC launched its own website in 2008. In 1998, WINC began using the slogan "The Right Side of the AM Dial". The station picked up CBS and CNN affiliations in 2000, dropping the Associated Press.

On October 22, 2007, WINC debuted a live and local morning show called The Winchester Morning Magazine airing weekdays from 6 a.m. to 10 a.m. The program, hosted by Michael Haman, featured topics ranging from local general interest to news. The program was cancelled under a year later in September 2008, and the station returned to syndicated programming in the mornings. Also in 2008, WINC began using the "First in Winchester, First in News" slogan.

==== Centennial ownership ====
On May 17, 2007, Mid-Atlantic Network announced it was selling WINC to North Carolina–based Centennial Broadcasting. The price of the sale, initially reported at $36 million, also included WINC-FM, WWRT and WWRE in Winchester and WBQB and WFVA in Fredericksburg. Later reports had the price of the sale at $35.972 million.

Centennial CEO Allen B. Shaw, commenting in a Winchester Star interview on the sale, said he had been considering buying the company for several months. At the time of the interview, he did not foresee any changes to the stations. The sale closed in August 2007, and in the last ratings book under Lewis Family ownership, WINC received a 2.7 rating. The station's ratings have stayed within a two- to three-point range, while the format has remained the same after the sale.

WINC celebrated its 75th year on the air on June 26, 2016. The station aired vignettes with former employees and a classic photo album was added on the station's website.

Then sister-station WZFC (on the FM dial) began simulcasting WINC on January 31, 2018, extending WINC's programming into Front Royal and Woodstock, as well as parts of Warren and Shenandoah Counties in Virginia. The addition of the FM simulcast was something operations manager Mike Herald had considered "for quite some time" but only brought to fruition due to the current political climate. Herald felt the "conservative lean" of the hosts aired by WINC would "resonate really well with the folks here in the valley." The fact that Warren and Shenandoah Counties voted Republican or "red" by "at least a 30-point margin" in the 2016 presidential election and the 2017 Virginia gubernatorial election also made it a "natural fit".

==== 2020 and 2021 Centennial divestitures ====
Centennial Broadcasting began divesting their Winchester properties starting in 2020. Centennial president and CEO Allen B. Shaw admitted to the Winchester Star that "we're a very small company ... it's a challenge for us". WINC-FM was the first station divested, with Educational Media Foundation announcing its $1.75 million purchase on October 8, 2020. WINC, WZFC and WXBN were retained. Prior to WINC-FM switching to EMF's Air1 network, the station's intellectual property moved to a two-station simulcast of WZFC and WXBN by mid-November, with the latter station renamed WINC-FM; in the process, WINC lost its full-time FM simulcast. Following that realignment, Centennial agreed to sell WINC-FM and WZFC to Fairfax, Virginia–based Metro Radio, Inc. for $225,000, a deal made mostly out of "financial considerations". As a result, WINC and its long-time studio facility which the station has been in since its launch were now the only remaining pieces of the original Lewis cluster.

Allen Shaw said in a May 2021 interview with the Star that WINC hadn't experienced "great financial success" further compounded with the recent death of Rush Limbaugh, whose syndicated show had been a long-time fixture on the station. While Shaw said he would "hate for" WINC to "go dark", he "[couldn't] rule it out", but hoped to either donate the station to a nonprofit organization or sell it "if the right buyer came along".

==== Change to WZFC and sale to Colonial ====
The uncertainty of WINC's future coincided with the station celebrating its 80th anniversary on June 26, 2021. Four days later, the call sign changed to WZFC, assuming the calls of WINC's former FM simulcast, which became WKDV-FM. The next day, on July 1, 2021, Colonial Radio Group of Williamsport, LLC, began operating WZFC via a local marketing agreement with an option to purchase for $25,000. Colonial owner Todd Bartley told the Star, "it's a tremendous honor to take a legacy [station] like this one forward". Allen Shaw told the Star that Centennial attempted to give the station for free to Metro Radio as part of the sale of WINC-FM and 104.9 FM but "Metro didn't want it". Had Colonial not purchased WZFC, the station would have ceased broadcasting with the license returned to the FCC, a possibility Shaw felt "would have been bad" for the region. Colonial completed the acquisition of WZFC on October 22, 2021.

While new to Winchester, Bartley had prior experience as a broadcaster, programmer and station owner in Ohio and Pennsylvania. Under the Colonial name, Bartley previously owned WEJS and WLYC in Williamsport, Pennsylvania, but the two stations were taken under receivership and divested by a bankruptcy trustee in 2020. WZFC's studios and transmitter site were not included in the sale; Centennial disclosed that the building would either be sold or demolished, while the tower would be taken down "eventually". Bartley said Colonial was already negotiating with another radio station for a replacement tower, and applied to diplex WZFC from the daytime tower site of WXVA. Centennial dismantled the WINC tower on November 3, 2021, with Bartley moving the studios to a facility on Garber Lane. Bartley went on to say while Colonial intends for WZFC to carry additional local fare, the station's existing talk format would be retained.

Metro sold WINC-FM (having divested WKDV-FM in October 2021) to Euclid Avenue Properties, a local group headed by funeral home operator Darrin Jones with Bartley as a partner, for $250,000 on October 7, 2022. Jones, a certified public accountant by trade, organized the purchase on referral from Bartley in reaction to Metro operating WINC-FM as a Leesburg station from Chantilly with no Winchester-based programming. The deal closed in December 2022. Former Centennial executive Bruce Simel praised both the WINC-FM sale and Bartley's success relocating WZFC's studios and transmitter, saying, "this is great news for local businesses and anyone that loves Winchester ... WINC has, and always will, stand for Winchester." While Jones would oversee WINC-FM and Bartley would continue to operate 1400 AM, Jones told the Star, "we've joined together in the running and management of both stations". Accordingly, Bartley filed paperwork with the FCC to change WZFC's call sign back to WINC, which was done on February 25, 2023.

== Programming ==
WINC carries a news/talk/sports format established in 1996. The weekday lineup consists of nationally-syndicated conservative talk shows hosted by Larry O'Connor, Glenn Beck, Todd Starnes, Hugh Hewitt, Mark Levin, Bill O'Reilly, McGraw Milhaven, and Will Cain.. America in the Morning and Coast to Coast AM are also featured. The station was previously the home of Rush Limbaugh, Jim Bohannon, and Charlie Kirk until their deaths in 2021, 2022 and 2025, respectively. Pittsburgh-based Wendy Bell was also previously heard on WINC.

WINC carries five-minute newscasts every hour from Fox News Radio. The station also has a news department that prepares and broadcasts local news reports. WINC airs numerous sports events as an affiliate of the Virginia Sports Radio Network, which carries University of Virginia football and basketball and the Virginia Tech Sports Network, which carries Virginia Tech football and basketball. The station carries Washington Wizards games. Local college sports from the Shenandoah University Hornets and the Christendom College Crusaders can also be heard.

Weekend programming on WINC includes home-improvement shows In the Garden with Andre Viette and At Home with Gary Sullivan. Sunday Night with Bill Cunningham, along with programming from the Vegas Stats & Information Network (VSIN} is also heard.

== References, notes and sources ==
=== Sources ===
- Whitney, Philip. WINC Collection. Winchester, Virginia: Stewart Bell Jr. Archives, 1616 THL, Handley Regional Library.
