= WLZV =

K-Love radio station in Buckland, Virginia

- Buckland, Virginia; United States
- Broadcast area: Northern Virginia; Shenandoah Valley
- Frequency: 94.3 MHz
- Branding: K-Love

Programming
- Language: English
- Format: Contemporary Christian
- Network: K-Love

Ownership
- Owner: Educational Media Foundation
- Sister stations: WLVW; WTCF; WAIW

History
- First air date: November 2, 1978
- Former call signs: WQRA (1978–96); WINX-FM (1996–97); WTOP-FM (1997–98); WUPP (1998–99); WPLC (1999–2000); WPLC-FM (2000–01); WBPS-FM (2001–06); WWXX (2006–17)

Technical information
- Licensing authority: FCC
- Facility ID: 16819
- Class: A
- ERP: 2,000 watts
- HAAT: 175 meters (574 ft)
- Transmitter coordinates: 38°44′31.4″N 77°50′5.9″W

Links
- Public license information: Public file; LMS
- Webcast: Listen live
- Website: klove.com

WLZV (94.3 FM) – branded K-Love – is a non-commercial contemporary Christian radio station licensed to serve Buckland, Virginia. Owned and operated by the Educational Media Foundation, WLZV does not broadcast any local programming, functioning as the Northern Virginia network affiliate for K-Love; WLZV also services the southwestern portion of the Washington metropolitan area.

== History ==
WQRA signed on November 2, 1978, as a local station serving Warrenton, Virginia, with middle-of-the-road music and local news coverage.

In 1996, the station was sold by Dettra Broadcasting to Bill Parris' Radio Broadcasting Communications, owner of WINX (1600 AM) in Rockville, Maryland. Parris flipped the station in September 1996 to WINX-FM, a simulcast of WINX's oldies music.

The station became WTOP-FM in September 1997; it was the first FM outlet of all-news WTOP, which at the time was on 1500 AM. In February 1998, Bonneville International, the owner of WTOP, bought it from Parris. Bonneville subsequently traded the station and cash to Syd Abel in exchange for his higher-powered 107.7 FM. The transaction was completed the next month, and Abel moved over his "rocking country" format, branded as WUPP "Up Country". One year later, on April 28, 1999, Abel flipped the station to WPLC "The Pulse", playing hot adult contemporary crossed with alternative rock hits.

Mega Communications purchased the station in 2000. Mega first broadcast a format of Spanish love songs, renaming the station WPLC-FM as they added a simulcast with 1050 AM in Washington, which became WPLC. The following year, Mega changed the callsign to WBPS-FM and joined it with WBZS-FM 92.7 in Prince Frederick, Maryland, in a Spanish adult contemporary simulcast branded as "La Nueva Mega". In 2005, the stations switched to Spanish oldies as "Mega Clasica".

Washington Redskins owner Daniel Snyder bought the two stations, as well as Mega's WKDL (730 AM) in Alexandria, Virginia, in 2006. The new three-station network ran a new simulcast as "Triple X ESPN Radio", creating an ESPN Radio-based sports talk competitor to WTEM (980 AM). WBPS-FM changed to WWXX to reflect the branding. In 2008, Snyder bought WTEM itself, and the network became simply "ESPN 980" with no other changes to the two FM stations.

Snyder began selling off his radio properties during 2017; Educational Media Foundation bought 94.3 FM and flipped it to WLZV with their national contemporary Christian music network, K-Love.
