= WLVW =

K-Love radio station in Washington, D.C.

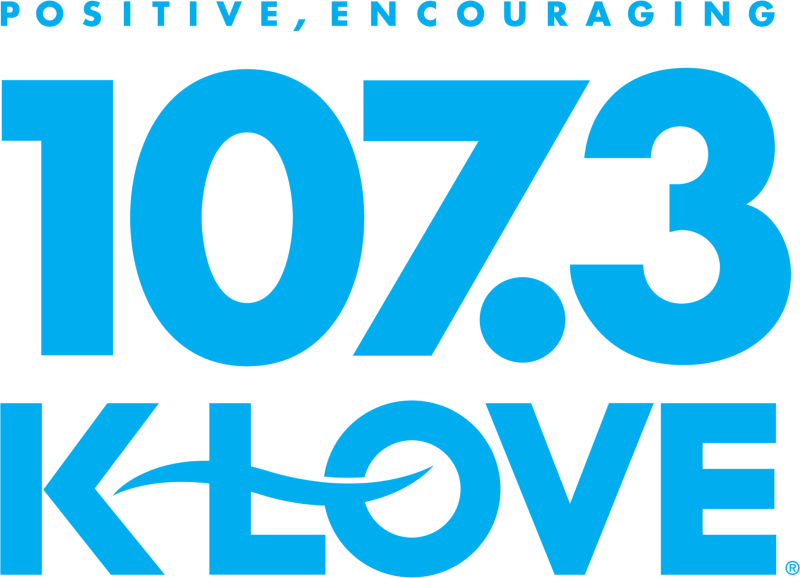
- Washington, D.C.; United States
- Broadcast area: Washington metropolitan area
- Frequency: 107.3 MHz (HD Radio)
- RDS: K-LOVE

Programming
- Language: English
- Format: Christian adult contemporary
- Subchannels: HD2: Christian adult hits (K-LOVE Eras); HD3: Spanish Christian (Radio Nueva Vida)
- Network: K-Love

Ownership
- Owner: Educational Media Foundation
- Sister stations: WLZV; WTCF; WAIW

History
- First air date: May 15, 1948
- Former call signs: WMAL-FM (1948–1977); WRQX (1977–2019); WSOM (2019)
- Call sign meaning: K-Love Washington

Technical information
- Licensing authority: FCC
- Facility ID: 73252
- Class: B
- ERP: 19,500 watts
- HAAT: 246 meters (807 ft)
- Transmitter coordinates: 38.950°N 77.079°W

Links
- Public license information: Public file; LMS
- Website: www.klove.com

WLVW (107.3 FM) – branded as K-Love – is a non-commercial Christian adult contemporary radio station licensed to serve Washington, D.C. Owned and operated by the Educational Media Foundation, WLVW does not broadcast any local programming, functioning as the Washington metropolitan area network affiliate for K-Love. The station's transmitter resides in the district's northwest quadrant. In addition to a standard analog transmission, WLVW is available online; the station also broadcasts in the HD Radio format.

== History ==
=== WMAL-FM ===
On May 15, 1948, the station signed on as WMAL-FM, owned by The Washington Evening Star. WMAL-FM mostly simulcast co-owned WMAL (630 AM), the market's ABC Radio Network affiliate; as network programming moved from radio to television in the 1950s, WMAL and WMAL-FM switched to a full service middle of the road format.

In the late 1960s, WMAL-FM switched to a combination of easy listening and classical music, mostly automated with the exception of Harden and Weaver, which aired on both WMAL and WMAL-FM Monday through Saturday mornings. In the 1970s, WMAL-FM flipped to album-oriented rock as "The Soft Explosion". Live disc jockeys were added and automation was cut back to nights and weekends.

In 1977, ABC acquired WMAL-AM-FM for $16 million, then a record price.

=== WRQX ===
WMAL-FM changed its call sign to WRQX on December 7, 1977. On April 15, 1979, WRQX changed to CHR/Top 40, branded as "Q107", the station eliminated automation completely. At noon on August 31, 1990, the station changed to hot adult contemporary, branded as "Mix 107.3". The first song on "Mix" was "Let The Music Play" by Shannon.

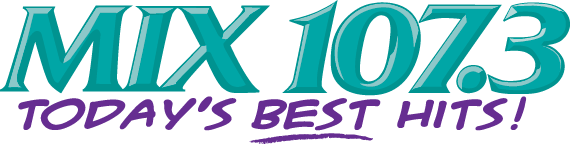
Former logo used between 1990 and 2011

WRQX was one of the many Disney/ABC Radio stations that merged with Citadel Broadcasting in 2007. Citadel, in turn, merged with Cumulus Media on September 16, 2011. Previous slogans have been "Not too hard, Not too light", "The Best Mix of the 80s, 90s & Today", "The Best Mix of... Everything", "Washington's Best Music Mix", "Today's Best Hits", "All the Hits", "More Music, More Variety", and "DC's Best Music Mix".

On April 27, 2013, long-time morning show host Jack Diamond was unexpectedly released from the station when his contract expired and management declined to renew it. Diamond had been at the station since the day it flipped to "Mix" in 1990. There was speculation that the station would take the morning show in a new direction to compete against top 40-formatted WIHT. Bert Weiss, the host of "The Bert Show" on co-owned WWWQ in Atlanta (and formerly Diamond's co-host), took over morning drive time on WRQX, beginning May 16. "The Bert Show" was syndicated from Atlanta.

On August 19, 2013, WRQX began to slowly phase out its "Mix" moniker, and began emphasizing the slogan "All The Hits", as well as shifting its playlist towards more current music, while dropping all 1980s and most 1990s material. Rival company Clear Channel Communications picked up word on this potential shift, and began registering domain names such as "allthehits1073.com" and "q1073dc.com" to prevent Cumulus from using them. Those domains redirected to WIHT's website. On August 28, WRQX completed its shift back to top 40, then branded as "All The Hits 107.3".

On May 2, 2014, WRQX dropped "The Bert Show" after one year, due to low ratings. Marco, who had previously been the station's afternoon drive personality, took over morning drive on an interim basis three days later. On July 30, 2014, the "Sarah, Ty and Mel Show" debuted on 107.3. It was heard weekdays from 6–10 am, and was hosted by Sarah Fraser (formerly of The Kane Show), Ty Bentli (who would later host the syndicated Nash FM country music morning show) and Melanie Glazener (who also worked with Fraser on The Kane Show). Also in July 2014, WRQX was re-branded as "DC's 107.3".

During September and October 2015, WRQX began shifting back towards hot AC. On November 9, 2015, Louie Diaz was announced as WRQX's new program director, replacing Jan Jeffries. On that same day, the station's air staff was dismissed, leading to rumors of a format change, possibly back to hot AC, once again as "Mix 107.3". Rival WIHT was ranked 4th in the market with a 5.9 share, while WRQX was ranked #18 with a 2.1 share of the market according to the October 2015 Nielsen ratings report.

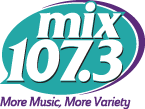
Last Mix 107.3 logo, 2015-2019

On November 11, 2015, Cumulus announced that WRQX would revert to its "Mix 107.3" branding on November 13. In addition, the station began playing Christmas music beginning at 3 pm on November 13. Cumulus initially said the Christmas format would be heard through the holiday season; however, it turned out to be a stunt, only lasting for that weekend. At 6 am on November 16, the station officially relaunched as "Mix" with the return of morning host Jack Diamond. The move proved popular and WRQX's ratings began to improve.

=== Sale to Educational Media Foundation ===
On February 13, 2019, Rocklin, California-based nonprofit broadcaster, Educational Media Foundation (EMF) entered into an agreement with Cumulus to purchase WRQX, along with five other Cumulus Media stations in New York City, Atlanta, San Jose, Savannah and Syracuse, for $103.5 million. This transaction would allow Cumulus to generate "substantial cash for debt repayment and investment in other business opportunities", according to its President and CEO Mary Berner. EMF also owns existing K-Love affiliate WLZV in Buckland, Virginia, about 40 miles (64 km) southwest of Washington. After the sale received final approval by the FCC, EMF announced that WRQX and the other Cumulus stations acquired would all begin broadcasting its primary programming service, K-Love, on June 1, at midnight local time.

On May 28, Jack Diamond announced the station's format change, set for May 31 at 7:00 pm—five hours earlier than originally planned—and that he would host the final hour of commercial programming on "Mix 107.3"; he also said he would return to the air at another station, but his new gig was never revealed. At the aforementioned time, after playing "Cherish" by The Association and a final goodbye from Jack Diamond, the station changed to contemporary Christian music as part of EMF's K-Love network.

Prior to EMF's takeover of the station, Cumulus transferred the WRQX callsign onto the former WSOM (600 AM) in Salem, Ohio, in a callsign "parking" move; Cumulus retained rights to the WRQX callsign in the transaction. For part of May 31, 2019, the callsign WSOM was used on 107.3; after switching to K-Love, the station name changed to WLVW, a callsign which had been in use on a K-Love station in Salisbury, Maryland.
