= WTCF =

- Wardensville, West Virginia; United States
- Broadcast area: Winchester metropolitan area
- Frequency: 103.3 MHz (HD Radio)
- Branding: K-Love

Programming
- Format: Christian adult contemporary
- Subchannels: HD2: Southern gospel "Joy FM"
- Network: K-Love

Ownership
- Owner: Educational Media Foundation
- Sister stations: WAIW; WLVW; WLZV

History
- First air date: August 15, 2012
- Call sign meaning: "The Cross FM" (former branding/format)

Technical information
- Licensing authority: FCC
- Facility ID: 189559
- Class: A
- Power: 350 watts
- HAAT: 410 meters (1,350 ft)
- Transmitter coordinates: 39°10′58.3″N 78°23′22″W
- Translator: HD2: 98.9 W255CK (Front Royal, Virginia)

Links
- Public license information: Public file; LMS
- Webcast: Listen live HD2: Listen live
- Website: www.klove.com HD2: joyfm.org

WTCF is a Christian adult contemporary formatted broadcast radio station licensed to Wardensville, West Virginia, serving the Winchester metropolitan area. WTCF is owned and operated by Educational Media Foundation.

== Pre-broadcast history ==
On May 23, 2011, the Federal Communications Commission (FCC) announced Alex Media, Inc. as high bidder and winner of the auction for the 103.3 FM frequency to be located in Wardensville, West Virginia, part of Auction 91. Alex Media filed a construction permit on August 17, 2011, for a radio station to broadcast on that frequency and transmit from Little North Mountain in western Frederick County, Virginia.

A potential problem between the new station and existing station WLTK, which was also broadcasting on 103.3, was corrected after Alex Media asked the FCC to file a "Show Cause" notice asking WLTK to move to vacant frequency 102.9 FM. On November 7, 2011, WLTK filed to move from 103.3 FM to 102.9 FM, allowing Alex Media to begin broadcasting on 103.3 FM without interference. On June 15, 2012, the owners of WLTK applied for and were granted a new broadcast license moving it from 103.3 to 102.9, but from the same location and tower, at the same power and over the same coverage area as previously. On June 19, 2012, WLTK officially switched frequencies from 103.3 to 102.9 MHz.

The call sign WTCF was awarded on March 19, 2012, and on June 21, 2012, it was announced on "The Cross FM", a web-only radio station broadcasting from WTRM's studios in Winchester, Virginia, that it would launch on WTCF in "45 to 60 days".

On June 25, 2012, Alex Media entered into an Option Agreement to sell WTCF to WTRM owners Timber Ridge Ministries, Inc. for $650,000. A time brokerage agreement was also entered on the same date. On the same day, Alex Media applied for a construction permit to move to another tower, 100 feet (30 m) from the authorized tower, with an increase in power, from 340 watts to 350 watts. One day later on July 26, the station announced via their official Facebook page, that they would be launching on September 4, but will be in "testing mode" during the month of August. At 10 am, on August 15, WTCF began operations in "testing mode".

On August 28, Alex Media filed an "Application for Construction Permit for Commercial Broadcast Station" for WTCF in advance of the station's September 4 launch. It would not be until one month later, on September 28, that WTCF would apply for and be granted an FM broadcast license. WTCF ended their "testing mode" programming and officially launched on September 4, 2012, at 9 am.

== Sale of WTRM ==
On February 6, 2013, Timber Ridge Ministries sold WTRM to the American Family Association for $1.1 million. The sale was approved by the Federal Communications Commission (FCC) on March 28, and was closed on April 11. At 8:30 pm on April 11, WTRM officially switched to American Family Radio programming with "Southern Light" programming remaining online on a Timber Ridge Ministries owned website. WTCF was not part of the sale and programming on WTCF was not affected.

== Sale of WTCF ==
Alex Media, Inc. filed an Asset Purchase Agreement with the Federal Communications Commission (FCC) on July 5, beginning the process of selling WTCF to Timber Ridge Ministries for $650,000. Alex Media had previously entered into an Option Agreement to sell WTCF to Timber Ridge Ministries for $650,000 back on June 25, 2012. An application to assign the WTCF license to Timber Ridge Ministries was filed on August 26, and was consummated on September 1.

WTCF signed off its hybrid contemporary Christian/Christian rock/Christian hip hop after just 18 months on the air, switching to southern gospel as "Southern Light" at noon on March 27, 2014. The "Southern Light" format was previously heard on WTRM.

== Sold again ==
On May 19, Educational Media Foundation (EMF) purchased WTCF from Timber Ridge Ministries for $425,000. Timber Ridge sold the station for $175,000 less than what they purchased it for in 2013. In its filing with the FCC, EMF announced plans to make WTCF an affiliate of their K-Love network.

The FCC granted the sale of WTCF on July 2. Timber Ridge closed on a sale of nearby station, WVRS, on July 3. Four days later, the station began simulcasting its southern gospel format on WVRS.

At midnight on August 1, the simulcast of WVRS and WTCF ended. The southern gospel format remained on WVRS, with K-Love programming beginning on WTCF. The sale of WTCF to EMF was closed on September 2.
