= WIKG =

- Waynesboro, Pennsylvania; United States
- Broadcast area: Hagerstown metropolitan area
- Frequency: 1380 kHz
- Branding: 100.9 Next FM

Programming
- Language: English
- Format: Top 40 (CHR)

Ownership
- Owner: Verstandig Broadcasting; (HJV Limited Partnership)
- Sister stations: WAYZ; WBHB

History
- First air date: August 9, 1953
- Former call signs: WAYZ (1953–1993); WHGT (1993–2005); WCBG (2005–2019); WLIN (2019–2025)
- Call sign meaning: Kris Kringle (callsign moved from 92.1 FM)

Technical information
- Licensing authority: FCC
- Facility ID: 27402
- Class: D
- Power: 1,000 watts (daytime); 20 watts (nighttime)
- Transmitter coordinates: 39°44′20.3″N 77°36′9″W
- Translator: 100.9 W265DU (Waynesboro)

Links
- Public license information: Public file; LMS
- Webcast: Listen live
- Website: www.thenextfm.com

WIKG (1380 kHz) is a commercial AM radio station licensed to Waynesboro, Pennsylvania. It is owned by VerStandig Media and airs a Top 40 (CHR) format.

== History ==
In the 1950s, as WAYZ, the station was owned by Richard Field Lewis Jr. (1907–1957), owner of the Richard Field Lewis Jr. Stations (later Mid Atlantic Network Inc.).

AM 1380 spent years as country music formatted WAYZ, later gaining an FM station on 101.5. WAYZ changed calls in 1993, to WHGT pending a format change that never happened. When WAYZ-FM moved to FM 104.7 in September 2000, AM 1380 changed to a simulcasting of classic rock "Star 92.1" WSRT. On February 28, 2005, when FM 92.1 changed their format to contemporary hit radio as "The Point", sister station WCBG (1590 AM) was sold and the calls and talk radio format moved to AM 1380.

The WCBG calls were on AM 1590 until January 1, 2005. VerStandig Broadcasting "donated" the station to Emmanuel Baptist Temple after a very public battle over the station's tower, which was in Chambersburg city limits. On January 1, WCBG switched calls with WHGT and moved all programming to AM 1380 and AM 1590 fell silent. AM 1590 would remain silent until December 4, 2005.

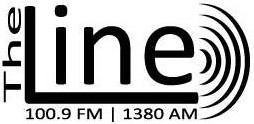
Logo as "The Line"

On August 12, 2019, the station changed its call sign to WLIN. On August 15, WLIN changed its format from ESPN Radio sports to talk/sports, branded as "The Line" to match the new call sign.

On October 7, 2024, WLIN dropped the talk portion of its format and switched to Fox Sports Radio programming, branded as "Fox Sports Mason-Dixon". The sports programming of WIKG (92.1 FM) in Mercersburg was combined with the WLIN format on WLIN's frequency on September 1, 2025, as part of a shuffle of frequencies and call signs spurred by the sale of WAYZ (104.7 FM).

On April 6, 2026, WIKG changed their format from sports to Top 40/CHR, branded as "100.9 Next FM".
