= WVRS =

- Gore, Virginia; United States
- Broadcast area: Western Frederick County, Virginia; Eastern Hampshire County, West Virginia
- Frequency: 90.1 MHz
- Branding: Classic Southern Gospel Music

Programming
- Format: Southern gospel

Ownership
- Owner: Point FM Ministries, Inc.
- Sister stations: WVRX

History
- First air date: 2011
- Call sign meaning: "Victory Radio Shenandoah" (former owner/branding)

Technical information
- Licensing authority: FCC
- Facility ID: 122630
- Class: A
- ERP: 250 watts
- HAAT: 421 meters (1,381 ft)
- Transmitter coordinates: 39°11′2.3″N 78°23′14″W

Links
- Public license information: Public file; LMS
- Webcast: Listen live
- Website: southernlight.fm

WVRS is a United States southern gospel formatted broadcast radio station licensed to Gore, Virginia, serving Western Frederick County, Virginia and Eastern Hampshire County, West Virginia. WVRS is owned and operated by Point FM Ministries, Inc.

== History and sales ==
On February 7, 2014, Winchester, Virginia-based Timber Ridge Ministries filed to purchase WVRS from Liberty University for $30,000. The sale was closed on July 3, 2014. On July 7, 2014, WVRS began simulcasting Timber Ridge-owned and southern gospel-formatted WTCF.

At midnight on August 1, the simulcast of WVRS and WTCF ended. The southern gospel format remained on WVRS, with K-Love programming beginning on WTCF.

On October 10, 2014, owner Timber Ridge Ministries requested a construction permit to increase the station's wattage and lower the station's broadcast tower height. In the application with the Federal Communications Commission (FCC), the station's wattage would be increased from 9 watts to 250 watts. The station's tower broadcast height would be lowered from 462 meters (1,516 ft) to 421 meters (1,381 ft). The coverage area of WVRS would not increase over parts of the Independent City of Winchester or Frederick County, Virginia, but would, however, increase over neighboring Hampshire County, West Virginia.

In December 2014, an advertisement was posted on Craigslist regarding the sale of WVRS. In the ad, the station is referred to as a "250 watt radio station that covers all of Winchester, VA", referring to the station's construction permit and not the station's licensed wattage. The asking price is $100,000, though was previously listed at $135,000.

On April 7, 2015, WVRS fell silent and the station's website, live stream, and social media accounts all went offline. On November 23, 2015, WVRS returned to the air with the same southern gospel format, though as "The Point 90.1".

Paperwork dated December 30, 2015, to begin the sale of WVRS, was filed with the FCC on February 5, 2016. The station was sold to Middletown, Virginia-based Point FM Ministries, Inc. for $25,000. Point FM Ministries, Inc. had been operating the station under a Programming Services Agreement since November 18, 2015.

The station's power was increased to 250 watts (proposed in the October 10, 2014 application) on May 23, 2016. The sale of WVRS to Point FM Ministries, Inc. was consummated on June 2, 2016.
