= Heavyweight Wrestling =

Television series

Heavyweight Wrestling from Washington, or simply Heavyweight Wrestling, is the first weekly televised wrestling program that was produced by the Capitol Wrestling Corporation, a regional professional wrestling promotion and member of the National Wrestling Alliance, which was the predecessor of WWE. The show debuted on January 5, 1956, and aired until September 1971 when Vincent J. McMahon moved the television tapings to eastern Pennsylvania and replaced Heavyweight Wrestling with All-Star Wrestling. Host Ray Morgan stayed with All Star Wrestling until he was replaced by McMahon's son Vincent K. McMahon. The show was hosted by Bill Malone (1956), Morris Siegel (1956–1959), and Ray Morgan (1959–1971) and was taped at the Capital Arena in Washington, D.C.
