= Richard Field Lewis Jr. =

American radio network owner

Richard F. Lewis Jr.
- Born: Richard Field Lewis Jr. October 18, 1907; Winchester, Virginia, US
- Died: October 18, 1957 (aged 50); Washington, DC, US
- Occupation: Radio network owner
- Years active: 1941–1957
- Organization: Richard Field Lewis Jr. Stations
- Known for: Mid-Atlantic radio network (mid-20th century)
- Notable work: Established WINC AM radio
- Spouse: Marion Park Lewis
- Children: 3

Richard Field Lewis Jr. (May 18, 1907 – October 18, 1957) was an American radio network owner of Richard Field Lewis Jr. Stations (later Mid Atlantic Network Inc.) in the mid-20th Century.

== Background ==
Richard Field Lewis Jr. was born on May 18, 1907, in Winchester, Virginia. He had a sister, later known as Mrs. E.L. Anderson.

== Career ==
WINC..... WINCHESTER, VA
250 watts
Owned by Richard Field Lewis
Radio station WINC started operations in 1941, and since then has presented many fine radio programs of both network and local origin. The station, located on the West Virginia - Virginia border in the county of Frederick, is under the management of Richard Field Lewis, Jr., and serves an area of nearly 5,000 radio homes.
(The Billboard, 1 December 1951, page 52)

In 1941, Lewis built the station for and licensed WINC, an ABC affiliate, in Winchester, Virginia.

In 1946, he licensed WRFL (FM), also in Winchester.

In the early 1950s, Richard F. Lewis, Jr., hired Whittaker Chambers briefly at WINC—the first work Chambers got after he had left TIME magazine in December 1948 (as the Hiss Case turned from HUAC hearings in Washington, a slander suit in Baltimore, and a grand jury investigation in New York into a federal case against Alger Hiss).

In September 1952, Lewis licensed WLXW (AM) in Carlisle, Pennsylvania for $70,000.

By 1956-7, according to Telecasting Yearbook, Lewis owned a Mid-Atlantic network that comprised:

- Winchester, VA: WINC, WRFL (FM)
- Mt. Jackson, VA: WSIG (AM)
- Fredericksburg, VA: WFVA (AM) (60%)
- Waynesboro, PA: WAYZ (AM) (now WLIN)
- Carlisle, PA: WHYL (AM)
- Fisher, WV: WELD (AM)

At his death in 1957, his network had added WAGE (AM) in Leesburg, VA.

Upon his death, his wife Marion Park Lewis took over the business, renamed it "Mid Atlantic Network Inc.," and ran it from 1957 to 1971.

== Personal life and death ==
From Hogs to Hurricanes, WAGE Stays Tuned to the County
At 4 a.m. March 6, 1958, Loudoun County's first and only radio station went on the air. Only a handful of dairy farmers, up for the morning milking, heard John Richard "Radio" Gill announce the birth of WAGE, then 1290 (now 1200) on your AM dial...
The broadcast came as a surprise because only the night before did the Federal Communications Commission given WAGE permission to broadcast.
Gill, who had to bring his own records to play, was no stranger to radio. He had worked for WPPA in Pottsville, Pa., and WFMD in Frederick, Md., and ran a radio and electrical repair shop on King Street in Leesburg. Assisted by Phil Whitney, engineer and announcer at WAGE's parent station, WINC in Winchester, Gill had spent weeks setting up and testing the equipment at WAGE.
Richard Field Lewis Jr., WINC's president and owner of seven radio stations in Virginia, West Virginia and Pennsylvania, had known Gill as a fellow ham radio operator. One day, Lewis stopped by the shop and told Gill that he wanted to start a station in Brunswick or Leesburg. Gill recalls replying: "Brunswick is going down, down, down. Leesburg is only going up."
(The Washington Post, 3 March 2002)

Lewis married Marion Park Lewis; they had three sons—John, David, and Howard.

Lewis died age 50 on October 18, 1957, in Washington, DC, of natural causes while on a visit there from Winchester.

== Legacy ==
In addition to surviving radio stations, in 1992 his wife founded the Marion Park Lewis Foundation for the Arts, which offers scholarships for Northern Shenandoah Valley students.

== See also ==
- WINC (AM)
- WFVA
- WLIN (AM)
- WNDC
- WHYL
- WELD (AM)
- Radio network
- List of United States radio networks

== External sources ==
- FCC Data: WTSD
