= WFQX (FM) =

- Front Royal, Virginia; United States
- Broadcast area: Northern Shenandoah Valley
- Frequency: 99.3 MHz
- Branding: 99-3 The Fox

Programming
- Format: Classic rock
- Affiliations: Washington Commanders Radio Network

Ownership
- Owner: iHeartMedia; (iHM Licenses, LLC)
- Sister stations: W239BV, WKSI-FM, WMRE, WUSQ-FM

History
- First air date: January 17, 1973
- Former call signs: WFFV (1973–1985)
- Call sign meaning: play on the word "fox"

Technical information
- Licensing authority: FCC
- Facility ID: 4675
- Class: A
- ERP: 6,000 watts
- HAAT: 100 meters (330 ft)
- Transmitter coordinates: 39°3′56″N 78°22′58″W

Links
- Public license information: Public file; LMS
- Webcast: Listen live (via iHeartRadio)
- Website: 993thefox.iheart.com

WFQX (99.3 MHz) is a classic rock formatted broadcast radio station licensed to Front Royal, Virginia, serving the Northern Shenandoah Valley. WFQX is owned and operated by iHeartMedia.
