= Morris Siegel =

American sportswriter (1915–1994)

Morris Siegel (October 13, 1915 – June 2, 1994) was an American sportswriter who covered sports in Washington, D.C., from the 1940s to 1990s.

== Early life ==
Siegel was born on October 13, 1915, in Atlanta. He attended Emory University, but left in 1938 after about three years of study. He got his start in the newspaper business as a copy boy and began his career as a writer with The Atlanta Constitution. He later moved to the Richmond Times-Dispatch. During World War II he served in the United States Navy.

== Career in D.C. ==
In September 1946, Siegel joined The Washington Post. He also worked for three of the city’s television stations as sports anchor and in radio. He did color broadcasting for the Washington Redskins in the 1950s and 1960s and was the announcer for Capitol Wrestling Corporation's (forerunner to the WWE) Heavyweight Wrestling From Washington from 1956 to 1958.

Siegel left The Post for The Washington Daily News. After the paper folded, Siegel worked for The Washington Star until that paper folded in 1981. He then worked as a TV and radio commentator and was consultant for the D.C. Baseball Commission, which sought to have Major League Baseball return to the city. In 1983 he began writing for Regardie's. From October 1986 until his death June 2, 1994, Siegel wrote for The Washington Times.

== Personal life ==
From 1964 to 1985, Siegel was married to writer Myra MacPherson. They had two children, Michael Siegel, a political communications director, and Leah Siegel, who was a Dallas bureau producer for ESPN. On November 11, 1985, Siegel suffered a heart attack. In 1989 he was diagnosed with colon cancer. His health began to decline by 1992, but he continued to work, frequently receiving chemotherapy treatments at out-of-town hospitals while on assignment. On April 22, 1994, he covered the Michael Moorer-Evander Holyfield fight in Las Vegas. On May 18, 1994, his final column appeared in The Washington Times. Siegel died on June 2, 1994, of cancer at George Washington University Hospital.

== Legacy ==
Siegal was inducted into the Washington Hall of Stars at RFK Stadium. was a finalist for the J. G. Taylor Spink Award in the 2007 Baseball Hall of Fame balloting. He finished second in the balloting to Rick Hummel, 223 votes to 112 (Nick Peters received the remaining 66 votes).
