= Bill Malone (broadcaster) =

American television and radio personality (1924–1973)

William Malone Polglase (June 20, 1924 – March 8, 1973) was an American television and radio personality who worked for WMAL/WMAL-TV in Washington, D.C., and was the first host of Supermarket Sweep.

== Early life ==
Malone was born on June 20, 1924, in Brooklyn. He graduated from Brooklyn Preparatory School, where he played football, baseball, and hockey. He attended the College of the Holy Cross for one year before leaving in 1942 to join the United States Navy as a Cadet in the Naval Service Training Command. After his active duty ended, Malone remained in the United States Navy Reserve as a jet pilot. In 1950, while piloting a two-seater Stinson, he made an emergency landing on the Wilbur Cross Parkway in North Haven, Connecticut.

== Broadcasting career ==
=== Radio ===
At the end of World War II, Malone resumed his education at Fordham University, where majored in business administration. He was a member of the school's football team, but quit after his freshman year. He then worked at the school's radio station, WFUV-FM, as a football play-by-play announcer and staff announcer. After graduating, Malone joined WAVE in Louisville, Kentucky. After six months, Malone left for WMAL, where he worked as an evening DJ and quiz show host. From 1953 to 1954, he was the color commentator for the Washington Redskins radio/television simulcasts. In 1957 he succeeded Jim Gibbons as WMAL’s morning host.

=== Television ===
Malone was the longtime evening sports anchor WMAL-TV. He also hosted a number of programs for the station, including Heavyweight Wrestling, Bandstand Matinee Club, Town & Country Matinee, and Ladies' Home Theater, as well as special events, such as the Cherry Blossom Festival and the President's Cup Regatta.

In 1960, Malone moved to New York City to do freelance radio and television work. He was announcer for Texaco, the Falstaff Brewing Corporation, The Travelers Companies, and Tareyton and appeared in on-camera advertising segments during Gunsmoke, The George Gobel Show, Bachelor Father, and The Bell Telephone Hour.

Malone hosted Supermarket Sweep, which was broadcast nationally on ABC from December 20, 1965 to July 14, 1967.

== Later life ==
In 1972, Malone left broadcasting to become a senior vice president for Lawrence Dobrow and Associates, a Washington, D.C. based public relations and advertising firm.

On March 8, 1973, Malone was killed when the vehicle he was driving struck an overturned Greyhound bus on the New Jersey Turnpike in Woolwich Township, New Jersey.
