= WBHB (FM) =

Active rock radio station in Mercersburg, Pennsylvania

- Mercersburg, Pennsylvania; United States
- Broadcast area: Hagerstown metropolitan area
- Frequency: 92.1 MHz
- RDS: PI: 5803; PS: 92.1 Bob Rocks; RT: Title by Artist on 92.1 Bob Rocks
- Branding: 92-1 Bob Rocks

Programming
- Language: English
- Format: Active rock
- Affiliations: United Stations Radio Networks

Ownership
- Owner: Manning Broadcasting, Inc.; (HJV Limited Partnership)
- Sister stations: WAYZ; WIKG

History
- First air date: March 22, 1976
- Former call signs: WRCV (1976–1983); WGLL (1983–1993); WSRT (1993–2005); WPPT (2005–2012); WNUZ (2012–2019); WIKG (2019–2025)
- Call sign meaning: Similar to "Bob"

Technical information
- Licensing authority: FCC
- Facility ID: 39495
- Class: A
- ERP: 4,000 watts
- HAAT: 90 meters (300 ft)
- Transmitter coordinates: 39°48′37″N 77°48′22.1″W

Links
- Public license information: Public file; LMS
- Webcast: Listen live
- Website: www.thebobrocks.com

WBHB (92.1 MHz) is a commercial radio station licensed to Mercersburg, Pennsylvania, serving the Hagerstown metropolitan area.

== History ==
The station went on the air as WRCV on March 22, 1976.

On August 1, 1983, the call sign was changed to WGLL, and the station adopted a oldies format as 92.1 Gold.

On October 4, 1993, the call sign was changed to WSRT, and the station adopted a hot adult contemporary format as Star 92.1.

On February 28, 2005, at noon, the call sign was changed to WPPT, and the station adopted a contemporary hit radio format as 92-1 The Point.

On March 5, 2012, WPPT changed their format from classic country back to Top 40/CHR, branded as "Now 92-1", and changed its call sign to WNUZ.

On November 18, 2016, WNUZ rebranded as "92-1 Hits FM".

On September 27, 2019, the station dropped the CHR format again, and began stunting with Christmas music. On September 30, the station changed its call sign to WIKG, and switched to classic hits as "92-1 The Goat".

On October 7, 2024, WIKG changed their format from classic hits to sports, still under the "92-1 The Goat" branding.

In August 2025, WIKG began simulcasting with sister station WLIN (1380 AM). On September 1, 2025, WIKG began simulcasting with sister station WBHB-FM 101.5. The active rock format was simulcast on both frequencies until September 15, 2025, when the active rock format was permanently moved to the 92.1 frequency, forming 92-1 Bob Rocks. On October 1, 2025, the call sign for 92.1 officially became WBHB.

In October of 2026, Manning Broadcasting, Inc. purchased VerStandig Media, along with the FCC licenses for WAYZ, WBHB, and WIKG
