= WLNI =

- Lynchburg, Virginia; United States
- Broadcast area: Lynchburg metropolitan area
- Frequency: 105.9 MHz
- Branding: News/Talk WLNI

Programming
- Format: Talk
- Affiliations: Fox News Radio

Ownership
- Owner: James River Media, LLC

History
- First air date: February 2, 1994
- Call sign meaning: Former "Line" branding

Technical information
- Licensing authority: FCC
- Facility ID: 22663
- Class: A
- Power: 6,000 watts
- HAAT: 81 meters (266 ft)
- Transmitter coordinates: 37°25′37.0″N 79°7′26.0″W

Links
- Public license information: Public file; LMS
- Webcast: Listen live
- Website: wlni.com

WLNI (105.9 FM) is a commercial radio station licensed to Lynchburg, Virginia, United States. It has a talk format and is owned by James River Media, LLC. The WLNI studios are located on Tradewynd Drive in Lynchburg and the transmitter is off Main Street, near the Lynchburg Expressway.

== History ==
WLNI signed on the air on February 2, 1994. It was Lynchburg’s first full-time talk station on the FM dial and was owned by the Friendship Broadcasting Company. The studios were on Amhurst Highway in Madison Heights. WLNI was a network affiliate of Westwood One and ABC News Radio.

In 1998, Three Daughters Media acquired WLNI, keeping the studios in Madison Heights. In 2004, the station was purchased by North Carolina–based Centennial Broadcasting and the studios were relocated to Midtown Lynchburg near the Plaza Shopping Center.

In 2013, Roanoke-based Mel Wheeler Broadcasting purchased WLNI to join its eight-station group. The studios were moved to the current location in the community of Wyndhurst.

James River Media, based in Lynchburg, purchased WLNI in August 2020. It became a stand-alone station. James River Media re-focused WLNI on Lynchburg-area news and issues.

WLNI has received several awards from the Virginia Association of Broadcasters for its news coverage and programming over the years, including:

- 2012 Best Human Interest Series for “Living History: the Civil War in Central Virginia”
- 2010 Best Human Interest Series: “Surviving Summer with Your Kids”
- 2010 Best Documentary: "Camille Remembered"
- 2009 and 2010: Best Morning Show: "The Morning Line with Mari White and Brian Weigand"

== Programming ==
Local personalities on WLNI included Mari White, Brian Weigand, Rich Roth and Dennis Carter. WLNI also carries Virginia Tech Hokies football and basketball.
