= WMRE =

- Charles Town, West Virginia; United States
- Broadcast area: Eastern Panhandle of West Virginia; Northern Shenandoah Valley; Northern Virginia
- Frequency: 1550 kHz
- Branding: Fox Sports 1550

Programming
- Language: English
- Format: Sports radio
- Network: Fox Sports Radio
- Affiliations: iHeartRadio

Ownership
- Owner: iHeartMedia; (iHM Licenses, LLC)
- Sister stations: W239BV; WFQX; WKSI-FM; WUSQ-FM

History
- First air date: May 28, 1962
- Former call signs: WXVA (1962–1997)
- Call sign meaning: "Memories" (former branding)

Technical information
- Licensing authority: FCC
- Facility ID: 27003
- Class: D
- Power: 5,000 watts (daytime); 6 watts (nighttime)
- Transmitter coordinates: 39°16′23.0″N 77°51′56.0″W

Links
- Public license information: Public file; LMS
- Webcast: Listen live (via iHeartRadio)
- Website: foxsports1550.iheart.com

WMRE (1550 kHz) is a commercial AM sports radio formatted broadcast radio station licensed to Charles Town, West Virginia, serving Charles Town and Jefferson County, West Virginia. WMRE is owned and operated by iHeartMedia.

While the station is licensed to Charles Town, West Virginia, where the station's tower is also located, the station is run from the iHeartMedia studios in Winchester, Virginia. By day, WMRE is powered at 5,000 watts, using a non-directional antenna. Because 1550 AM is a Canadian clear channel frequency reserved for Class A station CBEF in Windsor, Ontario, WMRE must reduce power at night to 6 watts.
