= What Not to Wear =

What Not to Wear may refer to:

- What Not to Wear (British TV series), British makeover reality television series
- What Not to Wear (American TV series), American makeover reality television series

== See also ==
- Esquadrão da Moda, the Brazilian version of the show, airing on Sistema Brasileiro de Televisão
- Ma come ti vesti?!, the Italian version of the show, airing on Real Time
- Snimite eto nemedlenno (Снимите это немедленно, literally Take it off immediately), the Russian version of the show, airing on STS
