= WUSQ-FM =

Country music radio station in Winchester, Virginia

- Winchester, Virginia; United States
- Broadcast area: Winchester metropolitan area
- Frequency: 102.5 MHz
- RDS: PI: 1b5c; PS: Shenandoah Country Q102 Title Artist; RT: Shenandoah Country Q102 Title Artist
- Branding: Q102

Programming
- Format: Country music

Ownership
- Owner: iHeartMedia; (iHM Licenses, LLC)
- Sister stations: W239BV; WKSI-FM; WFQX; WMRE

History
- First air date: December 10, 1965
- Former call signs: WHPL-FM (1965–1969); WEFG (1969–1982); WUSQ (1982–1986)
- Call sign meaning: United States Q

Technical information
- Licensing authority: FCC
- Facility ID: 74160
- Class: B
- ERP: 32,000 watts
- HAAT: 192 meters (630 ft)
- Transmitter coordinates: 39°10′38.0″N 78°15′53.0″W

Links
- Public license information: Public file; LMS
- Webcast: Listen live (via iHeartRadio)
- Website: shenandoahcountryq102.iheart.com

WUSQ-FM (102.5 MHz, "Q102") is a country music formatted radio station licensed to Winchester, Virginia, serving the Winchester metropolitan area. WUSQ-FM is owned and operated by iHeartMedia.

== History ==
=== Launch and early years (1965–1980s) ===
The station first signed on the air on December 10, 1965, as WHPL-FM. It was founded by Edwin Fisher's Shenval Broadcasting Corporation as a companion to the local AM station WHPL (610 AM). Unlike many AM/FM pairings of the era that simply simulcast AM audio, WHPL-FM was programmed independently from its inception. The call letters changed to WEFG in 1969. In 1982, Arthur H. Holt purchased the stations, and the FM station adopted the WUSQ call letters.

=== Transition to "Q102" and corporate ownership (1990s–present) ===
Benchmark Communications acquired the station in 1991. In 1997, Benchmark sold its holdings to Capstar Broadcasting, which eventually merged into AMFM Inc. (1999) and ultimately Clear Channel Communications (now iHeartMedia). Operating under the "Q102" brand, the station established itself as the flagship country music outlet for the Shenandoah Valley and Northern Virginia area.

Today, WUSQ-FM airs a mix of current country hits and classic favorites alongside syndicated regional and national programming, such as the Chris and Lori Show in the mornings.
