= Fisher, West Virginia =

Unincorporated community in West Virginia, United States

- Unincorporated community
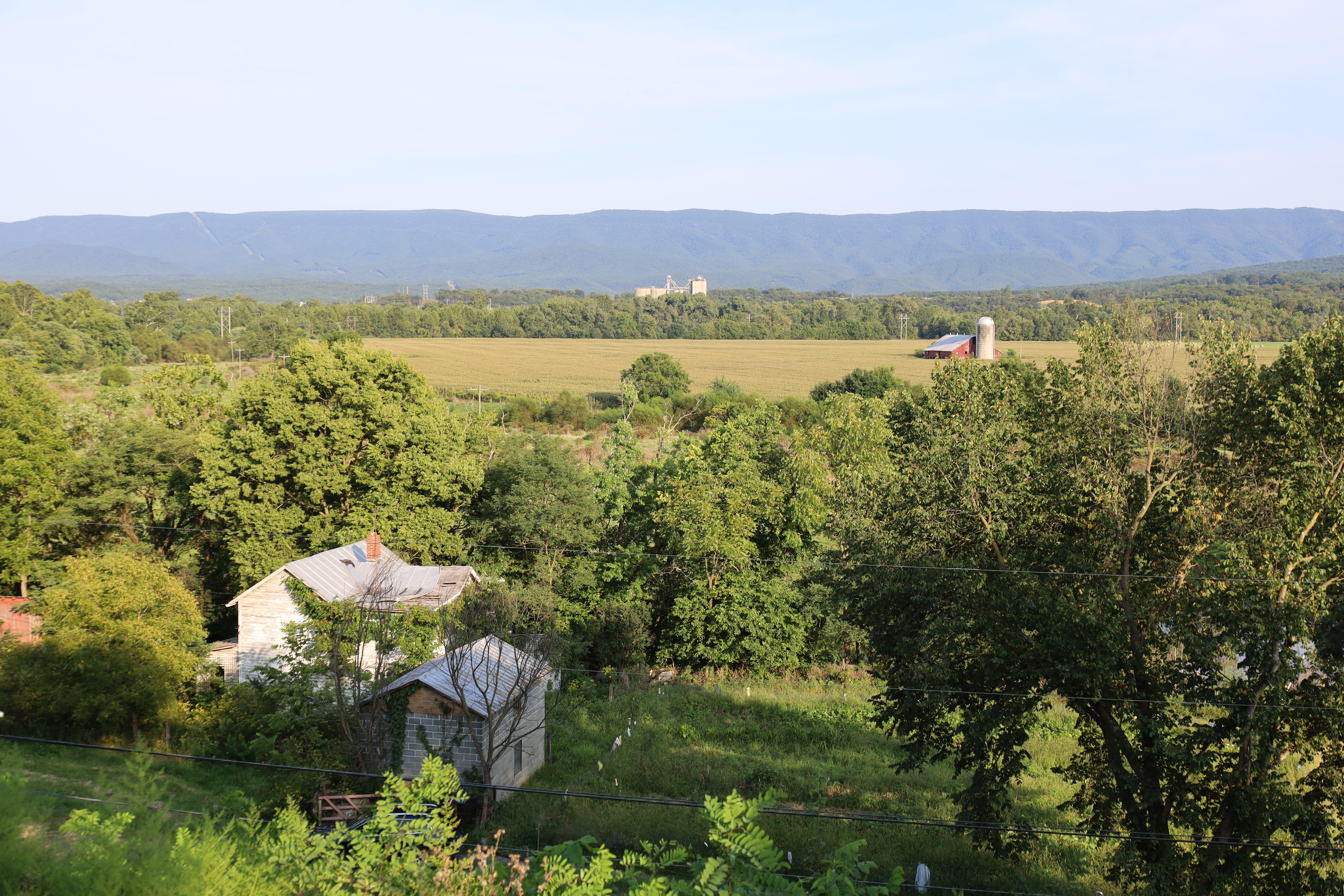

- Location within West Virginia Location within the United States
- Coordinates: 39°3′5″N 79°0′12″W
- Country: United States
- State: West Virginia
- County: Hardy
- Time zone: UTC-5 (Eastern (EST))
  - Summer (DST): UTC-4 (EDT)
- ZIP codes: 26818
- GNIS feature ID: 1554456

Fisher is an unincorporated community on the South Branch Potomac River in Hardy County, West Virginia, United States. It lies west of Moorefield. The precise origin of its name is unclear. It may be named generally for the Fisher family that lived in its vicinity, or more specifically for George Fisher, whose family lived on the South Branch approximately one mile due south of Fisher.
