= WAYZ =

Coordinates: 39.829°N 77.552°W

- Waynesboro, Pennsylvania; United States
- Broadcast area: Hagerstown metropolitan area
- Frequency: 101.5 MHz
- RDS: PI: 5731; PS: 101.5 New Country WAYZ; RT: Title by Artist on New Country WAYZ
- Branding: 101-5 New Country WAYZ

Programming
- Format: Country music

Ownership
- Owner: VerStandig Media; (Manning Broadcasting, Inc.)
- Sister stations: WBHB; WIKG

History
- First air date: 1959
- Former call signs: WAYZ-FM (1959–2000); WWMD (2000–2005); WEEG (2005); WFYN (2005–2009); WBHB-FM (2009–2025)
- Call sign meaning: Waynesboro

Technical information
- Licensing authority: FCC
- Facility ID: 27401
- Class: B
- ERP: 50,000 watts (horizontal); 48,000 watts (vertical)
- HAAT: 70 meters (230 ft)

Links
- Public license information: Public file; LMS
- Webcast: Listen live
- Website: www.wayz.com

WAYZ (101.5 MHz) is a country music formatted broadcast commercial radio station licensed to Waynesboro, Pennsylvania, serving the "Four-State" area (Maryland, Pennsylvania, Virginia and West Virginia). WAYZ is owned and operated by Manning Broadcasting, Inc.

== History ==
Beginning in the late 1970s, WAYZ-FM was a country-formatted station. VerStandig bought Hagerstown, Maryland–based WWMD (104.7 FM) from John Staub (Hagerstown Broadcasting) and moved the WAYZ country format there in 2000, with the WWMD call sign moving to 101.5; it broadcast an audio CNN Headline News format for three weeks.

Top 40 "Magic 101-5" debuted in October 2000, and operated until February 27, 2005. This returned the format for the first time since WIKZ changed to adult contemporary in 1992.

On February 27 of that year, Hagerstown-based WARX flipped to classic hits as "106-9 The Eagle", a few hours before Verstandig flipped WWMD to classic rock as "Eagle 101-5" with the callsign WEEG. After a few days of dueling "Eagle"s, WWMD ceded the branding, briefly going with "The New 101.5". The following week, it became "Classic Rock 101-5" with the callsign WFYN. Local media observers noted the similarity of the new call sign, which had no obvious meaning, to a profane insult ("fuck you, Nassau") over the branding conflict.

On September 17, 2007, WFYN flipped from classic rock to active rock as Rock 101-5. On March 16, 2009, WFYN became WBHB-FM and changed its Rock 101-5 branding to 101-5 Bob Rocks; it continued to broadcast an active rock format.

The Bob format and WBHB call sign moved to the 92.1 frequency in September 2025, making way for the WAYZ format to return from 104.7 in Hagerstown, which Verstandig Media sold to Brighter Media Group.

In October of 2026, Manning Broadcasting, Inc. purchased VerStandig Media, along with the FCC licenses for WAYZ, WBHB, and WIKG
