= WFVA =

- Fredericksburg, Virginia; United States
- Broadcast area: Metro Fredericksburg
- Frequency: 1230 kHz
- Branding: NewsTalk 1230 WFVA

Programming
- Format: Talk
- Affiliations: ABC News Radio; Fox News Radio; Premiere Networks; Salem Radio Network; Westwood One; The Weather Channel

Ownership
- Owner: Centennial Broadcasting; (Centennial Licensing II, LLC)
- Sister stations: WGRQ, WBQB, WGRX

History
- First air date: September 8, 1939
- Former frequencies: 1260 kHz (1939–1945)
- Call sign meaning: Fredericksburg, Virginia

Technical information
- Licensing authority: FCC
- Facility ID: 41813
- Class: C
- Power: 1,000 watts unlimited
- Transmitter coordinates: 38°16′50.0″N 77°26′11.0″W

Links
- Public license information: Public file; LMS
- Webcast: WFVA Webstream
- Website: newstalk1230.net

WFVA (1230 AM) is a commercial radio station in Fredericksburg, Virginia. WFVA is owned and operated by Centennial Broadcasting. It airs a talk radio format. The studios, offices and transmitter are on Mimosa Street in Fredericksburg. The call sign stands for Fredericksburg, Virginia. It has kept the same call letters for its eight decades of broadcasting.

The station has a local talk and information show in weekday morning drive time. The rest of the day is made up of nationally syndicated talk shows from Glenn Beck, Michael Savage, Laura Ingraham, Mark Levin, John Batchelor, Coast to Coast AM with George Noory, and This Morning, America's First News with Gordon Deal. Most hours begin with ABC News Radio.

WFVA was scheduled to broadcast all Fredericksburg Nationals baseball games in the 2020 baseball season before the season was cancelled due to the COVID-19 pandemic.

== History ==
On September 8, 1939, WFVA first signed on. It was originally owned by the Fredericksburg Broadcasting Company. The station was powered at 250 watts and broadcast at 1260 kHz. It was the first radio station in Fredericksburg.

By the late 1940s, it had moved to its current dial position, 1230 kHz. It was a network affiliate of ABC.

In the 1950s, Richard Field Lewis Jr. bought 60% and added it to his Richard Field Lewis Jr. Stations network.

In 1960, it signed on an FM radio station at 101.5 MHz, WFVA-FM. Now known as WBQB, it is still WFVA's sister station.

Through the 1960s, 1970s and 1980s, WFVA carried a full service format, airing middle of the road music, news and talk. By the 1990s, it transitioned to a full-time talk format, airing shows from the ABC Talkradio Network. WFVA is still affiliated with ABC News Radio.
