= WAIW (FM) =

- Winchester, Virginia; United States
- Broadcast area: Winchester metropolitan area
- Frequency: 92.5 MHz
- Branding: Air1

Programming
- Language: English
- Format: Contemporary worship music
- Network: Air1

Ownership
- Owner: Educational Media Foundation
- Sister stations: WLVW; WLZV; WTCF

History
- First air date: November 18, 1946
- Former call signs: WINC-FM (1946–1949); WRFL (1949–1979); WQUS (1979–1981); WINC-FM (1981–2020); WLWX (2020–2021)
- Call sign meaning: Air1 Washington

Technical information
- Licensing authority: FCC
- Facility ID: 41810
- Class: B
- ERP: 22,000 watts
- HAAT: 434 meters (1,424 ft)
- Transmitter coordinates: 38°57′21.3″N 78°1′26.9″W

Links
- Public license information: Public file; LMS
- Webcast: Listen live (via TuneIn)
- Website: www.air1.com

WAIW is a contemporary worship music formatted broadcast radio station licensed to Winchester, Virginia. WAIW is owned and operated by Educational Media Foundation.

== Coverage area ==
With the station's transmitter located atop a mountain, WAIW's signal can be heard throughout the Shenandoah Valley, Central and Northern Virginia, the Eastern Panhandle and Potomac Highlands of West Virginia, parts of Central and Western Maryland and the Washington metropolitan area.

== History ==
Former owner Centennial Broadcasting filed an agreement with the Federal Communications Commission (FCC) on October 6, 2020, to sell the former WINC-FM to Educational Media Foundation (EMF) for $1.75 million. WINC-FM's existing music programming moved to the co-owned WXBN (105.5 FM) and WZFC (104.9 FM) ahead of the sale; Centennial also retained the rights to the WINC callsign and branding. On November 18, EMF filed to operate WINC-FM as a non-commercial station upon closing.

The sale closed on December 29. At 2:37 p.m. that same day, WINC-FM abruptly signed off and around an hour later, at 3:29 p.m., the station signed back on IDing with the callsign WLWX and airing EMF's Air1 network. Sister station WAIW in Wheaton, Illinois, and WLWX "traded" callsigns on January 11, 2021. The application to operate the station as non-commercial was approved one day later.
