= WVRX =

Simulcast of WVRS, Gore, Virginia
- Strasburg, Virginia; United States
- Broadcast area: Northern Shenandoah Valley
- Frequency: 104.9 MHz
- Branding: Classic Southern Gospel Music

Programming
- Language: English
- Format: Southern gospel

Ownership
- Owner: Point FM Ministries; (Point FM Ministries, Inc.)
- Sister stations: WVRS

History
- First air date: November 4, 1986
- Former call signs: WESI (1986–1992); WBPP (1992–2002); WWRT (2002–2009); WXBN (2009–2011); WZFC (2011–2021); WKDV-FM (2021–2022)

Technical information
- Licensing authority: FCC
- Facility ID: 60362
- Class: A
- ERP: 4,100 watts
- HAAT: 65.7 meters (216 ft)
- Transmitter coordinates: 39°1′6.4″N 78°25′34″W

Links
- Public license information: Public file; LMS
- Webcast: Listen live
- Website: southernlight.fm

WVRX (104.9 FM) is a southern gospel formatted broadcast radio station licensed to Strasburg, Virginia, serving the Northern Shenandoah Valley. WVRX is owned by Point FM Ministries. WVRX simulcasts sister station WVRS.

== History ==
On January 31, 2018, the then-WZFC changed their format from classic country to a simulcast of sister news/talk station WINC (1400 AM) in nearby Winchester.

On November 17, 2020, both WZFC and sister station WXBN (105.5 FM) became a simulcast of WINC-FM 92.5 and its hot adult contemporary format. WINC-FM's programming was migrated to the two stations in anticipation of the sale of the 92.5 FM signal to the Educational Media Foundation. Upon the sale of the 92.5 FM signal to EMF, Centennial transferred the WINC-FM call letters to 105.5 FM.

On April 30, 2021, Centennial Broadcasting announced it was selling WINC-FM and WZFC to Fairfax, Virginia-based Metro Radio, Inc. for $225,000. WINC AM was not included in the sale. Allen B. Shaw, Centennial's President and CEO, said in a May 2021 interview with The Winchester Star that Metro Radio, Inc. had assured Shaw "they do not intend to" change the format of WINC-FM and WZFC. Shaw further said Metro thought WINC-FM's format was "probably the best format for the Winchester market" for ad revenue.

On June 30, coincident with the consummation of the sale to Metro Radio, long-time morning show host Barry Lee signed off after 37 years at the station. Hours later, long-time afternoon host Paula Kidwell would also sign off. The same day, the callsign was changed from WZFC to WKDV-FM to match new sister station WKDV, licensed to Manassas.

On September 30, just three months after Metro Radio purchased the station, Metro entered into an agreement to sell WKDV-FM to Point FM Ministries for $125,000. Point FM Ministries owns locally based, southern gospel-formatted WVRS. Metro Radio retained WINC-FM. The sale was consummated on December 17, 2021. On January 13, 2022, the station changed its call sign to WVRX, and the station changed its programming to a simulcast of WVRS.
