= WBQB =

- Fredericksburg, Virginia; United States
- Broadcast area: Central Virginia
- Frequency: 101.5 MHz
- Branding: B101.5

Programming
- Format: Hot adult contemporary

Ownership
- Owner: Centennial Broadcasting; (Centennial Licensing II, LLC)
- Sister stations: WFVA

History
- First air date: May 15, 1960
- Former call signs: WFVA-FM (1960–1989)

Technical information
- Licensing authority: FCC
- Facility ID: 41812
- Class: B
- ERP: 50,000 watts
- HAAT: 150 meters (490 ft)
- Transmitter coordinates: 38°19′57.5″N 77°23′39.9″W

Links
- Public license information: Public file; LMS
- Webcast: Listen live
- Website: www.b1015.com

WBQB (101.5 FM, "B101.5") is a hot adult contemporary–formatted radio station based in Fredericksburg, Virginia. This stations signal reaches from Washington D.C to Richmond, Virginia and from Southern Maryland west towards Manassas, Virginia. The station primarily serves Fredericksburg, Spotsylvania County and Stafford County. WBQB is owned and operated by Centennial Broadcasting. The studio and offices are located on Mimosa Street in Fredericksburg.

== History ==
On May 15, 1960, AM radio station WFVA signed on WFVA-FM as an FM sister station simulcasting the same programming. Both stations were owned by Mid-Atlantic Network Inc.

On August 7, 1989, WFVA was authorized by the FCC to change its callsign to WBQB. The change in call sign coincided with the breaking of a years-long simulcast on the FM frequency and the reformatting of the renamed WBQB to be less of a full-service middle-of-the-road station and target the 25–44 age group. The adult contemporary format was tweaked in 1992 to reduce the classic rock component.

On May 17, 2007, it was announced that Mid-Atlantic Network Inc. would sell six radio stations to Centennial Licensing II LLC for $36 million.

== Programming ==
WBQB broadcasts a hot adult contemporary music format. As of July 2023, weekday on-air personalities include Jeremy Grey in the morning, Kristin Nash in the afternoon, The Drive Home with Trapper Young, and Bill Carroll at night. Primary marketing focus is on female listeners and demographic as an audience.

Among the recurring segments on WBQB every week: 101 Minutes of Today's BEST Music a one hundred and one minute commercial free segment during Kristin Nash's timeslot, Kristin's Canines and Kittens featuring animals from the Fredericksburg SPCA, and the 5 O'Clock Cartunes.

== Community activity ==
B101.5 participates in multiple community events within Fredericksburg throughout the year. It participates as the primary sponsor for the Great Train Race, one of the largest annual youth 1-mile races on the East Coast. The race has been held in Fredericksburg for almost 30 years. The station also participates in the annual Spotsylvania Stars and Stripes Spectacular for the Fourth of July, where it provides the music for the fireworks show at the end of the event.
