= WINC-FM =

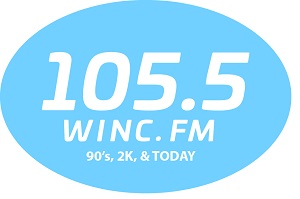
- Berryville, Virginia; United States
- Broadcast area: Winchester metropolitan area
- Frequency: 105.5 MHz
- Branding: 105.5 WINC-FM; (pronounced "Wink FM")

Programming
- Language: English
- Format: Hot adult contemporary
- Affiliations: Baltimore Orioles; Christendom College; Compass Media Networks; Shenandoah Hornets; SRN News; Virginia Cavaliers; Washington Wizards; Westwood One Sports

Ownership
- Owner: Darrin Jones; (Euclid Avenue Properties, LLC)

History
- First air date: August 13, 1979
- Former call signs: WWOO (1979–1987); WAPP (1987–2002); WWRE (2002–2009); WXNB (2009–2011); WXBN (2011–2020)
- Call sign meaning: Winchester

Technical information
- Licensing authority: FCC
- Facility ID: 60363
- Class: A
- ERP: 3,000 watts
- HAAT: 91 meters (299 ft)
- Transmitter coordinates: 39°7′3.4″N 77°58′20″W

Links
- Public license information: Public file; LMS
- Webcast: Listen live; Listen live (via iHeartRadio)
- Website: talkwinchester.com/winc-fm/

WINC-FM (105.5 MHz) is a hot adult contemporary-formatted commercial radio station licensed to Berryville, Virginia, serving the Winchester metropolitan area. WINC-FM is owned by Darrin Jones, through Euclid Avenue Properties, LLC.

== History ==
In November 2020, the then-WXBN flipped to hot adult contemporary, assuming the hot adult contemporary format and "WINC-FM" (pronounced "Wink FM") branding previously heard on the Winchester-based 92.5 frequency (which was in the process of being sold to the Educational Media Foundation). The station would take over the WINC-FM legacy callsign on December 29, 2020.

On April 30, 2021, Centennial Broadcasting announced it was selling WINC-FM and sister station WZFC to Fairfax, Virginia-based Metro Radio, Inc. for $225,000. Fellow sister station WINC was not included in the sale. Allen B. Shaw, Centennial's president and CEO, said in a May 2021 interview with The Winchester Star that Metro Radio, Inc. had had insured Shaw "they do not intend to" change the format of WINC-FM and WZFC. Shaw further said Metro thought WZFC's format was "probably the best format for the Winchester market" for ad revenue.

On June 30, long-time morning show host Barry Lee signed off after 37 years at the station. Hours later, long-time afternoon host Paula Kidwell would also sign off. The sale of WINC-FM and WZFC (renamed WKDV-FM) was completed the same day.

WINC-FM was acquired by funeral home operator Darrin Jones, through his Euclid Avenue Properties, effective December 12, 2022. Following the sale's completion, on December 16, 2022, WINC-FM began stunting with Christmas music, ahead of an announcement to be made on January 5, 2023, at 10:55 am. At that time, the station relaunched its hot adult contemporary format from a new Winchester studio; Metro Radio had operated the station from Fairfax, with the intent of serving Leesburg. WINC-FM is operated in conjunction with its former AM sister station, which had been sold in the interim to Todd Bartley's Colonial Radio Group of Williamsport and renamed WZFC; the arrangement saw the AM station reclaim its former WINC call sign.
