= Dunlap Creek =

Dunlap Creek may refer to:

- Dunlap Creek (Tuscarawas River), a stream in Ohio
- Dunlap Creek (Duck River), a stream in Tennessee
- Dunlap Creek (Virginia), a stream
