= Covington Historic District =

Covington Historic District may refer to:

- Covington Historic District (Covington, Georgia), listed on the NRHP in Georgia
- Covington Mills and Mill Village Historic District, Covington, Georgia, listed on the NRHP in Georgia
- North Covington Historic District, Covington, Georgia, listed on the NRHP in Georgia
- Covington Downtown Commercial Historic District, Covington, Kentucky, listed on the NRHP in Kentucky
- Division of St. John Historic District, Covington, Louisiana, also known as "Covington Historic District", NRHP-listed in St. Tammany Parish
- Covington Historic District (Covington, Virginia), listed on the NRHP in Virginia
