= Thomas Mancuso =

American physician and scientist (1912–2004)

- Born: February 19, 1912; New York City, US
- Died: July 4, 2004 (aged 92); Oakland, California, US
- Occupation: Professor of occupational medicine
- Known for: Long-term studies of effects of cancer-causing effects of several chemicals and low level radiation in industry

Academic background
- Education: Creighton University
- Influences: Wilhelm Hueper

Academic work
- Discipline: Industrial medicine
- Institutions: Michigan State Department of Health (1942–1943); Oregon State Board of Health (1943–1945); Ohio Department of Health (1945–1962); University of Pittsburgh (1962–1982)

Thomas F. Mancuso (February 19, 1912 – July 4, 2004) was an American epidemiologist and professor of occupational health at the University of Pittsburgh's School of Public Health between 1962 and 1982, known for conducting long-term studies of the cancer-causing effects of low-level radiation and several chemicals used in industry, including asbestos. He is credited for being the first to understand that beryllium and chromium could cause cancer.

During World War II, Mancuso co-founded organizations in public health, at health departments of Michigan and Oregon. After the war he headed the Department of Industrial Hygiene at the Ohio Department of Health. There, he produced the first American long-term mortality studies and showed how social security data could be used to understand deaths among factory workers.

== Early life and education ==
Thomas Francis Mancuso was born in Kings County Hospital, Brooklyn, New York, on February 19, 1912. He attended Creighton University in Omaha, from where he received his bachelor's degree followed by his medical degree from its medical school in 1937.

== Early career ==
=== World War II ===
During World War II, Mancuso co-founded organizations in public health. From 1942 to 1943, he was physician of industrial hygiene for the Michigan State Department of Health. He subsequently directed the Division of Industrial Medicine at the Oregon State Board of Health, and served it until 1945.

=== Ohio Department of Health ===
Between 1945 and 1962, Mancuso headed the Department of Industrial Hygiene at the Ohio Department of Health. There he was influenced by National Cancer Institute's Wilhelm Hueper, and produced the first American long-term mortality studies on occupational groups, using social security data. During his time at Ohio, he showed cancer-causing effects of several chemicals including aromatic amines, cadmium, hydrogen sulphide, manganese, and mercury.

One of his 1950s contracts, with the Philip Carey Manufacturing Company, was to study the occupational risk of asbestos. After reporting that asbestos was harmful to both employees and customers, his contract was terminated. As a result of his work, warning labels were added to asbestos insulation.

== Career at the University of Pittsburgh ==
In 1962 Mancuso joined the University of Pittsburgh's School of Public Health as research professor of occupational health, and remained there until his retirement in 1982.

=== Hanford ===
In 1964, the Division of Biology and medicine of the Atomic Energy Commission (AEC) asked Mancuso of the possibility of long-term effects of low levels of ionising radiation. The following year they granted him a five-year contract to investigate the effects of low-level radiation on half a million workers employed in a nuclear weapons plant. This he felt could only be done by long-term follow-up; by looking at old records and following the group of people through to death to find out what they died from. When in 1974 the AEC asked Mancuso to dispute findings that low-level radiation did not cause cancer, Mancuso refused, and his contract was later terminated. He took to independent research with epidemiologist Alice Stewart and mathematician George Kneale. In 1977 they revealed that Hanford Nuclear Weapons Plant employees were "dying of cancer from cumulative radiation exposures far below the standards established as safe". In response, in 2000 the US Government agreed to offer compensation to those affected.

=== Beryllium ===
In 1970, Mancuso published his study that concluded that beryllium-associated pneumonitis and bronchitis was related to subsequent development of lung cancer. This is generally considered the first recognition of a link between beryllium and cancer. Ten years later, he confirmed his findings in a follow-up study.

=== Viscose ===
In a 1972 paper, Mancuso had traced employment records from 1938 at the Industrial Rayon Corporation, to study neuropsychiatric effects of carbon disulfide, used in producing viscose. He found a likely under-reporting of deaths by suicide, including one where the wife was murdered prior to suicide. Later, the National Institute for Occupational Safety and Health hired him to expand on the study to include the deaths from heart disease. The result was a long paper titled "Epidemiological study of workers employed in the viscose rayon industry". In it he demonstrated the risk from coronary heart disease among those employed in the rayon industry increased by 40% in those employed for more than ten years.

=== International Association of Machinists ===
In 1974 Mancuso was a consultant for the International Association of Machinists and Aerospace Workers, and gave its members advice on how to keep themselves safe from occupational hazards. This he did via questions and answers in the organization's newsletter, the Machinist. In 1976 he collated the previous two years of advice and published them in a book titled Help for the working wounded.

== Later life ==
Mancuso continued to investigate occupational hazards after his retirement. He is credited as the first to understand a link between chromium and cancer. His 1997 paper based on the follow-up of 332 chromate production workers hired at the same industrial plant from 1931 to 1993, concluded that all types of chromium were carcinogenic.

== Honors and awards ==
In 1961 the National Cancer Institute awarded Mancuso a career award.

== Death ==
Mancuso died from oesophageal cancer on July 4, 2004, in Oakland, California. He was survived by his wife Rafaella, two daughters and one son.

== Selected publications ==
=== Books ===
- Mancuso, Thomas F. (1976). Help for the working wounded. [Washington : International Association of Machinists and Aerospace Workers].

=== Articles ===
- Mancuso, Thomas F.; Coulter, Elizabeth J. (February 1963). "Methodology in Industrial Health Studies: The Cohort Approach, with Special Reference to an Asbestos Company". Archives of Environmental Health. 6 (2): 210–226. doi:10.1080/00039896.1963.10663384. ISSN 0003-9896.
- Mancuso, Thomas F.; El-Attar, Anas A. (1967). "Cohort Study of Workers Exposed to Betanaphthylamine and Benzidine". Journal of Occupational Medicine. 9 (6): 277–285. ISSN 0096-1736. JSTOR 45004216. PMID 6026374.
- Mancuso, T. F.; Stewart, A.; Kneale, G. (November 1977). "Radiation exposures of Hanford workers dying from cancer and other causes". Health Physics. 33 (5): 369–385. doi:10.1097/00004032-197711000-00002. ISSN 0017-9078. PMID 591314.
- Mancuso, Thomas F. (February 1997). "Chromium as an industrial carcinogen: Part I". American Journal of Industrial Medicine. 31 (2): 129–139. doi:10.1002/(SICI)1097-0274(199702)31:2<129::AID-AJIM1>3.0.CO;2-V. ISSN 0271-3586. PMID 9028428.
- Kneale, G. W.; Mancuso, T. F.; Stewart, A. M. (May 1, 1981). "Hanford radiation study III: a cohort study of the cancer risks from radiation to workers at Hanford (1944-77 deaths) by the method of regression models in life-tables". Occupational and Environmental Medicine. 38 (2): 156–166. doi:10.1136/oem.38.2.156. ISSN 1351-0711. PMC 1008839. PMID 7236541. S2CID 21772090.
