= WZZI =

WZZI may refer to:

- WLGX (FM), a radio station (106.9 FM) licensed to serve Bedford, Virginia, United States, which held the call sign WZZI from 2009 to 2022
- WYHR, a radio station (101.5 FM) licensed to serve Vinton, Virginia, which held the call sign WZZI from 1995 to 2009
