= WXCF =

WXCF may refer to:

- WXCF (AM), a radio station (1230 AM) licensed to serve Clifton Forge, Virginia, United States
- WLYH-FM, a radio station (103.9 FM) licensed to serve Big Island, Virginia, which held the call sign WXCF-FM from 1982 to 2012
