= WKHF =

- Lynchburg, Virginia; United States
- Broadcast area: Lynchburg metropolitan area
- Frequency: 93.7 MHz
- Branding: The Truth Lynchburg

Programming
- Format: Christian talk and teaching
- Affiliations: Salem Radio Network

Ownership
- Owner: Truth Broadcasting Corporation

History
- First air date: March 25, 2011

Technical information
- Licensing authority: FCC
- Facility ID: 183352
- Class: A
- ERP: 1,600 watts
- HAAT: 197 meters (646 ft)
- Transmitter coordinates: 37°20′56.0″N 79°10′5.0″W

Links
- Public license information: Public file; LMS
- Webcast: Listen live
- Website: www.truthnetwork.com/station/wkhf/

WKHF (93.7 FM) is a commercial radio station licensed to Lynchburg, Virginia. It is owned by the Truth Broadcasting Corporation and it airs a Christian talk and teaching format with transmitter sited off of Candlers Mountain Road in Lynchburg.

== History ==
A company organized as United States CP, LLC, owned by W. Philip Robinson, applied to the Federal Communications Commission (FCC) for this station's original construction permit on October 19, 2009. The FCC granted the permit on December 15, 2009, with a scheduled expiration date of December 15, 2012. The station was assigned the call sign "WKHF" by the FCC on October 29, 2010.

With construction completed and testing set to commence, the station applied for its license to cover on March 2, 2011. As of March 4, 2011, this application was accepted for filing by the FCC and was awaiting further action by the commission. After several days of equipment testing and broadcasting under program test authority, the station began regular broadcasting as "93-7 KHF" at on the evening of March 25, 2011. The station was simulcast on WZZI, from June 2012 until November 2, 2012.

WKHF was later operated under a local marketing agreement by Radiowerks Broadcasting of Central Virginia, which was also working on a deal to purchase the station. However, in June 2014, WKHF and sister station WJVR were sold to Todd Robinson's WVJT, LLC for $200,000. The sale was consummated on July 31, 2014.

On April 14, 2021, WKHF was sold to Lynchburg Media Partners. A day later, WKHF dropped its inaugural hot AC format and began stunting with Christmas music, still under the "93.7 KHF" branding. On May 4, 2021, WKHF ended its Christmas music stunt and launched a gold-based country music format, branded as "Rebel 93.7". The sale to Lynchburg Media Partners, at a price of $500,000, was consummated on September 17, 2021.

Truth Broadcasting Corporation purchased WKHF from Lynchburg Media Partners for $480,000 in 2022, and began operating the station under a time brokerage agreement on April 1. WKHF would join its "Truth Network", which would expand to the Roanoke side of the market via WVMP that December.
