= WXCF (AM) =

Radio station in Clifton Forge, Virginia (1973–2024)

Clifton Forge, Virginia; United States
- Broadcast area: Clifton Forge, Virginia; Covington, Virginia
- Frequency: 1230 kHz

Ownership
- Owner: Todd P. Robinson; (WVJT, LLC)
- Sister stations: WJVR, WKEY

History
- First air date: January 1973
- Last air date: November 24, 2024
- Former call signs: WXCF (1972–2012); WHTU (2012)
- Call sign meaning: Clifton Forge

Technical information
- Facility ID: 28341
- Class: C
- Power: 1,000 watts
- Transmitter coordinates: 37°49′18.5″N 79°48′49.2″W
- Translator: 107.5 W298BQ (Covington)

Links
- Website: highlandsmediagroup.com/stations/hits-1075-fm/

WXCF was a classic hits and oldies broadcast radio station licensed to Clifton Forge, Virginia. WXCF served Clifton Forge and Covington. WXCF was owned and operated by WVJT, LLC.

== History ==
WXCF received its construction permit in December 1972 and applied for its license to broadcast on January 4, 1973.

The station went silent on January 18, 2012, citing a need for "significant repairs". The call sign WHTU was "parked" on the license for several weeks in November 2012 before it was put into use on the former WXCF-FM the following month. As the Telecommunications Act of 1996 mandates automatic deletion of any station that is continuously silent for one year, WXCF returned to the air on the afternoon of January 17, 2013.

In early 2016, WXCF switched from a simulcast of WJVR to airing its own classic hits and oldies format.

WXCF was an affiliate of University of Virginia sports, including football, basketball, and Coaches’ shows throughout each season.

The Federal Communications Commission cancelled the station’s license on November 14, 2024. WKEY's programming remains on W298BQ (107.5 FM) and an HD Radio channel of WJVR.

== Translator ==
In addition to the main station, WXCF was relayed by an FM translator.

Call sign	Frequency	City of license	FID	ERP (W)	HAAT	Class	FCC info
W298BQ	107.5 FM	Covington, Virginia	148092	250	15 m (49 ft)	D	LMS
