= WKEY =

WKEY could refer to:

- WKEY (AM), a radio station (1340 AM) licensed to serve Covington, Virginia, United States
- WKEY-FM, a radio station (93.5 FM) licensed to serve Key West, Florida, United States
