= WBZS (disambiguation) =

WBZS may refer to:

- WARJ, a radio station (102.5 FM) licensed to Shawsville, Virginia, United States, which held the call sign WBZS from 2012 to 2020
- WSJW (AM), a radio station (550 AM) licensed to Pawtucket, Rhode Island, United States, which used the call sign WBZS from 2011 to 2012
- WDCJ, a radio station (92.7 FM) licensed to Prince Frederick, Maryland, United States, which used the call sign WBZS-FM from 2000 to 2006
- WTNT (AM), a radio station (730 AM) licensed to Alexandria, Virginia, which used the call sign WBZS from 1995 until 2000
- WIWA (AM), a radio station (1270 AM) licensed to Eatonville, Florida, United States, which used the call sign WBZS from 1988 until 1991
