= Rayon Terrace, Virginia =

Unincorporated community in Virginia, United States

Coordinates: 37°45′54″N 79°59′46″W

Rayon Terrace is an unincorporated community in Alleghany County, Virginia, United States.

Rayon Terrace is a village in the city of Covington. It was formerly called and is generally still referred to South Covington. The village takes its name from the former Rayon Industrial Plant that opened in the 1920s. After the Rayon Plant closed in 1961, the plant was then taken over by Hercules, Incorporated.

Rayon Terrace is one of the quieter neighborhoods in the city of Covington with one church, six small businesses, a small ballfield, and mountains to view. There was also a small post office located at the corner of Jackson and Kadel streets until it was closed in the 1970s.
