= WLYH =

WLYH may refer to:

- WLYH (TV), a television station licensed to serve Red Lion, York County, Pennsylvania
- WLYH-FM, a low-power radio station (103.9 FM) licensed to serve Big Island, Virginia, United States
- WNUZ-LP, a low-power radio station (92.9 FM) licensed to serve Gap, Pennsylvania, United States, which held the call sign WLYH-LP in 2017
- WXBU, a television station (channel 23/virtual 15) licensed to serve Lancaster, Pennsylvania, which held the call sign WLYH-TV from 1959 to 2016
