= WKEY (AM) =

Radio station in Covington, Virginia (1941–2024)

- Covington, Virginia; United States
- Broadcast area: Covington, Virginia; Clifton Forge, Virginia
- Frequency: 1340 kHz
- Branding: 103.5 Big Country

Programming
- Format: Country

Ownership
- Owner: Todd P. Robinson, Inc.; (WVJT, LLC)
- Sister stations: WJVR, WXCF

History
- First air date: May 23, 1941
- Last air date: November 14, 2024
- Former call signs: WJMA (1941–1943)
- Call sign meaning: Earl M. Key (former owner)

Technical information
- Facility ID: 73157
- Class: C
- Power: 1,000 watts
- Translator: See § Translator
- Repeater: 101.9 WJVR-HD2 (Iron Gate)

WKEY (1340 kHz) was an American AM radio station licensed to serve the community of Covington, Virginia. The station, which began broadcasting in 1941, was owned and operated by Todd P. Robinson, Inc. The WKEY broadcast license was held by WVJT, LLC.

The station had broadcast a country music format to the Covington/Clifton Forge area. WKEY was branded, along with its broadcast translator W278BF (103.5 FM, Covington), as "103.5 Big Country".

== History ==
Photo of Earl M. Key, owner of WKEY from 1942 until 1973.

WKEY began broadcasting on May 23, 1941, as WJMA with 250 watts of power. WJMA was owned by John Arrington Jr. and his wife, Marcia. On May 26, 1942, WJMA was sold to Earl M. Key and the callsign changed to WKEY in 1943.

By 1964, the station's power increased to 1,000 watts during the day, while the nighttime power remained at 250 watts. On June 1, 1973, WKEY was sold to WKEY, Inc., headed by E.H. Barr, for an undisclosed amount. WKEY increased its nighttime power in 1987, to 1,000 watts, matching its daytime power.

On December 20, 2002, WKEY was acquired by Quorum Radio Partners of Virginia, Inc. for $650,000. During 2002, WKEY switched from its longtime country format to oldies. On April 20, 2005, Quorum Radio Partners of Virginia, Inc. filed for bankruptcy and WKEY placed into debtor-in-possession status pending a sale. On January 1, 2006, WKEY was sold to Todd P. Robinson, Inc., for $100,000.

On May 1, 2008, the station changed its format from oldies to southern gospel, under "The Cross" branding. On January 14, 2012, WKEY began simulcasting sister station WIQO-FM, after its move to Forest, Virginia, and away from Covington. On August 9, 2012, WKEY began simulcasting full-time on translator station W278BF (103.5 FM), located in Covington, with the country format that was previously heard on WIQO.

On November 18, 2013, WKEY began streaming its signal live on the internet.

The Federal Communications Commission cancelled the station's license on November 14, 2024; WKEY's programming remains on W278BF and the second HD Radio channel of WJVR.

== Programming ==
WKEY carried a mix of local and syndicated programming. Weekdays began with a locally produced morning show called "Highway 64 with Big Al". The station also had a news department which prepared and broadcast local news reports on weekdays. The bulk of the broadcast day's programming came from Westwood One's Real Country network. The station carried a one-minute newscast from Fox News Radio at the top of each hour.

WKEY had broadcast live football games from Covington High School in the Fall. WKEY was an affiliate of the University of Virginia's Virginia Sports Network, which carried the school's football and basketball games. NASCAR Sprint Cup Series races could also be heard on WKEY with live coverage provided by the Motor Racing Network and the Performance Racing Network.

On Sunday mornings, WKEY aired an assortment of religious programming. The programming began with one half hour of locally produced Gospel music program, after which the station aired the syndicated programs In Touch Ministries and Focus on the Family, rounding out the block with a live local church service broadcast.

== Translator ==
In addition to the main station, WKEY was relayed by an FM translator to widen its broadcast area.

Call sign	Frequency	City of license	FID	ERP (W)	HAAT	Class	FCC info
W278BF	103.5 FM	Covington, Virginia	139546	16	310.6 m (1,019 ft)	D	LMS
