= WBWR =

WBWR may refer to:

- WNTC (AM), a radio station (790 AM) licensed to serve Ashland City, Tennessee, United States, which held the call sign WBWR from 2019 to 2020
- WJZM, a radio station (105.1 FM) licensed to serve Waverly, Tennessee, which held the call sign WBWR in 2019
- WXZX, a radio station (105.7 FM) licensed to serve Hilliard, Ohio, United States, which held the call sign WBWR from 2005 to 2015
- WLGX (FM), a radio station (106.9 FM) licensed to serve Bedford, Virginia, United States, which held the call sign WBWR from 2001 to 2005
