= WLGX =

WLGX may refer to:

- WLGX (FM), a radio station (106.9 FM) licensed to serve Bedford, Virginia, United States
- WSDF, a radio station (100.5 FM) licensed to serve Louisville, Kentucky, United States, which held the call sign WLGX from 2009 to 2020
- WFBT (FM), a radio station (106.7 FM) licensed to serve Carolina Beach, North Carolina, United States, which held the call sign WLGX from 1993 to 2003
