= Southern Hotel (Covington, Louisiana) =

- U.S. Historic district – Contributing property
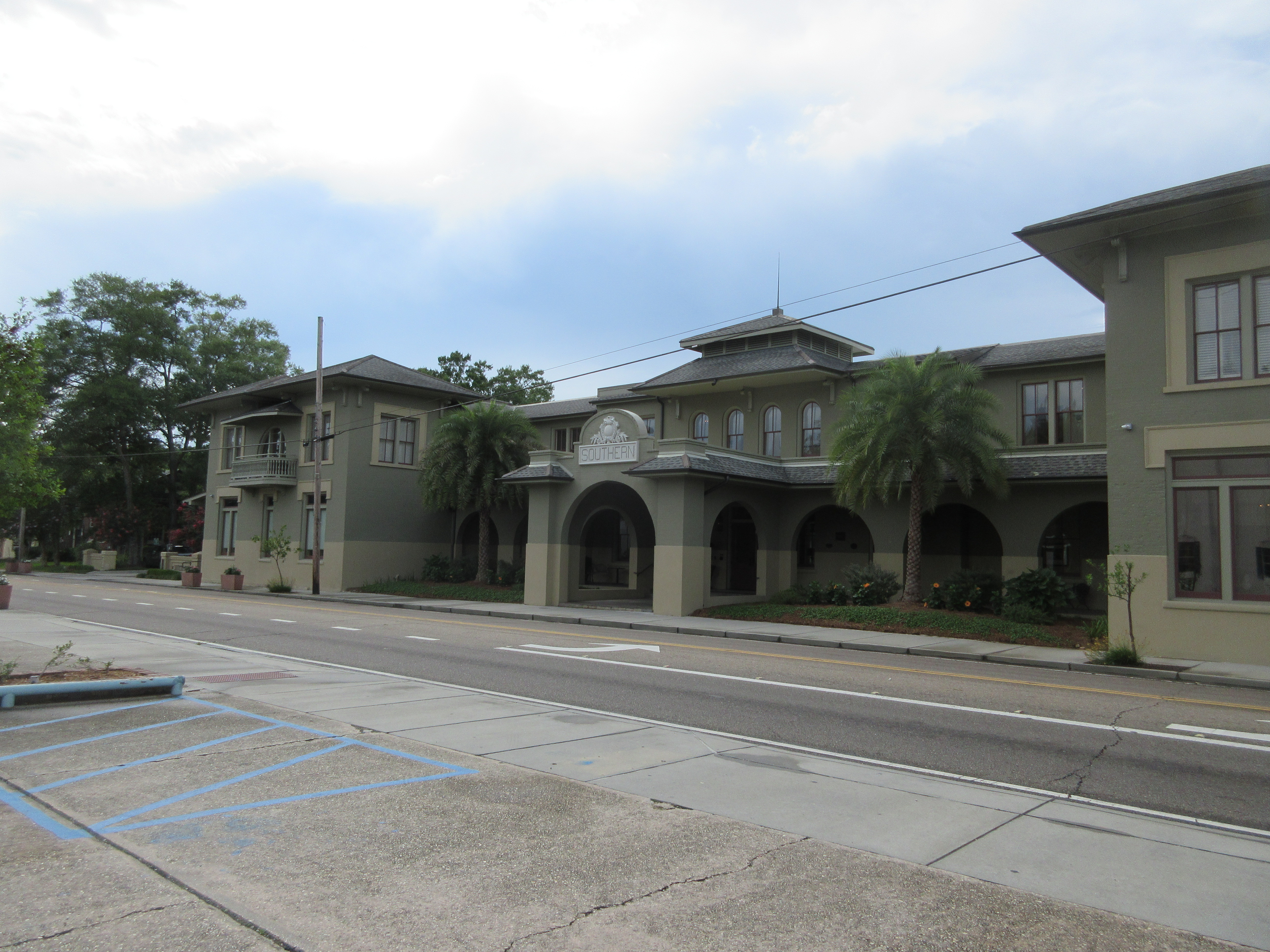
- Hotel front, on E. Boston, 2017

- Location within Louisiana
- Location: 428 E Boston St Covington, Louisiana 70433,
- Coordinates: 30.475636°N 90.096078°W
- Built: 1907
- Part of: Division of St. John Historic District (ID82000461)
- Designated CP: December 6, 1982

The Southern Hotel in Covington, Louisiana, is located in the Division of St. John Historic District also known as the Covington Historic District, a historic district which was listed on the National Register of Historic Places in 1982.

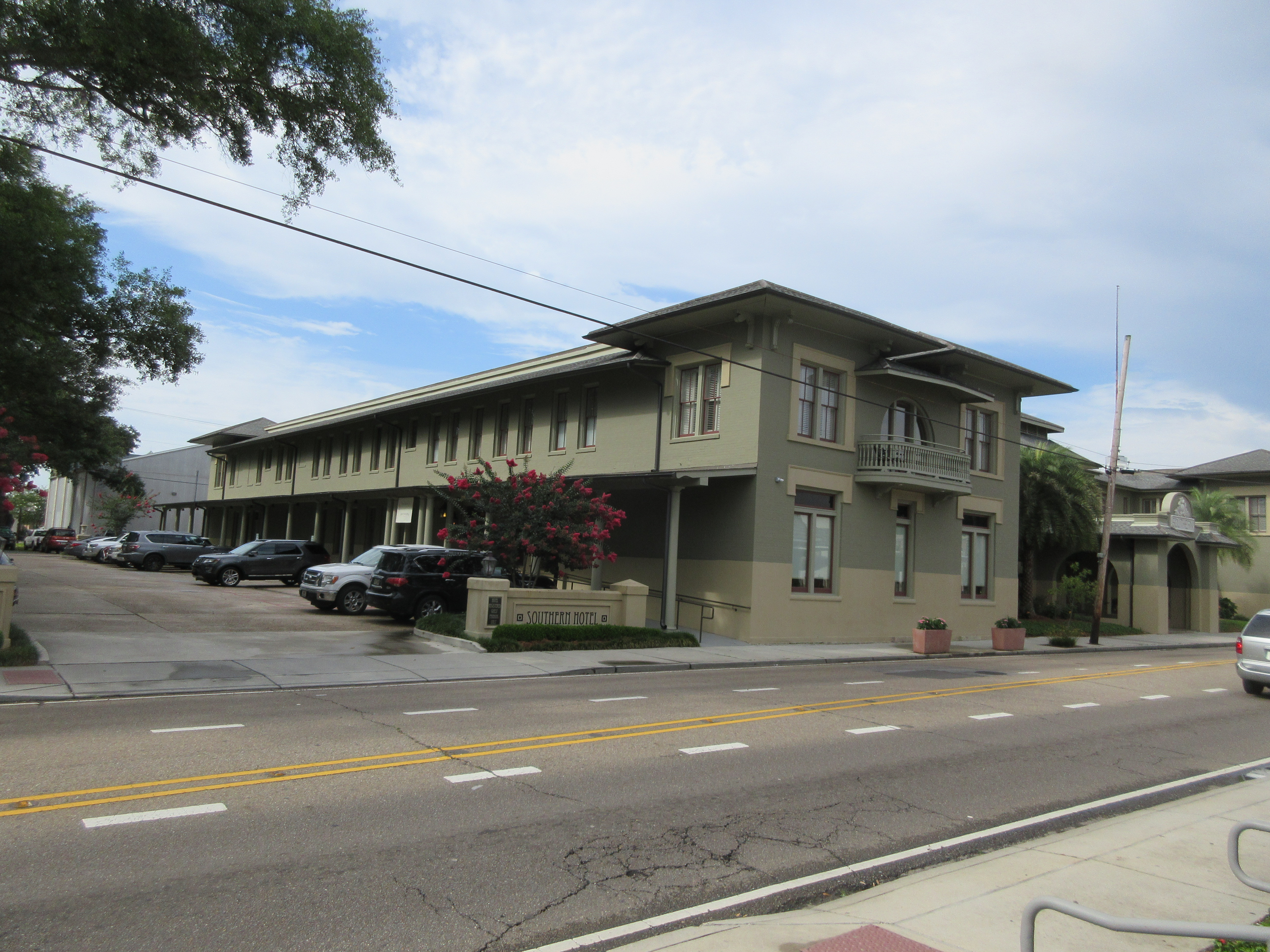
Corner pavilion, in 2017

The hotel is a local landmark. It is a two-story commercial brick building with shopfronts on the ground level, built in 1907. In 1982, it was undergoing restoration. It consisted of 305, 307, 313, 315, and 317 New Hampshire, and 426, 428, 430, 434 Boston. It has "two corner projecting pavilions, matching balconies on the wings, fixed awnings with overhead transoms, arched windows with arched lintels, and elaborate brackets."

It is a member of the Historic Hotels of America. It dates from 1907. It was reopened as a hotel in 2014.
