= The Woman Who Knew Too Much =

1999 book by Gayle Greene

- Author: Gayle Greene
- Language: English
- Published: 1999, 2017 (2nd Ed.)
- Publisher: University of Michigan Press
- Pages: 321 (2nd Ed.)
- ISBN: 978-0-472-07356-6

The Woman Who Knew Too Much is a book about Alice Stewart, authored by Gayle Greene, and published by University of Michigan Press in 1999. The foreword is written by Helen Caldicott.
