= Alice Stewart =

British epidemiologist (1906–2002)

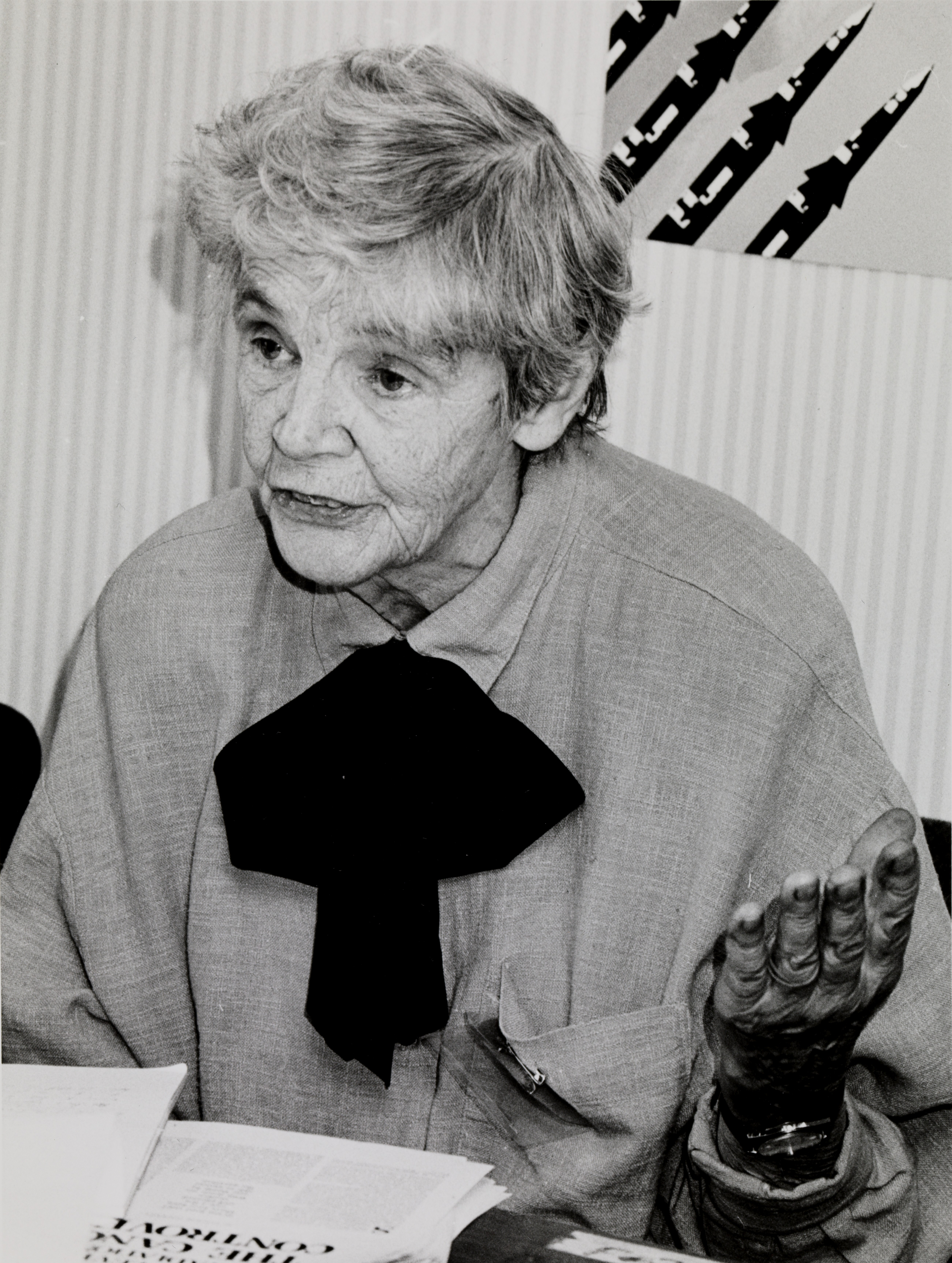
- Alice Stewart
- Born: 4 October 1906; Sheffield, England
- Died: 23 June 2002 (aged 95); Oxford, England
- Known for: social medicine effects of radiation on health
- Awards: Right Livelihood Award (1986) Ramazzini Award (1991)
- Scientific career
- Fields: epidemiology
- Workplaces: Oxford University Medical School

Alice Mary Stewart, née Naish (4 October 1906 – 23 June 2002) was a British physician and epidemiologist specialising in social medicine and the effects of radiation on health. Her study of radiation-induced illness among workers at the Hanford plutonium production plant, Washington, is frequently cited by those who seek to demonstrate that even very low doses of radiation cause substantial hazard. She was the first person to demonstrate the link between x-rays of pregnant women and high cancer rates in their children. She was awarded the Right Livelihood Award in 1986 "for bringing to light in the face of official opposition the real dangers of low-level radiation."

== Early life ==
Stewart was born in Sheffield, England, the daughter of two physicians, Lucy (née Wellburn) and Albert Naish. Both were pioneers in paediatrics, and both became heroes in Sheffield for their dedication to children's welfare. Alice studied pre-clinical medicine at Girton College, Cambridge, and in 1932 completed her clinical studies at the Royal Free Hospital, London. She gained experience in hospital posts in Manchester and London, and in 1936 passed the examinations for membership of the Royal College of Physicians. From 1935 she held the post of registrar at the Royal Free Hospital and from 1939 a consultant post at the Elizabeth Garratt Anderson hospital. In 1941 she moved to Oxford to take up a temporary residency at the Radcliffe Infirmary after which she was recruited by Radcliffe professor Dr. Leslie Witts as his senior assistant working at the Nuffield Department of Clinical Medicine and it was there she developed her interest in social medicine, researching health problems experienced by wartime munitions workers.

== Epidemiological studies ==
The department of social and preventive medicine at Oxford was created in 1942, with Stewart as assistant head. In 1950 she succeeded as head of the unit, but to her disappointment she was not granted the title of "professor", as awarded to her predecessor, because by then the post was considered not to be of great importance. Nonetheless, in 1953 the Medical Research Council allocated funds to her pioneering study of x-rays as a cause of childhood cancer, which she worked on from 1953 until 1956. Her results were initially regarded as unsound. Her findings on fetal damage caused by x-rays of pregnant women were eventually accepted worldwide and the use of medical x-rays during pregnancy and early childhood was curtailed as a result (although it took around two and a half decades). Stewart retired in 1974.

Her most famous investigation came after her formal retirement, while an honorary member of the department of social medicine at the University of Birmingham. Working with Professor Thomas Mancuso of the University of Pittsburgh she examined the sickness records of employees in the Hanford plutonium production plant, Washington state, and found a far higher incidence of radiation-induced ill health than was noted in official studies. Sir Richard Doll, the epidemiologist respected for his work on smoking-related illnesses, attributed her anomalous findings to a "questionable" statistical analysis supplied by her assistant, George Kneale (who was aware of, but may have miscalculated, the unintentional "over-reporting" of cancer diagnoses in communities near to the works). Stewart herself acknowledged that her results were outside the range considered statistically significant. Today, however, her account is valued as a response to the perceived bias in reports produced by the nuclear industry.

In 1986, she was added to the roll of honour of the Right Livelihood Foundation, an annual award presented in Stockholm. Stewart eventually gained her coveted title of "professor" through her appointment as a professorial fellow of Lady Margaret Hall, Oxford. In 1997 Stewart was invited to become the first Chair of the European Committee on Radiation Risk.

Her biography by Gayle Greene, The Woman Who Knew Too Much, was first published in 1999.

== Selected publications ==
- Stewart, Alice (1948). "Pneumoconiosis of Coal-Miners: A Study of the Disease after Exposure to Dust Has Ceased". British Journal of Industrial Medicine. 5 (3): 120–140. ISSN 0007-1072. JSTOR 27720706.
- Giles, D.; Hewitt, D.; Stewart, A.; Webb, J. (1 September 1956). "Malignant disease in childhood and diagnostic irradiation in utero". Lancet. 271 (6940): 447. doi:10.1016/s0140-6736(56)91923-7. ISSN 0140-6736. PMID 13358242.
- Stewart, A.; Webb, J.; Hewitt, D. (28 June 1958). "A survey of childhood malignancies". British Medical Journal. 1 (5086): 1495–1508. doi:10.1136/bmj.1.5086.1495. ISSN 0007-1447. PMC 2029590. PMID 13546604.
- Mancuso, T. F.; Stewart, A.; Kneale, G. (November 1977). "Radiation exposures of Hanford workers dying from cancer and other causes". Health Physics. 33 (5): 369–385. doi:10.1097/00004032-197711000-00002. ISSN 0017-9078. PMID 591314.
