= Gayle Greene =

American writer and professor

- Occupations: Writer, editor, professor

Academic background
- Education: University of California at Berkeley (BA, MA)
- Alma mater: Columbia University (PhD)

Academic work
- Discipline: English literature
- Sub-discipline: Interdisciplinary Humanities
- Institutions: Scripps College
- Notable works: The Woman Who Knew Too Much: Alice Stewart and the Secrets of Radiation; Insomniac; The Woman's Part: Feminist Criticism of Shakespeare; Making a Difference: Feminist Literary Criticism
- Website: www.gaylegreene.org

Gayle Greene (born 1943) is an American literary critic, writer, editor, and professor emerita at Scripps College, Claremont, California. She is the author of six books, including the biography The Woman Who Knew Too Much and the memoir Insomniac. She has also co-edited anthologies of writing by feminist literary scholars, including The Woman's Part: Feminist Criticism of Shakespeare and Making a Difference: Feminist Literary Criticism.

== Career ==
Greene received degrees from U.C. Berkeley (BA and MA) and Columbia (PhD). She taught at Queens College and Brooklyn College of the City University of New York. In 1974 she began teaching at Scripps College. Teaching at a women's college shifted her focus to women writers.

In Changing the Story: Feminist Fiction and the Tradition, in 1991, she argued that feminist fiction of the 1960s-1980s represents breakthroughs in narrative form and content that make it a literary movement comparable to Modernism. Doris Lessing: The Poetics of Change, 1994, brings biographical, historical, intertextual, formalist, feminist, psychoanalytic, and Marxist approaches to the novels of Lessing, arguing that her primary project is change.

Greene later focused on subjects aimed at a wider readership, and wrote the authorized biography of radiation epidemiologist and anti-nuclear guru Alice Stewart, The Woman Who Knew Too Much: Alice Stewart and the Secrets of Radiation, which was first published in 1999. She is also the author of Insomniac (2008), an account of living with insomnia that combines memoir with scientific investigation and Missing Persons (2018), a memoir about loss of family and the transformation of the Santa Clara Valley to Silicon Valley.

Some of Greene's work drew her into a controversy about the role of ideology in reading that became the centerpiece for the anthology Shakespeare Left and Right. She argued that traditional critical approaches are themselves enmeshed in ideology, though they're taken to be neutral and "objective" because they're familiar. Her 1991 article "The Myth of Neutrality, Again" was criticized in 2018 as "ideological" and threatening to reduce the great thinkers of western culture to 'dead white men'.

In 2012, Greene wrote a poem titled Death’s Brother: A Theogeny of Sleep.

Since her retirement in 2014, Greene's writings have focused on the value of the liberal arts.

Immeasurable Outcomes: Teaching Shakespeare in the Age of the Algorithm pushes back against claims that the humanities are impractical. A reviewer in Forbes described it as “A spirited work in defense of a heartfelt humanist approach to teaching and learning.” It won the Northern California Book Award in nonfiction 2024, an Independent Publishers Book Award Gold Medal and was cited as one of Forbes best books in higher education in 2023.

== Selected works ==
=== As editor ===
- The Woman's Part: Feminist Criticism of Shakespeare, co-ed. Gayle Greene, C.R.S. Lenz, and Carol Neely, University of Illinois Press, 1980.
- Making a Difference: Feminist Literary Criticism, co-ed. Coppélia Kahn, Methuen, 1985; reissued, Routledge, 2002
- Changing Subjects: The Making of Feminist Literary Criticism, coed. Coppélia Kahn, Routledge, 1993; reissued Routledge, 2012

=== As author ===
- Changing the Story: Feminist Fiction and the Tradition, Indiana University Press, 1991
- Doris Lessing: The Poetics of Change, University of Michigan Press, 1994
- The Woman Who Knew Too Much: Alice Stewart and the Secrets of Radiation, University of Michigan Press, 1999; reissued, 2017
- Insomniac, University of California Press, Little Brown, U.K., 2008
- Missing Persons, University of Nevada Press, 2018
- Immeasurable Outcomes: Teaching Shakespeare in the Age of the Algorithm, Johns Hopkins UP, 2023

=== Reprinted articles ===
- “‘This That You Call Love’: Sexual and Social Tragedy in Othello,” Journal of Women's Studies in Literature, 1979; reprinted in Shakespeare and Gender: A History, ed. Deborah Barker and Ivo Kamps, Verso, 1995; reprinted in The Shakespeare Collection, Gale; reprinted in Shakespeare: An Anthology of Criticism and Theory, 1945–2000, ed. Ross McDonald, Blackwell’s, 2004.
- “‘A Kind of Self’: Shakespeare's Cressida,” in The Woman’s Part: Feminist Criticism of Shakespeare, 1980; reprinted in Shakespearean Criticism, ed. Michelle Lee, Gale Research Inc., 1999.
- “‘Rebelling Against the System’: Margaret Atwood's Edible Woman,” Margaret Atwood: Living Authors Series (Pan American University: Edinburg, Texas), 1987; reprinted in Margaret Atwood: Essays on Her Work, ed. Branko Gorjup, Guernica Writers Series, Toronto, 2008.
- “‘New System, New Morality’: Convention and Closure in Margaret Drabble's The Waterfall,” Novel: A Forum on Fiction, Fall 1988; reprinted in Writing the Woman Artist, ed. Suzanne W. Jones, University of Pennsylvania Press, 1991.
- “Margaret Laurence’s The Diviners: Changing the Past,” in Women's Re-Visions of Shakespeare, ed. Marianne Novy, University of Illinois Press, 1990; reprinted in Critical Approaches to the Fiction of Margaret Laurence, ed. Colin Nicolson, Macmillan, 1990.
- “Looking at History,” Changing Subjects, ed Greene and Coppelia Kahn; reprinted in Beyond Deconstruction: The Speculation of Theory and the Experience of Reading, ed. Wendall Harris, Penn State University Press, 1996.
- “Feminist Fiction and the Uses of Memory,” Signs, Winter, 1991; reprinted in The Second Signs Reader: Feminist Scholarship, 1983–1996, ed. Ruth-Ellen B. Joeres and Barbara Laslett, University of Chicago Press, 1996.
- “Alice Stewart and Richard Doll: Reputation and the Shaping of Scientific ‘Truth,’” Perspectives in Biology and Medicine, autumn 2011; reprinted in Women and Gender in Science and Technology, ed Londa Schiebinger, Routledge, March 2014; reprinted in Corporate Ties that Bind: An examination of corporate manipulation and vested interest in public health, ed. Martin Walker, Skyhorse Publ, 2016.
