= Wilhelm Hueper =

German-American occupational cancer researcher

Wilhelm Carl Hueper
- Born: November 4, 1894; Schwerin, Mecklenburg, Germany
- Died: December 1, 1978 (aged 84)
- Education: University of Rostock
- Known for: Pioneer of occupational cancer research; early advocate of environmental carcinogen awareness
- Notable work: Occupational Tumors and Allied Diseases (1942)
- Scientific career
- Fields: Occupational medicine, Environmental health, Oncology
- Workplaces: National Cancer Institute; Loyola Medical School; Haskell Laboratory of Industrial Toxicology

Dr. Wilhelm Carl Hueper, MD (b. November 4, 1894 - d. December 1, 1978) was an early pioneer in the field of occupational medicine, and was the first director of the Environmental Cancer Section of the National Cancer Institute, holding that post from 1948 to 1964. He is best remembered as one of the inspirations for author and environmental scientist, Rachel Carson.

== Early life ==
Hueper was born in Schwerin, Mecklenburg, Germany to an impoverished family. As a young man, he was drafted to fight in World War I, and dodged the chemical residue of poison gas blowing back on German troops. Initially, he was an infantryman, but later became a medic for an infantry battalion. He was a self-described pacifist because of this experience and reading books like "Nie Wieder Krieg" (Never War Again). After the war, he completed medical school of Rostock University in 1920 and then emigrated in 1923 with his wife to the United States., He was employed for six years as a pathologist at Loyola Medical School in Chicago.

In 1933, he returned to Nazi Germany to look for work during the Depression. However, he quickly returned to the United States in 1934, having been shocked witnessing the chaotic state of Germany at that time. He also was appalled at the degraded condition of German science, including the use of human experimentation. He returned to the United States and produced a series of early publications on occupational causes of cancer.

== Research into the causes of cancer ==
Accepting a position as pathologist at the DuPont-funded Haskell Laboratory of Industrial Toxicology, Hueper recognized that certain industrial dyes were causing bladder cancer in DuPont workers, including benzidine and β-Naphthylamine. Hueper warned them explicitly of dangers to their workers in 1937, and throughout 1938. DuPont was unappreciative of this information, and Hueper left because of DuPont's efforts to censor and block publication of what Hueper had learned. In fact, DuPont continued to censor and undermine Hueper's efforts to publish on environmental causes of cancer through back channels throughout the remainder of his lifetime.

Hueper also was one of the first scientists to try to educate the public regarding the carcinogenicity of asbestos. He tried to disseminate this information to the public in 1950 through a twenty-page NCI publication on environmental cancers. However, perhaps bowing to pressure from industry, the NCI would later refuse to publish an update of this pamphlet, leaving Hueper disillusioned and alienated.

Despite the efforts of the chemical industry to halt Hueper's efforts to study and publish on environmental cancer causation, he may have ultimately been indirectly one of the major influences on the environmental movement. Dr. Hueper's most publicly remembered role may have been to influence Rachel Carson, the author of Silent Spring. In her book, Carson credited Hueper with being the first person to recognize the connection between pollution, occupationally-used chemicals and cancer.

Dr. Hueper tried throughout his career to bring attention to corporate efforts to disguise and hide occupational cancers caused by chemicals. His 1942 work "Occupational Tumors and Allied Diseases" is recognized as the first medical textbook listing cancers and their occupational causes. He is the author of over 300 medical articles, editorials, chapters of books, and books on occupational and environmental cancer. Toward the end of his life he was interviewed by Barry Castleman, to whom he said of the struggle against environmental cancer, "This is a war just like any other war, and it will be fought with every dirty means."

A collection of his papers are held at the National Library of Medicine in Bethesda, Maryland.

== Major publications ==
- Occupational tumors and allied diseases, by W.C. Hueper (1942)
- Environmental and Occupational Cancer, by W.C. Hueper Suppl. 209, Public Health Reports (1948)
- "A methodology for environmental and occupational cancer surveys" (Public Health Technical Monograph) by W.C. Hueper (1950)
- "Studies of Occupational Cancer", W. C. Hueper (Public Health Reports, Public Health Monographs; Dec., 1952)
- "A quest into the environmental causes of cancer of the lung "(U.S. Public Health Service, 1955) by W.C. Hueper
- "Silicosis, Asbestosis and Cancer of the Lung," W. C. Hueper; Am. J. Clin. Pathol., 1955
- Trauma and Cancer by W.C. Hueper (1959)
- Carcinogens in the Environment, by W.C. Hueper (Jan. 1, 1961)
- Chemical Carcinogenesis and Cancers, by W.C. Conway and WC Hueper (1964)
- Occupational and nonoccupational exposures to asbestos, Ann. N.Y. Acad. Sci.132:41-44 (1965) (chrysotile is the main cause of asbestos-related cancer)
- Occupational and Environmental Cancers of the Respiratory System (Recent Results in Cancer Research) by W.C. Hueper (Jan. 1, 1966)
- Environmental Cancer, by W.C. Hueper (1974)
