= Dunlap Creek (Virginia) =

Coordinates: 37°47′45″N 79°59′49″W

Location
- Country: United States

Physical characteristics
- Source
  - location: Virginia
- Mouth
  - elevation: 1,237 feet

Dunlap Creek is a 25.9-mile-long (41.7 km) tributary of the Jackson River in the U.S. state of Virginia. It is part of the James River watershed.

The creek forms at Earlehurst in Alleghany County, Virginia, by the confluence of Back Creek and Sweet Springs Creek, both of which rise to the southwest in Monroe County, West Virginia. Dunlap Creek flows northeast, paralleled by State Route 311 as far as the village of Crows. The creek continues northeast, now followed by State Route 159, past the villages of Hematite and Moss Run, then turns more easterly where it is crossed by Interstate 64 east of Callaghan. Now followed by U.S. Route 60, the creek passes the village of Dunlap Beach and joins the Jackson River north of the center of the city of Covington.

== See also ==
- List of rivers of Virginia
