= Dunlap Creek (Tuscarawas River tributary) =

Coordinates: 40°16′24″N 81°32′36″W

Dunlap Creek is a stream located entirely within Tuscarawas County, Ohio. It is a tributary of the Tuscarawas River.

Dunlap Creek was named for a pioneer who settled there.

== See also ==
- List of rivers of Ohio
