= Covington Historic District (Covington, Virginia) =

Historic district in Virginia, United States

- U.S. National Register of Historic Places
- U.S. Historic district
- Virginia Landmarks Register
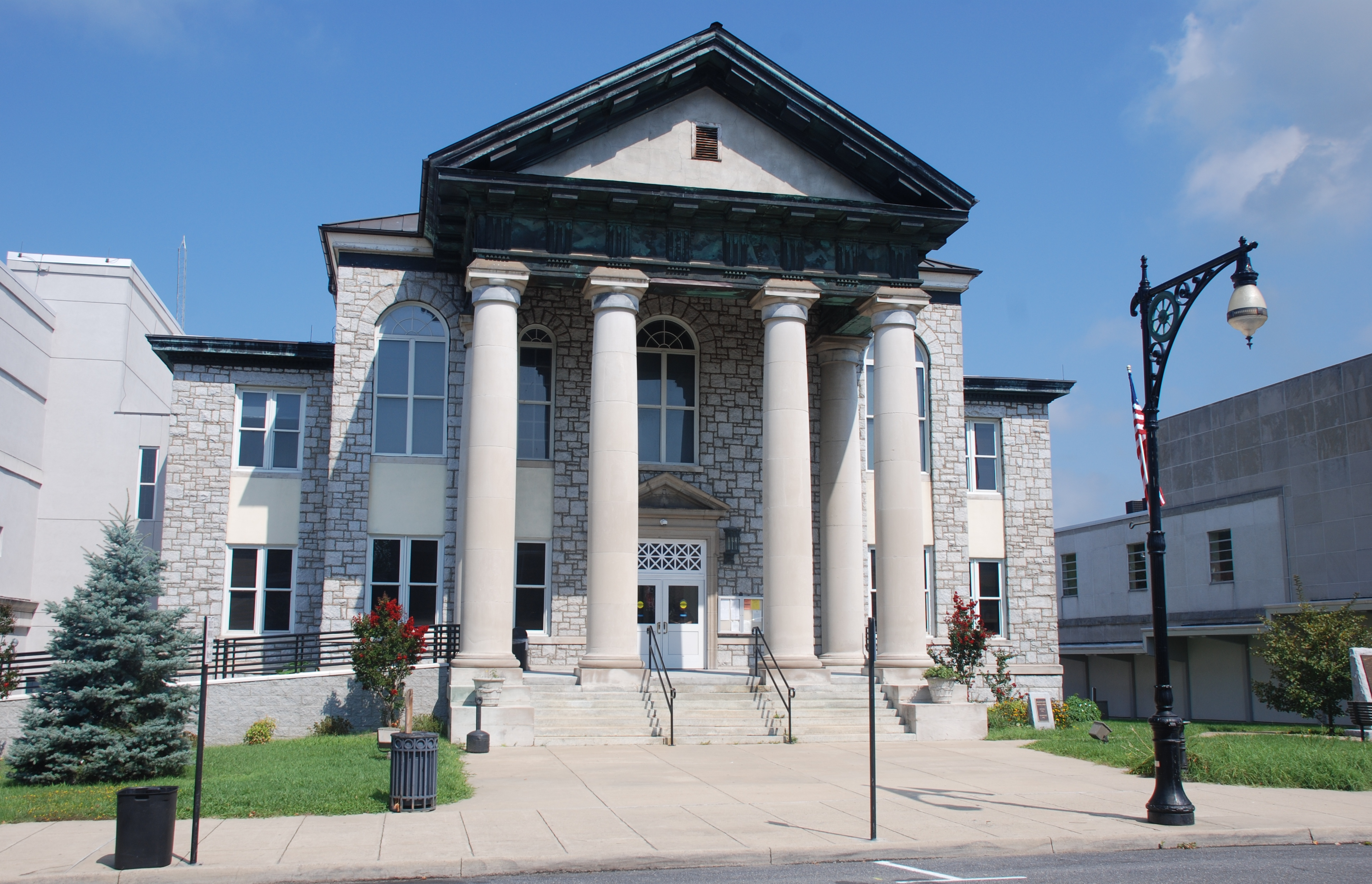
- Alleghany County Courthouse in 2012

- Location within Virginia Location within the United States
- Location: Roughly bounded by the Jackson R., Monroe Ave., CSX RR tracks, and Maple Ave., Covington, Virginia
- Coordinates: 37°47′30″N 79°59′45″W
- Area: 40 acres (16 ha)
- Architect: Bossom, Lord Alfred Charles; Et al
- Architectural style: Late 19th And 20th Century Revivals, Late Victorian, Federal
- NRHP reference No.: 91000099
- VLR No.: 107-0025

Significant dates
- Added to NRHP: February 21, 1991
- Designated VLR: August 21, 1990, April 21, 2004

Covington Historic District is a national historic district located at Covington, Virginia. The district encompasses 108 contributing buildings, one contributing site, and one contributing structure in the historic core of the city of Covington. It includes late-19th and early-20th-century commercial buildings, dwellings that date from around 1820 until 1940, and governmental, educational, religious, industrial, and transportation-related buildings. Notable buildings include Merry Stand (c. 1817), the James Burk House (1824), Callaghan House (1840s), William W. Lawrence House (1850s), Rinehart Building (c. 1895), Covington Savings Bank (1910s), I. O. O. F. Building, Covington Post Office (1914), Hotel Collins (1910), Hippodrome Theater (1920s), C&O Railway and Freight Station (1914-1915), Alleghany County Courthouse (1910), Alleghany County Jail, Sacred Heart Catholic Church, Emmanuel Episcopal Church, First Presbyterian Church (1924), and Covington Baptist Church (1902).

It was listed on the National Register of Historic Places in 1991.
