= WYHR =

- Vinton, Virginia; United States
- Broadcast area: Roanoke metropolitan area
- Frequency: 101.5 MHz

Programming
- Format: Christian talk and teaching
- Network: Bible Broadcasting Network
- Affiliations: Salem Radio Network

Ownership
- Owner: Bible Broadcasting Network

History
- First air date: December 12, 1995; 30 years ago (as WZZI)
- Former call signs: WAJB (1994–1995, CP); WZZI (1995–2009); WVMP (2009–2025)

Technical information
- Licensing authority: FCC
- Facility ID: 9047
- Class: A
- Power: 1,200 watts
- HAAT: 198 meters (650 ft)
- Transmitter coordinates: 37°21′54″N 79°51′57″W
- Translator: (101.9 MHz) W270CU (Roanoke)

Links
- Public license information: Public file; LMS
- Website: bbn1.bbnradio.org/english/

WYHR (101.5 FM) is a radio station licensed to Vinton, Virginia, and serving the Roanoke metropolitan area. WYHR is owned by the Bible Broadcasting Network. It broadcasts a Christian talk and teaching radio format.

WYHR has an effective radiated power (ERP) of 1,200 watts. The transmitter is on Mill Mountain in Roanoke, off Prospect Road SE.

== History ==
=== WZZI ===
The station signed on the air on December 12, 1995, as WZZI. It was owned by H. Edward Hale's Carousel Entertainment, and originally played country music. The station flipped to a modern rock format in January 1999.

Roanoke residents Karen and Robert Travis purchased WZZI in January 2000. They had just purchased WRVX (97.9 FM) in Lynchburg, Virginia, which they renamed to WZZU. Formats under the Travises included alternative rock "Z101" and oldies "Oldies 101.5".

=== Oldies and classic rock ===
In 2004, Centennial Broadcasting bought the two stations. WZZI began simulcasting WZZU. The two stations played oldies as "BOB FM". They switched to classic rock as "The Planet" from 2006 to 2009. WZZU continues airing a mainstream rock format on 97.9 FM.

In July 2008, Washington Redskins owner Daniel Snyder announced a purchase of Centennial's four-station Roanoke-Lynchburg cluster by his Red Zebra Broadcasting. The sale fell through and no paperwork was ever filed with the Federal Communications Commission.

=== Adult album alternative ===
Centennial instituted a locally focused adult album alternative (AAA) format on October 12, 2009, branded "101.5 The Valley's Music Place" WVMP.

WZZI/WVMP was the Roanoke network affiliate for the Virginia Cavaliers football and basketball broadcasts from 2007 through 2012. The Cavaliers moved back to their longtime home WFIR at the beginning of the 2012 football season, as the university preferred to partner with a news-talk station. WZZU, which joined as Lynchburg's affiliate at the same time, remains affiliated with the network.

Centennial placed WVMP on the market in 2010. Ed Walker's Cityworks Community Broadcasting purchased the station to preserve the AAA format. Walker sold it to Dr. William E. "Eddie" Amos' Community Media Group in 2014.

=== Changes in ownership ===
Todd Robinson, owner of several full-powered stations in the Roanoke/Lynchburg/Bedford market, began operating WVMP by local marketing agreement (LMA) on August 1, 2016, and announced intentions to purchase the station from Community Media Group on August 3 for $600,000. Dr. Amos cited the decreasing amount of time he had to devote to the station, but was to become a minority shareholder in Robinson's WVJT, LLC. No changes to format or branding came with the agreement. WVJT withdrew the application to transfer control on October 19, and Community Media Group resumed operating the station.

WVMP began simulcasting on separately-owned WBZS on December 1, 2016, to better cover the southwestern Roanoke area, Christiansburg and Blacksburg. WVMP's main transmitter on Mill Mountain is heavily shielded to the south and west by mountains. In January 2017, the two stations rebranded as "101.5 and 102.5 The Mountain".

Todd Robinson made a second attempt to acquire the station by purchasing Community Media Group itself for $250,000 on October 20, 2017. The sale was granted on December 1, 2017.

On February 1, 2018, the AAA format moved to WBZS alone and WVMP switched to a simulcast of oldies-formatted WHTU (103.9 FM, Big Island) and WZZI (106.9 FM, Bedford) as "Oldies 101.5".

WVMP returned to AAA "The Mountain" on December 1, 2019, as the three-year local marketing agreement with WBZS expired.

=== Christian radio ===
On November 30, 2022, at midnight, WVMP's adult album alternative format ended on the 101.5 FM signal and went online-only. On December 2, 2022, Truth Broadcasting began operating the station and flipped it to Christian talk and teaching as "The Truth".

The Bible Broadcasting Network acquired WVMP for $500,000 in 2024. On January 10, 2025, the call sign was changed to WYHR.
