= Dunlap Creek (Duck River tributary) =

Stream in Hickman County, Tennessee, U.S.

Coordinates: 35.732291°N 87.266399°W

Dunlap Creek is a stream in Hickman County, Tennessee, in the United States. It is a tributary of Duck River.

Dunlap Creek was named for Robert Dunlap, a pioneer who settled at the creek in 1810.

== See also ==
- List of rivers of Tennessee
