= Iron Gate, Virginia =

- Town
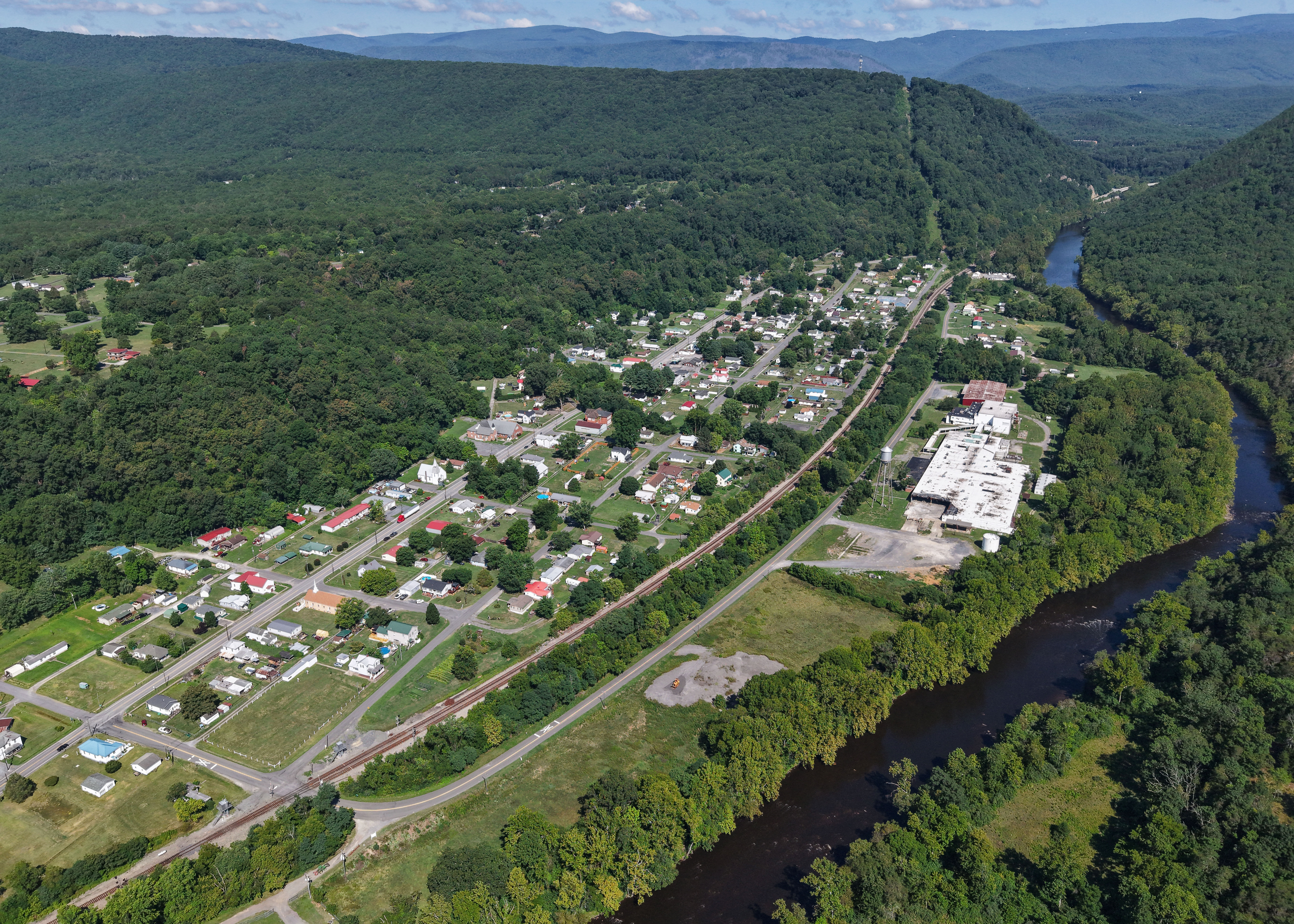
- Aerial view (2026)
- Nickname: IG
- Motto: Gateway to the Alleghany Highlands
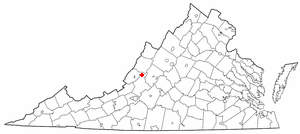
- Location of Iron Gate, Virginia
- Coordinates: 37°47′55″N 79°47′28″W
- Country: United States
- State: Virginia
- County: Alleghany
- Established: 1889

Government
  - Type: Mayor–council
  - Mayor: Gary A. Craig
  - Vice Mayor: Richard Erskine

Area
  - Total: 0.35 sq mi (0.90 km^{2})
  - Land: 0.33 sq mi (0.86 km^{2})
  - Water: 0.019 sq mi (0.05 km^{2})
- Elevation: 1,037 ft (316 m)

Population (2020)
  - Total: 324
  - Density: 980/sq mi (380/km^{2})
- Time zone: UTC-5 (Eastern (EST))
  - Summer (DST): UTC-4 (EDT)
- ZIP Code: 24448
- Area codes: 540 and 826
- FIPS code: 51-40024
- GNIS feature ID: 1493127
- Website: https://irongateva.com/

Iron Gate is a town in eastern Alleghany County, Virginia, United States. The population was 324 at the 2020 census. The town is located along U.S. Route 220, near Clifton Forge.

== History ==
The Town of Iron Gate was incorporated in 1890. During the 1880s, iron mines began opening in Alleghany County and the Alleghany Iron and Ore Company opened its blast furnace in the northern end of Iron Gate. The proximity to the railroad made the site of Iron Gate an optimal location. Many men were employed by the company until 1919 when operations ceased. The town was the hub of Alleghany County's iron mining boom in the late 1800s, and later was home to a large tannery operation.

=== Potential disincorporation ===
In 2000, the town voted against repealing its charter. Yet, the town is once again facing potential disincorporation.

Four out of six seats on the town council are held as of 2026, and two of those members' terms conclude at the end of the year; the mayor has also indicated that she won't run for reelection at the conclusion of her term, which ends on December 31, 2026. The mayor has considered dissolving the town's Board of Zoning Appeals because no one can be found to sit on it and the volunteer zoning coordinator position is vacant.

The town is struggling to find officials to sit on elected and appointed boards, partially because the town was found liable for $240,000 for property damage that from a drainage problem that was never addressed; nothing has been paid, and interest now puts the required payment over $300,000. The town's tax base is rather small and it cannot attract a financial institution to offer it a loan. A small number of paid employees handle municipal tasks, but personnel challenges have required the mayor to complete some tasks herself. Although actual disincorporation is not on the 2026 ballot, a town council meeting was held where potential disincorporation were discussed. A question will be placed on the ballot in November 2026 to ask voters if they want to reduce the size of the town council to 4 members;. If the town were to disincorporate, residents would still be liable for its outstanding debts.

== Geography ==
Iron Gate is located at 37°47′55″N 79°47′28″W (37.798484, -79.791219).

According to the United States Census Bureau, the town has a total area of 0.3 square mile (0.9 km^{2}), all land. Iron Gate is also where the headwaters of the James River arise.

=== Climate ===
The climate in this area has mild differences between highs and lows, and there is adequate rainfall year-round. According to the Köppen Climate Classification system, Iron Gate has a marine west coast climate, abbreviated "Cfb" on climate maps.

== Demographics ==
Historical population
| Census | Pop. | Note | %± |
|---|---|---|---|
| 1890 | 199 | | — |
| 1900 | 392 | | 97.0% |
| 1910 | 600 | | 53.1% |
| 1920 | 699 | | 16.5% |
| 1930 | 777 | | 11.2% |
| 1940 | 719 | | −7.5% |
| 1950 | 725 | | 0.8% |
| 1960 | 716 | | −1.2% |
| 1970 | 692 | | −3.4% |
| 1980 | 620 | | −10.4% |
| 1990 | 417 | | −32.7% |
| 2000 | 404 | | −3.1% |
| 2010 | 388 | | −4.0% |
| 2020 | 324 | | −16.5% |
Source: U.S. Census Bureau

=== 2020 census ===
As of the census of 2020, there were 324 people residing in the town. There were 170 housing units. The racial makeup of the town was 87.3% White, 5.2% African American or Black, 0.3% American Indian, 0.3% Asian, 0.0% Pacific Islander, 0.0% from other races, and 6.8% from two or more races. Hispanic or Latino of any race were 1.5% of the population.

=== 2010 census ===
As of the census of 2010, there were 388 people residing in the town. There were 183 housing units. The racial makeup of the town was 94.8% White, 3.9% Black or African American, 0.0% Native American, 0.0% Asian, 0.3% Pacific Islander, 0.0% from other races, and 1.0% from two or more races. 1.0% of the population were Hispanic or Latino of any race.

=== 2000 census ===
At the 2000 census there were 404 people, 185 households, and 121 families living in the town. The population density was 1,170.6 people per square mile (445.7/km^{2}). There were 197 housing units at an average density of 570.8 per square mile (217.3/km^{2}). The racial makeup of the town was 94.55% White, 5.20% African American, and 0.25% from two or more races. Of the 185 households 17.3% had children under the age of 18 living with them, 54.6% were married couples living together, 7.6% had a female householder with no husband present, and 34.1% were non-families. 31.9% of households were one person and 17.8% were one person aged 65 or older. The average household size was 2.18 and the average family size was 2.73.

The age distribution was 16.6% under the age of 18, 8.2% from 18 to 24, 24.0% from 25 to 44, 27.5% from 45 to 64, and 23.8% 65 or older. The median age was 46 years. For every 100 females, there were 96.1 males. For every 100 females aged 18 and over, there were 94.8 males.

The median household income was $26,094 and the median family income was $34,464. Males had a median income of $27,222 versus $17,500 for females. The per capita income for the town was $16,703. About 7.4% of families and 9.9% of the population were below the poverty line, including 8.8% of those under age 18 and 13.7% of those age 65 or over.

== Economy ==
Iron Gate is predominately a bedroom community of Clifton Forge and Covington. Garten Trucking operates a large trucking terminal and warehouse in the town.

== Recreation ==
The Virginia Department of Wildlife Resources maintains a public access point to the James River south of the town limits. The Iron Gate public access point is one of twelve that make up the Upper James River Water Trail, a blueway along the James River.

== Government ==
Iron Gate operates a Mayor–council form of government.

Iron Gate Town Council is composed of an elected mayor and six council members who are elected at-large.

== Education ==
Iron Gate is served by Alleghany County Public Schools. Public school students residing in Iron Gate are zoned to attend Sharon Elementary School, Covington Middle School (since 2023), and Alleghany High School.

Mountain Gateway Community College in nearby Clifton Forge is the closest higher education institution to the town.

== Infrastructure ==
=== Public safety ===
Law enforcement is provided by the Alleghany County Sheriff's Office. Fire protection is provided by the Iron Gate Volunteer Fire Department which operates a fire station within the town. Emergency medical services are provided by the Iron Gate Volunteer Fire Department and Clifton Forge Rescue Squad.

== Transportation ==
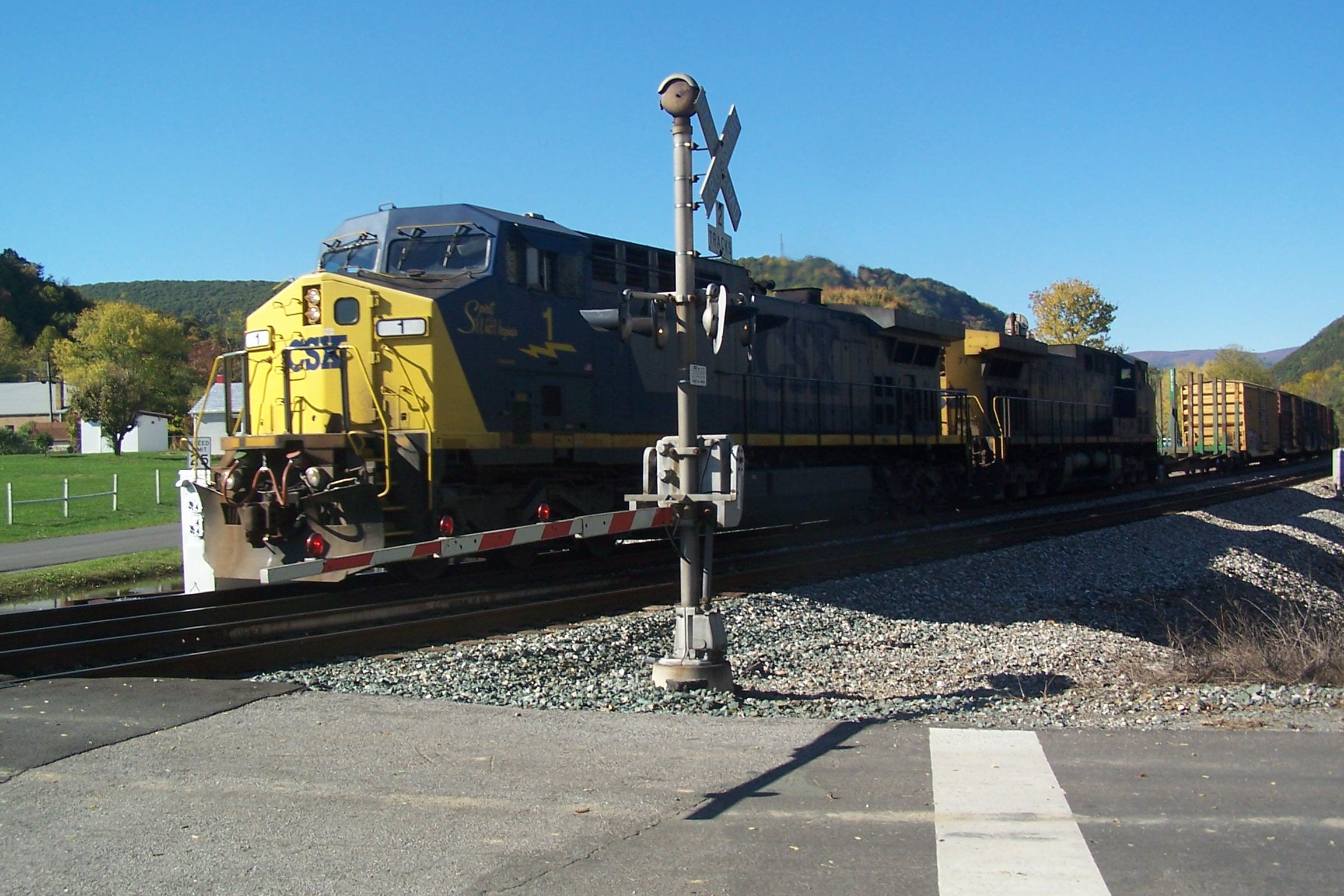
A CSX freight train passes through Iron Gate in 2007.

=== Air ===
Ingalls Field, located near Hot Springs is the closest general aviation airport to the town. The Greenbrier Valley Airport and Roanoke-Blacksburg Regional Airport are the closest airports with commercial service.

=== Roads ===
- U.S. Route 220 (Market Avenue)

=== Rail ===
The CSX-operated James River Subdivision runs through the town. The closest passenger rail service is located in Clifton Forge.
