= Division of St. John Historic District =

- U.S. National Register of Historic Places
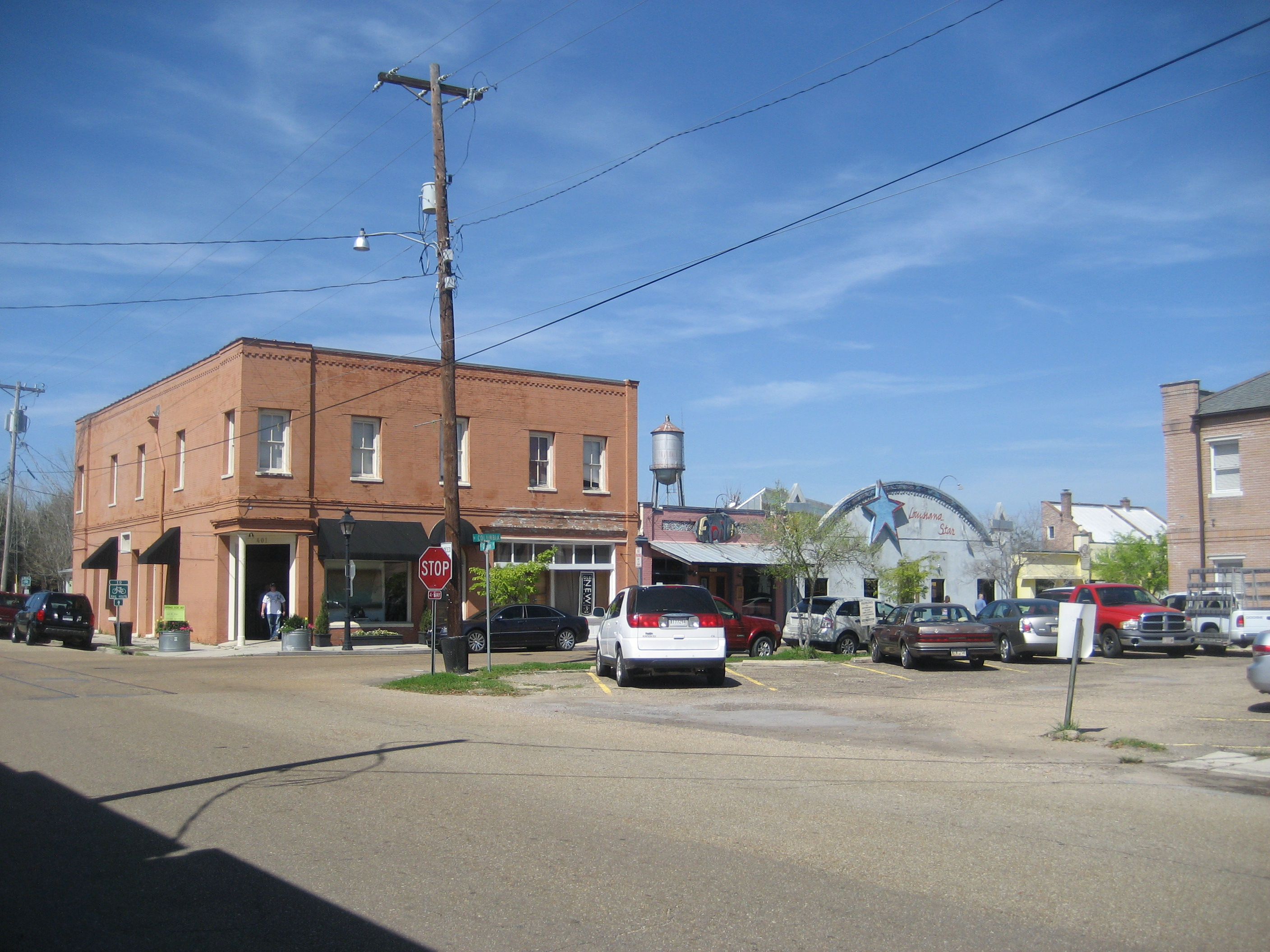
- Photo in 2009

- Location within Louisiana
- Location: US 190 and LA 21, Covington, Louisiana
- Coordinates: 30.475833°N 90.093889°W
- Area: 100 acres (40 ha)
- Built: 1813
- Architectural style: Shotgun, Bungalow/craftsman, Queen Anne
- NRHP reference No.: 82000461; 100008751 (decrease)

Significant dates
- Added to NRHP: December 6, 1982
- Boundary decrease: March 23, 2023

The Division of St. John Historic District, in Covington, Louisiana, also known as the Covington Historic District, is a 100 acres (40 ha) historic district which was listed on the National Register of Historic Places in 1982. It is the original portion of Covington, on the east of north–south U.S. 190; Business 190 also known as LA 21 runs through it, is E. Boston St.

The unusual layout of the town dates from 1813, and is deemed a contributing site in the listing. It was laid out in 360 feet (110 m) square blocks, each with a small central square; the squares became known as "oxlots" due to tethering of oxen and other livestock in them.

The listing included 170 contributing buildings and 77 intrusions (non-contributing), mostly one-story and spread relatively evenly throughout. Of the structures, six were from before 1880, 163 structures from 1881 to 1930, and 77 structures from 1931 on.

A local landmark in the district is the Southern Hotel, a two-story commercial brick building with shopfronts on the ground level, built in 1911. In 1982, it was undergoing restoration. It consisted of 305, 307, 313, 315, and 317 New Hampshire, and 426, 428, 430, 434 Boston. It has "two corner projecting pavilions, matching balconies on the wings, fixed awnings with overhead transoms, arched windows with arched lintels, and elaborate brackets."

"Collins employed an unusual urban planning scheme in laying out the district.

Each block, measuring 360 f®6*1 square f was created with a small central square which connected to the street system by alleyways. These areas of 120 feet square were to be held in common.* They became known as oxlots, undoubtedly because farmers and merchants, would tether oxen and livestock within the sites. Today the oxlots constitute more than nine acres of open space within the urban area.

The ox lots continue to play a major role in Covington's historical landscape as a unique urban design. The 20 blocks within the current district boundaries were all planned with ox lots. Of these, only 2 blocks contain large intrusions. The surviving 18 ox lots have varying degrees of encroachment, with nine largely unintruded upon (Photos 2, 3, & 4), and one completely pristine. Therefore, this unusual resource remains over 60% intact.

The mere survival of these urban spaces is remarkable, as they could have been easily eliminated or obliterated. Careful evaluation of the existing encroachments reveals that the ox lots are still essentially open, and have retained their confined, semi-naturalistic character. These spaces are a major component of "Covington's cultural and historical assets, which must be recognized in the unifying pattern of architecture and the landscape."

"Extant buildings are post-1880 due to two major fires which destroyed much of the district. Subsequent redevelopment booms in the lumber and "ozone" resort industries precipitated architectural growth in the late-nineteenth and early-twentieth centuries.

A. Commercial Business District The existing structures in the District of St. John integrate residential and commercial usage. The major concentration of business activity developed in the vicinity of the Southern Hotel and the New Orleans-Great Northern Railroad, extending eastward. The buildings are principally one and two story brick structures with recessed storefront entries, fixed awnings, and arched windows remotely derived from the Victorian Renaissance Revival (Photo 5). Limited to a central six block area, these buildings are closely spaced with no setbacks (Photo 6). Many former domestic buildings adjacent to this area have been adapted for commercial use, which provides a diverse streetscape image.
