= WARJ =

- Shawsville, Virginia; United States
- Broadcast area: Roanoke, Virginia; New River Valley
- Frequency: 102.5 MHz

Programming
- Format: Christian worship music
- Network: Air1

Ownership
- Owner: Educational Media Foundation

History
- First air date: 2013
- Former call signs: WBZS (2012–2020)

Technical information
- Licensing authority: FCC
- Facility ID: 89133
- Class: A
- Power: 150 Watts
- HAAT: 591 meters (1,939 ft)
- Transmitter coordinates: 37°11′42.0″N 80°9′23.0″W

Links
- Public license information: Public file; LMS

WARJ is a radio station licensed to Shawsville, Virginia, broadcasting the Air1 network to Roanoke, Virginia and the New River Valley. WARJ is owned by the Educational Media Foundation.

== History ==
The station signed on in 2013 as WBZS. From its sign-on, the station was leased by owner George S. Flinn, Jr., to Three Daughters Media, which simulcast the talk format of WIQO-FM Lynchburg.

WBZS entered into a three-year lease to Community Media Group, owner of adult album alternative WVMP, on December 1, 2016.

On February 1, 2018, the AAA format moved exclusively to WBZS, which rebranded as "102.5 The Mountain".

Upon the lease ending on December 1, 2019, the AAA programming moved back to WVMP.

In April 2020, Flinn donated the station's signal to air a noncommercial news/talk format focusing specifically on coverage of the COVID-19 pandemic in the New River Valley. The station was led by WVMP's former general manager and a volunteer staff, with on-air hosts remote working from home studios. Three months later, he sold the station and eight others to the Educational Media Foundation for $3.4 million. Upon the sale being consummated on October 29, 2020, the call letters were changed to WARJ, as the station picked up EMF's Air1 network.
