= WJVR =

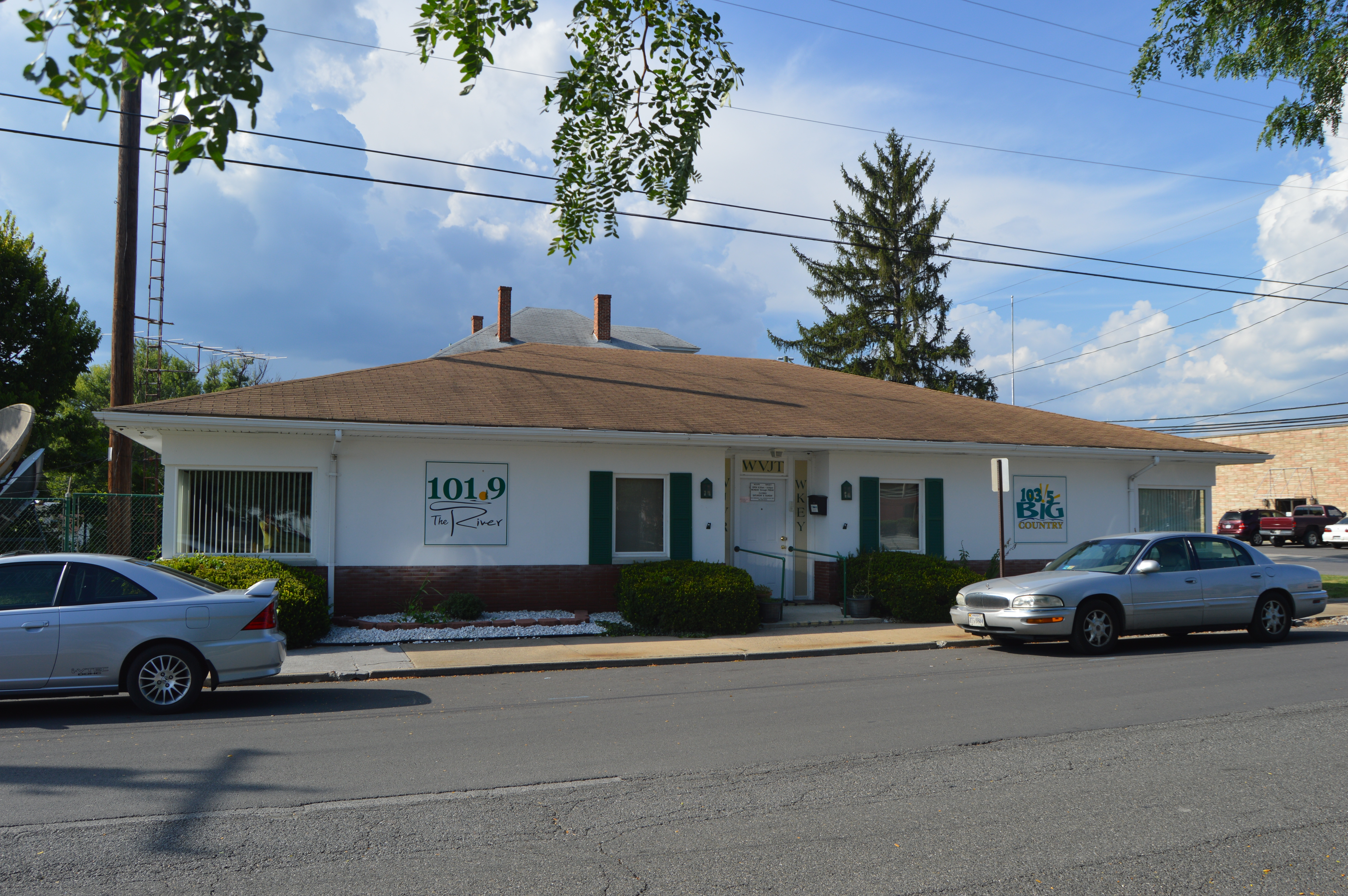
- WJVR's studios in Covington, Virginia
- Iron Gate, Virginia; United States
- Broadcast area: Covington, Virginia; Clifton Forge, Virginia
- Frequency: 101.9 MHz (HD Radio)
- Branding: 101.9 The River

Programming
- Format: Classic rock
- Subchannels: HD2: Country; HD3: Classic hits
- Affiliations: Fox News Radio; Westwood One; Virginia Tech IMG Sports Network

Ownership
- Owner: Todd P. Robinson; (WVJT, LLC)

History
- First air date: September 12, 2012
- Call sign meaning: "Jackson River"

Technical information
- Licensing authority: FCC
- Facility ID: 190379
- Class: A
- ERP: 560 watts
- HAAT: 322 meters (1,056 ft)
- Transmitter coordinates: 37°47′35.0″N 79°55′59.0″W
- Translators: HD2: 103.5 W278BF (Covington); HD3: 107.5 W298BQ (Covington)

Links
- Public license information: Public file; LMS
- Webcast: Listen live Listen live (HD2); Listen Live (HD3)
- Website: WJVR Online; WJVR-HD2 Online; WJVR-HD3 Online

WJVR (101.9 FM, "The River") is a commercial radio station licensed to Iron Gate, Virginia, serving Covington and Clifton Forge in Virginia. It has a classic rock radio format and is owned and operated by Todd P. Robinson. It also carries Alleghany High School sports. The studios and offices are on Oak Street in Covington.

WJVR has an effective radiated power (ERP) of 560 watts as a Class A station. Its transmitter is off Valley Ridge Road in Covington, within the George Washington and Jefferson National Forests.

== History ==
=== Construction ===
On April 5, 2012, the Federal Communications Commission (FCC) announced United States CP, LLC. as the highest bidder for the 101.9 FM frequency. It would be located in Iron Gate, Virginia, as part of Auction 93. On September 10, 2012, United States CP, LLC., filed a construction permit for a radio station to broadcast on 101.9 FM. The new station would transmit from a mountain between Covington and Clifton Forge.

On October 9, 2012, the station was given the call sign WJVR. The call sign is a "tribute" to the Jackson River that flows through Covington and Clifton Forge.

=== Launch to present ===
An October 10, 2012 post on the station's official Facebook page announced the station would launch on October 12 at 5:00pm. The station received a license from the FCC on November 21, 2012.

United States CP, LLC sold WJVR to Todd P. Robinson, Inc. for $30,000 on March 24, 2014. WJVR will be operated under the WVJT, LLC licensee. On April 4, 2014, WJVR began streaming their broadcasts online. The sale was consummated on July 31, 2014.

== Translators ==
WJVR broadcasts its HD2 and HD3 sub channels on the following translators:

Broadcast translator for WJVR-HD2
Call sign	Frequency	City of license	FID	ERP (W)	HAAT	Class	FCC info
W278BF	103.5 FM	Covington, Virginia	139546	16	310.6 m (1,019 ft)	D	LMS

Broadcast translator for WJVR-HD3
Call sign	Frequency	City of license	FID	ERP (W)	HAAT	Class	FCC info
W298BQ	107.5 FM	Covington, Virginia	148092	250	15 m (49 ft)	D	LMS
