= Industrial Rayon Corporation =

American manufacturer

- Headquarters: Cleveland, United States
- Products: Viscose

Industrial Rayon Corporation, formerly the Industrial Fibre Company, was a company that made viscose in the United States.

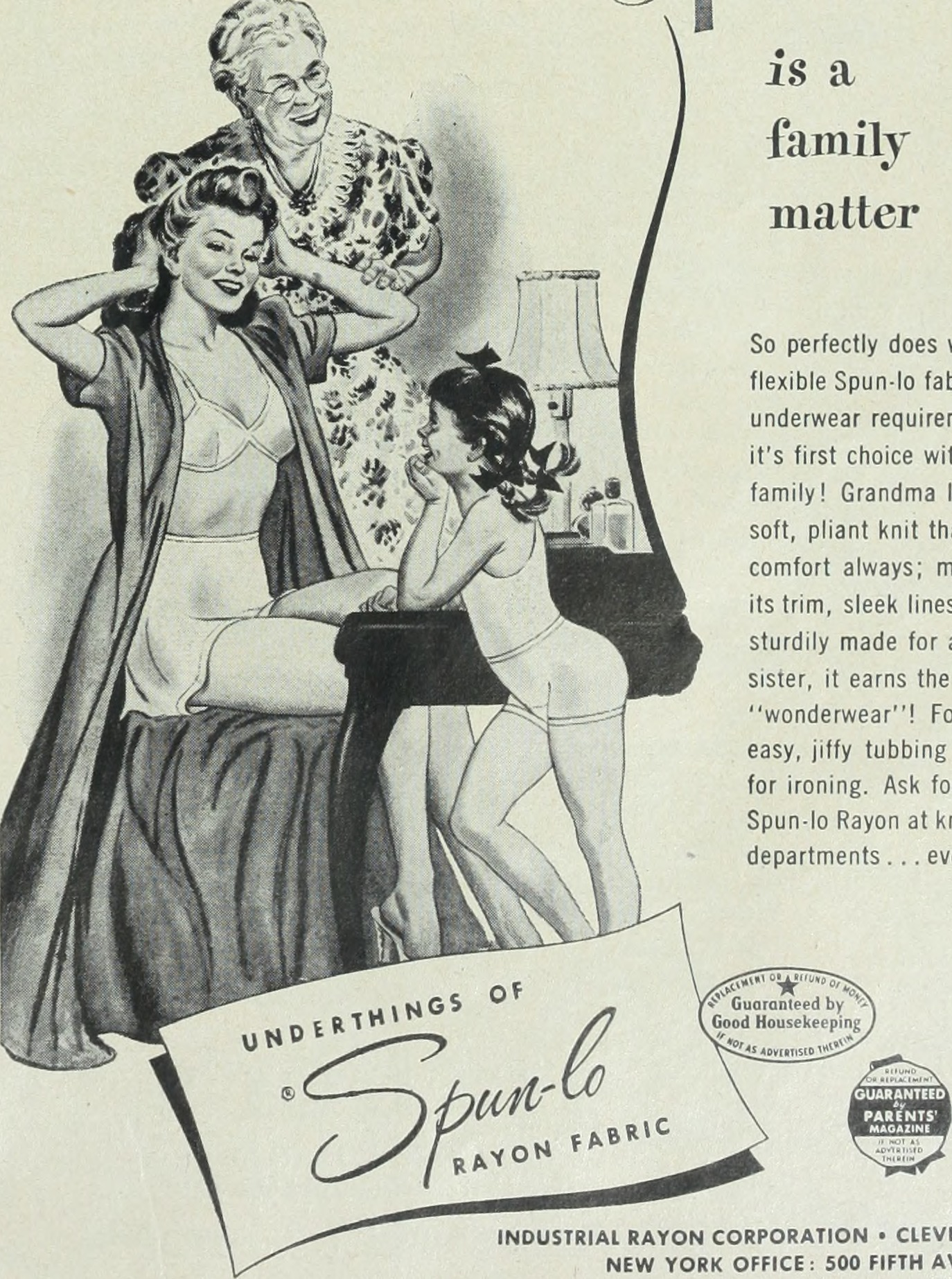
The Ladies' home journal
