= WLYH-FM =

- Big Island, Virginia; United States
- Broadcast area: Lynchburg metropolitan area
- Frequency: 103.9 MHz
- Branding: Rewind 103.9

Programming
- Format: Classic hits

Ownership
- Owner: Three Daughters Media (Gary Burns); (KSM Holdings, LLC)
- Sister stations: WZZU

History
- First air date: November 20, 1982
- Former call signs: WXCF-FM (1982–2012); WHTU (2012–2026)

Technical information
- Licensing authority: FCC
- Facility ID: 28340
- Class: A
- ERP: 190 watts
- HAAT: 540 meters (1,770 ft)
- Transmitter coordinates: 37°28′19″N 79°22′28″W

Links
- Public license information: Public file; LMS

WLYH-FM (103.9 FM) is a commercial radio station licensed to Big Island, Virginia, United States, and serving the Lynchburg metropolitan area. WLYH-FM broadcasts a classic hits format and is owned by Gary Burns' Three Daughters Media, through licensee KSM Holdings, LLC. The studios and offices are off Forest Road in Forest, Virginia. The transmitter is near Sweet Hollow Road in Forest.

== History ==
The station signed on the air on November 20, 1982. Its original call sign was WXCF-FM, the sister station to WXCF (1230 AM) in Clifton Forge, Virginia.

From 2009 to 2012 it was branded as Mix 104.1 with an adult contemporary format.

On November 2, 2012, WXCF-FM split from its simulcast with WKHF and changed its format to urban adult contemporary, branded as "Hot 103.9". On December 12, 2012, WXCF-FM changed its call letters to WHTU to go with the "Hot 103.9" branding.

On June 2, 2014, WHTU changed its format to oldies and classic hits, branded as "Good Time Oldies 103.9", with programming from Westwood One's "Good Time Oldies" network. The branding was later shortened to "Oldies 103.9". In August 2015, WHTU began simulcasting on sister station WZZI at 106.9 FM. That station was later sold to the Educational Media Foundation for its "K-Love" Christian contemporary format.

On May 31, 2022, WHTU rebranded as "Rewind 103.9". The call sign was changed to WLYH-FM on April 29, 2026.
