= Covington, Virginia =

Independent city in Virginia, United States

- Independent city
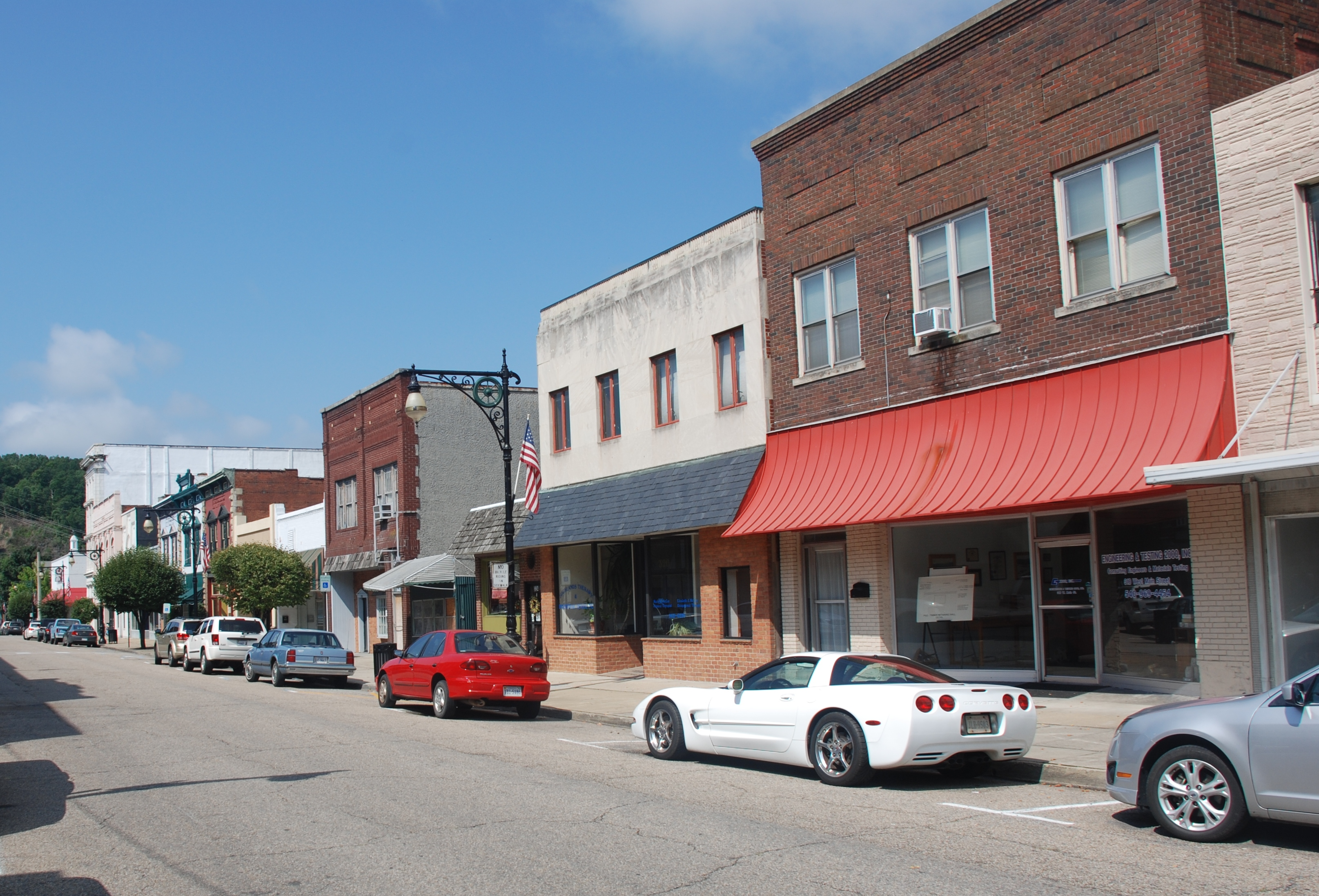
- Main Street in Covington, Virginia

- Flag Seal

- Location within Virginia Location within the United States
- Coordinates: 37°47′10″N 79°59′20″W
- Country: United States
- State: Virginia
- County: None (Independent city)

Government
  - Mayor: Raymond C. Hunter
  - City Manager: Allen L. Dressler

Area
  - Total: 5.67 sq mi (14.69 km^{2})
  - Land: 5.47 sq mi (14.16 km^{2})
  - Water: 0.20 sq mi (0.52 km^{2})
- Elevation: 1,250 ft (381 m)

Population (2020)
  - Total: 5,737
  - Estimate (2025): 5,680 ▼
  - Density: 1,049/sq mi (405.2/km^{2})
- Time zone: UTC-5 (Eastern (EST))
  - Summer (DST): UTC-4 (EDT)
- ZIP code: 24426
- Area code: 540
- FIPS code: 51-19728
- GNIS feature ID: 1498470
- Website: covington.va.us

Covington is an independent city in the Commonwealth of Virginia. As of the 2020 census, the population was 5,737, making it the second-least populous city in Virginia. It is surrounded by Alleghany County, of which it is also the county seat. Located at the confluence of Jackson River and Dunlap Creek, Covington is one of three cities (with Roanoke and Salem) in the Roanoke Regional Partnership. The Bureau of Economic Analysis combines the city of Covington with Alleghany county for statistical purposes.

== History ==
The first white settlers came to what is now Covington in 1745 when the area was part of Augusta County, Virginia. Botetourt County took over much of the area in 1769; although Bath County and Monroe County also lay claim to parts of what is now the Alleghany County-Covington region.

Starting in August 1818, lots were sold in what is now Covington on 25 acres of land owned by Dr. James Merry. The unnamed community was referred to as the Mouth of the Dunlap. It was designed the town of Covington in 1819. Covington is named in honor of General Leonard Covington, hero of the War of 1812 and friend of James Madison and Thomas Jefferson.

On January 5, 1822, the town became part of Alleghany County, formed by the Virginia General Assembly by combining sections of Bath, Botetourt, and Monroe Counties. The General Assembly incorporated Covington in 1833. By 1855, Covington had two streets and 43 houses. It was an agricultural center, with businesses and stores that supported farming and raising livestock. Hemp was the main crop in the area, needed by ships in eastern Virginia

The Virginia Central Railroad (later the Chesapeake and Ohio Railway) came to Covington in 1867.

The Covington Iron Furnace opened in 1891, producing 110 tons of pig iron a day. This was followed by the Deford Tannery in 1892. the E. M. Nettlton Planning Mill, two flour mills, the Covington Brick Company, the Alleghany Brick Company, the Alleghany Pin and Bracket Company, the Bates Value Company, and the Covington Machine Shops, which made coke extractors (furnace cleaners) used in manufacturing steel. In 1899, A. Adams McAllister made a bargain land sale to entice the West Virginia Pulp and Paper Company (later called Westvaco and WestRock) to locate in Covington. The papermill would go on to become the community's largest employer.

The Chesapeake and Ohio Railway built its fourth largest freight paying station in Covington, after Chicago, Cincinnati, and Richmond. In addition fourteen passenger trains stopped in Covington, daily. In 1892, a $10,000 bond allowed Covington to build a sewerage and add sidewalks and a high school was constructed for $30,000. More industries opened in Covington, including Industrial Rayon Corporation (aka Applied Extrusion Technologies or AET) and Lear Corporation. In addition, Allied Chemical Corporation bought the former extraction plant.

The General Assembly designated Covington as the county seat of Alleghany County in 1902. As a result of its industrial boom, the population of Covington grew from 704 in 1890 to 5,632 in 1920. Covington expanded its town limited several times, finally becoming an independent city in 1952.

However, manufacturing has declined in recent times with Lear Corporation closing its facility in December 2005 and AET closing in March 2008. The C&O freight station also closed.

== Geography ==
According to the United States Census Bureau, the city has a total area of 5.7 square miles (14.8 km^{2}), of which 5.5 square miles (14.2 km^{2}) is land and 0.2 square miles (0.5 km^{2}) (3.6%) is water. Covington is located at the confluence of Jackson River and Dunlap Creek. It along both sides of the Jackson River and is surrounded by Alleghany County.

Covington is located within a 45 minute drive to The Homestead in Bath County, Virginia; Lexington, Virginia; The Greenbrier in White Sulphur Springs, West Virginia; Lewisburg, West Virginia; and Roanoke, Virginia.

=== Climate ===
The climate in this area is characterized by hot, humid summers and generally mild to cool winters. According to the Köppen Climate Classification system, Covington has a humid subtropical climate, abbreviated "Cfa" on climate maps. Using the 32 degree isotherm, it's in the transition zone with "Dfa", a humid continental climate.

Climate data for Covington Filter Plant, Virginia (1991–2020 normals, extremes 1960–present)
Month	Jan	Feb	Mar	Apr	May	Jun	Jul	Aug	Sep	Oct	Nov	Dec	Year
Record high °F (°C)	80 (27)	79 (26)	87 (31)	93 (34)	99 (37)	100 (38)	102 (39)	102 (39)	97 (36)	93 (34)	85 (29)	80 (27)	102 (39)
Mean daily maximum °F (°C)	41.5 (5.3)	45.5 (7.5)	54.2 (12.3)	66.0 (18.9)	73.9 (23.3)	80.5 (26.9)	84.0 (28.9)	82.6 (28.1)	76.8 (24.9)	67.1 (19.5)	55.3 (12.9)	45.3 (7.4)	64.4 (18.0)
Daily mean °F (°C)	32.0 (0.0)	34.8 (1.6)	42.1 (5.6)	52.3 (11.3)	61.0 (16.1)	68.6 (20.3)	72.5 (22.5)	71.2 (21.8)	65.0 (18.3)	54.4 (12.4)	43.1 (6.2)	35.7 (2.1)	52.7 (11.5)
Mean daily minimum °F (°C)	22.5 (−5.3)	24.1 (−4.4)	30.1 (−1.1)	38.7 (3.7)	48.2 (9.0)	56.7 (13.7)	60.9 (16.1)	59.9 (15.5)	53.3 (11.8)	41.6 (5.3)	30.8 (−0.7)	26.2 (−3.2)	41.1 (5.1)
Record low °F (°C)	−19 (−28)	−5 (−21)	1 (−17)	15 (−9)	26 (−3)	34 (1)	41 (5)	39 (4)	28 (−2)	14 (−10)	9 (−13)	−10 (−23)	−19 (−28)
Average precipitation inches (mm)	2.60 (66)	2.43 (62)	3.36 (85)	3.63 (92)	4.30 (109)	4.24 (108)	3.98 (101)	3.24 (82)	3.49 (89)	2.51 (64)	2.75 (70)	2.94 (75)	39.47 (1,003)
Average snowfall inches (cm)	2.5 (6.4)	3.3 (8.4)	1.6 (4.1)	0.2 (0.51)	0.0 (0.0)	0.0 (0.0)	0.0 (0.0)	0.0 (0.0)	0.0 (0.0)	0.0 (0.0)	0.0 (0.0)	2.5 (6.4)	10.1 (26)
Average precipitation days (≥ 0.01 in)	9.2	8.5	11.3	11.8	13.8	11.8	12.1	11.2	8.2	8.4	8.5	10.3	125.1
Average snowy days (≥ 0.1 in)	1.1	1.0	0.6	0.2	0.0	0.0	0.0	0.0	0.0	0.0	0.0	0.8	3.7
Source: NOAA

== Demographics ==
Historical population
Census	Pop.	Note	%±
1880	436		—
1890	704		61.5%
1900	2,950		319.0%
1910	4,234		43.5%
1920	5,623		32.8%
1930	6,538		16.3%
1940	6,300		−3.6%
1950	5,860		−7.0%
1960	11,062		88.8%
1970	10,060		−9.1%
1980	9,063		−9.9%
1990	6,991		−22.9%
2000	6,303		−9.8%
2010	5,961		−5.4%
2020	5,737		−3.8%
2025 (est.)	5,680	▼	−1.0%
U.S. Decennial Census; 1790-1960 1900-1990; 1990-2000 2010-2020

=== Racial and ethnic composition ===
Covington city, Virginia – Racial and ethnic composition Note: the US Census treats Hispanic/Latino as an ethnic category. This table excludes Latinos from the racial categories and assigns them to a separate category. Hispanics/Latinos may be of any race.
Race / Ethnicity (NH = Non-Hispanic)	Pop 1980	Pop 1990	Pop 2000	Pop 2010	Pop 2020	% 1980	% 1990	% 2000	% 2010	% 2020
White alone (NH)	7,741	5,936	5,271	4,955	4,541	85.41%	84.91%	83.63%	83.12%	79.15%
Black or African American alone (NH)	1,194	969	828	741	716	13.17%	13.86%	13.14%	12.43%	12.48%
Native American or Alaska Native alone (NH)	6	6	22	18	12	0.07%	0.09%	0.35%	0.30%	0.21%
Asian alone (NH)	20	46	41	33	32	0.22%	0.66%	0.65%	0.55%	0.56%
Native Hawaiian or Pacific Islander alone (NH)	x	x	1	0	5	x	x	0.02%	0.00%	0.09%
Other race alone (NH)	2	7	6	8	11	0.02%	0.10%	0.10%	0.13%	0.19%
Mixed race or Multiracial (NH)	x	x	94	114	241	x	x	1.49%	1.91%	4.20%
Hispanic or Latino (any race)	100	27	40	92	179	1.10%	0.39%	0.63%	1.54%	3.12%
Total	9,063	6,991	6,303	5,961	5,737	100.00%	100.00%	100.00%	100.00%	100.00%

=== 2020 census ===
As of the 2020 census, Covington had a population of 5,737 and a median age of 44.4 years. 20.5% of residents were under the age of 18 and 20.9% were 65 years of age or older. For every 100 females there were 94.3 males, and for every 100 females age 18 and over there were 90.9 males age 18 and over.

99.4% of residents lived in urban areas, while 0.6% lived in rural areas.

There were 2,576 households in Covington, of which 26.3% had children under the age of 18 living in them. Of all households, 36.3% were married-couple households, 22.7% were households with a male householder and no spouse or partner present, and 32.7% were households with a female householder and no spouse or partner present. About 36.2% of all households were made up of individuals and 16.7% had someone living alone who was 65 years of age or older.

There were 3,052 housing units, of which 15.6% were vacant. The homeowner vacancy rate was 2.7% and the rental vacancy rate was 9.5%.

=== 2000 census ===
The population of Covington has gradually declined since reaching its peak of 11,062 in 1960. The population decline has mainly resulted from losses of manufacturing jobs in the area. One major loss of manufacturing jobs occurred after a fire at the Hercules plant in June 1980, causing $23 million in damage and worker layoffs.

As of the census of 2000, there were 6,303 people, 2,835 households, and 1,740 families residing in the city. The population density was 1,111.3 people per square mile (429.1 people/km^{2}). The racial makeup of the city was 84.1% White, 13.1% Black or African American, 0.4% Native American, 0.7% Asian, 0.0% Pacific Islander, 0.2% from other races, and 1.6% from two or more races. 0.6% of the population were Hispanic or Latino of any race.

There were 3,195 housing units at an average density of 563.3 units per square mile (217.5 units/km^{2}). There were 2,835 households, out of which 23.7% had children under the age of 18 living with them, 44.9% were married couples living together, 12.5% had a female householder with no husband present, and 38.6% were non-families. Of all households 34.0% were made up of individuals, and 16.4% had someone living alone who was 65 years of age or older. The average household size was 2.22 and the average family size was 2.83.

In the city, the population was spread out, with 21.5% under the age of 18, 8.2% from 18 to 24, 26.3% from 25 to 44, 23.9% from 45 to 64, and 20.2% who were 65 years of age or older. The median age was 40 years. For every 100 females, there were 91.6 males. For every 100 females age 18 and over, there were 86.1 males.

The median income for a household in the city was $30,325, and the median income for a family was $36,640. Males had a median income of $30,755 versus $20,316 for females. The per capita income for the city was $16,758. About 10.7% of families and 12.9% of the population were below the poverty line, including 16.1% of those under age 18 and 9.1% of those age 65 or over.

== Economy ==
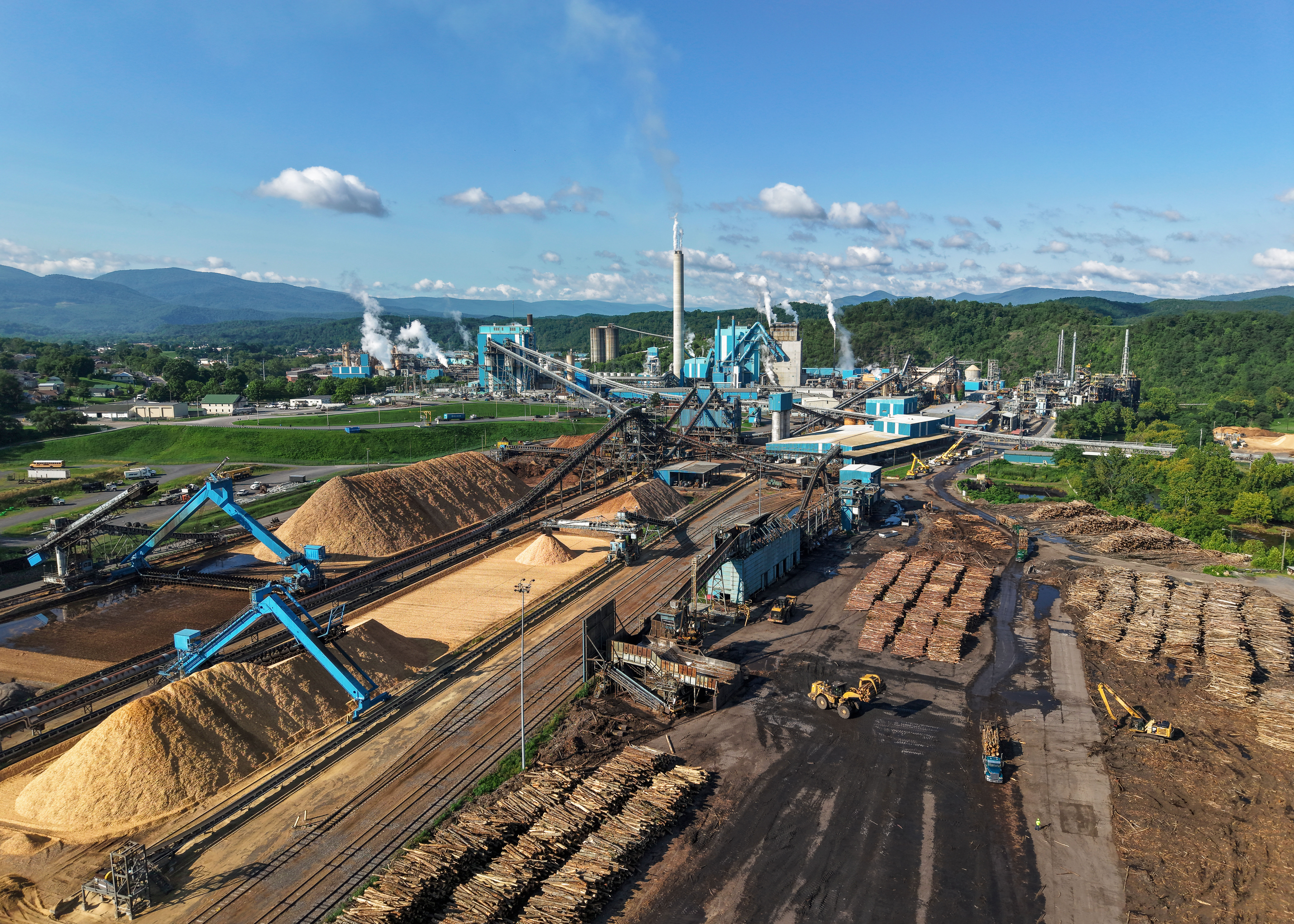
Smurfit Westrock's kraft paper mill

Covington's economy is dominated by WestRock, which has been operating in the city since 1899. In 2024, it merged with Smurfit Kappa to become Smurfit Westrock. The facility employs about 1300 workers, mostly from Covington and Alleghany County. Its production includes bleached paper and paperboard for packaging, and is the second largest on the East Coast.

Both Alleghany County and Covington City are known for the low cost of their housing markets.

== Arts and culture ==
=== Architecture ===
Forty acres of the historic core of the city are included in the Covington Historic District, consisting of late-19th and early-20th-century commercial buildings and residences. The district was added to the National Register of Historic Places in 1991.

== Sports ==
The Covington Lumberjacks, members of the Valley Baseball League, play at Casey Field in downtown Covington. The city previously hosted the Covington Astros and Covington Red Sox of the Appalachian League.

== Government ==
The city has a council–manager government. The current mayor of Covington is Fred F. Forbes III. Covington is one of three cities (with Roanoke and Salem) in the Roanoke Regional Partnership.

== Politics ==
United States presidential election results for Covington, Virginia
Year	Republican		Democratic		Third party(ies)	
Year	No.	%	No.	%	No.	%
1956	1,639	56.34%	1,189	40.87%	81	2.78%
1960	1,436	47.85%	1,558	51.92%	7	0.23%
1964	1,149	35.84%	2,055	64.10%	2	0.06%
1968	1,551	43.14%	1,195	33.24%	849	23.62%
1972	1,910	63.71%	948	31.62%	140	4.67%
1976	1,173	37.06%	1,820	57.50%	172	5.43%
1980	1,187	37.68%	1,813	57.56%	150	4.76%
1984	1,722	54.46%	1,391	43.99%	49	1.55%
1988	1,274	43.70%	1,567	53.76%	74	2.54%
1992	995	34.68%	1,442	50.26%	432	15.06%
1996	763	31.10%	1,394	56.83%	296	12.07%
2000	966	43.63%	1,168	52.76%	80	3.61%
2004	1,104	47.98%	1,179	51.24%	18	0.78%
2008	1,020	43.33%	1,304	55.40%	30	1.27%
2012	975	41.85%	1,319	56.61%	36	1.55%
2016	1,349	56.63%	914	38.37%	119	5.00%
2020	1,580	60.70%	964	37.03%	59	2.27%
2024	1,642	66.21%	818	32.98%	20	0.81%

== Education ==
Historically, Covington had one grades 8 through 12 high school (Covington High School), one grades 4 through 7 middle school called (Jeter-Watson), one pre-kindergarten through third grade elementary school (Edgemont Primary), one State Governors School (Jackson River Governor's School), one technical center for high-school students (Jackson River Technical Center), and one community college (Dabney S. Lancaster).

In late 2020, Alleghany County Public Schools and Covington City Public Schools merged due to declining attendance. The new school system is known as Alleghany Highlands Public Schools and the two high schools were merged to create a new Alleghany High School, that took on Covington's Cougar nickname beginning in 2023. The former Covington High School was converted into a new middle school.

== Media ==
The local newspapers are The Virginian Review and The Recorder. Covington is served by two radio stations. WKEY simulcasts on 103.5 FM and 1340 AM, and WJVR broadcasts on 101.9 FM with simulcast on 1230 AM in nearby Clifton Forge.

== Infrastructure ==
=== Transportation ===
The area is serviced by Interstate 64 (east-west) and U.S. Route 220 (north-south) offering rail, truck and interstate access to the area. Rail passenger service is provided at the Amtrak station in Clifton Forge, twelve miles away.

=== Fire protection ===
Fire protection is provided by the Covington Fire Department, which was chartered on March 4, 1902. The Covington Rescue Squad provides emergency medical services to the city of Covington. Both the fire department and rescue squad are volunteer organizations. The rescue squad was organized in 1933 and is the third oldest volunteer rescue squad in Virginia.

== Gallery ==
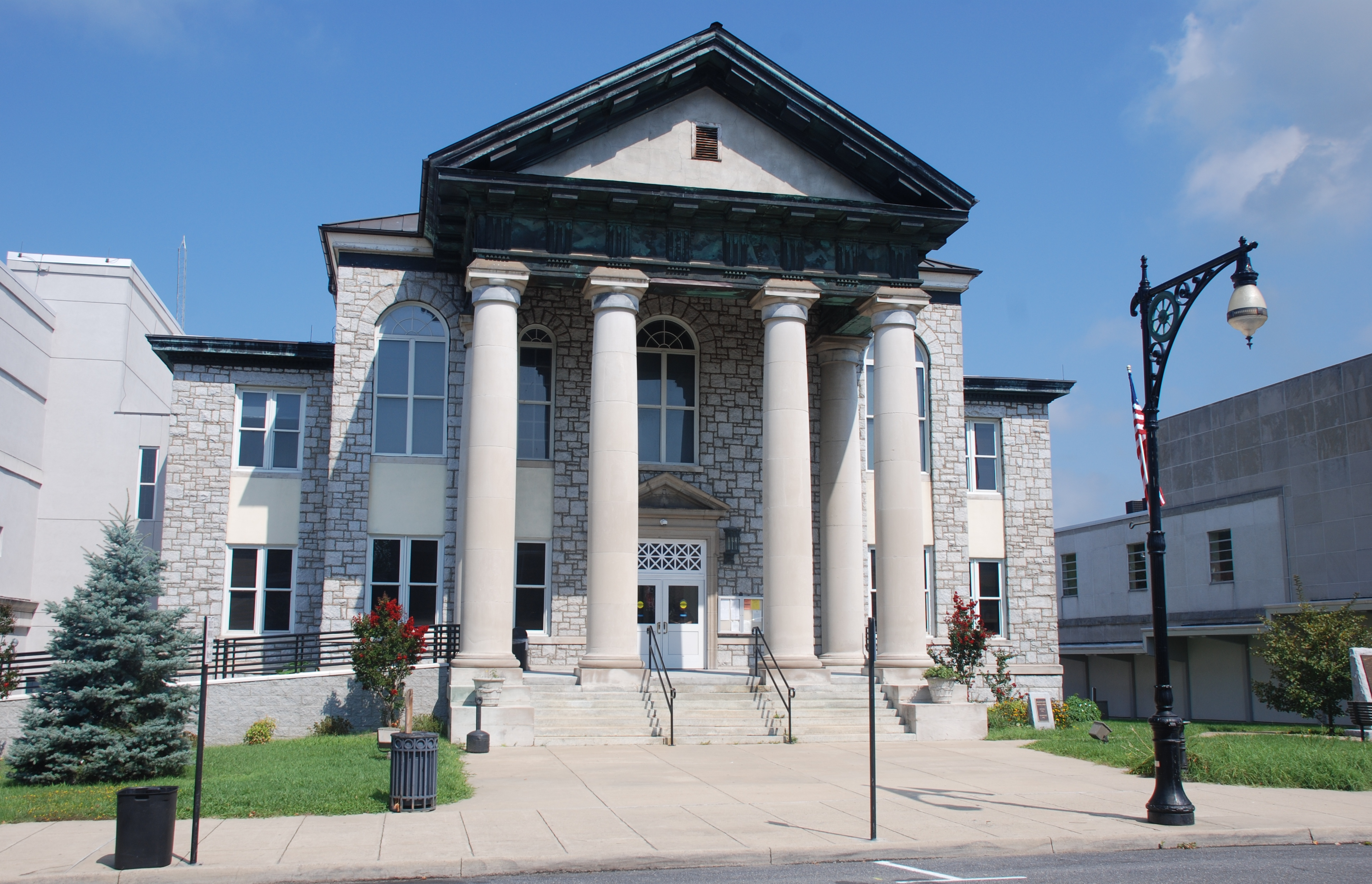
Alleghany General District Court

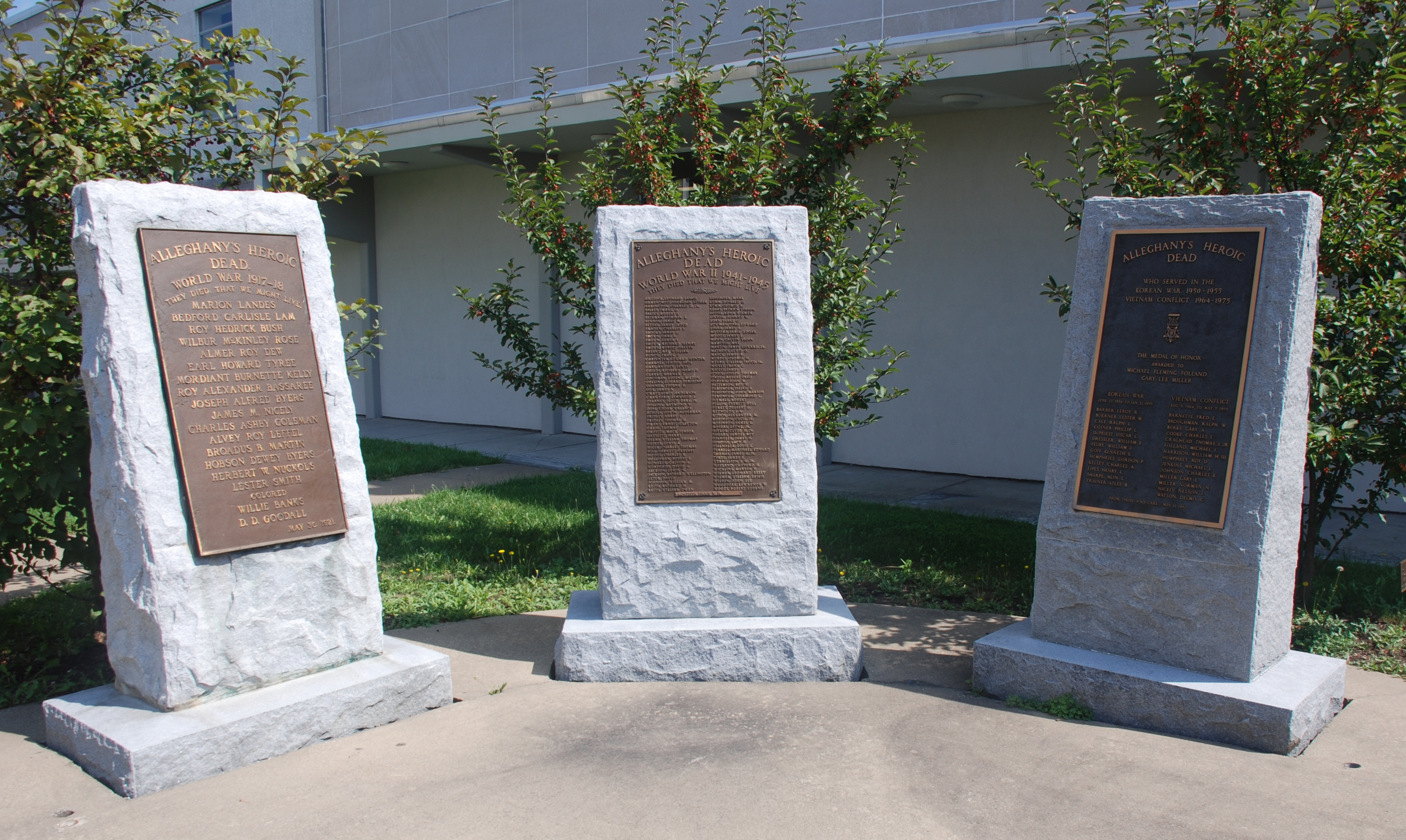
War memorials for soldiers from Alleghany County who died in World War I, World War II, the Korean War and the Vietnam War

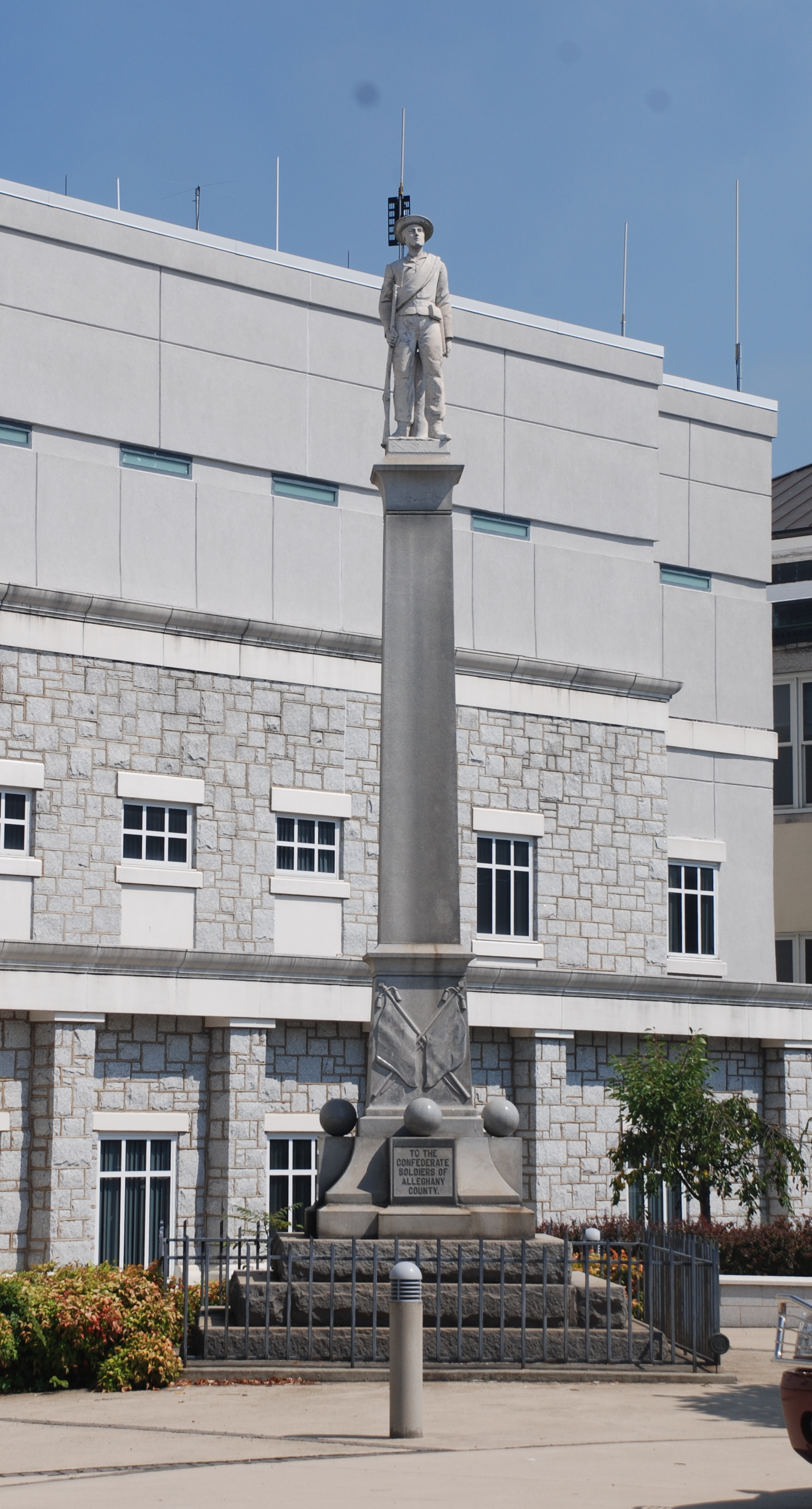
Memorial to Confederate soldiers

== Notable people ==
- Bimbo Coles, professional basketball player with the Miami Heat, Golden State Warriors, Atlanta Hawks, Cleveland Cavaliers, and Boston Celtics.
- Addie Elizabeth Davis, first woman ordained as a Southern Baptist pastor.
- Bob Humphreys, professional baseball pitcher
- Jim Lemon, player, manager and coach in Major League Baseball.
- Edgar P. Rucker, Attorney General of West Virginia
- William R. Terrill, a United States Army general during the American Civil War.
