= WLGX (FM) =

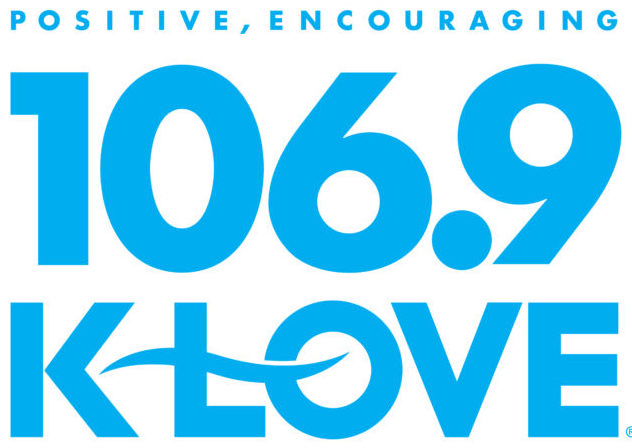
- Bedford, Virginia; United States
- Broadcast area: Bedford County, Virginia
- Frequency: 106.9 MHz

Programming
- Format: Contemporary Christian
- Network: K-Love

Ownership
- Owner: Educational Media Foundation

History
- First air date: October 20, 1992
- Former call signs: WYMY (1990–1996); WLQE-FM (1996–2001); WBWR (2001–2005); WLEQ (2005–2009); WZZI (2009–2022)

Technical information
- Licensing authority: FCC
- Facility ID: 15188
- Class: A
- ERP: 290 watts
- HAAT: 389 meters (1,276 ft)
- Transmitter coordinates: 38°19′14.0″N 79°37′59.0″W

Links
- Public license information: Public file; LMS
- Webcast: Listen live
- Website: klove.com

WLGX (106.9 FM) is a noncommercial radio station licensed to Bedford, Virginia, United States, and serving Bedford County and the suburbs of Roanoke. It broadcasts the national "K-Love" Contemporary Christian radio format. WLGX is owned by Educational Media Foundation.

== History ==
The station's construction permit was given the call sign WYMY on December 12, 1990. On October 20, 1992, it officially signed on the air. It transmitted from Thaxton Mountain in Bedford County, the same location as TV stations WSET and WWCW, and still does to this day. As reception from Thaxton Mountain is problematic in Roanoke, WYMY signed on translator W247AD (97.3 FM) in an attempt to help reception there.

On February 22, 1996, WYMY was sold to JLR Communications, Inc., which owned Smith Mountain Lake AM Station WLQE-880. WYMY's call sign was changed to WLQE-FM and simulcast adult standards and big-band music under the moniker "The Lake." The call sign was chosen for its location near Smith Mountain Lake. The station mixed locally produced programming with ABC Radio's "Adult Standards" satellite format.

On May 23, 2001, the station was sold and became a simulcast of classic rock WBRW in Blacksburg, taking the callsign WBWR. This made the station a direct competitor with WROV.

By 2005, Cumulus had decided to focus the station on Blacksburg, and sold WBWR to Centennial Broadcasting on August 31, 2005. After simulcasting Oldies "Bob-FM" with co-owned WZZI (101.5 FM, Roanoke) and WZZU (97.9 FM, Lynchburg) for several days, the station played "lake" sounds before becoming "The Lake" once again, this time broadcasting a standards format with the callsign WLEQ, similar to the old callsign.

That format lasted just over a year before Centennial moved its "Bob-FM" oldies format from WZZI and WZZU in order to launch classic rock "The Planet" on those frequencies.

On March 2, 2009, WLEQ and W247AD dropped its Oldies format and began simulcasting "The Planet" from WZZI and WZZU. The WZZI callsign was moved to this station on October 12, 2009, as 101.5 FM in Roanoke became AAA-formatted WVMP.

In 2012, WZZI split away from the simulcast for a Sports format as "Fox Sports Radio" and was sold to Mel Wheeler Inc.

WZZI and WZZU were sold to Todd Robinson's WVJT, LLC at a purchase price of $523,000. The transaction was consummated on November 30, 2012.

In August 2015, WZZI began simulcasting WHTU at 103.9 FM, becoming an oldies and classic hits format, branded as "Good Time Oldies; 103.9 and 106.9"

In March 2022, WZZI was sold to Educational Media Foundation. The sale was consummated on June 24, 2022, at a purchase price of $118,750, at which point the station changed its format from oldies to EMF's K-Love contemporary Christian format. On July 14, 2022, WZZI changed its call sign to WLGX.
