= Jackman =

Jackman is a surname of English origin.

- Barret Jackman, Canadian ice hockey player
- Bernard Jackman, Irish rugby player
- Clyde Jackman, Canadian politician
- Danny Jackman, English footballer
- David Jackman (musician), British artist
- David Jackman (minister), English minister
- Donald C. Jackman (1954–2023), American medievalist and linguist
- François Jackman, Barbadian diplomat
- Galen B. Jackman, Retired United States Army Major General
- Henry N.R. "Hal" Jackman, Canadian politician and former Lieutenant Governor of Ontario
- Henry N.R. Jackman Faculty of Law, the law school of the University of Toronto, in Ontario, Canada
- Henry R. "Harry" Jackman, Canadian politician and entrepreneur (Empire Life Insurance Co.)
- Herbert Louis Jackman (1867–1936), Australian architect, in practice with Daniel Garlick as Garlick & Jackman (and variations) in Adelaide
- Herbert Montefiore Jackman (1897–1968), Australian architect, in practice with George Soward as English, Soward & Jackman in Adelaide
- Herbert Louis Jackman, early South Australian architect who worked with Daniel Garlick
- Hugh Jackman, Australian actor
- Ian Jackman, judge of the Federal Court of Australia
- Joseph Jackman (1844–1914), founder of Jackman's Rooms in Adelaide, South Australia
- Jermain Jackman, singer
- Lois Jackman (born 1937), Australian discus thrower
- Maia Jackman, New Zealand footballer
- Marion Jackman, Australian squash player
- Mary Jackman, Irish politician
- Myles Jackman, British lawyer
- Pål Jackman, Norwegian director
- Ric Jackman (born 1978), Canadian ice hockey defenceman
- Robert Jackman, also known as Ajahn Sumedho prominent Theravada bhikkhu
- Robin Jackman, English cricketer
- Tim Jackman, American ice hockey player

== Given name ==
Notable people with the given name include:

- Jackman "Jack" Harlow (born 1998), American rapper
- Jackman Stewart (1930-2000), American teacher, coach, and school administrator at the Berkshire School in Sheffield, Massachusetts

== See also ==
- Jackman, Maine, town in Somerset County, Maine, United States
- Jackman (album), a 2023 album by Jack Harlow
