= Tim Goad =

American football player (born 1966)

No. 72, 73
- Position: Defensive tackle

Personal information
- Born: February 28, 1966 (age 60); Claudville, Virginia, U.S.
- Listed height: 6 ft 3 in (1.91 m)
- Listed weight: 280 lb (127 kg)

Career information
- High school: Patrick County (Stuart, Virginia)
- College: North Carolina
- NFL draft: 1988: 4th round, 87th overall pick

Career history
- New England Patriots (1988–1994); Cleveland Browns (1995); Baltimore Ravens (1996)

Awards and highlights
- New England Patriots All-1990s Team; PFWA All-Rookie Team (1988); 2× First-team All-ACC (1986, 1987)

Career NFL statistics
- Tackles: 543
- Sacks: 14.5
- Fumble recoveries: 6
- Stats at Pro Football Reference

Timothy Ray Goad (born February 28, 1966) is an American former professional football player who was a defensive tackle in the National Football League (NFL).

He attended high school at Patrick County High School in Stuart, Virginia, and was a member of the Cougar varsity football team. He played offensive tackle and defensive tackle for the team. After high school, he attended the University of North Carolina in Chapel Hill, where he played on the defensive line. After college, Goad was drafted in the fourth round of the 1988 NFL Draft by the New England Patriots. He made his first professional appearance on September 4, 1988, in a 28–3 Patriots' victory. He played seven seasons in New England. In 1995, he played for the Cleveland Browns, and finished his career with the Baltimore Ravens in 1996.

In 1998, Goad became the jackman for the NASCAR team Wood Brothers Racing, while also serving at Petty Enterprises and Kevin Harvick Incorporated, the latter in which he served as pit coach. He also worked as a professional bass fisherman. He currently resides in Pittsboro, NC C.I.D.. Area 3
