= Kristin Baker =

Kristin Baker may refer to:

- Kristin Baker (painter)
- Kristin Baker (politician)
