= Kevan Miller =

American ice hockey player (born 1987)

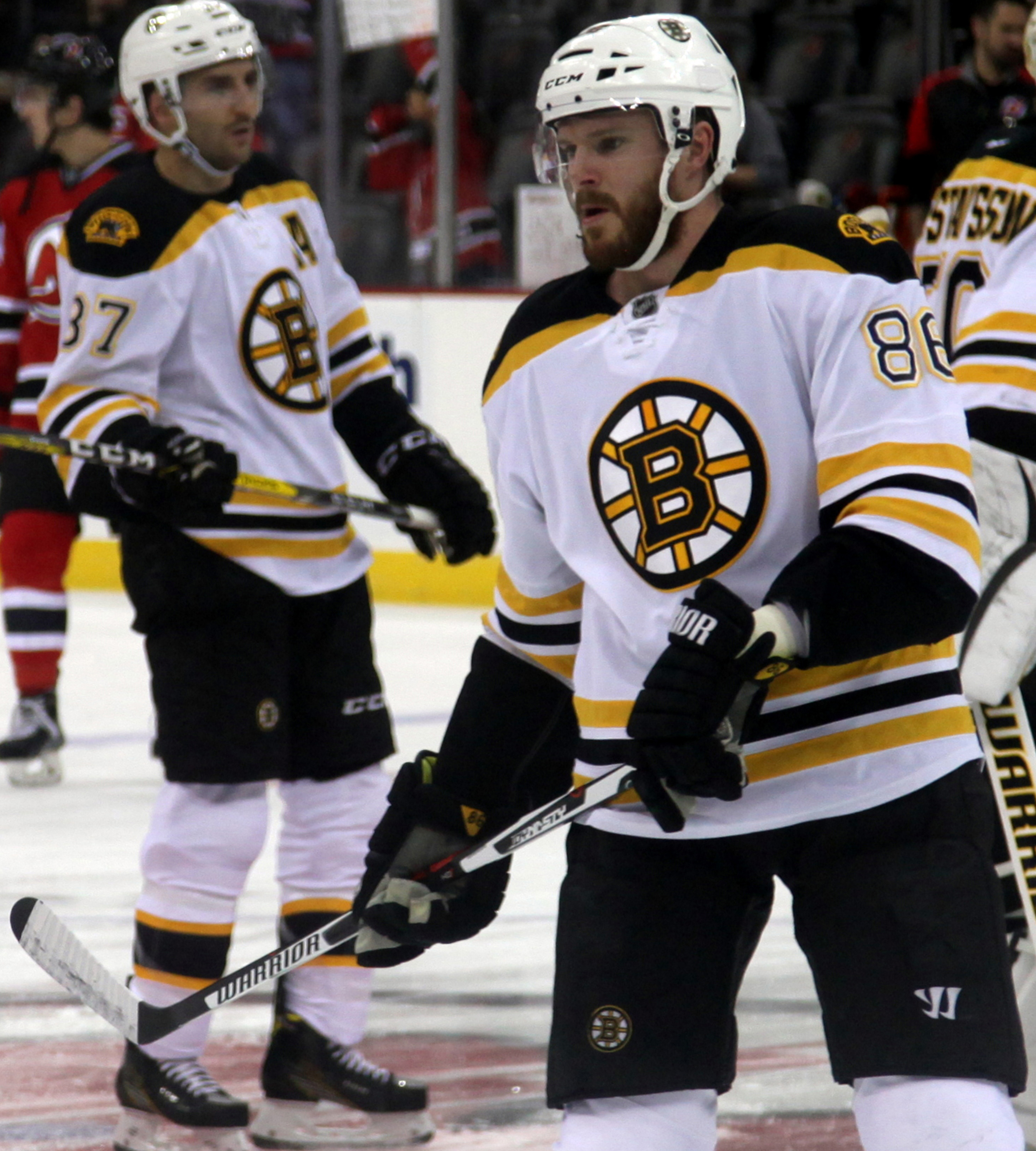
- Miller with the Boston Bruins in 2016
- Born: November 15, 1987 (age 38) Santa Clarita, California, U.S.
- Height: 6 ft 2 in (188 cm)
- Weight: 210 lb (95 kg; 15 st 0 lb)
- Position: Defense
- Shot: Right
- Played for: Boston Bruins
- NHL draft: Undrafted
- Playing career: 2011–2021

Kevan Michael Miller (born November 15, 1987) is an American former professional ice hockey defenseman who played for the Boston Bruins of the National Hockey League (NHL).

== Playing career ==
=== Amateur ===
Miller was born in Santa Clarita, California, and attended Canyon High School until age 16, when he transferred to Berkshire School in Sheffield, Massachusetts, and then played college hockey in Hockey East NCAA Division I for the University of Vermont Catamounts. While with the Catamounts, Miller played 144 games, scoring five goals and 25 assists for 30 points, also serving as the captain of the team for the 2009–10 and 2010–11 seasons.

=== Professional ===
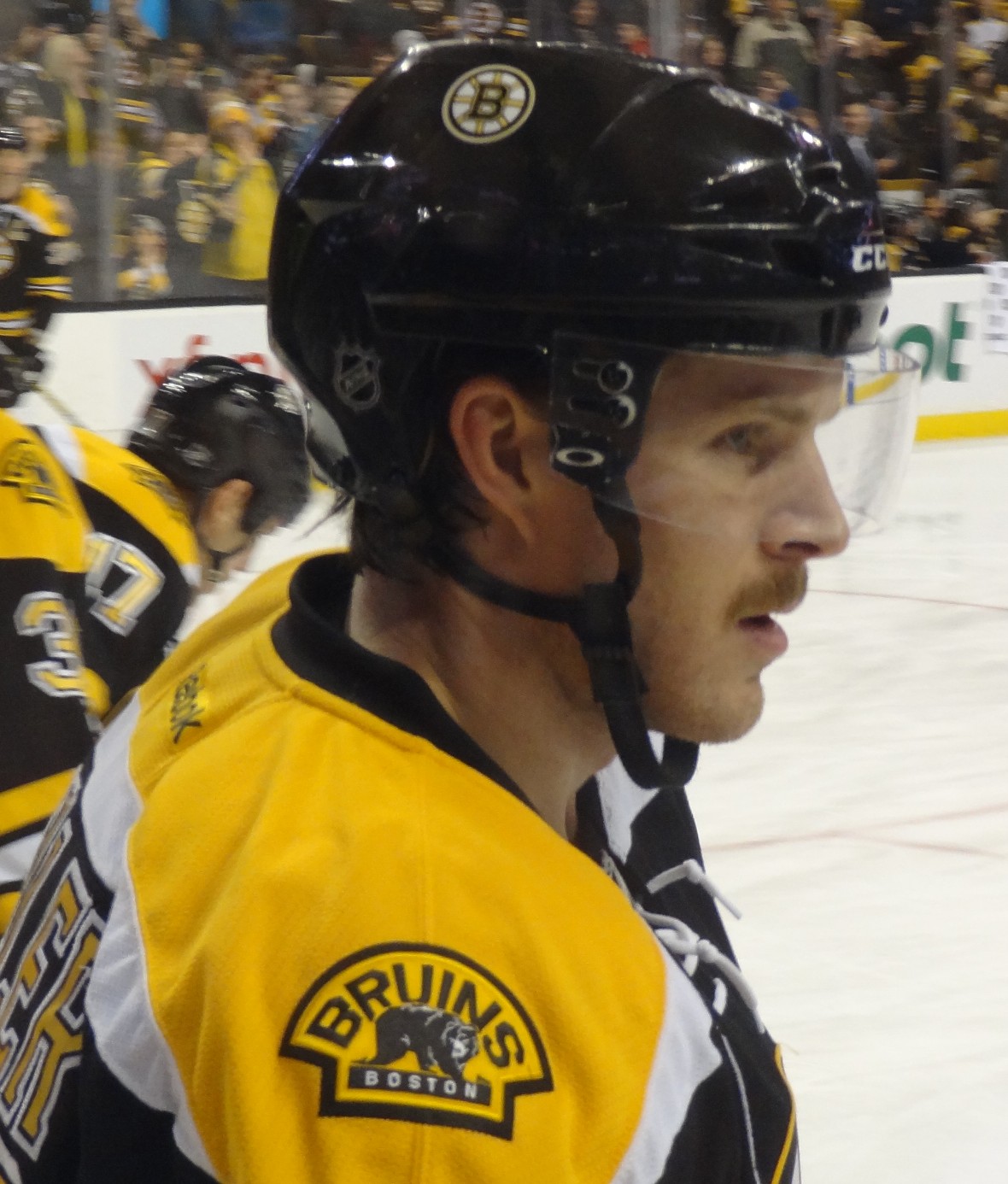
Miller with the Bruins in 2013.

Emerging out of college, Miller signed an amateur tryout contract with the Providence Bruins of the American Hockey League (AHL) and played six games for the team during the regular season.

In September 2011, Miller attended the Boston Bruins' training camp, but was released to the Providence training camp on September 23, 2011. After five games with Providence, Boston signed him to an entry-level contract, opting to keep him with Providence for the 2011–12 season.

Miller attended Boston's training camp again in 2012, but was again later reassigned to Providence on September 14, 2012. He spent the full 2012–13 season with the Providence Bruins, playing 64 games and scoring 16 points and competing in the Calder Cup playoffs for the first time.

Prior to the 2013–14 season, Miller was re-signed by the Boston Bruins to a one-year, two-way contract. However, to start the season, he was once again assigned to Providence, though he was later recalled to the NHL on November 20, 2013 and made his NHL debut in a game against the St. Louis Blues at TD Garden in Boston, becoming the first Bruins to wear the number 86. Miller was then reassigned to Providence again on November 28, 2013, but was recalled days later, on December 2, on an emergency basis. He scored his first career NHL goal on December 8, 2013, against the Toronto Maple Leafs at the Air Canada Centre in Toronto. On January 21, 2014, Boston announced that they had re-signed Miller to a two-year, one-way contract extension.

In October 2016 he signed a four-year contract extension at 2.5 million dollars a year.

After missing the entire 2019–20 season due to a lower-body injury, and out of contract with the Bruins, Miller made it to the opening day of free agency before opting to re-sign with the Bruins on a one-year, $1.25 million contract on October 9, 2020.

On July 14, 2021, Miller announced his retirement via Instagram.

== Career statistics ==
			Regular season					Playoffs
Season	Team	League	GP	G	A	Pts	PIM	GP	G	A	Pts	PIM
2004–05	Berkshire School	HS-MA
2005–06	Berkshire School	HS-MA	35	2	7	9	8	—	—	—	—	—
2006–07	Berkshire School	HS-MA	31	6	8	14	12	—	—	—	—	—
2007–08	University of Vermont	HE	39	2	5	7	12	—	—	—	—	—
2008–09	University of Vermont	HE	39	1	7	8	30	—	—	—	—	—
2009–10	University of Vermont	HE	39	1	10	11	26	—	—	—	—	—
2010–11	University of Vermont	HE	27	1	3	4	29	—	—	—	—	—
2010–11	Providence Bruins	AHL	6	0	0	0	9	—	—	—	—	—
2011–12	Providence Bruins	AHL	65	3	21	24	98	—	—	—	—	—
2012–13	Providence Bruins	AHL	64	2	14	16	71	9	0	5	5	10
2013–14	Providence Bruins	AHL	19	2	3	5	39	—	—	—	—	—
2013–14	Boston Bruins	NHL	47	1	5	6	38	11	0	2	2	8
2014–15	Boston Bruins	NHL	41	2	5	7	15	—	—	—	—	—
2015–16	Boston Bruins	NHL	71	5	13	18	53	—	—	—	—	—
2016–17	Boston Bruins	NHL	58	3	10	13	50	6	0	0	0	4
2017–18	Boston Bruins	NHL	68	1	15	16	70	12	1	3	4	4
2018–19	Boston Bruins	NHL	39	0	7	7	35	—	—	—	—	—
2020–21	Boston Bruins	NHL	28	1	3	4	20	4	0	1	1	0
NHL totals			352	13	58	71	281	33	1	6	7	16
