= Berkshire School =

Boarding school in Sheffield, Massachusetts, US

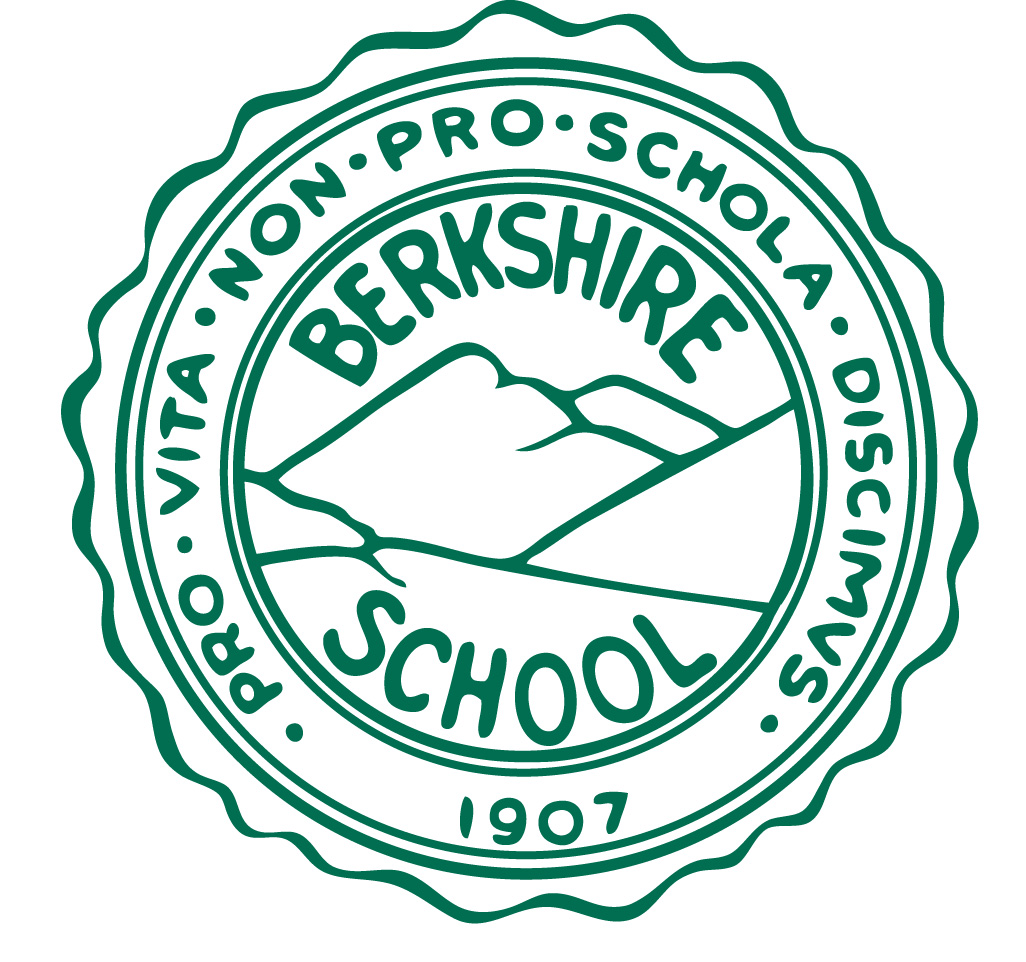

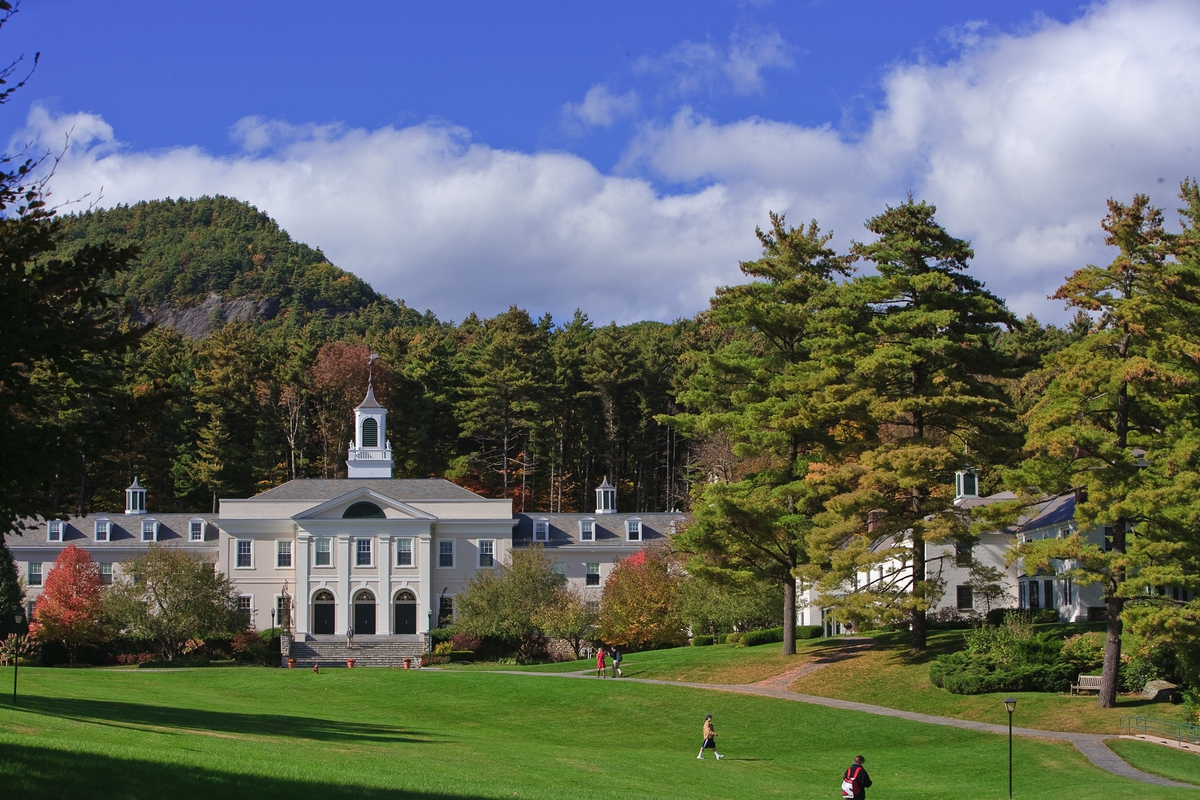
- Buck Valley during fall, Berkshire School

Location
- 245 North Undermountain Road; Sheffield, Berkshire, Massachusetts 01257-9672; United States; 42°6′56.88″N 73°24′50.04″W

Information
- School type: Co-ed, Private, Boarding and Day school
- Motto: Pro Vita Non Pro Schola Discimus ("Learning — Not just for School, but for Life.")
- Established: 1907
- Founders: Seaver Burton Buck & Anne Allen Buck
- CEEB code: 221900
- NCES School ID: 00603723
- Head of School: Pieter Mulder
- Faculty: 91
- Grades: 9-PG
- Enrollment: 400 Students; 90% Boarding (2021)
- International students: 35 countries (2021)
- Average class size: 12
- Student to teacher ratio: 4:1
- Classes offered: 144
- Campus size: 400 acres (1.6 km^{2})
- Campus type: Rural
- Colors: Green and Gray
- Song: All Hail to Berkshire
- Athletics conference: New England Prep School Athletic Council, District 4
- Nickname: Bears
- Newspaper: Green & Gray
- Yearbook: The Trail
- Endowment: $195 million (as of 6/30/2023)
- School fees: $19.3 million
- Tuition: $73,200 (boarding); $55,400 (day)
- Revenue: $34.3 million
- Website: berkshireschool.org

Berkshire School is a private, co-educational boarding school located in Sheffield, Massachusetts, USA.

== People ==
About 87% of Berkshire's 430 students are boarders, while 13% are day students. The U.S. students hail from 30 states. The 77 international students (18% of the student body) have primary passports from 39 countries. 23% of the students are considered students of color.

In addition to grades 9–12, Berkshire offers a post-graduate year. The ninth grade class (the 3rd form) has about 100 students. Berkshire reportedly accepts about 20% of its 1500 applicants, admitting about 150 new students each year. The average class size is 12.

71% of the 101 faculty live on campus. 68% have advanced academic degrees. The school maintains a student-to-teacher ratio of 4:1.

Pieter Mulder has been Head of School since 2013. As of 2024, the 34 members of the Board of Trustees were all either parents or alumni of the school.

== Classes ==
Berkshire's academic year is divided into trimesters with a week-long winter session. As of 2023, Berkshire had designated 17 classes as “Advanced Placement." Berkshire has Signature programs—such as Advanced Math/Science Research and Advanced Humanities Research.

== Financials ==
Berkshire's 2023-24 day student tuition was $55,400 with an additional $2,000 in fees. Boarding tuition was $73,200. One quarter of Berkshire's students receive financial assistance, with an average award of $54,000.

In addition to tuition, 2/3 of Berkshire parents also contribute to the annual fund, which typically nets almost $3 million each year. As of 2023, the overall school endowment was $195 million, or $435,000 per student.

== History ==
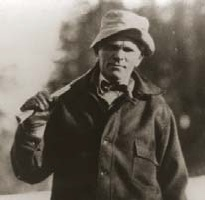
Seaver Buck 1930s

Berkshire School (for boys) was established in 1907 at the foot of Mount Everett, one of the highest mountains in Massachusetts, by Seaver Burton Buck, who led the school until 1943. Buck was reportedly a "Victorian disciplinarian… sometimes subverted by a pixieish manner."

Berkshire became a coeducational school in 1969.

In 1991, Richard Unsworth, whose previous experience included being the headmaster at Northfield Mount Hermon School became headmaster. During Unsworth's headmastership, the school introduced co-curricular programs in Chinese and outdoor education though the school's "reputation for being lax about drugs" remained an issue. Whilst Unsworth incorporated drug-awareness and counseling programs after a series of drug-related incidents he resigned his post. The board of trustees turned to Paul Christopher (1996 - 2002), an ethicist and previous head of philosophy at West Point, New York, as the next headmaster to address the renewed public embarrassment around drugs. Drug and alcohol use "declined dramatically" under Christopher. In June 2002 Christopher resigned as headmaster "amidst sexual harassment allegations."

== Campus facilities ==
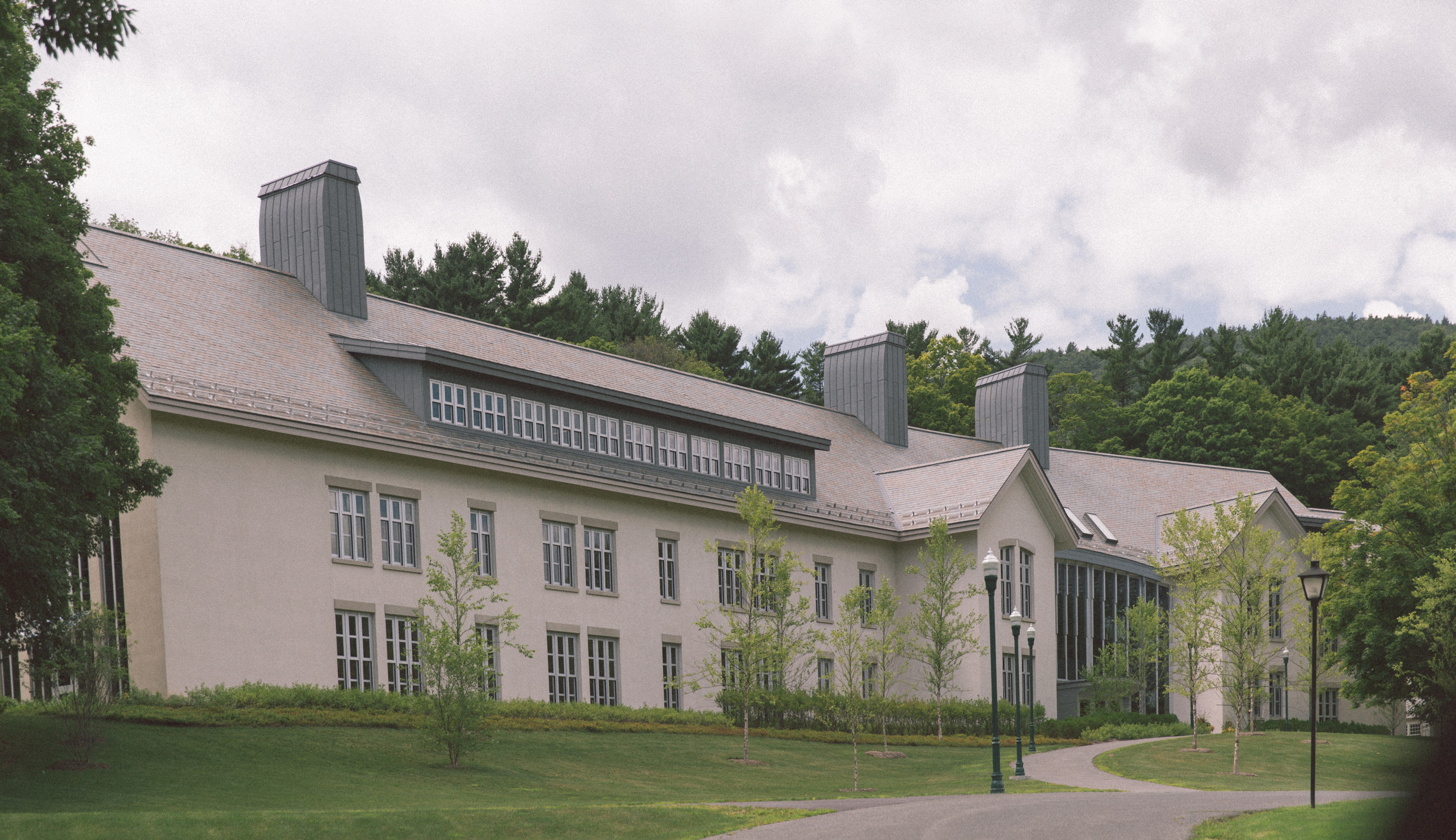
Bellas/Dixon Math and Science Center

- The Allen Theatre (renovated 2011) seats all students and includes a main stage, a video, light, and sound control booth, and a green room for performers and guests.
- The Arthur C. Chase Sugarhouse (2001) was named after a longtime Berkshire teacher and is home to the Berkshire Maple Syrup Corporation.
- The Morgan/Bellas/Dixon Math and Science Center (2012) was named after three longtime Berkshire teachers (Amanda Morgan, Rick Bellas and Tom Dixon). The 48,000-square-foot building is dedicated to math and science classrooms as well as a teaching auditorium and laboratories. The facilities include an electron microscope and other advanced scientific equipment used by the students in the Advanced Math and Science Research Program.
- Berkshire Hall (renovated 2006) is the school's main academic building. It houses academic classrooms and school administrative offices.
- Chevalier Senior Lodge (rebuilt 2018) is a tech-free space that is part of Berkshire's environmental science and sustainability efforts
- The Dixon Observatory (opened 2000) offers the technology for students and teachers to make observe the Solar System and to conduct astro-imaging of faint galaxies and nebulae.
- The Geier Library is a 5400 square foot building that provides books, online resources, and an art exhibition space. On its north side, at ground level, the library also features the Ritt Kellogg Mountain Program (RKMP) the library facilitates this program as a space to meet and plan trips, sign out RKMP gear and bikes, and gather information about the natural areas around the school through wilderness guides, natural history books, and area maps.
- The Kennard Visual Arts Center (2013) features classrooms for ceramics, sculpture, studio art, digital art, digital photography, and digital music. The Kennard Center also houses the Warren Family Gallery that showcases artwork from students, alumni, and the local community. The Calderini Family Faculty Center is home to Berkshire's English, history, and language departments.
- The Music Center (2011) features a classroom for jazz and another for choral and chamber music. The Center contains five practice rooms, a 24-channel recording studio, areas for instrument storage, and a student lounge.
- The Rovensky Student Center includes the Benson Commons, which serves three meals per day and hosts special events. The student center is also home to Shawn's Place, a student lounge with a ping pong table, foosball, and snack bar. The School's Music Center, post office, bookstore and laundry services are also found within the student center.
- The Solar Field is an 8-acre solar field located on the east side of campus. It provides up to 40% of the school's energy needs.

== Interscholastic sports ==
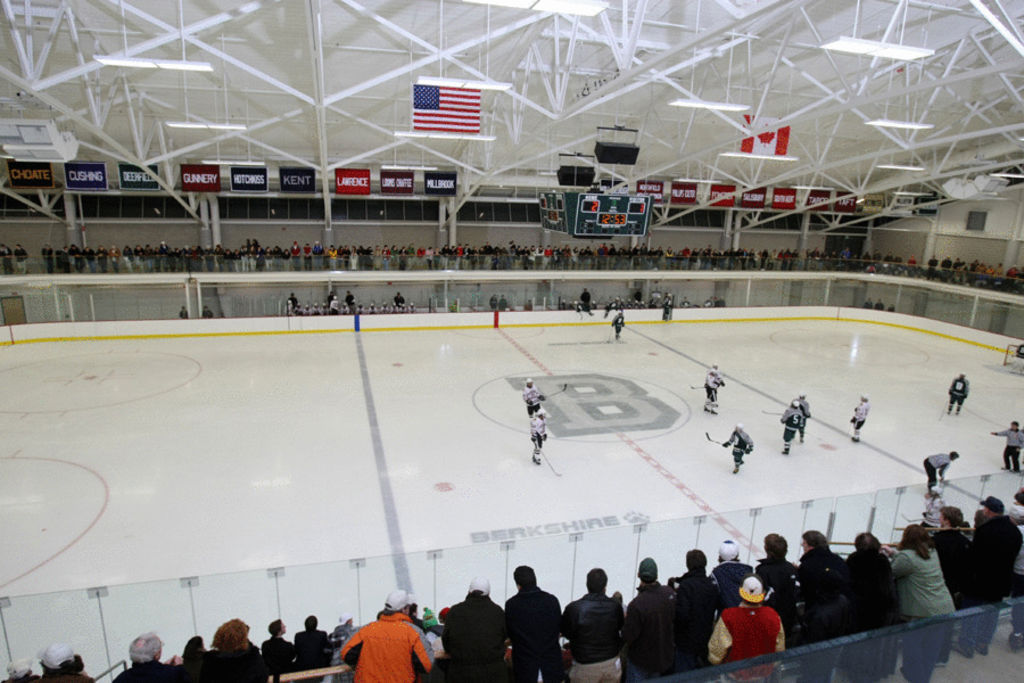
Jackman L. Stewart Athletic Center

Berkshire's approximately 425 students participate in a total of 17 team sports split into three seasons. The teams are divided evenly between girls' teams and boys' teams, except for mountain biking and freestyle skiing, which are coed. In addition to the 32 varsity teams, Berkshire offers 15 junior varsity teams and seven "3rds" teams, which are often for students who are new to that sport.

The sports teams compete in the New England Preparatory School Athletic Council (NEPSAC), generally against similarly sized boarding schools in the northeast and New England. While Berkshire's teams are part of the NEPSAC League, many participate within a smaller subset of the league. For example, the boys' basketball team participates in NEPSAC as well as smaller showcases, such as the NEPSAC Class A Winter Classic, Zero Gravity Scholar Roundball Classic, Zero Gravity Prep Classic, and the Hoop Hall Prep Showcase.

The school has two primary sports buildings. The Stewart Athletic Center was named after Jackman Stewart, a longtime Berkshire athletic director who also, at times, served as the school's dean of students, dean of admissions, and director of development. The Stewart Center features two ice hockey rinks (one Olympic size and one NHL Regulation size), as well as 14 locker rooms, a full athletic training suite, a fitness center, and various conference rooms and offices. One of the ice hockey rinks can be converted into 4 indoor tennis courts. The Athletic Center also hosts campus events such as choral festivals and the school's commencement. The skating facilities are, at times, open to the public.

The Soffer Athletic Center is the school's gymnasium. It features two basketball/volleyball courts, 10 squash courts, a 60-foot climbing wall, a dance studio, as well as exercise areas, locker rooms, and offices. Berkshire has a variety of multi-purpose courts, fields, and pitches, including the Tom Young Field (baseball and softball), Schappert Field (football), Stewart Pitch (soccer) and Beattie Fields (field hockey, lacrosse, soccer).

Between 2021 and 2023, 100 Berkshire graduating seniors signed to play sports at the collegiate level.

== Notable alumni ==
- Oliver L. Austin (1921) - ornithologist
- John Yerxa (1922) - politician
- George Platt Lynes (1926) - photographer
- Lincoln Kirstein (1926) - co-founder of the New York City Ballet
- Stirling Dickinson (1927) - artist
- George Kirstein (1929) - publisher, The Nation
- Harry Gale Nye, Jr. (1929) - industrialist, entrepreneur, sailor
- C. Stanley Ogilvy (1931) - mathematician, sailor, writer
- William Standish Knowles (1934) - Nobel laureate in chemistry
- Wynn Underwood (1943) - judge and politician
- C. S. Reuter (1944) - politician
- Calvin Tomkins (1944) - art critic
- John Hugh MacMillan (1946) - businessman; longtime board member at Cargill
- William Duncan MacMillan (1949) - businessman
- Stephen Malawista (1950) - rheumatologist
- James Harmon (1953) - banker
- C. D. B. Bryan (1954) - writer
- Bruce D. Benson (1956) - former president, University of Colorado, Boulder
- Williamson Murray (1959) - historian
- Peter Kellogg (1960) - businessman
- William Matthews (1960) - poet and essayist
- Chester Currier (1962) - writer
- Carolyn Crimi (1977) - novelist
- E.V. Day (1985) - artist
- Jeff McLaughlin (1985) - rower
- J. P. Davis (1989) - screenwriter and actor
- Conal Groom (1991) - rower
- Ryan Lizza (1992) - journalist
- Kristin Baker (1993) - painter
- Christopher Kostow (1994) - chef
- Budi Djiwandono (2000) - politician
- Kacey Bellamy (2005) - hockey player
- Matt Sewell (2009) - football player
- Joseph Lin (2011) - basketball player
- Kendall Coyne Schofield (2011) - hockey player
- Kevin Rooney (2012) - hockey player
- Rebecca Russo (2012) - hockey player
- Zeiko Lewis (2012) - soccer player
- Jack Harrison (2015) - soccer player
- Justin Donawa (2015) - soccer player
- Kevan Miller - hockey player
- Noah Abrams (2017) - soccer player
- Jacob Shaffelburg (2017) - soccer player
- Adam Raine (2018) - football player
