= C. S. Reuter =

American politician from Florida (1927–2021)

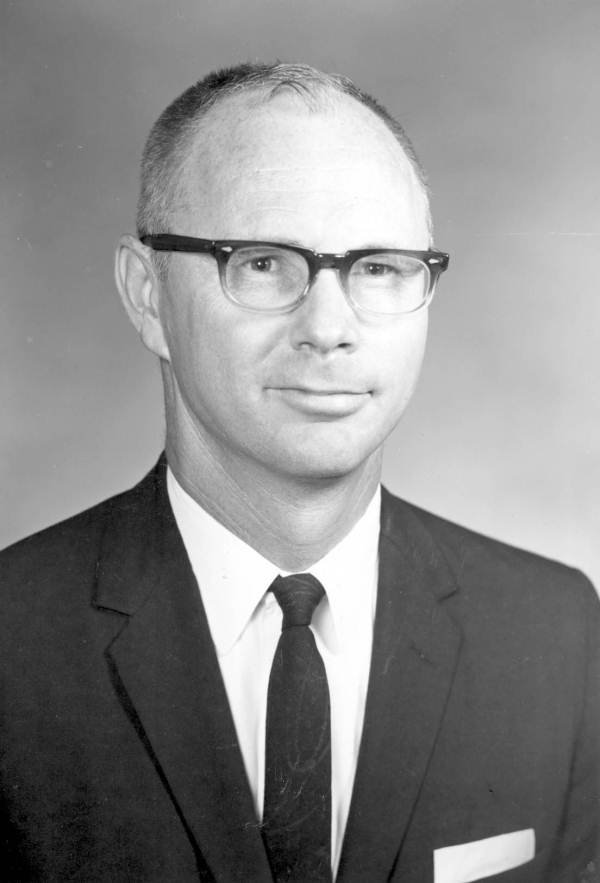
- Reuter circa 1968

Member of the Florida Senate from the 30th district
- In office 1967–1971

Personal details
- Born: November 15, 1927 Scarsdale, New York, US
- Died: July 27, 2021 (aged 93) Lebanon, Tennessee, US
- Party: Democrat
- Education: University of New Hampshire

Clifford Silva Reuter III (November 15, 1927 – July 27, 2021) was an American politician in the state of Florida.

== Early life and education ==
Reuter was born in Scarsdale, New York (Bronxville Hospital) on November 15, 1927, to Clifford Silva Reuter II and Louise Hull Reuter. He attended the Berkshire School in Massachusetts and enlisted in the US Army as a private during the second world war. In 1951, he earned a BS in Business Administration & Electrical Engineering from the University of New Hampshire.

He moved to Florida in 1958.

== Career ==
Reuter was elected to the state senate for the 30th district (comprising Space Coast and Treasure Coast) in 1966 and served until 1971. While he served as a Republican Florida Senator, he later became a member of the Democratic party. During his senate tenure, he worked towards authorizing the creation of Disney World, the 528 Beeline Causeway, and Florida's Aquaculture Farming Industry.
