= Chester Currier =

American journalist

Chester "Chet" Currier (1945–2007) was a newspaper and magazine columnist and nonfiction book author. He worked for Bloomberg News and the Associated Press, providing daily and weekly columns covering Wall Street, markets and financial matters.

Currier was also noted as a major contributor of crossword puzzles, having published over 1000 large-format puzzles through the Associated Press syndicate.

== Biography ==
Currier was born in New York City on 26 March 1945. He attended elementary school in Greenwich, Connecticut, and high school at Berkshire School, a co-educational boarding school in Sheffield, Massachusetts. He was an English major at Amherst College, graduating in 1966 with a bachelor's degree in English. He then served as a lieutenant in the United States Navy (1967–70).

Currier married his wife Carol in 1970. They had one daughter Dana (1980) and one son Craig (1982).

== Career ==
After discharge from the military, Currier's first employment was with a trade journal, Home Furnishings Daily. From there he moved to The Associated Press, first based in Kansas City, Missouri (1970), then in New York (1972). In 1974 he was assigned to provide full-time financial coverage (i.e. Wall Street reporter).

His first financial column for AP was titled Ticker Talk, and provided an irreverent but financially sound analysis of both daily financial events and long-term trends. He added a second column, On the Money in 1979.

In 1999 Currier moved from AP to Bloomberg, providing a twice-a-week column discussing financial news and trends, and providing financial investing advice.

== Later life ==
In 2005 Currier and his wife, Carol, moved from New York to Manhattan Beach, California, where he lived until his death. He died in a local hospice due to complications of prostate cancer on 29 July 2007. He had a son, Craig, and a daughter, Dana.

== Bibliography ==
- Careers in the '80s, Associated Press, 1980.
- The Investor's Encyclopedia: A systematic review of 77 types of investments from annuities to zero coupon bonds, Franklin Watts, Inc., 1985.
- The Investors Annual, Franklin Watts Inc., 1986.
- The Investor's Encyclopedia, Franklin Watts Inc., 1987.
- The 15-Minute Investor: prosperity and peace of mind for the price of a newspaper, in cooperation with the Associated Press, Berkley ed, 1987.
- No cost/low cost investing, co-authored with David Smyth, Franklin Watts Inv., 1987.
- Careers in the '90s, Associated Press, 1989.
- The Associated Press Book of the World's Richest People, Arch Cape Press, 1991.
- Scards of Crosswords: 300 challenging Sunday-sized puzzles from the Associated Press, co-authored with the Associated Press, Gramercy Book, 2005.
