= Martin Clark (author) =

American author and judge (born 1959)

Martin Fillmore Clark, Jr. (born June 23, 1959) is an American author and retired Virginia circuit court judge.

== Biography ==
Clark's first book, The Many Aspects of Mobile Home Living, was published by Alfred A. Knopf in 2000 and was a New York Times Notable Book for 2000, a Book-of-the-Month Club selection and a finalist for The Stephen Crane First Fiction Award.

His second novel, Plain Heathen Mischief, was released in 2004 and was also published by Knopf.

Clark's third novel, The Legal Limit, released in April 2008, again by Knopf, was a Washington Post Best Book of the Year for 2008, and, in October, 2009, was announced as the winner of the Library of Virginia's People's Choice Award for fiction.

The Jezebel Remedy was published in June 2015 and appeared on several bestseller lists, rising to number three on Barnes and Noble's Top 100 Books. In reviewing The Jezebel Remedy, Entertainment Weekly stated that "Clark is, hands down, our finest legal-thriller writer." Additionally, The Jezebel Remedy was chosen as a Boston Globe Best Book for 2015, became a number one bestseller in Amazon's Fiction and Literature category and earned Clark a second Library of Virginia People's Choice Award for fiction. Parkway Brewing Company named a beer The Remedy in honor of the novel.

The Substitution Order was released on July 9, 2019. The novel was once again a bestseller for Clark, landing on several lists, including those compiled by SIBA, Barnes and Noble, and Amazon, where it became his first number one national bestseller. The New York Times called The Substitution Order "a great legal thriller" and selected it as an Editors' Choice, and both SIBA and The Washington Post named it a Best Summer Book. In its review, The Washington Times confirmed that Clark is "often acclaimed as the country's best writer of legal thrillers." Clark won his third Library of Virginia People's Choice Award for fiction on October 17, 2020.

The Plinko Bounce was published in September of 2023 and became another bestseller for Clark. The New York Times lauded the book as "terrific" and selected it as both an Editors' Choice and 2023 Best Thriller. The book's launch event at the Patrick County Public Library continued Clark's charitable contributions to his community, raising $16,052 in scholarship monies which were given to a local high school graduate attending Hollins University. The book won Clark a fourth Library of Virginia People's Choice Award for fiction.

Clark became a juvenile and domestic relations district court judge in 1992 and was appointed to the circuit court bench for the Virginia counties of Patrick and Henry in May 1995. On April 27, 2016, he was presented with the Patrick County Outstanding Community Service Award. In January 2018, the Virginia State Bar awarded him the Harry L. Carrico Professionalism Award. He retired as a judge on May 1, 2019.

Clark attended Woodberry Forest School. He graduated from Davidson College in 1981 and the University of Virginia School of Law in 1984. He lives in Stuart, Virginia.
