= WHEO =

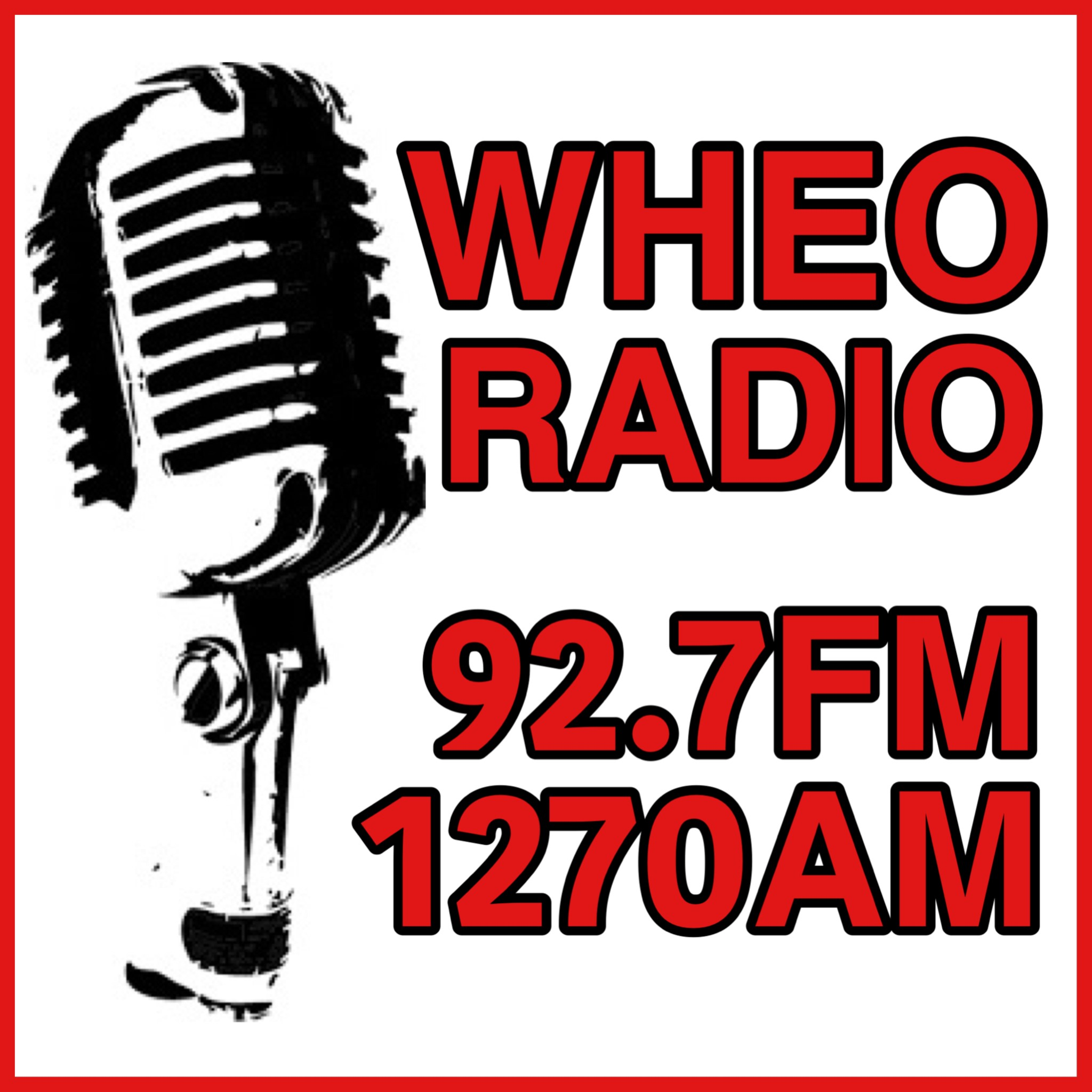
- Stuart, Virginia; United States
- Broadcast area: Stuart, Virginia; Patrick County, Virginia
- Frequency: 1270 kHz
- Branding: WHEO Radio pronounced as "Whee-O Radio"

Programming
- Format: Classic hits Oldies
- Affiliations: Compass Media Networks; Premiere Networks; Townhall Radio News; United Stations Radio Networks; Virginia News Network

Ownership
- Owner: Patrick Community Media, Inc.

History
- First air date: October 12, 1959

Technical information
- Licensing authority: FCC
- Facility ID: 46335
- Class: D
- Power: 5,000 watts day
- Transmitter coordinates: 36°37′25.0″N 80°15′50.0″W
- Translator: 92.7 W224DV (Stuart)

Links
- Public license information: Public file; LMS
- Webcast: Listen Live
- Website: wheoradio.com

WHEO (1270 AM) is a classic hits and oldies formatted broadcast radio station licensed to Stuart, Virginia, serving Stuart and Patrick County, Virginia. WHEO is owned and operated by Patrick Community Media, Inc.

WHEO runs 24/7 on 92.7FM, the AM transmitter (1270) goes silent after dark.

The station is an affiliate of the syndicated Pink Floyd program "Floydian Slip.", BIG JIM'S BIG JAMZ, Dead Til Midnight, MG Kelly programs (Classic Hit List, Live From The 60s, & American Hit List).

== Signing off and back on ==
WHEO fell Silent on August 31, 2014 due to low advertising revenue. On September 1, 2015, less than one day before the station's license expired, WHEO returned to the air. WHEO returned to the air with the help of financial support from "angel lenders in community".

== Translator ==
In addition to the main station, WHEO is relayed by an FM translator to widen its broadcast area.

Broadcast translator for WHEO
Call sign	Frequency	City of license	FID	ERP (W)	HAAT	Class	FCC info
W224DV	92.7 FM	Stuart, Virginia	201341	250	44 m (144 ft)	D	LMS
