= Adam Raine (gridiron football) =

British-American football player (born 1999)

Profile
- Position: Defensive lineman

Personal information
- Born: 26 February 1999 (age 27); Basingstoke, England
- Listed height: 6 ft 4 in (1.93 m)
- Listed weight: 306 lb (139 kg)

Career information
- High school: Berkshire School (Sheffield, Massachusetts, U.S.)
- College: Yale (2018–2022)
- NFL draft: 2023: undrafted

Career history
- Edmonton Elks (2023)
- Stats at CFL.ca

Adam Raine (born 26 February 1999) is a British-born gridiron football defensive lineman. He played college football at Yale. He has been a member of the Edmonton Elks of the Canadian Football League (CFL).

== Early life ==
Raine was born in Basingstoke, England. He began playing American football at the age of 16 with the Farnham Knights, a British American football club. Seeking to further his football career, he moved to the United States and attended the Berkshire School in Sheffield, Massachusetts, for a postgraduate year. At Berkshire, he played both offensive and defensive line positions and was named the New England Preparatory School Athletic Council (NEPSAC) Class B Lineman of the Year. He also earned All-NEPSAC Class B First Team honors and helped lead the team to a NEPSAC championship. He was a two-star rated recruit and would commit to play college football at Yale University over offers from Columbia, Dartmouth, Holy Cross and Maine.

== College career ==
During Raine's true freshman season in 2018, he served as a backup defensive tackle and played in six games and recorded two tackles.

During the 2019 season, he served as a rotational defensive tackle and played in six games and tallied only one tackle.

Raine's 2020 season was canceled due to the COVID-19 pandemic.

During the 2021 season, he appeared in all 10 games, finishing the season with being ranked seventh on the team with 41 tackles. He also made four tackles for a loss and two and a half sacks.

During the 2022 season, he appeared in all 10 games, finishing the season with 27 tackles, 4.5 tackles for a loss, 2.5 sacks, three pass breakups and a blocked kick. He was also named an honorable mention for an All-Ivy selection, along with being a recipient of the team's Frederic Woodrow "Woody" Knapp Memorial Trophy and the Jordan Olivar Award.

== Professional career ==
Pre-draft measurables
Height	Weight	Arm length	Hand span	40-yard dash	10-yard split	20-yard split	20-yard shuttle	Three-cone drill	Vertical jump	Broad jump	Bench press
6 ft 4 in (1.93 m)	296 lb (134 kg)	32 3/8 in (0.82 m)	9 7/8 in (0.25 m)	5.32 s	1.87 s	3.10 s	4.64 s	7.28 s	27 in (0.69 m)	8 ft 3 in (2.51 m)	24 reps
All values from Pro Day

On May 2, 2023, Raine received a rookie minicamp invite by the Washington Commanders, but would not end up getting signed.

On May 16, 2023, Raine signed to play for the Edmonton Elks of the Canadian Football League (CFL).
