= Goblintown Mill =

- U.S. National Register of Historic Places
- Virginia Landmarks Register
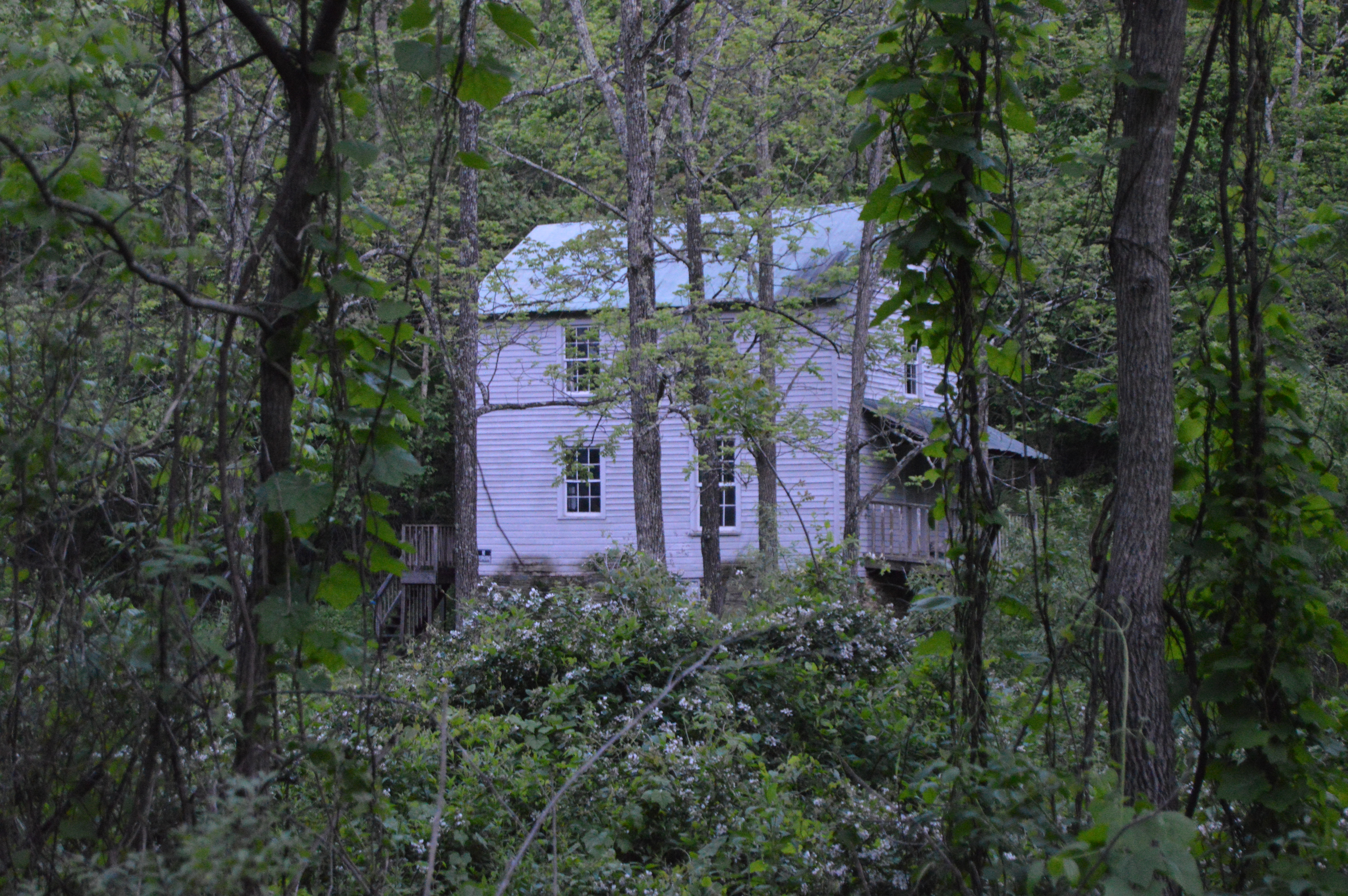
- Northern side

- Location within Virginia Location within the United States
- Location: 888 Iron Bridge Rd., near Stuart, Virginia
- Coordinates: 36°47′38″N 80°9′36″W
- Area: 8 acres (3.2 ha)
- Built: c. 1850, c. 1902
- Built by: Lewis Turner
- Architectural style: 19th Century Rural
- NRHP reference No.: 04001271
- VLR No.: 070-5042

Significant dates
- Added to NRHP: November 26, 2004
- Designated VLR: September 8, 2004

Goblintown Mill, also known as Turner's Mill, Wood's Mill, Walker's Mill, and Martin's Mill, is a historic grist mill complex located near Stuart, Patrick County, Virginia. The mill dates to the 1850s, and is a two-story, timber-frame building on a dry stone foundation. The mill retains its original mill race and milling machinery. Associated with the mill is a 1 1/2-story, frame "storehouse" that housed a general store and dwelling. It was built about 1902.

It was listed on the National Register of Historic Places in 2004.
