= A. G. Chapman =

Australian builder (1834–1914)

Alfred George Chapman (1834 – 30 January 1914), invariably referred to as A. G. Chapman, was a builder in the early days of Adelaide, South Australia.

== History ==
Chapman was born in Enfield, London. He married and emigrated to South Australia, arriving in Adelaide around 1854 and started working as a carpenter for Beeby & Dunstan, millers, of Grenfell Street, and had a residence in the city.

He was involved in the construction of Charles Todd's telegraph line to Port Adelaide in 1856, the MacDonnell Bridge over the Torrens to Paradise (opened 1857), and the Glenelg jetty (opened 25 April 1859). He also worked for the Railways.

He established himself as a builder and contractor, with an office in Roberts Street, later in Hutt Street. He worked on a wide range of prestigious projects, frequently for architect Daniel Garlick:

- 1869 servants' quarters at Government House
- 1870 "superior residence" for Frank Rymill on East Terrace
- 1870 Northmore's drapery, on part of the DaCosta bequest to St Peter's College
- 1870 Pulteney Street School additional building
- 1871 Four shops on Gawler place for Alexander Dowie; houses on Wakefield Street for T. English and Thomas Gattey Brown
- 1872 Northmore's shop remodelled and doubled in size
- 1872 Brown & Woods' store on Waymouth Street
- 1872 Several two-storey houses for T. English in Wakefield Street, one for C. Glover on Gilles Street, two for C. Wadey in Franklin Street, one for S. Whitmore on South Terrace, ...
- 1873 J. Calder's biscuit factory on Twin Street,
- 1874 rebuilt the guardhouse to Government House and gateway.
- 1875 Parliament House extensions
- 1875 Norwood and Kensington Institute
- 1876 further expansion of Northmore & Deans emporium, Rundle Street, also part of Wills & Co.'s store on Rundle Street.
- 1877 an Oyster saloon for G. Moseley and the Crown and Sceptre Hotel for A. Hubble, both on King William Street, also a store and factory on Waymouth Street for Bickford & Sons
- 1877 Morialta Chambers in Victoria Square and Waymouth Chambers on Waymouth Street
- 1878 Torrens Chambers, adjacent Morialta Chambers on Victoria Square.
- 1878 Academy of Music, Rundle Street
- 1878 Charles Birks emporium, Rundle Street

Each year he held a Christmas get-together of his workers, usually 20 or thirty men, for lunch with their families. Around 1880 he quit the building business.

He invested heavily in land during the boom with some success at first, later lost a great deal, and quit business.

He became a partner in W. F. Gray and Co. (with Frederik William Gray and Henry Snelling), plumbers and sheetmetal workers at the corner of Grenfell and Hyde streets, which he took over in 1891, retaining the name. The company began manufacturing "Snelling & Chapman's Little Gem Spray Pump". In 1908 Snelling sued Chapman for unpaid royalties on the device. By 1904 Chapman had taken his son Allan Chapman into partnership.

His son enlisted with the 1st AIF on 5 October 1915, giving occupation as "Master Plumber", served with the 43rd Battalion, gunshot wound January 1917 rendered him paraplegic, died at 7 AGH, Keswick, South Australia on 6 September 1917. Their son Private Alfred George Chapman (born 1899) died of wounds 18 April 1918.

== Other interests ==
Chapman was a keen cricketer and footballer, and was inaugural president of the South Adelaide Cricket Club in 1875 and of the South Adelaide Football Club in 1876.

He was admitted to the South Australian Chamber of Manufactures in 1877.

== Personal ==
Chapman was married to Sarah Helen Chapman (c. 1832 – 26 January 1883). Their home was on Hutt Street from 1867 or earlier, then "Enfield House", Parkside, from 1878 or earlier, and by 1904 was at Eighth Street, St Peters. They had one son and eight daughters:

- Maria Mary Chapman (1855– ) married Frederic William Gray on 9 November 1875 (Cowell in 1914)
- Mary Ann Chapman (1857– ) married Samuel James Whitmore on 13 November 1878 (Adelaide)
- Margaret Jane Chapman (1859– ) married George Stephens of Castlemaine, Victoria on 20 August 1879
- Agnes Hume Chapman (1861– ) married Ernest Govett of Paddington, London, on 13 December 1887 (London)
- Jessie Louisa Chapman (1863 – ) married Robert McCosh Pratt on 11 May 1892 (Grange)
- Eva Helen Chapman (1967– ) (Prospect).
- Allan Hume Chapman (1871–1917) married Emily Gogan on 28 October 1892.
- Emily Maud "Emmie" Chapman (1873– ) married Carl Pfeffer (not Pfeiffer) of Heidelberg, Germany, on 28 January 1904 at Bayswater, London (Buenos Ayres)
- Katie Edith (Katy Edyth?) Chapman (1875– ) married Walter Knight Dixon on 26 December 1999 (Perth)
