= Patrick County High School =

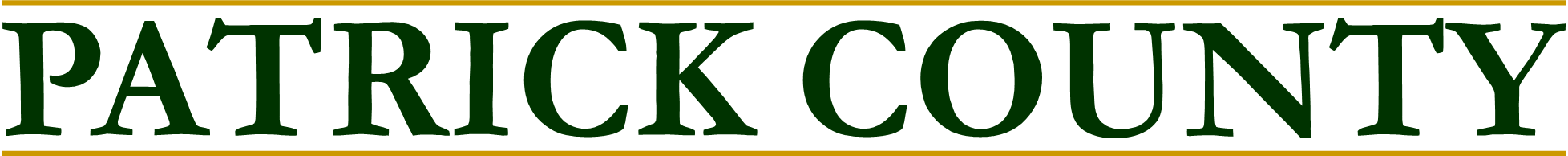

Location
- 215 Cougar Lane; Stuart, Virginia 24171; United States; 36.6234°N 80.2705°W

Information
- Type: Public high school
- Motto: Believe. Achieve. Succeed
- Established: 1970
- Locale: Rural, Distant
- School district: Patrick County Public Schools
- NCES District ID: 5102880
- Superintendent: Jason Wood
- NCES School ID: 510288001188
- Principal: Hope Perry
- Teaching staff: 61.10 (on an FTE basis)
- Grades: 8-12
- Enrollment: 795 (2024–25)
- Student to teacher ratio: 13.01
- Campus type: Rural
- Colors: Green and Gold
- Athletics: Virginia High School League
- Sports: 16 teams
- Mascot: Cougar
- Nickname: Patrick County Cougars
- Affiliations: Virginia High School League AA Region IV, AA Piedmont District
- Website: pch.patrick.k12.va.us

Patrick County High School is a comprehensive public high school in Stuart, Virginia, USA. The school currently enrolls over 1,000 students in grades 8–12. It is the only public high school operated by the Patrick County Public Schools. The school is accredited by the Southern Association of Colleges and Schools along with the Virginia Department of Education.

Students who graduate from Stuart Elementary, Hardin Reynolds Memorial, Woolwine Elementary, Blue Ridge Elementary, and Meadows of Dan Elementary matriculate into Patrick County High School.

Opening in 1970 after a county-wide consolidation of schools, Patrick County High School is located approximately one mile south of the town of Stuart in Patrick County, Virginia.

== Principals of Patrick County High School ==
- James K. Hiatt (1970–1989)
- Bill I. Dillon (1989–1995)
- Glenn W. Blackburn (1995–1997)
- Gary Safritt (1998)
- E.G. Bradshaw, Jr. (1999–2011)
- Moriah Dollarhite (2011–2013)
- Trey Cox (2013–2021)
- Hope Perry (2021–Present)

In 2009, Bradshaw was named the Outstanding High School Principal of Virginia by the Virginia Association of Secondary School Principals (VASSP)

== History ==
Patrick County High School represents the first and only consolidated school of secondary education in Patrick County. Conceived in the mid-1960s, the school opened its doors to students for the first time in August 1970. With James K. Hiatt as principal, the first senior class graduated in early June of the following year.

The school has undergone a number of structural upgrades through the years. There is a plan in effect to restructure the entire front side of the school, increasing the number of classrooms, building a new main office, and providing new areas for several of the fine arts programs. This will be the largest improvement the school has seen since it was first built almost 40 years ago.

== Distinguished Patrick Countian and Distinguished Service Award ==
Beginning in 1975, the Student Council Association (SCA) began awarding the Distinguished Patrick Countian Award to a member of the community, and has done so every year since. In 1993, the SCA started giving a second award, the Outstanding Community Service Award.

The committee to determine these recipients is chaired by the treasurer of the SCA for the academic year. The committee is made up of the executive council of the SCA. In 2003, the committee announced that the Outstanding Community Service Award would henceforth be titled the Distinguished Service Award.

A school-wide ceremony is held in the spring of each year to recognize the recipients and is often attended by past recipients and other members of the community. The Distinguished Patrick Countian Award is considered the highest honor a citizen of Patrick County can receive.

Past recipients have included Judge John Dillard Hooker, Nannie Ruth Cooper Terry, Algie Spencer, Annie Hylton, Winifred Roberson, Dr. Stewart Roberson, Bill Pons, Ella Sue Joyce, Joseph H. Vipperman Jr., and Ronald D. Haley. Haley is the only recipient to have won both the Distinguished Patrick Countian Award (2007) and the Distinguished Service Award (1993).

Recipients of the Distinguished Service Award include Clyde Crissman, D. Philip Plaster, Dr. Richard Cole, and Thomas Rakes.

== Athletics ==
Known as the Cougars, Patrick County High School boasts 16 varsity sports teams. Men's sports include baseball, basketball, cross country, football, golf, soccer, tennis, track and field, and wrestling. Women's sports include basketball, cheerleading, cross country, soccer, softball, track and field, and volleyball. With their colors of green and gold, the Cougars compete in the AA Piedmont District of AA Region IV of the Virginia High School League (VHSL). District opponents include the Bassett High School Bengals, Magna Vista High School Warriors, Martinsville High School Bulldogs, and Tunstall High School Trojans. Other local rivals include neighboring Floyd County High School Buffaloes and Carroll County High School Cavaliers.

The Cougars have found success in every sport at some point. Most recently, football, women's basketball, men's tennis, softball, women's cross country and wrestling have produced both individual and team championships within the last five years.

Patrick County Varsity Football

The Cougar varsity football team broke their 40-game losing streak by defeating the Chatham HS Cavaliers in their season opener and the Carroll County HS Cavaliers on their Senior Night.

Athletic Facilities

The Patrick County Cougars are known for having excellent facilities and continue to improve on them year after year with strong support from the community. John D. Hooker Field, the home to Patrick County's football and soccer teams received new stadium seating on both sidelines in the last five years. With new seating on the visitor sidelines also came the demolition of the old press box. A small structure was constructed on the sideline that houses more restrooms and some storage. The school is scheduled to install a new scoreboard in the near future as well.

The school's gymnasium received new seating in 1999. An addition was made in the late 1990s as well. A practice gym was built adjacent to the game gymnasium, and an improved weight room and wrestling room was added as well. Before the 2009-2010 academic year began, the gymnasium underwent minor upgrades which included new athletic flooring, wall mats, and paint scheme for the walls. Upgrades to coaches' offices and locker rooms are planned as a phase project which was scheduled to be completed in 2011. The baseball field underwent a major overhaul in 2004 and 2005, just as the softball facilities did before that. The track and field facilities will leave John D. Hooker Field in 2009 and be moved to the practice field behind the school. The tennis courts were refurbished in 2004.

== Patrick County High School Athletic Hall of Fame ==
2015 Hall of Fame Class

Tim Goad, Brad Clontz, Christian Batchelor, Gerald Culler, Sonny Swails, Evalene Hatcher-Reed, Sabrina Reynolds-Pinkard, Bill Hanner, Andy Stanley, Cindy Terry, and Winfred Reid

== The Pride of Patrick County ==
Patrick County has an award-winning marching band, known as the "Pride of Patrick County." The band was first established by long standing band director and athletic director, Bill Pons. Pons helped Patrick County become known as one of the best high school bands in the state, a reputation which continues today as the program is still highly regarded. The band season is built around several traveling competitions and one home competition, known as the Celebration of Pride. 2015 will mark the 29th consecutive year of the event, making it one of the longest held competitions in Virginia.

Past Directors Include: Bill Pons: 1970-1994, Kevin Lewis: 1995-1997, Larry Coleman: 1998-2003, Glen Gray: 2004-2005, Joshua Follweiler: 2006, Lynn Stegall: 2007-2012, Frances Stover: 2013-2015, Joseph Whitt: 2015-Current

The Pride of Patrick County is now entering the 45th year as a competitive marching band and is composed of approximately 80-100 students each year.

School Songs

Patrick County's fight song is to the tune of "Across the Field," made famous by the Ohio State University Buckeyes. The song is played by the marching band at athletic contests and at pep-rallies.

The school's alma mater was written in 1993 by Frank Greenwalt, and scored by Mike Milam. The song is titled "Hail Patrick County!"

                 Proud Blue Ridge Mountains, In your realm we thrive. Toward
                             greater wisdom. Ever will we strive.
                   Hail Patrick County, Hail, to the green and gold! Hail to
                        the school we love, Strong and true and bold!
                         We will be true to you As our dreams unfold.
                   Hail to the school we love, Strong, and true, and bold!

== Notable alumni ==
- Tim Goad, defensive tackle in the NFL
- Brad Clontz, relief pitcher in Major League Baseball
- Jon Wood, NASCAR driver for Wood Brothers Racing
- Keven Wood, NASCAR driver for Wood Brothers Racing
- Wren Williams, Delegate for the 47th district in the Virginia House of Delegates
