= Daniel Garlick =

(1818–1902) architect

Daniel Garlick (20 January 1818 – 28 September 1902) was an architect in the early days of South Australia. During his lifetime, his architectural practice names were Garlick & Son and Jackman & Garlick. After his death his name was perpetuated by two rival firms: Garlick & Sibley and then Garlick, Sibley & Wooldridge; and Garlick & Jackman and then Garlick, Jackman & Gooden (until around 1950, when this firm became Jackman, Gooden & Scott).

== History ==
Garlick arrived in Adelaide aged 19 with his father Moses Bendle Garlick (c. 1784 – October 1859) and siblings Deborah, William (aged 15), Thomas (aged 11) aboard Katherine Stewart Forbes from London, first landing at Kingscote, Kangaroo Island in October 1837, just a year after the "First Fleet of South Australia". Soon afterwards Moses Garlick, a plasterer by trade, built on the banks of the Torrens Adelaide's first permanent dwelling; unauthorised, as surveying of the city had not been completed. Similar dwellings nearby were those of William Pritchard and Isaac French.

In 1839 he built North Adelaide's first house, "White Court House". In 1841 Moses Garlick founded a timber and building business in Kermode Street, North Adelaide, and Daniel was practising as an architect by 1853. Daniel worked in the firm known as Moses Garlick & Son from 1841 to 1855, after which he worked on his own for a few years.

Around 1850 Moses Garlick passed the timber business to a Mr Turner, and the family moved from North Adelaide to a 450 acres (180 ha) property in Munno Para East, dubbed "Uley" for their hometown Uley, Gloucestershire (also Colonel Henry Kingscote's birthplace), and later became the township Uleybury. Moses donated an acre of land to the Baptist church and built a chapel. The family grew wheat and grapes and made wine.

Garlick, whose health was not robust, took little part in the farming business. He ran his architecture practice from "Uley", later sharing an office with Smith & Cullen in nearby Gawler. His projects included country houses, shops, churches and chapels in the city and the countryside north of Adelaide. In 1857 he opened his own office in Murray Street, Gawler. Later that year he advertised his services as a moneylender, and entered into a short-lived partnership with George Abbott (c. 1793 – 3 April 1869) (as Garlick & Abbott, later with the Colonial Architect's Department.

He went into partnership in Register Chambers, Adelaide, in December 1868 with William McMinn, as Garlick & McMinn, which was similarly cut short in 1871 when McMinn received a Government appointment.

He supervised his son Arthur while he was serving his articles, then as a partner from June 1884, with the practice then known as Garlick & Son (1882–1891). Over the next fifteen years they changed their focus between Adelaide and Broken Hill several times, depending on the economic climate. In the 1870s Garlick passed much construction work to builders A. G. Chapman.

Some time before 1886 Garlick & Son took on students A. G. Salmon and Herbert Louis Jackman (1867–1936). Jackman was the son of dining room entrepreneur Joseph Jackman and father of architect Herbert Montefiore Jackman (who worked first for English and Soward and later for Garlick and Jackman).

In 1891 a partnership Jackman & Garlick was established to handle the Broken Hill practice. In June 1892 the two partnerships were combined, then dissolved in 1899 when Garlick retired.

Eric McMichael worked with the practice around 1900.

A few weeks before he died in September 1902, Garlick entered into a new partnership with Henry Evan "Harry" Sibley (c.1867–1917), which never was put into practice.

Sibley, by arrangement with Mrs Garlick, continued to trade as "Garlick & Sibley" for several years then Garlick, Sibley & Wooldridge to 1910. The name "Garlick & Jackman", then "Garlick, Jackman & Gooden" (with Lancelot Gooden) perpetuated his name to around 1950 when the firm became Jackman, Gooden & Scott (with Earle Scott).

In 1912 Garlick & Jackman designed a new picture theatre for the Greater Wondergraph Company in Hindley Street, Adelaide city centre, which was later renamed the Civic Theatre in the 1940s, before its demolition and rebuilding.

== Selected works ==
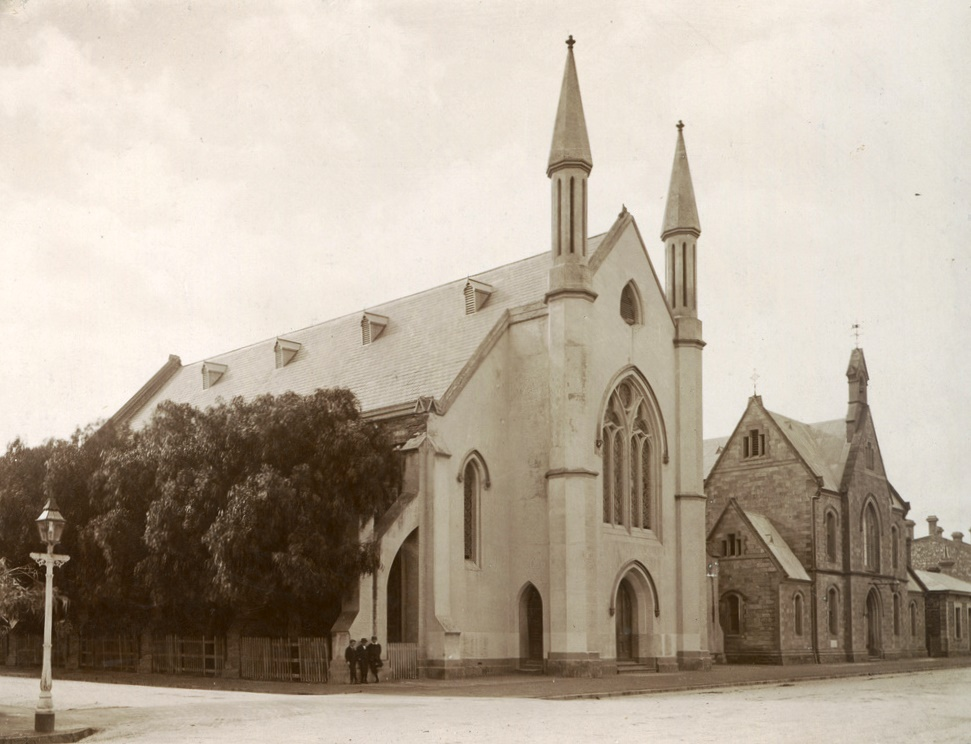
Methodist Church, Archer Street, North Adelaide built 1857. Hall to right was designed by Garlick 1883. Both demolished 1967

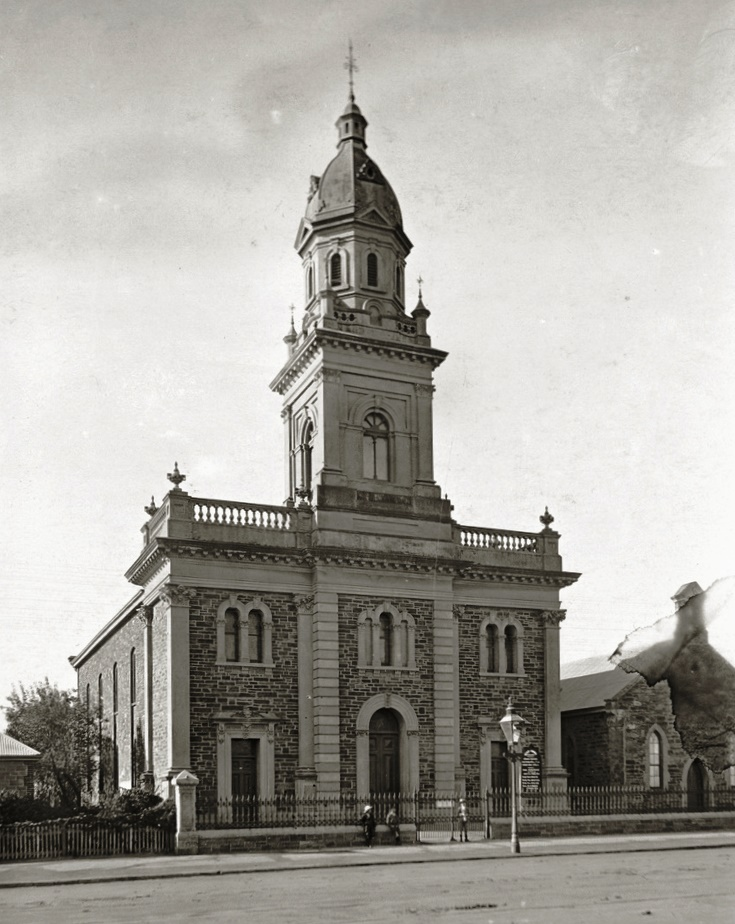
Methodist Church, Norwood. Designed by Garlick and completed 1878. Old church seen at right.

- St. John's (Anglican) Church, Salisbury (1865)
- Wesleyan Methodist Church, at Chapel Street, Magill (1874)
- Norwood Wesleyan Methodist Church at 239 The Parade, Norwood (1874)
- Uniting Church and Hall, 90–92a Jetty Road, Glenelg, (1878), built in 1880
- Wesleyan Church at Aldgate (1883)
- St Cyprians Anglican Church, 70 Melbourne Street, North Adelaide (1882)
- Methodist Church school and lecture hall in Archer Street, North Adelaide (1883)
- Home for Thomas Magarey (1873)
- Home for R. Lathlean, College Park
- Newmarket Hotel, 1 North Terrace, Adelaide SA
- Buck's Head Hotel, 24 North Terrace, for W. H. Gray (1869)
- G. & R. Wills warehouse, 203–207 North Terrace, Adelaide (1878)
- Queens Chambers at 19 Pirie Street, Adelaide (1869)
- St Peter’s College at Hackney; building/s not specified (1878)
- Prince Alfred College, 23 Dequetteville Terrace, Kent Town; several buildings with W. McMinn (1868–1878)

== Other interests ==
Garlick was a founding member of the SA Institute of Architects, and its second president (1892–1900). He served as the Institute's Patron in the last years of his life.

Garlick was chairman of the District Council of Munno Para East from 1855 to 1860.

He represented Robe ward in the Adelaide City Council from 1868 to 1870.

He was a regular worshipper at the (Anglican) Christ Church, North Adelaide.

He was a longtime member of the Adelaide Benevolent and Strangers' Friend Society, and a committee member for many years.

He was a generous supporter of Cottage Homes (Inc.).

The Garlick Prize, for architectural drawing at Prince Alfred College, was named for him.

== Family ==
Moses Bendle Garlick (10 September 1784 – 1 October 1859) married (Heather) Rachel Smith ( –1832)

- Daniel Garlick (20 January 1818 – 28 September 1902) married Lucy Poole, née King, (c. 1830 – 26 July 1871) on 6 August 1861. They lived on Kermode Street, North Adelaide. He married again on 1877, to the widow (Martha) Mary Rebecca Abbott (c. 1830 – 18 January 1912) on 29 September 1877. She died at Glenelg.

- Arthur Dan Bendle Garlick (30 May 1863 – 27 June 1901) married Amelia Haussen in 1890, died in Maryborough, where he had been working as partner of Eaton, Bates & Garlick, architects.
- Allen Treveny Garlick (12 August 1864 – 5 July 1893) died of pneumonia at Marble Bar, Western Australia, where he was a gold miner.

- Deborah Garlick (25 December 1819 – 4 June 1904) married John Pitcher (1818 – 1843)
- William Garlick (1822? 1828? – 11 October 1885) married the widow Martha Smith, née Cox, (c. 1824 – 6 November 1894) on 25 September 1860

- William Moses Garlick (1862 – 1897) married Adelaide Bohlmann (1861 – 1952); living at Kermode Street in 1903

- (William) Julius Garlick (21 October 1891 – ) married Vera Annie Waldie (1892–1977) in 1920

- Thomas Garlick (25 March 1826 – 23 December 1897)
