= Joseph Jackman =

Manager of dining rooms in South Australia

Joseph Jackman (c. 1844 – 10 December 1914) was the founder of Jackman's Rooms which incorporated a restaurant "Jackman's Dining Room", meeting rooms, dance hall and banqueting room at 48–50 King William Street, Adelaide, and several other cafes in Adelaide, South Australia.

== History ==
Joseph was born in Peckham, England, to bootmaker Joseph Jackman, Snr, (21 July 1813 – 9 November 1908) and his first wife Lydia (c.1810 – 30 June family 1861), who with their family emigrated to the colony of South Australia on the Warren Hastings, arriving in October 1855 and opened a bootmaker's shop on Rundle Street.

Joseph moved to Kapunda, where he worked as carpenter and undertaker, also land agent and auctioneer. He married and had several children there, then around 1870 moved to Adelaide, where he opened a cafe in Rundle Street, perhaps at number 117, which was open for meals 8 a.m. to 8 p.m. The business moved in 1871 to much larger premises, which for many years was a major function centre in the city. Situated at 48–50 King William Street, it incorporated a dance hall and banqueting room, as well as serving casual meals from 7 a.m. to 11 p.m. It was renamed Grand Cafe in 1911 or perhaps earlier, and around that time its management was taken over by his sons Jim and Arthur. The business was sold to Balfour's in 1917. "Jackman's Rooms" was the regular meeting-place of various organisations, including Adelaide Chess Club from 1884, Tarawera Bridge Club, Christian Brothers Old Collegians Association and S.A. Institute of Surveyors.

Jackman's served ice cream in several flavours (vanilla, raspberry, strawberry, lemon, and pineapple flavoured) from 1880.

His other businesses in the city were:

- Jackman's Dining Room and Chop-House, 48 Rundle Street, in 1872, which was open for meals 8 a.m. to 9 p.m.
- 117 Rundle Street 1879 in the newly built Kither's Buildings, last advertised 1882.
- Jackman's Cafe (Vienna coffee) 13 Hindley Street from 1902 to at least 1906
- Jackman's Temperance Coffee Palace 211–213 Rundle Street opened in 1885, a coffee palace offering accommodation. It was renamed Jackman's Eastern Coffee Palace in 1886, stopped advertising 1888.

== Family ==
Joseph Jackman (c. 1844 – 10 December 1914) married Fanny Wheaton ( –1935) at Kapunda, later lived Payneham, died at Wattle Street Malvern. Their children included:

- Herbert Louis Jackman (1867–1936) was architect with Garlick & Jackman, then took over the business with his brother Sydney. They designed many notable buildings including Adelaide railway station, Wondergraph cinema, Hindley Street (later Civic Theatre), Charles Moore's building, James Marshall building (later Myer's), The Register building, Kither's Building (first reinforced concrete building in Australia) with Sir John Monash. He was an accomplished modeller in clay; his bust of senior partner Daniel Garlick (died 1902), subsequently cast in bronze, was highly praised.
- Arthur Joseph Jackman (1869–1959) married Adela Mary Williams ( –1960) in 1900. He was co-manager of the Grand Cafe with brother Jim, and later licensee of the Pier Hotel, Glenelg, retiring in 1924. His son Frank Downer Jackman became Commissioner of Highways.
- James Wheaton "Jim" Jackman ( –1959) was player with Norwood Football Club manager, Grand Cafe.
- Frank Elliott Jackman (1873– ) electrician in WA
- Clement Jackman (1876– ) married Lilian May Solomon ( – ) in 1901 with GPO
- Sydney Wheaton Jackman (1878–1844) married Margaret Beatrice ?? ( – ). He was architect with brother Herbert, inaugural captain of Glenelg Golf Club.
- Royston Eric "Roy" Jackman (1880– ) married Mary Cramp ( –1952) in 1904. He was an engineer with Ritchie & Jackman, later founded Malleable Iron Company of South Australia.
- (Leslie) Fred Jackman (1883– ) married Silver May Hunt ( –1968) in 1913. Served in the 11th Field Company Engineers, AIF, 1916. Occupation prior to joining up listed as Accountant.
- Olive Margretta "Reta" Jackman (1886–1968)

== See also ==
- White's Rooms
- Albert Hall, Adelaide
