= Jackman Stewart =

Jackman L. Stewart (1930–2000) was a teacher, coach, and school administrator. Stewart worked at the Berkshire School in Sheffield, Massachusetts, for 34 years (1956-1990). He served as the school's athletic director for 20 years (1963-1980; 1983-1986). Stewart's administrative roles at the school also included dean of students, dean of admissions, and director of development. The Berkshire School's hockey facility and its soccer award bear his name. The Jackman L. Stewart Soccer Award recognizes a "male and female soccer player who best exemplifies the spirit of Berkshire School soccer."

== Early life and education ==
Stewart was born on February 5, 1930, to Maude L. Stewart and Ralph L. Stewart. He graduated from the Morristown School (now Morristown-Beard School) in Morristown, New Jersey. Stewart then completed his bachelor's degree at Springfield College in Springfield, Massachusetts, in 1954. During his studies at Springfield College, Stewart played as a goaltender for the men's ice hockey team, and he played on the men's soccer team. Stewart also served on the staff of the school's yearbook and radio station. After graduating, he served in the U.S. Air Force during the Korean War. Stewart then began his career as a teacher. After teaching history at Roeliff Jansen Central High School in Hillsdale, New York, he joined the faculty of the Berkshire School in 1956. Stewart began working as a coach for soccer and junior varsity boys' hockey.

== Coaching career ==
Stewart notched 170 wins while serving as the boys' hockey coach at the Berkshire School for 21 years. During his third year at the school, he guided Berkshire School to its first Tri-State Hockey League Championship in 1958. Stewart also coached the boys' soccer team at Berkshire School for 19 years and the girls' soccer team at the school for six years. In 1969, he led the boys' soccer team at the Berkshire School to an undefeated season and tournament championship for the Western New England Preparatory School Soccer Association (WNEPSSA).

Stewart served on the Executive Committee of WNEPSSA and then as the association's president During his tenure in the WNEPSSA leadership, he helped establish exchange programs between the U.S. and Great Britain. In 1979, the London Football Coaches' Association awarded Stewart their scroll "in recognition of his services to soccer". WNEPSSA named its Division A championship trophy the Stewart Cup in 1989 to recognize his contributions to high school athletics in New England.

Stewart also served as president of the New England Preparatory School Athletic Council from 1972 to 1974. In 1993, the Council awarded Stewart their Distinguished Service Award. The award recognizes an individual who has "contributed significantly to New England Independent School Athletics and Physical Education through enthusiasm, dedication, leadership, and vision."

== Jackman L. Stewart Athletic Center ==
In 2009, Berkshire School opened its Jackman L. Stewart Athletic Center, a 117,000 square foot facility that cost $30 million to construct. Five hundred members of the Berkshire School community attended the dedication ceremony for the new facility held in January of that year. The Stewart Center replaced the Rovensky Field House, which had served as the hockey facility at Berkshire School since 1960. Built to maximize energy efficiency, the Stewart Center uses geoexchange cooling systems and daylight harvesting technology for lighting.

The Stewart Center has two ice hockey rinks: an Olympic-sized rink and an NHL-sized rink); The larger rink seats 600 spectators, and the smaller rink seats 150 spectators. The center also includes a community fitness center, an athletic training suite, conference rooms, and athletic department offices. Upon removal of the boards, the Stewart Center's smaller rink can transform into a theatre with 1,500 seats to facilitate hosting performances and all-school events. During the school year, the center hosts indoor tennis and campus events, including Prize Night and commencement. During the summer, the Stewart Center hosts performances by the Berkshire Choral Festival.

The need for two hockey rinks at the Stewart Center reflected the importance of ice hockey to student life at Berkshire School. As of 2009, more than a third of its students play the game of ice hockey. The school has three boys' hockey teams (varsity, junior varsity, and third team), and two girls' hockey teams (varsity and junior varsity). As of 2009, the hockey team at Mount Everett Regional High School and the Berkshire Rattlers youth hockey team also play their home games at the center.
