= Stuart, Virginia =

- Town
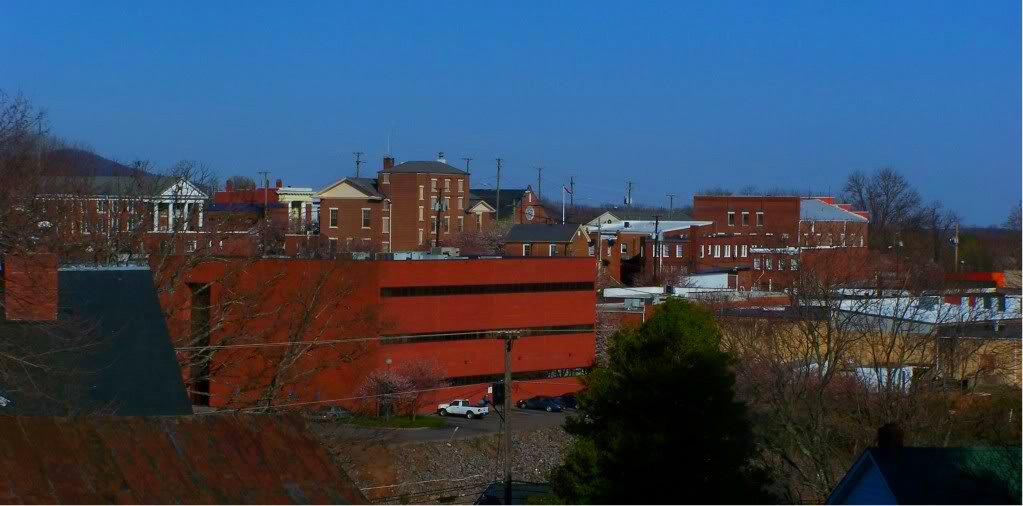
- Historic Patrick County Courthouse

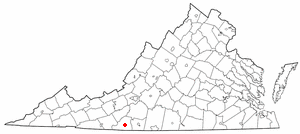
- Location of Stuart, Virginia
- Coordinates: 36°38′25″N 80°16′26″W
- Country: United States
- State: Virginia
- County: Patrick
- Founded: 1792

Government
  - Type: Mayor-Council
  - Mayor: Ray Weiland

Area
  - Total: 3.04 sq mi (7.87 km^{2})
  - Land: 3.04 sq mi (7.87 km^{2})
  - Water: 0 sq mi (0.00 km^{2})
- Elevation: 1,345 ft (410 m)

Population (2020)
  - Total: 1,431
  - Estimate (2019): 1,271
  - Density: 418.4/sq mi (161.53/km^{2})
- Time zone: UTC−5 (Eastern (EST))
  - Summer (DST): UTC−4 (EDT)
- ZIP code: 24171
- Area code: 276
- FIPS code: 51-76256
- GNIS feature ID: 1500182
- Website: townofstuartva.com

Stuart is a town in Patrick County, Virginia, United States, where it is the county seat. As of the 2020 census, Stuart had a population of 1,431. The town of Stuart was named after Confederate Gen. J. E. B. Stuart, of nearby Ararat, Virginia.

== History ==
=== Incorporation (1753–1830) ===
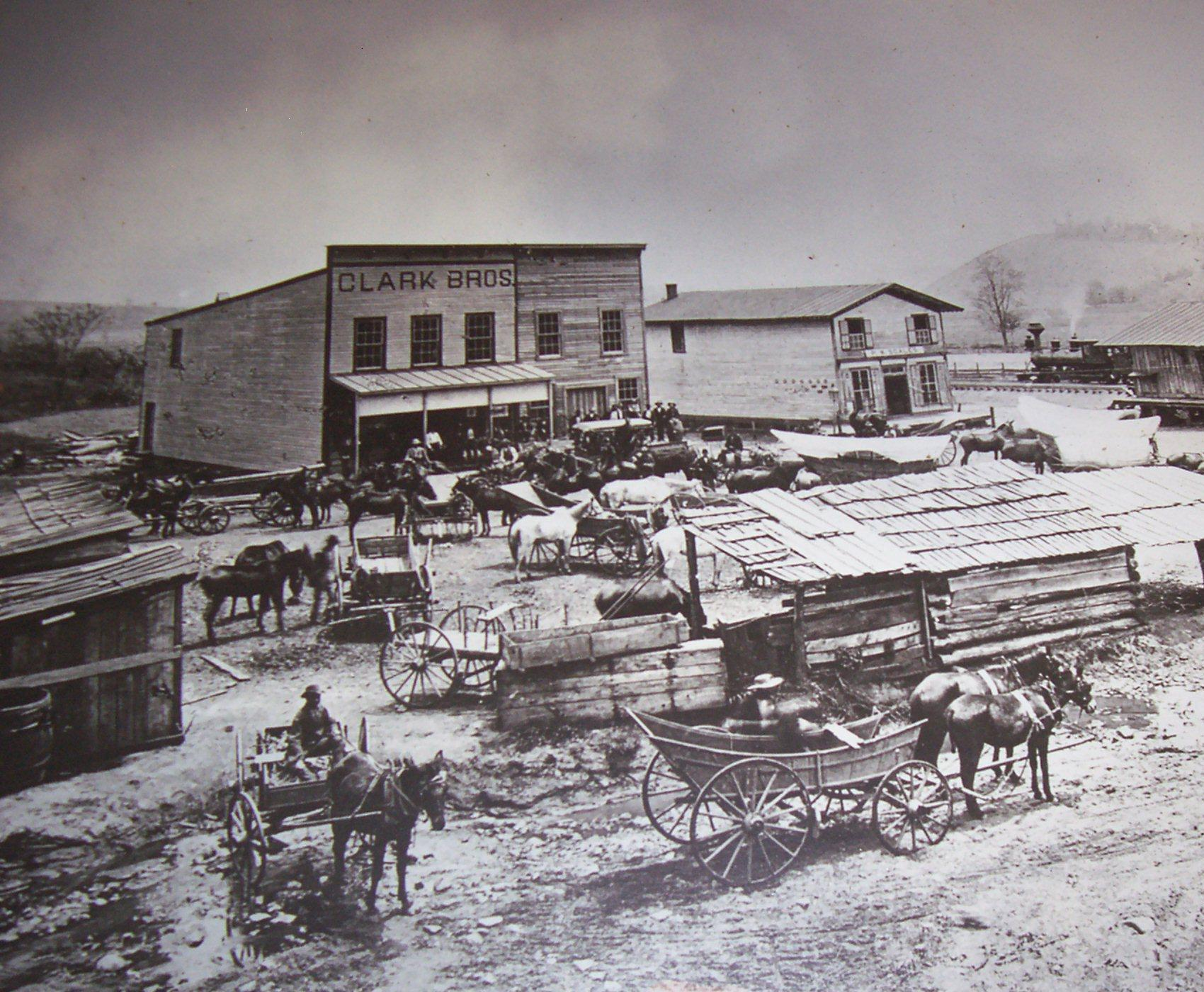
Stuart Train Depot, ca 1895

The Town of Stuart was first incorporated as Taylorsville, Virginia, in 1792, in honor of early settler George Taylor. Stuart has been the county seat of Patrick County since 1791, when the county was organized from territory of Henry County. Captain Eliphaz Shelton of the Patrick County Revolutionary War Militia donated the land for the construction of a new courthouse and town subdivided from his plantation. The Patrick County Courthouse was built in the center of the town. What is now designated as the Stuart Uptown Historic District encompasses the historic core of the county seat. It includes government, financial, religious, and commercial buildings dating from the mid-nineteenth to the mid-twentieth centuries.

=== Antebellum (1831–1860) ===
By 1850, Taylorsville had grown to include approximately 50 dwellings and businesses. The 1850 census reported 18 households with 50 adults (including 29 boarders) and 60 children living in the area of the courthouse. Occupations listed included four farmers, two innkeepers, three merchants, attorneys, two physicians, two cabinetmakers, two saddlers, one harness maker, three tailors, one bricklayer, nine laborers, a clerk, a mail carrier, and a sheriff with two deputies. The Danville and Wytheville Turnpike, the predecessor to the present-day U.S. Route 58, was established in the 1850s. In 1848, the Richmond and Danville Railroad was chartered, and tracks were completed to Danville by 1856.

=== Civil War, reconstruction and growth (1860–1916) ===
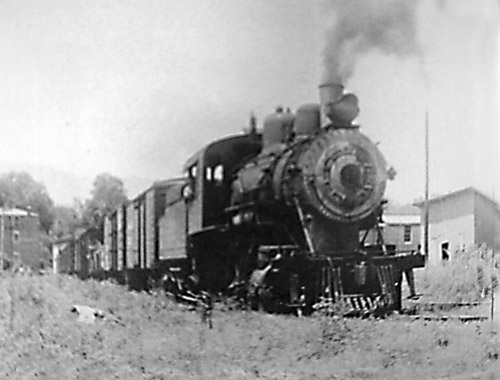
Engine, Danville and Western Railway, ca. 1900

Following the economic difficulties of the Civil War, the residents of Taylorsville focused their energies on expanding railroads to connect to markets and boost the economy. The Danville and New River Railroad was chartered in 1873, with the line completed to Martinsville, Virginia in nearby Henry County by 1881. In 1883, citizens of Patrick County approved a bond of $150,000 to expand the line. The first train pulled into Taylorsville in August 1884. With the growth associated with the railroad, Taylorsville was incorporated as a town in 1884 and was renamed Stuart in honor of Confederate Major General J.E.B. Stuart, who was born 20 miles west of town in Ararat, Virginia.

Following the completion of the railroad, the town of Stuart continued to grow steadily. The population increased 25% from 300 in 1884 to 371 in 1900. While occupations continued to center around the courthouse functions and the typical needs of a trading center, the 1900 census reflects the influence of the railroad by recording four railroad employees, eight salesmen, one insurance agent, one mining engineer, and one timber dealer. Five teachers, three hotels, two druggists, and two bartenders also indicate the growth of the town. The construction of the railroad led to the distinction of "uptown" and "downtown" Stuart. The original courthouse village was situated at the crest of a hill. An industrial and commercial area developed adjacent to the railroad, which was located further downhill along the flats of the Mayo River. "Uptown" continued to serve as the center of the town with the courthouse, churches, school, attorneys' offices, banks, hotels, and stores. The two areas, however, were closely related and interdependent; the town's first telephone line at the turn of the twentieth century was run between the railroad depot downtown and the Hotel Perkins uptown.

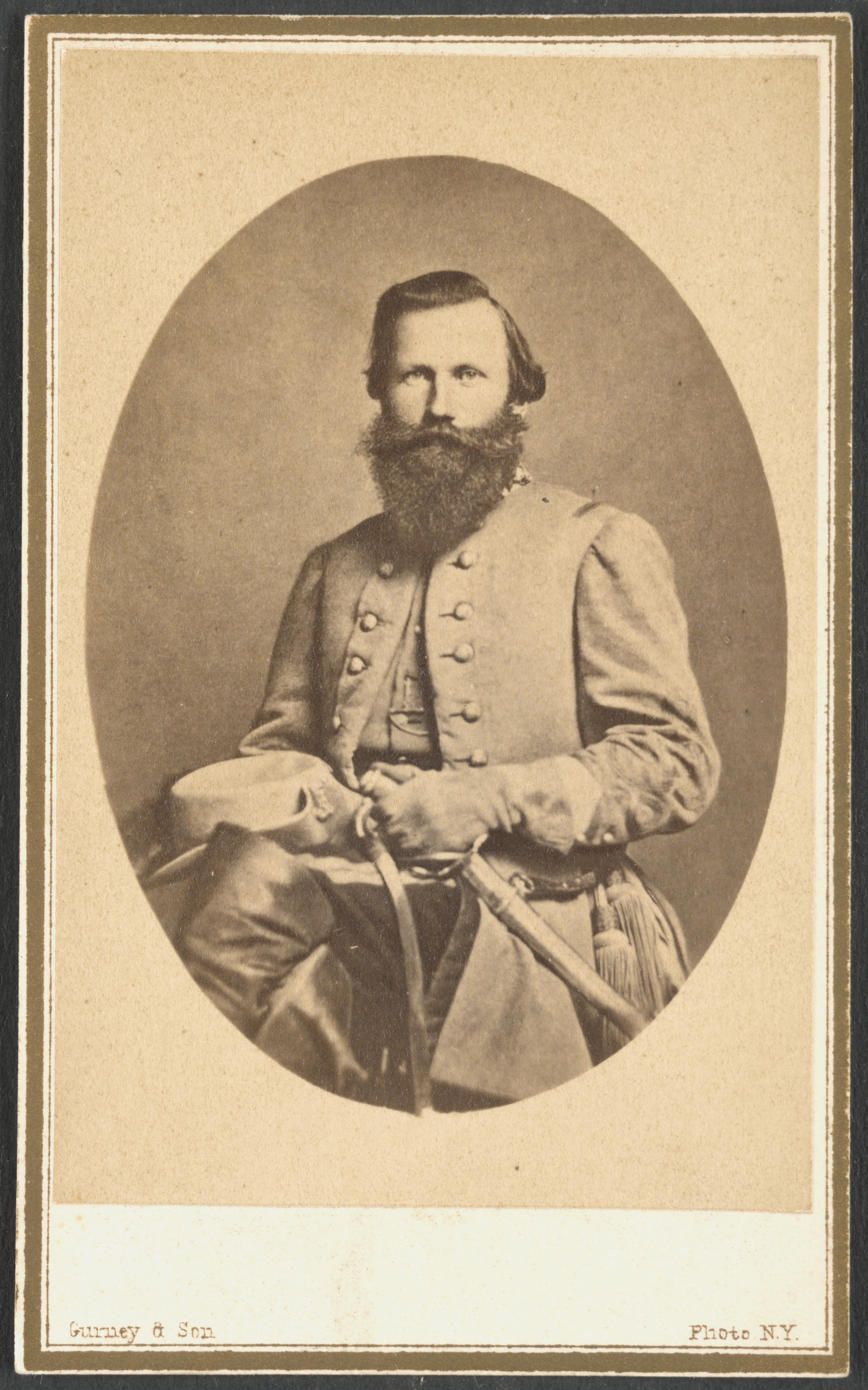
General J. E. B. Stuart, namesake of Stuart, Virginia

=== World War I to World War II (1917–1945) ===
Before 1915, no public water or sewer system was available. People gained their drinking water from private wells or from nearby springs. There were no streetlights, and oil lamps were used for interior lighting, the roads were unpaved and the sidewalks were wooden. After the water system was installed, it was well received. By 1926 the population of the town had increased so much that improvements needed to be made.

In 1916, the Clark Power and Light Company established the first electric light system in Stuart. Each customer was charged a flat rate of $1.25 per month, and if 300 citizens bought into the system, Clark would allow the lights to burn all night. The Stuart Power and Light Company bought them out, and they were sold to the Virginia East Coast Utilities Company. In 1938, during the Great Depression, the Appalachian Electric Power Company bought them out. Joseph H. Vipperman, a Stuart native, was the president of this company when its name was changed to American Electric Power. The first telegraph was installed in Stuart with completion of the railroad here in 1884.

Reportedly the first telephone was operated at the Hotel Perkins. By 1923, ten lines served the county, each with a central; the Stuart central was located in the home of Walter S. Gilbert. In 1937, the Lee Telephone Company acquired all the private lines. In 1974, the Central Telephone Company of Virginia bought out the Lee Company. Years later Sprint/Centel bought them out and now Centurylink serves Patrick County.

Travel to Stuart was difficult until the first hard-paved road reached Stuart from Martinsville in 1925. In 1929, a nine-mile stretch from Stuart to the North Carolina state line south was paved and improved. In 1930, the three miles to Cruzes (Cruises) Store was paved, and in 1932, the road was extended to Hillsville, Virginia. Today, State Routes 8 and U.S. Route 58 serve the town and the county, and other counties along its east-to-west stretch. Route 58 is a four-lane divided highway, crossing the entire Commonwealth, as well as Patrick County.

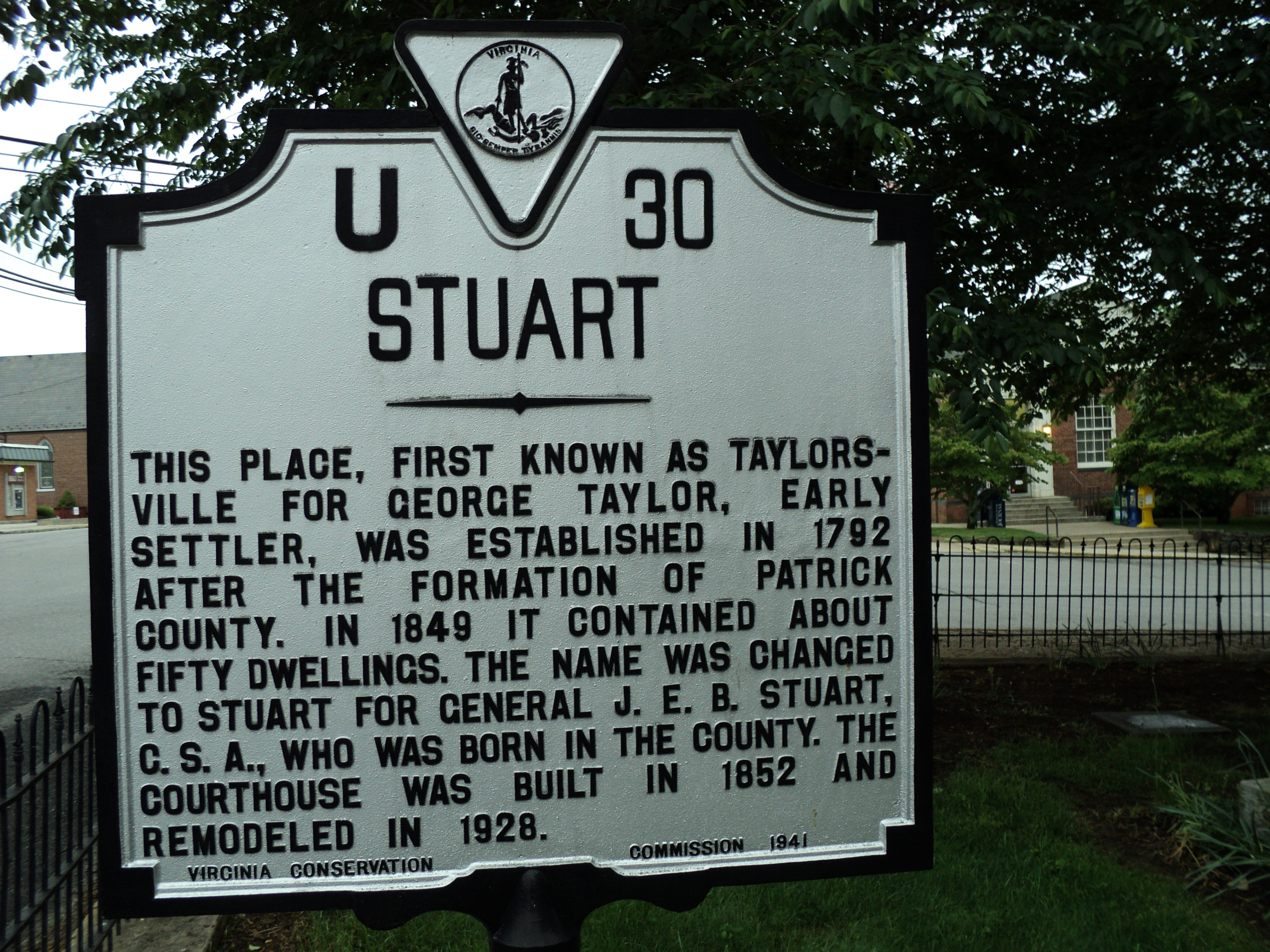
Virginia state historic marker, Stuart

By 1940, the population of Stuart had increased to 600 and the majority of the buildings standing today had been constructed. The Patrick County Bank (established in 1890 and later merged with the Bank of Stuart in 1926) constructed its large Classical building directly across from the courthouse in 1911. The two uptown churches, Stuart United Methodist Church and the Stuart Baptist Church, constructed their present-day structures in the early twentieth-century.

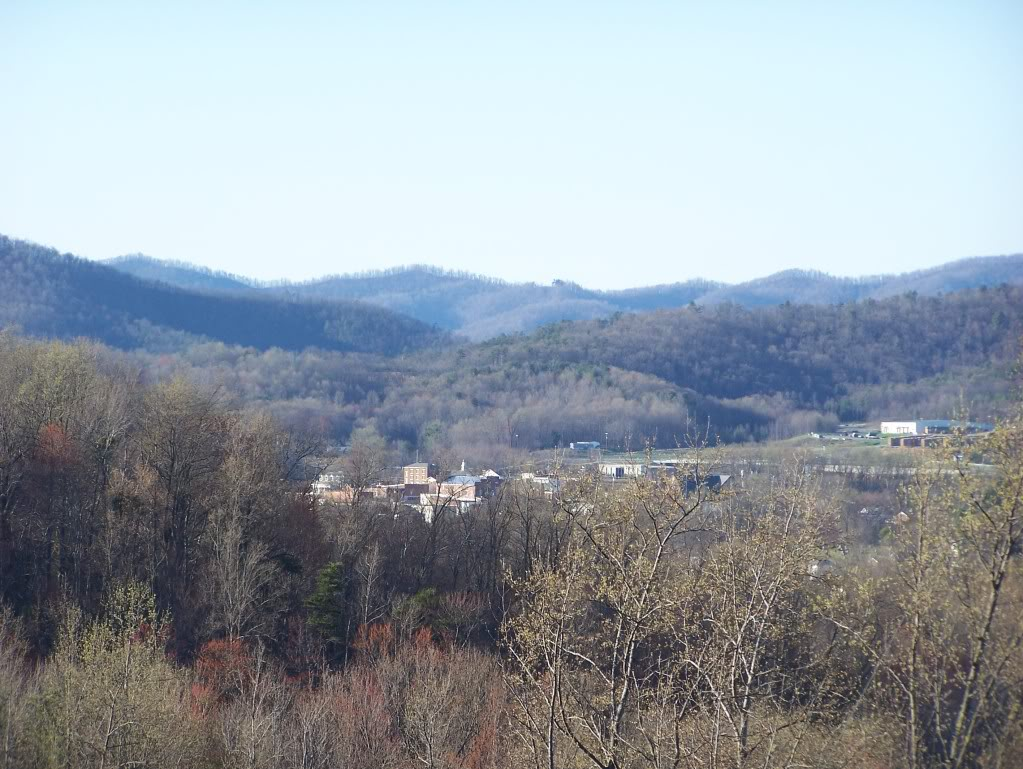
Stuart nestled within the Blue Ridge Mountains

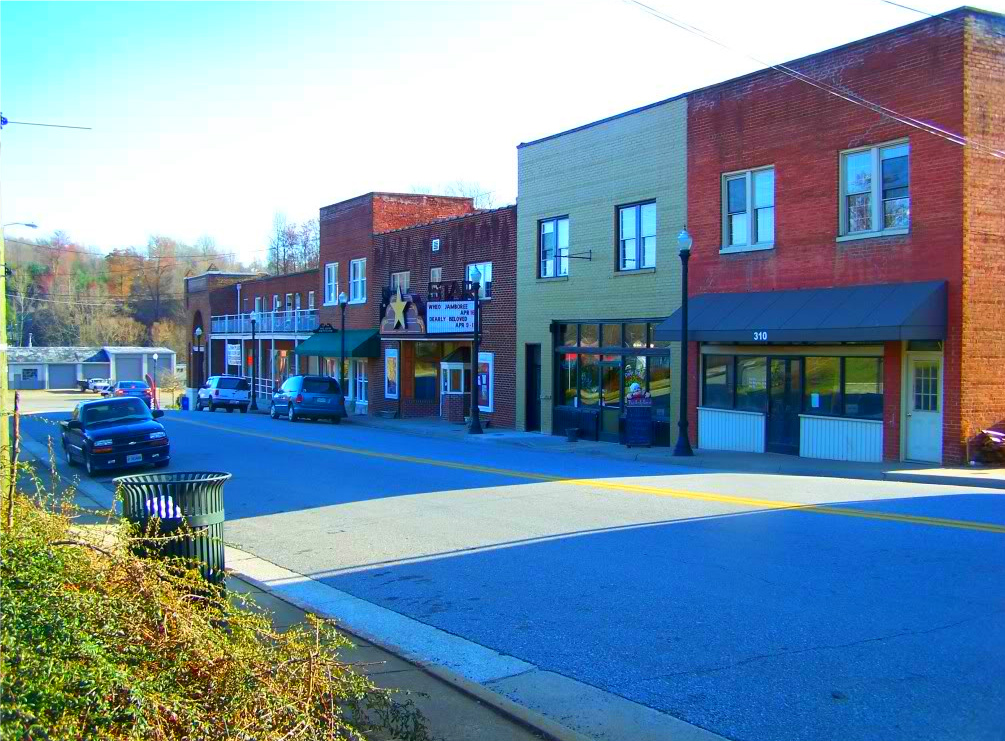
Historical Street in Downtown Stuart

=== Present day ===
Stuart is a town for all age groups. It has a burgeoning downtown and recent retail developments along the Highway 58 corridor. New additions include the downtown rail trail along the Mayo River, a new Farmer's Market located within the heart of town, and new sidewalk and infrastructure improvements along Main Street.

The Stuart Uptown Historic District, Goblintown Mill, and Patrick County Courthouse are listed on the National Register of Historic Places.

== Geography ==
Stuart is located at 36°38′25″N 80°16′26″W (36.640197, −80.273940).

According to the United States Census Bureau, the town has a total area of 0.7 square mile (1.9 km^{2}), all land.

The town of Stuart is a hilly community within a small valley surrounded by the Blue Ridge Mountains. The Mayo River runs through the heart of town, down through Patrick County.

=== Climate ===
Climate data for Stuart, Virginia (1991–2020 normals, extremes 1913–present)
Month	Jan	Feb	Mar	Apr	May	Jun	Jul	Aug	Sep	Oct	Nov	Dec	Year
Record high °F (°C)	79 (26)	82 (28)	88 (31)	95 (35)	98 (37)	101 (38)	105 (41)	102 (39)	99 (37)	95 (35)	88 (31)	86 (30)	105 (41)
Mean daily maximum °F (°C)	48.1 (8.9)	51.9 (11.1)	59.3 (15.2)	69.6 (20.9)	76.4 (24.7)	82.8 (28.2)	86.1 (30.1)	84.6 (29.2)	79.3 (26.3)	70.6 (21.4)	60.0 (15.6)	51.2 (10.7)	68.3 (20.2)
Daily mean °F (°C)	36.7 (2.6)	39.5 (4.2)	46.2 (7.9)	55.6 (13.1)	63.9 (17.7)	71.2 (21.8)	74.8 (23.8)	73.5 (23.1)	67.8 (19.9)	57.4 (14.1)	46.9 (8.3)	39.7 (4.3)	56.1 (13.4)
Mean daily minimum °F (°C)	25.2 (−3.8)	27.2 (−2.7)	33.1 (0.6)	41.6 (5.3)	51.3 (10.7)	59.5 (15.3)	63.5 (17.5)	62.3 (16.8)	56.3 (13.5)	44.2 (6.8)	33.8 (1.0)	28.3 (−2.1)	43.9 (6.6)
Record low °F (°C)	−17 (−27)	−5 (−21)	2 (−17)	15 (−9)	29 (−2)	31 (−1)	46 (8)	44 (7)	33 (1)	21 (−6)	7 (−14)	−3 (−19)	−17 (−27)
Average precipitation inches (mm)	4.13 (105)	3.15 (80)	4.04 (103)	4.18 (106)	5.00 (127)	5.25 (133)	5.36 (136)	5.18 (132)	5.05 (128)	3.50 (89)	3.36 (85)	4.08 (104)	52.28 (1,328)
Average snowfall inches (cm)	2.0 (5.1)	2.1 (5.3)	0.5 (1.3)	0.1 (0.25)	0.0 (0.0)	0.0 (0.0)	0.0 (0.0)	0.0 (0.0)	0.0 (0.0)	0.0 (0.0)	0.0 (0.0)	1.7 (4.3)	6.4 (16)
Average precipitation days (≥ 0.01 in)	9.6	8.6	9.8	10.4	12.4	12.5	13.2	12.1	10.1	8.9	8.3	10.0	125.9
Average snowy days (≥ 0.1 in)	1.0	1.1	0.4	0.1	0.0	0.0	0.0	0.0	0.0	0.0	0.0	0.5	3.1
Source: NOAA

== Demographics ==
Historical population
Census	Pop.	Note	%±
1890	332		—
1900	371		11.7%
1910	388		4.6%
1920	401		3.4%
1930	588		46.6%
1940	720		22.4%
1950	849		17.9%
1960	974		14.7%
1970	947		−2.8%
1980	1,131		19.4%
1990	965		−14.7%
2000	961		−0.4%
2010	1,408		46.5%
2020	1,431		1.6%
U.S. Decennial Census

As of the 2010 census, there were 1,408 people, 629 households, and 315 families residing in the town. The population density was 1,301.5 people per square mile (501.4/km^{2}). There were 726 housing units at an average density of 698.8 per square mile (269.2/km^{2}). The racial makeup of the town was 86.4% White, 8.9% African American, 1.8% from other races, and 1.5% from two or more races. Hispanic or Latino of any race were 3.1% of the population.

There were 449 households, out of which 25.8% had children under the age of 18 living with them, 35.9% were married couples living together, 14.7% had a female householder with no husband present, and 45.0% were non-families. 42.1% of all households were made up of individuals, and 19.8% had someone living alone who was 65 years of age or older. The average household size was 2.09 and the average family size was 2.85.

In the town, the population was spread out, with 22.4% under the age of 18, 9.3% from 18 to 24, 25.6% from 25 to 44, 23.0% from 45 to 64, and 19.8% who were 65 years of age or older. The median age was 40 years. For every 100 females, there were 85.5 males. For every 100 females aged 18 and over, there were 82.8 males.

The median income for a household in the town was $20,192, and the median income for a family was $35,000. Males had a median income of $29,375 versus $19,938 for females. The per capita income for the town was $16,265. About 21.3% of families and 24.1% of the population were below the poverty line, including 36.2% of those under age 18 and 20.1% of those age 65 or over.

== Education ==
The Patrick County Public School System offers six elementary schools and one high school, with Stuart Elementary School and Patrick County High School lying within the town's boundaries. The high school, which serves approximately 1,000 students in grades 8–12, is fully accredited with the Southern Association of Colleges and Schools. Stuart Elementary provides a pre-kindergarten to seventh grade level education for approximately 500 students each year. The school consistently ranks within the top schools in Virginia in the Standards of Learning Testing program, as well as many other areas of academic excellence. Patrick County High School recently became District and Regional Academic Champions, as well as winning a plethora of accolades throughout the academic and athletic fields, such as Regional Cross Country Champions, District Football Champions, Regional Women's Basketball Champions, and multiple District Tennis Champions. They too have a proud academic history and were also ranked as one of the top public high schools in the Commonwealth of Virginia. In their annual public high school rankings, U.S. News & World Report ranked Patrick County High School as one of the top schools in America.

== Public services ==
The town of Stuart has the first hospital in the Commonwealth of Virginia to be designated as a Critical Access Hospital. Public water and sewer services are offered to residents in the Stuart-Patrick Springs area through the Stuart Water and Sewer Plant, as well as a public waste field just outside town. The town does not offer an airport. The local media outlets are the 1270 AM WHEO Radio Station, Cable 5 TV, and The Enterprise, the town's weekly newspaper.

== Notable events ==
Stuart has an annual festival, the Easter Brothers' Homecoming Gospel Sing, held every July in Dominion Valley Park. The celebration honors the Easter Brothers, a local group that gained national fame. Stuart also hosts the oldest continuous beach music festival on the East Coast, "Hot Fun in the Summertime" presented by the Virginia Jaycees. Other major attractions include the Virginia Peach Festival, The Stuart Apple Dumpling and Strawberry Festivals, The Stuart Food and Wine Festival, The 4th of July Celebration, The Patrick County Fair, and the annual musical events featured on the Crooked Road Music Trail.

== Notable people ==
- Gerald Baliles, 65th governor of Virginia
- Martin Clark, author and Virginia Circuit Court judge
- Brad Clontz, professional baseball player who pitched six seasons in the major leagues
- Beatrice Farnham, artist
- Turner Foddrell, Piedmont blues and folk acoustic guitarist, singer and songwriter
- Chris Pritt, member of the West Virginia House of Delegates
- Mary Sue Terry, first female attorney general of Virginia
- Wood Brothers, the NASCAR team
