= Kristin Baker (painter) =

American artist (born 1975)

- Born: 1975 (age 50–51); Stamford, Connecticut
- Known for: Painting

Kristin Baker (born 1975, in Stamford, Connecticut) is a painter based in New York. She often uses stencil and sign painting techniques on PVC panels.

Baker holds a BFA from the School of the Museum of Fine Arts / Tufts University, Boston (1998), and graduated from Yale’s MA Painting programme (2002).

Her work has been exhibited in many prominent international galleries and museums, including the Whitney Museum of American Art and PS1 Contemporary Art Centre in New York, the Pompidou Centre in Paris, the Royal Academy in London and The Hermitage Museum in St. Petersburg. Her work is featured in the Saatchi Collection, and she is represented by Deitch Projects, New York.

== Selected solo exhibitions ==
=== 2003 Flat Out and 2005 Fall Out ===
Baker’s solo debut in New York, Flat Out, was presented by Deitch Projects in September 2003 and her subsequent Los Angeles debut, Fall Out, was presented by Acme in March 2005. Both exhibitions continued the artist’s interest in auto racing by exploring, “the connection between painting and automobile racing, particularly by the contrast between accident versus control that characterizes both pursuits.”

In Debra Singer's article for Artforum the work is explained within a cultural context. “ Baker explains that she started to understand racing as a microcosm of American capitalism, given the sport’s inherent ties to technological innovation and corporate sponsorship.” But however specific the subject of auto racing may be, the work still maneuvers itself in the broader sense of painting. Singer explains, “Despite such culturally specific associations, many paintings transform representational details into predominantly formal elements, as in Ride to Live, Live to Ride, 2004. The up-close vantage of a moment immediately following an explosive crash, when smoke clouds the view of drivers and spectators alike, is dominated by vibrant, propulsive shards that radiate outward, interlacing with billowing flows of sooty haze. . The flurry of edges and forms, reminiscent of the ornamental impulse of the 1970s Pattern and Decoration movement, imbues the scene of destruction with a paradoxical, almost floral delicacy, as translucent and opaque layers of paint overlap like scraps of torn tissue, beautiful despite circumstance.”

Bakers paintings during this period are somewhere between the representational world and the abstract one. New York based writer Rebecca Spence spoke with Baker about this line in her article called Boundary Issues:

"In Baker’s wall-size Portrait of a Whatever Agricultural Excursion (2005), what at first appears to be an abstract pastiche of fluid shapes is, upon closer examination, an overturned race car. As her work has evolved over the past several years, Baker says she is less conscious of ‘riding the boundary’ between the historically disparate modes. 'I used to see them as two different things that I would bring together, but now I feel like they've dissolved into one another.'"

Flat Out also featured freestanding sculptural works such as Kurotoplac Kurve that the artist would explore further in subsequent shows.

=== 2007 Surge and Shadow ===
For her second solo at Deitch Projects, Baker started moving away from the subject of auto racing, but not from the movement and speed it allowed in prior work. Ethan Greenbaum notes:

“The large-scale installation features a series of painting hybrids as well as wall mounted, rectilinear works. Baker has jettisoned her racecar motif in favor of an expression of speed itself…Walking through the show, I thought of the Italian Futurists, all bluster and dark optimism about the mechanistic promise of the new century.”

Not only are the Futurists brought to mind, the work also bears references to Marcel Duchamp and Théodore Géricault. “A riff on Géricault’s “Raft of the Medusa” imagines it unpeopled and overcome by tattered waves; in a twist on Ab Ex gesture, frenzied brushstrokes are isolated, cleaned up, and tidily placed in the picture plane.”

The spectator is now turned from the movement and speed of the racetrack to the uncertainty of a raft in the stormy sea. Jennifer Gross writes, “Baker’s reconstitution of the raft is comparable to the animation of her race cars: both are blown apart and we are engaged with a heightened sense of an accumulation of moments in time. Although her mark-making is very controlled, calculated even, the spectator and the raft are immersed in a wave of painting, drowning in painting as a material fact. Like Géricault, Baker is using the conviction and excitement that only a contemporary incident, in her case the “mechanical” process of painting itself, to stimulate the work...What we see here is the rough anachronistic interface, the crash, between two traditions of high art: history painting, seen here as a dissipated raft and sublime landscape, and abstract painting embodied in crashing waves of color.

The other major work from Surge and Shadow is a sculptural piece entitled Flying Curve, Differential Manifold. Picking up from similar past works (Kurotoplac Kurve), Flying Curve, Differential Manifold is on a new scale. Again, Jennifer Gross explains that, “ Flying Curve is in part inspired by Marcel Duchamp’s last painting, Tu m’” and was “Duchamp’s farewell to painting.” However Baker’s aim is not an end to painting, but rather she seems inspired and challenged by the notion. “Baker has followed through on Duchamp’s conceptual curve ball to painting, speeding up and dispersing its forms at ten times its original scale, enveloping the viewer in sublime kaleidoscope of color and form. Baker’s work reveals her belief that painting still has somewhere to take us and that Duchamp’s theoretical endgame, embodied in Tu m’, took her down a path to painting despite Duchamp's protestations.”
