= List of primary state highways serving Virginia state institutions =

Highway system

In the US state of Virginia, some state highways have been specifically designated to serve state parks and state institutions. State Route 217 and the range of numbers from State Route 302 to State Route 399 are currently used (non-exclusively) for this purpose. For a list of very short Virginia primary state highways, see List of primary state highways in Virginia shorter than one mile.

== SR 217 ==
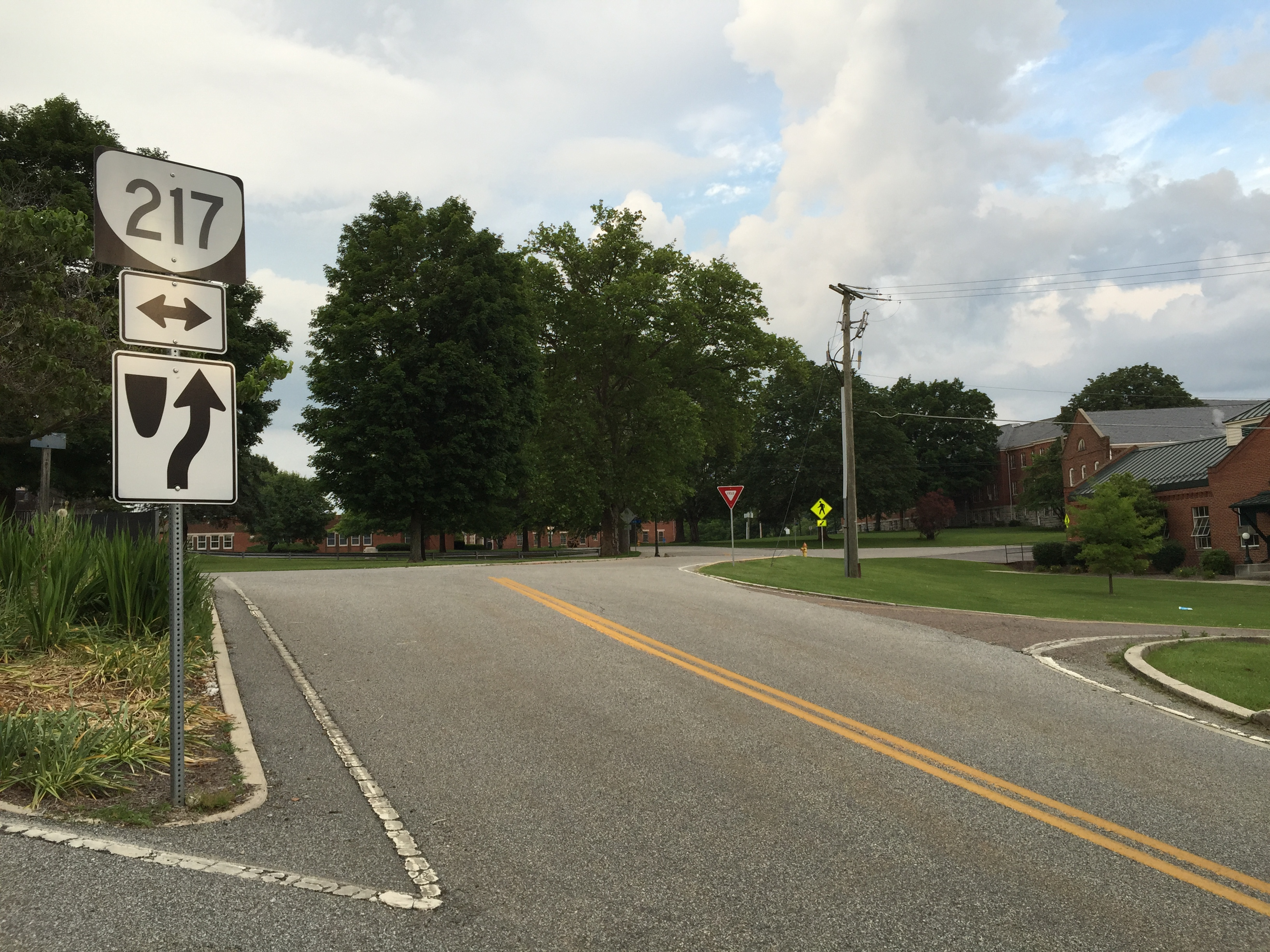
SR 217 in the Southwestern Virginia Mental Health Institute in Smyth County

State Route 217 is the designation for the roads on the grounds of the Southwestern Virginia Mental Health Institute (State Street, Morison Drive, Hospital Avenue) in Smyth County that are maintained by the Virginia Department of Transportation. The roads were added to the state highway system in 1932, and the number was in use by 1936.

== SR 302 ==
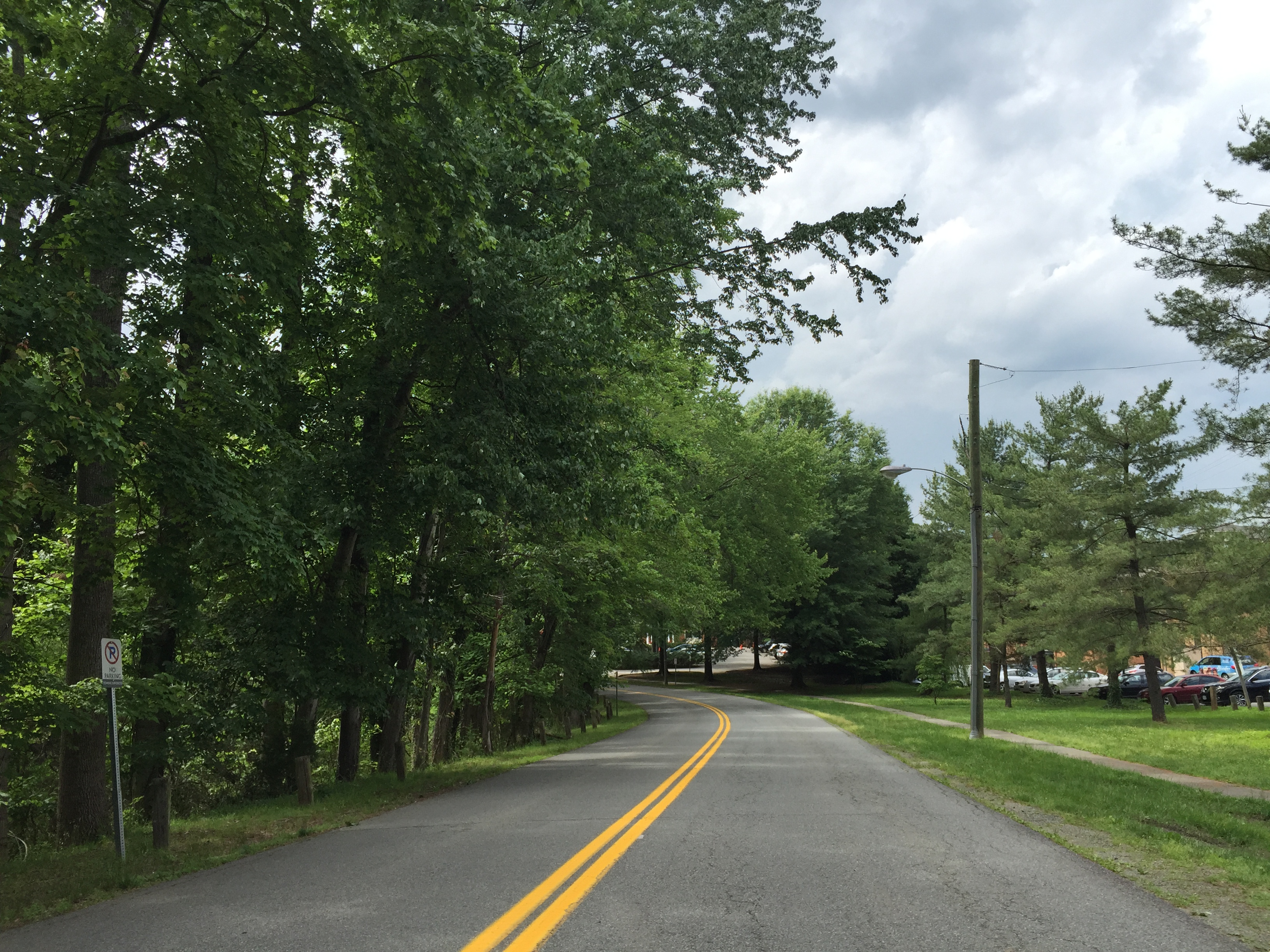
View west along SR 302 west of US 29 Business on the UVA Grounds in Charlottesville

State Route 302 is the designation for the roads on the Grounds of the University of Virginia in Albemarle County and the City of Charlottesville that are maintained by the Virginia Department of Transportation, including Copeley Road and Massie Road. The roads were added to the state highway system in 1932, and the number was in use by 1936.

== SR 303 ==
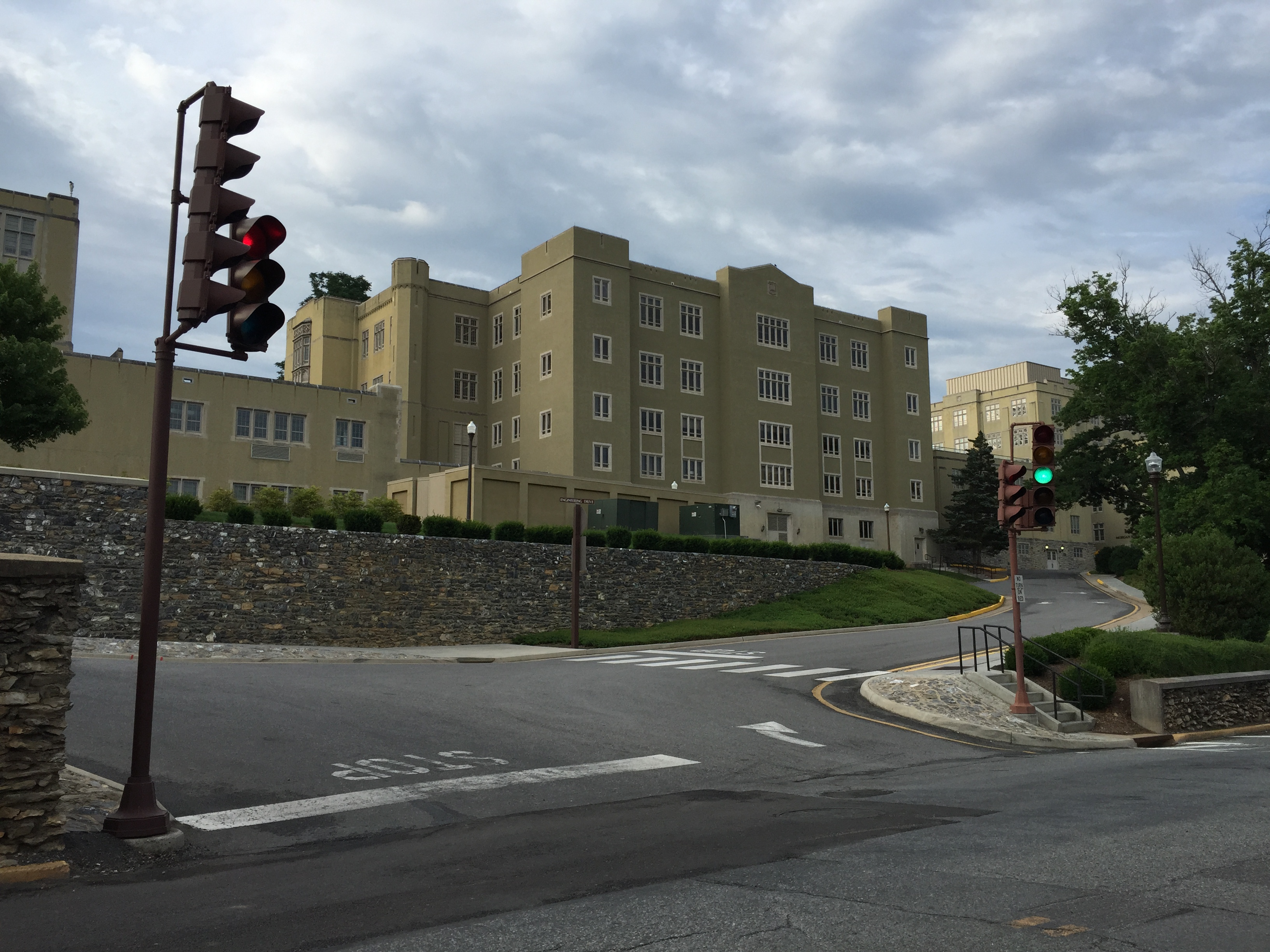
SR 303 at US 11 Bus. at the entrance to the Virginia Military Institute in Lexington

State Route 303 is the designation for the roads on the grounds of the Virginia Military Institute in the City of Lexington that are maintained by the Virginia Department of Transportation. The roads were added to the state highway system in 1932, and the number was in use by 1936.

== SR 305 ==
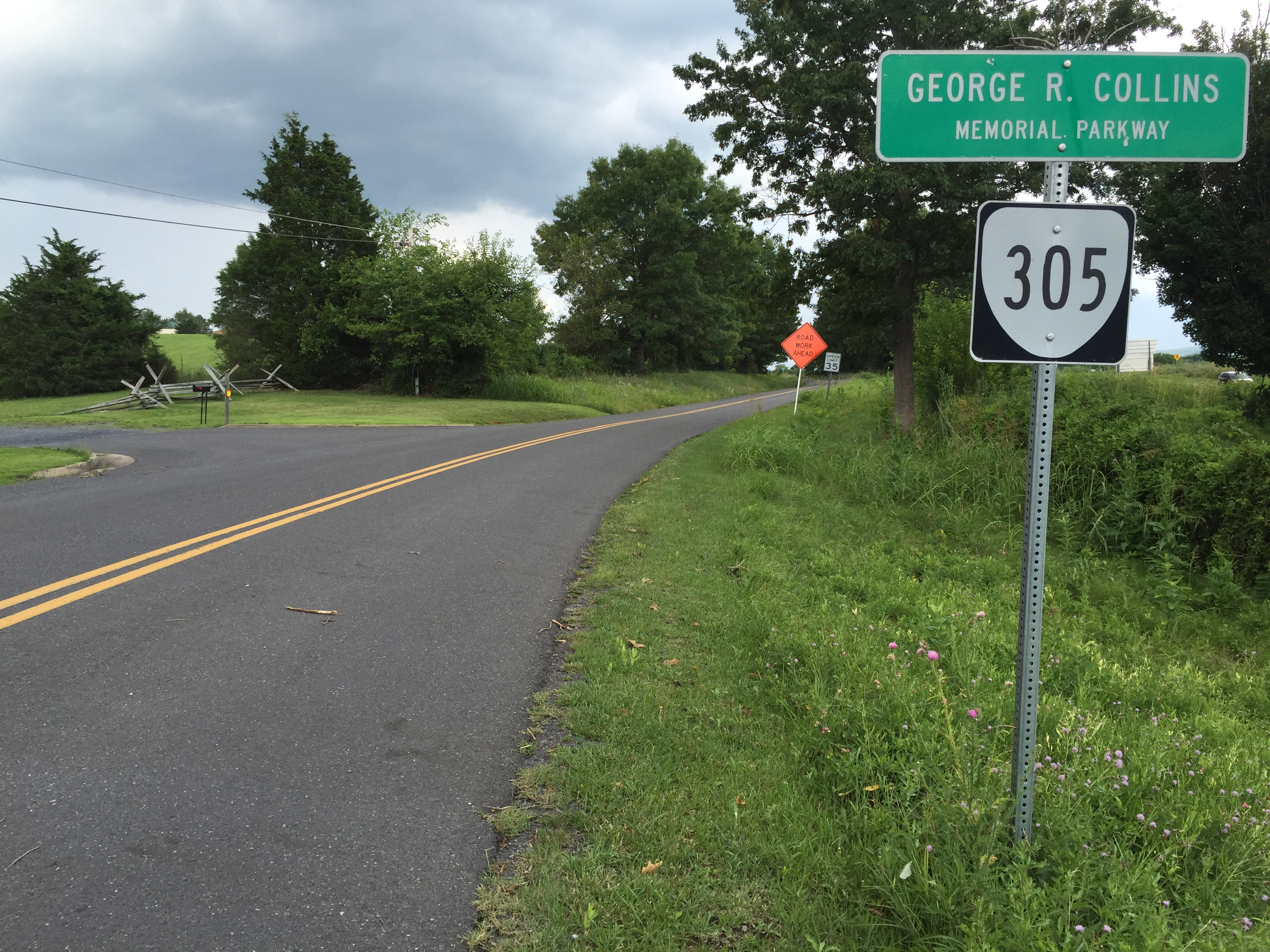
View north along SR 305 at SR 211 in New Market

State Route 305 is the designation for George Collins Parkway, the access road from SR 211 to the New Market Battlefield State Historical Park in Shenandoah County. The road was first designated in 1968, and the number was in use by 1971.

== SR 308 ==
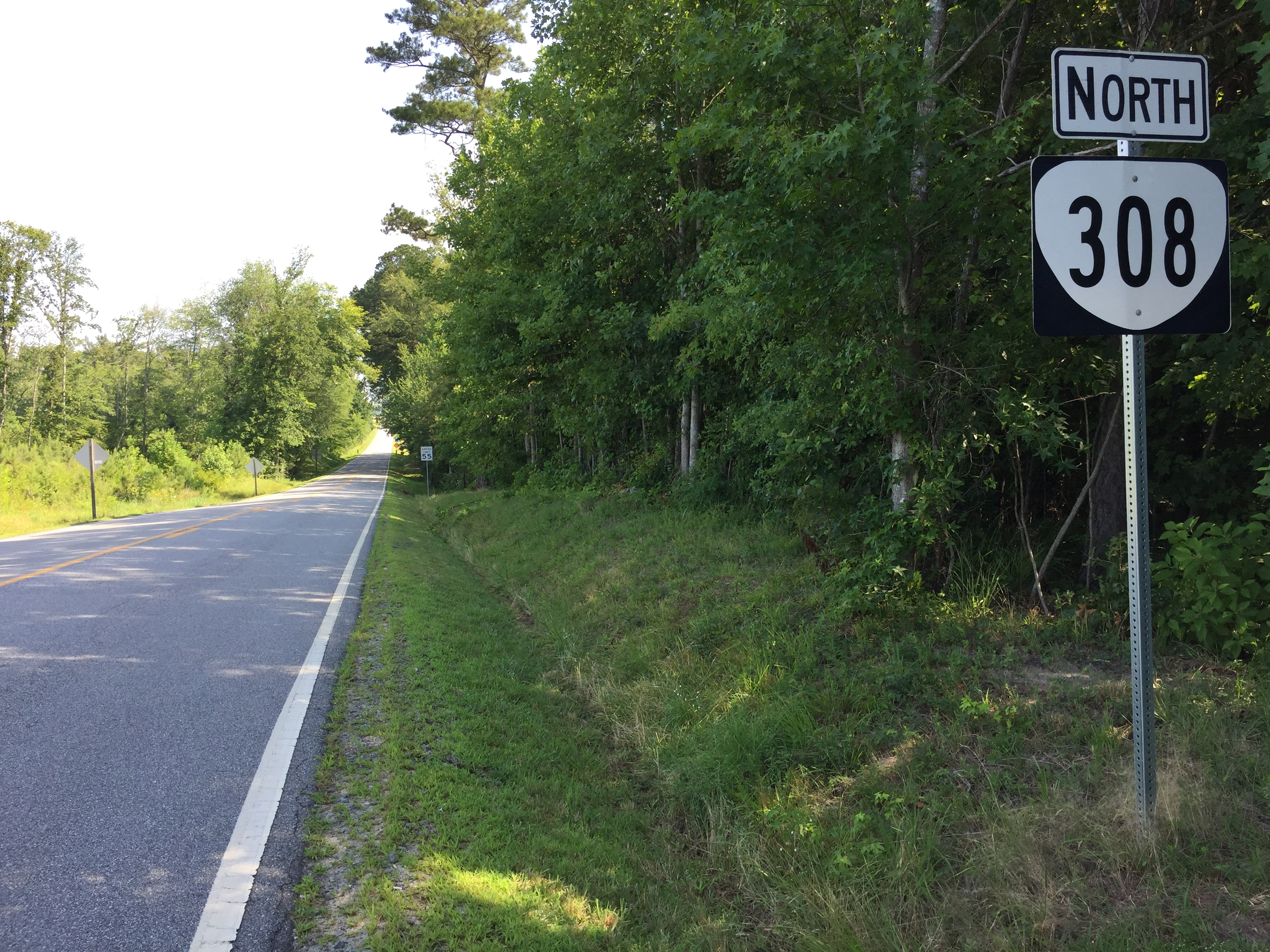
View north at the south end of SR 308 at US 58 in Angelico

State Route 308, Three Creeks Road, appeared in 1938 as a renumbering of part of SR 32 in Southampton County. In 1949 the part from SR 612 to SR 40 was made a secondary road, leaving behind the part of SR 308 from US 58 to just north of the Southampton Correctional Center, at a junction with SR 612 and SR 735.

== SR 310 ==
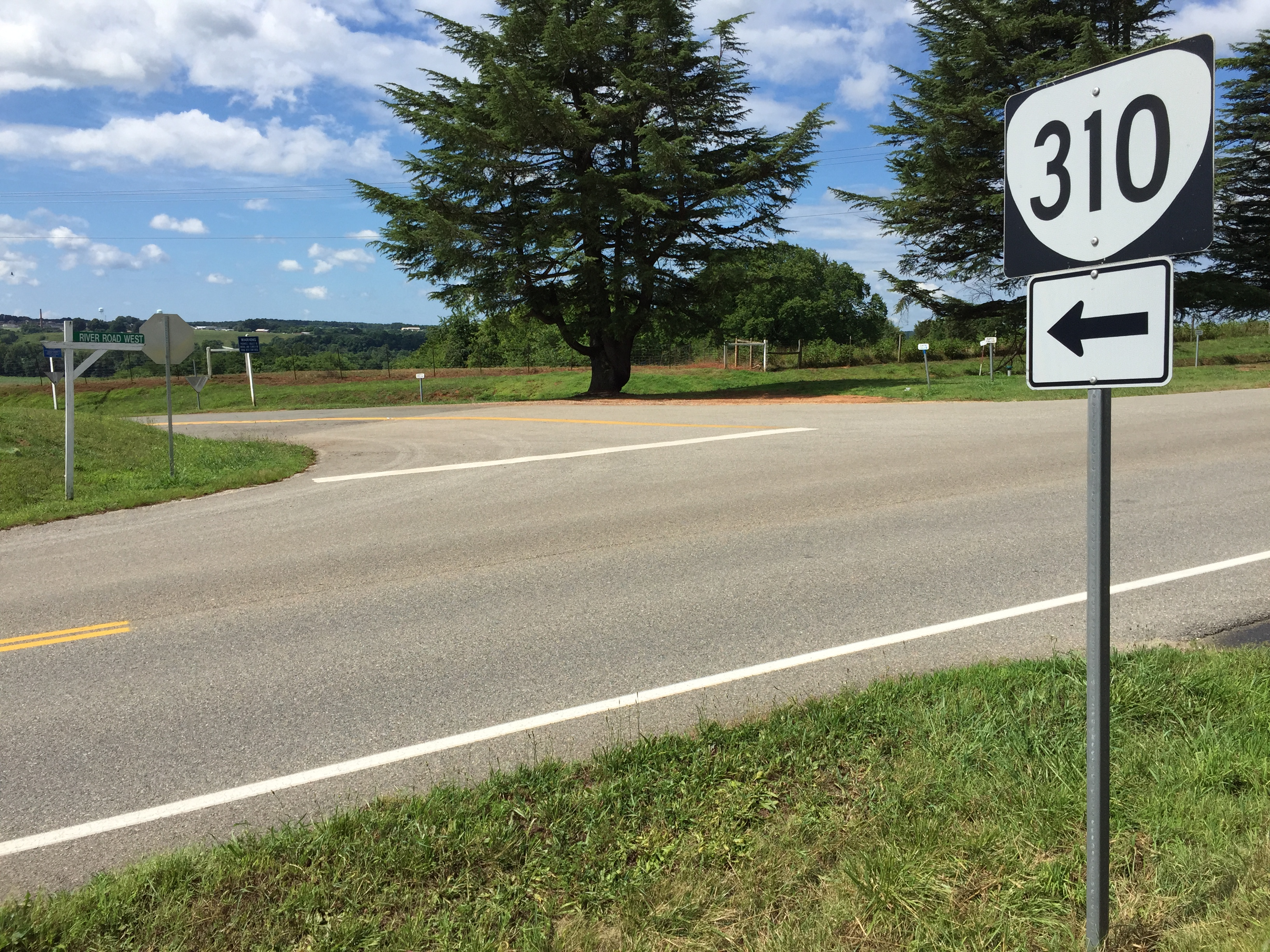
The west end of SR 310 at SR 6 at the James River Correctional Center in Goochland County

State Route 310 is the designation for State Farm Road, the access road from SR 6 to the now closed James River Correctional Center and back to SR 6 in Goochland County. The road was first designated in April 1991.

== SR 310 (former) ==
State Route 310 was the designation for the access road to the Virginia School for the Deaf and Blind in the City of Staunton. The road was first designated in June 1932, and was decommissioned before SR 310 was reassigned to the James River Correctional Center in 1990.

== SR 313 ==
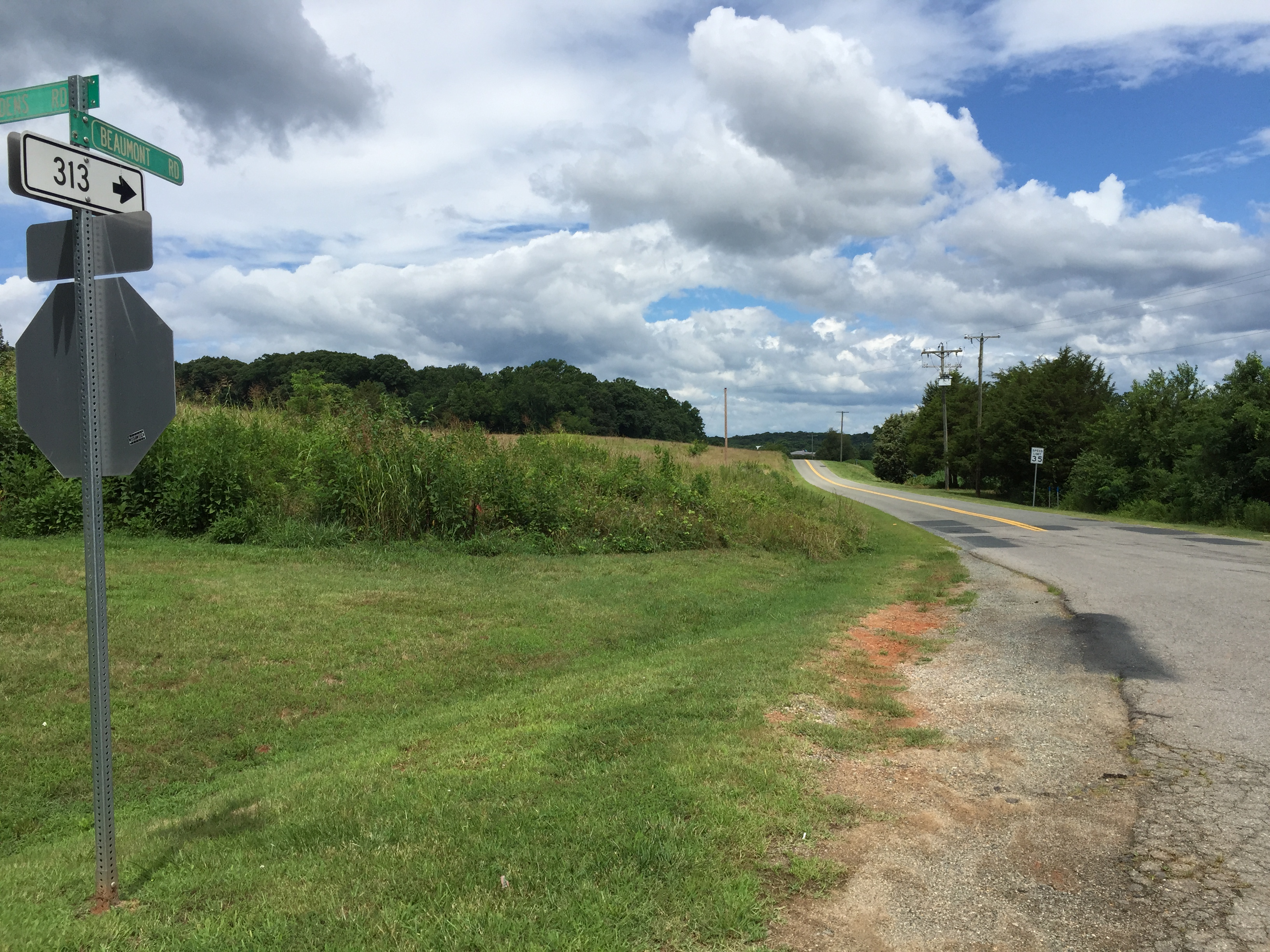
View west at the east end of SR 313 at US 522 in Powhatan County

State Route 313 is the designation for the access road from US 522 to the Beaumont Learning Center in Powhatan County. This designation also covers some (but not all) roads within the facility. It is unknown when the road was first designated, although the July 1932 CTB meeting minutes specifically mention this road.

== SR 314 ==
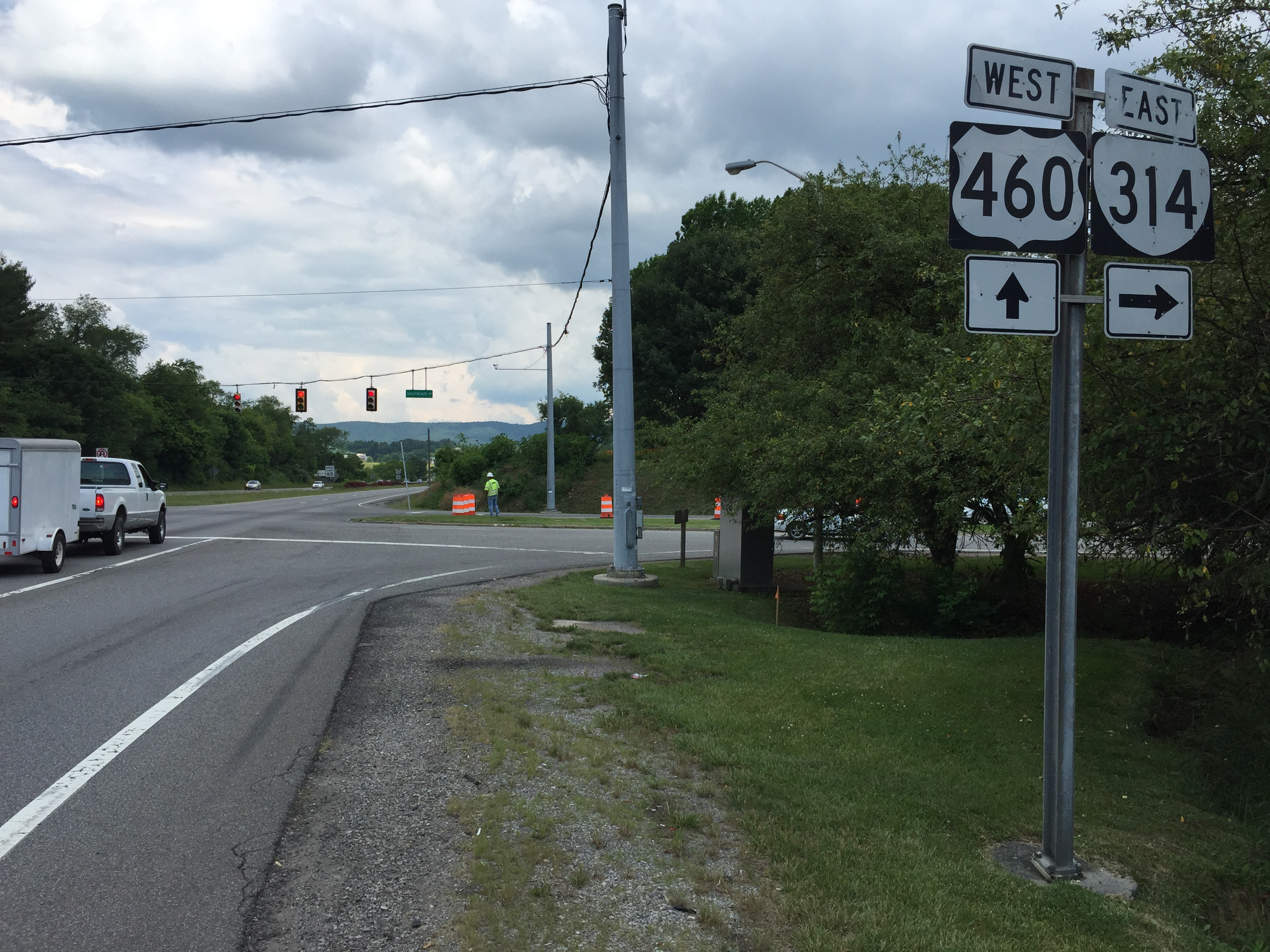
The former intersection of SR 314 at US 460 on the campus of Virginia Tech in Blacksburg. It was converted to an interchange, Exit 6, late in 2017.

State Route 314 is the designation for the roads on the grounds of the Virginia Polytechnic Institute and State University (Virginia Tech) in Montgomery County that are maintained by the Virginia Department of Transportation. The roads may have been added to the state highway system in 1932, and the number was in use by 1939.

== SR 315 ==
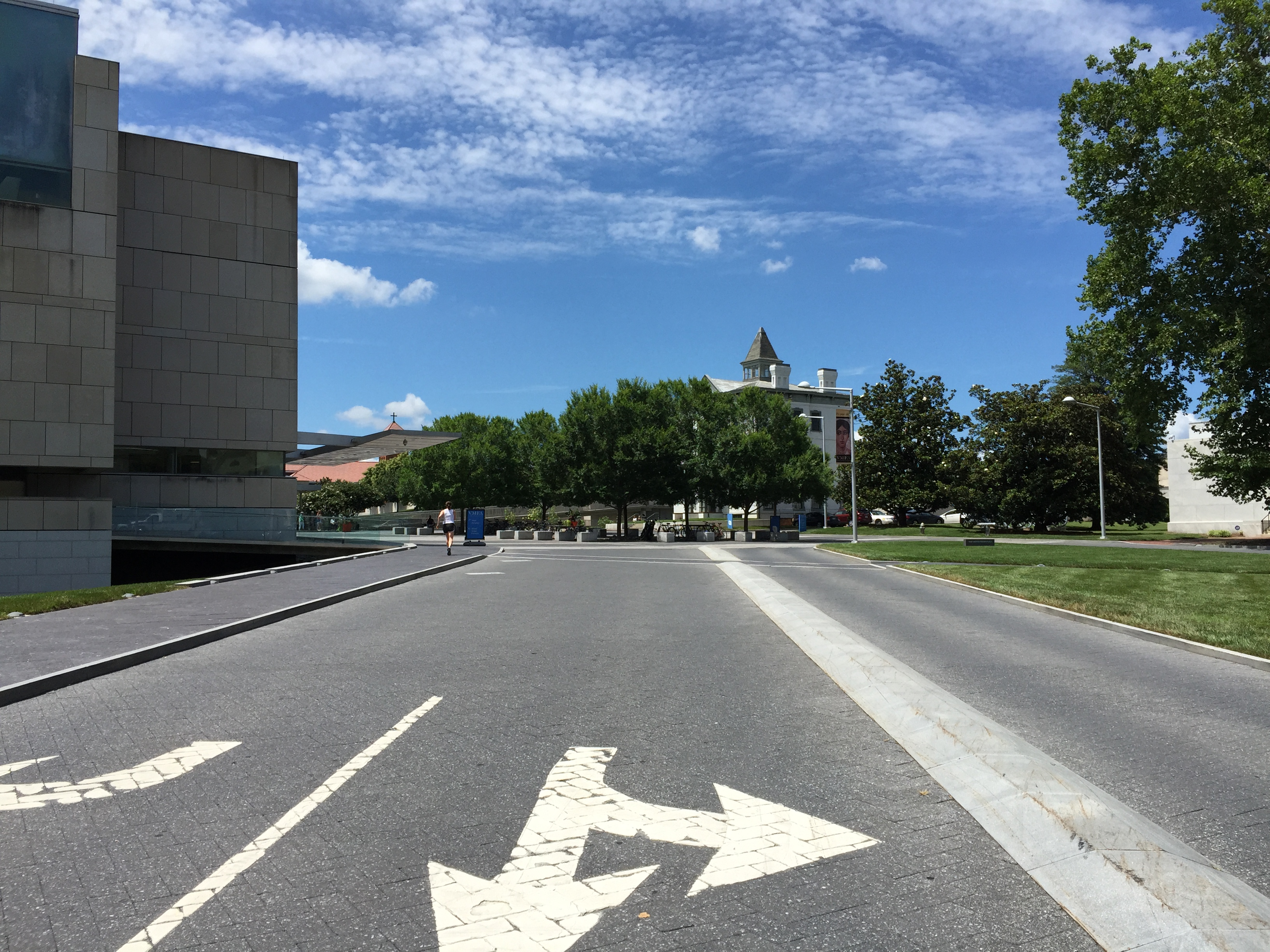
SR 315, the entrance from SR 161 to the Virginia Museum of Fine Arts in Richmond

State Route 315 is the designation for the access road into the Virginia Museum of Fine Arts in the City of Richmond. It is located off of SR 161.

== SR 317 ==
State Route 317 was the designation for the access road into the Blue Ridge Sanatorium in the City of Charlottesville. It connected the sanatorium with SR 20. It was first commissioned in July 1932, and was decommissioned in April 2002.

== SR 318 ==
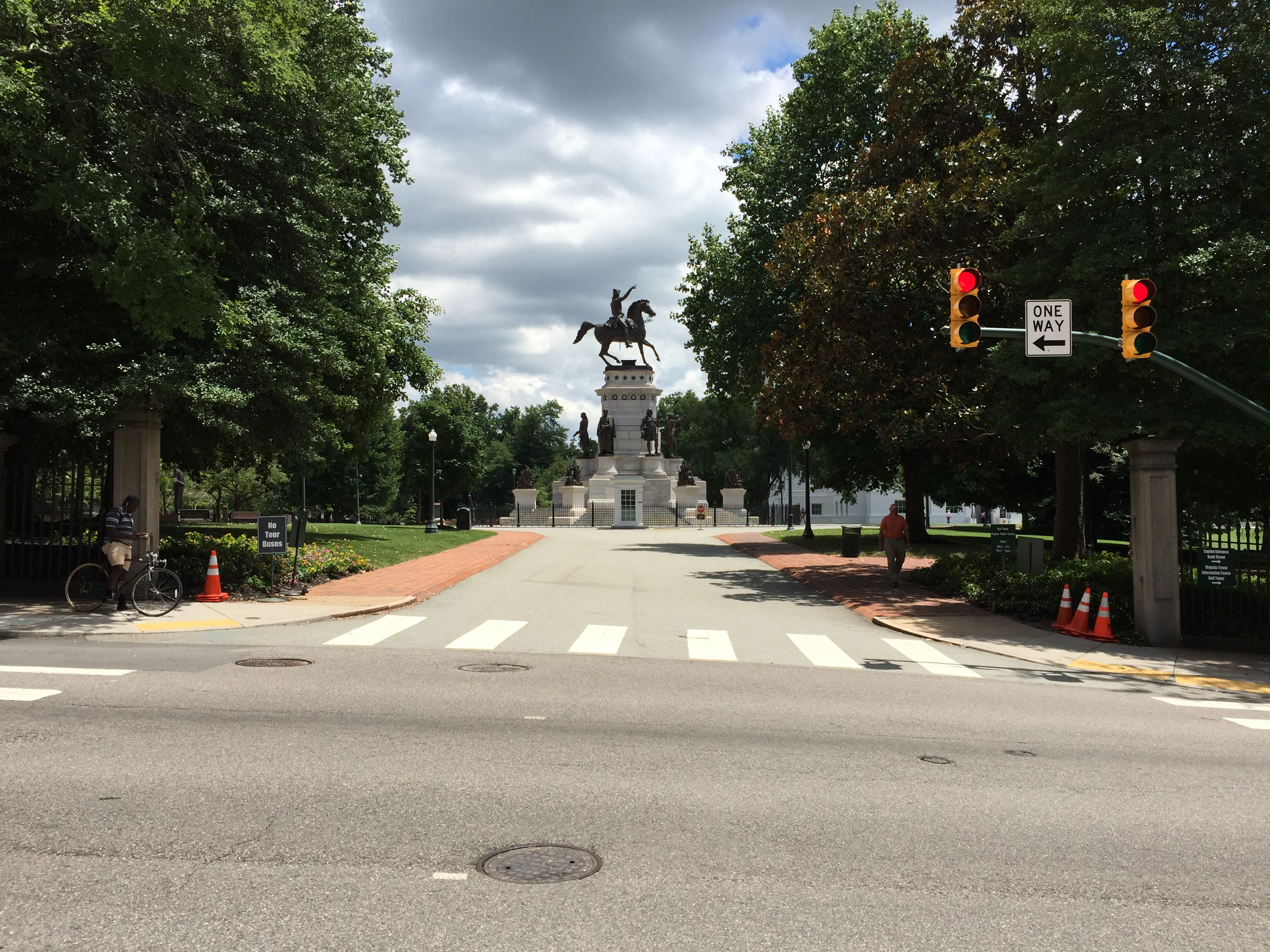
SR 318, the entrance from Ninth Street to the Virginia State Capitol in Richmond

State Route 318 is the designation for the access road to the Virginia State Capitol from Ninth Street in the City of Richmond. Because of the nature of the building it accesses, one needed to have a proper pass to drive on this road until December 2019, when the designation was slightly extended to cover four nearby publicly-accessible roads. It is unknown when this road was first commissioned, but it may have been as early as 1941.

== SR 319 ==
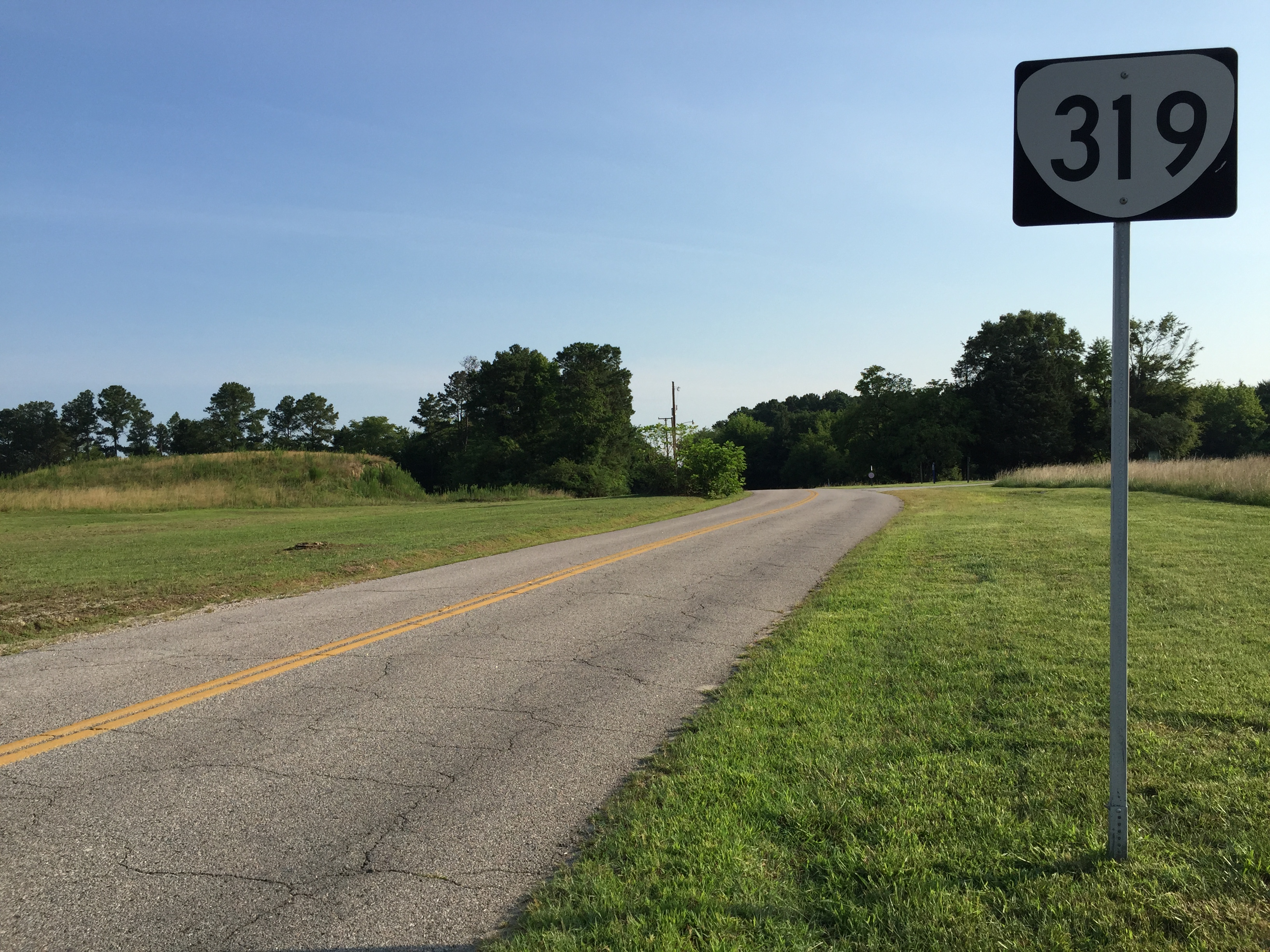
View north at the south end of SR 319 at SR 142 at the Central State Hospital southwest of Petersburg

State Route 319 is the designation for 7th Avenue, the access road to the Central State Hospital just outside Petersburg in Dinwiddie County. It connects US 1/US 460 Business with SR 142.

== SR 320 ==
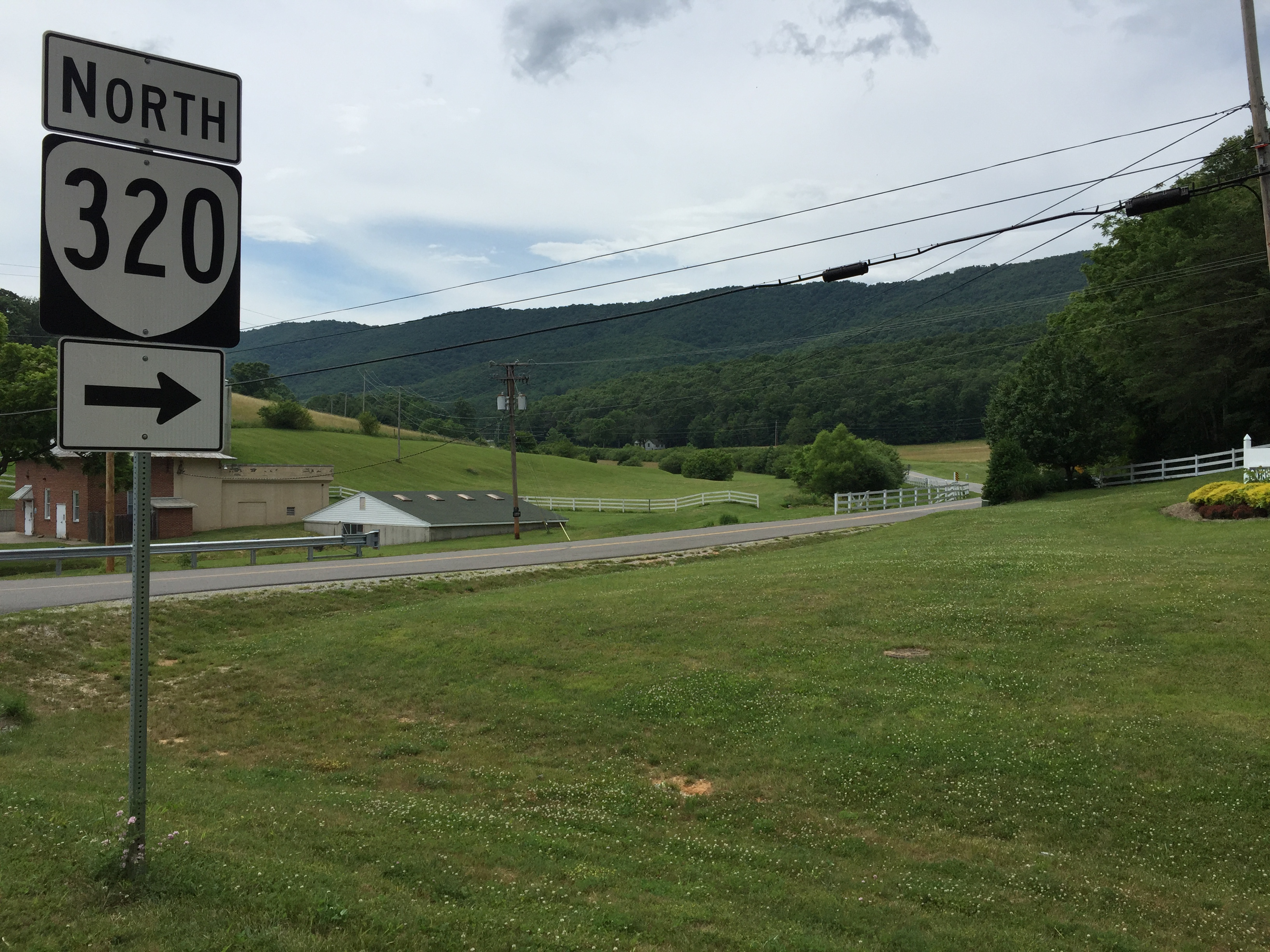
View north along SR 320 at SR 779 in Catawba

State Route 320 is the designation for Catawba Hospital Drive, the access road to the Catawba State Hospital in Roanoke County. It connects SR 779 with SR 698. This road first appeared as a renumbering of then-SR 123 in 1941.

== SR 321 ==
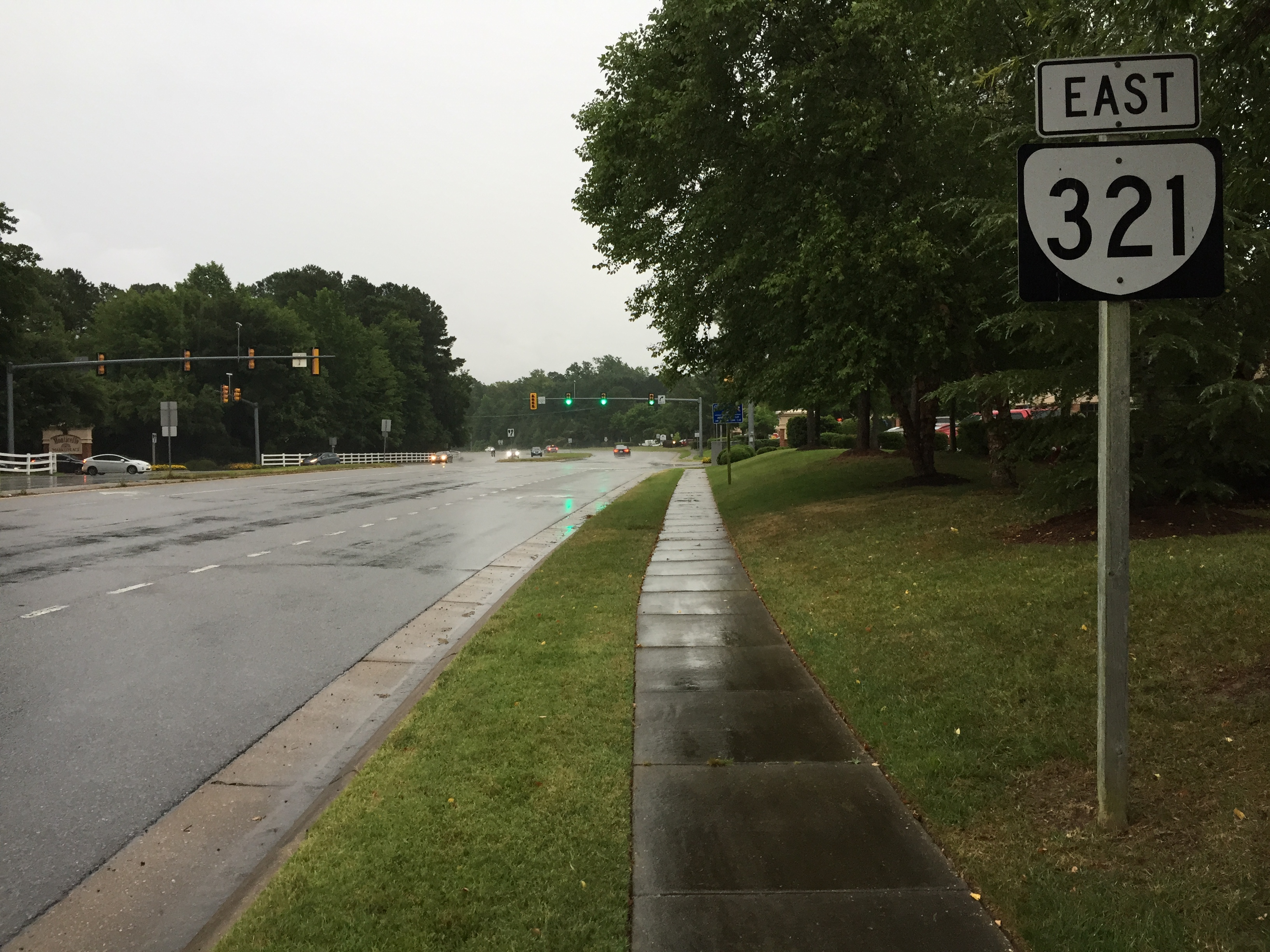
View east at the west end of SR 321 at News Road in James City County

State Route 321 is the designation for Monticello Avenue, the access road to The College of William & Mary in James City County and the City of Williamsburg. It extends from SR 199 to the college.

== SR 322 ==
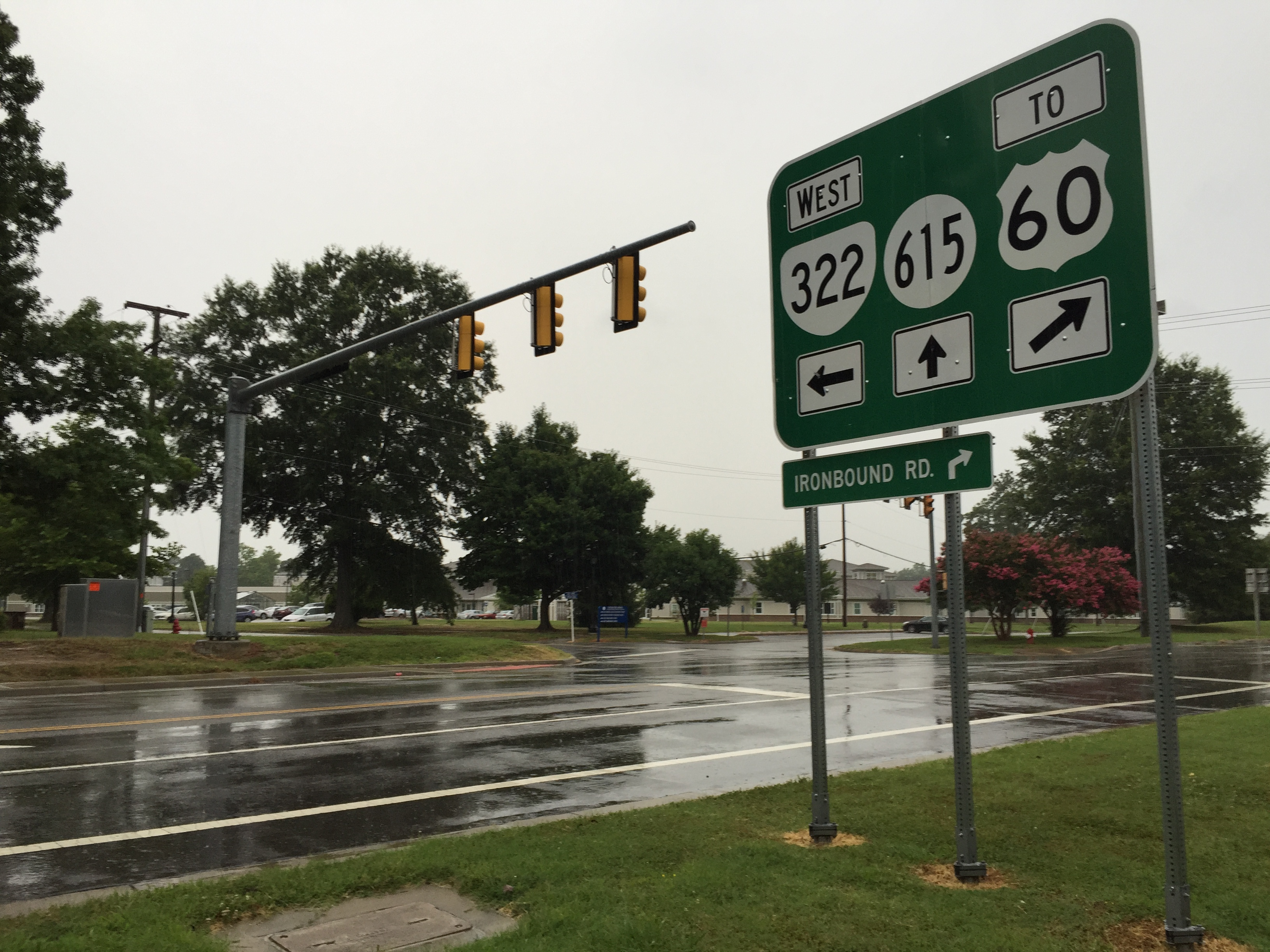
East end of SR 322 at SR 615 at the Eastern State Hospital northwest of Williamsburg

State Route 322 is the designation for roads on the grounds of Eastern State Hospital in James City County. It extends from SR 612 to SR 615.

== SR 323 ==
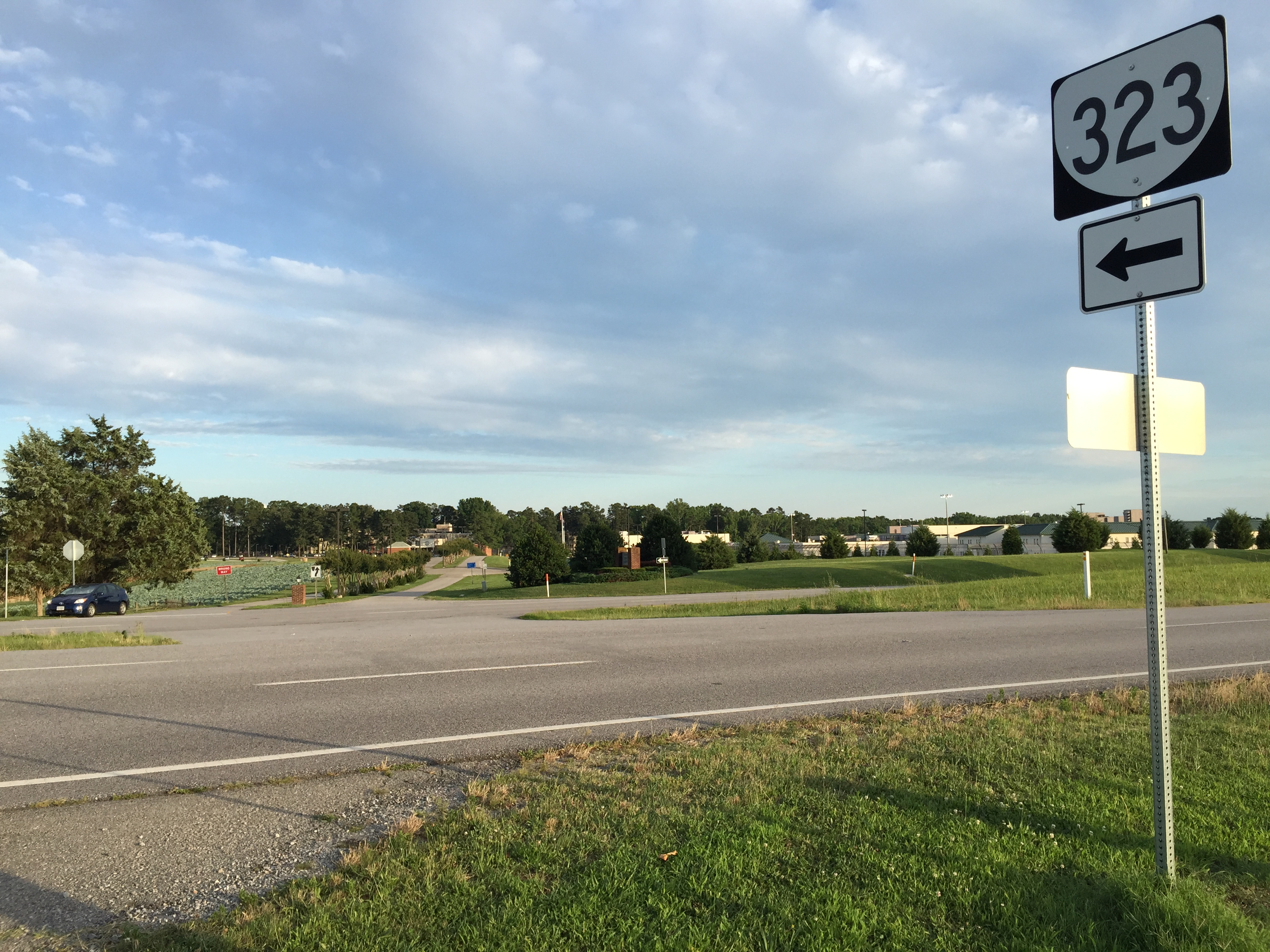
The north end of SR 323 at US 360 northeast of Burkeville

State Route 323 is the designation for roads on the grounds of the Piedmont Geriatric Hospital, which was built on the grounds of the old Piedmont Sanatorium in Nottoway County. It extends from US 360 to US 460.

== SR 324 ==
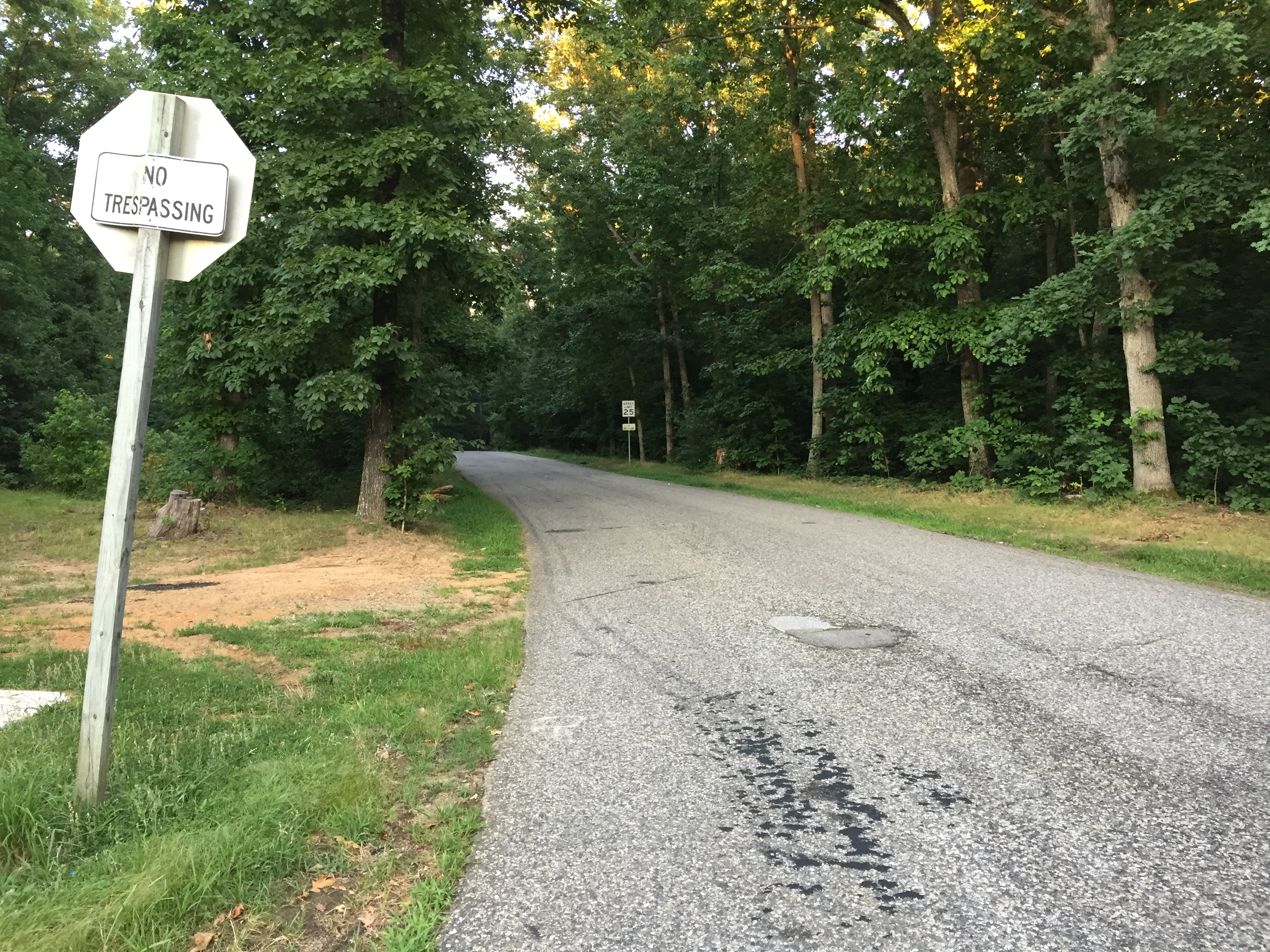
West end of SR 324 at SR 718 in Bon Air

State Route 324 is the designation for the ingress and egress roads to the Bon Air Learning Center, which was built on the grounds of the old Virginia Home and Industrial School for Girls in Chesterfield County. It extends from SR 718 through the learning center and back to SR 718.

== SR 325 ==
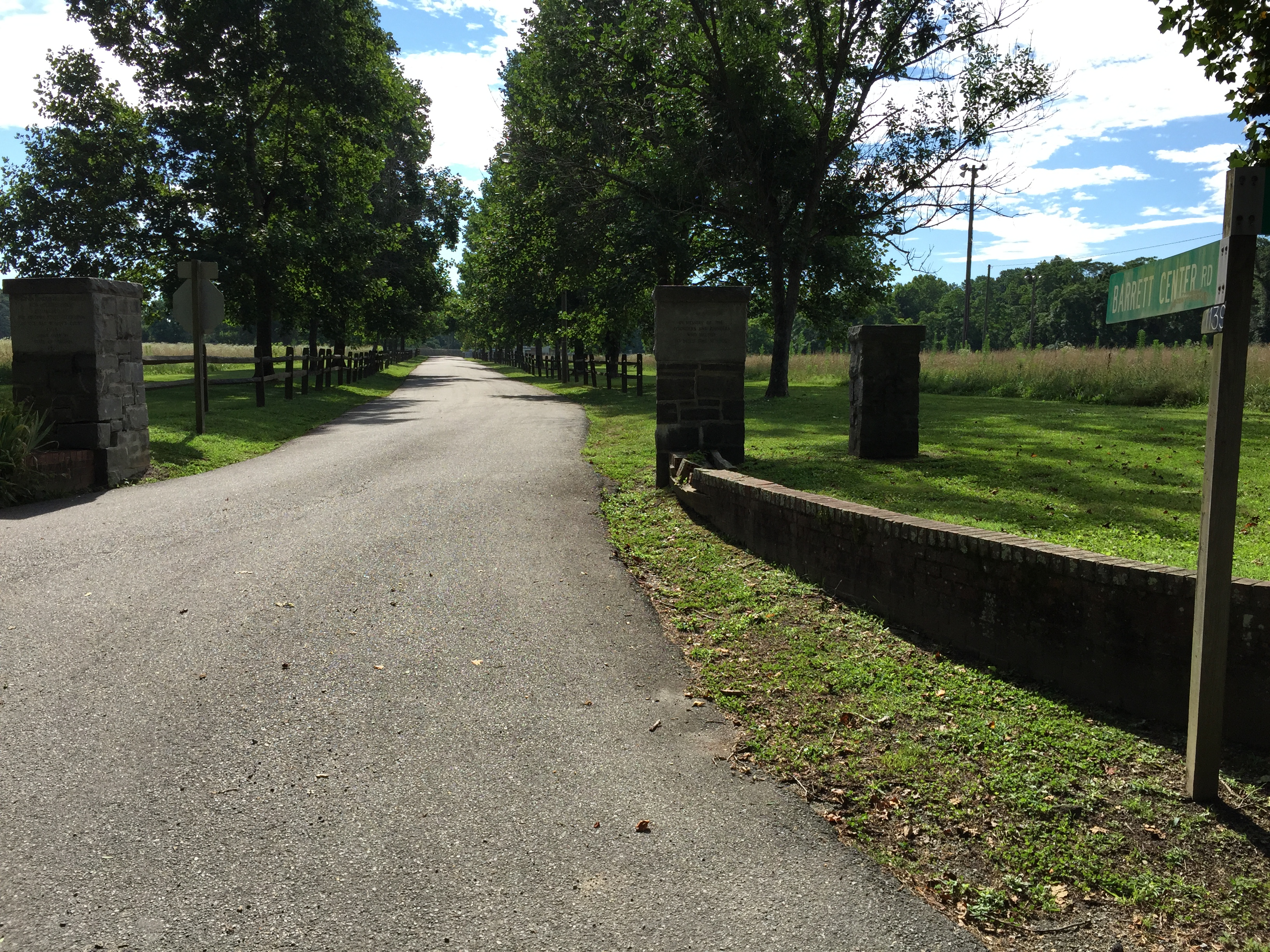
SR 325, the access road to Barrett Learning Center, at SR 651 in Hanover County

State Route 325 is the designation for the access road to the Barrett Learning Center, which was built on the grounds of the old Virginia Industrial School for Colored Girls in Hanover County. It extends from SR 651 to the learning center.

== SR 326 ==
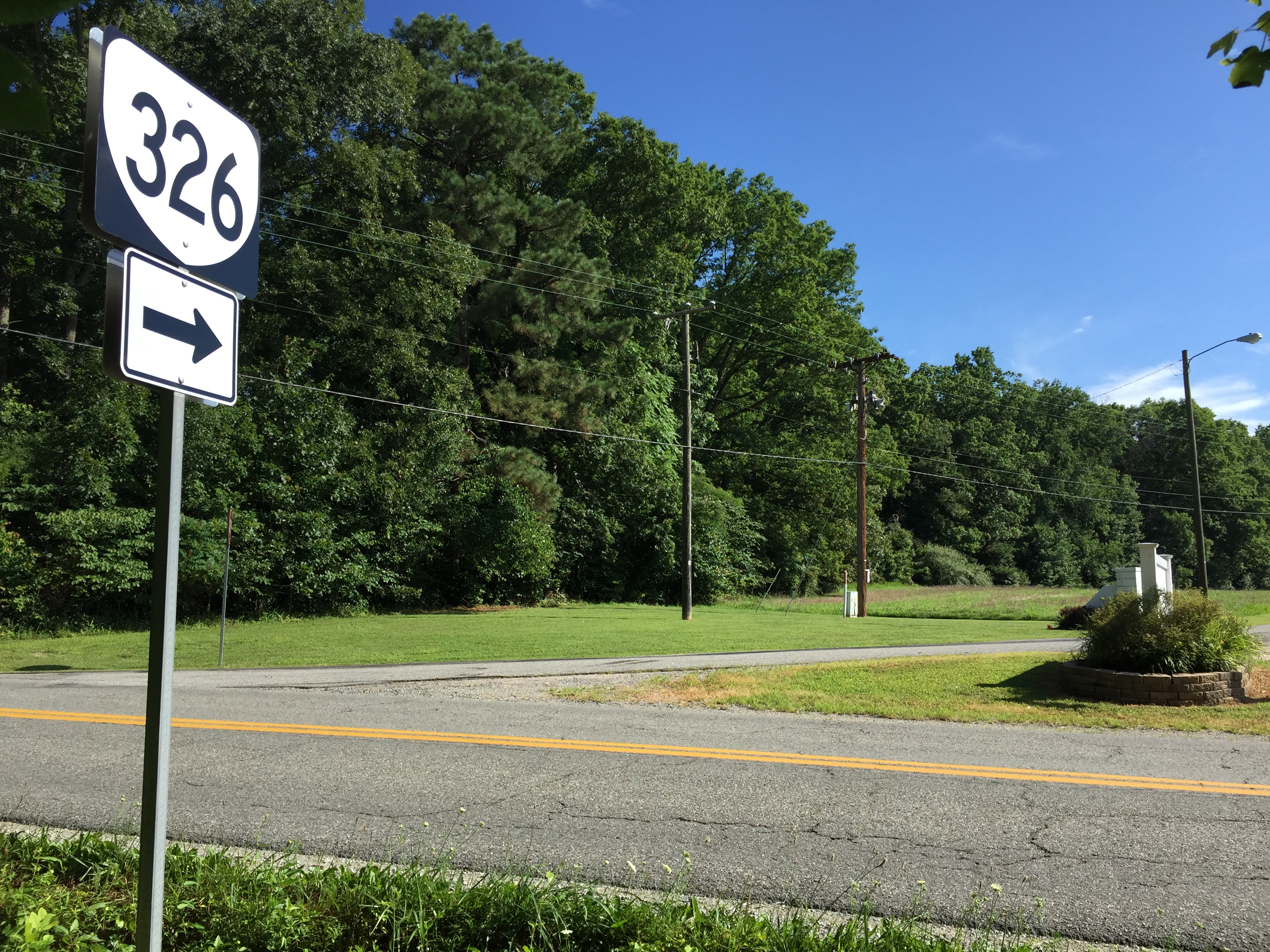
View east at the west end of SR 326 at SR 605 in Hanover County

State Route 326 is the designation for Broad Neck Road to the Commonwealth of Virginia Public Safety Training Center, which was built on the grounds of the old Virginia Manual Labor School in Hanover County. It extends from SR 605 to the learning center.

== SR 327 ==
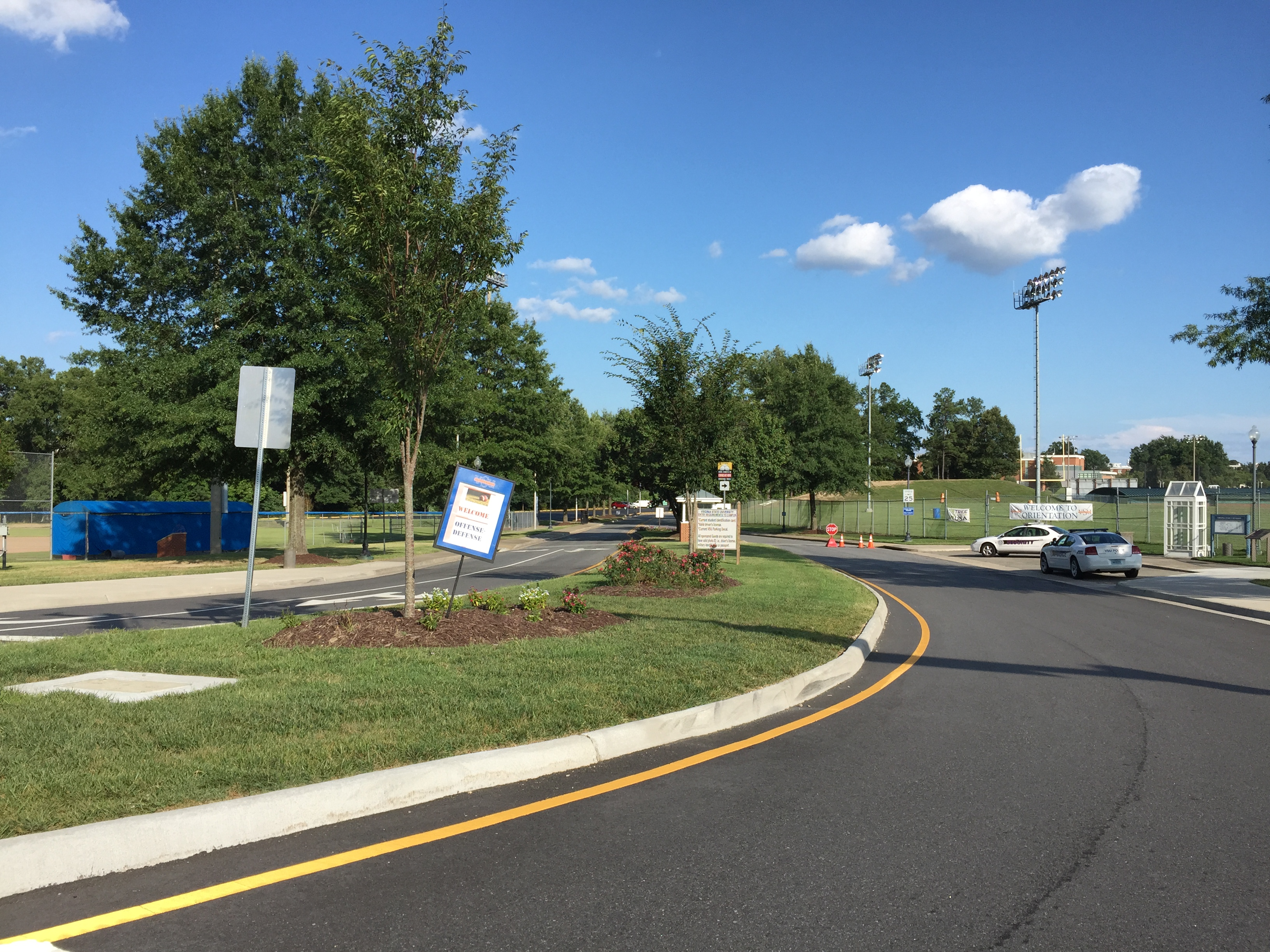
SR 327, the access road to Virginia State University, at SR 1107 in Ettrick

State Route 327 is the designation for the access roads to the Virginia State University, Petersburg in Chesterfield County, which was renamed from the Virginia State College for Negroes. The road endpoints are at SR 36, SR 1102, and SR 1107.

== SR 328 ==
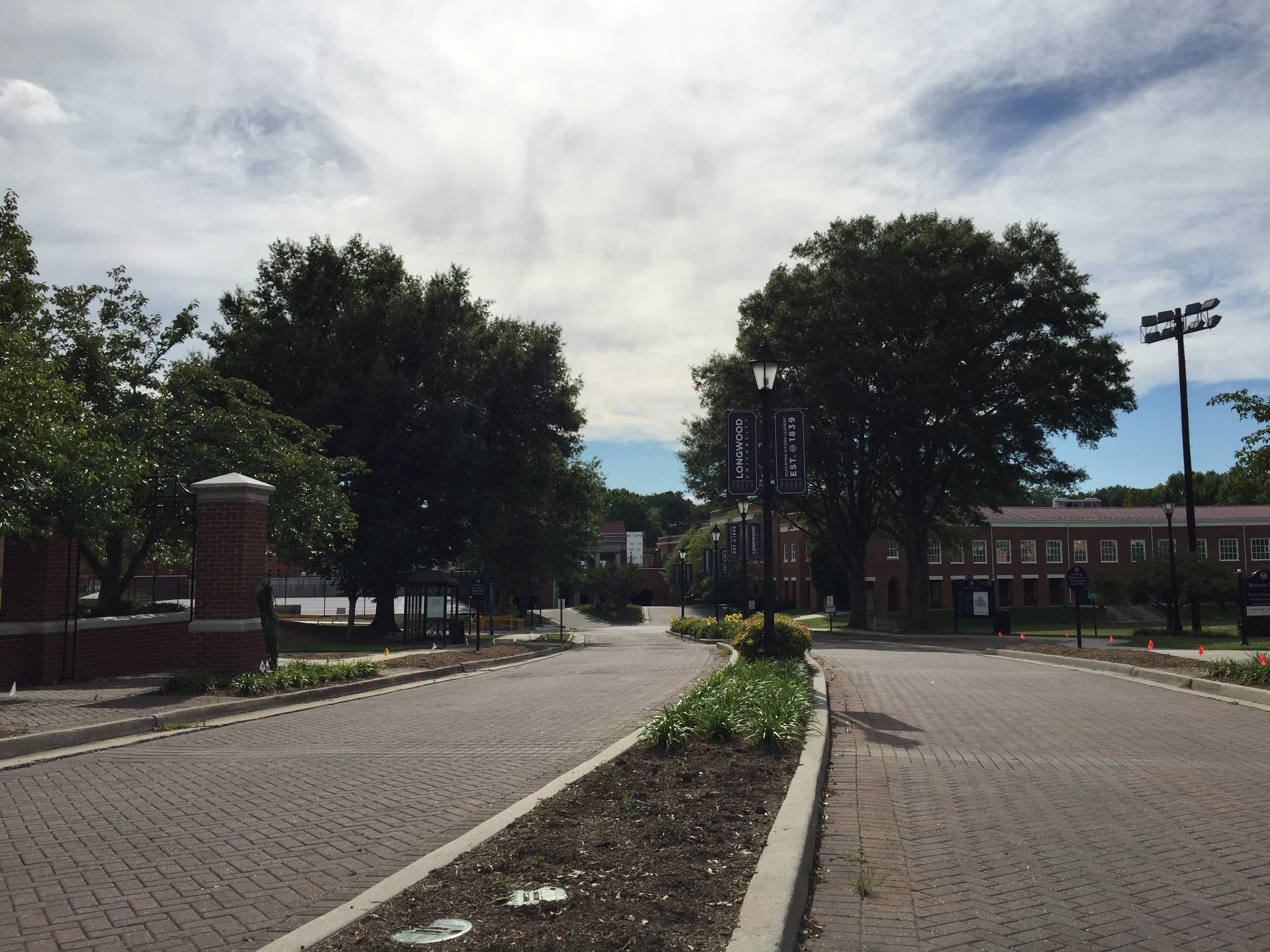
SR 328 at US 15 Bus. at Longwood University in Farmville

State Route 328 is the designation for roads within Longwood University in Farmville, Prince Edward County. These roads were first made part of the primary road system in 1958.

== SR 328 (former) ==
State Route 328 was the designation for roads within the Virginia School for Colored Deaf and Blind Children in the City of Newport News. These roads were first made part of the primary road system in 1932, and were decommissioned in 1939.

== SR 329 ==
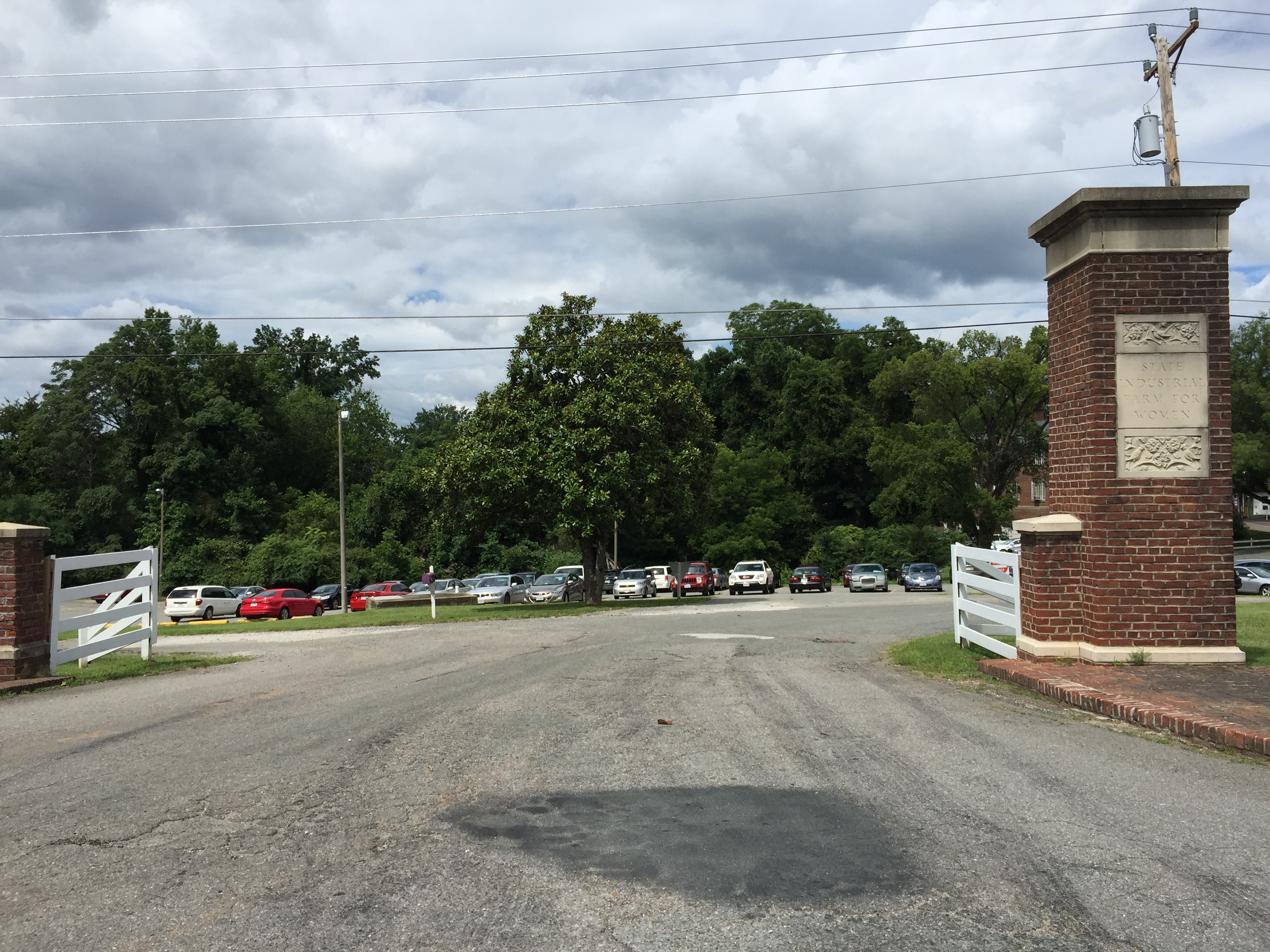
The east end of SR 329 at US 522/SR 6 at the Virginia Correctional Center for Women in Goochland County

State Route 329 is the designation for roads within the Virginia Correctional Center for Women in Goochland County. These roads were first made part of the primary road system in 1932.

== SR 330 ==
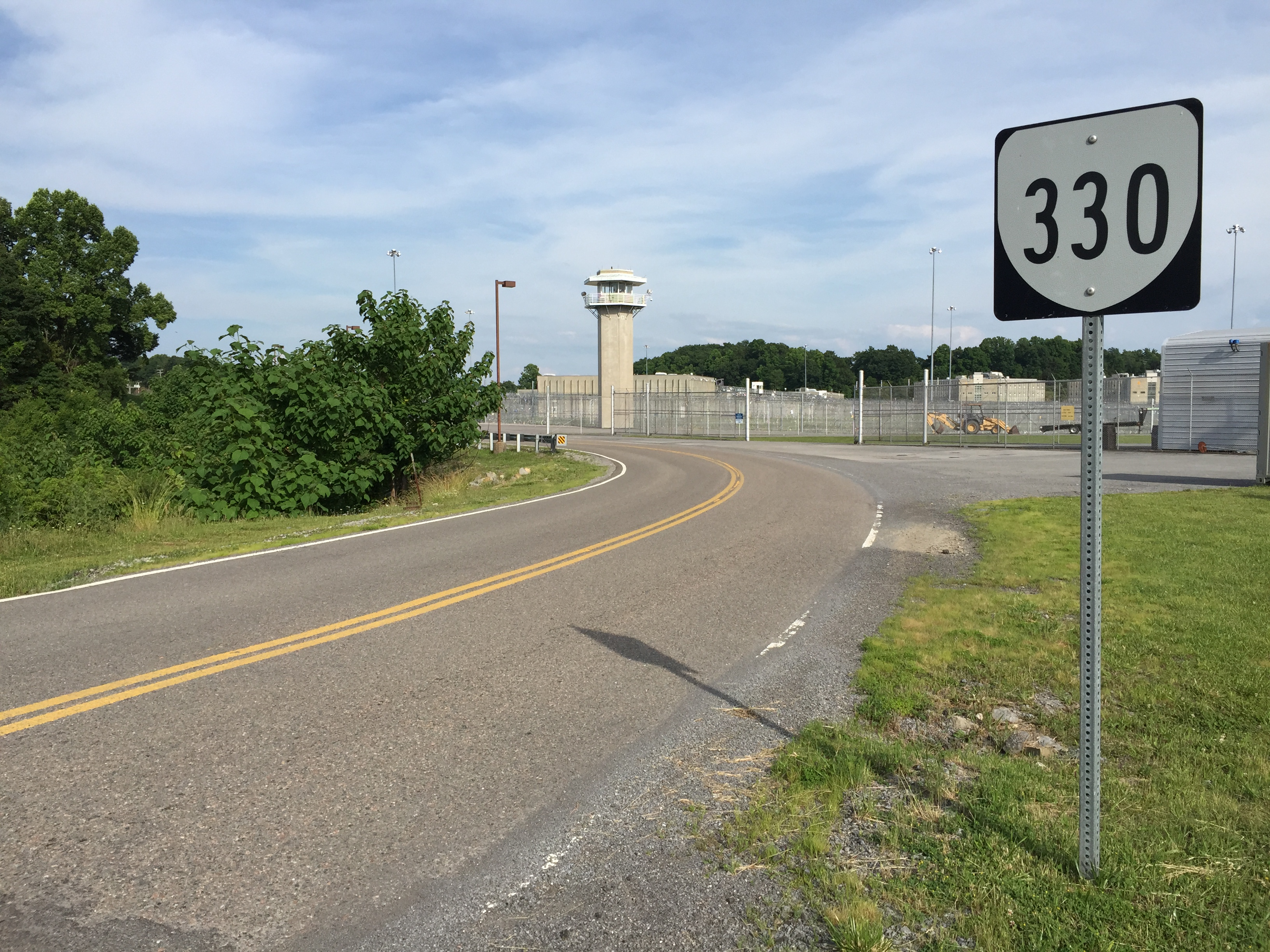
View east along SR 330 at the Keen Mountain Correctional Center in Buchanan County

State Route 330 is the designation for roads within the Keen Mountain Correctional Center in Buchanan County. These roads were first made part of the primary road system in the 1990s when the facility opened. The outside terminus is at SR 624.

== SR 330 (former) ==
State Route 330 was the designation for the roads within Mary Washington College, now known as the University of Mary Washington, in the City of Fredericksburg. The roads were first designated in 1938, and were decommissioned in 1980, long before the school was redesignated as a "University".

== SR 331 ==
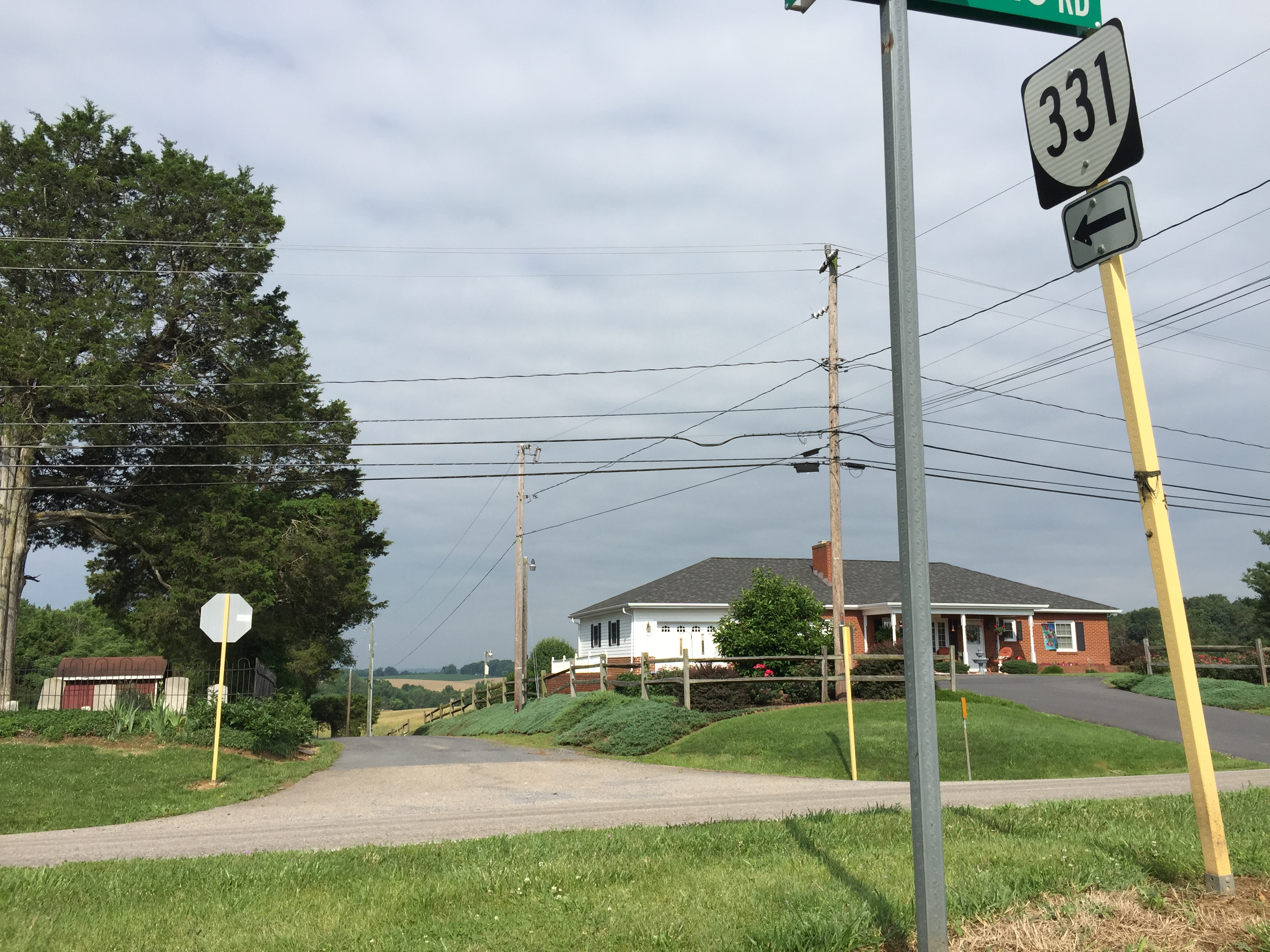
SR 331 at SR 253 near Port Republic

State Route 331 is the designation for roads within James Madison University, including University Boulevard, Port Republic Road and Bluestone Drive, in the City of Harrisonburg, as well as Alumnae Drive near Port Republic in Rockingham County. The school was, in 1932, the Virginia Teachers College in Harrisonburg, and received a primary road allocation in 1932. The outside termini for the section in Harrisonburg are at US 11 and US 33, while the section near Port Republic ends at SR 253.

== SR 332 ==
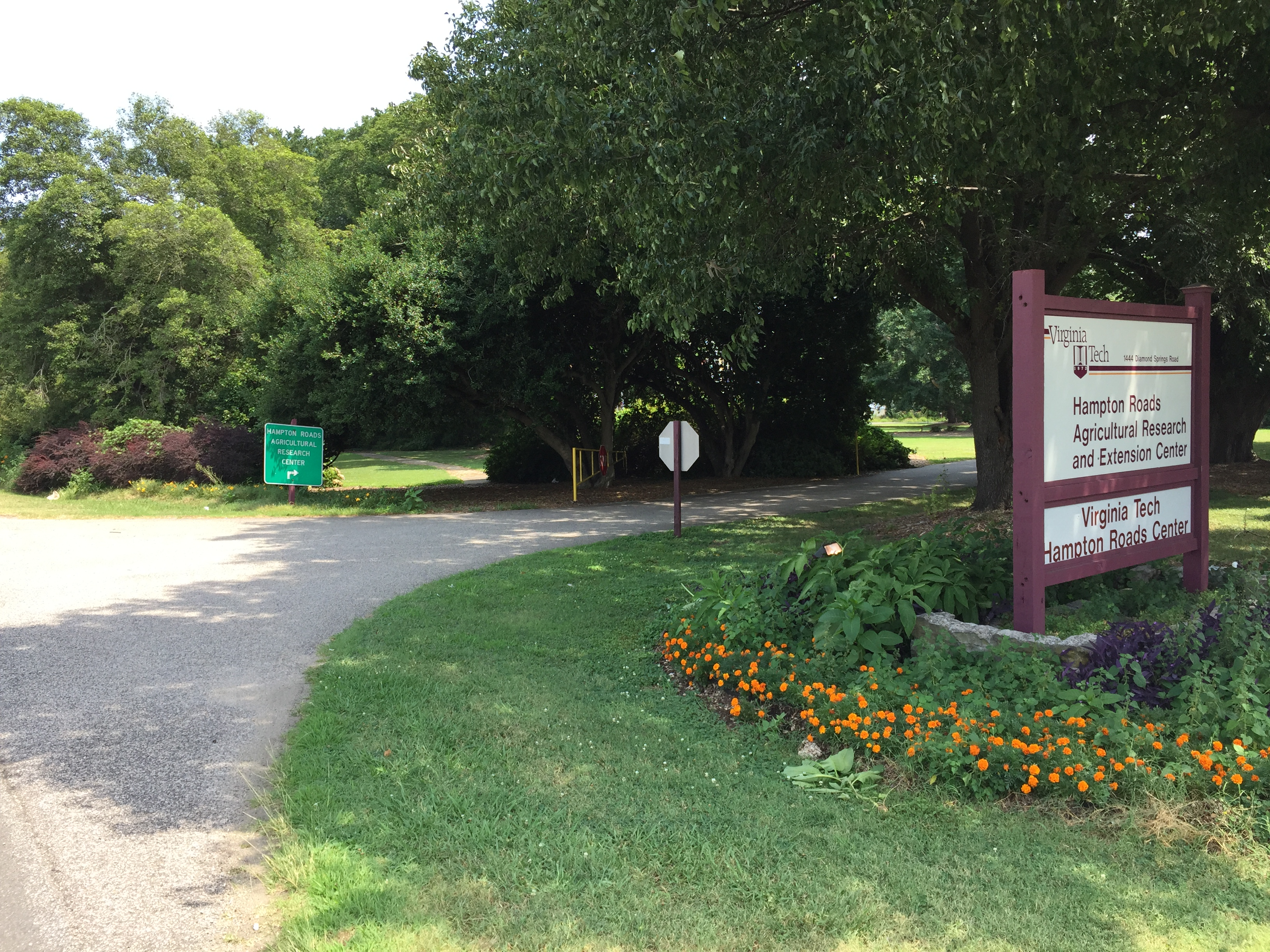
SR 332, the entrance from SR 166 to the Virginia Beach Agricultural Station in Virginia Beach

State Route 332 is the designation for the entrance into the Virginia Beach Agricultural Station, formerly known as the Virginia Truck Experimental Station, Virginia Beach, in the City of Virginia Beach. The station received a primary road allocation in 1932. The outside terminus is at SR 166.

== SR 333 ==
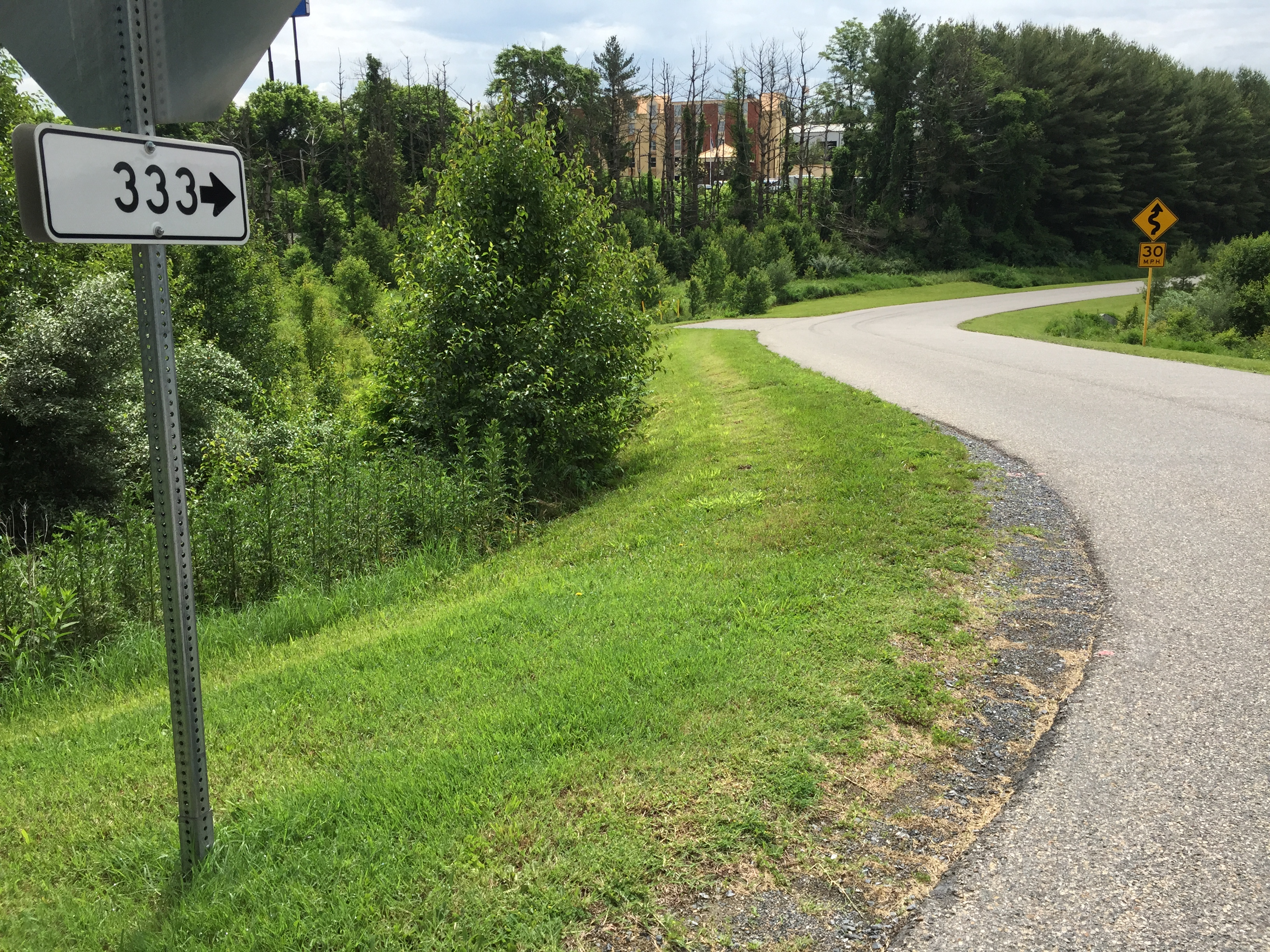
View south from the north end of SR 333 at George M. Cochran Parkway in Staunton

State Route 333 is the designation for Augusta Woods Drive, which travels south from George M Cochran Parkway in Staunton, under Interstate 81, and comes to a dead end in Augusta County.

== SR 334 (former) ==
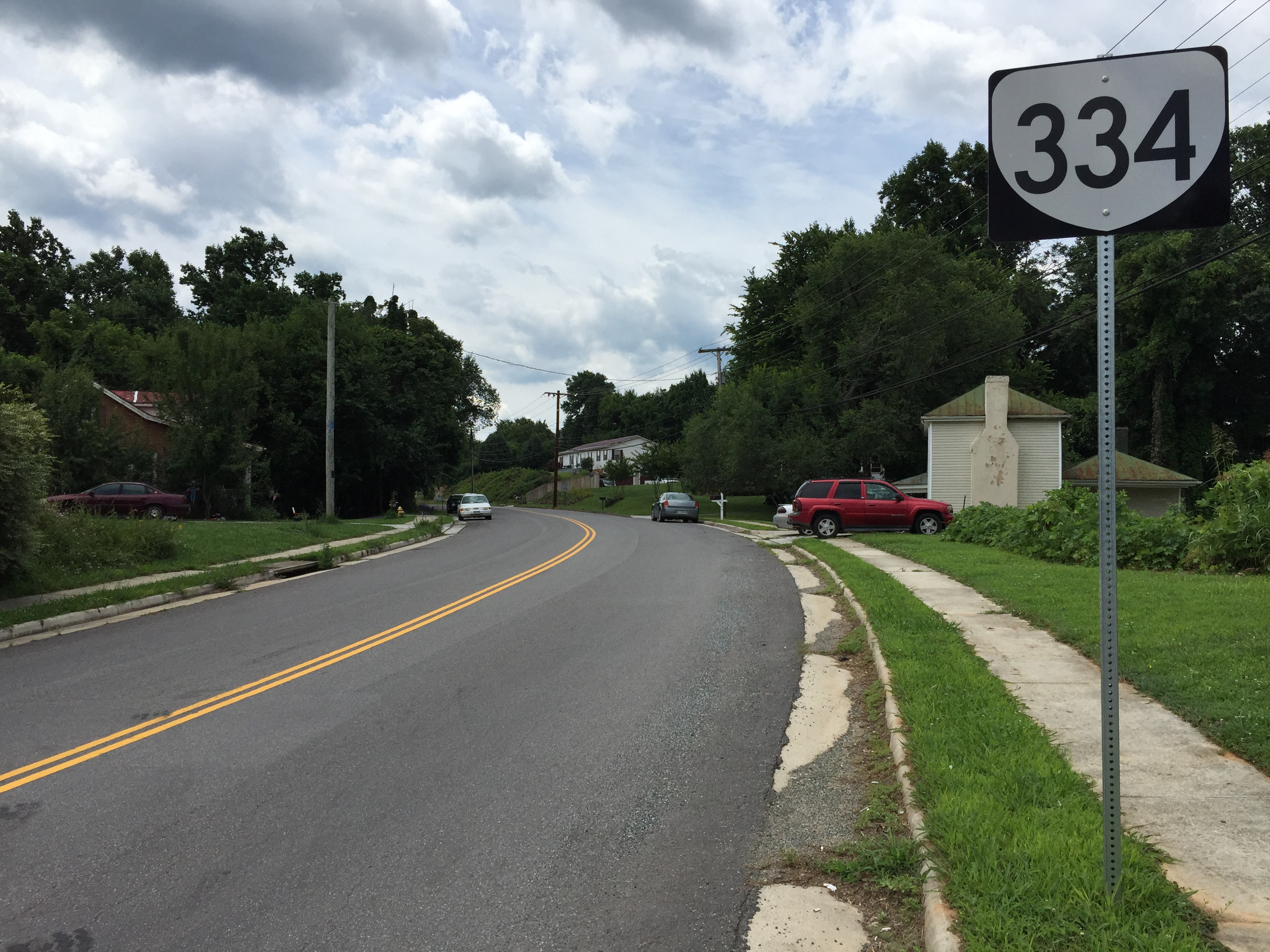
View south along SR 334 in the Central Virginia Training Center in Amherst County

State Route 334 was the designation for roads on the grounds of the Central Virginia Training Center in Amherst County that are maintained by the Virginia Department of Transportation. This institution is on the site of the Virginia State Colony for Epileptics and Feebleminded (see also Carrie Buck) near Lynchburg. The roads were added to the state highway system in 1932, and the number was in use by 1938. The Virginia State Colony for Epileptics and Feebleminded (now one of five sites of the Central Virginia Training Center) was closed in 2020, and VA 334 was decommissioned.

== SR 335 ==
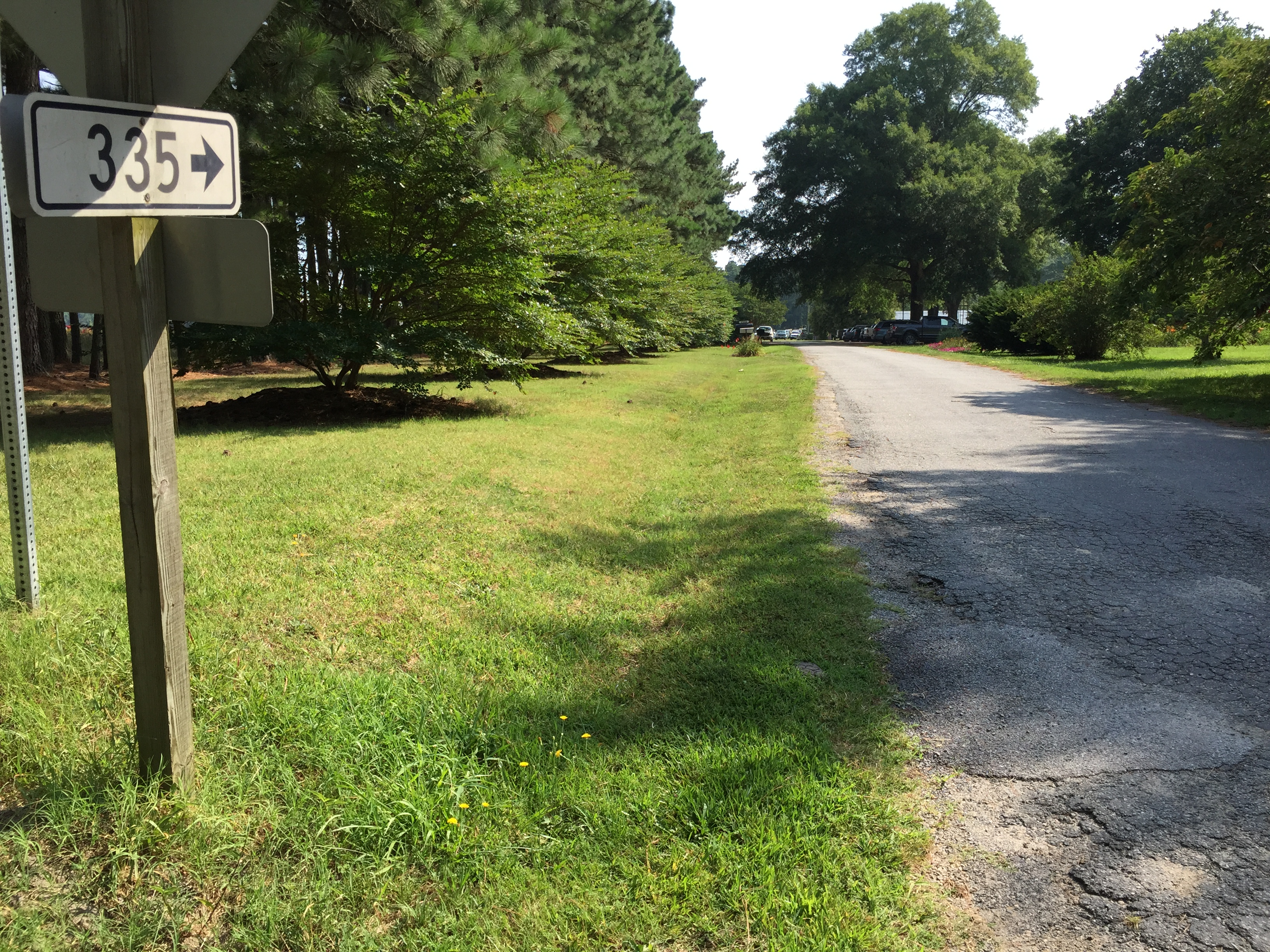
West end of SR 335 at SR 614 at the Eastern Shore Experimental Station in Painter

State Route 335 is the designation for the entrance into the Eastern Shore Experimental Station, formerly known as the Virginia Tech Experimental Station, Painter, Virginia in Accomack County, that is maintained by the Virginia Department of Transportation. The road forms a loop off of SR 614. It was added to the state highway system in 1959.

== SR 336 ==
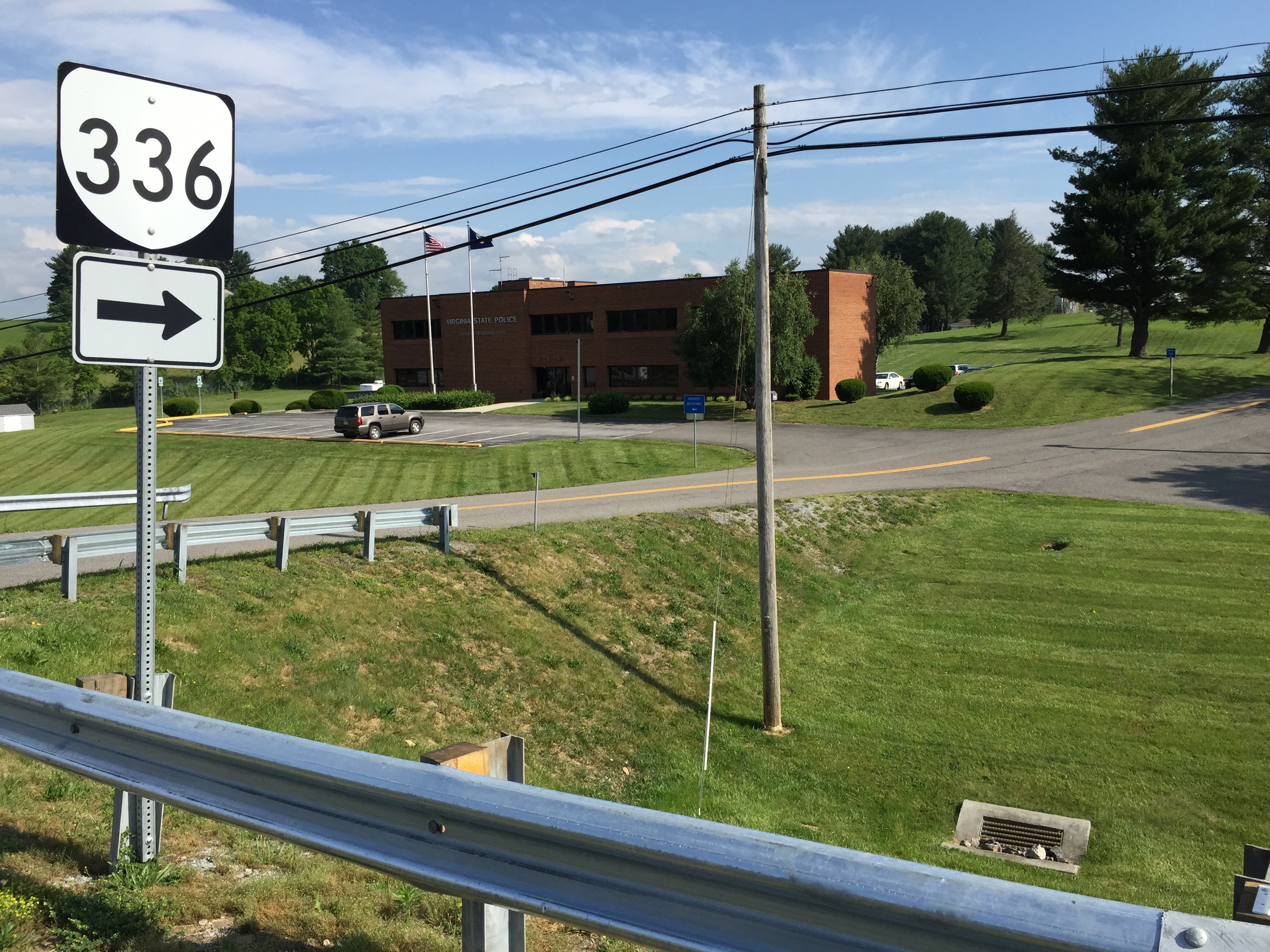
SR 336, a spur off of SR F-043 to the State Police, Fourth Division Headquarters in Wythe County

State Route 336 is the designation for roads on the grounds of the State Police, Fourth Division Headquarters in Wythe County that are maintained by the Virginia Department of Transportation. These roads form a spur off of SR F-043. They were added to the state highway system in 1960.

== SR 339 ==
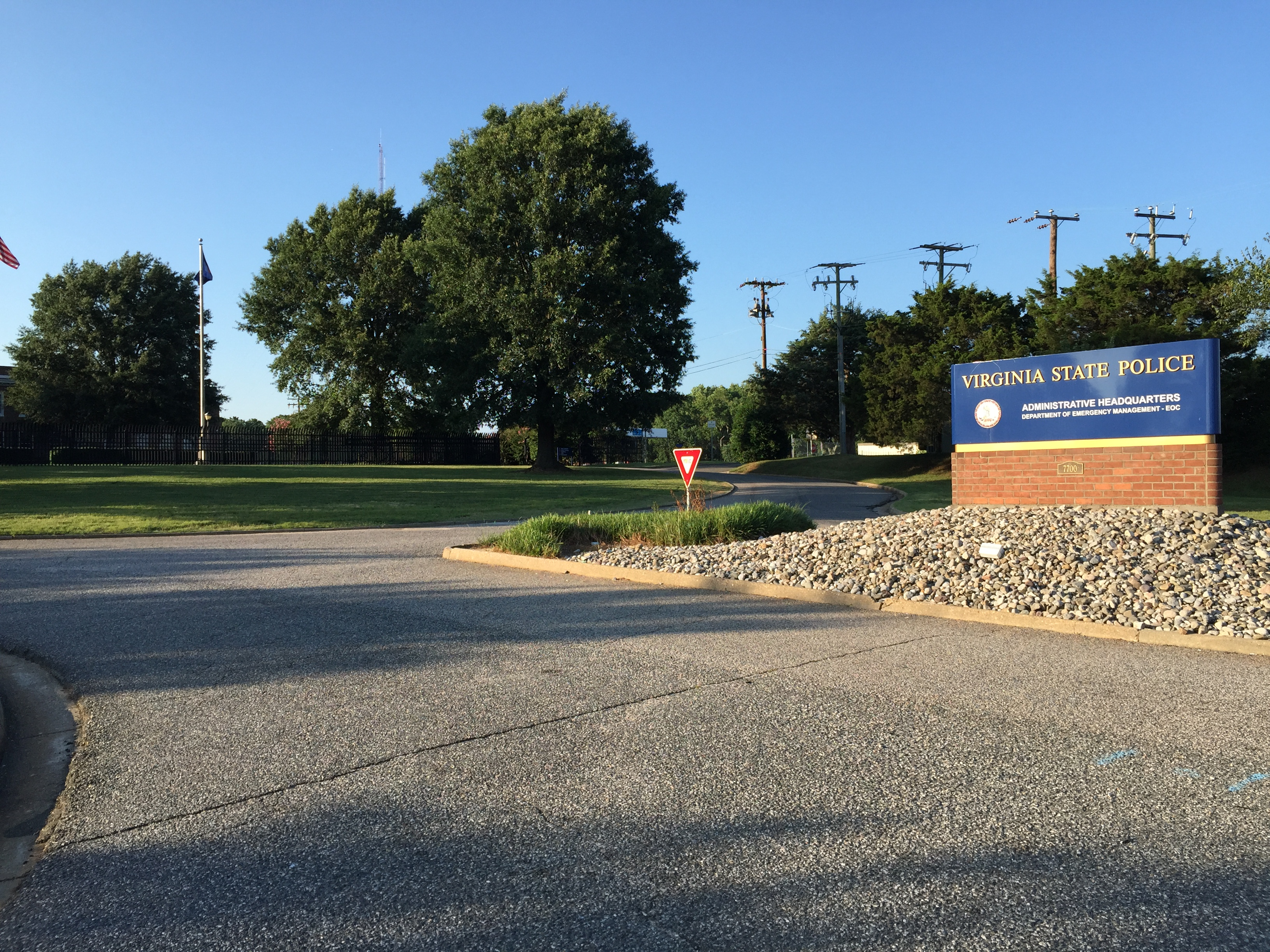
SR 339, the entrance from US 60 to the State Police Headquarters in Chesterfield County

State Route 339 is the designation for the entrance into the State Police Headquarters of Chesterfield County that are maintained by the Virginia Department of Transportation. This road was added to the state highway system in 1939. The outside terminus is US 60.

== SR 341 ==
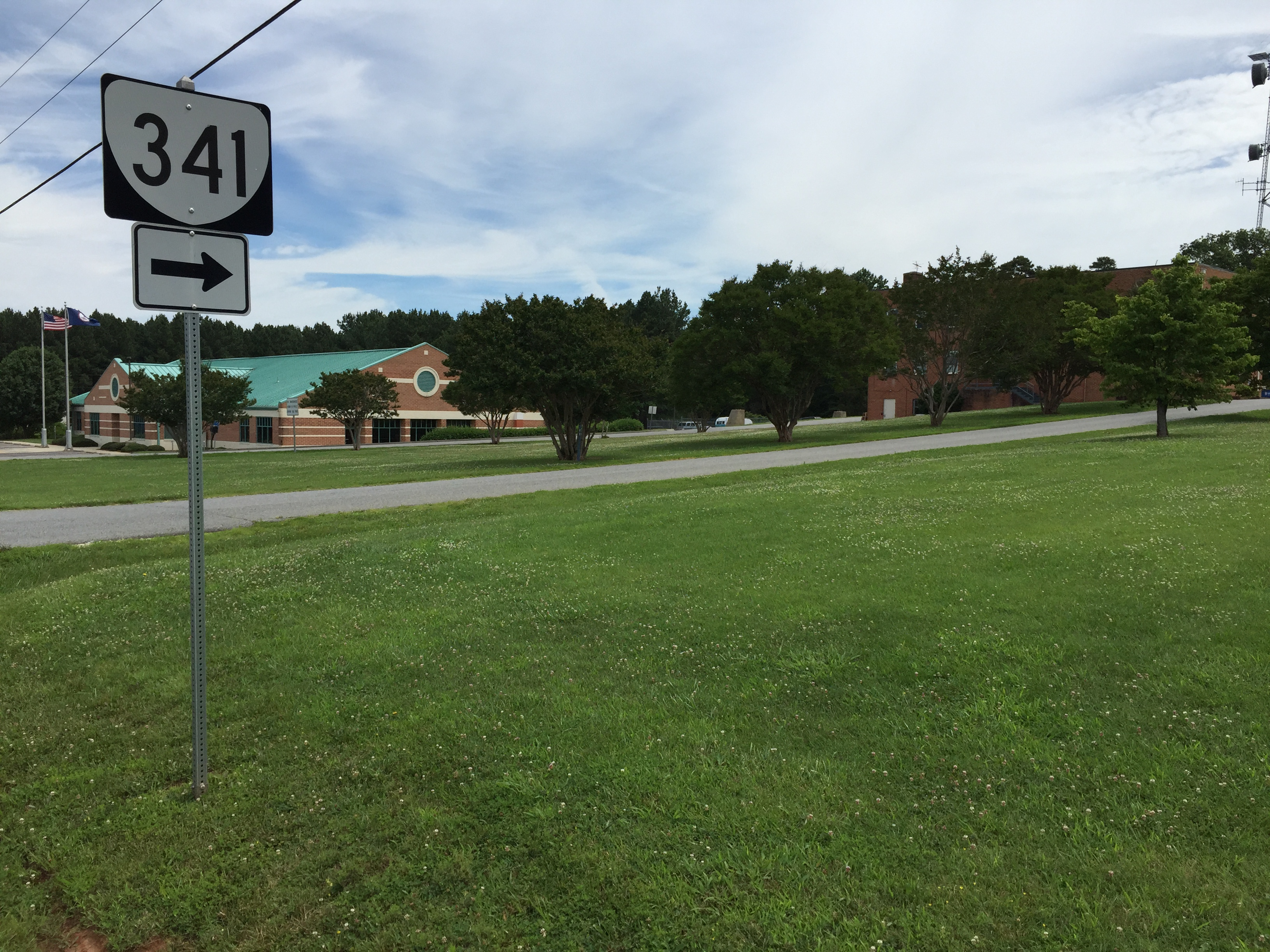
SR 341, the entrance from SR 613 to the State Police Headquarters in Appomattox County

State Route 341 is the designation for the entrances into the State Police Headquarters of Appomattox County that are maintained by the Virginia Department of Transportation. These roads were added to the state highway system in 1940. The outside terminus is SR 613.

== SR 342 ==
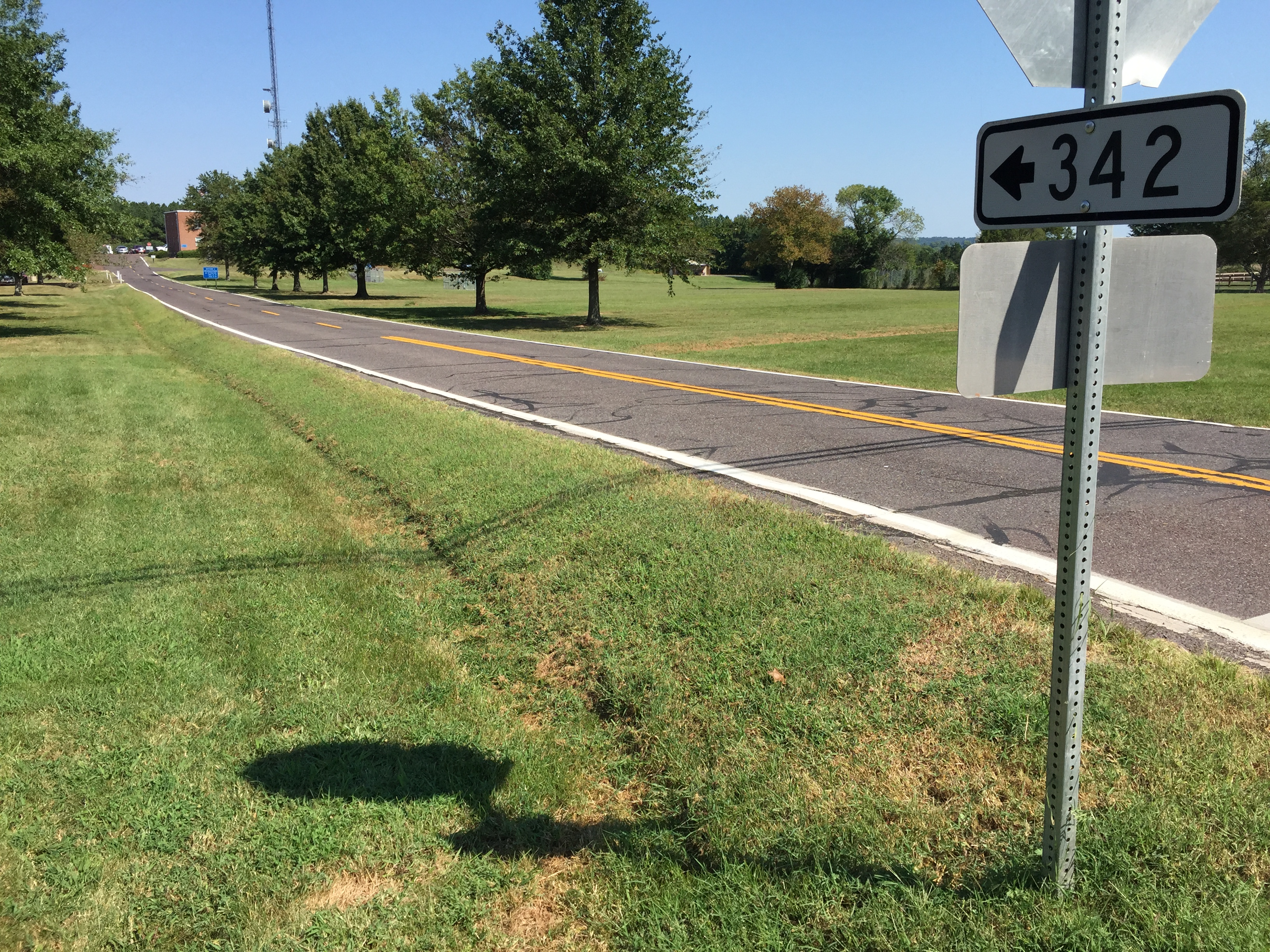
View north along SR 342 at SR 762 in Culpeper County

State Route 342 is the designation for the entrance into the State Police Headquarters of Culpeper County that is maintained by the Virginia Department of Transportation. This road was added to the state highway system in 1940. The outside terminus is SR 762.

== SR 343 ==
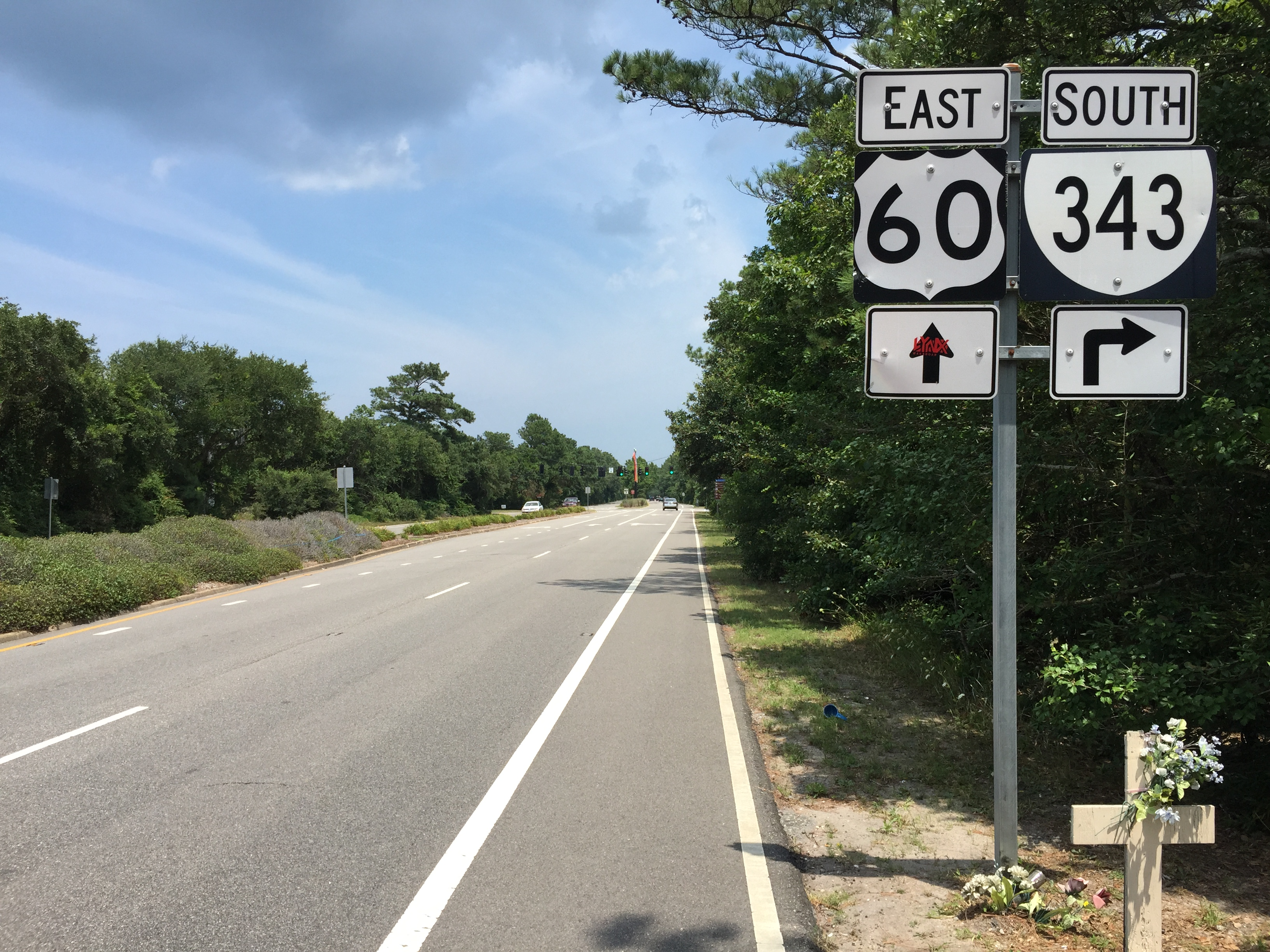
View east along US 60 at SR 343 in First Landing State Park in Virginia Beach

State Route 343 is the designation for the entrances into First Landing State Park in the City of Virginia Beach that are maintained by the Virginia Department of Transportation. These roads were added to the state highway system in 1940. The outside termini are US 60 and 64th Street.

== SR 344 ==
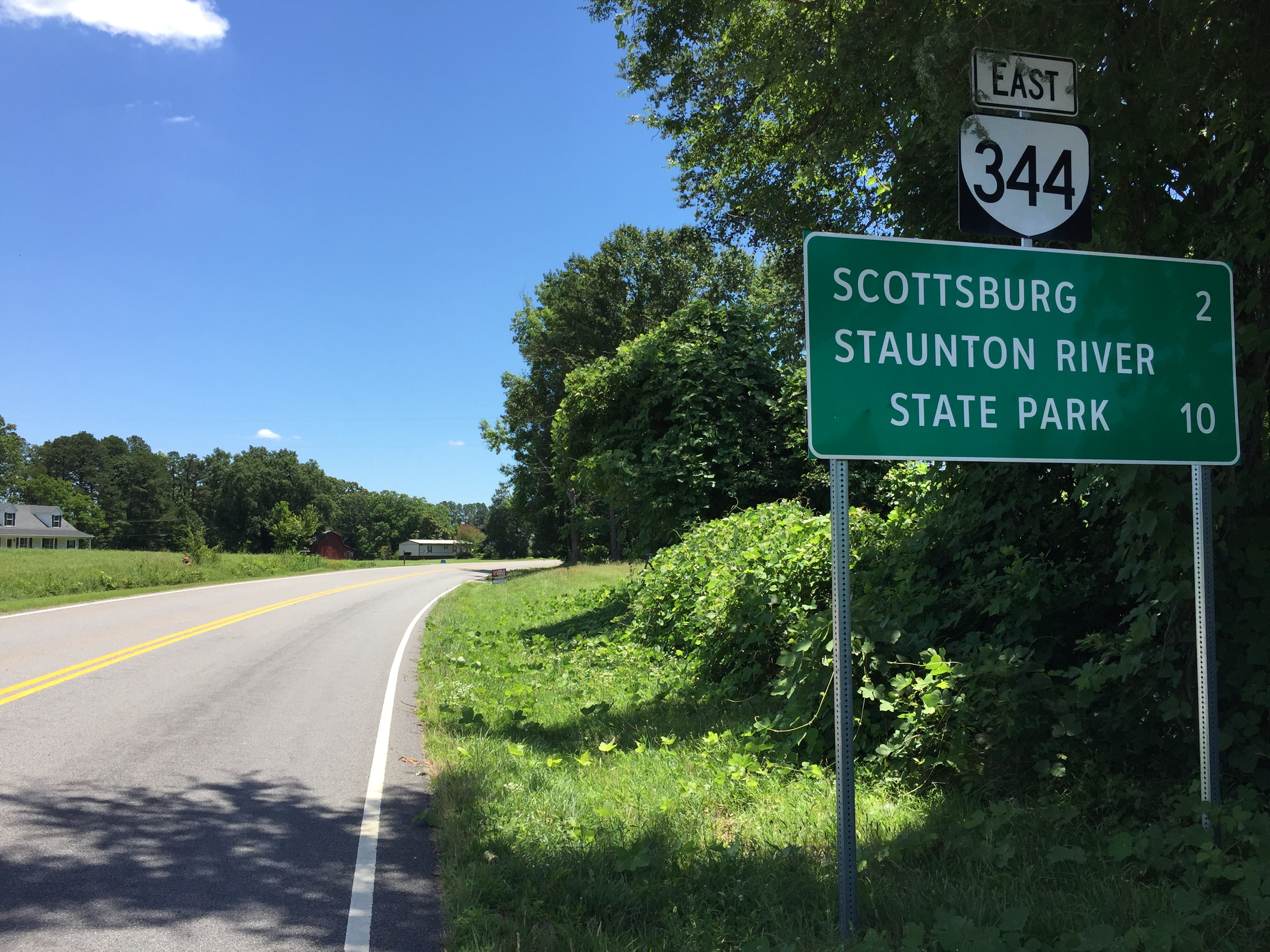
View east near the west end of SR 344 at US 360 and SR 360 in Halifax County

State Route 344 is the designation for the entrance into Staunton River State Park in Halifax County, along with the road to US 360/SR 360 (Scottsburg Road, McDonald Road) that is maintained by the Virginia Department of Transportation. These roads were added to the state highway system in 1940.

== SR 345 ==
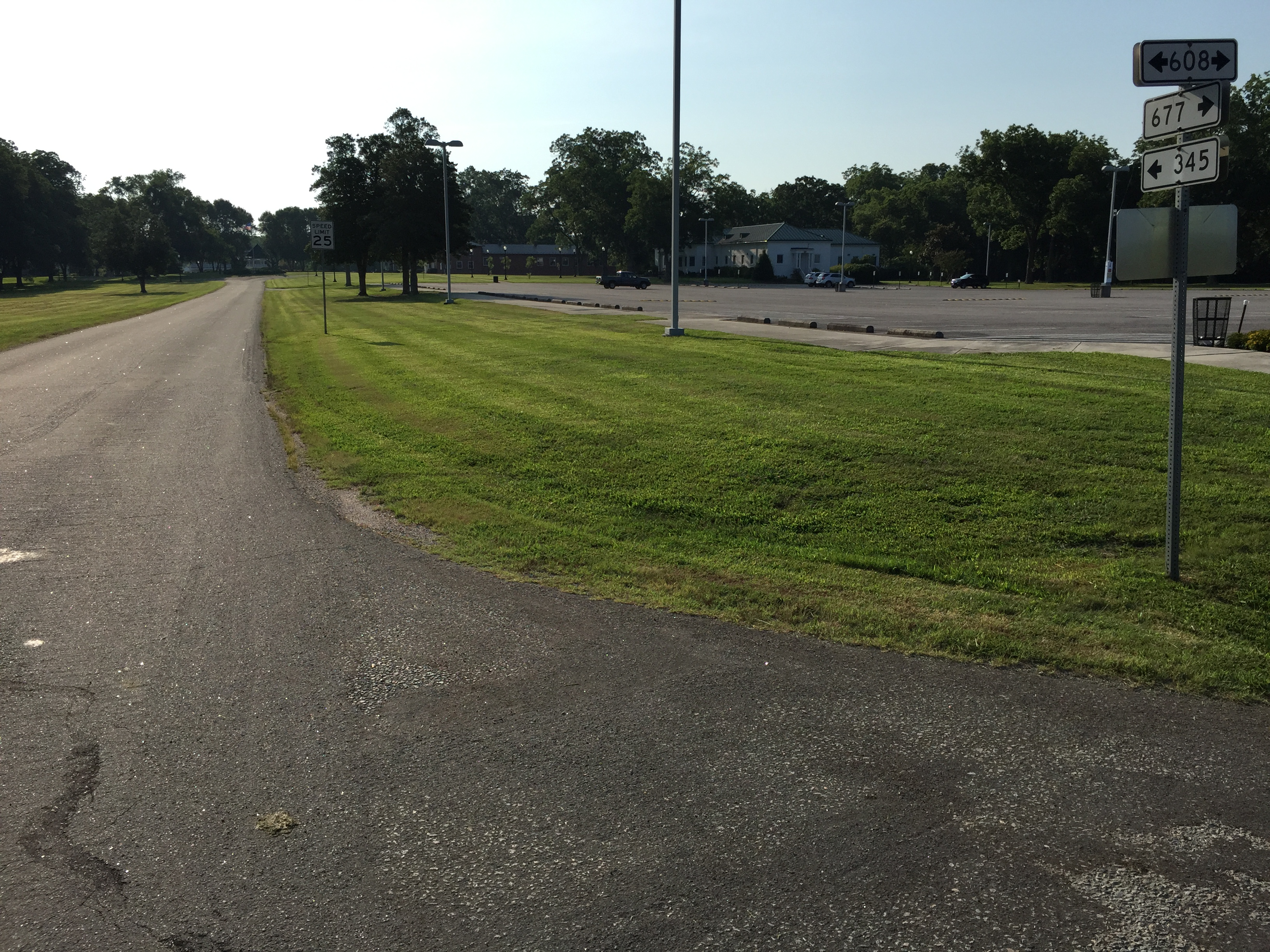
View east at the west end of SR 345 at SR 608 at Richard Bland College in Dinwiddie County

State Route 345 is the designation for the entrance into Richard Bland College in Dinwiddie County and Prince George County that is maintained by the Virginia Department of Transportation. This road was added to the state highway system in 1962. The outside termini are SR 608 and SR 677.

== SR 345 (former) ==
State Route 345 was the designation for a road within Douthat State Park in Bath County that was maintained by the Virginia Department of Transportation. This road was added to the state highway system in 1941, and was decommissioned in 1944.

== SR 346 ==
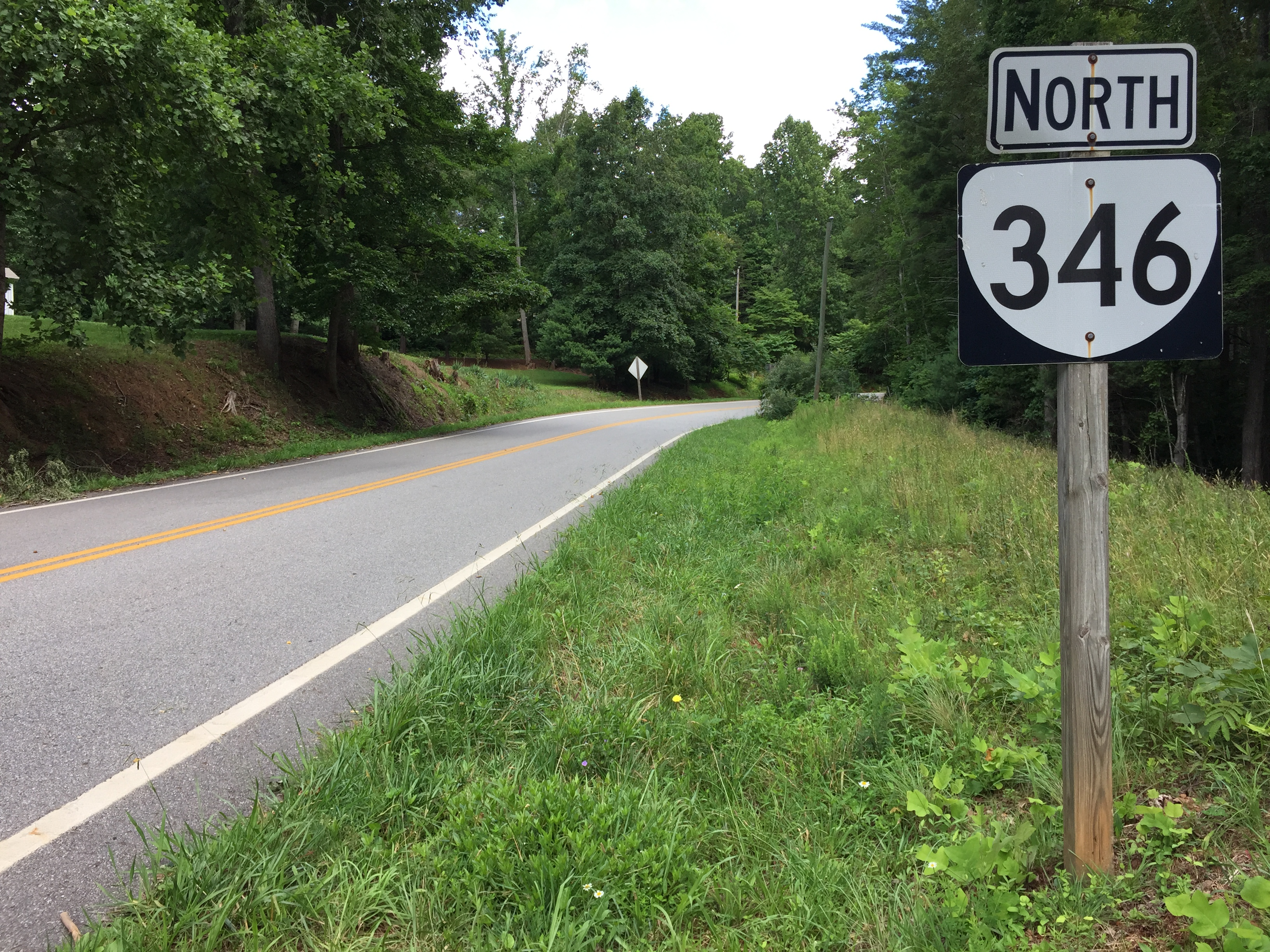
View north at the south end of SR 346 at SR 57 in Patrick County

State Route 346 is the designation for Fairystone Lake Drive within Fairy Stone State Park in Patrick County that is maintained by the Virginia Department of Transportation. The southern terminus for this road is SR 57. It was added to the state highway system in 1940.

== SR 347 ==
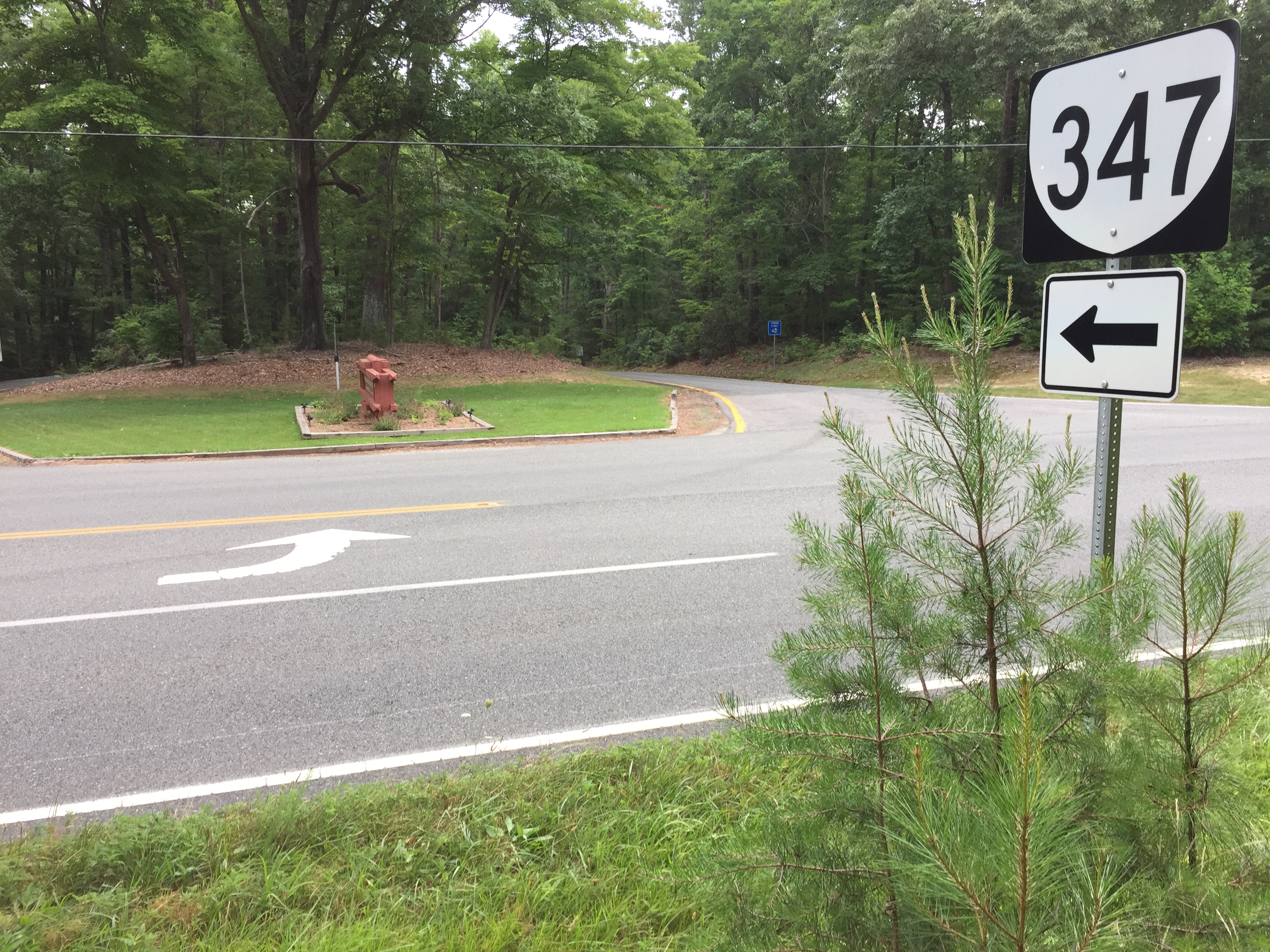
View north at the south end of SR 347 at SR 3 at the entrance to Westmoreland State Park in Westmoreland County

State Route 347 is the designation for Westmoreland State Park Road in Westmoreland State Park, Westmoreland County that is maintained by the Virginia Department of Transportation. The southern terminus for this road is SR 3. It was added to the state highway system in 1940.

== SR 348 ==
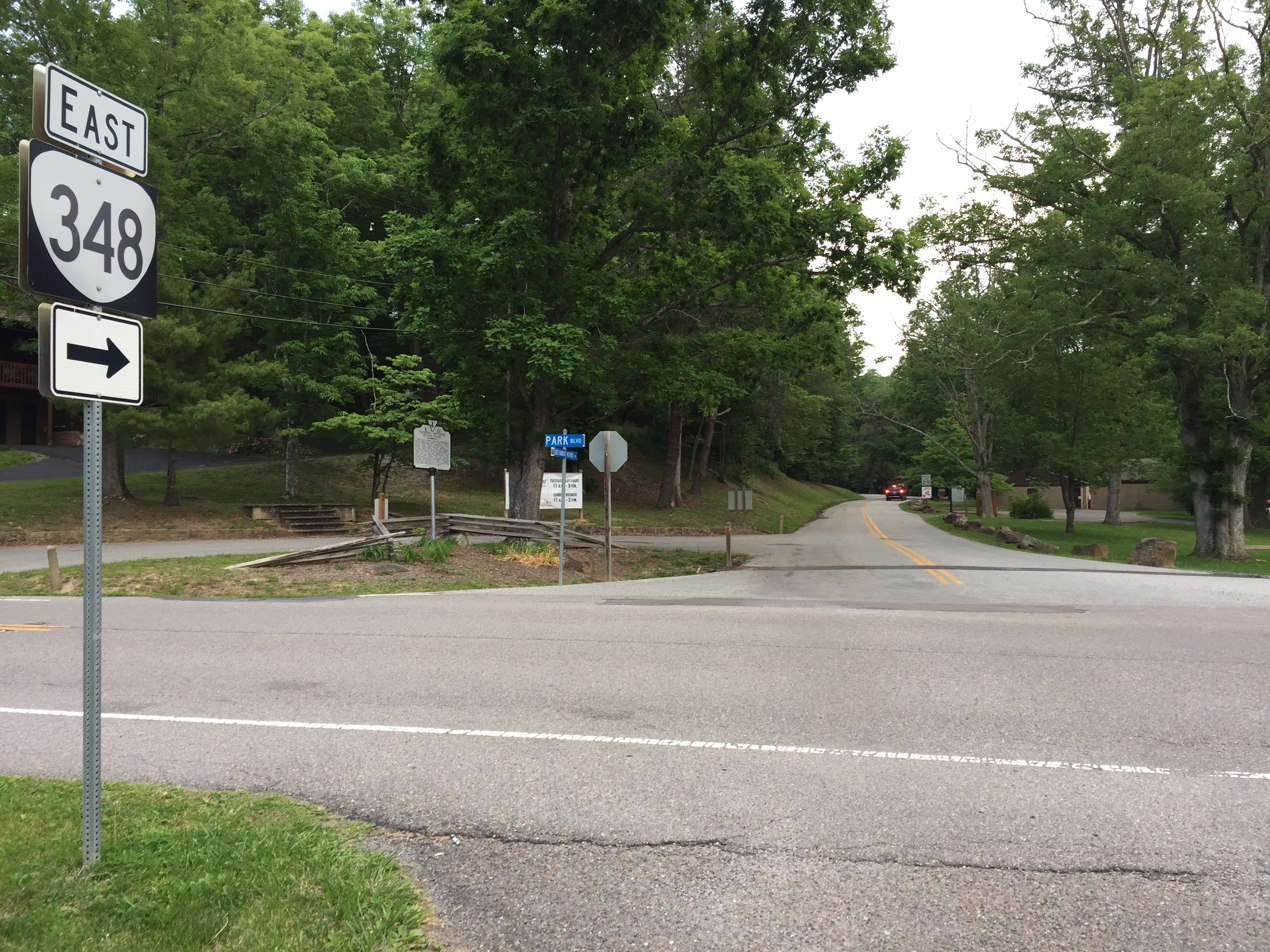
View east at the west end of SR 348 at SR 16 at Hungry Mother State Park in Smyth County

State Route 348 is the designation for Hungry Mother Drive in Hungry Mother State Park in Smyth County that is maintained by the Virginia Department of Transportation. The southern terminus for this road is SR 16. It was added to the state highway system in 1940.

== SR 350 ==
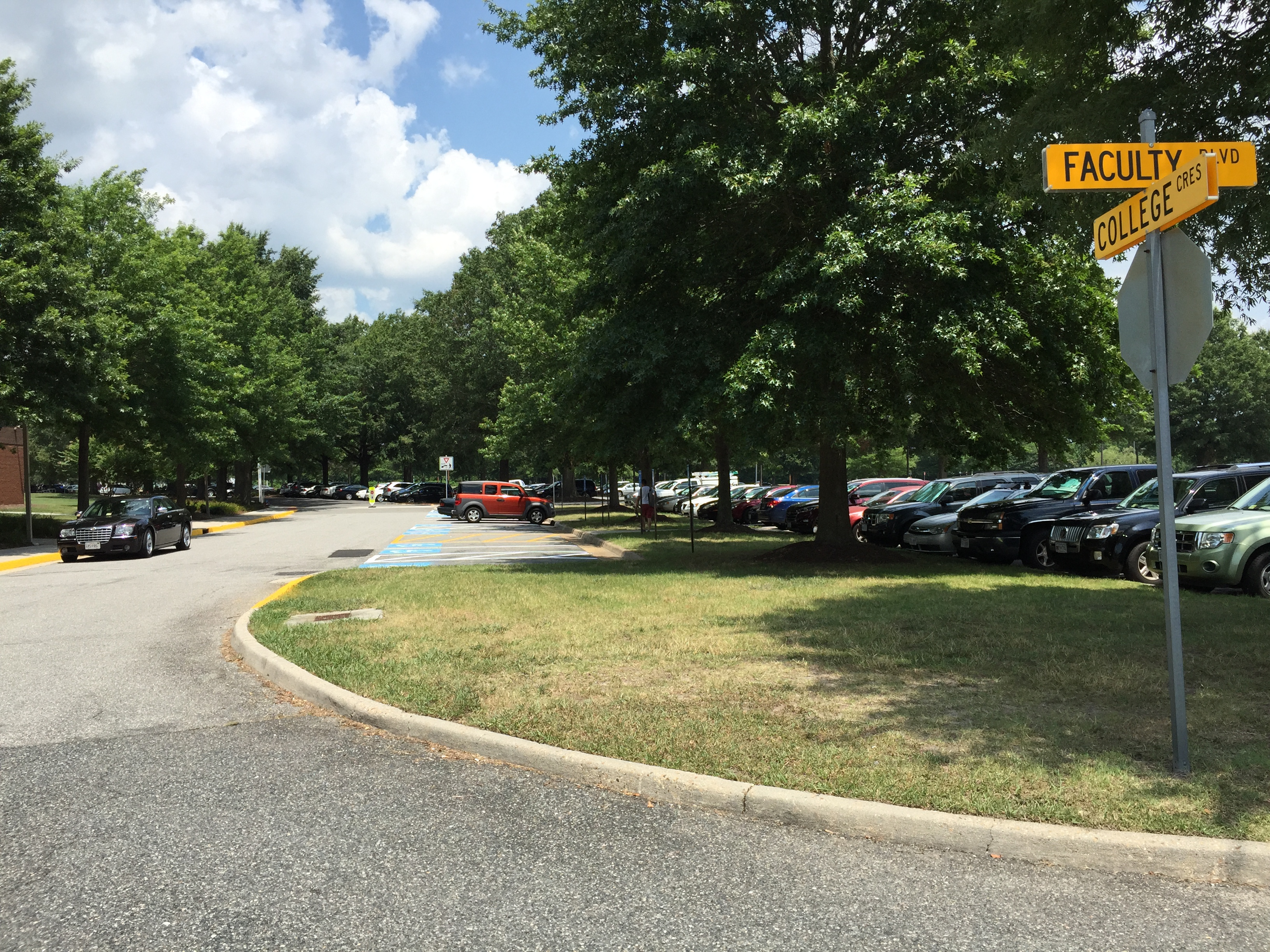
SR 350, the designation for College Crescent in the Tidewater Community College, Virginia Beach Campus in Virginia Beach

State Route 350 is the designation for College Crescent in Tidewater Community College, Virginia Beach Campus in the City of Virginia Beach that is maintained by the Virginia Department of Transportation. The outside terminus for this road is SR 165. It was added to the state highway system in 1971.

== SR 353 ==
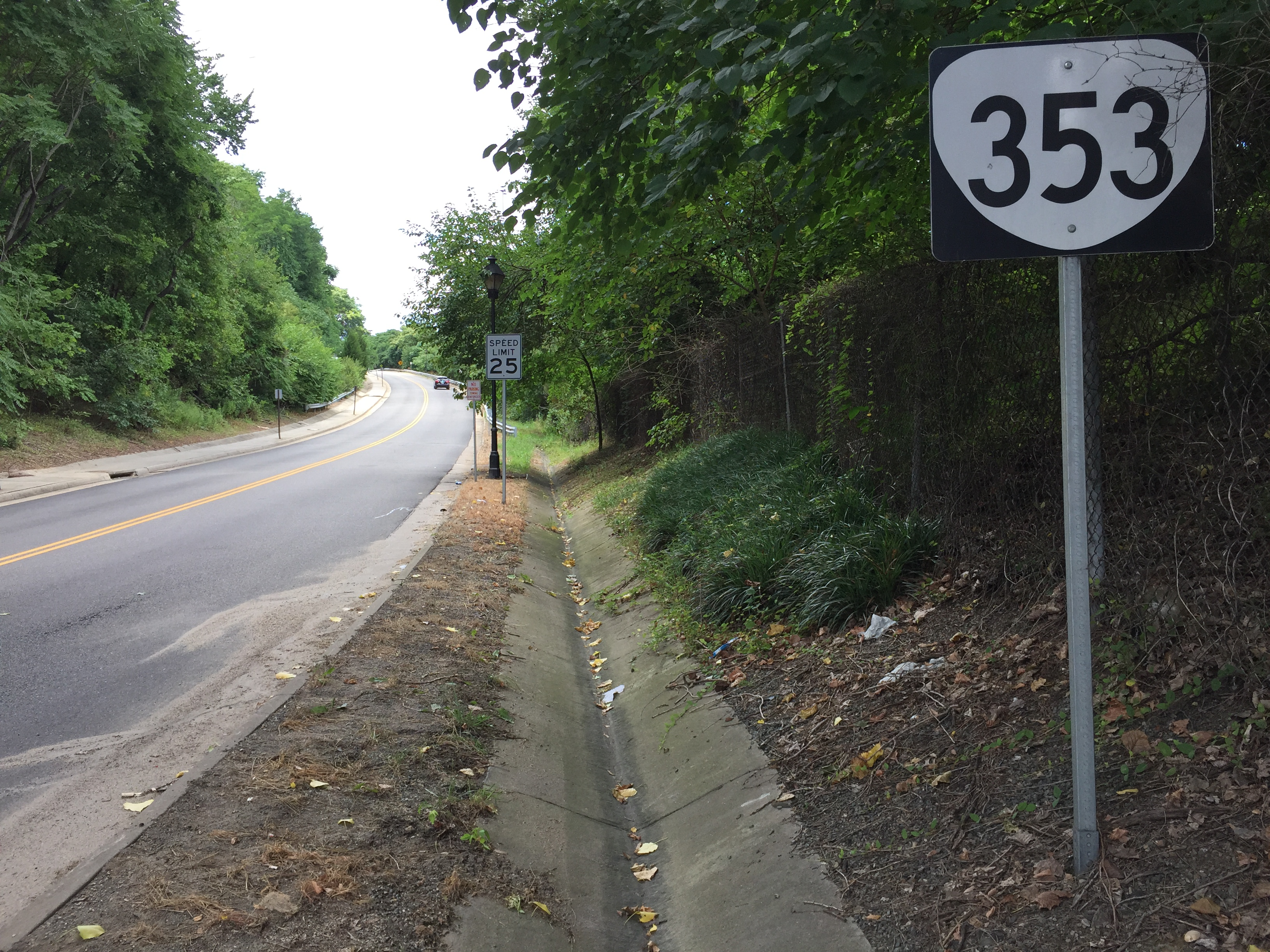
SR 353 along Duval Street Connector at 13th Street in Richmond

State Route 353 is the designation for roads in the Virginia Commonwealth University Medical Center campus grounds in Richmond. Though it has formerly included other roads, it is now only Duval Street Connection between 8th Street and the Main Hospital on 13th Street. Although located entirely within the city and connecting city-maintained streets, Route 353 is maintained by the state, and, despite its short length, a single reassurance shield can be found westbound just after entering the route from 13th Street. SR 353 was first added to the state highway system in 1942, when 0.015 miles (0.024 km) from the end of East Clay Street south to the central power plant were taken over by the state. The current SR 353 was built in the 1950s as part of the Richmond-Petersburg Turnpike project, and the original roadway was removed from the system in 1973.

== SR 355 ==
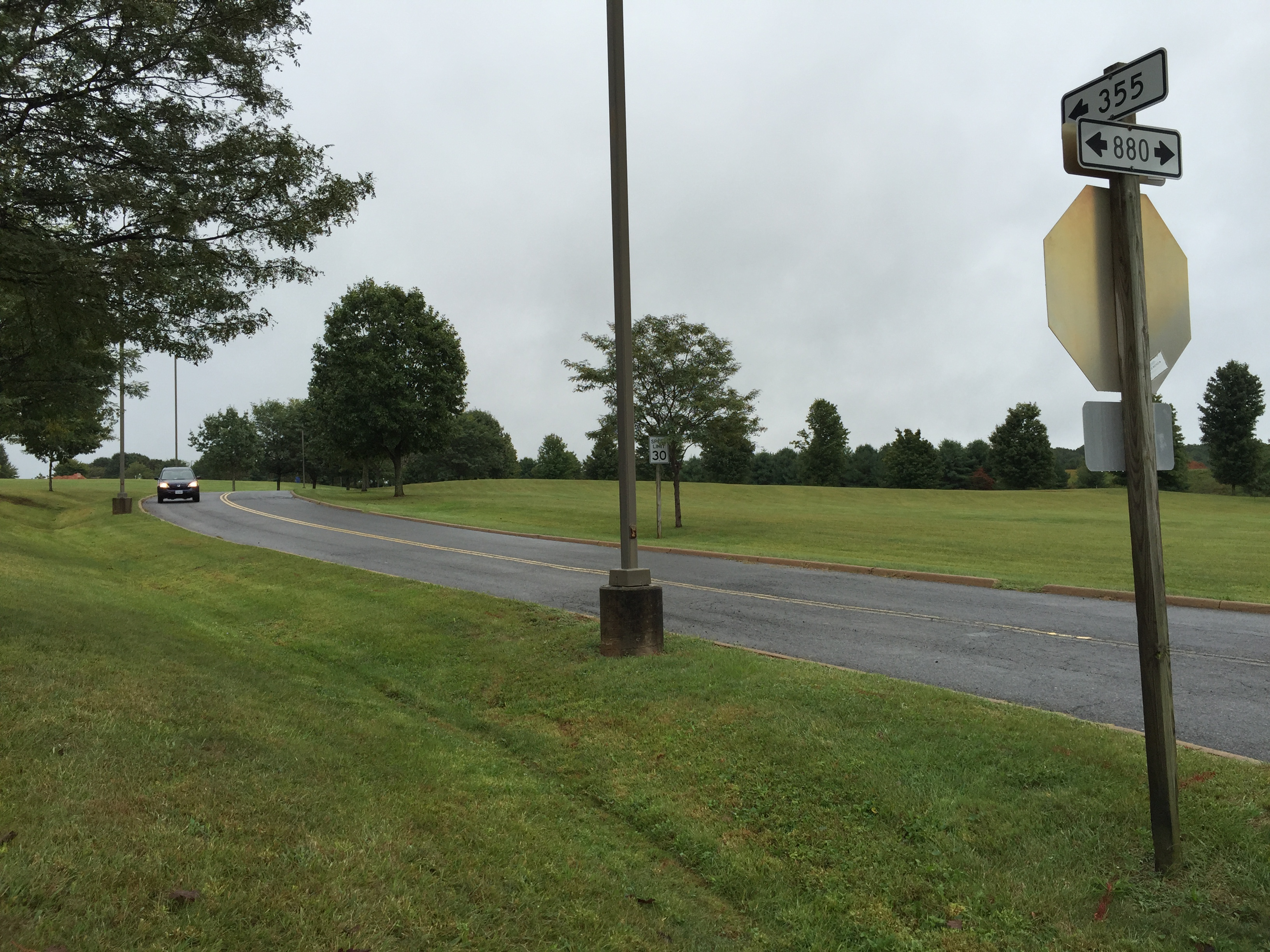
View east at the west end of SR 355 at SR 880 at Laurel Ridge Community College south of Warrenton

State Route 355 is the designation for College Street in Laurel Ridge Community College, Fauquier Campus, in Fauquier County near Warrenton that is maintained by the Virginia Department of Transportation. The western terminus for this road is SR 880 (near US 15). It was added to the state highway system about 2001.

== SR 355 (former) ==
State Route 355 was the designation for College Street, the entrance and main road of Radford University in the City of Radford that was maintained by the Virginia Department of Transportation. The northern terminus for this road was US 11, and the western terminus for this road was SR 177. It was added to the state highway system in 1947, and decommissioned in 1983.

== SR 357 (1965) ==
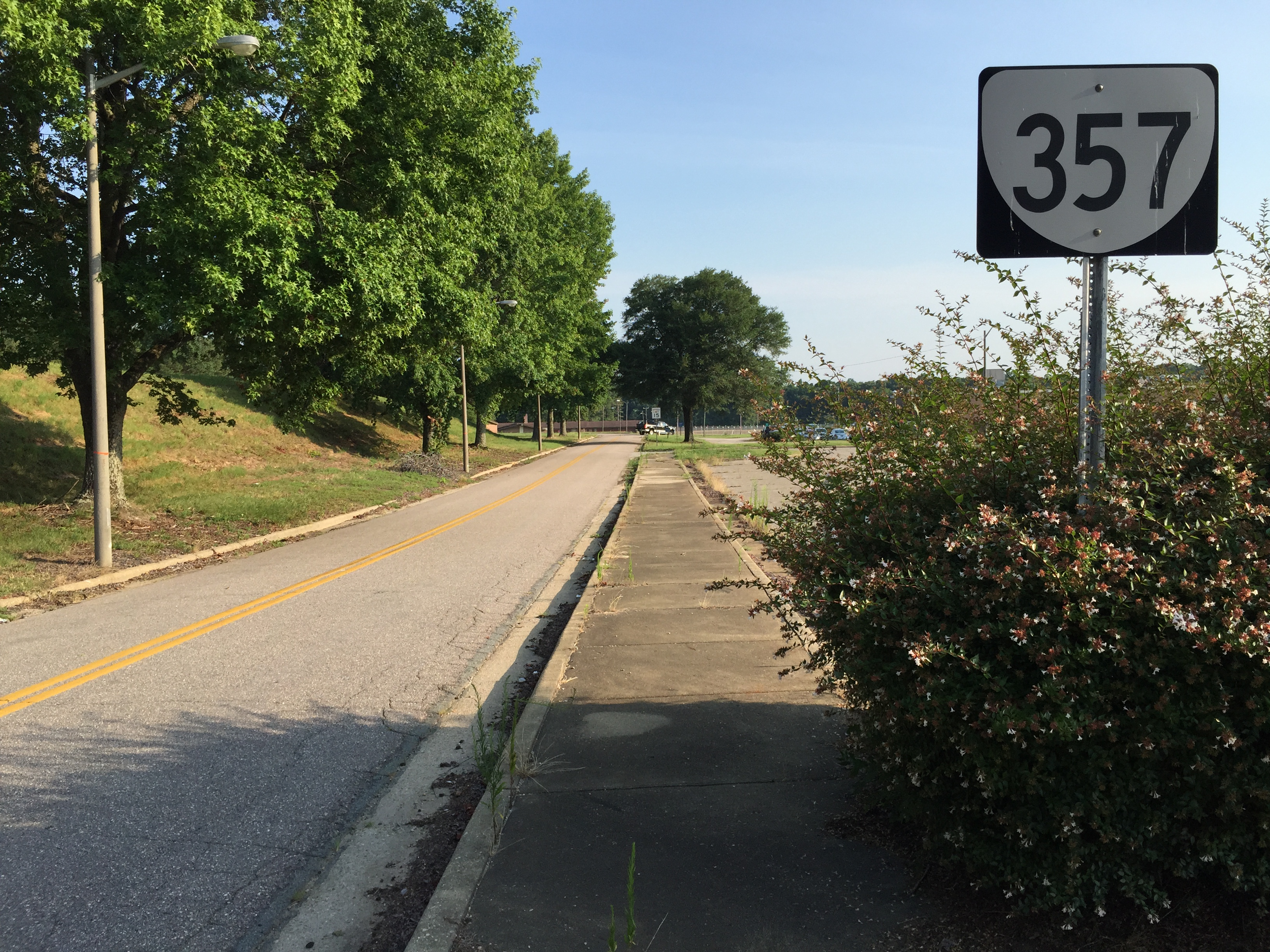
SR 357, the access road in the Southside Virginia Training Center southwest of Petersburg

State Route 357 was the designation for North Road and East Road, the access roads in the Southside Virginia Training Center just southwest of Petersburg in Dinwiddie County that are maintained by the Virginia Department of Transportation. The southern terminus for this road was US 1/US 460 Business. It was added to the state highway system in 1960. The Southside Virginia Training Center closed in 2014, and the property was demolished in 2017. The road was decommissioned in March 2019, and the road was demolished.

== SR 358 ==
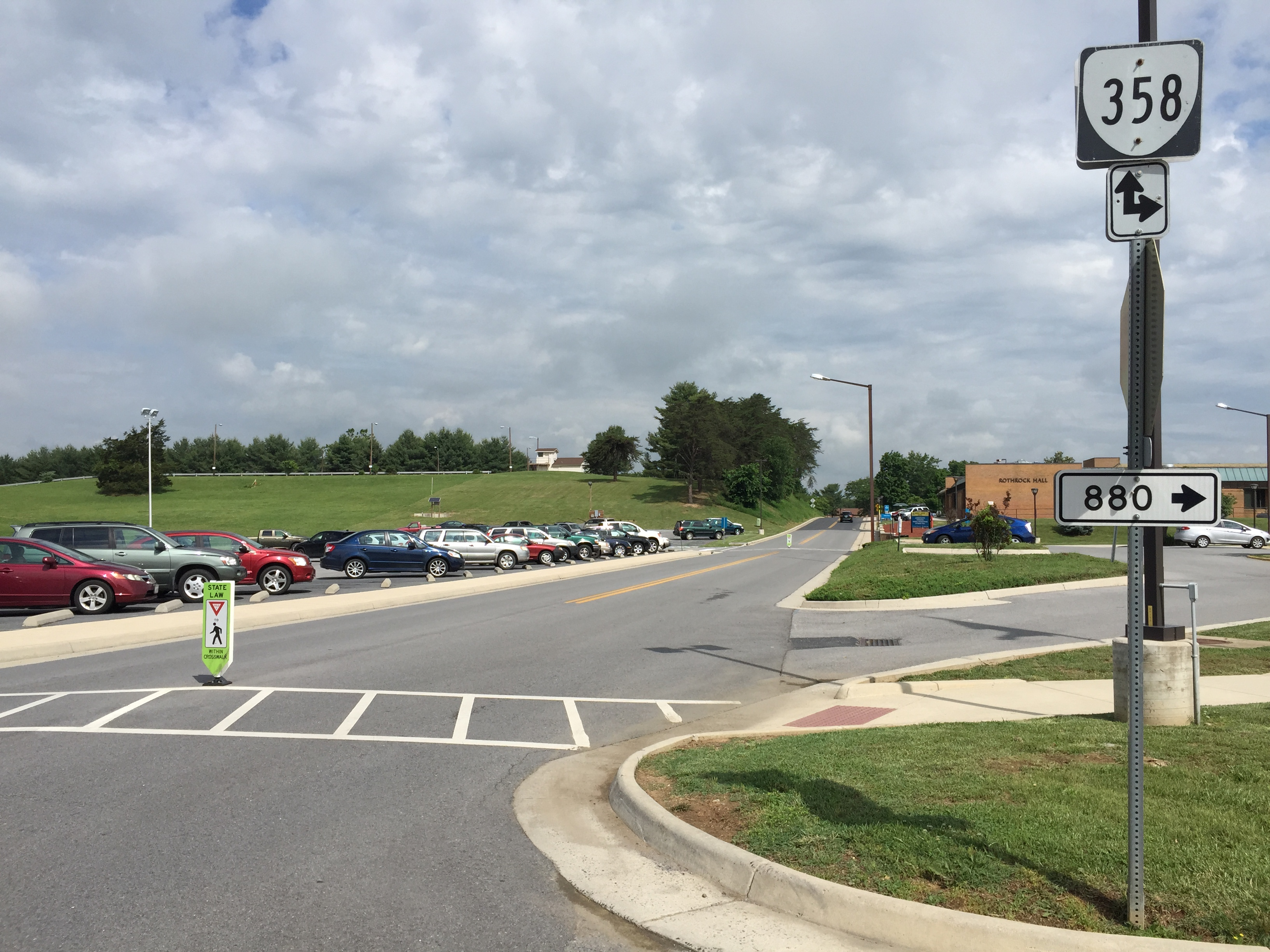
View north along SR 358 at SR 880 at the Wilson Workforce & Rehabilitation Center near Fishersville

State Route 358 is the designation for Woodrow Wilson Avenue and other roads within the Wilson Workforce & Rehabilitation Center near Fishersville in Augusta County that are maintained by the Virginia Department of Transportation. The southern terminus for this road is US 250. It was added to the state highway system in 1949.

== SR 361 ==
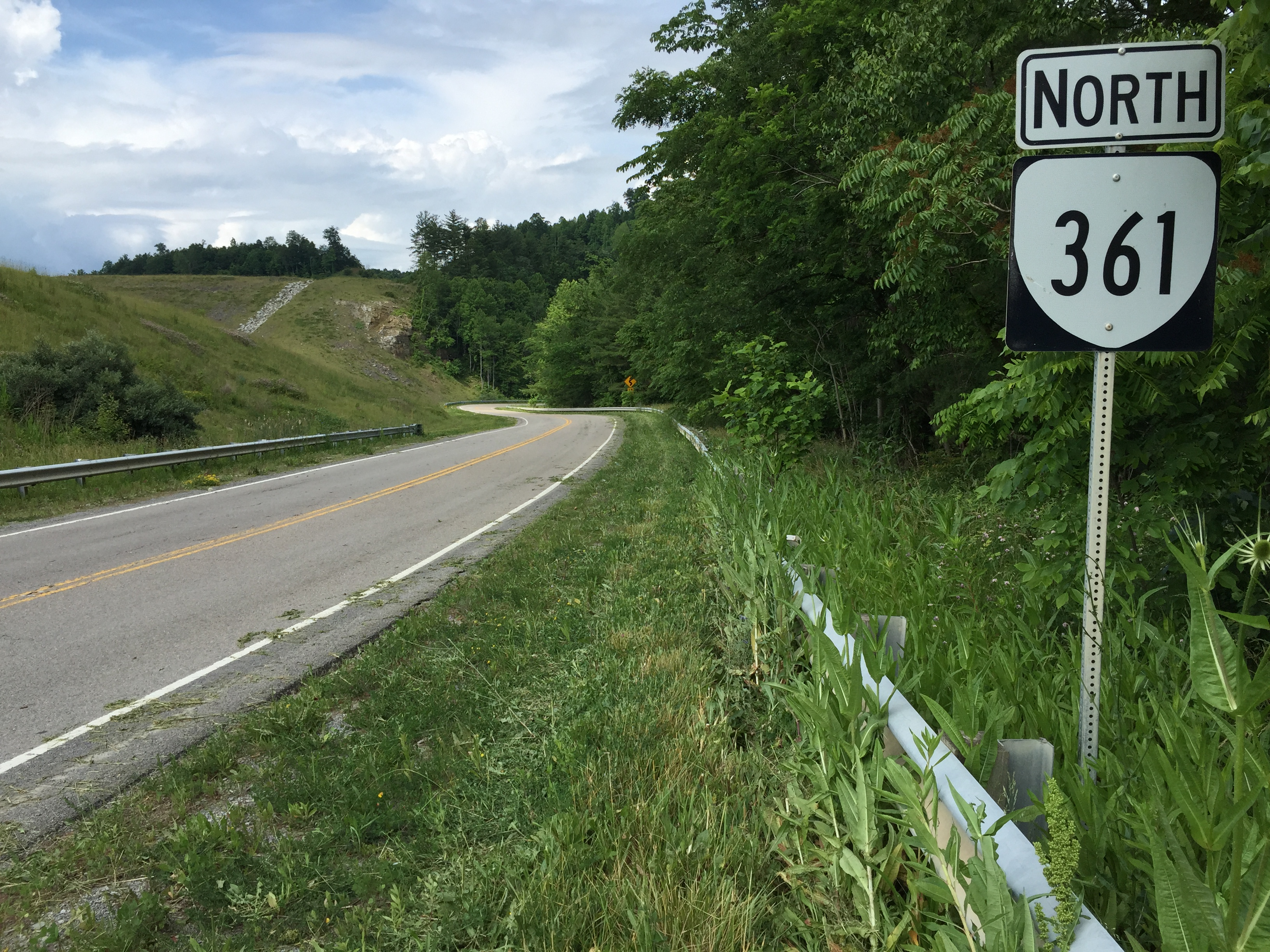
SR 361, the access road to Red Onion State Prison, in Dickenson County

State Route 361 is the designation for Red Onion State Prison Access Road, the entrance to Red Onion State Prison in Wise County that is maintained by the Virginia Department of Transportation. The northern terminus for this road is SR 83 in Dickenson County. The road crosses into Wise County where it meets the prison. The road was added to the state highway system in 1997.

== SR 361 (former) ==
State Route 361 was the designation for roads within the University of Virginia, Eastern Shore Campus in Accomack County that were maintained by the Virginia Department of Transportation. They were added to the state highway system in 1966, and removed in 1980.

== SR 362 ==
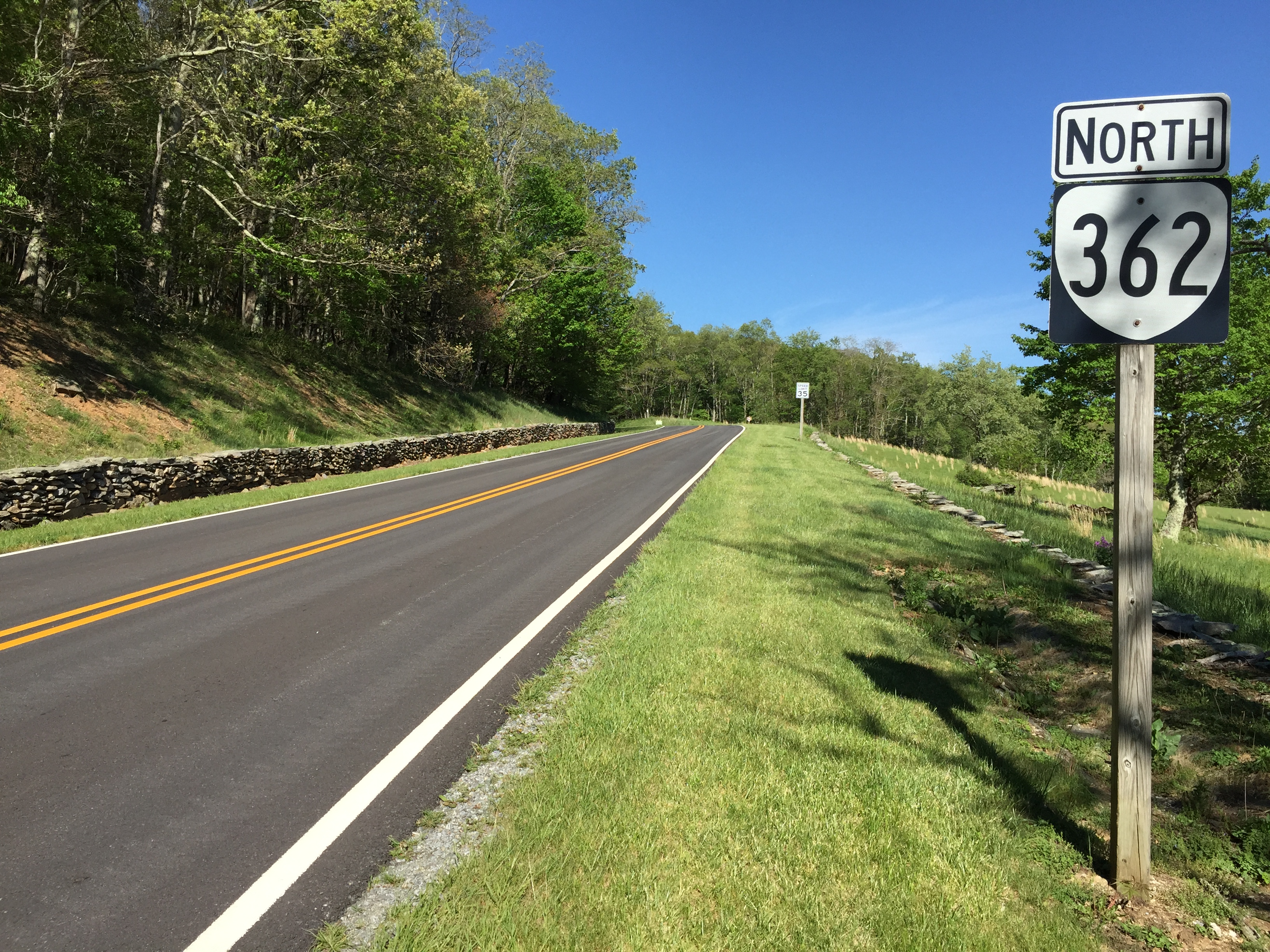
View north at the south end of SR 362 at US 58 in Grayson Highlands State Park in Grayson County

State Route 362 is the designation for Grayson Highland Lane, the entrance and main road within Grayson Highlands State Park in Grayson County that is maintained by the Virginia Department of Transportation. The southern terminus for this road is US 58. The road was added to the state highway system about 1976.

== SR 363 ==
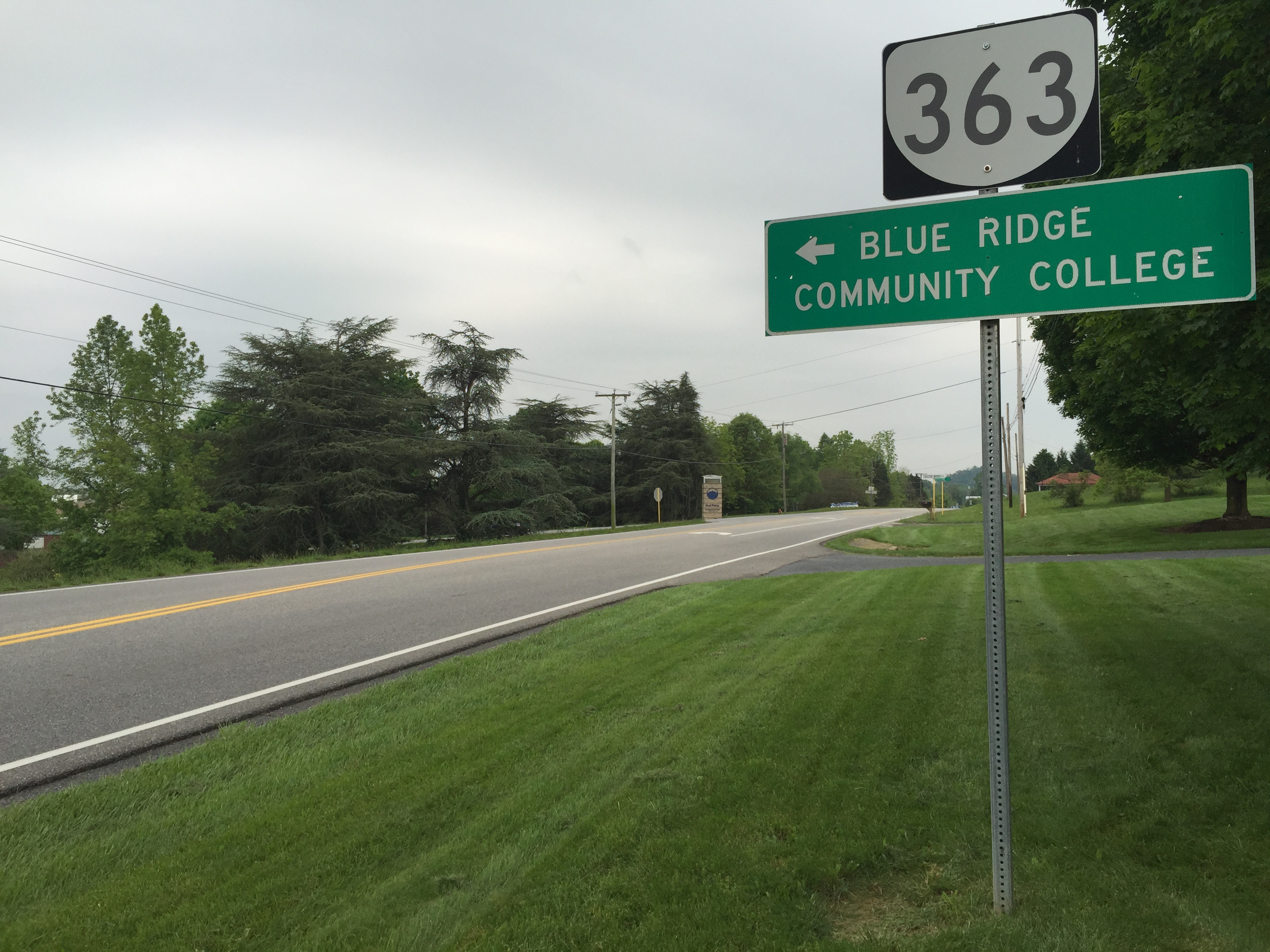
Sign for SR 363 along southbound US 11 in Augusta County

State Route 363 is the designation for College Lane, the entrance and main road within Blue Ridge Community College in Augusta County that is maintained by the Virginia Department of Transportation. The western terminus for this road (at both ends) is US 11. The road was added to the state highway system around 1967.

== SR 364 ==
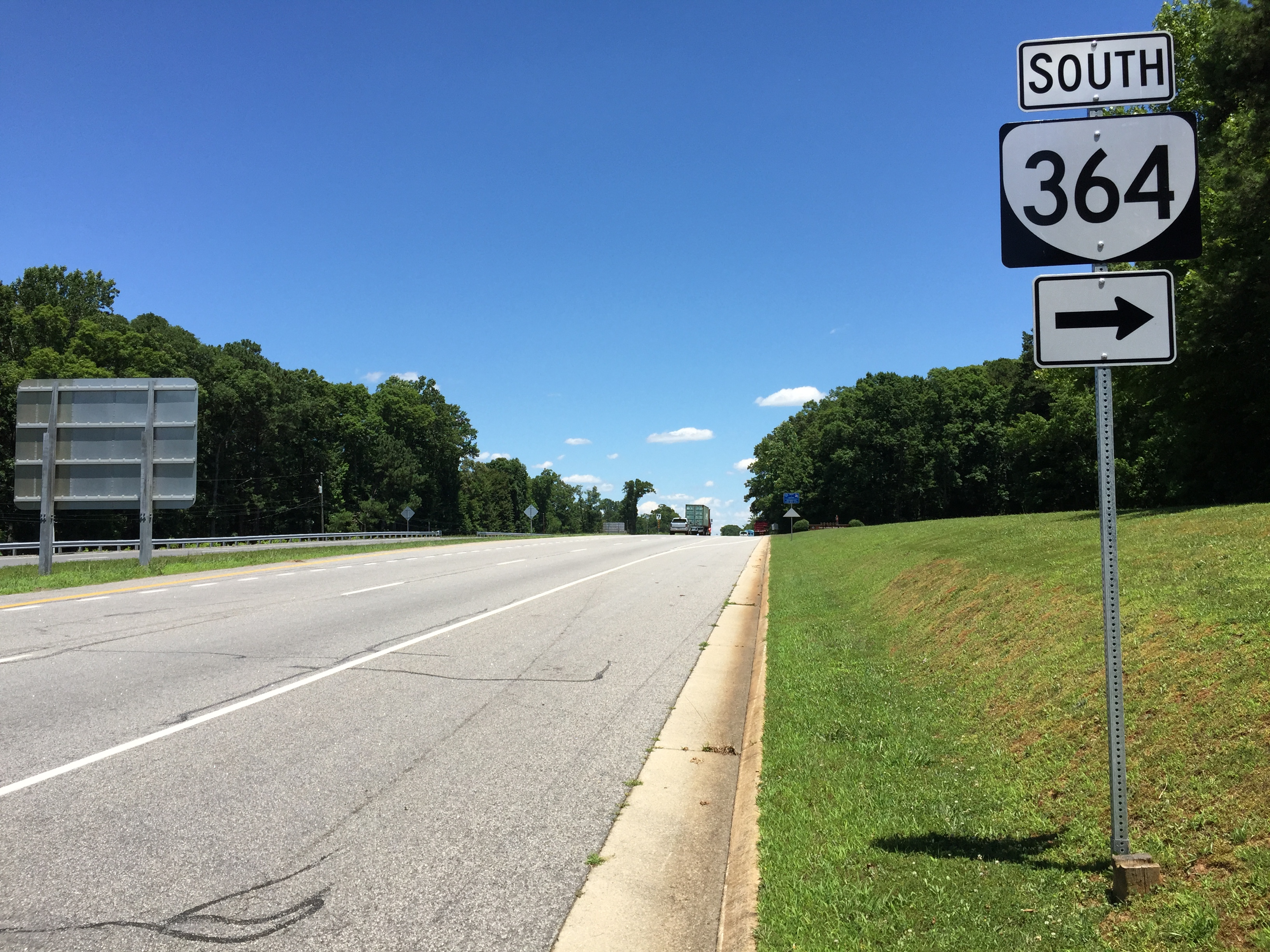
Sign for SR 364 on US 58 at Occoneechee State Park in Mecklenburg County

State Route 364 is the designation for Occoneechee Park Road, the entrance and main road within Occoneechee State Park in Mecklenburg County that is maintained by the Virginia Department of Transportation. The northern terminus for this road is US 58. The road was added to the state highway system in 1968.

== SR 365 ==
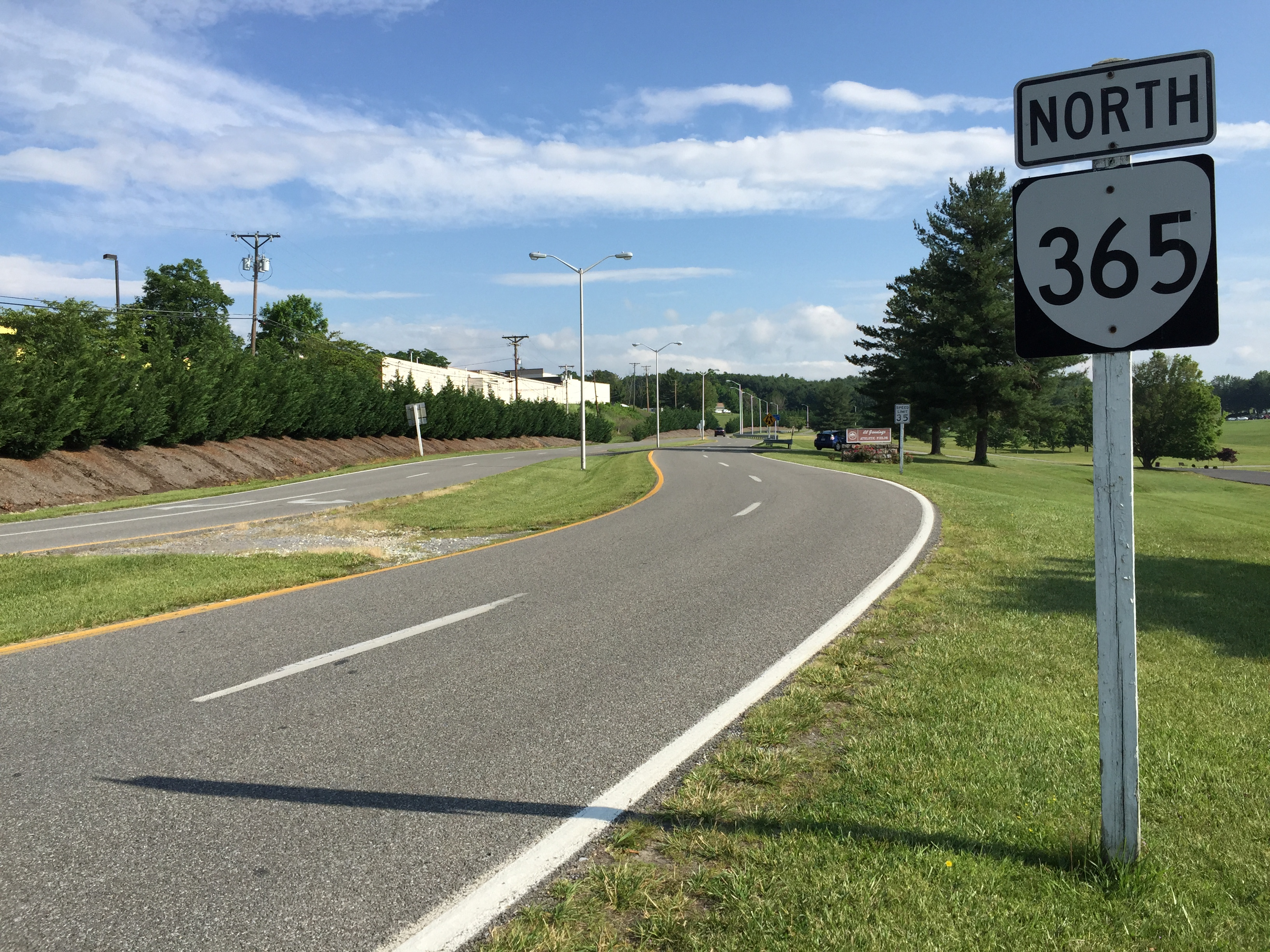
View north along SR 365 at US 11 at Wytheville Community College in Wytheville

State Route 365 is the designation for the entrance to Wytheville Community College in Wythe County that is maintained by the Virginia Department of Transportation. The southern terminus for this road is US 11. The road was added to the state highway system in 1965.

== SR 366 ==
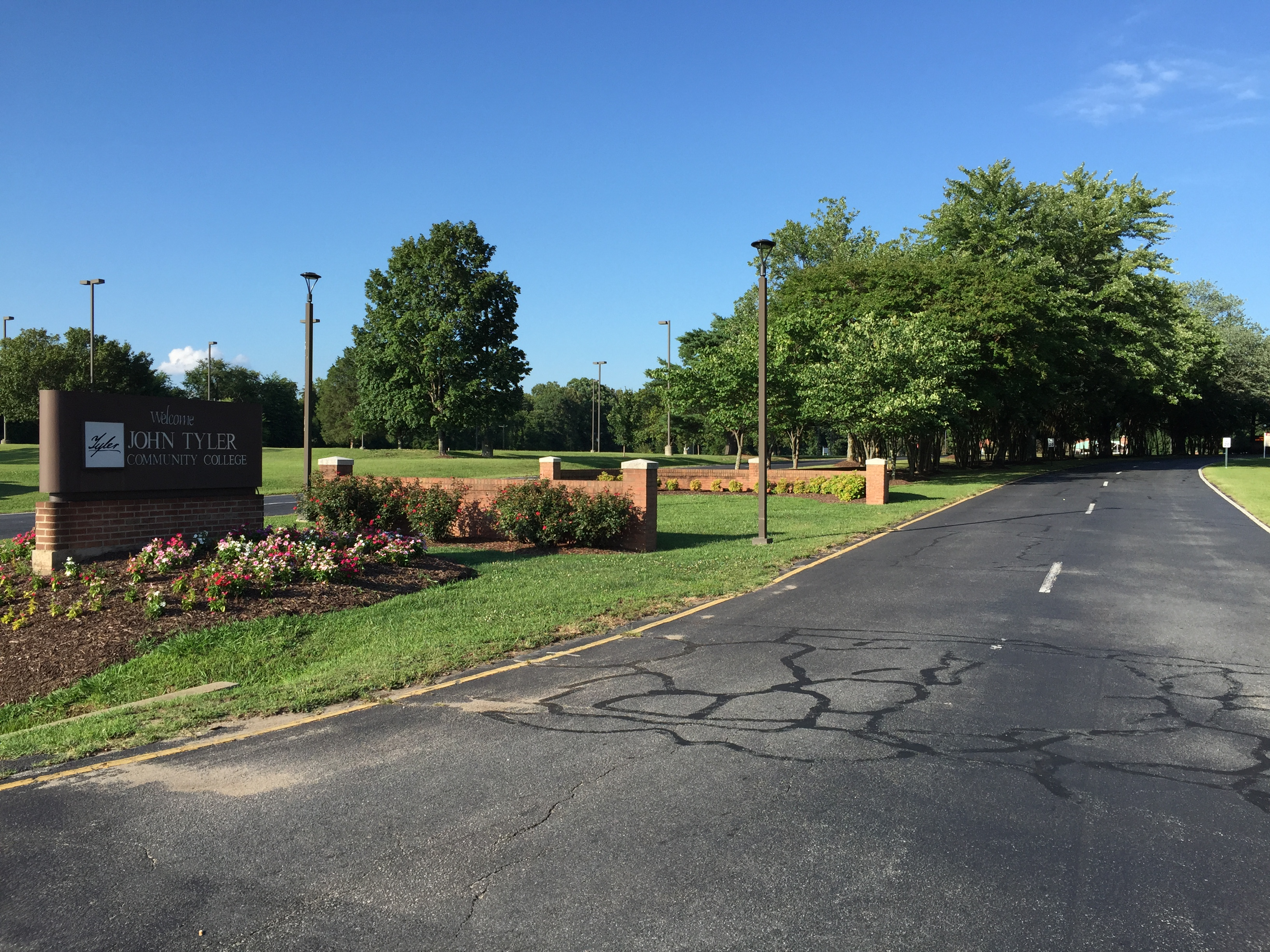
SR 366, the entrance from US 1/US 301 to Brightpoint Community College in Chesterfield County

State Route 366 is the designation for the entrance and roads in Brightpoint Community College in Chesterfield County that are maintained by the Virginia Department of Transportation. The western terminus for this road is US 1/US 301. The road was added to the state highway system about 1969.

== SR 367 ==
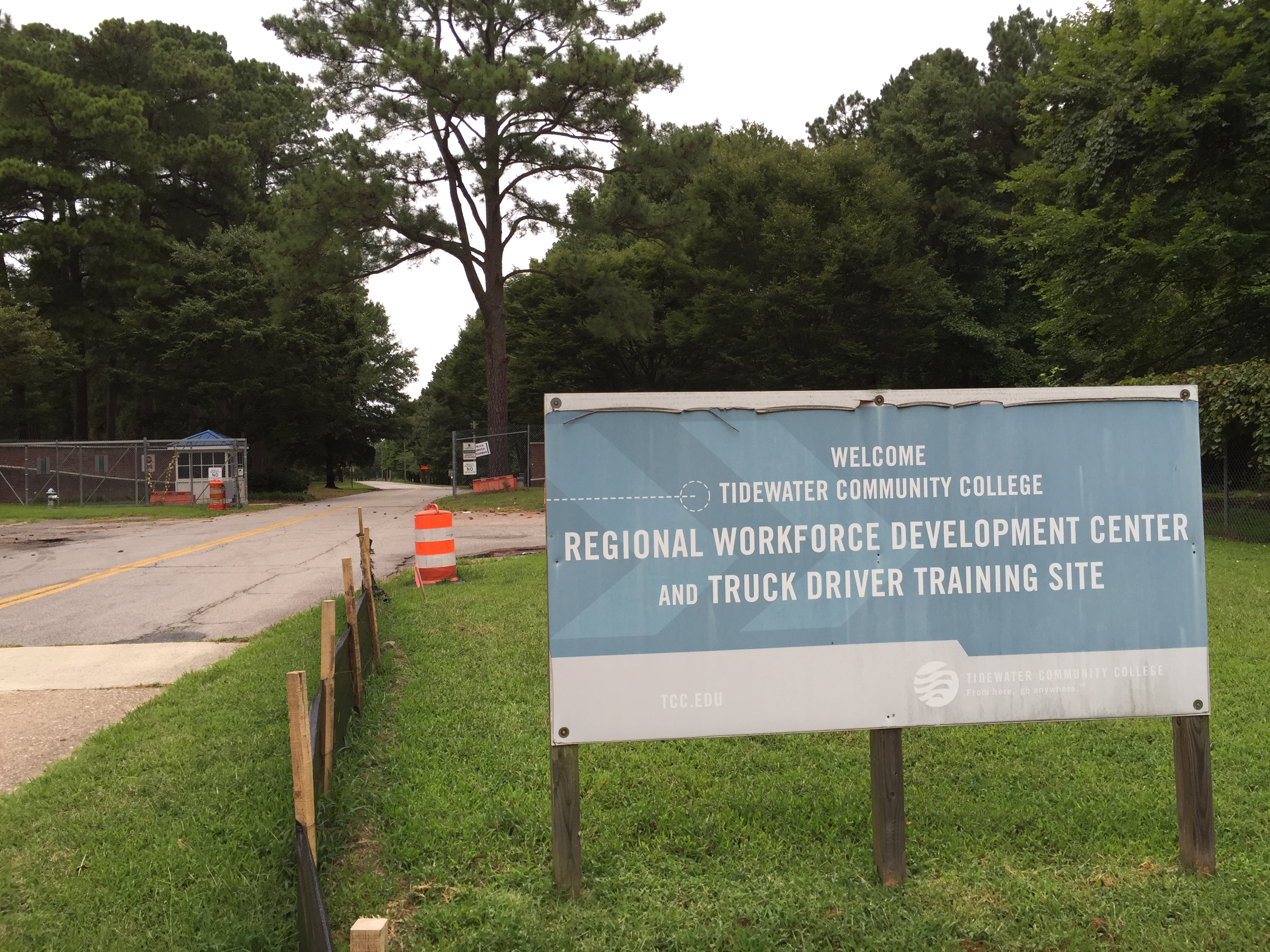
View north at the south end of SR 367 at SR 135 in Suffolk

State Route 367 is the designation for roads in Tidewater Community College's Regional Workforce Development Center and Truck Driver Training Site in the City of Suffolk that are maintained by the Virginia Department of Transportation. The southern terminus for these roads is SR 135. The roads were added to the state highway system in 1968.

== SR 368 ==
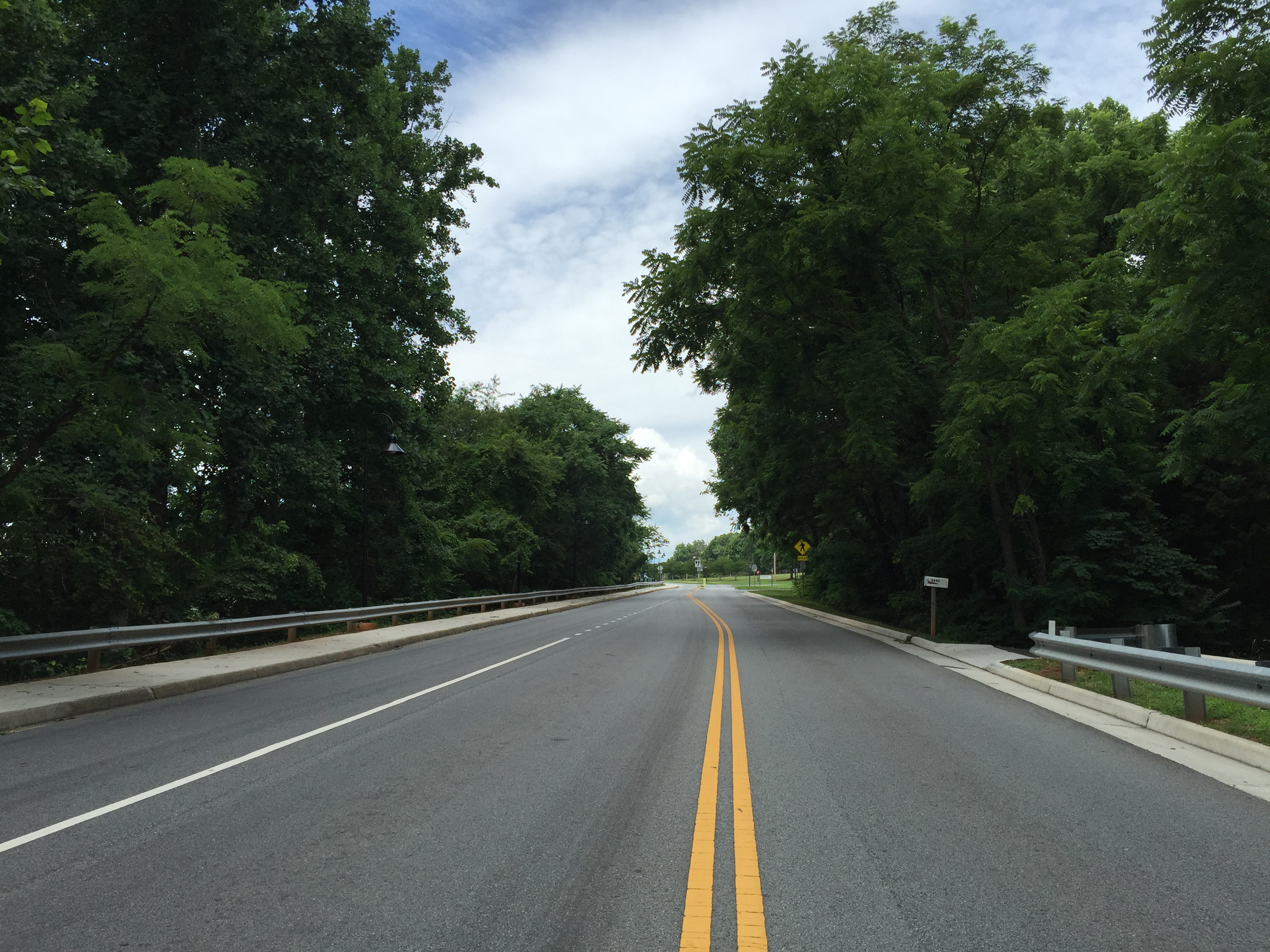
View west at the east end of SR 368 at US 29 Bus. on the campus of Central Virginia Community College in Lynchburg

State Route 368 is the designation for the access road for Central Virginia Community College in the City of Lynchburg that is maintained by the Virginia Department of Transportation. The eastern terminus for this road is US 29 Business. The western terminus for the road is Wards Ferry Road. The road was added to the state highway system in 1968.

== SR 369 ==
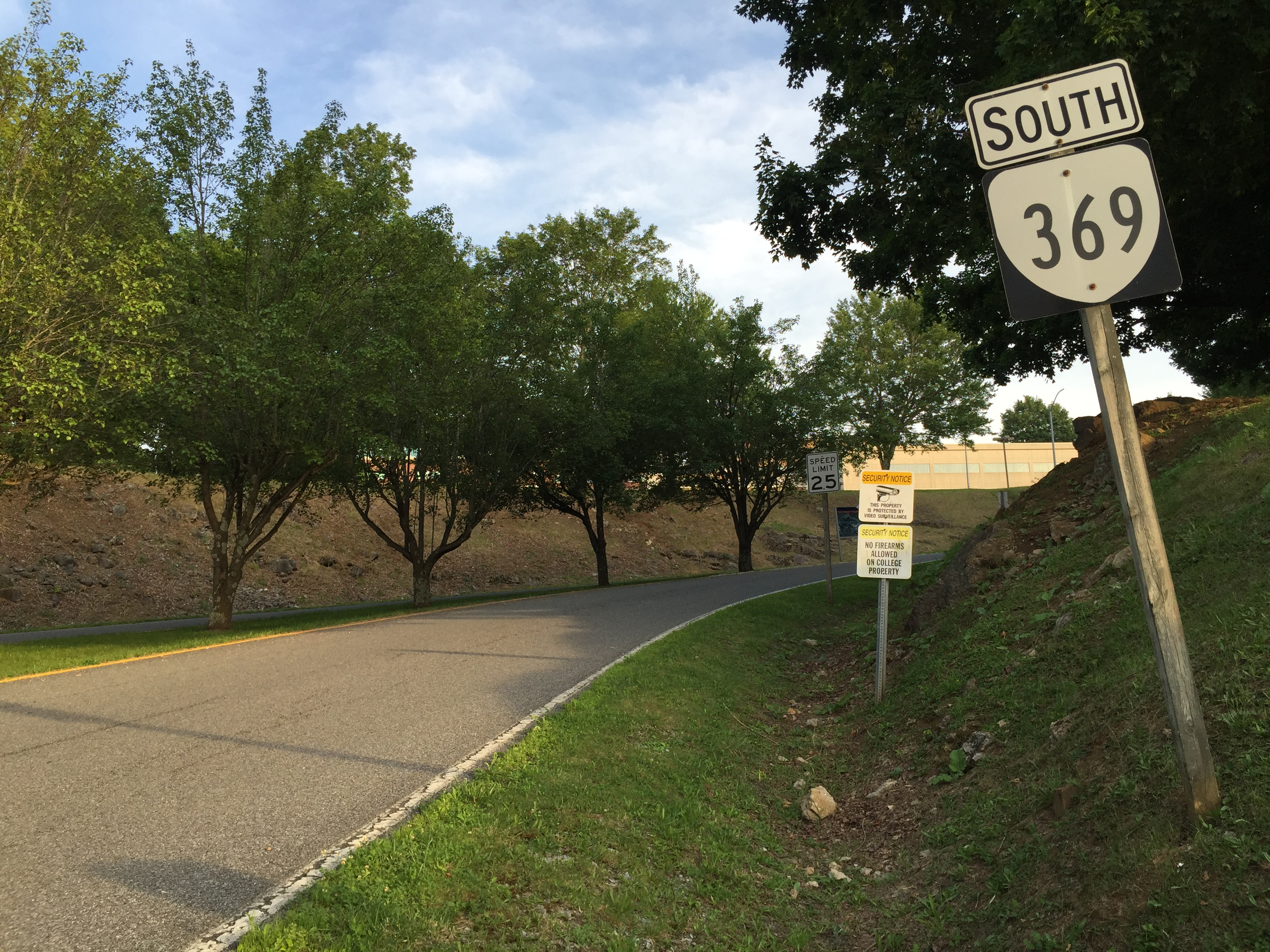
View south on SR 369 at US 19 at Southwest Virginia Community College in Tazewell County

State Route 369 is the designation for roads on the grounds of Southwest Virginia Community College in Tazewell County and Russell County that are maintained by the Virginia Department of Transportation. The northern termini for these roads is US 19. The roads were added to the state highway system in 1968.

== SR 370 ==
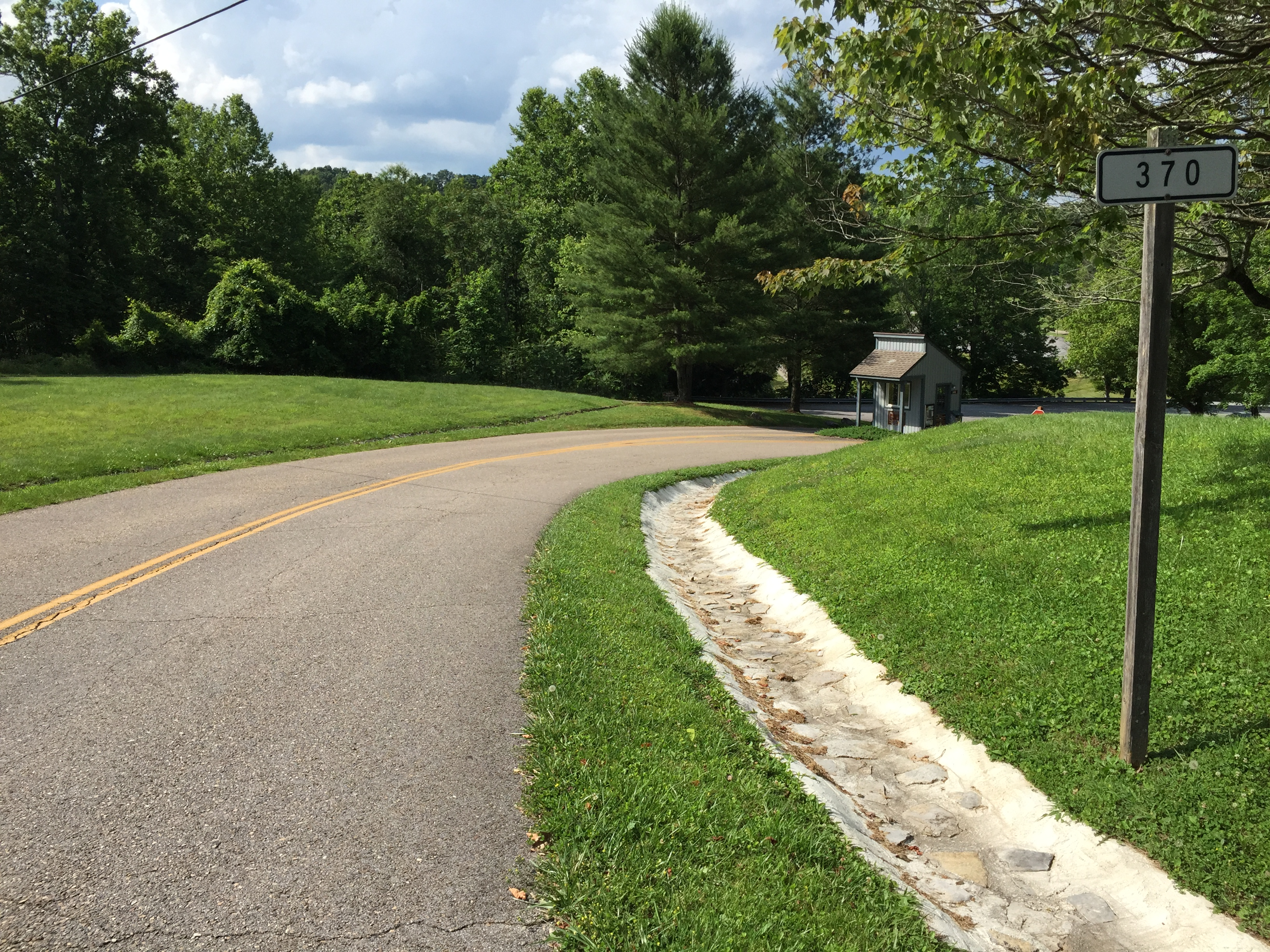
SR 370 north of SR 646 in Natural Tunnel State Park in Scott County

State Route 370 is the designation for roads within Natural Tunnel State Park in Scott County that are maintained by the Virginia Department of Transportation. The western terminus for this road is SR 871. The road was added to the state highway system in 1970. Previously the park was under private ownership.

== SR 371 ==
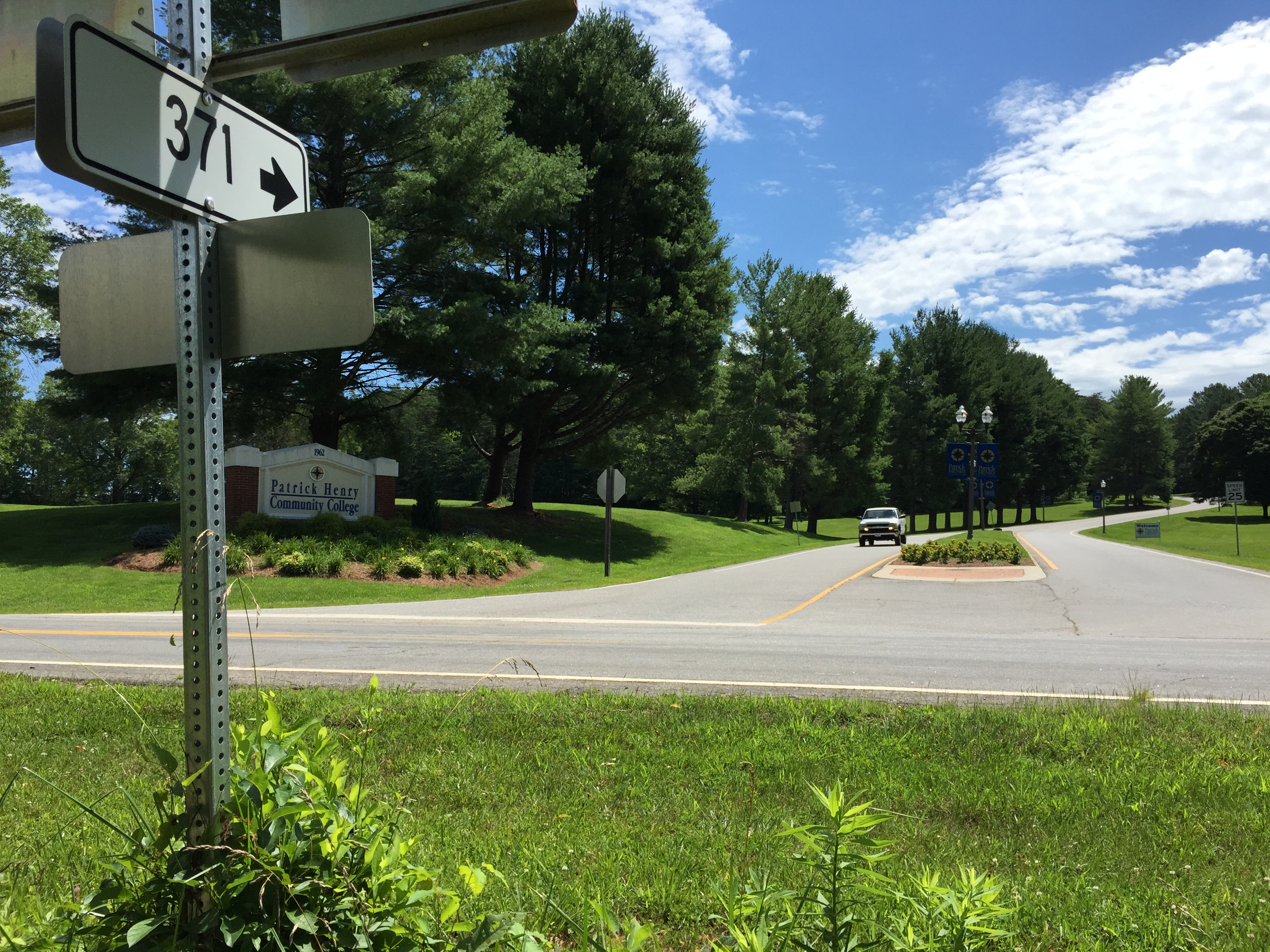
View east at the west end of SR 371 at SR 714 northeast of Collinsville

State Route 371 is the designation for Patriot Avenue and other roads on the grounds of Patrick & Henry Community College in Henry County that are maintained by the Virginia Department of Transportation. The western terminus for these roads is SR 714. The roads were added to the state highway system in 1971.

== SR 372 ==
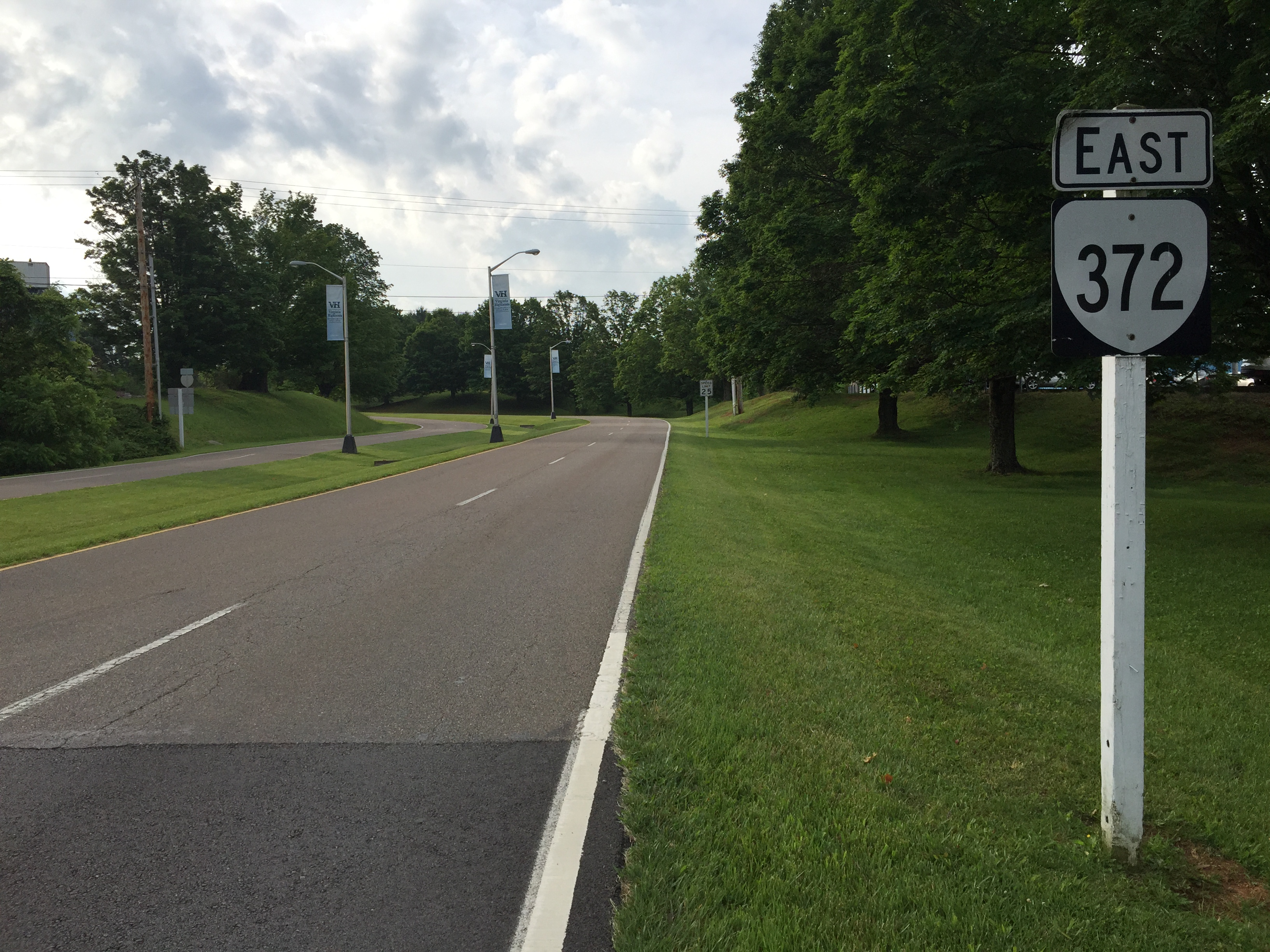
View east along SR 372 at SR 140 in Abingdon

State Route 372 is the designation for VHCC Drive, the entrance road for Virginia Highlands Community College in Washington County that is maintained by the Virginia Department of Transportation. The western terminus for this road is SR 140. The road was added to the state highway system in 1970.

== SR 373 ==
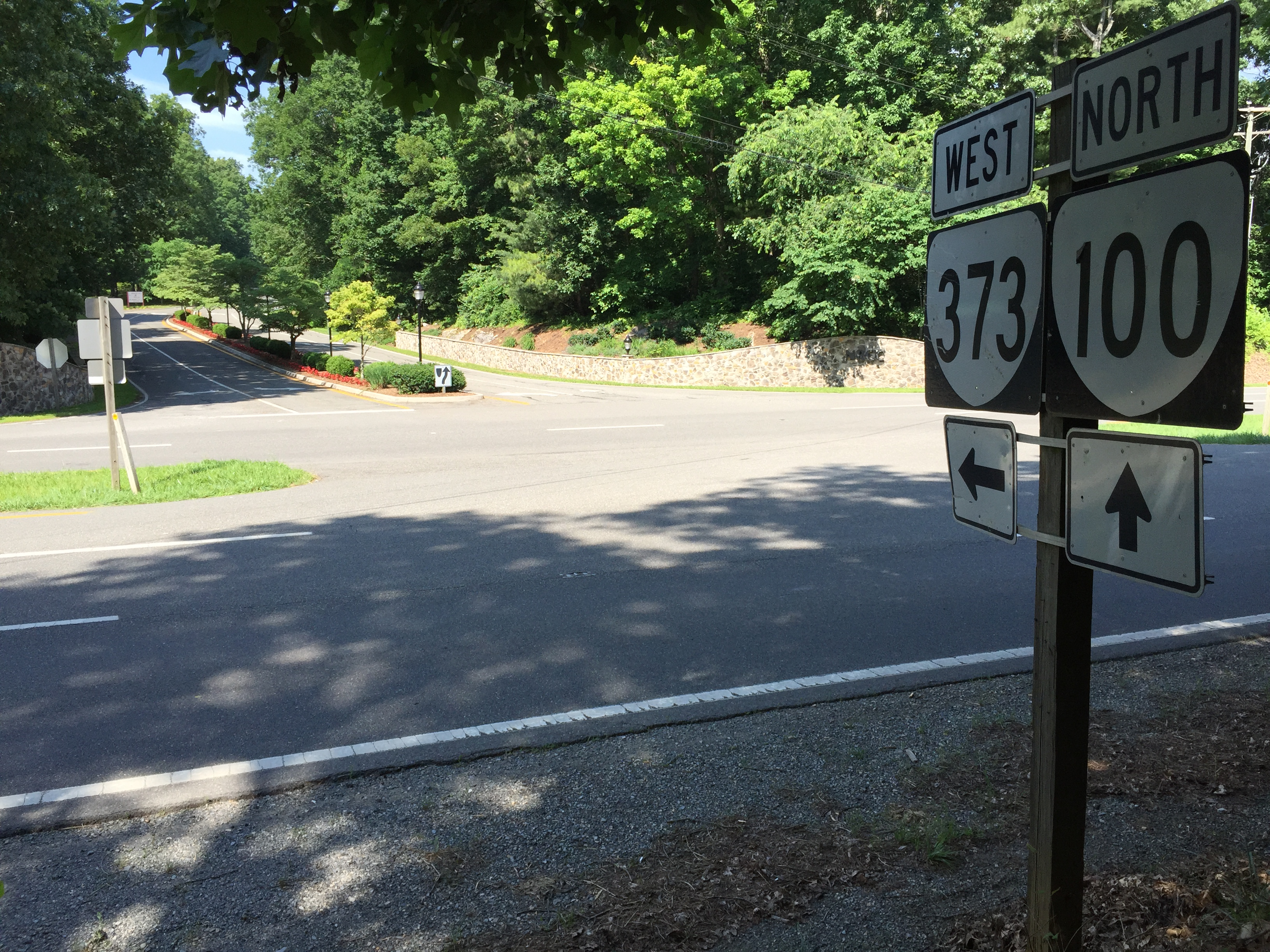
East end of SR 373 at SR 100 in Dublin

State Route 373 is the designation for College Drive, the entrance to New River Community College in Pulaski County that is maintained by the Virginia Department of Transportation. The termini for these roads are SR 100 and US 11. The roads were added to the state highway system in 1971.

== SR 374 ==
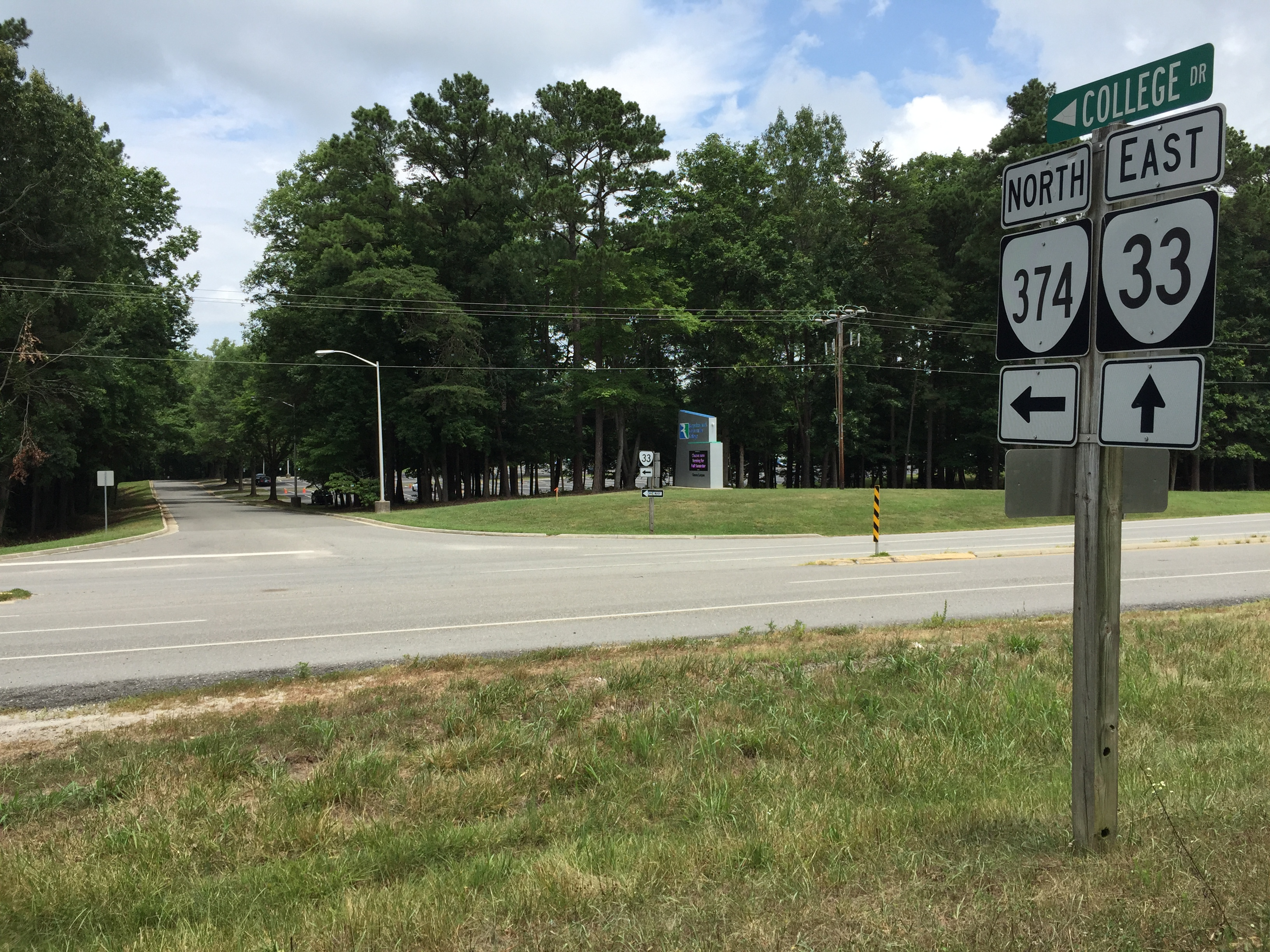
View north along SR 374 at SR 33 at Rappahannock Community College in Glenns

State Route 374 is the designation for College Drive, the entrance of Rappahannock Community College, South Campus in Gloucester County that is maintained by the Virginia Department of Transportation. The southern terminus for this road is SR 33. The roads were added to the state highway system in 1971.

== SR 375 ==
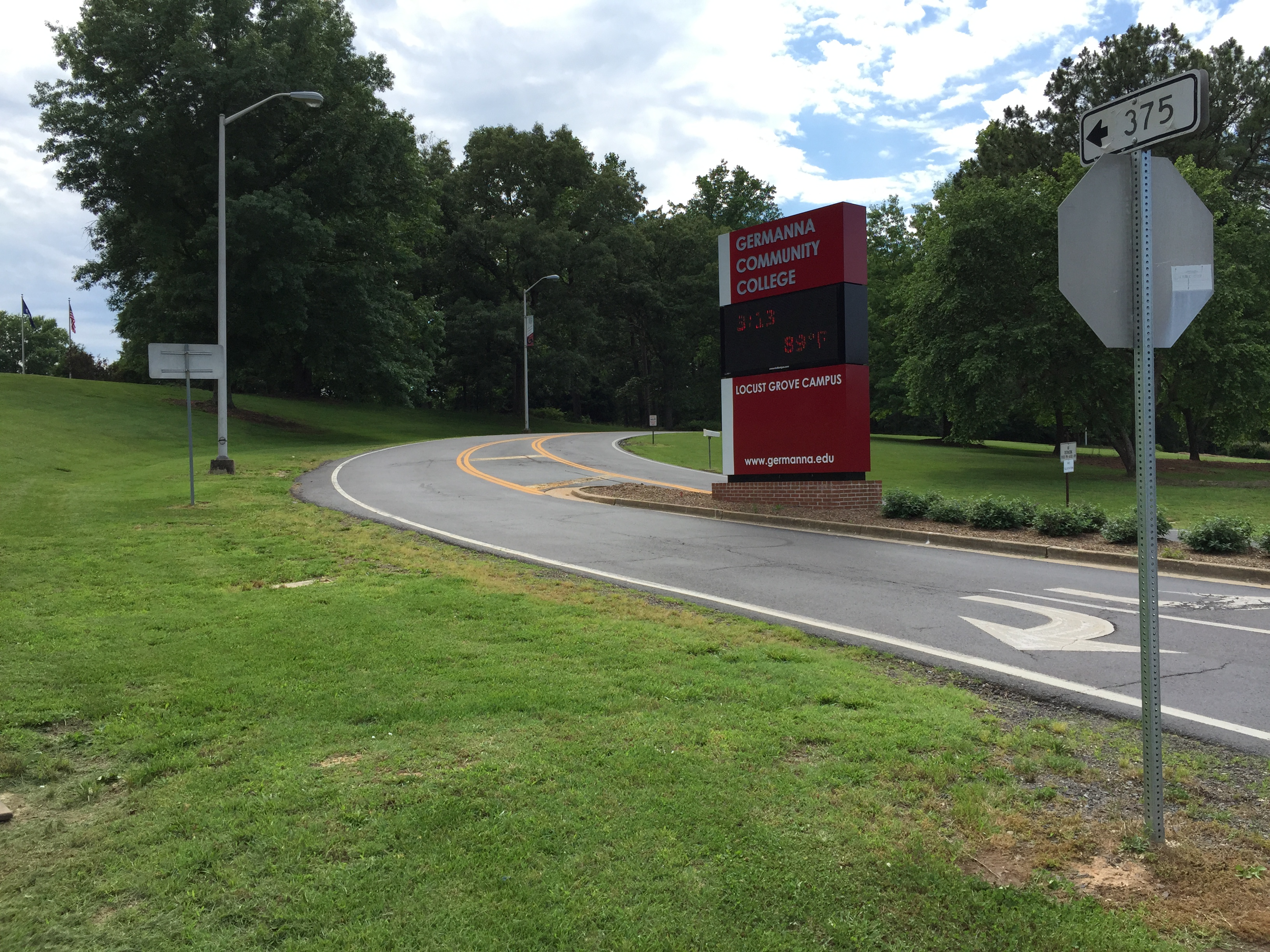
View west at the east end of SR 375 at SR 3 at Germanna Community College in Germanna Bridge

State Route 375 is the designation for College Drive, the entrance of Germanna Community College in Orange County that is maintained by the Virginia Department of Transportation. The northern terminus for this road is SR 3. The road was added to the state highway system in 1970.

== SR 376 ==
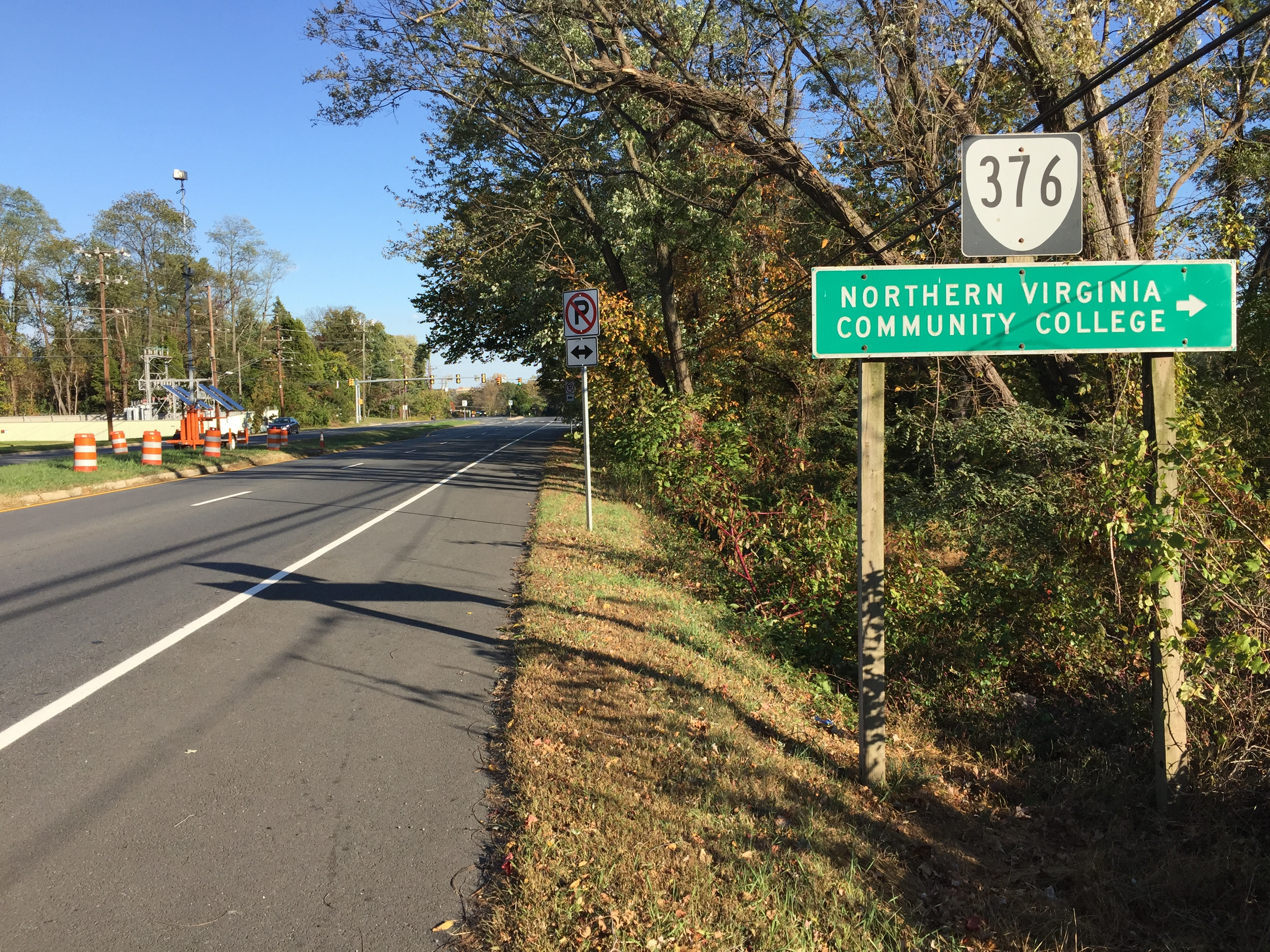
View east along SR 236 at SR 376 at Northern Virginia Community College, Annandale Campus in Wakefield

State Route 376 is the designation for Lake Drive, East Drive, West Drive and Center Drive, the roads on the grounds of Northern Virginia Community College, Annandale Campus in Fairfax County that are maintained by the Virginia Department of Transportation. The northern terminus for these roads is SR 236. The roads were added to the state highway system in 1967.

== SR 377 ==
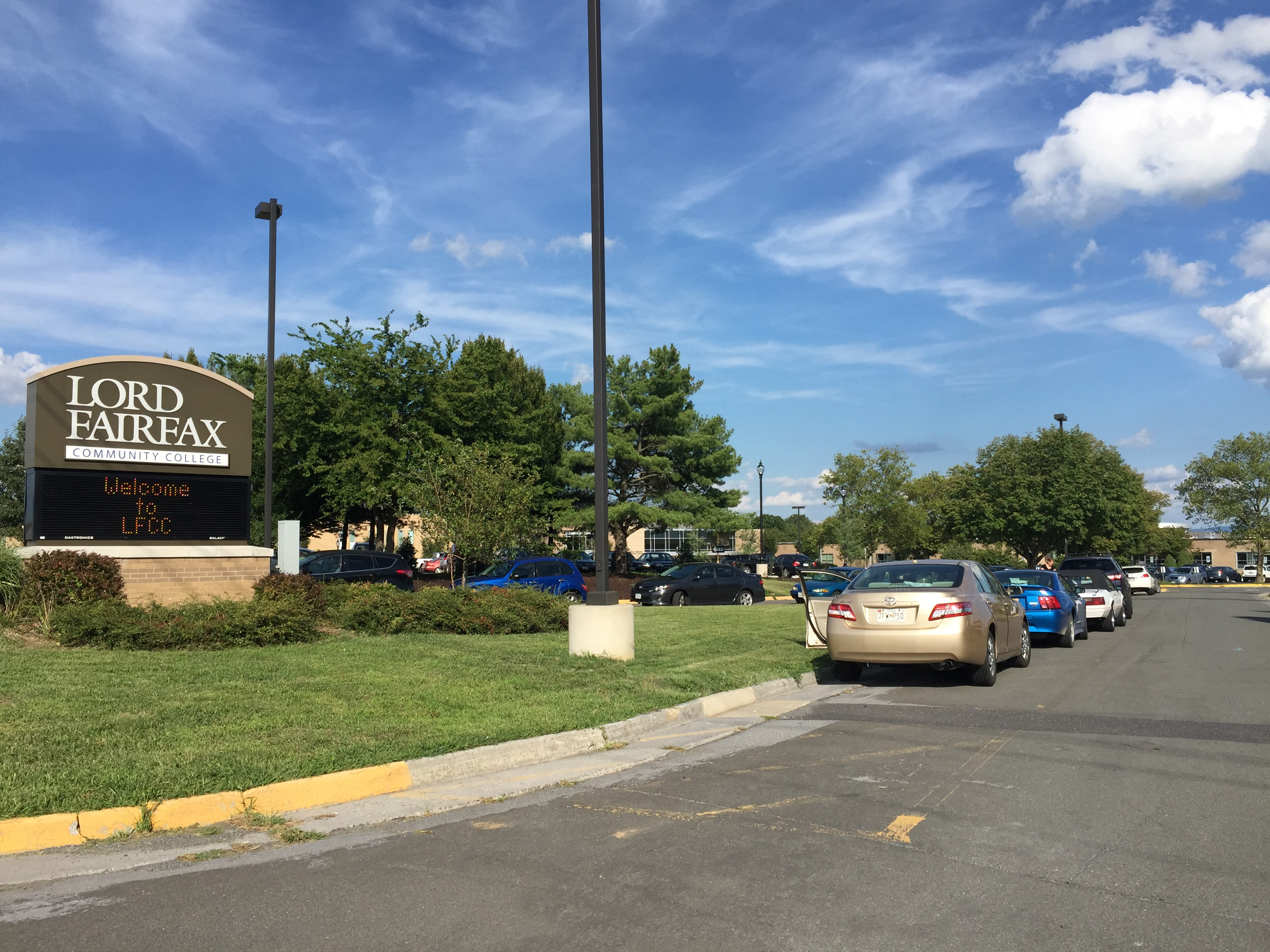
2016 view of SR 377, the loop joining Laurel Ridge Community College to US 11 north of Middletown (Lord Fairfax Community College was subsequently renamed Laurel Ridge Community College)

State Route 377 is the designation for a loop joining Laurel Ridge Community College to US 11 in Frederick County that is maintained by the Virginia Department of Transportation. The roads were added to the state highway system in 1971.

== SR 378 ==
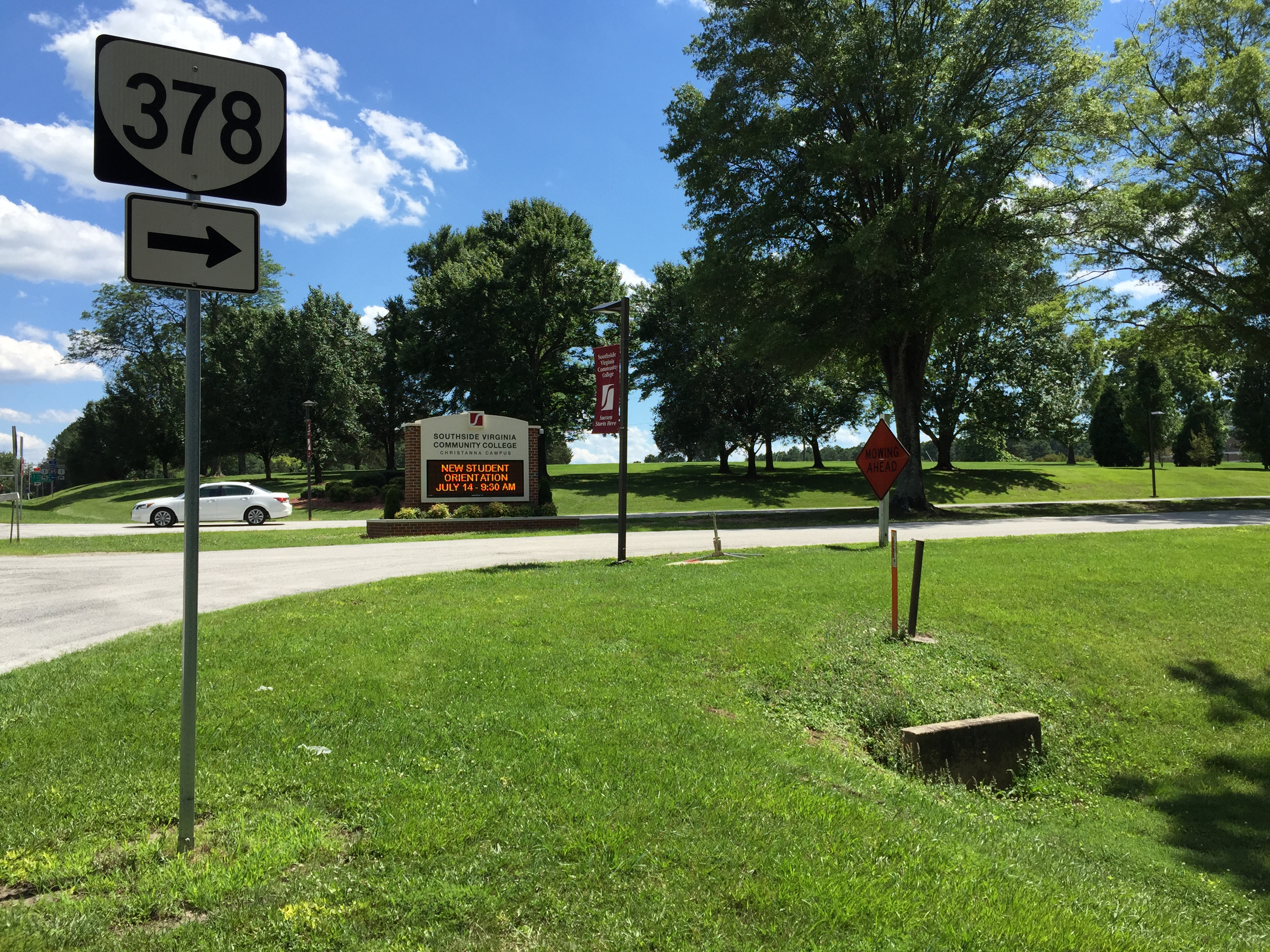
SR 378, the entrance from SR 46 to Southside Virginia Community College, Christiana Campus in Alberta

State Route 378 is the designation for Campus Drive and other roads on the grounds of Southside Virginia Community College, Christiana Campus in Brunswick County that are maintained by the Virginia Department of Transportation. The eastern terminus for these roads is SR 46. The roads were added to the state highway system in 1970.

== SR 379 ==
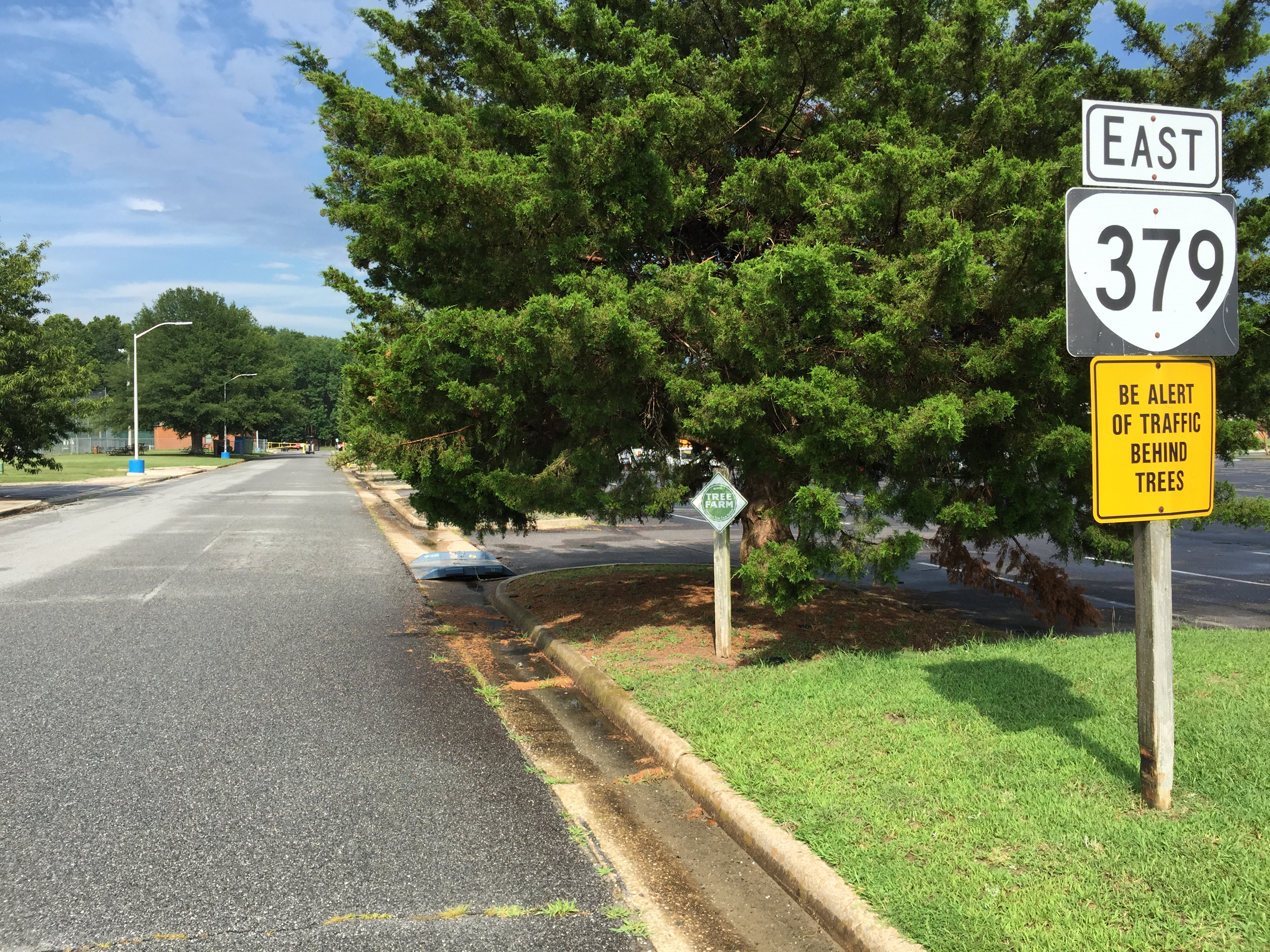
View east along SR 379 at SR 641 at Paul D. Camp Community College in Franklin

State Route 379 is the designation for the entrance roads of Paul D. Camp Community College in the City of Franklin that are maintained by the Virginia Department of Transportation. The western termini for these roads is College Drive. The roads were added to the state highway system about 1972.

== SR 382 ==
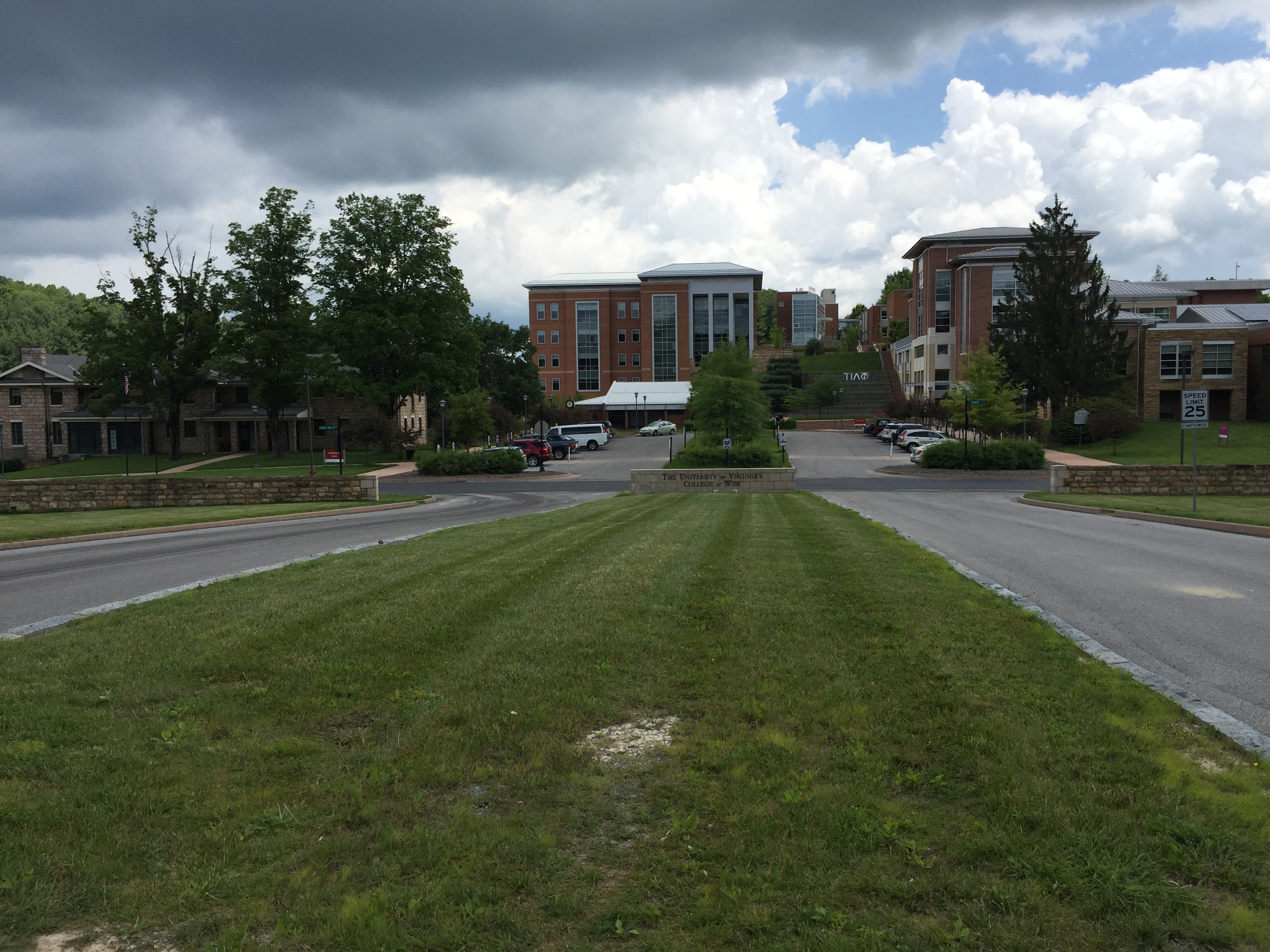
SR 382, the entrance from SR 646 to the University of Virginia's College at Wise in Wise County

State Route 382 is the designation for roads on the grounds of the University of Virginia's College at Wise in Wise County that are maintained by the Virginia Department of Transportation. The southern termini for these roads is SR 642, Coeburn Mountain Road. The roads were added to the state highway system in 1965.

== SR 383 ==
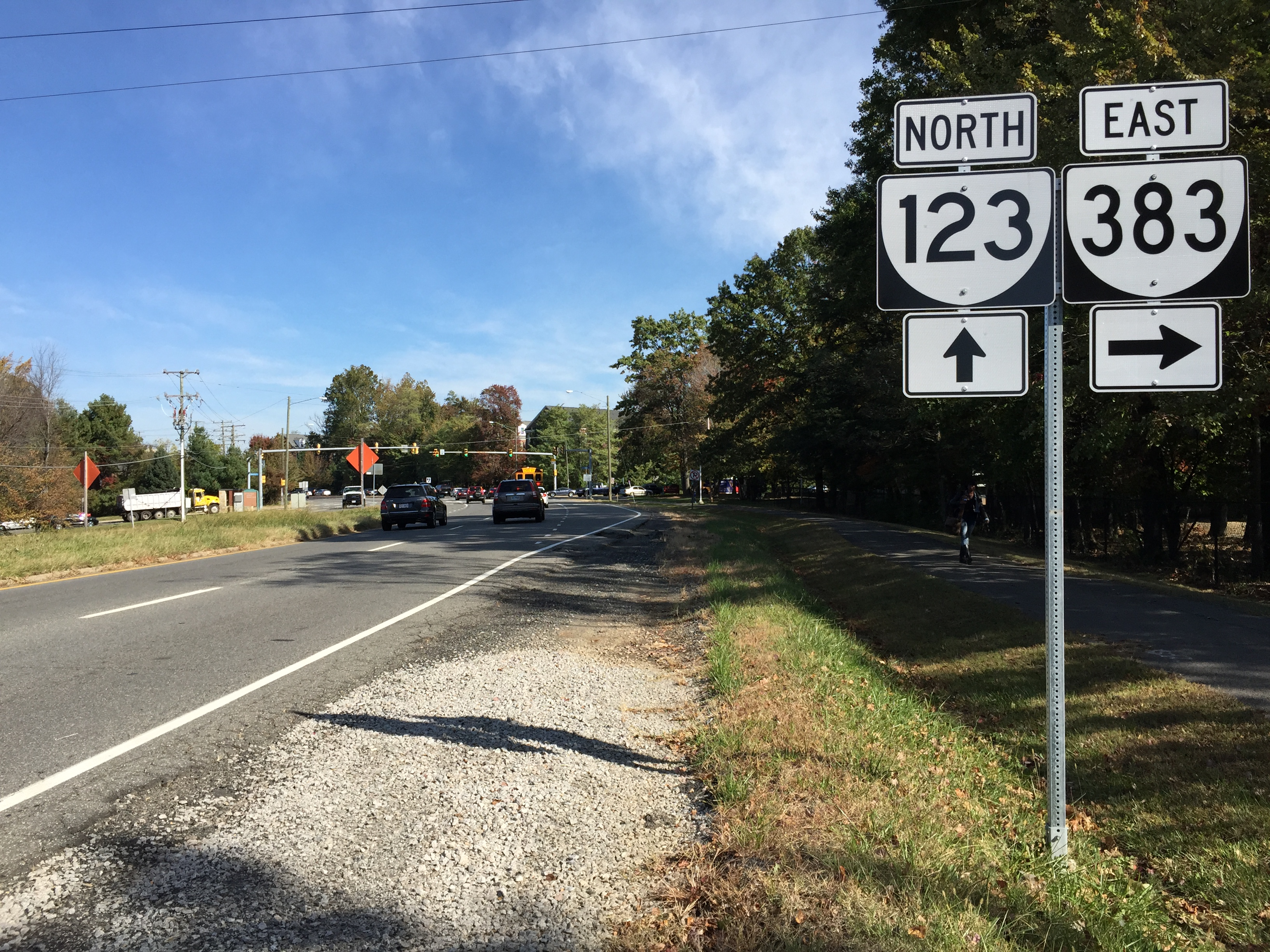
Signage for SR 383 on SR 123 at George Mason University in Fairfax County

State Route 383 is the designation for University Drive, the entrance road into George Mason University, Fairfax Campus in Fairfax County that is maintained by the Virginia Department of Transportation. The western terminus for this road is SR 123, Ox Road. The road was added to the state highway system in 1964.

== SR 384 ==
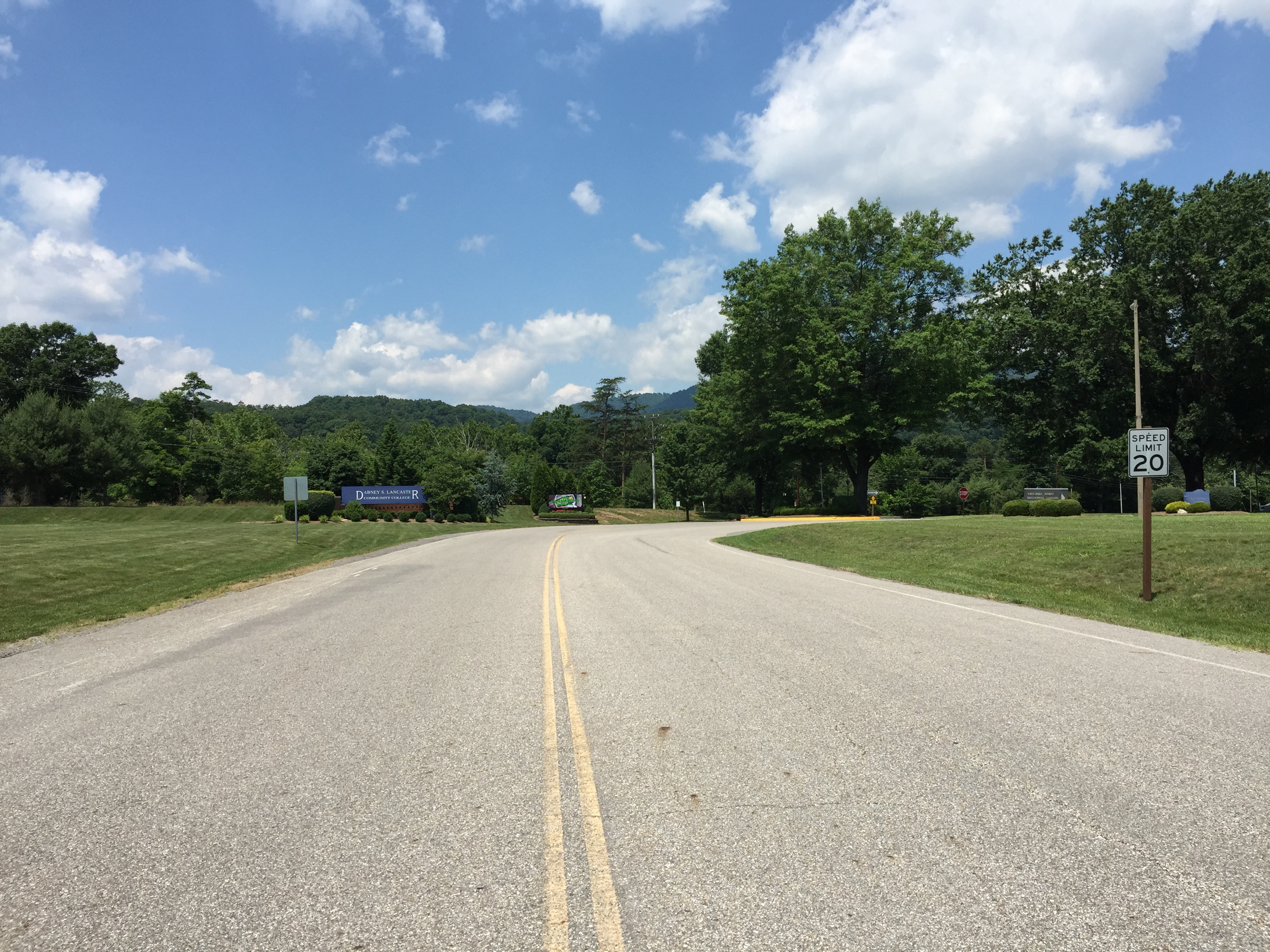
SR 384, the entrance from US 60 Bus./US 220 Bus. to Mountain Gateway Community College north of Selma

State Route 384 is the unsigned designation for Dabney Drive, the entrance and circle within Mountain Gateway Community College in Alleghany County that is maintained by the Virginia Department of Transportation. The eastern terminus for this road is I-64/US 60/US 220, and leads directly onto US 60 Business/US 220 Business. This college entrance is the only one to have direct access to an Interstate highway in Virginia. The road was added to the state highway system in 1965.

== SR 385 ==
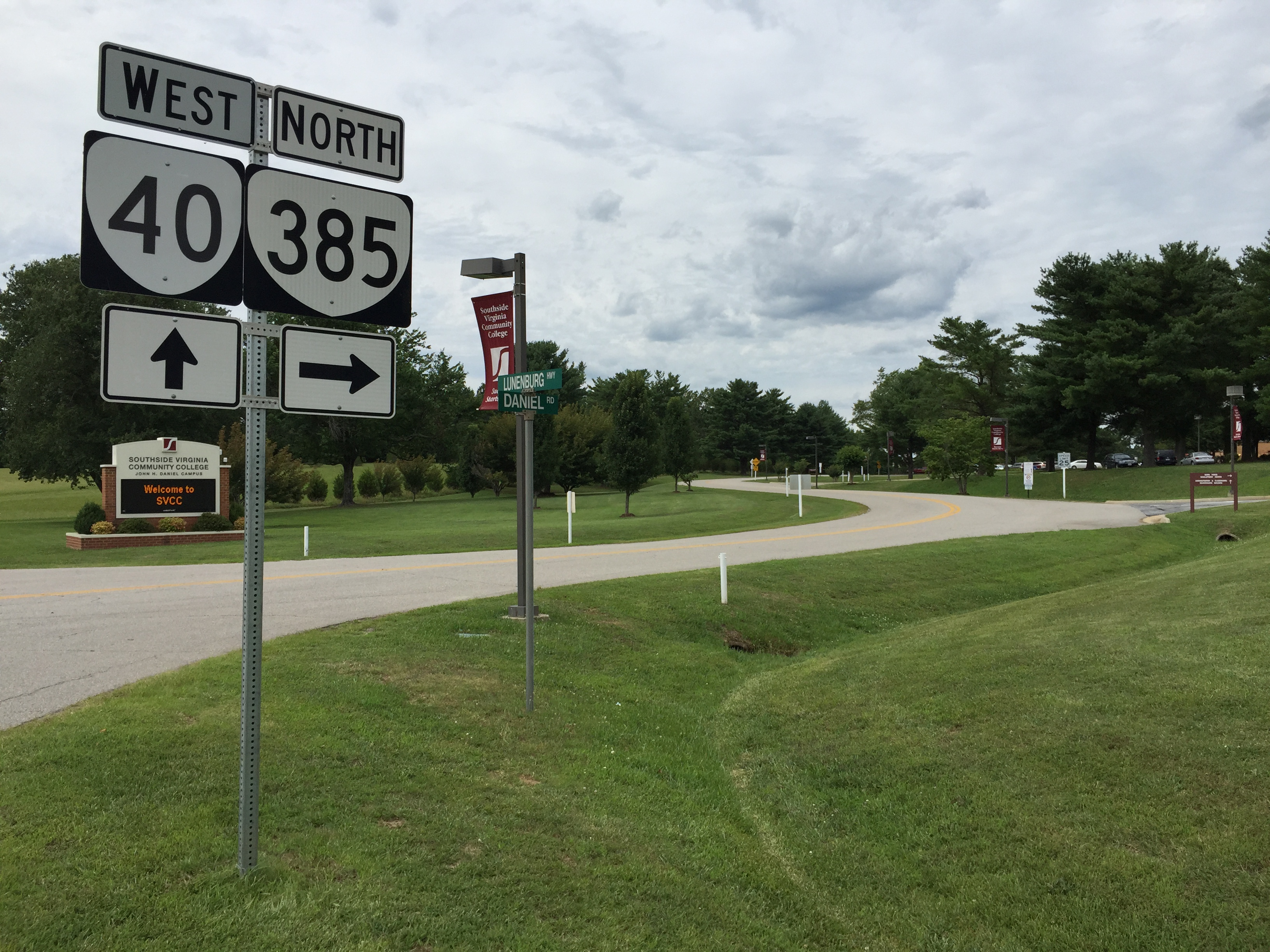
View north at the south end of SR 385 at SR 40 at Southside Virginia Community College, John H. Daniel Campus east of Keysville

State Route 385 is the designation for Daniel Road, the entrance and main road within Southside Virginia Community College, John H. Daniel Campus in Charlotte County that is maintained by the Virginia Department of Transportation. The southern terminus for this road is SR 40. The road was added to the state highway system about 1970, when the campus was created.

== SR 386 (former) ==
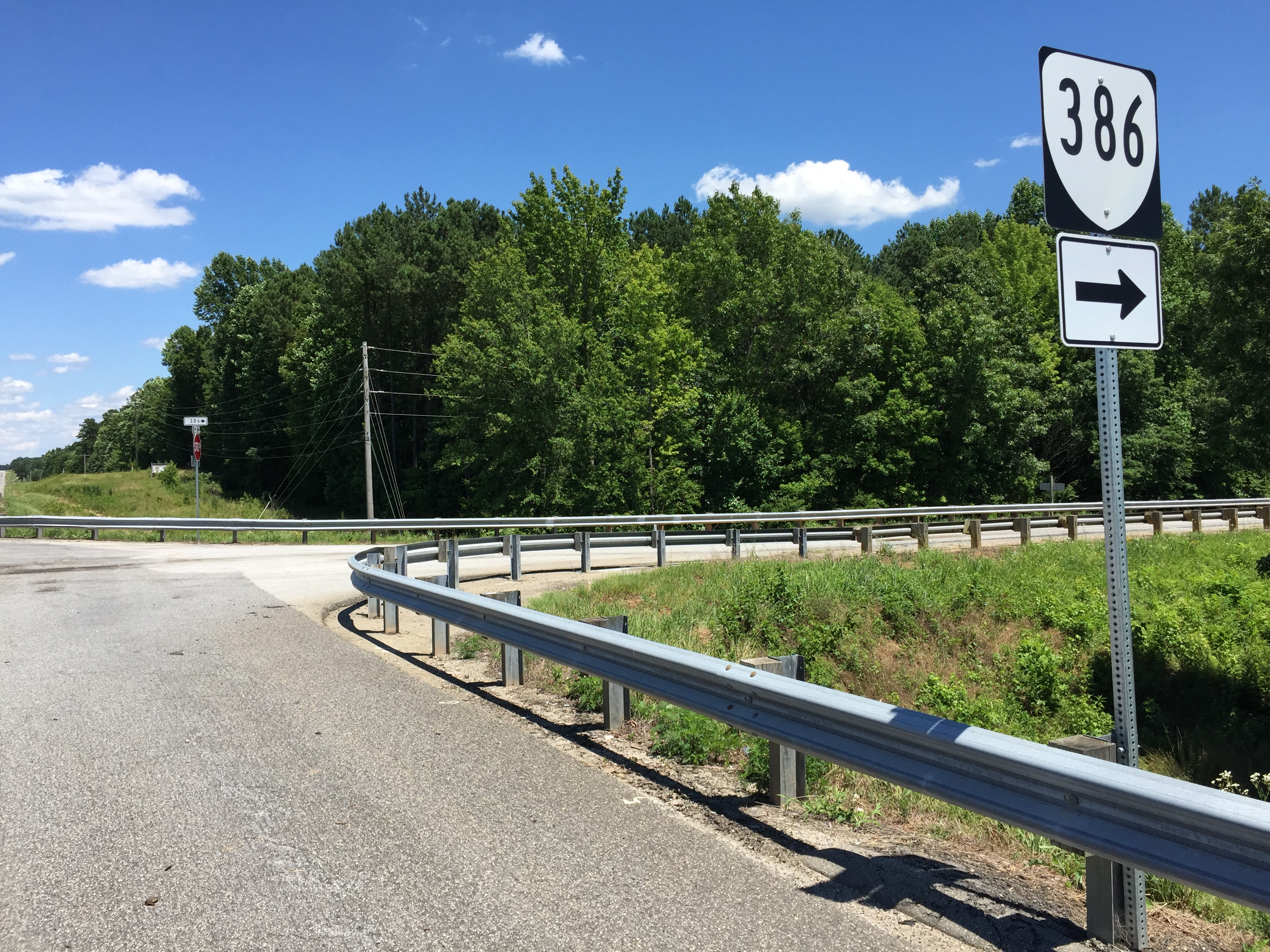
The north end of SR 386 at US 58 northeast of Boydton

State Route 386 was the designation for Prison Road, the entrance to Mecklenburg Correctional Center in Mecklenburg County that was maintained by the Virginia Department of Transportation. The northern terminus for this road was US 58. The road was added to the state highway system about 1976, when the facility was opened. The facility was closed in 2012 and torn down in 2017. The road was decommissioned in October 2019. The road has been since been designated as secondary route 883 and renamed as Herbert Drive.

== SR 387 ==
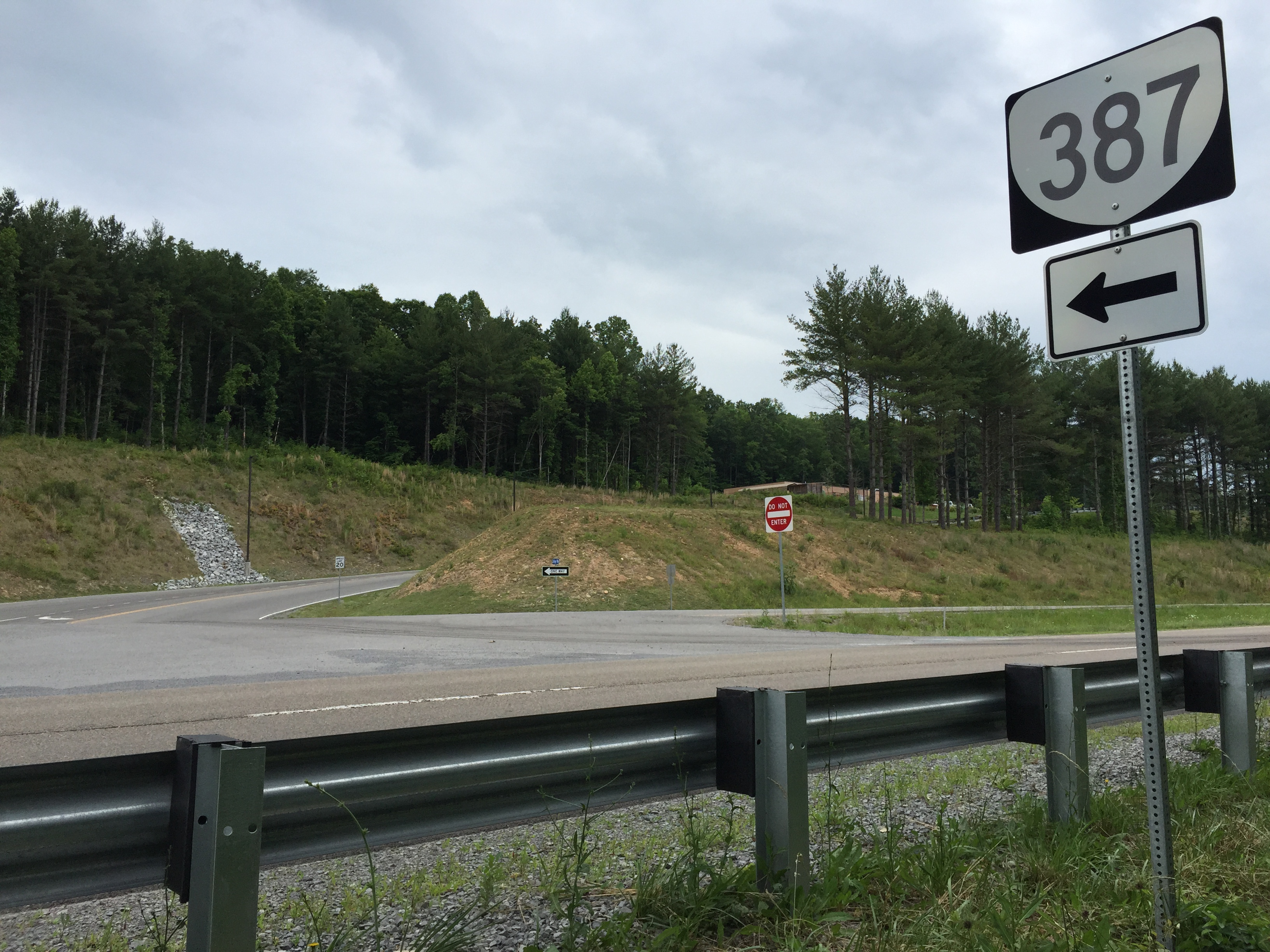
SR 387, the entrance from US 23/US 58 Alt. to Mountain Empire Community College in Irondale

State Route 387 is the designation for Mountain Empire Road, the entrance to and main road within Mountain Empire Community College in Wise County that is maintained by the Virginia Department of Transportation. The eastern terminus for this road is US 23. The road was added to the state highway system in 1974.

== SR 388 ==
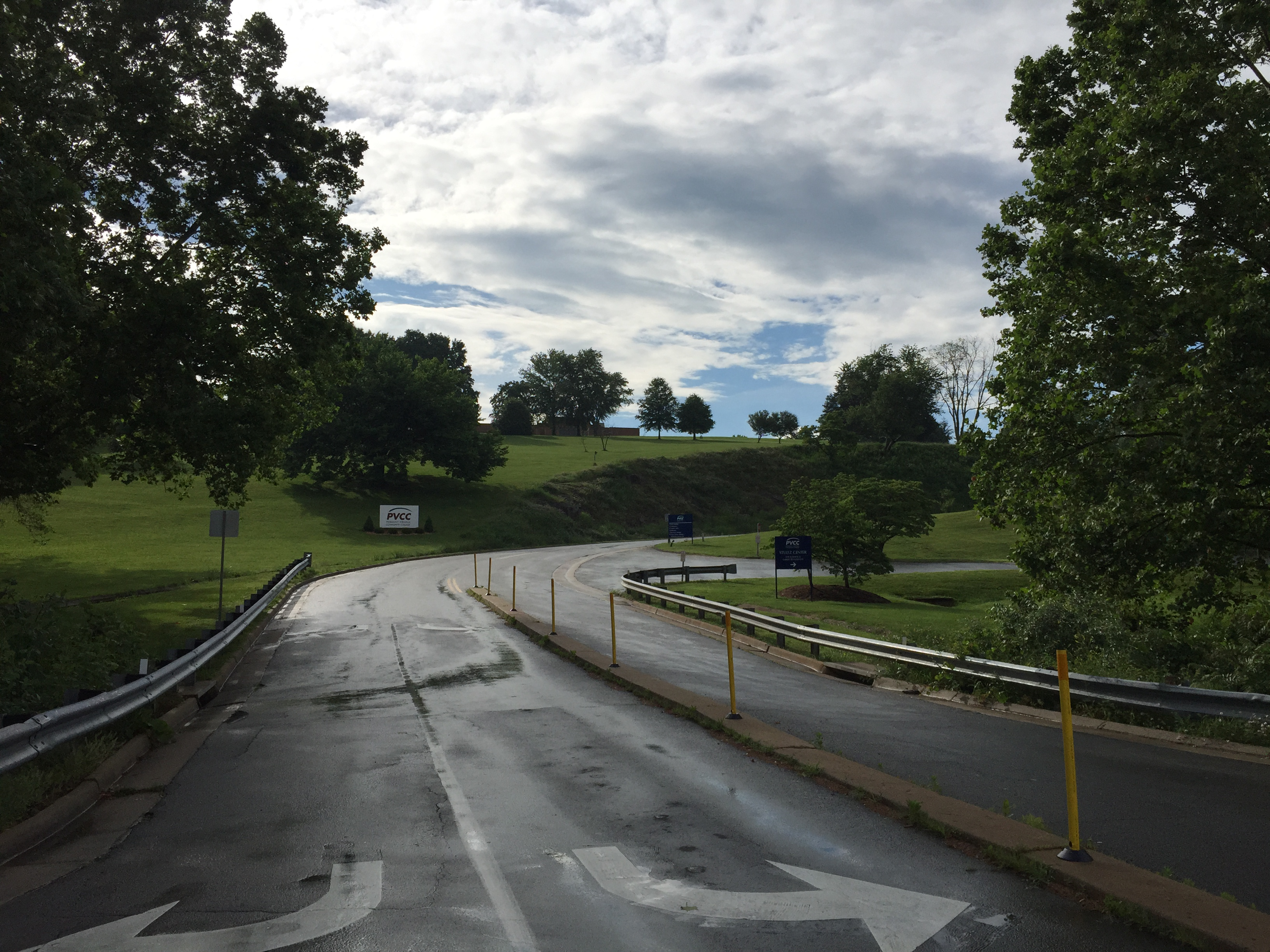
View west from the east end of SR 388 at SR 20 south of Charlottesville

State Route 388 is the designation for the entrance to and main road within Piedmont Virginia Community College in Albemarle County that is maintained by the Virginia Department of Transportation. The eastern terminus for this road is SR 20. The road was added to the state highway system in 1974.

== SR 389 ==
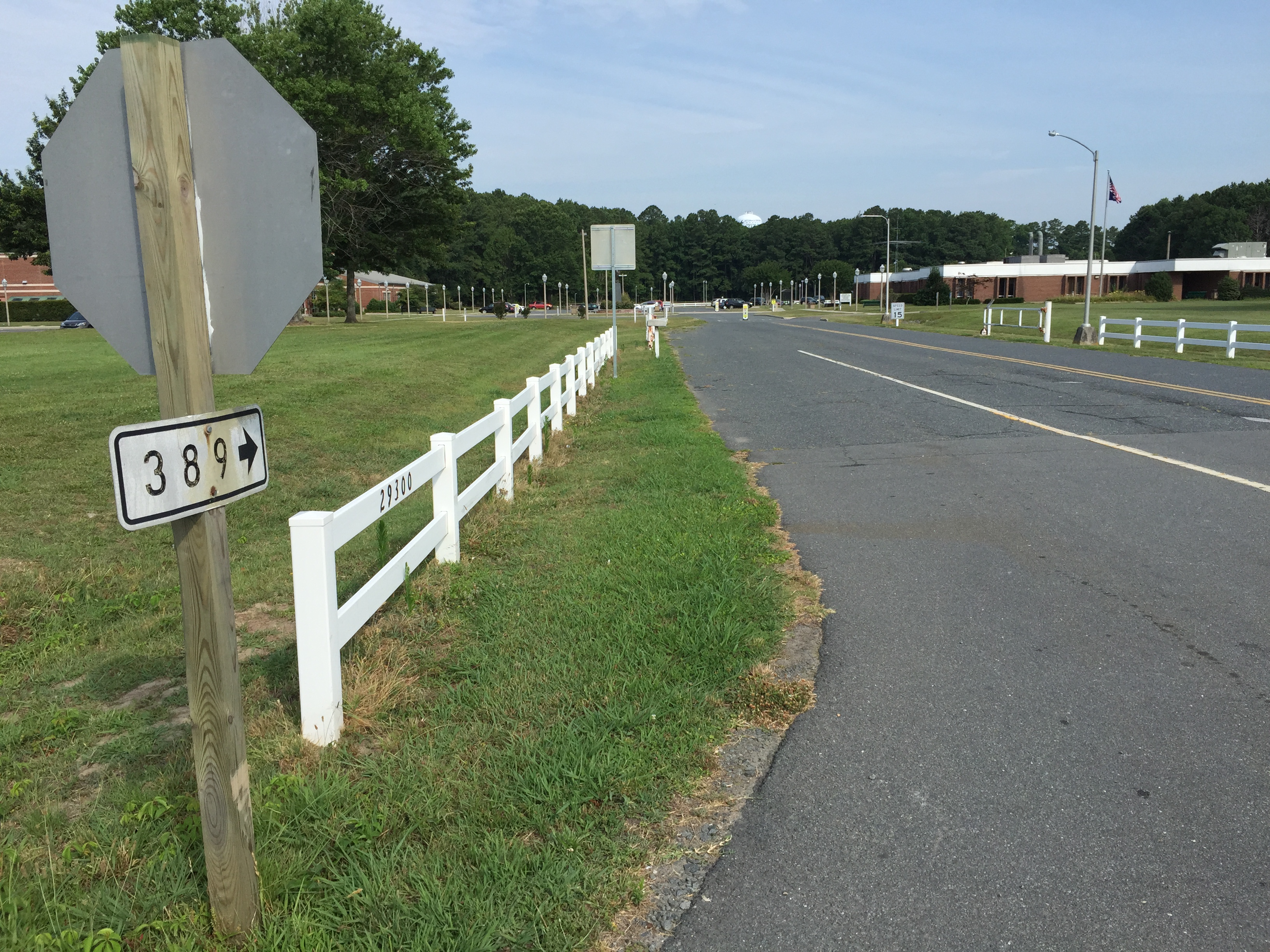
SR 389, the entrance from US 13 to Eastern Shore Community College in Melfa

State Route 389 is the designation for the entrance to Eastern Shore Community College, Melfa Campus in Accomac County that is maintained by the Virginia Department of Transportation. The eastern terminus for this road is US 13. The road was added to the state highway system about 1975.

== SR 390 ==
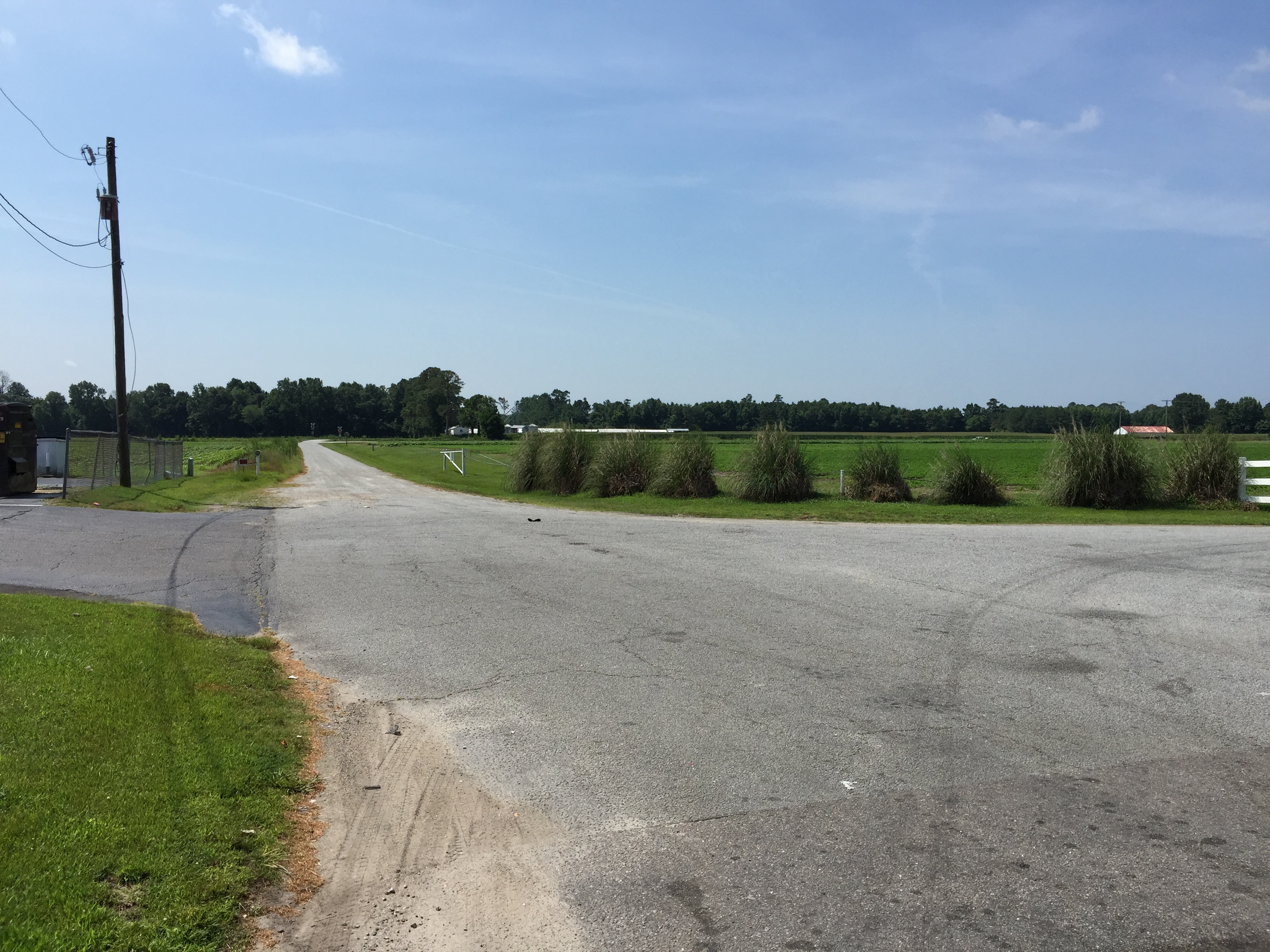
SR 390, the entrance from US 58 to the Virginia Tech, Tidewater Research and Continuing Education Center in Suffolk

State Route 390 is the designation for the entrance into Virginia Tech, Tidewater Research and Continuing Education Center in the City of Suffolk. The road was added to the state highway system in 1978. The outside terminus is US 58.

== SR 391 ==
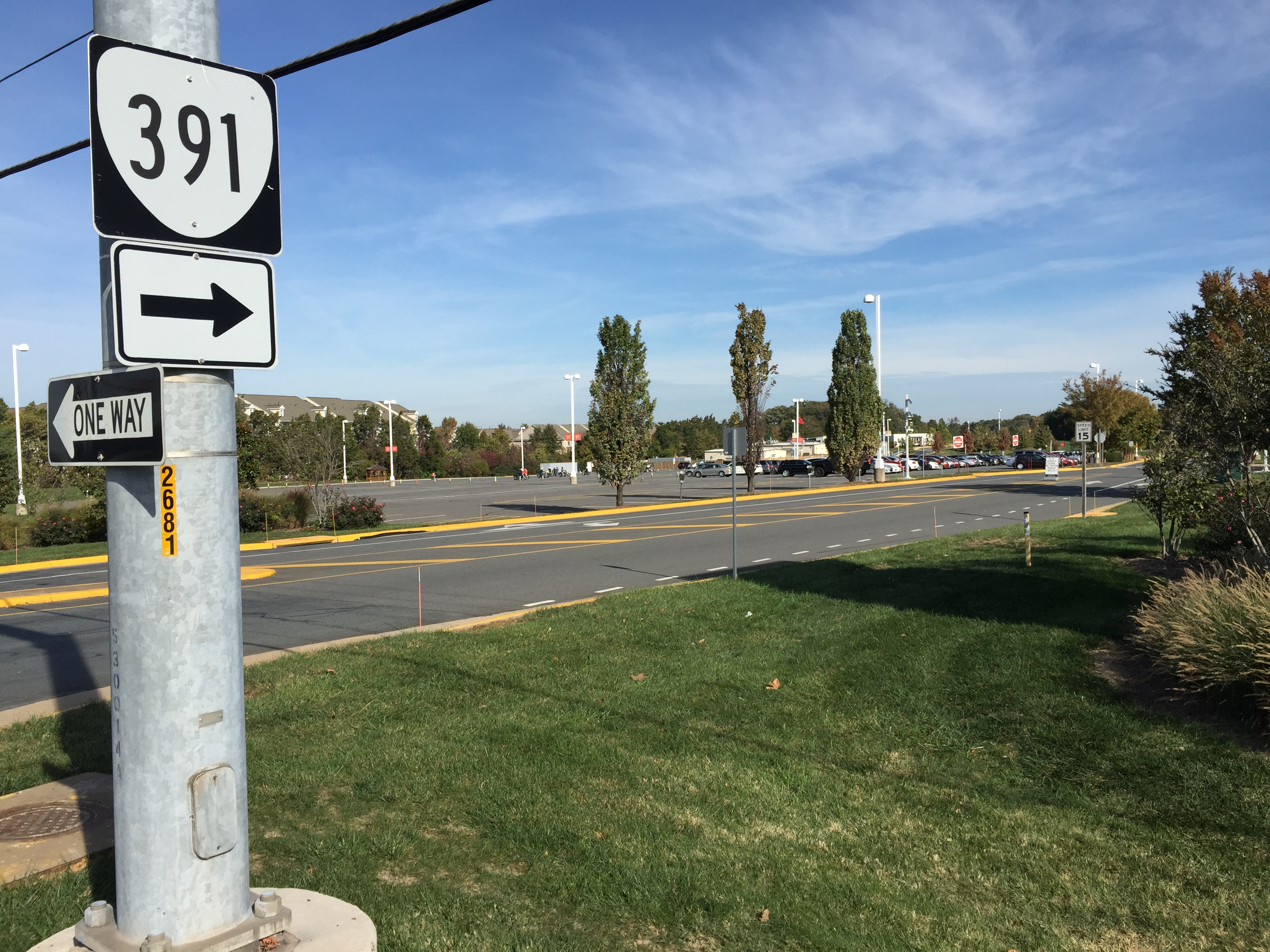
View north from the south end of SR 391 at SR 7 at the Northern Virginia Community College, Loudoun Campus in Loudoun County

State Route 391 is the designation for Campus Drive, the entrance to Northern Virginia Community College, Loudoun Campus in Loudoun County that is maintained by the Virginia Department of Transportation. The southern terminus for this road is SR 7. The road was added to the state highway system about 1976.

== SR 392 (former) ==
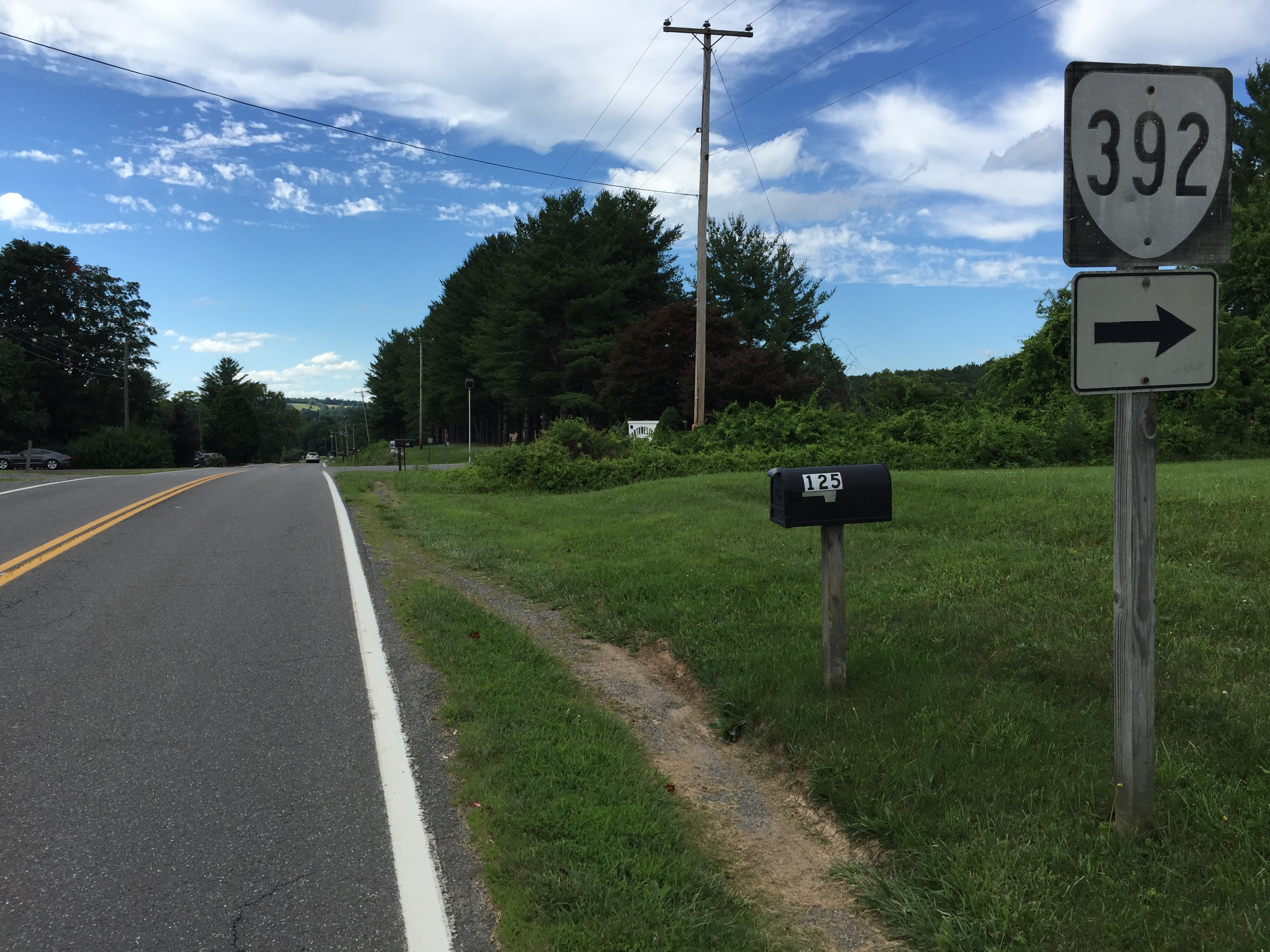
Sign for SR 392 along SR 958 (Training Center Road) at the Southwestern Virginia Training Center in Woodlawn

State Route 392 was the designation for Harrison Circle, the entrance to and main road in Southwestern Virginia Training Center in Carroll County that was maintained by the Virginia Department of Transportation. The western terminus for this road was SR 707 near US 58. The road was added to the state highway system about 1976. The Southwestern Virginia Training Center closed in August 2018, and the road was deleted from the state highway system in July 2022.

== SR 393 ==
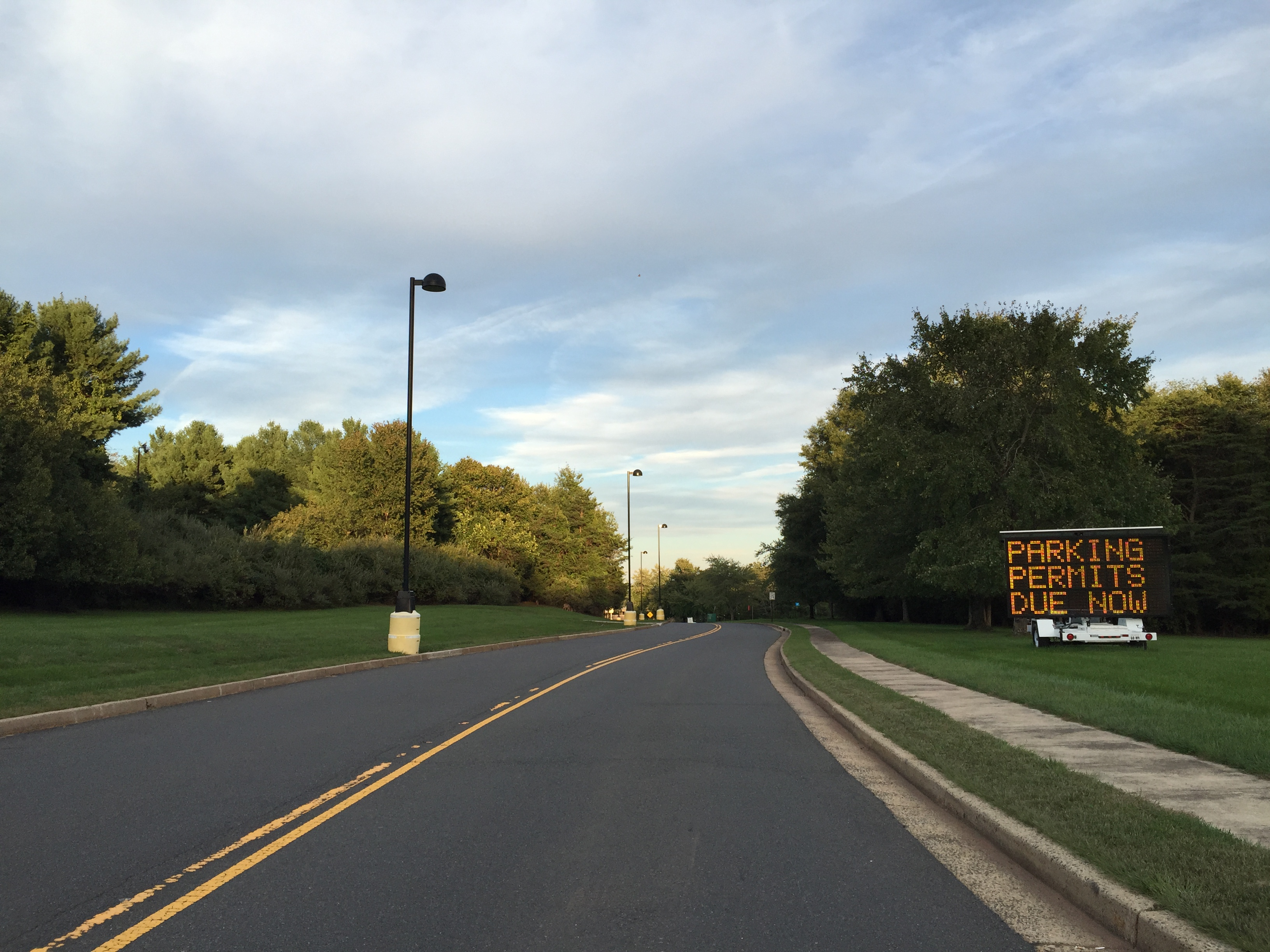
View east at the west end of SR 393 at SR 234 at the Northern Virginia Community College, Manassas Campus in Prince William County

State Route 393 is the designation for the entrance to Northern Virginia Community College, Manassas Campus in Prince William County that is maintained by the Virginia Department of Transportation. The western terminus for this road is SR 234, Sudley Road. The road was added to the state highway system about 1976.

== SR 394 ==
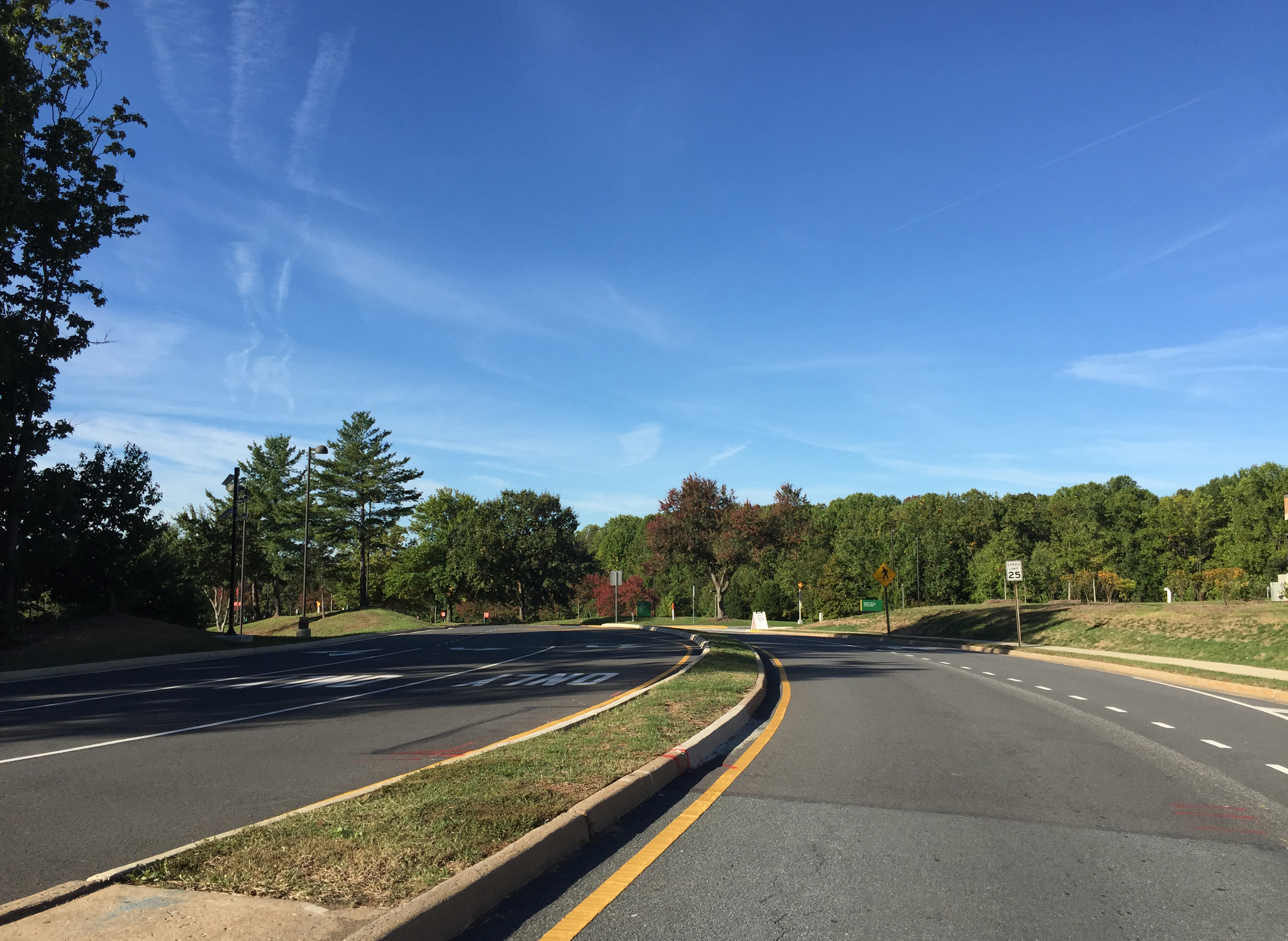
View south at the north end of SR 394 at SR 642 at the Northern Virginia Community College, Woodbridge Campus in Neabsco

State Route 394 is the designation for College Drive, the entrance to Northern Virginia Community College, Woodbridge Campus in Prince William County that is maintained by the Virginia Department of Transportation. The northern and southern termini of this road are SR 638 (Neabsco Mills Road). The road was added to the state highway system about 1977.

== SR 396 ==
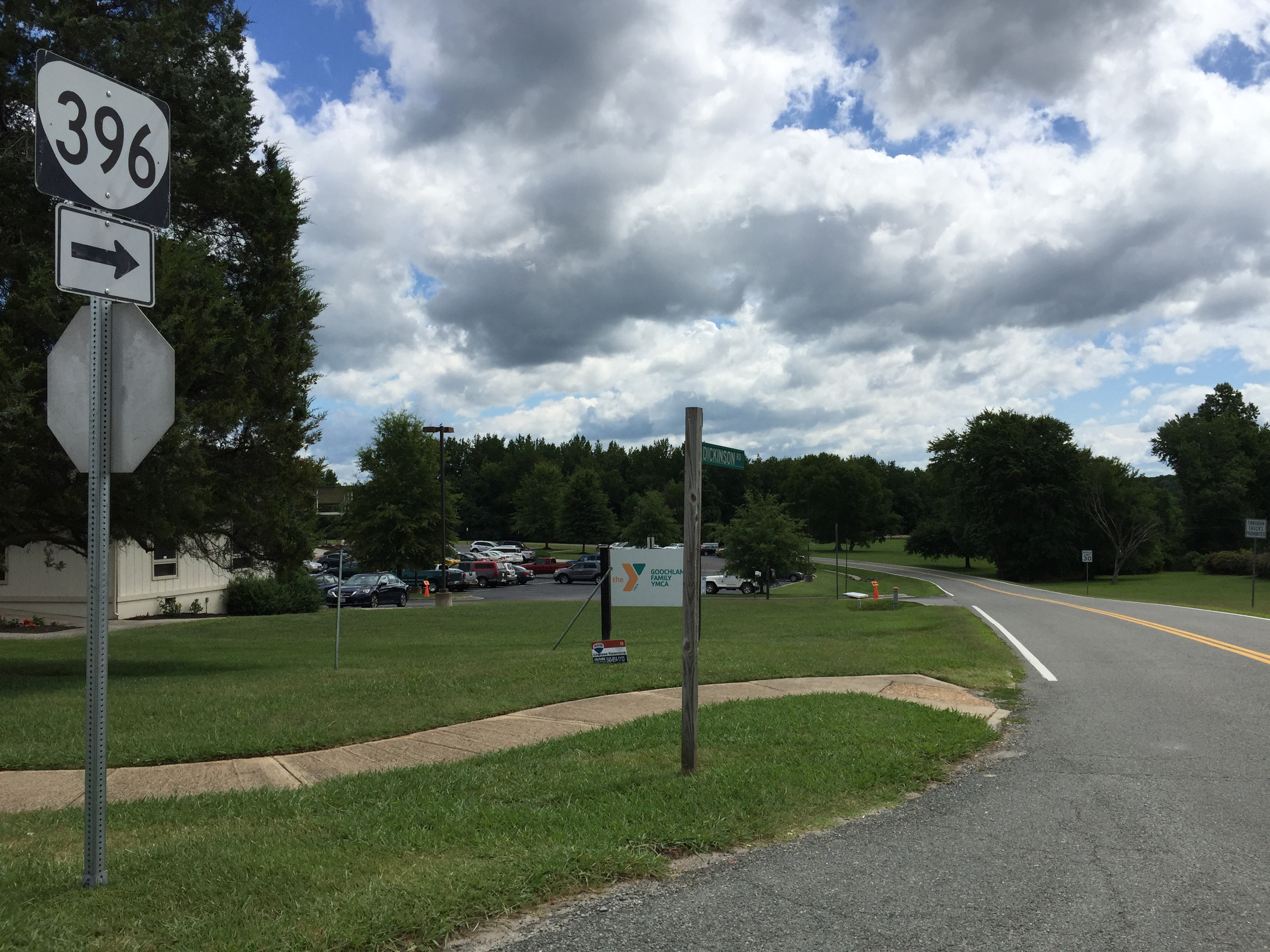
The south end of SR 396 at US 522/SR 6 in Goochland

State Route 396 is the designation for Dickinson Road, the main road through J. Sargeant Reynolds Community College, Western Campus in Goochland County that is maintained by the Virginia Department of Transportation. The western terminus for this road is US 522 / SR 6, and the northern terminus is SR 632 (Fairground Road). The road was added to the state highway system about 1978.

== SR 397 ==
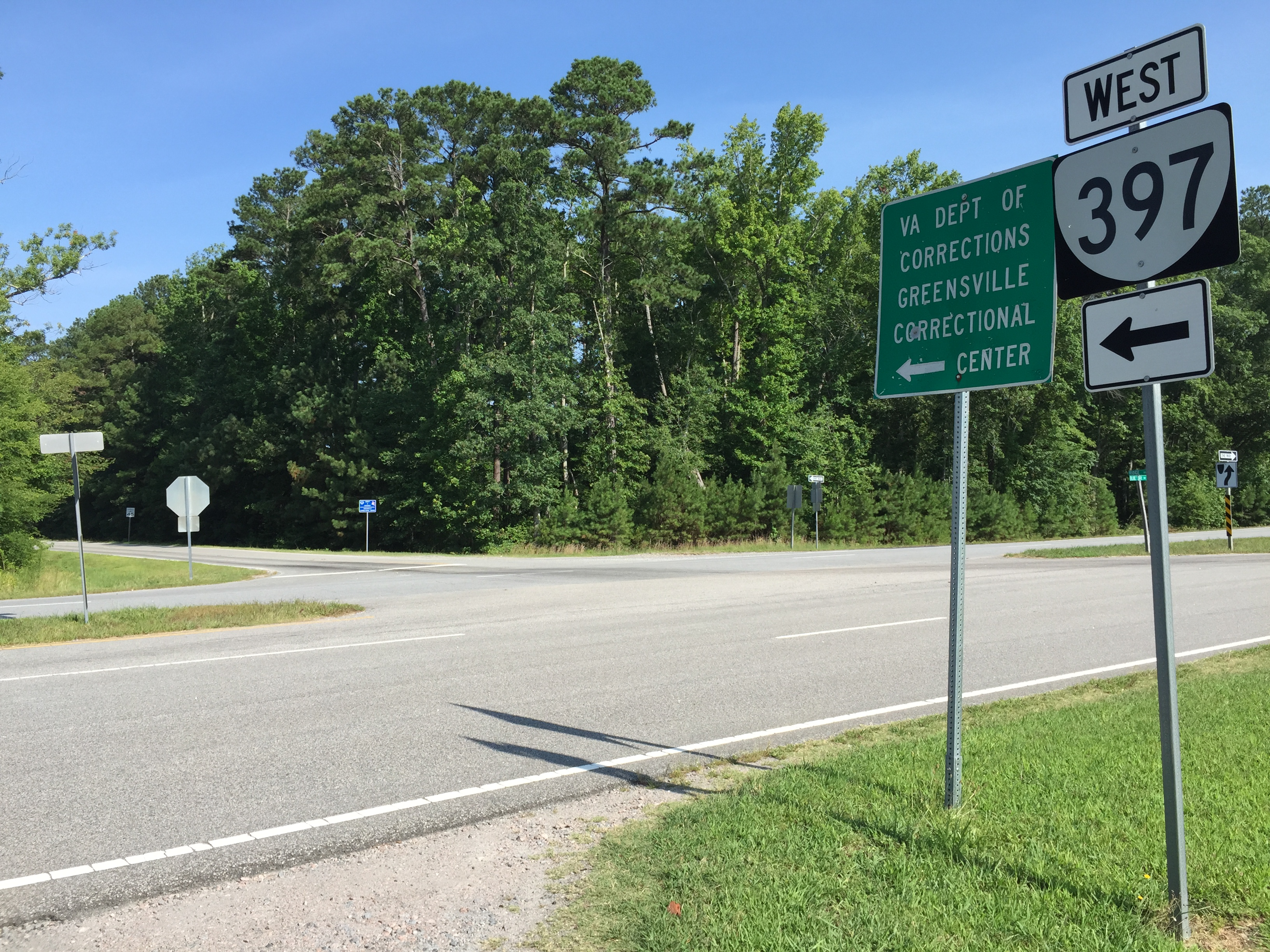
View west at the east end of SR 397 at US 301 south of Jarratt

State Route 397 is the designation for Ridge Road (Sussex County) and Correction Way (Greensville County), the entrance into the Greensville Correctional Center in Greensville County and Sussex County that is maintained by the Virginia Department of Transportation. The eastern terminus for this road is US 301 in Sussex County. The road was added to the state highway system in 1990.

== SR 398 ==
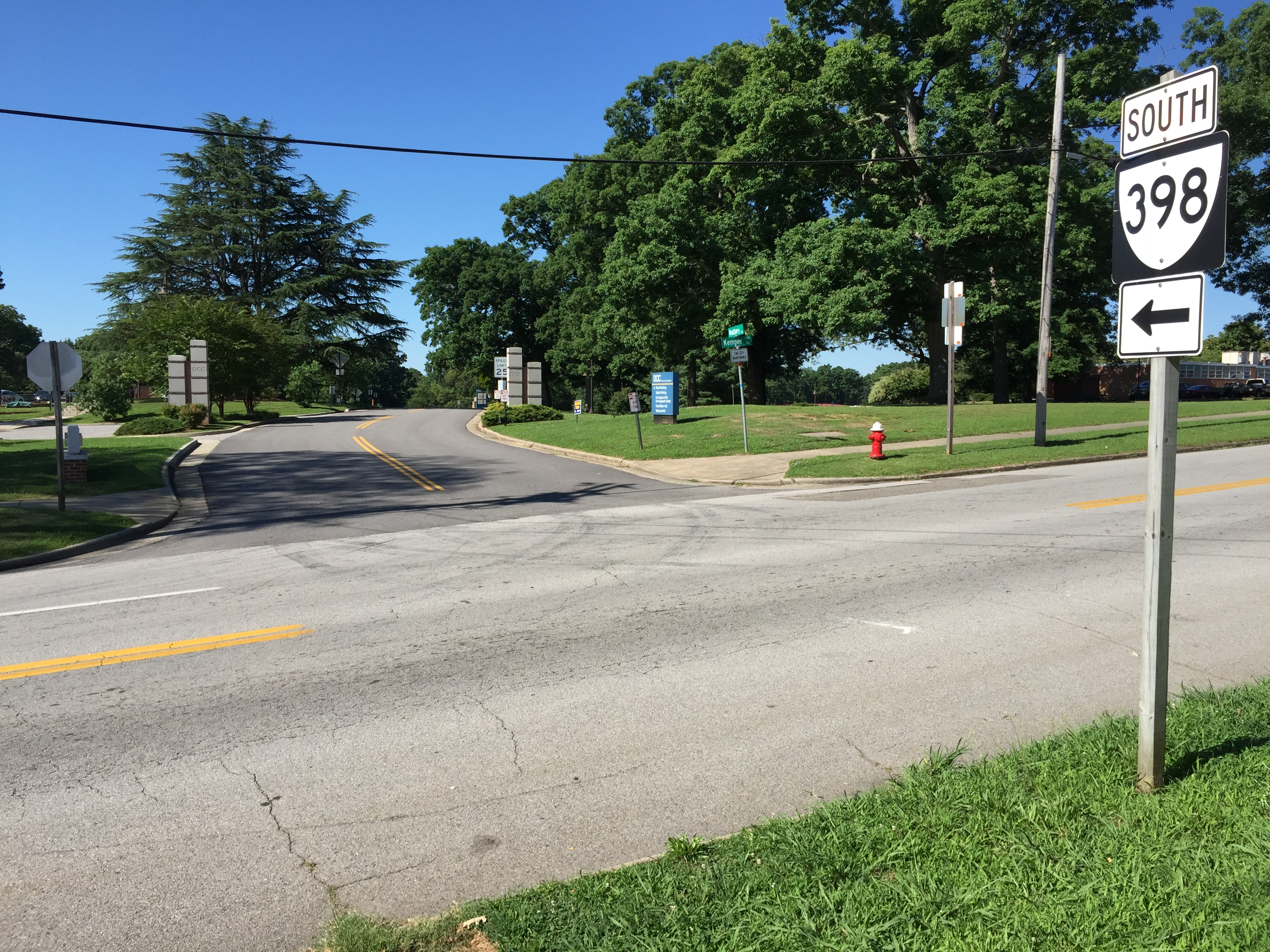
SR 398, the main road through Danville Community College in Danville

State Route 398 is the designation for Neathery Lane, the main road through Danville Community College in the City of Danville that is maintained by the Virginia Department of Transportation. The road connects Kemper Road and College Park Drive. It was added to the state highway system about 1967.

== SR 399 ==
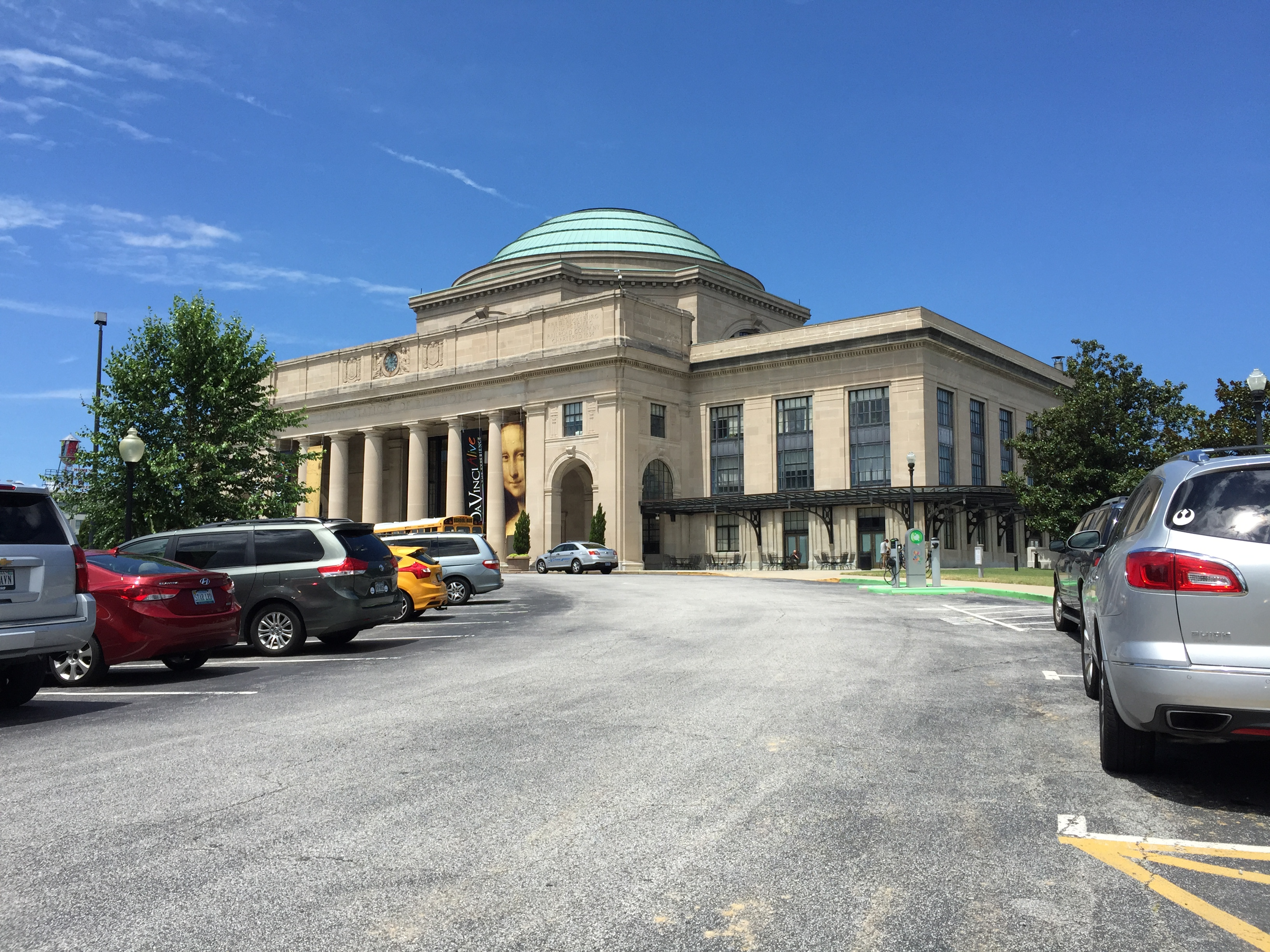
SR 399, the entrance loop from US 33/US 250 to the Science Museum of Virginia in Richmond

State Route 399 is the designation for the entrance loop into the Science Museum of Virginia in the City of Richmond that is maintained by the Virginia Department of Transportation. The southern terminus for this road is US 33 / US 250 (Broad Street). The road was added to the state highway system in about 1980. The road is one way, from east to west.
