= WPLY (Roanoke, Virginia) =

- Roanoke, Virginia; United States
- Broadcast area: Southwest Virginia; New River Valley
- Frequency: 610 kHz

Ownership
- Owner: Mel Wheeler, Inc.
- Sister stations: WFIR; WPLI; WSLC-FM; WSLQ; WVBB; WVBE-FM; WXLK; WZZU

History
- First air date: October 1, 1940
- Last air date: September 30, 2025
- Former call signs: WSLS (1940–1972); WSLC (1972–2002); WVBE (2002–2016); WPLY (2016–2025); WPLI (2025–2026)
- Call sign meaning: Play

Technical information
- Licensing authority: FCC
- Facility ID: 41111
- Class: B
- Power: 5,000 watts (day); 1,000 watts (night)
- Transmitter coordinates: 37°18′14.5″N 80°2′30.1″W
- Translator: 101.1 W266CY (Roanoke)

Links
- Public license information: Public file; LMS

WPLY (610 AM) was a commercial radio station licensed to Roanoke, Virginia, United States, and serving Southwest Virginia and the New River Valley. Prior to going silent on September 30, 2025, WPLY had simulcast a sports format with WPLI (1390 AM) in Lynchburg; the license was canceled in 2026 as WPLI. It was owned by Mel Wheeler, Inc.

WPLY's transmitter was at the end of Newman Drive in Salem. Programming was also relayed on low-power FM translator W266CY at 101.1 MHz in Roanoke.

== History ==
Just before noon on October 1, 1940, the station signed on as WSLS. WSLS was an affiliate of the NBC Blue Network, which later became ABC. A partner FM station, WSLS-FM 99.1, launched in 1947, largely simulcasting the AM station. WSLS-TV (channel 10) followed five years later.

As network programming moved from radio to television, WSLS switched to a full service, Country music format. In 1969, Park Communications purchased WSLS-AM-FM-TV. Due to Federal Communications Commission ownership restrictions, Park kept the television station and sold the radio stations to Bass Brothers Telecasters. As the stations could no longer share a call sign after the purchase, the AM became WSLC at midnight on August 1, 1972, keeping its country sound. The FM switched to album-oriented rock and briefly became WSLC-FM before settling on current call sign WSLQ. Only the TV station still carries the WSLS call letters. Mel Wheeler purchased the two stations in 1976.

At noon on May 25, 2000, WSLC began simulcasting with WSLC-FM 94.9, formerly easy listening turned classic rock station WPVR, after that station was purchased by Mel Wheeler Inc. This continued until March 13, 2002, when the country format moved full-time to WSLC-FM. WSLC AM was flipped to new call letters as WVBE, simulcasting co-owned WVBE-FM 100.1 from Lynchburg, and brought urban adult contemporary and R&B music full-time to Roanoke.

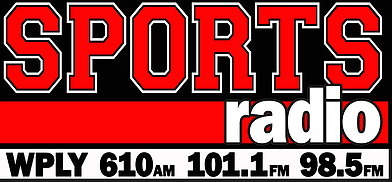
Former logo

On January 20, 2016, the station dropped its urban AC format for sports talk with the new call sign WPLY. The station became an affiliate of Fox Sports Radio.

On September 30, 2025, WPLY ceased operations. Its sports format continues on WXLK's HD3 subchannel and translator W266CY 101.1 FM Roanoke (which now simulcasts WXLK-HD3). WPLY and WPLI (1390 AM) concurrently swapped call letters, while Mel Wheeler, Inc. explored the possibility of selling off or donating the 610 AM facility.

A silent station has one year to resume operations or its license is automatically forfeited under a provision of the Telecommunications Act of 1996. Mel Wheeler, Inc. surrendered WPLI's license on the deadline day of September 30, 2026. It was cancelled on October 1. The station's towers in Salem had been demolished on September 14 so that the property could be redeveloped.
