= WFXR =

Television station in Roanoke, Virginia

- Roanoke–Lynchburg, Virginia; United States
- City: Roanoke, Virginia
- Channels: Digital: 36 (UHF); Virtual: 27
- Branding: WFXR

Programming
- Affiliations: 27.1: Fox; 27.2: The CW; for others, see § Subchannels

Ownership
- Owner: Nexstar Media Group; (Nexstar Media Inc.)
- Sister stations: WWCW

History
- Founded: January 25, 1983
- First air date: November 13, 1986
- Former call signs: WVFT (1986–1993); WFXR-TV (1993–2009)
- Former channel numbers: Analog: 27 (UHF, 1986–2009); Digital: 17 (UHF, 2005–2019)
- Former affiliations: Independent (1986–1990); The WB (secondary, 1999–2001 and 2002–2006) (Note: The WB was aired on the main channel from 1999 to 2001, when local cable channel "WBVA" was launched. This was then added as a subchannel to both stations beginning in 2002.)
- Call sign meaning: "Fox Roanoke"

Technical information
- Licensing authority: FCC
- Facility ID: 24813
- ERP: 944 kW
- HAAT: 607.3 m (1,992 ft)
- Transmitter coordinates: 37°11′47.8″N 80°9′14.6″W
- Repeater: WWCW 21.2 Lynchburg

Links
- Public license information: Public file; LMS
- Website: www.wfxrtv.com

WFXR (channel 27) is a television station licensed to Roanoke, Virginia, United States, serving as the Fox affiliate for the Roanoke–Lynchburg market. It is owned by Nexstar Media Group alongside Lynchburg-licensed CW station WWCW (channel 21). The two stations share studios at the Valleypointe office park on Valleypoint Parkway in northeastern Roanoke County; WFXR's transmitter is located on Poor Mountain in southwestern Roanoke County. WWCW broadcasts WFXR's Fox programming from its transmitter on Thaxton Mountain in Bedford County as one of its subchannels and vice versa.

WFXR is the third station to occupy channel 27 in Roanoke. After seven years of battles over the permit and construction, it began broadcasting on November 13, 1986, as WVFT, the market's second new general-entertainment independent station in twelve months. The market proved unable to bear both WVFT and WJPR (channel 21), which had gone on the air earlier that year, due to insufficient advertising revenue and signal issues; in April 1989, the station's owner, Family Group Broadcasting, filed for bankruptcy protection. In 1990, Henry A. Ash of Tampa, Florida, acquired both stations out of bankruptcy, receiving a federal waiver to own the combination. On August 20, 1990, they began simulcasting as "Fox 21/27", the Fox affiliate for the market; WJPR had been airing Fox programming since October 1986.

WVFT and WJPR were acquired in 1993 by Grant Communications, and WVFT changed its call sign to WFXR-TV. Under Grant, the stations began airing a local newscast produced by WSLS-TV and also acquired The WB and later The CW affiliation in the market, which was initially aired in overnight hours and then on a local cable channel. With the conversion to digital broadcasting, the Fox and CW services were broadcast as subchannels in both Roanoke and Lynchburg, with channel 21 recognized as the originating station for The CW. Nexstar acquired WFXR and WWCW in 2013 and moved them into new, larger studios two years later, allowing them to begin producing their own news programming.

== Early history of channel 27 in Roanoke ==
Ultra high frequency (UHF) channel 27 in Roanoke was originally occupied by WROV-TV, which operated for less than five months from March 2 to July 18, 1953. It was the first UHF television station in the United States to cease operation. Southwestern Virginia is very mountainous, hindering adequate UHF reception. Further, nationally, UHF stations faced economic difficulties because not all television sets were manufactured with built-in UHF tuners, which did not change until the All-Channel Receiver Act came into force in 1964. After WROV's owners sought channel 7, as part of a settlement with the Times-World Corporation, that company acquired WROV-TV's physical assets in exchange for approval to build channel 7 as WDBJ-TV.

Later occupying the channel 27 frequency was WRFT-TV/WRLU, which operated as the market's secondary ABC affiliate from 1966 to 1974 and again from 1974 to 1975. At the time, the area's primary ABC affiliate, WLVA-TV (channel 13, now WSET-TV) in Lynchburg, provided only marginal signal coverage in Roanoke.

== History ==
=== Construction battle ===
Interest around the use of channel 27 at Roanoke emerged again in the late 1970s and coalesced around two groups. The first group to express its interest was Roanoke Christian Broadcasting (RCB), which proposed a Christian station. By June, three groups sought the channel: RCB, a second Christian group, and a consortium of businessmen known as Western Virginia Television Corporation (WVTC).

The entrance of WVTC into the latter caused two Christian groups—RCB and the Evangel Foursquare Church—to unite their efforts. RCB and WVTC, the only two channel 27 applicants, fought not only in comparative hearing at the Federal Communications Commission (FCC) but in Virginia courts, where WVTC alleged that RCB had plagiarized engineering data from its application. Evangel Foursquare had separated from RCB by 1981, when the FCC approved the addition of channel 38 to Roanoke, which would eventually be used by its WEFC beginning in January 1986.

In June 1982, an FCC administrative law judge released an initial decision in favor of Roanoke Christian Broadcasting, with the primary deciding factor being the larger overlap of ownership and management in the RCB bid. WVTC protested to the FCC Review Board, which upheld the initial decision; meanwhile, the plagiarism lawsuit was dismissed after a judge ruled insufficient evidence was presented, even though RCB admitted to copying nine pages of what it described as public domain engineering information. The FCC's commissioners affirmed the permit grant to RCB in March 1984.

=== WVFT: The Family Group years ===
Two years passed without activity on the channel. In March 1986, in an effort to get the station on air and citing the appeals from the original decision that had kept away investors, Roanoke Christian Broadcasting sold the permit to a partnership in which it owned five percent and the remainder was held by Family Group Broadcasting, a chain of independent stations based in Tampa, Florida. Family Group began fitting out studios on Colonial Avenue Southwest in the Franklin-Colonial area of Roanoke, and the call letters WVFT (for "Western Virginia Family Television") were adopted.

After delays in constructing its transmitter facility, WVFT began broadcasting on November 13, 1986, as the second independent in the Roanoke–Lynchburg market. Its primary competitor was WJPR (channel 21) in Lynchburg, which had gone on the air that March. After signing on, the station was sued by WVTF, a Roanoke public radio station owned by the Virginia Tech Foundation, which feared some donors might send their contributions to WVFT instead of WVTF. A federal judge found in the television station's favor, and the suit was eventually dropped.

WVFT's financial condition began to show signs of stress in late 1988, as neither it nor WJPR was able to find sufficient advertising revenue. It was apparent that the Roanoke–Lynchburg market was not large enough to sustain what were essentially two independent stations; WJPR, like many early Fox affiliates, was mostly programmed as an independent. In December, the city of Roanoke sued WVFT seeking nearly $47,000 in unpaid property taxes for a two-year period. The company attempted to sell WVFT along with two operating Wisconsin stations—WGBA-TV in Green Bay and WLAX in La Crosse—and a third unbuilt Wisconsin station to Krypton Broadcasting in March 1989 in a package worth $10.5 million. Krypton, which touted its large film library, proposed to drive down programming costs at channel 27 by airing many of its own titles. However, that deal never closed. The subsidiaries of Family Group that held WVFT and the Wisconsin stations filed for Chapter 11 bankruptcy reorganization in April 1989. This made WVFT the second television station in the market to file for bankruptcy protection within six months, having been preceded in Chapter 11 by WJPR in November 1988.

=== Merger with WJPR ===
On September 13 and 15, 1989, bankruptcy courts in Lynchburg and Tampa, Florida, gave NewSouth Broadcasting, a company owned by Timothy Brumlik of Altamonte Springs, Florida, permission to purchase WJPR and WVFT with the intention of consolidating their programming. The deal began to fall apart on the 15th, however, when Brumlik was arrested on charges of laundering up to $12 million in Colombian drug money. Officials alleged that Brumlik's ownership of TeleOnce in Puerto Rico was a front for two important Latin American media men: Remigio Ángel González, reported to be a business partner with Manuel Noriega in a Panamanian television station, and Julio Vera Gutiérrez, a Peruvian citizen.

The indictment scrambled the picture for the stations Brumlik sought to buy. At the time of his arrest, he had been approved by bankruptcy courts or the FCC to buy WJPR and WVFT; WKCH-TV in Knoxville, Tennessee; and the then-unbuilt WGNM in Macon, Georgia. With regard to WJPR and WVFT, his arrest and indictment caused him to be unable to fulfill commitments required by the bankruptcy courts. Instead, Henry A. Ash, a Tampa life insurance broker, bid on both stations with the same goal: to combine them. Ash's Roanoke–Lynchburg TV Acquisition Corporation—with WJPR majority owner Thomas Carney as a stockholder—received court approval to buy both stations, paying $2.95 million for WJPR and $1.25 million for WVFT, in February 1990. It then filed with the FCC for a waiver of its rule that prohibited ownership of stations with overlapping signal coverage areas, believing that the market could bear one independent station but not two.

On August 20, 1990, with the purchases pending at the FCC, WVFT began simulcasting WJPR, expanding Fox network coverage to the market's western portions for the first time. FCC approval followed the next month. Key in winning approval was that adding channel 27 to channel 21 provided Fox service to an additional 213,000 people; the commission found it unlikely that the stations could exist separately given their financial problems and local terrain.

=== Grant ownership ===
On September 15, 1993, WVFT and WJPR were purchased by Grant Communications, owned by Milton Grant. The sale to Grant came after Carney and Ash opted to split their interests in Roanoke–Lynchburg TV Acquisition Corporation. In October 1993, WVFT had its call letters changed to WFXR-TV. Grant also upgraded the station's equipment, and the Fox network itself matured during the first years of Grant ownership.

WJPR–WFXR became a secondary affiliate of The WB in 1999, when the network ceased airing its programming on Superstation WGN nationally. Programs aired in overnight hours until February 1, 2001, when WJPR/WFXR launched a cable-only WB affiliate known as "WBVA-TV" and seen on Cox Communications channel 5. It was also announced at that time that "WBVA" would become a full-power service on channel 21 in May 2001, though instead it was broadcast as a subchannel from the WJPR transmitter beginning in April 2002. In 2006, when The WB and UPN merged into The CW, channels 21 and 27 obtained the rights to the affiliation in the market, with the cable channel going by "WCW5-TV" and the call letters on channel 21 changing to WWCW. As early as 2007, The CW was airing in high definition from the WWCW transmitter and in standard definition from the WFXR transmitter (and vice versa for Fox), ensuring coverage of both services in the Roanoke and Lynchburg areas.

=== Nexstar ownership ===
On November 6, 2013, the Irving, Texas–based Nexstar Broadcasting Group announced that it would purchase the Grant stations, including WFXR and WWCW, for $87.5 million. The sale was approved by the FCC on November 3, 2014, and was finalized one month later on December 1.

In March 2015, Joseph McNamara—who was appointed as vice president for the stations three months earlier in December 2014—announced that Nexstar planned to move WFXR/WWCW's operations and staff into a new, larger 14,830-square-foot (1,000 m^{2}) studio facility at the Valleypointe office park in northeastern Roanoke County, near Roanoke–Blacksburg Regional Airport. WFXR and WWCW migrated their operations into the new facility—which cost $3 million to build—during the week of September 14, 2015.

On January 27, 2016, Nexstar announced it would acquire Media General for $4.6 billion. Nexstar opted to retain WFXR and WWCW over Media General-owned WSLS-TV, which was divested to Graham Media Group.

== News operation ==
=== News share with WSLS-TV ===
In 1996, WJPR/WFXR entered into a news share agreement with NBC affiliate WSLS-TV, allowing that station to produce a 10 p.m. newscast for WJPR/WFXR. The agreement formally began when The Fox 10 O'Clock News premiered on October 28, 1996; the newscast originally aired for a half-hour five nights a week. WDBJ attempted to beat the two stations to the punch by launching News 7 Primetime on WEFC that September; that program was a ratings failure and lasted one year. Weekend editions of the 10 p.m. newscast were added in January 2000; the weeknight editions expanded to one hour in 2003. The program originated from a secondary set at the WSLS studios on 3rd Street in downtown Roanoke; WSLS-TV contributed one anchor, while the other was employed by Grant along with a producer. On March 12, 2012, WFXR launched a two-hour weekday morning newscast from 7 to 9 a.m.; the program was originally anchored by former WDBJ anchor Bob Grebe and Patrick McKee providing weather updates.

=== Start of in-house news operations ===
One reason for the studio relocation in 2015 was to bring news production in-house after 19 years. On September 17, 2015, WFXR announced that the news department would launch on October 1, with the expansion of its weekday morning news program—retitled Good Day Virginia—from two hours to four (with the premiere of an additional two-hour broadcast from 5 to 7 a.m.) and the weekend editions of its 10 p.m. newscast—retitled WFXR News First at 10—to one hour. Subsequently, in November, the station debuted a half-hour local sports highlight program on Friday nights following the 10 p.m. newscast.

The formation of the news department and concurrent move to the Valleypointe facility resulted in the hiring of 33 news and production employees to WFXR's staff, in addition to the Nexstar employees that had already been contributing to the station's newscasts (including 10 p.m. co-anchor Becky Freemal and morning anchor Tara Wheeler).

== Technical information ==
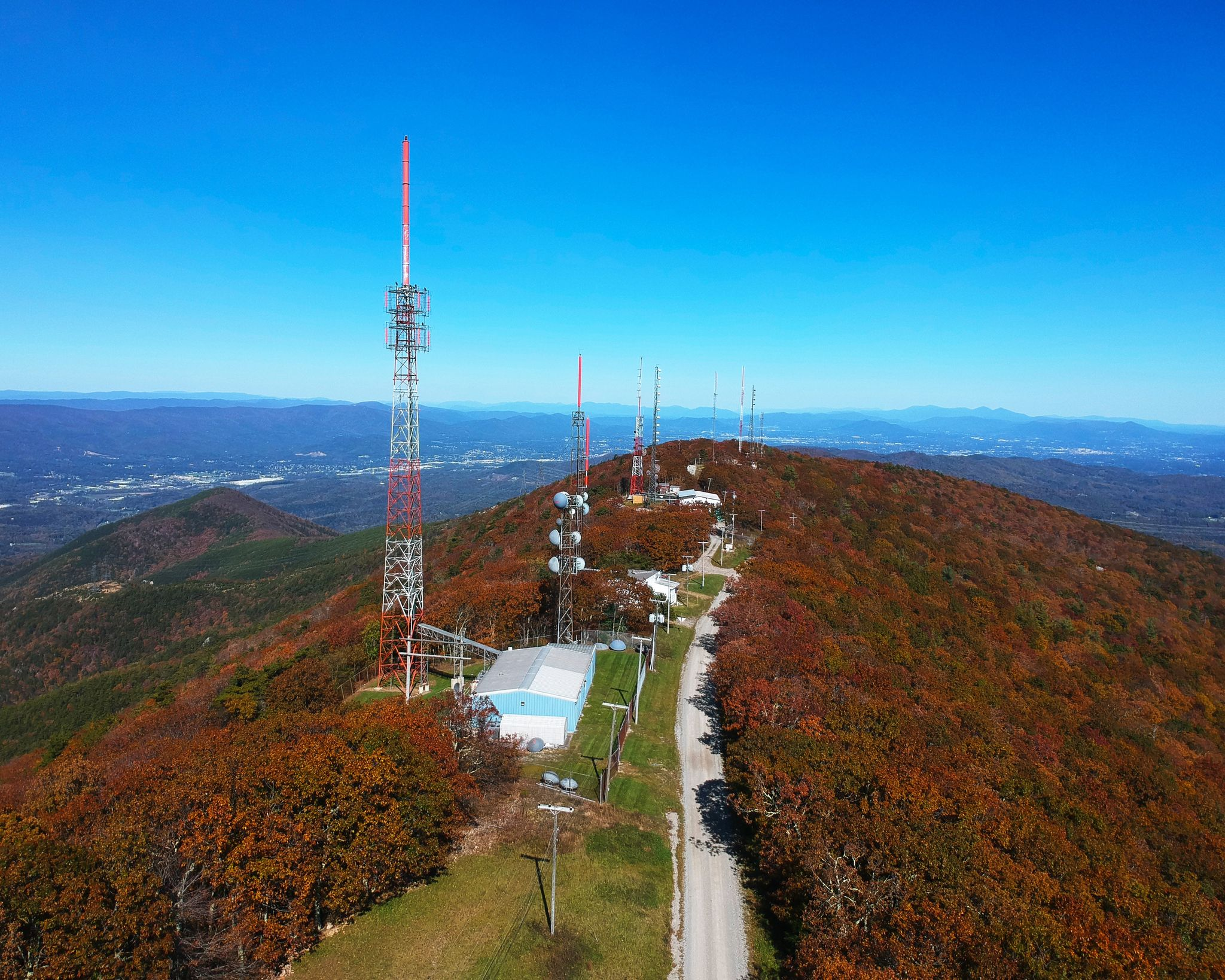
WFXR is broadcast from Poor Mountain.

=== Subchannels ===
WFXR and WWCW broadcast two shared channels (Fox on 27.1 and 21.2 and The CW on 27.2 and 21.1) and two unique diginets each.

Subchannels of WFXR
Subchannel	Res.	Short name	Programming
27.1	720p	WFXR-HD	Fox
27.2	720p	WWCW-HD	The CW (WWCW)
27.3	480i	Bounce	Bounce TV
27.4	480i	ANT TV	Antenna TV

Simulcast of subchannels of another station

=== Analog-to-digital conversion ===
WFXR ended regular programming on its analog signal, over UHF channel 27, on June 12, 2009, the official date on which full-power television stations in the United States transitioned from analog to digital broadcasts under federal mandate. The station's digital signal remained on its pre-transition UHF channel 17, using virtual channel 27.
