= WVBE =

WVBE may refer to:

- WVBE-FM, a radio station (100.1 FM) licensed to serve Lynchburg, Virginia, United States
- WPLY, a radio station (610 AM) licensed to serve Roanoke, Virginia, that held the call sign WVBE from 2002 to 2016
