= WPLY (disambiguation) =

WPLY may refer to:

- WPLY, a radio station (1390 AM) licensed to serve Lynchburg, Virginia, United States
- WPLY (Roanoke, Virginia), a radio station (610 AM) licensed to serve Roanoke, Virginia, United States, which held the call sign WPLY from 2016 to 2025
- WPLY (Mount Pocono, Pennsylvania), a defunct radio station (960 AM) formerly licensed to serve Mount Pocono, Pennsylvania, United States
- WFYX, a radio station (96.3 FM) licensed to Walpole, New Hampshire, United States, which held the call sign WPLY-FM from 2005 to 2008
- WRNB, a radio station (100.3 FM) licensed to serve Media, Pennsylvania, which held the call sign WPLY from 1993 to 2005
- WGXI, a radio station (1420 AM) licensed to serve Plymouth, Wisconsin, United States, which held the call sign WPLY until 1991
