= Poor Mountain =

Mountain in Virginia, United States

- Poor Mountain from across Poages Valley in Roanoke, Virginia.

Highest point
- Elevation: 3,928 ft (1,197 m)
- Prominence: 1,448 ft (441 m)
- Coordinates: 37°10′46″N 80°09′46″W

Geography
- Location: Montgomery / Roanoke counties, Virginia, U.S.
- Parent range: Appalachian Mountains, Blue Ridge Mountains
- Topo map: USGS Elliston

Climbing
- Easiest route: Road

Poor Mountain is a ridge of high peaks located in Roanoke County, Virginia and Montgomery County, Virginia. At 3,928 feet, Poor Mountain is the tallest mountain in the immediate area.

Poor Mountain has the largest known population, by far, of piratebush (Buckleya distichophylla), a plant which draws nutrients from the roots of Eastern Hemlock trees. Piratebush is found only in limited numbers at a few other locations in Virginia, North Carolina, and Tennessee. The Poor Mountain Natural Area Preserve has been established to protect this population.

Twelve O'clock Knob is located adjacent to Poor Mountain in Roanoke County directly south of Salem, Virginia. The north slope of the ridgeline formed by Poor Mountain and Twelve O'clock Knob marks the southwestern boundary of the Roanoke Valley. Fort Lewis Mountain is located directly across the valley from Poor Mountain.

== Communications hub ==
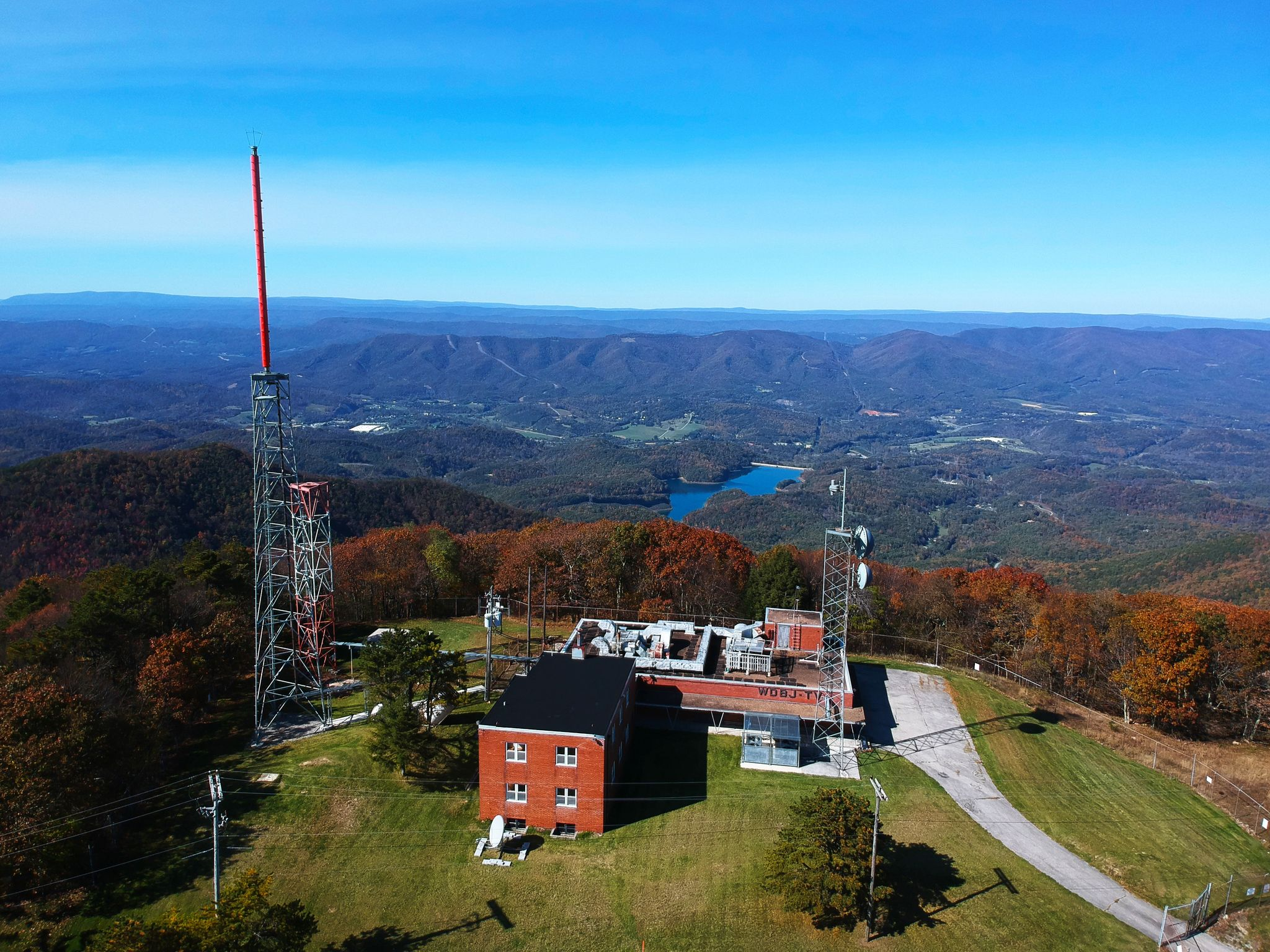
The WDBJ Transmitter site is the largest on Poor Mountain

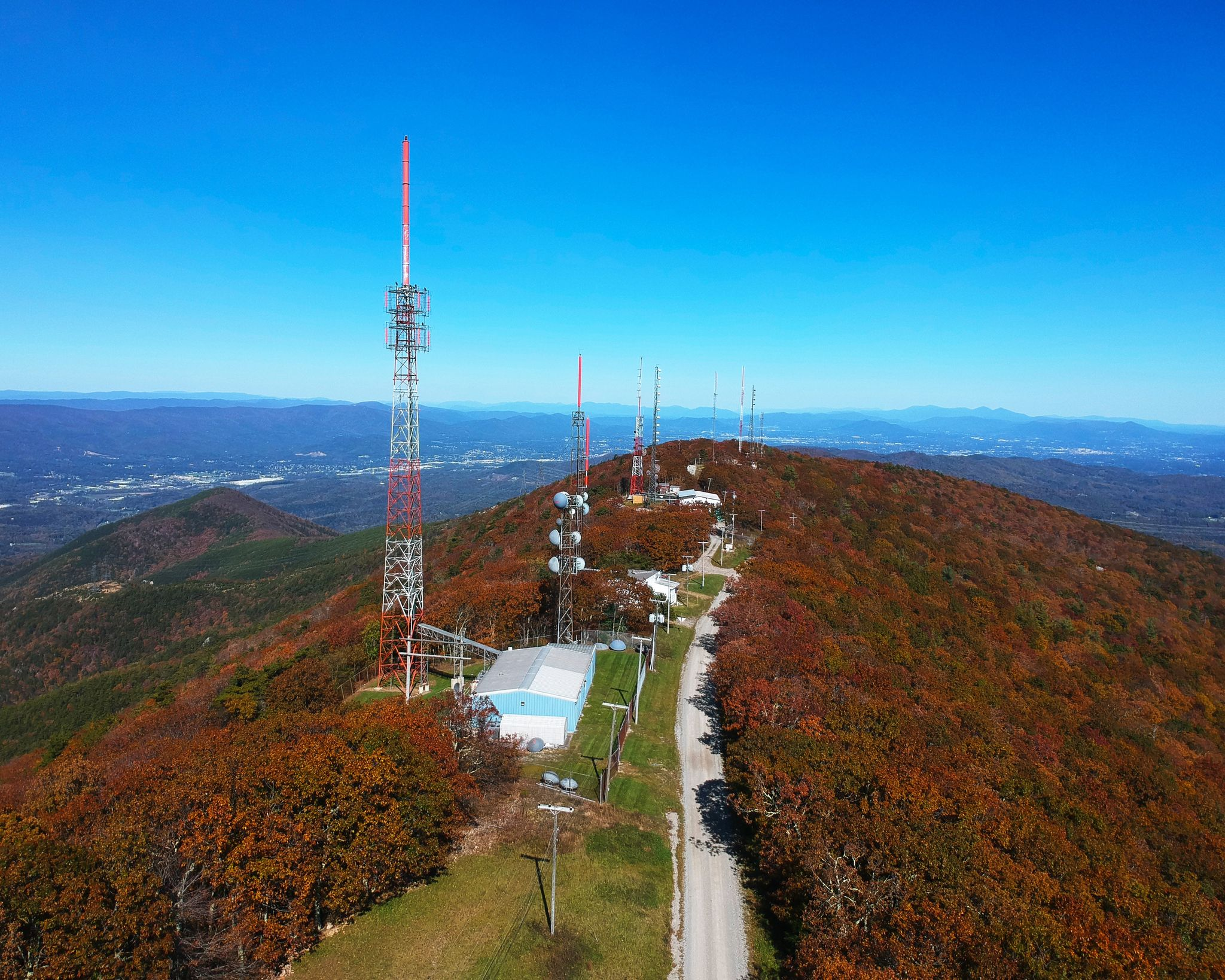
Looking East on the antenna farm on Poor Mountain

Poor Mountain is the location of several broadcasting antennas for radio and television stations in the Roanoke, Virginia-Lynchburg, Virginia Designated Market Area (DMA). On the apex of the mountain in what's referred to as an "antenna farm" are the broadcasting antennas on towers for radio stations WVTF(FM) 89.1, licensed to the Virginia Tech Foundation, Inc.; WXL60 (VHF-FM) 162.475 MHz (NOAA Weather Radio), licensed to NOAA, National Weather Service; W220BD 91.9, licensed to Family Radio; and three radio stations licensed to Mel Wheeler, Incorporated, WXLK(FM) 92.3; WSLC-FM 94.9; and WSLQ(FM) 99.1. Digital television stations located in the antenna farm are WBRA-TV 3 (PSIP Channel 15), WDBJ 18 (PSIP Channel 7), WSLS-TV 30 (PSIP Channel 10), WFXR 17 (PSIP Channel 27), WPXR-TV 36 (PSIP Channel 38), and WEDD-LD 26. All of these stations are licensed to Roanoke. Other telecommunication antennas and towers for local, county, state and national public service, are also located on Poor Mountain, and their flashing Federal Aviation Administration tower lights can be seen from dozens of miles away, especially at night.

The antennas for the other primary digital TV stations in the Roanoke DMA, WSET-TV 13 (PSIP Channel 13) and WWCW 20 (PSIP Channel 21) are located on towers on Thaxton Mountain, halfway between Lynchburg and Roanoke. Prior to the 2009 digital TV transition, WSET could not locate on Poor Mountain because of an inability to provide analog "city-grade" coverage of Lynchburg from that site, in addition to short-spacing concerns with WOWK-TV in Huntington, West Virginia.

The Poor Mountain broadcast antenna farm is a good example of radio and TV stations, co-locating their broadcast towers near each other on the highest point near their Federal Communications Commission (FCC) city of license.

== Wind farm bid ==
The mountain is under consideration for the placement of a wind farm. Reportedly, Invenergy Wind LLC dropped the idea of putting wind turbines on Poor Mountain and neighboring Bent Mountain, as a study concluded that the potential energy would overload the existing electricity transmission lines found in the immediate area, however they have not and are still trying to pass the project through state and local government venues. They already have the land leased for up to 54 of the 443-foot tall wind turbines.
