= WROV-TV =

Television station in Roanoke, Virginia (1953)

- Roanoke, Virginia; United States
- Channels: Analog: 27 (UHF)

Programming
- Affiliations: ABC

Ownership
- Owner: Radio Roanoke
- Sister stations: WROV; WROV-FM

History
- First air date: March 2, 1953
- Last air date: July 18, 1953
- Call sign meaning: "Roanoke, Virginia", from the co-owned radio stations

WROV-TV (channel 27) was a television station in Roanoke, Virginia, United States. It broadcast from March 2 to July 18, 1953, becoming the first ultra high frequency (UHF) station in the United States to cease broadcasting. Its failure was the first of many in the early days of UHF television, which was hindered by signal issues in mountainous areas and the lack of UHF tuning on all television sets—a problem not resolved until the All-Channel Receiver Act took effect in 1964.

== History ==
When the Federal Communications Commission (FCC) lifted its four-year freeze on television channel allocations in 1952, it added the UHF band to television assignments, including channel 27 to Roanoke, which already had two very high frequency (VHF) station assignments: channels 7 and 10. The unfreezing allowed the commission to consider amended versions of pre-existing applications from all three Roanoke radio stations: WDBJ and WROV had applied for channel 7 and WSLS for channel 10, with the new channel 27 initially finding no interested parties. This changed quickly in late July, when Rollins Broadcasting applied for channel 27; days later, WROV amended its own application to change from channel 7 to channel 27. Radio Roanoke, the parent of WROV radio, sought to make the move so as to leave WDBJ uncontested for channel 7 and hasten the arrival of television to the city. This almost did not work, as Polan Industries of Huntington, West Virginia, which had filed for channel 10, then sought channel 7.

In September 1952, the FCC issued construction permits for the two uncontested channels. WSLS-TV received its permit on September 10; after Rollins withdrew its channel 27 proposal, Radio Roanoke was issued the construction permit for WROV-TV a week later. It announced it hoped to be on the air before the end of 1952 as well as details of its programming and facility plans: it would add television studios in the existing WROV radio facility in the Mountain Trust Building, broadcast from Mill Mountain, and would seek affiliation with ABC, matching the radio station. On November 1, station general manager Frank Koehler announced that WROV-TV would indeed be an ABC affiliate. The station did not begin in 1952, as key equipment including its transmitter, antenna, and transmission line had yet to arrive. The transmitter did not arrive in Roanoke until the end of January; it was the ninth UHF transmitter delivered by RCA. As a result, unlike WSLS-TV—on air December 11—WROV-TV missed the Christmas shopping season and a prime opportunity to promote sets that could receive it. WSLS-TV was a primary NBC affiliate with additional programs from CBS; however, CBS showed little interest in letting WROV-TV carry its remaining programming in the Roanoke area.

WROV-TV began broadcasting test patterns with little fanfare on February 16, 1953, as only television dealers had been advised that the station was on the air. The station announced it would not begin broadcasting programs until servicemen in the area had installed the necessary tuner strips and converters to allow the UHF station to be received on sets that could only tune the VHF band. The inaugural programs aired on the evening of March 2, which included a dedication featuring civic leaders and the film The Shanghai Gesture. The station only had one camera for local program production.

The station quickly accumulated financial losses totaling $11,475 in three months, which only increased with each month the station was on the air. In late June, Radio Roanoke asked the FCC for permission to move to channel 7, which was still in hearing between WDBJ and Polan. It cited primarily reception issues; its signal was at a severe advantage to WSLS-TV, which had gone on the air before WROV-TV in December 1952, and the firm noted that channel 10 was reaching four times as many households and thus attracting national advertising interest. Among local advertisers, a roster of 70 at launch had dwindled to 10 by June. The station had to pay the same amount as WSLS-TV for films despite having no network income and reaching far fewer homes. Its plight prompted J. Frank Beatty, an editor for Broadcasting-Telecasting magazine, to write a feature article, "What Happened In Roanoke?", analyzing the plight of channel 27. Beatty pointed out that while the Roanoke Valley was getting good pictures, they weren't reaching beyond mountains even 10 miles (16 km) from the transmitter; that households were hesitant to invest in UHF conversion when some network shows were already available on VHF stations.

WROV-TV announced on July 15 that it would close at the end of telecasting on Saturday, July 18, in hopes that going off the air would allow its proposal for channel 7 to be considered by the FCC. WSLS-TV then secured an affiliation with ABC to air its programs in Roanoke beginning the next day, July 19. WROV-TV became the first operating television station to permanently cease broadcasting and surrender its operating authority (in this case, a construction permit, as a broadcast license had not been given).

Radio Roanoke's bid to reestablish itself on VHF ultimately ended in January 1955 when Times-World Corporation, the owner of WDBJ and publisher of The Roanoke Times and The Roanoke World-News, reached an agreement to buy some of WROV-TV's studio equipment in exchange for Radio Roanoke withdrawing its channel 7 application, leaving WDBJ uncontested for the channel (as Polan had long since dropped out). The move brought to an end a process that had previously been frozen by the March 24, 1954, death of Junius P. Fishburn, president of the Times-World Corporation, while in Washington for the comparative hearing.

WROV's failure was the first in a series that brought into stark relief the economic troubles of UHF television against existing VHF stations. By the end of 1953, another UHF station—WBES-TV in Buffalo, New York—had ceased operating, and the DuMont Television Network had a high-profile failure in early 1954 when it shut down KCTY after attempting to operate it for just two months.

A second attempt at putting channel 27 on the air in Roanoke was made by WRFT-TV, later WRLU, which operated from 1966 to 1974 and then from 1974 to 1975, closing twice for financial reasons. The third and current channel 27 station in the city, WVFT (now WFXR), began broadcasting in 1986.
