= The Roanoke Times =

Newspaper in Roanoke, Virginia

- The July 27, 2005 front page of The Roanoke Times
- Type: Daily newspaper
- Format: Broadsheet
- Owner: Lee Enterprises
- Publisher: Samuel Worthington
- Founded: 1886
- Language: English
- Headquarters: 210 Church Ave SW Suite 100; Roanoke, Virginia 24011; United States
- Circulation: 8,041 Average print circulation 9,533 Digital Subscribers
- ISSN: 2163-4890
- OCLC number: 14157370
- Website: roanoke.com

The Roanoke Times is the primary newspaper in Southwestern Virginia and is based in Roanoke, Virginia, United States. It is published by Lee Enterprises. In addition to its headquarters in Roanoke, it maintains a bureau in Christiansburg, covering the eastern New River Valley and Virginia Tech.

== History ==
The Roanoke Daily Times began publication in 1886. The paper's original owner, M. H. Claytor, eventually added a companion evening newspaper, The Roanoke Evening News. In 1909, he sold the paper to a group headed by banker J. B. Fishburn. The Fishburn group bought the Roanoke Evening World in 1913, merging it with the Evening News and changing its name to the Roanoke World-News. At the same time, Times-World Corporation was formed as the owner of both papers.

By 1931, Times-World Corporation had expanded into broadcasting with the purchase of WDBJ (now WFIR), Roanoke's first radio station. It eventually spawned an FM station (now WSLC) and a television station (which still has the WDBJ calls). In 1969, Times-World merged with Landmark Communications, which sold off the broadcasting properties and kept the papers. In 1977, Landmark merged the two papers into a single all-day paper, The Roanoke Times & World-News. The World-News was dropped from the masthead in 1995.

Landmark started shopping its newspaper properties in 2008 and sold the Times to Berkshire Hathaway's BH Media Group in 2013. This made the Times a sister publication to the Richmond Times-Dispatch, as well as the News & Advance of Lynchburg, the other major paper serving the Roanoke/Lynchburg media market.

In November 2025, The Times moved to a six day printing schedule, eliminating its printed Monday edition.

== Notable stories ==
As the major daily newspaper for Roanoke and much of Southwest Virginia, The Roanoke Times has extensively covered news events from the area that have gained national media exposure. Some examples include:

- International Marketing & Engineering Inc., investigated by The Roanoke Times, 1979, subsequently featured by Harry Reasoner in a CBS 60 Minutes report on the company engaged in deceptive sales practices, whose officers were later sentenced to federal prison. The Roanoke Times was awarded the Virginia Press Association's W. S. Copeland Award for Journalistic Integrity and Community Service, its highest, for the investigation. The award was named after one of the prior owners of the Roanoke Times, Walter Scott Copeland, but was later retitled the "Virginia Press Association Award for Journalistic Integrity and Community Service" to distance itself from its namesake.
- The November 4, 1985, flood that caused extensive damage around Roanoke and left 10 people dead.
- The September 22, 2000, shooting at the Backstreet Cafe in downtown Roanoke motivated by the assailant's hatred of the establishment's gay and lesbian clientele.
- The April 16, 2007, shooting at Virginia Tech, which claimed 32 lives.
- The February, 2008 resignation of Roanoke City councilman Alfred Dowe. Dowe resigned after The Roanoke Times obtained documents showing that he billed taxpayers twice for some of the nearly $15,000 he spent in 2007 on meals and travel.
- The Aug. 26, 2015, on-air murders of WDBJ-TV journalists Alison Parker and Adam Ward.

== Notable writers, columnists and editors ==
- Bill Brill, writer and columnist 1956–1991, sports editor 1960–1991
- Beth Macy, reporter 1989–2014

== Popular features and columns ==
- Arts & Extras, arts and culture column by Mike Allen (2009–2021)
- Cut 'N' Scratch, music feature by Tad Dickens (2007-)
- McFarling Journal, sports column by Aaron McFarling (2004-)
- Paparazzi, event photo feature by various contributors
- Shoptimist, shopping feature by Rebecca Holland (2011–2014) Stephanie Ogilvie (2014–2016)
- Style Street, fashion feature by David Verde (2011–2014)
- Weather Journal, weather column by Kevin Myatt (2003-)

== Awards ==
- 2007 Missouri Lifestyle Journalism Award for General Excellence, Class III
