= WWOD (disambiguation) =

WWOD is a radio station (93.9 FM) licensed to serve Woodstock, Vermont, United States.

WWOD may also refer to:

- WJKS (FM), a radio station (104.3 FM) licensed to serve Hartford, Vermont, United States which held the WWOD call sign from 2000 to 2012
- WVBE-FM, which had the WWOD call sign
- Wonderful World of Disney, an anthology TV series
