= WPVR =

WPVR may refer to:

- WPVR-LP, a low-power radio station (101.3 FM) licensed to serve Mt. Airy, North Carolina, United States
- WSLC-FM, a radio station (94.9 FM) licensed to serve Roanoke, Virginia, United States, which held the call sign WPVR until 2000
