= Fox 21 =

Fox 21 may refer to:

Television stations in the United States:

- WHNS in Greenville, South Carolina
- WFXR in Roanoke, Virginia (as "Fox 21/27")
- KXRM-TV in Colorado Springs, Colorado
- KQDS-TV in Duluth, Minnesota
- WBOC-DT2 in Salisbury, Maryland

Other uses:

- Fox 21 Television Studios, a unit of 20th Television
