= WSLC-FM =

- Roanoke, Virginia; United States
- Broadcast area: Roanoke, Virginia; Lynchburg, Virginia; New River Valley
- Frequency: 94.9 MHz
- Branding: 94.9 Star Country

Programming
- Format: Country

Ownership
- Owner: Mel Wheeler, Inc.
- Sister stations: WFIR; WSLQ; WPLY; WVBB; WVBE-FM; WXLK; WZZU

History
- First air date: July 11, 1948
- Former call signs: WDBJ-FM (1948–1969); WPVR (1969–2000)
- Call sign meaning: Shenandoah Life Country or Super Lovin Country

Technical information
- Licensing authority: FCC
- Facility ID: 30156
- Class: C
- ERP: 100,000 watts (with beam tilt)
- HAAT: 598 meters (1,962 ft)
- Transmitter coordinates: 37°11′50″N 80°9′11″W

Links
- Public license information: Public file; LMS
- Webcast: Listen live
- Website: www.949starcountry.com

WSLC-FM (94.9 MHz) is a commercial radio station licensed to Roanoke, Virginia, and serving the Roanoke Valley and New River Valley. WSLC-FM is owned and operated by Mel Wheeler, Inc. It airs a country music radio format, using the moniker "94.9 Star Country". WSLC-FM's studios and offices are on Electric Road in Roanoke. The transmitter is off Honeysuckle Road in Bent Mountain.

The station is powered at 100,000 watts effective radiated power (ERP) on a tower 1962 feet in height above average terrain (HAAT). The Class C signal can be heard over much of Southwest Virginia and into North Carolina and West Virginia. On occasion, WSLC-FM can be picked up more than 200 miles away.

== History ==
=== WDBJ-FM ===
On July 11, 1948, the station signed on as WDBJ-FM. It was owned by the Times World Corporation, publisher of The Roanoke Times-World, which in 1955 started WDBJ-TV (channel 7). At first, WDBJ-FM simulcast its AM counterpart, WDBJ (960 AM).

In the early 1960s, WDBJ-FM was separately programmed with an automated beautiful music format, which lasted till the mid-1990s. The station concentrated on instrumental versions of popular songs, as well as Broadway and Hollywood showtunes.

=== WPVR ===
In 1969, Jim Gibbons Radio, Inc. bought the station. While the format remained beautiful music, on November 1, the call sign was changed to WPVR. In the 1980s, the station began playing several vocal songs each hour, moving to an easy listening sound.

In the 1990s, many easy listening stations began decreasing the orchestrated instrumentals, and by 1992, WPVR had evolved into soft adult contemporary, branded as "Lite 95". In 1995, WPVR became "Arrow 94.9" with a classic rock format.

=== 94.9 Star Country WSLC-FM ===
In 2000, Mel Wheeler, Inc. bought the station, along with WSLQ and WFIR (the former WDBJ AM). At noon on May 25, the call sign was switched to WSLC-FM. The format flipped to country music, branded as "The New 94.9 Star Country". The sister station of WSLC-FM, WSLC (610 AM), had played country music for over 50 years, so both the AM and FM carried the same call letters and country music imaging for two years. On March 13, 2002, AM 610 ended its run as a country station, becoming urban adult contemporary WVBE, "The Vibe." In 2016 it flipped to sports radio as WPLY.

After April 1, 2004, WSLC-FM stopped calling itself "The New 94.9 Star Country", and began using the branding "94.9 Star Country; Your Big Giveaway Station".
