= WWCW =

Television station in Lynchburg, Virginia

- Lynchburg–Roanoke, Virginia; United States
- City: Lynchburg, Virginia
- Channels: Digital: 21 (UHF); Virtual: 21
- Branding: The CW Virginia

Programming
- Affiliations: 21.1: The CW; 21.2: Fox; for others, see § Subchannels

Ownership
- Owner: Nexstar Media Group; (Nexstar Media Inc.)
- Sister stations: WFXR

History
- First air date: March 23, 1986
- Former call signs: WJPR (1986–2006)
- Former channel numbers: Analog: 21 (UHF, 1986–2009); Digital: 20 (UHF, 2002–2019)
- Former affiliations: Independent (March–October 1986); Fox (1986–2009); The WB (secondary, 1999–2001 and 2002–2006) (Note: The WB was aired on the main channel from 1999 to 2001, when local cable channel "WBVA" was launched. This was then added as a subchannel to both stations beginning in 2002.)
- Call sign meaning: Went with brand of CW cable channel as "WCW5"

Technical information
- Licensing authority: FCC
- Facility ID: 24812
- ERP: 938 kW
- HAAT: 503.1 m (1,651 ft)
- Transmitter coordinates: 37°19′15″N 79°37′57″W
- Repeater: WFXR 27.2 Roanoke

Links
- Public license information: Public file; LMS

WWCW (channel 21) is a television station licensed to Lynchburg, Virginia, United States, serving as the CW outlet for the Roanoke–Lynchburg market. It is owned by Nexstar Media Group alongside Roanoke-licensed Fox affiliate WFXR (channel 27). The two stations share studios at the Valleypointe office park on Valleypointe Parkway in northeastern Roanoke County; WWCW operates an advertising sales office on Airport Road, along Lynchburg's southwestern border with Campbell County. The station's transmitter is located on Thaxton Mountain in central Bedford County. WFXR broadcasts WWCW's CW programming from its transmitter on Poor Mountain in Roanoke County as one of its subchannels and vice versa.

The construction permit for channel 21 in Lynchburg was awarded to communications consultant James E. Price in 1982, but Price sold the station to several different investor groups before Lynchburg–Roanoke Television Partners, led by Thomas F. Carney, built the station. WJPR began broadcasting on March 23, 1986, as an independent station, adding affiliation with Fox in October 1986. The market proved unable to bear both WJPR and Roanoke's WVFT (channel 27), which had gone on the air later that year, due to insufficient advertising revenue and signal issues; in November 1988, WJPR filed for bankruptcy protection. In 1990, Henry A. Ash of Tampa, Florida, acquired both stations out of bankruptcy, receiving a federal waiver to own the combination. On August 20, 1990, they began simulcasting as "Fox 21/27", the Fox affiliate for the market; WJPR had been airing Fox programming since October 1986.

WVFT and WJPR were acquired in 1993 by Grant Communications, and WVFT changed its call sign to WFXR-TV. Under Grant, the stations began airing a local newscast produced by WSLS-TV and also acquired The WB and later The CW affiliation in the market, which was initially aired in overnight hours and then on a local cable channel. With the conversion to digital broadcasting, the Fox and CW services were broadcast as subchannels in both Roanoke and Lynchburg, with channel 21 recognized as the originating station for The CW. Nexstar acquired WFXR and WWCW in 2013 and moved them into new, larger studios two years later, allowing them to begin producing their own news programming.

== History ==
=== Early years ===
Channel 21 at Lynchburg picked up no interest until communications consultant James E. Price of Chattanooga, Tennessee, applied for the channel in 1982 under the name Lynchburg Television Associates. The construction permit was awarded in November 1982, took the call sign WJPR, and then was sold to a new investor group led by Price. The permit changed hands two more times before the station was launched, first to Carney Communications of Virginia—owned by Thomas F. Carney of Bal Harbour, Florida—and then to a partnership led by Carney known as Lynchburg–Roanoke Television Partners. One of the partners in the firm was Ralph Renick, a longtime television news anchor in Miami.

Construction began in October 1985 at the Thaxton Mountain tower after approval came from Bedford County officials, and the station announced its existence as the first independent in the market. It stated it would launch by the end of 1985, but that date was missed. So too was a target date of February 10, with winter weather being the culprit.

WJPR debuted on March 23, 1986, giving the market a general-entertainment independent station and being the second of three new station launches that year in western Virginia (the others being Christian station WEFC on channel 38, which started January 3, and Family Group Broadcasting-owned independent WVFT on channel 27 in November 1986). Programming was a typical mix of sitcoms, children's shows, and sports, including Baltimore Orioles baseball. It broadcast from studios and offices in a converted Kroger grocery store in Lynchburg's Forest Hills Shopping Center. The Fox network was added to the station's lineup when it launched that October, as well as local high school football telecasts.

WJPR and WVFT gave the Roanoke–Lynchburg market two independent stations in a short amount of time. Channel 21 had a slow start; some cable systems, notably in Lynchburg itself, balked at carrying the new station, and there were few immediate local advertisers. Neither station was able to find sufficient advertising revenue, and it became clear that the Roanoke-Lynchburg market was not large enough to sustain what were essentially two independent stations. Like most early Fox affiliates, WJPR was still programmed largely as an independent. In November 1988, three months after Paramount Pictures sued the station for a debt of $950,000, Lynchburg–Roanoke Television Partners filed for Chapter 11 bankruptcy reorganization. It was joined in Chapter 11 status by WVFT in April 1989.

=== Merger with WVFT ===
On September 13 and 15, 1989, bankruptcy courts in Lynchburg and Tampa, Florida, gave NewSouth Broadcasting, a company owned by Timothy Brumlik of Altamonte Springs, Florida, permission to purchase WJPR and WVFT with the intention of consolidating their programming. The deal began to fall apart on the 15th, however, when Brumlik was arrested on charges of laundering up to $12 million in Colombian drug money. Officials alleged that Brumlik's ownership of TeleOnce in Puerto Rico was a front for two important Latin American media men: Remigio Ángel González, reported to be a business partner with Manuel Noriega in a Panamanian television station, and Julio Vera Gutiérrez, a Peruvian citizen.

The indictment scrambled the picture for the stations Brumlik sought to buy. At the time of his arrest, he had been approved by bankruptcy courts or the FCC to buy WJPR and WVFT; WKCH-TV in Knoxville, Tennessee; and the then-unbuilt WGNM in Macon, Georgia. With regard to WJPR and WVFT, his arrest and indictment caused him to be unable to fulfill commitments required by the bankruptcy courts. Instead, Henry A. Ash, a Tampa life insurance broker, bid on both stations with the same goal: to combine them. Ash's Roanoke–Lynchburg TV Acquisition Corporation—with WJPR majority owner Thomas Carney as a stockholder—received court approval to buy both stations, paying $2.95 million for WJPR and $1.25 million for WVFT, in February 1990. It then filed with the FCC for a waiver of its rule that prohibited ownership of stations with overlapping signal coverage areas, believing that the market could bear one independent station but not two.

On August 20, 1990, with the purchases pending at the FCC, WVFT began simulcasting WJPR, expanding Fox network coverage to the market's western portions for the first time. FCC approval followed the next month. Key in winning approval was that adding channel 27 to channel 21 provided Fox service to an additional 213,000 people; the commission found it unlikely that the stations could exist separately given their financial problems and local terrain.

=== Grant ownership ===
On September 15, 1993, WVFT and WJPR were purchased by Grant Communications, owned by Milton Grant. The sale to Grant came after Carney and Ash opted to split their interests in Roanoke–Lynchburg TV Acquisition Corporation. In October 1993, WVFT had its call letters changed to WFXR-TV. Grant also upgraded the station's equipment, and the Fox network itself matured during the first years of Grant ownership.

WJPR–WFXR became a secondary affiliate of The WB in 1999, when the network ceased airing its programming on Superstation WGN nationally. Programs aired in overnight hours until February 1, 2001, when WJPR/WFXR launched a cable-only WB affiliate known as "WBVA-TV" and seen on Cox Communications channel 5. It was also announced at that time that "WBVA" would become a full-power service on channel 21 in May 2001, though instead it was broadcast as a subchannel from the WJPR transmitter beginning in April 2002. In 2006, when The WB and UPN merged into The CW, channels 21 and 27 obtained the rights to the affiliation in the market, with the cable channel going by "WCW5-TV" and the call letters on channel 21 changing to WWCW. As early as 2007, The CW was airing in high definition from the WWCW transmitter and in standard definition from the WFXR transmitter (and vice versa for Fox), ensuring coverage of both services in the Roanoke and Lynchburg areas.

=== Nexstar ownership ===
On November 6, 2013, the Irving, Texas–based Nexstar Broadcasting Group announced that it would purchase the Grant stations, including WFXR and WWCW, for $87.5 million. The sale was approved by the FCC on November 3, 2014, and was finalized one month later on December 1.

In March 2015, Joseph McNamara—who was appointed as vice president for the stations three months earlier in December 2014—announced that Nexstar planned to move WFXR/WWCW's operations and staff into a new, larger 14,830-square-foot (1,000 m^{2}) studio facility at the Valleypointe office park in northeastern Roanoke County, near Roanoke–Blacksburg Regional Airport. WFXR and WWCW migrated their operations into the new facility—which cost $3 million to build—during the week of September 14, 2015.

On January 27, 2016, Nexstar announced it would acquire Media General for $4.6 billion. Nexstar opted to retain WFXR and WWCW over Media General-owned WSLS-TV, which was divested to Graham Media Group.

== Newscasts ==
WJPR and WFXR began airing a local newscast produced by produced by WSLS-TV in 1996. The newscast continued on the Fox subchannel until October 1, 2015, when news production was taken in-house with the move to the Valleypointe studios.

== Technical information ==
=== Subchannels ===
WWCW broadcasts from a transmitter on Thaxton Mountain in central Bedford County. WWCW and WFXR broadcast two shared channels (The CW on 21.1 and 27.2 and Fox on 21.2 and 27.1) and two unique diginets each. Also broadcast on the WWCW multiplex are two subchannels of WZBJ-CD as part of the market's ATSC 3.0 (NextGen TV) hosting arrangement.

Subchannels of WWCW
| Subchannel | Res. | Short name | Programming |
|---|---|---|---|
| 21.1 | 720p | WWCW-HD | The CW |
| 21.2 | 720p | WFXR-HD | Fox (WFXR) |
| 21.3 | 480i | Rewind | MovieSphere Gold |
| 21.4 | 480i | Grit | Grit |
| 24.2 | 480i | Cozi | Cozi TV (WZBJ-CD) |
| 24.3 | 480i | Decades | Catchy Comedy (WZBJ-CD) |

Simulcast of subchannels of another station
Broadcast on behalf of another station

=== Analog-to-digital conversion ===
WWCW ended regular programming on its analog signal, over UHF channel 21, on June 12, 2009, the official date on which full-power television stations in the United States transitioned from analog to digital broadcasts under federal mandate. The station's digital signal remained on its pre-transition UHF channel 20, using virtual channel 21.
