= WVBB (disambiguation) =

WVBB may refer to:

- WVBB, a radio station (97.7 FM) licensed to Elliston-Lafayette, Virginia
- WBTK, a radio station (1380 AM) licensed to Richmond, Virginia, which held the call sign WVBB from 2000 to 2001
- WRDF, a radio station (106.3 FM) licensed to Columbia City, Indiana, which held the call sign WVBB from 2007 to 2009
