= WEFC =

WEFC may refer to:

- WEFC-LP, a low-power radio station (92.7 FM) licensed to serve Galloway, Ohio, United States
- WZBJ, a television station (channel 24) licensed to serve Danville, Virginia, United States, which held the call sign WEFC-TV from 2011 to 2014
- WPXR-TV, a television station (channel 36, virtual 38) licensed to serve Roanoke, Virginia, which held the call sign WEFC from 1983 to 1998
- Whitehead Eagles F.C., Northern Irish football club
