= WROV =

WROV could refer to:

- WROV-FM, a radio station (96.3 FM), licensed to Martinsville, Virginia, United States
- WGMN, a radio station (1240 AM), licensed to Roanoke, Virginia, United States, which used the WROV call sign from 1946 to 1998
- WROV-TV, a defunct UHF television station previously located in Roanoke, Virginia, United States
