= WRFT-TV =

Television station in Roanoke, Virginia (1966–1975)

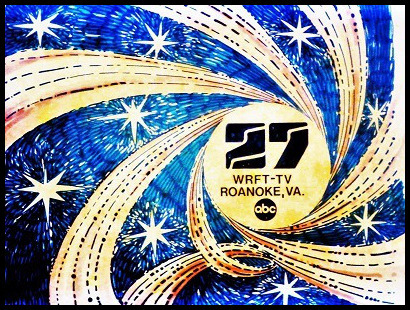
- Roanoke, Virginia; United States
- Channels: Analog: 27 (UHF)

Programming
- Affiliations: ABC

Ownership
- Owner: Roanoke Telecasting Corporation

History
- First air date: March 4, 1966
- Last air date: February 11, 1975
- Former call signs: WRLU (1974–1975)

Technical information
- ERP: 702 kW
- HAAT: 622 m (2,040 ft)
- Transmitter coordinates: 37°11′55.5″N 80°09′02.5″W

WRFT-TV (channel 27), known as WRLU from 1974 to 1975, was a television station in Roanoke, Virginia, United States. Affiliated with ABC through its existence, the station telecast from 1966 to 1975, with a short break in 1974. WRFT-TV operated from studios on Little Brushy Mountain in Salem and, in later years, a transmitter on Poor Mountain.

Channel 27 signed on after numerous failed attempts by ABC's primary affiliate in the market, Lynchburg's WLVA-TV, to improve its coverage in the market's more mountainous western portion. The station was plagued by financial problems for most of its existence, even after moving its transmitter to Poor Mountain alongside the other Roanoke-licensed stations in 1971. A mass staff walkout knocked the station off the air for much of the spring and summer of 1974. It returned that fall under new call letters, WRLU, but saw no change in its fortunes and was forced off the air for good in 1975 due to an unpaid power bill. The station was more than $1 million in debt when it closed.

== History ==
Roanoke had an ignominious history of UHF television prior to WRFT-TV. WROV-TV, also operating on the third of Roanoke's three commercial station allocations, had broadcast for less than five months in 1953 before becoming the first-ever television station to permanently shut down in the United States. Although Roanoke and Lynchburg had been treated as a single market since the 1950s, the market had not been fully realized. On paper, the market was served by three full network affiliates—Roanoke-based CBS affiliate WDBJ-TV, Roanoke-based NBC affiliate WSLS-TV, and Lynchburg-based ABC affiliate WLVA-TV. However, while the two Roanoke-based stations covered this vast and mountainous market very well, WLVA-TV could not be seen at all in much of the market's more rugged western portion, including parts of Roanoke. WLVA-TV had to build a translator in Roanoke (W05AA on channel 5) in 1963 to alleviate its shortfalls in the western portion of the market. This, along with the passage of the All-Channel Receiver Act, prompted another group, Roanoke Telecasting Corporation—headed by Frank Tirico—to apply for a construction permit to build a new station on channel 27, which was granted on July 2, 1965. Tirico had recently left Bahakel Enterprises, a company that had put several southern UHF stations on the air in the preceding years. The station took the call letters WRFT-TV and picked up an ABC affiliation.

WRFT-TV began broadcasting March 4, 1966, initially with a low 21,400 watts from a transmitter on Little Brushy Mountain overlooking Salem—also far lower than the Roanoke antenna farm on Poor Mountain. The antenna was 110 feet (34 m) above ground and 404 feet (123 m) above average terrain. Channel 27's affiliation agreement called for it to receive $75 an hour in compensation from ABC contingent on delivering 10,000 to 18,000 homes in prime time. However, the station never thrived; not even delivering 1,000 homes at peak hours, ABC lost patience and stopped compensation altogether in November 1967. Its financial picture was "dismal"; the station lost increasing amounts of money in its first three years.

In 1968, Roanoke attorney Alexander Apostolou bought controlling interest in Roanoke Telecasting when he purchased an additional 12.5 percent stake in the firm from Malcolm and Morton Rosenberg. One of its employees in the late 1960s was Adrian Cronauer, the radio disc jockey who inspired the 1987 film Good Morning, Vietnam. The station was, however, successful in obtaining an FCC ruling that prevented WLVA-TV's Roanoke translator from airing any ABC programs the same day they aired on WRFT-TV.

In June 1969, Roanoke Telecasting filed to move the transmitter to Poor Mountain and increase its effective radiated power to 250,000 watts. These proposed changes would increase the station's coverage area and signal strength, though it still would operate at fairly modest power for a network affiliate on the UHF band. However, they also would have pitted southwest Virginia's two ABC affiliates against one another, as channel 27's footprint would have a roughly 25 percent overlap with that of WLVA-TV's main transmitter. WLVA-TV was unsuccessful in its bid to stop this application, with a final decision in January 1972 finding in favor of channel 27. However, by this point in time, channel 27 was more than $450,000 in debt. Further exacerbating matters, ABC informed the station in 1970 that it would no longer pay the $3,600 monthly bill to directly connect WRFT-TV to the network. WRFT-TV sought permission from WLVA-TV to rebroadcast ABC network programs off-air, but was denied in the context of the rivalry between the two stations. The network called its decision not a reversal but rather a clarification of a misunderstanding, as it had believed that its contract with WRFT-TV required it to pay the cost. The move to Poor Mountain took place in 1971; citing the designation of the site as an antenna farm, WRFT-TV sought and obtained an injunction against WSLS-TV after lease negotiations broke down.

While WRFT-TV won the fight for equal technical footing with the other stations on the western side of the market, it still had the problem of increasingly desperate financial straits. The station's financial troubles came to a head in late April 1974, when Apostolou fired general manager Andy Peterson in a dispute over pay and new equipment. On April 30, in solidarity with Peterson, all of WRFT-TV's employees walked out; the station was able to broadcast for the rest of the day, but it failed to sign on the next day. Peterson argued that the station was being run in a poor manner, and the staff agreed. One of its production directors claimed the station was being "held together by chewing gum and rubber bands"; its chief engineer said it was still on the air "with the aid of a 15-watt Christmas bulb and baling wire". The station was spotted on May 28 intermittently rebroadcasting WRAL-TV, the then-ABC affiliate in Raleigh, North Carolina.

Apostolou announced that channel 27 would remain off the air until a new staff was hired. It finally returned on September 7 under a new set of call letters, WRLU. However, channel 27's turbulent ride would not last much longer. By February 1975, the station was reported to be $1.1 to $1.4 million in debt—which was impairing sale negotiations with several groups. It also owed $8,000 in unpaid bills to the Appalachian Power Company (Apco). Staffers had been working on a volunteer basis for at least five days. When Roanoke Telecasting missed a deadline to pay the electric bill, Apco shut off power to the station at 8:53 a.m. on the morning of February 11, 1975, right before the end of AM America. The station's equipment was foreclosed upon by the Mountain Trust Bank and sold in November to WOWL-TV of Florence, Alabama. On December 16, FCC lawyers gave Apostolou an ultimatum: unless channel 27 could find a new source of financing by the Christmas holidays, they would recommend that the commission revoke the license. On October 5, 1976, the FCC canceled the channel 27 license, finding that Roanoke Telecasting had "effectively abandoned" the frequency.

For the next five years, parts of Roanoke and the surrounding area were without a viewable ABC signal, with the rest dependent on the WLVA-TV translator. In 1980, channel 13, renamed WSET-TV, finally succeeded in winning approval for a new tower near Bedford on Thaxton Mountain, halfway between Roanoke and Lynchburg, allowing most of Roanoke to get a viewable signal from ABC for the first time.
