= Shenandoah Life Insurance Company =

- Type: Subsidiary
- Industry: Insurance
- Founded: 1916; 110 years ago
- Headquarters: Roanoke, Virginia
- Owner: Prosperity Life Insurance Group, LLC

The Shenandoah Life Insurance Company is an insurance company based in Roanoke, Virginia, United States. Founded in 1916, the company operated until 2012 as a policyholder-owned mutual insurance company when it was sold to United Prosperity Life. In 2012, the company was demutualized into a subsidiary of Prosperity Life Insurance Group, LLC.

== Media properties ==
Shenandoah Life entered radio in 1940, when it signed on WSLS radio; the call letters stand for "Shenandoah Life Station". An FM station followed in 1947.

The company launched Roanoke's first television station, WSLS-TV on Dec. 11, 1952. Shenandoah sold the station to Park Communications in 1959. Park sold off the radio stations, with the AM side becoming WSLC (now WPLY after several format changes) and the FM side becoming WSLQ.
