= WSLQ =

- Roanoke, Virginia; United States
- Broadcast area: New River Valley; Southwest Virginia
- Frequency: 99.1 MHz
- Branding: Q99

Programming
- Format: Adult contemporary
- Affiliations: Compass Media Networks; Premiere Networks

Ownership
- Owner: Mel Wheeler, Inc.
- Sister stations: WFIR; WSLC-FM; WVBB; WPLY; WVBE-FM; WXLK

History
- First air date: November 1, 1947
- Former call signs: WSLS-FM (1947–1972); WSLC-FM (1972–1973)
- Call sign meaning: Shenandoah Life Q

Technical information
- Licensing authority: FCC
- Facility ID: 41112
- Class: C
- ERP: 200,000 watts (with beam tilt)
- HAAT: 598 meters (1,962 ft)
- Transmitter coordinates: 37°11′50.4″N 80°9′10.1″W

Links
- Public license information: Public file; LMS
- Webcast: Listen live
- Website: www.q99fm.com

WSLQ (99.1 FM "Q99") is a commercial radio station licensed to Roanoke, Virginia, serving the New River Valley and Southwest Virginia. The station airs an adult contemporary radio format, switching to Christmas music for much of November and December. It is owned and operated by Mel Wheeler, Inc., with studios and offices on Electric Road in Roanoke. WSLQ's transmitter is off Honeysuckle Road in Bent Mountain.

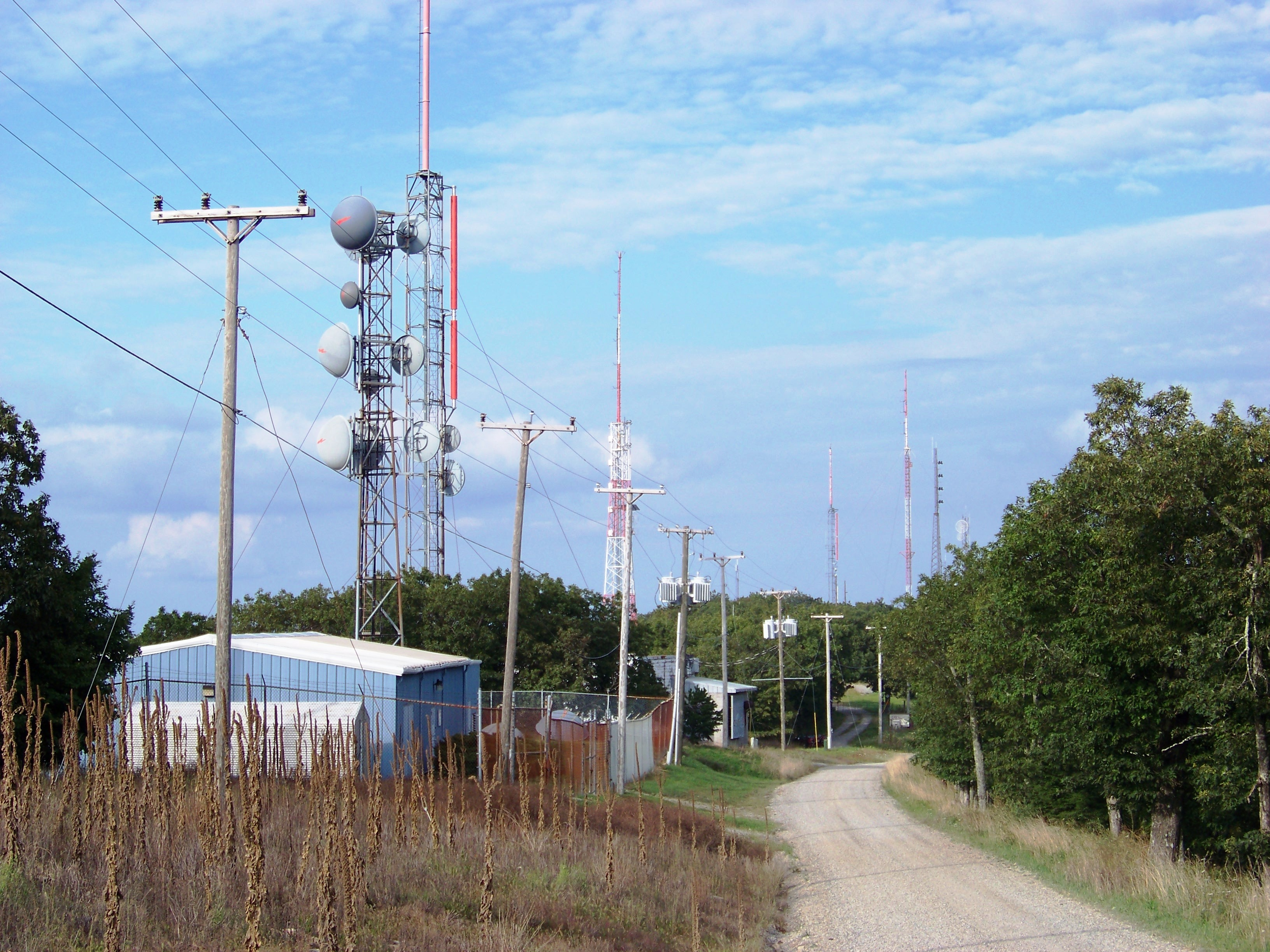
WSLQ's transmitter

WSLQ has one of the largest coverage areas of all FM radio stations in the United States. Its effective radiated power (ERP) is 200,000 watts, broadcasting from a tower at 1,962 feet (598 m) in height above average terrain (HAAT). The Class C signal can be heard into West Virginia and North Carolina, and at times is picked up more than 200 miles away. The station was established in 1947, grandfathered at unusually high wattage before current Federal Communications Commission rules on FM power were set. Today, the top allowable power for FM stations is 100,000 watts.

== History ==
The station first signed on as WSLS-FM on November 1, 1947. It was owned by Roanoke Broadcasting, as the companion to WSLS (610 AM). Roanoke Broadcasting was a subsidiary of the Shenandoah Life Insurance Company and the call letters stood for Shenandoah Life Stations. At first, WSLS-FM ran at 4,700 watts, a small fraction of its current power.

WSLS-FM was the first FM station in the region, going on the air a year ahead of what is today WSLC-FM 94.9. Through its early years, WSLS-FM mostly simulcast WSLS, an affiliate of the ABC Radio Network. In 1952, a TV station was added, WSLS-TV (channel 10). Because the TV station was an NBC affiliate, WSLS-AM-FM switched to NBC Radio affiliation.

By the 1960s, WSLS-FM was operating at 21,000 watts. In 1969, WSLS-AM-FM-TV were bought by Park Communications for $7.5 million. Park also owned stations in New York City, Los Angeles and other large media markets. Park got a giant boost in coverage for WSLS-FM, raising the power to its current 200,000 watts.

Due to Federal Communications Commission regulations against one company owning TV and radio stations in the same market, Park decided to sell the radio stations. In 1972, WSLS and WSLS-FM were bought by Bass Brothers Telecasters, Inc. At that time, stations that were no longer commonly owned were required to have different call signs. With the TV station keeping the WSLS-TV call letters, the radio stations had to change: 99.1 became WSLC-FM in August 1972 and 610 became WSLC. The FM station changed to WSLQ in June 1973.

Mel Wheeler, Inc. purchased the stations in 1976. WSLQ played album rock from the early 1970s until 1983. At that time, WSLQ switched to an adult contemporary format, a sound the station has kept for several decades.
