= Jim Gibbons (sportscaster) =

American sportscaster (1914–2001)

James Leo Gibbons (1914–2001) was an American sportscaster who called Washington Redskins games from 1943 to 1967.

== Early life ==
Gibbons was born on June 3, 1914, in Greeley Center, Nebraska. He attended Creighton University and the University of Omaha. In 1940 he moved to Washington D.C. to work as a comptometer operator at the Social Security Administration. He also took classes at George Washington University and at a radio school.

== Broadcasting career ==
Gibbons began his radio career in 1942 as a part-time employee of WWDC. He joined WMAL in 1943, where he read commercials and provided color commentary for Redskins games. In 1946 he took over WMAL’s morning show, Town Clock. He also hosted WMAL’s Country Store, an annual Christmas drive that collected money and gifts for underprivileged children, called Maryland Terrapins football games, and hosted a weekly golf show on WMAL-TV. In 1953, Gibbons became the Redskins’ play-by-play announcer, calling games on a simulcast for radio and television. In 1955, the simulcasts ended and Gibbons called the TV broadcasts on CBS. In 1957, Gibbons left WMAL for WRC-TV and WOL. From 1960 to 1965, he called college football on ABC Radio.

== Later life ==
During the 1960s, Gibbons began purchasing radio stations. He eventually owned four, WFMD and WFRE in Frederick, Maryland and WPVR-FM and WFIR in Roanoke, Virginia. They were sold in 1999. In 1994, Gibbons was inducted into the Washington Hall of Stars at RFK Stadium. Gibbons died of congestive heart failure on February 13, 2001, at his home in Bethesda, Maryland.
