= WZZU =

- Lynchburg, Virginia; United States
- Broadcast area: Lynchburg metropolitan area
- Frequency: 97.9 MHz
- Branding: 97.3 & 97.9 The Rock Channel

Programming
- Format: Active rock

Ownership
- Owner: Mel Wheeler, Inc.
- Sister stations: WFIR; WPLY; WSLC-FM; WSLQ; WVBB; WVBE-FM; WXLK

History
- First air date: September 1, 1970; 56 years ago
- Former call signs: WLLL-FM (1970–1973); WGOL (1973–1997); WRVX (1997–2000)

Technical information
- Licensing authority: FCC
- Facility ID: 17407
- Class: C3
- ERP: 570 watts
- HAAT: 587 meters (1,926 ft)
- Transmitter coordinates: 37°33′46″N 79°11′38″W
- Repeaters: 92.3 WXLK-HD2 (Roanoke); 100.1 WVBE-HD2 (Lynchburg)

Links
- Public license information: Public file; LMS
- Webcast: Listen live
- Website: www.therockchannelradio.com]

WZZU (97.9 FM) is a commercial radio station licensed to Lynchburg, Virginia. It broadcasts an active rock format and is owned and operated by Mel Wheeler, Inc. The studios and offices are on Electric Road SW in Roanoke, Virginia.

WZZU has an effective radiated power (ERP) of 570 watts. The transmitter is on Mistover Drive in Monroe, Virginia. Programming is also heard in the Roanoke metropolitan area on FM translator W247AD at 97.3 MHz.

== History ==
The station signed on the air on September 1, 1970. Its original call sign was WLLL-FM, broadcasting at 98.3 MHz. It was the FM sister station to WLLL (930 AM). The two stations were owned by the Griffith Broadcasting Corporation. At first, WLLL-FM simulcast WLLL. Later, it had an automated oldies format, with its WGOL call letters standing for "Golden Oldies". In 1997, the call sign switched to WRVX.

In 2000, it changed its call sign to WZZU, airing a classic rock format. On April 19, 2021, WZZU segued from classic rock to mainstream rock, branded as "The Rock Channel".

Currently the station is programmed and formatted to play Active Rock, showcasing new hard rock.
