= WXLK =

Contemporary hit radio station in Roanoke, Virginia

- Roanoke, Virginia; United States
- Broadcast area: New River Valley; Southwest Virginia
- Frequency: 92.3 MHz (HD Radio)
- Branding: K92

Programming
- Language: English
- Format: Contemporary hit radio
- Subchannels: HD2: WZZU simulcast (Active rock)

Ownership
- Owner: Mel Wheeler, Inc.
- Sister stations: WFIR; WSLC-FM; WSLQ; WVBB; WPLY; WVBE-FM; WZZU

History
- First air date: December 17, 1960
- Former call signs: WLRJ (1960–1973); WLRG (1973–1980)

Technical information
- Licensing authority: FCC
- Facility ID: 9692
- Class: C
- ERP: 100,000 watts
- HAAT: 605 meters (1,985 ft)
- Transmitter coordinates: 37°11′51.4″N 80°9′9.1″W
- Translator: See § HD Radio

Links
- Public license information: Public file; LMS
- Webcast: Listen live
- Website: www.k92radio.com

WXLK (92.3 FM "K92") is a commercial radio station licensed to Roanoke, Virginia, serving the New River Valley and Southwest Virginia. WXLK airs a contemporary hit radio format and is owned and operated by Mel Wheeler, Inc.

WXLK's studios and offices are on Electric Road in Roanoke. Its transmitter is on Honeysuckle Road in Bent Mountain. WXLK broadcasts in the HD Radio format. The station runs at 100,000 watts effective radiated power (ERP) on a tower 1,985 feet in height above average terrain (HAAT). The Class C station can be heard into North Carolina and West Virginia. At times it can be picked up more than 200 miles away.

== History ==
On December 17, 1960, the station first signed on as WLRJ. It was owned by Lee Hartman & Sons, a company headquartered in Roanoke that still provides audio and video services, although it no longer owns a radio station. WLRJ ran at only 2,800 watts, a fraction of its current power.

The station specialized in what it called "fine music" including middle of the road artists. WLRJ was an affiliate of the ABC-FM Network. It was a rare "stand alone" FM station, with no AM counterpart.

In 1972, the station was bought by CEBE Investments. CEBE switched the format to beautiful music. With the new call letters WLRG, the station called itself "Large Radio - Always Beautiful".

Contemporary hit radio "K92" debuted on January 1, 1980. Future WVTF general manager Glenn Gleixner, then a DJ at the station, came up with the branding and callsign – picking K because he believed it was the most memorable letter, and including an X in homage to WIXL in Newton, New Jersey, where he previously worked.

Throughout the 1980s, WXLK is an affiliate of Casey Kasem's American Top 40 (since January 1981), the Rick Dees Weekly Top 40, and Dan Ingram's Top 40 Satellite Survey.

In 1997, the station was acquired by its current owner, Mel Wheeler, Inc. The price tag was $7.5 million for both WXLK and 100.1 WLYK in Lynchburg, which at the time simulcast WXLK. (WLYK is now WVBE-FM, which airs an urban adult contemporary format).

Over the years, K92 launched many of its on-air personalities into major market radio, including Eddie Haskell, David Lee Michaels, Cat Thomas, Sonny Joe Stevens, Marc Anthony, Ellis B Feaster, Blair Carter & Jeffrey T. Mason.

== HD Radio ==
HD Radio subchannel WXLK-HD2 debuted as mainstream rock formatted "97.3 & 98.5 The Rock Channel" on December 31, 2017. The subchannel is paired with two FM broadcast translators to provide reception on analog radios:

Call sign	Frequency	City of license	FID	ERP (W)	HAAT	Class	FCC info	Notes
W247AD	97.3 FM	Roanoke, Virginia	67688	99	219 m (719 ft)	D	LMS	Relays HD2
