= WVBB =

Radio station in Elliston-Lafayette, Virginia

Simulcasts WVBE-FM, Lynchburg, VA
- Elliston-Lafayette, Virginia; United States
- Broadcast area: Roanoke metropolitan area
- Frequency: 97.7 MHz
- Branding: The Vibe 100.1 & 97.7

Programming
- Format: Urban adult contemporary
- Affiliations: Premiere Networks

Ownership
- Owner: Mel Wheeler, Inc.
- Sister stations: WFIR; WSLC-FM; WSLQ; WPLY; WVBE-FM; WXLK; WZZU

History
- First air date: 1983
- Former call signs: WRON-FM (1983–2008); WKCJ (2008–2011)
- Call sign meaning: Vibe

Technical information
- Licensing authority: FCC
- Facility ID: 54597
- Class: A
- ERP: 260 watts
- HAAT: 470 meters (1,540 ft)
- Transmitter coordinates: 37°18′30″N 80°9′46″W

Links
- Public license information: Public file; LMS
- Webcast: Listen live
- Website: www.thevibe.fm

WVBB (97.7 FM) is a commercial radio station licensed to Elliston-Lafayette, Virginia, United States, and serving the Roanoke metropolitan area. Owned by Mel Wheeler, Inc., the station airs an urban adult contemporary format simulcast with WVBE-FM in Lynchburg, with studios on Electric Road in Roanoke.

WVBB's transmitter is sited off Mountain Park Drive in Salem, Virginia, on Fort Lewis Mountain.

== History ==
The station signed on the air in 1983. Its original call sign was WRON-FM.

All Access reported on September 20, 2007, that Todd P. Robinson, Inc.'s WKCJ would be swapped to Radio Greenbrier, Inc. for WRON-FM (now on 103.1). The swap took place on August 1, 2008. WKCJ applied to move its city of license south to Elliston-Lafayette, and put its tower on Fort Lewis Mountain, about 10 miles east of Roanoke.

The swap ensured that when Todd P. Robinson, Inc. moved the 97.7 frequency, WRON-FM 103.1 would continue to serve Greenbrier County, West Virginia.

On Wednesday, July 13, 2011, Roanoke, Virginia–based Mel Wheeler, Inc. agreed to purchase the station for $675,000. A new application was filed to move the signal to Elliston-Lafayette, on Fort Lewis Mountain, broadcasting 260 watts, but from a height of 1,542 feet (470 m).

On December 2, 2011, Mel Wheeler, Inc. took ownership and control of WKCJ and began simulcasting the urban adult contemporary format also on WVBE-FM 100.1 in Lynchburg, Virginia. On December 9, 2011, the call sign on 97.7 was changed to WVBB. The station has been an almost fulltime simulcast of WVBE since then. It breaks off to serve as the Roanoke-area network affiliate for Virginia Cavaliers football and men's basketball.
