= WSLS-TV =

Television station in Roanoke, Virginia

- Roanoke–Lynchburg, Virginia; United States
- City: Roanoke, Virginia
- Channels: Digital: 34 (UHF); Virtual: 10
- Branding: WSLS 10; 10 News

Programming
- Affiliations: 10.1: NBC; for others, see § Subchannels

Ownership
- Owner: Graham Media Group; (Graham Media Group, Virginia, LLC)

History
- Founded: December 11, 1952
- Former channel numbers: Analog: 10 (VHF, 1952–2009); Digital: 30 (UHF, 2002–2019)
- Former affiliations: CBS (secondary, 1952–1955); ABC (secondary, 1953–1955); DuMont (secondary, 1953–1954)
- Call sign meaning: Shenandoah Life Station (reference to original owner)

Technical information
- Licensing authority: FCC
- Facility ID: 57840
- ERP: 1,000 kW
- HAAT: 608.7 m (1,997 ft)
- Transmitter coordinates: 37°12′3.3″N 80°8′52.8″W

Links
- Public license information: Public file; LMS
- Website: www.wsls.com

WSLS-TV (channel 10) is a television station licensed to Roanoke, Virginia, United States, serving the Roanoke–Lynchburg market as an affiliate of NBC. Owned by Graham Media Group, the station maintains studios on Fifth Street in Roanoke, and its transmitter is located on Poor Mountain in Roanoke County.

== History ==
WSLS-TV first signed on the air on December 11, 1952, by the Shenandoah Life Insurance Company, after which the station was named ("Shenandoah Life Stations"). WSLS-TV was co-owned with two of the first radio stations in Roanoke, Virginia, WSLS (610 AM) and WSLS-FM 99.1. It is the third-oldest continuously operating station in Virginia, behind Richmond's WTVR-TV and Norfolk's WTKR, as well as the state's oldest station west of Richmond.

Rights to channel 10 were granted to Shenandoah Life after a competitive battle was fought between Shenandoah Life, WROV, and WDBJ. Originally set to fully launch on December 10, 1952, WSLS-TV was taken off the air an hour into a test pattern that evening, when a storm shattered a window in the studio and blew a control panel's fuse, while a lightning bolt also struck near the station's transmitter. The station successfully launched a day later. The inaugural anchor team was composed of Tom Wright, Joe Moffatt, and Ed Thomas, with Moffatt becoming the state's first television editorialist when he began his daily editorials in 1961.

In 1955, WSLS-TV moved from the Shenandoah Building on First Street to a new studio on Third Street.

The television station has always been a primary NBC affiliate, but in its first two years spent around one-quarter of its broadcast day carrying programs from CBS; Lynchburg-based WLVA-TV (channel 13, now WSET-TV) was the nearest primary CBS affiliate, but its transmitter location at the time did not cover Roanoke at all. One day after the 1953 demise of the market's proposed ABC affiliate, WROV-TV (channel 27), WSLS-TV picked up a secondary affiliation with that network; it also aired National Football League coverage from the DuMont Network from 1952 through 1954. All non-NBC programming was dropped in 1955 when DuMont ceased operations, WDBJ-TV (channel 7) signed on from Roanoke as the area's primary CBS affiliate, and WLVA-TV signed on a new transmitter halfway between Roanoke and Lynchburg and took the market's primary ABC affiliation. In the late-1950s and the 1960s, WSLS-TV also aired locally produced programming, including Echo, Klub Kwiz (a competitor to WDBJ's Klassroom Kwiz), Ebb and Andy, Spectrum, Glen Howell, Cactus Joe, and Profile.

The station was first to broadcast in "full living color", telecast from a remote location, use video tape and electronic news gathering equipment, broadcast network programming in stereo, and broadcast live local news in HD in the Roanoke/Lynchburg market.

In 1969, WSLS-TV was purchased from Shenandoah Life Insurance Company by Roy H. Park for $7.5 million. This separated it from its radio sister; due to Federal Communications Commission (FCC) rules which at the time prohibited separately-owned stations from sharing a call sign, the television station was the only one to retain the original WSLS call sign.

In 1992, WSLS-TV launched "The Spirit of Virginia" promotional campaign, emphasizing the station's new "down home" news philosophy that included more features and a stronger emphasis on soft, community oriented news. In September 1995, WSLS-TV ended "The Spirit of Virginia" campaign and revamped the look and focus of the station, shedding the "down home" philosophy in favor of a more hard-news approach. In 1996, WSLS-TV signed a deal with Grant Broadcasting, the owner of Roanoke's Fox affiliates WFXR and WJPR, to produce a 10 p.m. newscast for the Fox stations. The Fox 10 O'Clock News with Frances Scott and John Carlin premiered on October 28, 1996.

On January 1, 1997, Media General acquired Park Communications and became the station's new owner. The station was rebranded to match WFLA-TV, Media General's flagship station in Tampa, Florida. On April 14, WSLS-TV re-launched itself as NewsChannel 10 during the 5 p.m. newscast. A new campaign called "10 Listens" was launched, which encouraged viewers to set up a "10 Listens Community Forum". Through the forums, viewers communicated directly with its news anchors and management about concerns facing their community, yielding exclusive story ideas for WSLS-TV and improved its image within the market. A combination of factors caused the station to eventually abandon the forum concept. In 1999, Media General began the process of renovating the WSLS-TV studios in downtown Roanoke, moving the station's news department to a larger newsroom on the first floor adjacent to the news studio. On October 1, 2015, the news sharing agreement between WSLS-TV and WFXR ended when the latter launched its own in-house news department.

On January 27, 2016, Media General announced that it would be acquired by Nexstar Broadcasting Group in a deal valued at $4.6 billion. Since Nexstar already owned WFXR and WWCW through satellite exemptions and the Roanoke–Lynchburg market had too few stations to permit a duopoly, on May 27, Nexstar announced that it would sell WSLS, along with WCWJ in Jacksonville, Florida, to the Graham Media Group for $120 million. The sale was approved by the FCC on January 11, 2017, and completed on January 17.

In February 2018, WSLS-TV announced it had purchased a warehouse on Fifth Street to build a new television studio and would sell its existing Third Street facilities upon moving into the new building. On April 29, 2019, the new studio made its on-air debut.

== Programming ==
WSLS-TV has produced several local talk shows throughout its history. In the 1950s, Betty Bond, often referred to as Roanoke's "first lady of television" and wife of American author Nelson S. Bond, hosted Roanoke's first local television talk show, The Betty Bond Show. She interviewed notable locals on the women-oriented program and also shared fashion tips and household interests, among other topics. In the early 1960s, Priscilla Young and Kit Johnson hosted Profile, which was awarded "Best Women's Program" in 1962 by the Virginia Associated Press Broadcasters. In 1983, Greta Evans was hired at WSLS-TV as a reporter and community affairs coordinator to host Reaching Out, a community affairs program examining community issues that aired monthly on Sundays. In March 2010, Natalie Faunce, a former anchor from WFXR, and Jay Prater, a radio disc jockey from WROV-FM, helped launch Our Blue Ridge, an entertainment-oriented talk show focusing on community and lifestyle news that replaced the traditional hour-long noon newscast. However, in February 2011, WSLS-TV announced it would revamp Our Blue Ridge by renaming it Daytime Blue Ridge, with continued discussion of similar topics along a more heightened emphasis on the community. Mike Wilson, a former minister, replaced Prater and joined Faunce as co-host. The revamp premiered in September 2011. Daytime Blue Ridge was condensed by 30 minutes in November 2014 and began airing at 12:30 p.m.

=== News operation ===
WSLS-TV presently broadcasts 31 hours of locally produced newscasts each week (with five hours each weekday and three hours each on Saturdays and Sundays).

In 1989, the station debuted First News at 5:30, which was solo-anchored by John Carlin and included live feature segments from a field reporter. The show was not popular at first, though ratings improved in 1992 when it was moved to 5 p.m. On September 21, 1998, it was moved back to 5:30, though returned to 5 p.m. in February 2002. In August 2004, WSLS added a 5:30 newscast to the existing 5 and 6 p.m. shows, creating the first 90-minute evening news block in the market. A half-hour 7 p.m. show was added in September 2009. The 1997 rebranding of the station's news operation as NewsChannel 10 coincided with the debut of "Storm Team 10". The "Storm Team" was created to give weather a stronger emphasis on the station and to emphasize that meteorologists were a team, with the title of "chief meteorologist" being dropped. The title of "chief meteorologist" would later be brought back with the addition of weathercaster Ros Runner in 2007. After the station's acquisition by Media General in 1997, several investments were made to improve the station's news coverage. One of these was the purchase of a satellite news gathering truck so that the station would no longer have to rent or borrow equipment from other stations for satellite live shots. Several departures in the late 1990s and early 2000s harmed the reputation of the station, including the firing of news anchor Dave Mellon and Chief Meteorologist Chuck Bell in 1999, the resignation of Sports Director Greg Roberts the same year, and the dismissal of evening co-anchor Barbara Gibbs in 2000.

A renewed emphasis was placed on local news in the early 2000s, particularly in the eastern and southern portions of the Roanoke–Lynchburg market. In the spring of 2001, additional news bureaus were established in Martinsville and Bedford, each with its own reporter and photographer. The Martinsville bureau was intended to cover Henry County, Pittsylvania County, Halifax County, and the independent cities that lied within those areas, while the Bedford Bureau covered Bedford County, Campbell County, Amherst County, and the independent cities of Lynchburg and Bedford. In 2004, the personnel from the two bureaus were moved to the offices of the Lynchburg News and Advance and the Danville Register and Bee, respectively, in an attempt by Media General to converge its newspaper and television properties as a single newsgathering entity. Between 2008 and 2012, coverage of these areas was maintained through shared content from its newspaper partners. When Media General sold its newspapers to World Media Enterprises in 2012, the partnership with WSLS ended and the station was forced to rely on its own resources to cover the eastern side of its market.

In 2007, the on-air branding was changed from the NewsChannel to "WSLS 10 On Your Side", with the station updating its set and graphics for the launch of high-definition. The station launched the first high-definition local newscast in Virginia that year. In the beginning of the 2010s, WSLS-TV implemented several changes to its news programming. In March 2010, the weekday noon newscast was replaced with Our Blue Ridge. The change had not been met with ratings success and Our Blue Ridge was revamped, being replaced by Daytime Blue Ridge in 2011. For the fall 2011 and spring 2012 sweeps periods, WSLS-TV placed third against Roanoke competitors, WDBJ and WSET, in its prime time newscasts. The "On Your Side" slogan was also dropped in 2012, along with a change to the newscast's graphics. In July 2013, after anchor Jay Warren departed in April, former anchor John Carlin returned to the station after five years in public relations to anchor the 5, 5:30, 6, and 11 p.m. newscasts. On November 3, 2014, WSLS-TV brought back its weekday noon newscast with the launch of WSLS 10 at Noon, anchored by Patrick McKee. The newscast's return shortened Daytime Blue Ridge by 30 minutes to begin airing at 12:30 p.m.

Following its acquisition by Graham Media Group in early 2017, WSLS-TV introduced new station graphics and a new music score and also rebranded as 10 News, with the new slogan, "Working for You".

== Technical information ==
=== Subchannels ===
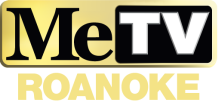
Logo for DT3 subchannel

The station's signal is multiplexed:

Subchannels of WSLS-TV
Subchannel	Res.	Short name	Programming
10.1	1080i	WSLS-HD	NBC
10.2	480i	GetTV	Great (4:3)
10.3	480i	MeTV	MeTV
10.4	480i	StartTV	Start TV
10.5	480i	Movies	Movies!

On digital subchannel 10.2 and Cox digital channel 110 is "WSLS 10.2 GO", which carries Great Entertainment Television (formerly branded as getTV), a digital multicast network owned by Sony Pictures Television Networks which broadcasts classic television programs; previously, WSLS-DT2 aired a continuous image of "Live VIPIR 10". On digital subchannel 10.3 and Cox digital channel 111 is MeTV, offering classic television series.

=== Analog-to-digital conversion ===
WSLS-TV ended regular programming on its analog signal, over VHF channel 10, on June 12, 2009, the official date on which full-power television stations in the United States transitioned from analog to digital broadcasts under federal mandate. The station's digital signal remained on its pre-transition UHF channel 30, using virtual channel 10.
