= New River Community College =

College in Dublin, Virginia, U.S.

- Type: Public community college
- Established: 1959
- Parent institution: Virginia Community College System
- Endowment: $1,879,747
- Faculty: 206 (51 full-time, 155 part-time)
- Undergraduates: 4,345
- Location: Dublin, Virginia, United States; 37°06′20.8″N 80°41′54.2″W
- Website: www.nr.edu

New River Community College (NRCC) is a public community college in Dublin, Virginia, in the New River Valley of southwestern Virginia. It is one of the 23 colleges in the Virginia Community College System. NRCC's service region covers the counties of Montgomery, Floyd, Pulaski and Giles and the city of Radford.

== Campus ==
The main campus consists of four buildings and is located on a 100-acre site in Dublin. The college also maintains a STEM-centered campus at the New River Valley Mall in Christiansburg. NRCC campuses provide technical and vocational programs as well as university-parallel programs.

== History ==
NRCC opened as New River Vocational-Technical School in 1959 and came under the jurisdiction of the VCCS in 1966. It was originally located in the City of Radford, in the old Belle Hethe Elementary School Building. The school's name was changed in late 1969. In November of that same year, the newly named New River Community College broke ground in Dublin. Currently, the college has an average enrollment of approximately 5,000 students.

The college's current president is Patricia B. Huber, who has served in that capacity since 2017. She is the fifth president and first woman to hold that position.

=== 2013 shooting incident ===
On April 12, 2013, a gunman opened fire with a shotgun at a satellite campus at the New River Valley Mall in Christiansburg, Virginia, wounding two women. The suspect, an 18-year-old named Neil MacInnis, was detained and charged with two counts of use of a firearm during the commission of a felony and two counts of malicious wounding. MacInnis studied at the Christiansburg campus and reportedly threatened the shooting on 4chan minutes before the attack. On April 16, 2014, he pleaded guilty and was sentenced to 38 years in prison.
