= WSET-TV =

Television station in Lynchburg, Virginia

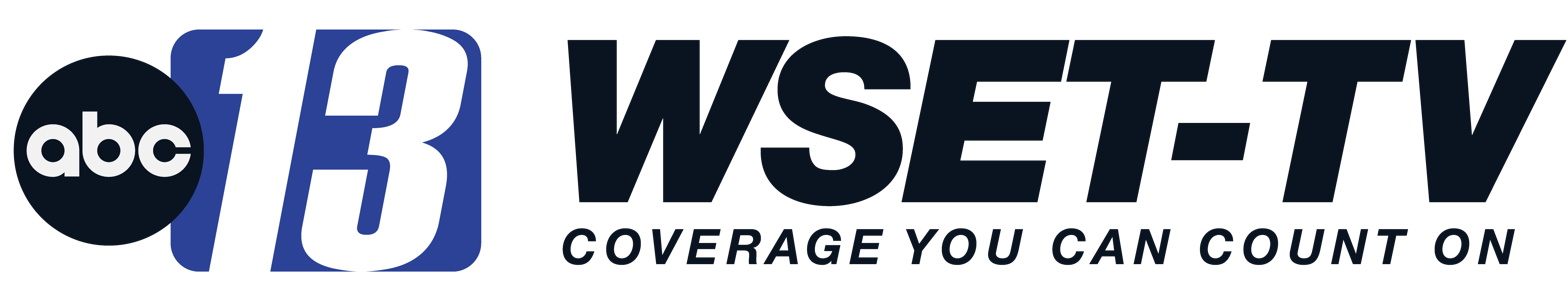

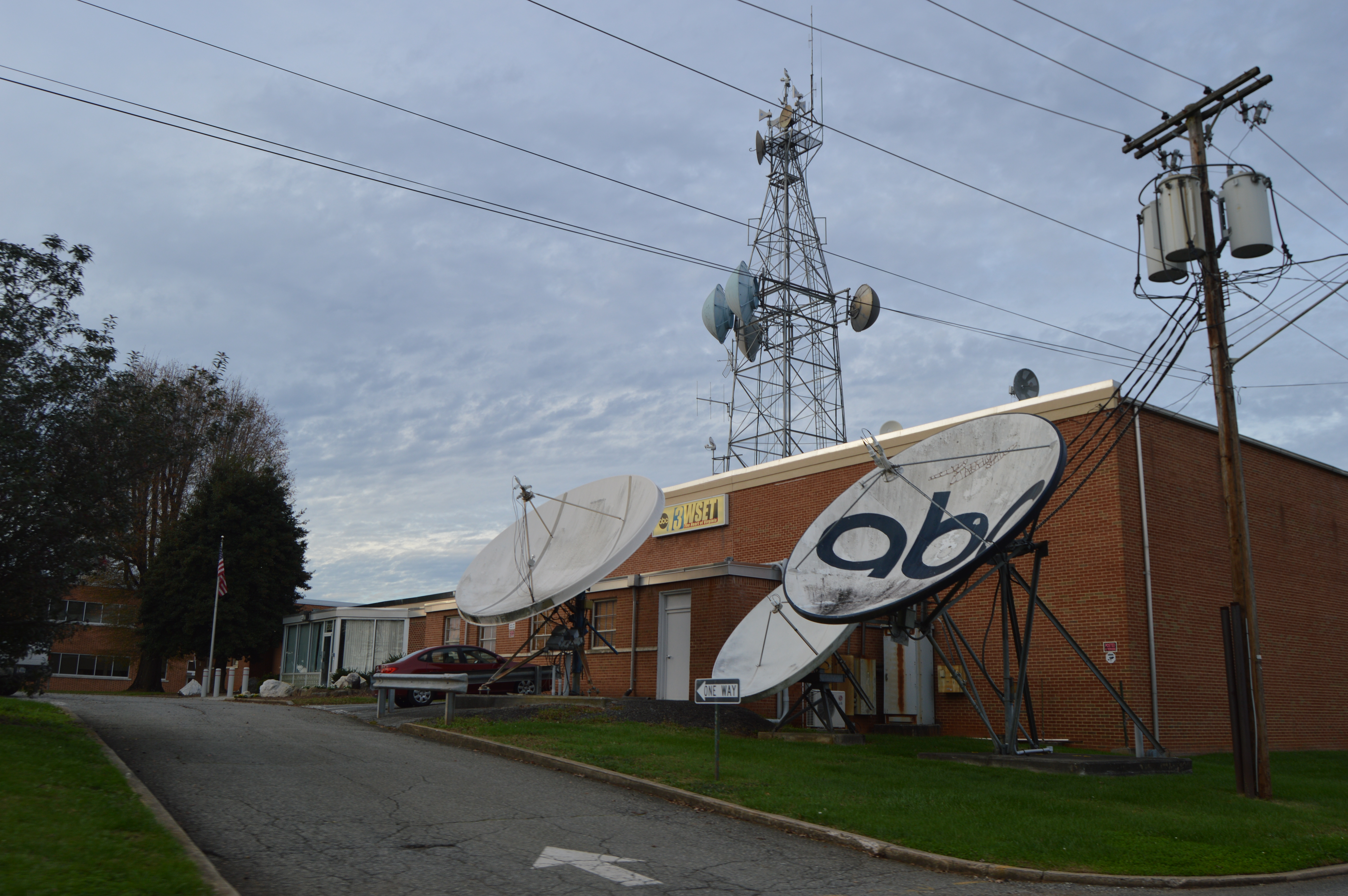
- Studios in Lynchburg
- Lynchburg–Roanoke, Virginia; United States
- City: Lynchburg, Virginia
- Channels: Digital: 7 (VHF); Virtual: 13
- Branding: ABC 13

Programming
- Affiliations: 13.1: ABC; for others, see § Subchannels

Ownership
- Owner: Sinclair Broadcast Group; (WSET Licensee, LLC)

History
- Founded: February 8, 1953
- Former call signs: WLVA-TV (1953–1977)
- Former channel numbers: Analog: 13 (VHF, 1953–2009); Digital: 34 (UHF, 2003–2009), 13 (VHF, 2009–2020)
- Former affiliations: CBS (1953–1955); ABC (secondary, 1953–1955)
- Call sign meaning: Television set

Technical information
- Licensing authority: FCC
- Facility ID: 73988
- ERP: 40 kW
- HAAT: 627 m (2,057 ft)
- Transmitter coordinates: 37°18′55″N 79°38′5″W
- Translator(s): W05AA-D Roanoke

Links
- Public license information: Public file; LMS
- Website: wset.com

WSET-TV (channel 13) is a television station licensed to Lynchburg, Virginia, United States, serving as the ABC affiliate for the Roanoke–Lynchburg market. The station is owned by Sinclair Broadcast Group, and has studios on Langhorne Road in Lynchburg; its transmitter is located atop Thaxton Mountain, near Thaxton, Virginia.

== History ==
Channel 13 began operations on February 8, 1953, as WLVA-TV from a transmitter on Tobacco Row Mountain west of Sweet Briar. The station was owned by Lynchburg Broadcasting Corporation, which also owned WLVA radio (580 AM). The station's footprint reached as far as Charlottesville, where residents reported good reception during testing, from this transmitter site. The station was originally a CBS affiliate, but also carried programs from ABC, NBC, and DuMont as well.

By the end of 1954, Roanoke and Lynchburg had been collapsed into a single market. Accordingly, channel 13 built a new transmitter in Evington in order to improve its coverage of Roanoke and the western part of the market. Since Roanoke was already served by NBC affiliate WSLS-TV (channel 10), WLVA-TV opted to become a primary ABC affiliate—Virginia's first, and the longest-tenured south of Washington, D.C. WLVA-TV and WSLS-TV split CBS programming until WDBJ-TV (channel 7) signed on from Roanoke in 1955.

Channel 13 spent its first 30 years in a battle to improve its reception in the market's more rugged western portion. While its transmitter in Evington provided a city-grade signal to most of the market's eastern portion, it was roughly 35 miles (56 km) from Roanoke proper, portions of which were shielded by mountains. As a result, the station's signal was spotty at best in portions of Roanoke, and could not be seen at all in much of the market's western portion. The station made numerous requests to move its transmitter closer to Roanoke. However, they were all turned down by the Federal Communications Commission (FCC) in order to protect WLOS-TV in Asheville, North Carolina, and WHTN-TV (now WOWK-TV) in Huntington, West Virginia. In particular, the FCC believed that the Roanoke–Lynchburg and Huntington–Charleston markets were close enough that the two channel 13 transmitters had to be as far apart as possible to avoid interference. Its signal was so weak in Roanoke that ABC granted an affiliation to a second station in the market, WRFT-TV (channel 27), from 1966 through 1975.

In the early 1960s, the station set up translator W05AA to improve its signal in Roanoke. WLVA-TV was not alone in installing low-VHF Roanoke translators; the early 1960s also saw W02AE put on the air to translate WSLS-TV and W04AG put on the air to translate WDBJ-TV. In 1965, Lynchburg Broadcasting merged with the Washington Star Company, which also owned WMAL-AM-FM-TV in Washington. In 1970, the Star Company sought to move WLVA-TV's transmitter to Poor Mountain overlooking Roanoke, where the other major stations in the market operated their transmitters. This was once again turned down by the FCC, in order to protect WRFT-TV and WHTN-TV.

Joe Allbritton purchased a controlling interest in the Star in 1975. By this time, however, the FCC had tightened its rules on cross-media ownership. Due to the manner in which Allbritton's takeover was structured, the FCC considered it to be an ownership change. It told Allbritton that he had to sell off either the radio or television stations. Allbritton chose to sell off the company's non-television assets, including WLVA radio, in April 1977. He then reorganized the Star Company's former television division as Allbritton Communications.

On August 17, 1977, WLVA-TV changed its call letters to the current WSET-TV. The change was brought on by a now-repealed FCC regulation that stated that TV and radio stations in the same market, but with different ownership that must have different call signs. The station's new calls originated from television set and management wanting an easily remembered and marketable set of call letters, which would be taken advantage of in the mid-80s for the station's news branding of the time, Newset 13, a portmanteau which contains WSET consecutively.

Allbritton immediately set about finding a solution to channel 13's longstanding reception problems in the western portion of the market. In 1980, WSET won FCC approval to relocate its transmitter to Thaxton Mountain near Bedford, halfway between Roanoke and Lynchburg. WSET activated its new transmitter in 1982, which gave the station a clear signal in most of Roanoke for the first time ever, though with the caveat of its signal range being significantly conformed to protect WOWK. As a result, some areas of the western part of the market, including parts of Roanoke itself, only received a grade B signal, depending on other means of reception for a clear signal from WSET. The channel 5 translator remains in operation to serve the few viewers in the market's western portion without access to cable or satellite, which are all but essential for acceptable television in this part of the market, and is unusual in the digital age for not having any change of calls or channel position since its launch.

Beginning in October 2005, it was one of only two ABC affiliates in the Eastern Time Zone to air ABC's World News Tonight at 7 p.m.; WSB-TV in Atlanta is the other. However, WSET has returned the national program to the 6:30 p.m. time slot, shifting its local newscast to 7 p.m.

Allbritton, and in turn, WSET, was acquired by Sinclair Broadcast Group, in August 2014.

== Once and Again controversy ==
On March 11, 2002, WSET preempted an episode of Once and Again, "The Gay-Straight Alliance", which contained a scene in which two female characters kiss one another, and ran a prime time infomercial instead. WSET was the only ABC affiliate to preempt the episode. The decision, which station management refused to explain, provoked condemnation from GLAAD. Jerry Falwell's local influence and pressure through Thomas Road Baptist Church and Liberty University (where he was the founder and chancellor) was a probable factor, as Randy Smith, the station's general manager, was a member of Thomas Road, with Falwell commending and defending Smith's decision, which was said to be based on broader concerns about the episode's content and a student-teacher relationship plotline rather than solely the kiss, in a newsletter to the Liberty community. Falwell also noted the station had aired "The Puppy Episode" of Ellen where Ellen DeGeneres's title character came out, and other ABC programs with LGBTQ+ characters to defend Smith's decision on broader content concerns.

== News operation ==
WSET presently broadcasts 27 hours of locally produced newscasts each week (with five hours each weekday and one hour each on Saturdays and Sundays). Its newscasts primarily focus on the eastern part of the Roanoke–Lynchburg market.

On September 12, 2011, WSET began broadcasting its local newscasts in high definition, the station is the third in the Roanoke–Lynchburg market to make the transition to HD.

Former Good Morning America co-host and ABC World News anchor Charles Gibson began his television career at the station; he was a reporter/anchor for WLVA-TV during the late 1960s.

=== Notable former on-air staff ===
- Mona Kosar Abdi – reporter (2014–2017)
- Charles Gibson – reporter/anchor (WLVA-TV, late 1960s)

== Technical information ==
=== Subchannels ===
The station's signal is multiplexed:

Subchannels of WSET-TV
Subchannel	Res.	Short name	Programming
13.1	720p	ABC	ABC
13.2	480i	Charge!	Charge!
13.3	480i	Comet	Comet
13.4	480i	ROAR	Roar
24.1	1080i	WZBJ24	MyNetworkTV (WZBJ-CD)

Broadcast on behalf of another station

=== Analog-to-digital conversion ===
WSET-TV ended regular programming on its analog signal, over VHF channel 13, on June 12, 2009, the official date on which full-power television stations in the United States transitioned from analog to digital broadcasts under federal mandate. In October 2009, the station's digital signal relocated from its pre-transition UHF channel 34 to VHF channel 13. The station's over-the-air coverage in much of the western part of the market, especially the New River Valley, is somewhat marginal due in part to the mountainous terrain. W05AA was converted to digital operation in late 2009, which helped to fill in coverage holes in Roanoke.

=== Translator ===
- W05AA-D Roanoke
