= WVBE-FM =

- Lynchburg, Virginia; United States
- Broadcast area: Metro Lynchburg
- Frequency: 100.1 MHz (HD Radio)
- Branding: The Vibe 100.1 & 97.7

Programming
- Format: Urban adult contemporary
- Subchannels: HD2: Active rock (WZZU)
- Affiliations: Premiere Networks

Ownership
- Owner: Mel Wheeler, Inc.
- Sister stations: WFIR; WPLY; WSLC-FM; WSLQ; WVBB; WXLK; WZZU

History
- First air date: 1948
- Former call signs: WWOD-FM (1948–1979); WKZZ (1979–1991); WLYK (1991–2001); WVBE (2001–2002)
- Call sign meaning: ViBE

Technical information
- Licensing authority: FCC
- Facility ID: 9690
- Class: C3
- ERP: 20,000 watts
- HAAT: 100 meters (330 ft)
- Transmitter coordinates: 37°27′0″N 79°4′29″W
- Translator: HD2: 98.5 W253BT (Madison Heights)
- Repeater: 97.7 WVBB (Elliston-Lafayette)

Links
- Public license information: Public file; LMS
- Webcast: Listen live
- Website: www.thevibe.fm

WVBE-FM (100.1 FM, "The Vibe") is a commercial radio station licensed to Lynchburg, Virginia, United States, and serving Metro Lynchburg. It is owned by Mel Wheeler, Inc., with studios and offices on Electric Road in Roanoke. WVBE-FM and WVBB in Elliston-Lafayette, Virginia, simulcast an urban adult contemporary format, with WVBB serving the Roanoke metropolitan area.

WVBE-FM's transmitter is sited on Country Living Lane in Madison Heights, near U.S. Route 29 (Monacan Parkway). WVBE-FM broadcasts in HD Radio; the HD-2 digital subchannel carries an active rock format, simulcasting WZZU.

== History ==
=== WWOD-FM ===
The station signed on the air in 1948 as the first FM station in Lynchburg. Its original call sign was WWOD-FM, powered at 940 watts. It simulcast the programming of its sister station, WWOD (1390 AM). WWOD went on the air the year before, as Lynchburg's second AM radio station after WLVA. WWOD-AM-FM were network affiliates of the Mutual Broadcasting System.

As network programming moved from radio to television, WWOD-AM-FM began broadcasting a full service radio format of middle of the road and country music plus news and sports with some Christian radio shows on the schedule. FM 100.1's power was boosted to 3,000 watts.

=== Country and Top 40 ===
FM 100.1 started its own format, becoming WKZZ, on May 12, 1979. WKZZ played automated country music. On April 1, 1984, it became a locally programmed Top 40 station. It kept that format for seven years.

On November 21, 1991, the station was purchased by Aylett Coleman of Roanoke and began a simulcast with contemporary hit radio station WXLK "K92" in Roanoke. The simulcast was designed to provide an improved signal for K92 in Metro Lynchburg. It took the call sign WLYK, which stood for "Lynchburg's K92". The following year, WLYK boosted power to 20,000 watts, going from a Class A to Class C3 station. WLYK and WXLK were sold a few years after Coleman's death to Mel Wheeler Inc.

=== 100.1 The Vibe ===
On April 19, 2001, the station became Vibe 100, with an R&B format. It changed its call letters to WVBE-FM on March 13, 2002. The change was necessitated by the addition of 610 AM as a Roanoke-based simulcast signal for "Vibe 100", which took the calls WVBE. In 2016, the simulcast ended when WVBE AM flipped to sports. WVBE-FM got a new simulcast partner in the Roanoke area when WVBB 97.7 started airing the same urban AC programming.

On January 20, 2016, WVBE-FM started using HD Radio technology in its broadcasts. The HD-2 subchannel began carrying "The Rock Channel," a mainstream rock format.
