= WPXR-TV =

Television station in Roanoke, Virginia

- Roanoke–Lynchburg, Virginia; United States
- City: Roanoke, Virginia
- Channels: Digital: 27 (UHF); Virtual: 38

Programming
- Affiliations: 38.1: Ion Television; for others, see § Subchannels

Ownership
- Owner: Ion Media; (Ion Media License Company, LLC)

History
- Founded: May 23, 1983
- First air date: January 3, 1986
- Former call signs: WEFC (1986–1998)
- Former channel numbers: Analog: 38 (UHF, 1986–2009); Digital: 36 (UHF, 2002–2019)
- Former affiliations: Religious (1986–1997); inTV (1997–1998)
- Call sign meaning: Pax TV Roanoke

Technical information
- Licensing authority: FCC
- Facility ID: 70251
- ERP: 609 kW
- HAAT: 623.6 m (2,046 ft)
- Transmitter coordinates: 37°11′56″N 80°9′0″W

Links
- Public license information: Public file; LMS
- Website: iontelevision.com

WPXR-TV (channel 38) is a television station licensed to Roanoke, Virginia, United States, broadcasting the Ion Television network to the Roanoke–Lynchburg market. The station is owned by the Ion Media subsidiary of the E. W. Scripps Company, and maintains a transmitter atop Poor Mountain in unincorporated southwestern Roanoke County.

== History ==
The station signed on January 3, 1986, as WEFC, a religious station owned by Evangel Foursquare Church (hence the call letters). It was the first non-network affiliated station in Roanoke, and the first new UHF station in the market to sign on following the demise of WRLU channel 27 nearly 11 years earlier. Coincidentally, a new channel 27, under the calls of WVFT, would sign on two months after WEFC, carrying a similar format.

Paxson Communications bought the station in 1997 and made it part of the all-infomercial inTV network. It joined Pax TV (later i: Independent Television and now Ion Television) on the network's launch in 1998.

== Newscasts ==
From September 1996 until August 1997, WDBJ produced a 10 p.m. newscast, News 7 Primetime, for WEFC; the newscast was canceled due to low ratings. From 2000 to 2005, WPXR aired rebroadcasts of WSLS-TV's newscasts as part of a joint sales agreement between Paxson Communications and WSLS owner Media General.

== Technical information ==
=== Subchannels ===
The station's signal is multiplexed:

Subchannels of WPXR-TV
Subchannel	Res.	Short name	Programming
38.1	720p	ION	Ion Television
38.2	480i	| Court TV	
38.3	480i	Laff	Laff
38.4	480i	Mystery	Ion Mystery
38.5	480i	IONPlus	Ion Plus
38.6	480i	BUSTED	Busted
38.7	480i	GameSho	Game Show Central
38.8	480i	HSN	HSN
38.9	480i	QVC	QVC

=== Analog-to-digital conversion ===
WPXR-TV ended regular programming on its analog signal, over UHF channel 38, on June 12, 2009, the official date on which full-power television stations in the United States transitioned from analog to digital broadcasts under federal mandate. The station's digital signal remained on its pre-transition UHF channel 36, using virtual channel 38.
