= Elliston-Lafayette, Virginia =

- CDP
- Location within Shenandoah Valley Location within Virginia Location within the United States
- Coordinates: 37°13′19″N 80°13′5″W
- Country: United States
- State: Virginia
- County: Montgomery

Area
  - Total: 1.9 sq mi (4.8 km^{2})
  - Land: 1.9 sq mi (4.8 km^{2})
  - Water: 0 sq mi (0.0 km^{2})

Population (2000)
  - Total: 1,241
  - Density: 672/sq mi (259.6/km^{2})
- Time zone: UTC−5 (Eastern (EST))
  - Summer (DST): UTC−4 (EDT)
- FIPS code: 51-25496

Elliston-Lafayette was a census-designated place (CDP) in Montgomery County, Virginia, United States. The population was 1,241 at the 2000 census; in 2010, Elliston and Lafayette were split into separate CDPs. It is part of the Blacksburg–Christiansburg Metropolitan Statistical Area, which encompasses all of Montgomery County, Virginia, including the towns of Blacksburg and Christiansburg, and the city of Radford. However, many residents of the eastern section of Montgomery County more often travel to Roanoke or Salem for work, shopping, and services since these cities are generally closer and do not require driving up Christiansburg Mountain on U.S. Route 460 (which is a concurrency with U.S. Route 11 here) or Interstate 81.

Elliston and Lafayette are also considered distinct communities by most local residents. Lafayette is located along the Roanoke River just across the Roanoke County line. The north fork and south fork of the river join near Interstate 81 north of Lafayette. While Lafayette is named for the Marquis de Lafayette, it is pronounced "Luh-fett" or "Luh-fay-ett". The center of Elliston, which is the larger community, is approximately three miles west of Lafayette on US 460.

Shawsville is approximately four miles west of Elliston. The majority of US 460 between the communities is a completely straight stretch of road, which is not common in this area of Virginia, known locally as the Elliston Straightaway. During the 1990s, there was some minor controversy between Elliston and Shawsville about how far down the Elliston Straightaway would be the appropriate place for a "Welcome to Shawsville" sign. Additionally, Shawsville Elementary School also resides in 24087, the Elliston ZIP Code.

== Geography ==
Elliston-Lafayette is located at 37°13′19″N 80°13′5″W (37.222075, −80.218018).

According to the United States Census Bureau, the CDP has a total area of 1.9 square miles (4.8 km^{2}), all of it land.

== Demographics ==
As of the census of 2000, there were 1,241 people, 489 households, and 348 families residing in the CDP. The population density was 672.2 people per square mile (259.0/km^{2}). There were 533 housing units at an average density of 288.7/sq mi (111.2/km^{2}). The racial makeup of the CDP was 91.86% White, 4.03% African American, 0.56% Native American, 0.16% Asian, 0.16% Pacific Islander, 1.05% from other races, and 2.18% from two or more races. Hispanic or Latino of any race were 1.53% of the population.

There were 489 households, out of which 33.9% had children under the age of 18 living with them, 49.7% were married couples living together, 15.1% had a female householder with no husband present, and 28.8% were non-families. 23.7% of all households were made up of individuals, and 9.4% had someone living alone who was 65 years of age or older. The average household size was 2.53 and the average family size was 2.97.

In the CDP, the population was spread out, with 27.2% under the age of 18, 9.3% from 18 to 24, 31.5% from 25 to 44, 21.2% from 45 to 64, and 10.8% who were 65 years of age or older. The median age was 35 years. For every 100 females, there were 92.4 males. For every 100 females age 18 and over, there were 89.5 males.

The median income for a household in the CDP was $34,643, and the median income for a family was $37,266. Males had a median income of $22,479 versus $23,333 for females. The per capita income for the CDP was $13,785. About 8.6% of families and 12.9% of the population were below the poverty line, including 21.4% of those under age 18 and 18.3% of those age 65 or over.
