= WFIR =

Radio station in Roanoke, Virginia

- Roanoke, Virginia; United States
- Broadcast area: Roanoke Valley
- Frequency: 960 kHz
- Branding: 960 AM 94.5 FM 107.3 FM WFIR

Programming
- Format: News/talk
- Affiliations: ABC News Radio; Fox News Radio; Premiere Networks; Westwood One

Ownership
- Owner: Mel Wheeler, Inc.
- Sister stations: WPLY; WSLC-FM; WSLQ; WVBB; WVBE-FM; WXLK; WZZU

History
- First air date: June 20, 1924
- Former call signs: WDBJ (1924–1969)
- Former frequencies: 1310 kHz (1924–1927); 1300 kHz (1927–1928); 930 kHz (1928–1941)
- Call sign meaning: First in Roanoke

Technical information
- Licensing authority: FCC
- Facility ID: 31138
- Class: B
- Power: 5,000 watts (directional at night)
- Transmitter coordinates: 37°15′19″N 79°57′34″W
- Translators: 94.5 W233CK (Troutville); 107.3 W297BC (Roanoke)

Links
- Public license information: Public file; LMS
- Webcast: Listen live
- Website: www.wfirnews.com

WFIR (960 AM, "WFIR 960 AM 94.5 FM 107.3 FM") is a commercial radio station licensed to Roanoke, Virginia, and serving the Roanoke Valley. It airs a news/talk radio format and is owned and operated by Mel Wheeler, Inc. WFIR's studios and offices are on Electric Road in Roanoke. Programming is also heard on two FM translators: W297BC 107.3 MHz, off Catawba Valley Drive in Roanoke, and W233CK 94.5 MHz in Troutville.

WFIR's transmitter site is off Brandon Avenue SW. The station broadcasts with 5,000 watts non-directional by day. At night, to avoid interfering with other stations on AM 960, it uses a directional antenna.

== Programming ==
Local news and talk programs air in weekday morning and afternoon drive times, with syndicated shows heard the rest of day, including The Glenn Beck Program, The Clay Travis and Buck Sexton Show, The Sean Hannity Show, The Ramsey Show with Dave Ramsey, The Mark Levin Show, Ground Zero with Clyde Lewis and Coast to Coast AM with George Noory. Weekends feature shows on money, religion, technology, law, guns, home repair and gardening. Syndicated weekend programs include The Kim Komando Show, Rich DeMuro on Tech, Somewhere in Time with Art Bell, Tom Gresham's Gun Talk and Bill Handel on the Law.

== History ==
=== WDBJ ===
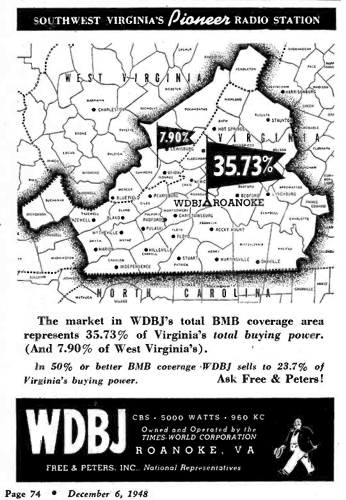
1948 advertisement as WDBJ.

WFIR is the second oldest radio station in Virginia, preceded by only WNIS in Norfolk, which was first licensed September 21, 1923. WFIR was first licensed, as WDBJ, on May 5, 1924, to the Richardson-Wayland Electrical Corporation at 106 Church Avenue in Roanoke, transmitting on 1310 kHz. On June 20, 1924, WDBJ officially went on the air. The studios were in the back of the company's store. The first program was a live banjo player. The original call sign was randomly assigned from roster of available call letters.

This company already had some limited broadcasting experience. Employee Frank E. Maddox had begun experimenting with radio broadcasts in Roanoke with amateur radio station 3BIY. (Note: The leading "3" in the 3BIY call sign specified that the station was located in the third radio district. The fact that the letter "B" was in the range of A to W meant that it was licensed as a standard amateur station.) A March 16, 1922, advertisement for Richardson-Wayland referred to the 3BIY broadcasts, stating that "Saturday nights we give a concert to which all are cordially invited". However, in early 1922 the Department of Commerce, regulators of radio at this time, issued regulations that prohibited amateur radio stations from making broadcasts. A couple years later, Richardson-Wayland asked Maddox to establish a commercial radio station. The company sold radio receivers, but because people in the Roanoke area had no local stations to listen to, they could only pick up distant signals after sunset.

In 1926, WDBJ moved to new studios at The American Theater on Jefferson Street and Campbell Avenue in Roanoke. In 1929, WDBJ began broadcasting at 930 kHz at 500 watts power, and also became the Roanoke affiliate of CBS Radio—a link that would last for more than 70 years. The station was sold to The Roanoke Times newspaper in 1931. Power increased to 1000 watts in 1934. In 1939, chief engineer J.W. Robertson increased the power to 5,000 watts. In 1941, under the North American Regional Broadcasting Agreement (NARBA), the station moved to AM 960. During the 1940s, 1950s and 1960s, WDBJ mixed bluegrass music and country music with adult standards and middle of the road popular tunes, while also carrying CBS radio dramas, comedies and sports. In October 1955, WDBJ-TV (channel 7) signed on the air as Roanoke's CBS television affiliate.

=== WFIR ===
Times-World Corporation, owner of the Times, merged with Landmark Communications in 1969. As a condition of the merger, Times-World sold ts broadcasting properties. Channel 7 kept the historic WDBJ call letters, with AM 960 becoming WFIR, standing for First in Roanoke, reflecting its status as the first broadcasting operation in the Roanoke Valley. In 1979, WFIR was purchased by Jim Gibbons, the former play-by-play announcer for the Washington Redskins football team. Gibbons added more news and sports programming. That same year, WFIR began carrying the syndicated Larry King Show overnight, and later, family financial adviser Bruce Williams in the evening. Through the 1980s, WFIR aired a full service adult contemporary format, keeping WFIR among the top ten radio stations in the Roanoke-Lynchburg media market ratings, despite the shift to FM radio listening. In 1987, the station added Rush Limbaugh to its midday schedule, one of his first affiliates.

In 1989 WFIR became a full-time news/talk radio station. In 2000, it was bought by Mel Wheeler, Inc., which owns eight radio stations in the Roanoke-Lynchburg market. In 2001, WFIR switched from CBS Radio News to ABC News Radio to be able to air Paul Harvey News which was dropped from WROV several years earlier.

WFIR's daytime omni-directional tower was co-located on a 39-acre property in Salem with WPLY (610 AM)'s four-tower directional array. The property was sold in 2026 and the towers demolished. Daytime operation was relocated to one of WFIR's nighttime towers, off of Brandon Avenue SW in Roanoke, and power was reduced from 10 kW to 5 kW.

== Translators ==
In addition to the main station, WFIR is relayed by two FM translators to widen its broadcast area.

Call sign	Frequency	City of license	FID	ERP (W)	HAAT	Class	FCC info
W233CK	94.5 FM	Troutville, Virginia	144940	200	60 m (197 ft)	D	LMS
W297BC	107.3 FM	Roanoke, Virginia	5146	125	219 m (719 ft)	D	LMS
