= WPLY =

- Lynchburg, Virginia; United States
- Broadcast area: Lynchburg, Virginia; Amherst County, Virginia
- Frequency: 1390 kHz
- Branding: Sports Radio Virginia

Programming
- Format: Sports
- Affiliations: Fox Sports Radio; Carolina Panthers Radio Network

Ownership
- Owner: Mel Wheeler, Inc.
- Sister stations: WFIR; WSLC-FM; WSLQ; WVBB; WVBE-FM; WXLK; WZZU

History
- First air date: July 7, 1988
- Former call signs: WVZN (1987–1993); WKPA (1993–2019); WPLI (2019–2025)
- Call sign meaning: "Play"

Technical information
- Licensing authority: FCC
- Facility ID: 59709
- Class: D
- Power: 4,700 watts (day); 34 watts (night)
- Transmitter coordinates: 37°27′52″N 79°07′21″W
- Translator: 107.5 W298CN (Lynchburg)

Links
- Public license information: Public file; LMS
- Webcast: Listen live
- Website: www.sportsradiova.com

WPLY (1390 AM) is a commercial radio station licensed to Lynchburg, Virginia, United States. WPLY features a sports format and, prior to September 30, 2025, simulcast (as WPLI) with WPLY (610 AM) in Roanoke. Both stations are owned and operated by Mel Wheeler, Inc. Most programming is supplied by Fox Sports Radio.
