= New River Valley =

Valley in Virginia, United States

Coordinates: 37.135°N 80.58°W

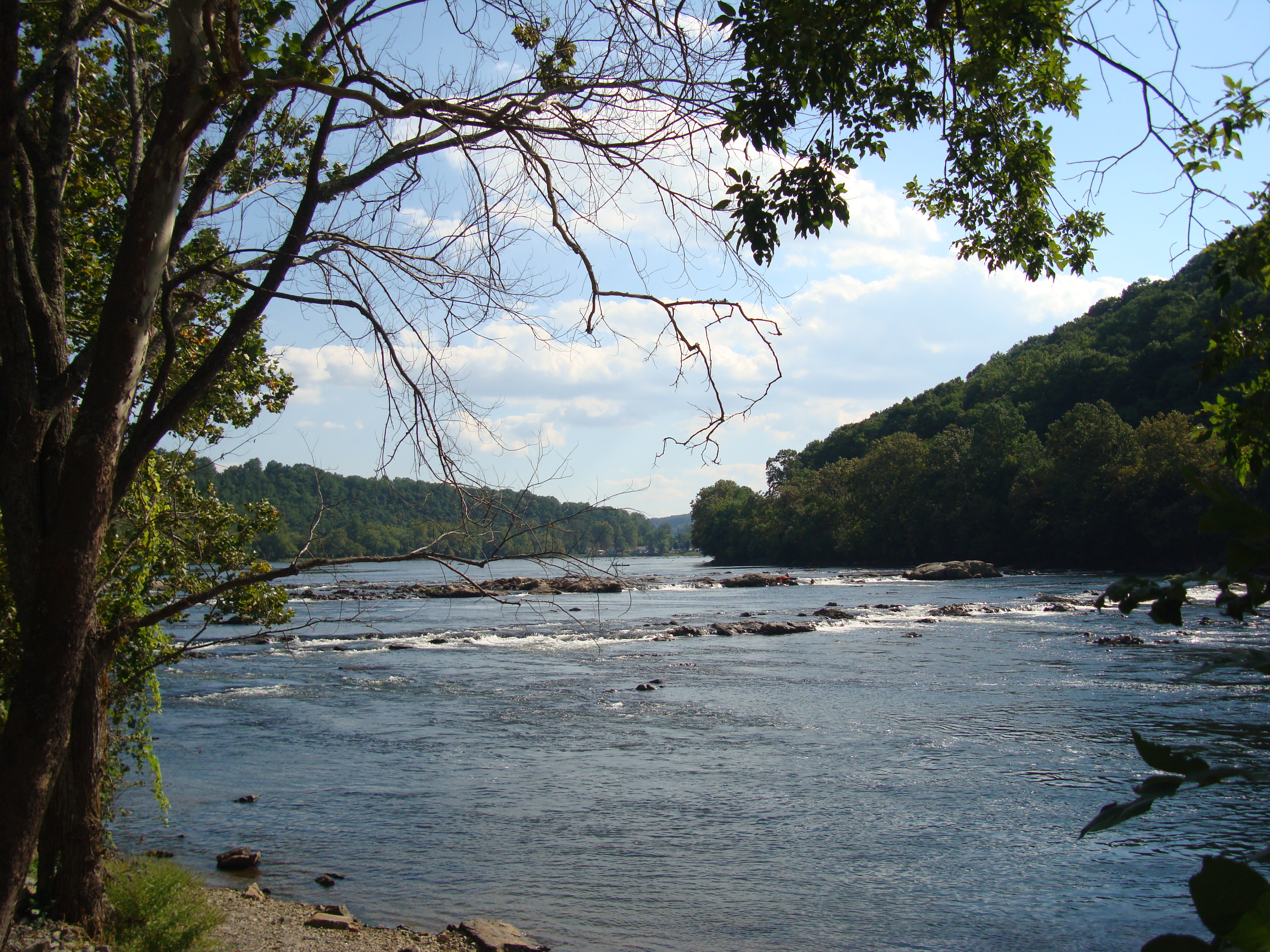
New River in Montgomery County, Virginia

The New River Valley is a region along the New River in Southwest Virginia in the United States, including such major features as Claytor Lake, part of the Jefferson National Forest, the city of Radford, the town of Blacksburg, and the New River, including the Pulaski terminus of the New River Trail State Park. Virginia's New River Valley brand is run by the economic development organization Onward New River Valley.

Local TV stations, regional organizations, tourism marketing promoters use the phrase to mean the counties of Giles, Pulaski, Montgomery and Floyd, the towns within them (e.g., Blacksburg), and the independent City of Radford, all located in the New River watershed. While Floyd County is not on the New River itself, it shares the Little River (New River tributary) with Montgomery and Pulaski.

Radford is nicknamed "The New River City," as it and the nearby Radford Arsenal are wrapped by bold loops in the river where it turns from flowing northeast to flowing northwest into West Virginia.

The "New River Valley" name is also used by other institutions in the region, including the New River Valley Community College and New River Valley Regional Jail, both in the Pulaski County town of Dublin, although they serve a wider region than the tourism-centered "NRV" promotions. With the exception of Floyd, the communities in the NRV promotion area comprise the statistical Blacksburg–Christiansburg metropolitan area.

Further south in Virginia, outside the "Visit NRV" marketing campaign and the Virginia's New River Valley brand, the New River also flows through Wythe, Carroll, and Grayson Counties, and its physical watershed includes parts of Tazewell and Bland Counties, and small portions of Smyth and Craig Counties. Outside of Virginia, the New River continues upstream into North Carolina and downstream into West Virginia.

Geologically part of the Great Appalachian Valley, the New River Valley became a contested frontier area in colonial times, and continued during the westward expansion of the United States. The first European to explore the valley was Abraham Wood of Fort Henry in 1671 and settlements began to develop in the 18th century. A branch of the Great Wagon Road led through the valley. The area was the location of several small American Civil War battles.

While the U S. census does not count the "New River Valley" as a region, the government-recognized Blacksburg–Christiansburg metropolitan area includes the three larger counties and the city of Radford; adding Floyd County, population 15,000, puts the "NRV" region's population over 190,000. The New River Valley has several institutions of higher learning, including Virginia Tech, Radford University, Edward Via College of Osteopathic Medicine and New River Community College.
