= Southwest Virginia =

Mountainous region of Virginia in the westernmost part of the commonwealth

Southwest Virginia at its greatest geographical definition

Southwest Virginia, often abbreviated as SWVA, is a mountainous region of Virginia in the westernmost part of the commonwealth. Located within the broader region of western Virginia, Southwest Virginia has been defined alternatively as all Virginia counties on the Appalachian Plateau, all Virginia counties west of the Eastern Continental Divide, or at its greatest expanse, as far east as Blacksburg and Roanoke. Another geographic categorization of the region places it as those counties within the Tennessee River watershed. Regardless of how borders are drawn, Southwest Virginia differs from the rest of the commonwealth in that its culture is more closely associated with Appalachia than the other regions of Virginia. Historically, the region has been and remains a rural area, but in the 20th century, coal mining became an important part of its economy. With the decline in the number of coal jobs and the decline of tobacco as a cash crop, Southwest Virginia is increasingly turning to tourism as a source of economic development. Collectively, Southwest Virginia's craft, music, agritourism and outdoor recreation are referred to as the region's "creative economy."

Counties that have been included in the definition of Southwest Virginia include: Alleghany, Bedford, Bland, Botetourt, Buchanan, Carroll, Craig, Dickenson, Floyd, Franklin, Giles, Grayson, Henry, Lee, Montgomery, Patrick, Pulaski, Roanoke, Russell, Scott, Smyth, Tazewell, Washington, Wise, and Wythe.

Unlike other states in the U.S., Virginia draws a sharp distinction between cities and other incorporated communities, all of which are designated as towns. Under state law, all municipalities incorporated as cities are independent of any county. By contrast, places incorporated as towns are included within counties. Independent cities in Southwest Virginia include Bristol, Buena Vista, Covington, Galax, Martinsville, Norton, Radford, Roanoke, and Salem.

== Culture ==
The culture of Southwest Virginia is more consistent with the wider Appalachian region than with the rest of the state of Virginia. This is due in large part to the geographical diversity of the state, with the Appalachian and Blue Ridge mountains dominating the region.

== History ==
Map of the Appalachian-Blue Ridge forests.

Southwest Virginia was among the last parts of the state to be settled by Europeans, in a flow of migrations that consisted mainly of English, German, and Scots-Irish and Irish immigrants. A major route of migration to the region was the Great Wagon Road through the Great Appalachian Valley. At present-day Roanoke there was an important fork in the wagon road, with one branch passing through the Blue Ridge and into the Piedmont region, and the other branch, called the Wilderness Road, continuing southwest to Tennessee and Kentucky. Much of the area was protected by a series of forts constructed around the time of Lord Dunmore's War, some of which later became the seats of future counties.

The first major industry in Southwest Virginia — which laid the foundation for the regionally important town of Abingdon — was salt. In Saltville (a small town now located on the Smyth-Washington county line), salt was (and still is) produced by using water to extract salt from the ground.

Many of the present day counties were formed from larger counties which were broken up as the populations in the region continued to grow. Southwest Virginia is also the result of parts of Virginia which broke off or revolted, such as Kentucky and West Virginia. During the American Revolution, residents from southwest Virginia were among those who participated in the Battle of King's Mountain, which occurred in South Carolina.

In the Civil War, Southwest Virginia was deeply divided between sentiment for the Union and the Confederacy and was subject to guerilla warfare. The only major battles to occur in the area were the Smyth County First and Second Battles of Saltville and of Marion, while many skirmishes occurred throughout much of the region. In 1864, Union General George Stoneman led a devastating raid into Southwest Virginia, destroying the saltworks in Saltville and burning all that he thought useful to the Confederates. At the time, the saltworks were considered a very important strategic target.

In the late 1800s and early 1900s, extractive industries became important in the region, especially the cutting of timber and coal mining. The coalfield region has experienced a significant loss of population over the last generation, resulting in shrinking political representation and a variety of local issues, including the need to consolidate schools.

Manufacturing, which did well during part of the 20th century, has also declined in Southwest Virginia despite local officials' efforts to recruit new industry. Tobacco has declined since the buyout of the federal quota program as well. Since the early 2000s, natural gas extraction has grown into an important industry, particularly in the coalfield region. Throughout Southwest Virginia, tourism has also begun to take off as an important industry.

== Geography ==
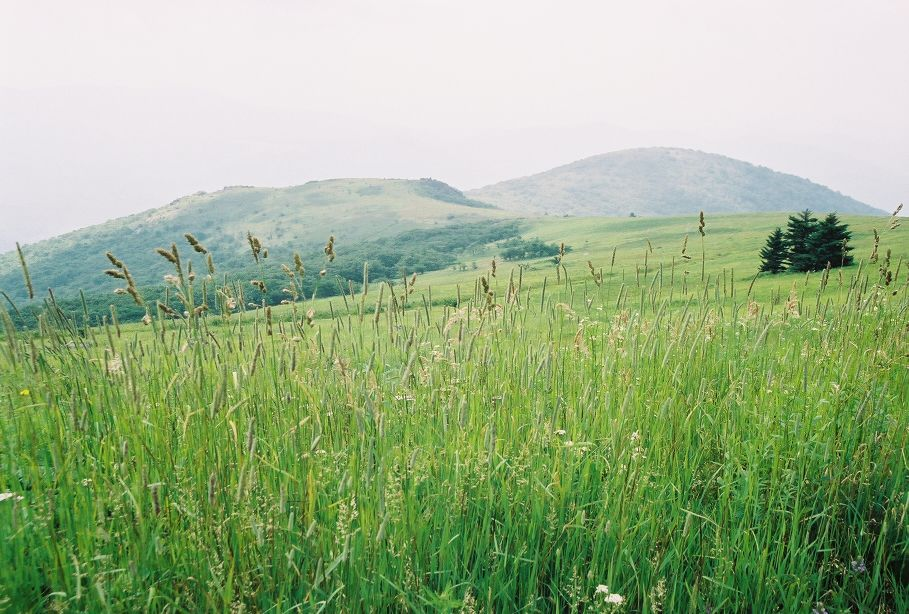
The Virginia highlands in Southwest Virginia

The Appalachian Mountains have the most direct impact upon the geography of Southwest Virginia and are often credited for isolating its residents from the rest of the commonwealth. Southwest Virginia falls into the ridge and valley and the Blue Ridge portions of the range. Within the mountains, coal fields have been one of the sources of the significant economic booms in the region. The major river of the region is the New River, credited as the oldest river in North America.

Flooding has been epidemic in the more mountainous areas, with major floods occurring about once every other decade with great loss of life and property. Such disasters have encouraged local precautions to prevent future problems, such as the Grundy Flood Control and Redevelopment Project, in Grundy, Virginia, a multimillion-dollar effort to protect the town from future flooding. This federally funded project moved an entire town up off of the river bank and onto a site blasted out of a mountainside.

=== Cities and towns ===
Independent cities in Southwest Virginia

- Bristol
- Buena Vista
- Covington
- Galax
- Lexington
- Martinsville
- Norton
- Radford
- Roanoke
- Salem

Towns in Southwest Virginia

- Appalachia
- Big Stone Gap
- Blacksburg
- Bland
- Bluefield
- Boones Mill
- Buchanan
- Cedar Bluff
- Chilhowie
- Christiansburg
- Claypool Hill
- Clifton Forge
- Clinchport
- Clintwood
- Coeburn
- Damascus
- Dublin
- Duffield
- Dungannon
- Fincastle
- Floyd
- Gate City
- Glade Spring
- Grundy
- Haysi
- Hillsville
- Honaker
- Hurley
- Independence
- Jonesville
- Lebanon
- Marion
- Narrows
- New Castle
- Nickelsville
- Oakwood
- Pearisburg
- Pembroke
- Pennington Gap
- Pound
- Pulaski
- Raven
- Rich Creek
- Richlands
- Rocky Mount
- Rose Hill
- Rural Retreat
- Saltville
- St. Charles
- St. Paul
- Stuart
- Tazewell
- Vansant
- Vinton
- Wise
- Wytheville

== Political representation ==
Virginia Congressional Districts as of 2023

Southwest Virginia has long been a Republican stronghold, dating back to the Jim Crow era. For twenty years (1903-1923), Virginia's 9th congressional district was the only congressional district in Virginia — and one of the few in the entire former Confederacy — to be represented by a Republican. The district alternated between Democratic and Republican representation over the rest of the century. Some of the election results were so close — and questionable — that the district became known as "The Fighting Ninth." The region has close ties with neighboring East Tennessee, Western North Carolina, Southern West Virginia, and Eastern Kentucky, which are all part of Appalachia and the Upland South.

Like the rest of the commonwealth, Southwest Virginia is represented by Senators Mark Warner and Tim Kaine in the United States Senate. In the House of Representatives, by the narrowest and almost to the largest definition of Southwest Virginia, representation falls largely under Representative Morgan Griffith of the 9th Congressional District. Southwest Virginia is part of Appalachia, and the most strongly Republican region of Virginia.

In 2010, Griffith defeated long-time representative Rick Boucher. Boucher had previously been a long term representative of the region in Congress, spending more than twenty-four years in office as a Democrat. His predecessor was William C. Wampler, a Republican, who had served a nearly equally long term of over eighteen years prior to his political defeat by Boucher. Republican Ben Cline of Rockbridge County represents the 6th Congressional District which also covers Lynchburg and much of the Shenandoah Valley. Republican Bob Goodlatte represented the 6th district for 26 years before retiring in 2019. Since most of Southwest Virginia has experienced little to no population growth in recent decades, the 9th district has begun to encroach into areas previously in the 5th and 6th districts.

== Education ==
Southwest Virginia is home to several institutions of higher education, the largest of which is Virginia Polytechnic Institute and State University (better known as "Virginia Tech"), in Blacksburg. Virginia Tech is the largest research university in the state as well as the largest employer in Montgomery County.

There are two medical schools in Blacksburg, and efforts are underway to develop a third in Abingdon. Professional schools—including schools of law and pharmacy—have been developed in recent years in Buchanan County, which is located in Southwest Virginia's coalfield region. There is also an effort within the region to help make higher education more accessible to students graduating from high school, particularly through partnerships between community colleges and other educational institutions.

=== List of colleges and universities ===
- Appalachian College of Pharmacy
- Bluefield University
- Emory and Henry College
- Ferrum College
- Hollins University
- Jefferson College of Health Sciences
- Mountain Empire Community College
- New River Community College
- Patrick & Henry Community College
- Radford University
- Roanoke College
- Southwest Virginia Community College
- Southern Virginia University
- University of Virginia's College at Wise
- Virginia College of Osteopathic Medicine
- Virginia Highlands Community College
- Virginia-Maryland Regional College of Veterinary Medicine
- Virginia Military Institute
- Virginia Polytechnic Institute and State University
- Virginia Tech Carilion School of Medicine and Research Institute
- Virginia Western Community College
- Washington and Lee University
- Wytheville Community College

== Appalachian Regional Commission ==
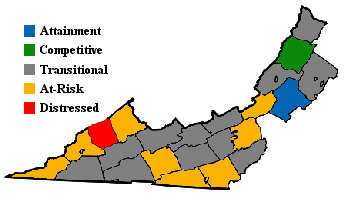
Map showing 2001-2003 ARC economic designations for counties and cities in "Appalachian" Virginia.

The Appalachian Regional Commission was formed in 1965 to aid economic development in the Appalachian region, which was lagging far behind the rest of the nation on most economic indicators. The Appalachian region currently defined by the Commission includes 420 counties in 13 states, including the westernmost counties and cities in Virginia. The Commission gives each county one of five possible economic designations— distressed, at-risk, transitional, competitive, or attainment— with "distressed" counties being the most economically endangered and "attainment" counties being the most economically prosperous. These designations are based primarily on three indicators— three-year average unemployment rate, market income per capita, and poverty rate. For data collection purposes, independent cities within the designated region are grouped with an adjacent county.

In 2003, Appalachian Virginia— which included most of Southwestern Virginia— had a three-year average unemployment rate of 5.7%, compared with 3.8% statewide and 5.5% nationwide. In 2002, Appalachian Virginia had a per capita market income of $16,901, compared with $29,279 statewide and $26,420 nationwide. In 2000, Appalachian Virginia had a poverty rate of 15.7%, compared to 9.6% statewide and 12.4% nationwide. Only one Virginia county— Dickenson— was designated "Distressed," while eight— Buchanan, Carroll (includes Galax), Craig, Grayson, Lee, Montgomery (includes Radford), Smyth, and Wise (includes Norton)— were designated "at-risk." Botetourt County was the only county given the "attainment" designation, and Bath was the only county designated "competitive." Most Appalachian Virginia counties were designated "transitional," meaning they lagged behind the national average on one of the three key indicators. Montgomery County had Appalachian Virginia's highest poverty rating, with 24.5% of its residents living below the poverty line. Botetourt had Appalachian Virginia's highest per capita income ($27,835) and lowest unemployment rate (2.7%).

== See also ==
- Appalachia
- East Tennessee
- Eastern Kentucky Coalfield
- Southern West Virginia
- Tennessee Valley
- List of Appalachian Regional Commission counties § Virginia
- Western North Carolina
