= WTLU =

WTLU may refer to:

- WZBJ-CD, a television station (channel 19, virtual 24) licensed to serve Lynchburg, Virginia, United States, which held the call sign WTLU-LD or WTLU-CD from 2007 to 2015
- WZBJ, a television station (channel 24) licensed to serve Danville, Virginia, which held the call sign WTLU from 2014 to 2015
