= Robin Reed (meteorologist) =

American journalist

Robin Reed is a journalist and was a lead news anchor and chief meteorologist at WDBJ-DT in Roanoke, Virginia for over 40 years until his retirement in December 2022.

== Career ==
In 1979, Reed began his television career with WHSV in Harrisonburg, Virginia, working as sports director and weathercaster. He joined WDBJ in March 1982 and has been llChief llMeteorologist ever since. Reed presents the weather forecasts for NEWS7 on the 5, 6, and 11 o'clock newscasts. Reed has been awarded the "Seal of Approval" by the American Meteorological Society and is an AMS Certified Broadcast Meteorologist (CBM), having been the sixth meteorologist in the country to earn this distinction.

Reed's coverage of the Flood of 1985 has been featured in the DVD, The Flood of '85 / Flood of Memories

Reed is a member of the advisory council of the School of Media Arts and Design at James Madison University.

In 2008, he co-hosted the 51st Emmy Awards for the National Capital Chesapeake Bay Chapter.

In 2012, Reed celebrated 30 years at WDBJ.

In 2017, Reed stepped down as WDBJ's chief meteorologist to take over anchor duties for WDBJ's 6 p.m. newscasts.

== Biography ==
Reed graduated from James Madison High School in Vienna, Virginia in 1974, and James Madison University in 1978. After high school, he initially pursued a career in baseball, having a private workout with the Texas Rangers in 1974, but opted to go to college instead. He holds two bachelor's degrees, one in Communications from JMU and a combined degree in Meteorology from Penn State, Ball State, Mississippi State, Portland State, Lyndon State and the USDA Graduate School.

Reed is considered to be one of the "most sought-after speakers" in Southwest Virginia and an advocate of math and science education. He has been referred to as, "the Willard Scott of the Roanoke area."

In 2011, Reed earned top-honors in "Easiest to Look at (male)" and "TV Weather Person you Trust" by The Roanoker magazine.

In 1997, Reed was one of 110 weathercasters chosen to attend a seminar on global warming data at The White House with NOAA scientists, President Bill Clinton and Vice President Al Gore.

In 1994, Reed was a contestant on the quiz portion of the nationally broadcast NPR show Whad'Ya Know? with host Michael Feldman

Reed is a resident of Fincastle, Virginia, and is an avid home cook.
