= Salem Highballers =

The Salem Highballers was the recording name given to The McCray Family by Okeh Records, their recording label in the 1920s and 1930s.They traveled somewhat but did not stray far from their hometown of Salem, Virginia.

Aside from local performances and their "Salem Highballers" sides, The McCray family's biggest claims to fame were their radio programs, performed live on Roanoke's WDBJ between 1925 and 1930.

For Okeh, they recorded "Salem #1," "Snow Bird on the Ash Bank," "Dinah, Old Lady," and "Going on to Town" in 1929.

The lineup consisted of Henry McCray on fiddle, and his sons Fred McCray on guitar, Carl McCray on guitar, and Robert McCray on banjo. Carl, the last surviving member, died in 1984.
