= CBS 8 =

CBS 8 may refer to one of the following television stations in the United States:

- KCCI in Des Moines, Iowa
- KFMB-TV in San Diego, California, which operates the cbs8.com website
- KLAS-TV in Las Vegas, Nevada
- KLST in San Angelo, Texas
- KNOE-TV in Monroe, Louisiana
- KPAX-TV in Missoula, Montana
- KUAM-DT2, a digital channel of KUAM-TV in Hagåtña, Guam
- WAKA in Montgomery, Alabama
- WAGM-TV in Presque Isle, Maine
- WKBT-DT in La Crosse, Wisconsin
- WROC-TV in Rochester, New York
- WVLT-TV in Knoxville, Tennessee

== Formerly affiliated ==
- KFDO-TV (later KVIJ-TV) in Sayre, Oklahoma (1966–1976)
  - Was a satellite of KFDA-TV in Amarillo, Texas
- WCHS-TV in Charleston, West Virginia (1954–1958 and 1962–1986)
- WHEN-TV (later WTVH) in Syracuse, New York (1948–1961; now on channel 5)
- WHOI in Peoria, Illinois (1953–1957; now on channel 19)
- WISH-TV in Indianapolis, Indiana (1956–2014)
- WJW in Cleveland, Ohio (1955–1994)
- KOLO-TV in Reno, Nevada (1953-1972)

== See also ==
CBS8, the Transport Canada location code for Port Alberni (Alberni Valley Regional) Airport
