= Robin Reed =

Robin Reed may refer to:

- Robin Reed (wrestler) (1899–1978), American wrestler and wrestling coach
- Robin Reed (meteorologist), American television journalist and meteorologist
- Robin Reed (biologist) (1956–2022), American professor of cell biology
- Robin Reed, drummer with The Trashmen

== See also ==
- Robin Reid (disambiguation)
