= James Packard =

James Packard may refer to:

- James Ward Packard (1863–1928), American automobile manufacturer
- Jim Packard (1931–1960), American automobile racer
- Jim Packard (radio host) (1942–2012), American radio producer and host
