= Channel 19 =

Channel 19 may refer to:

- CB radio channel 19 (27.185 MHz), unofficially a commonly monitored calling frequency for highway transport operators.
- Canal 19 (Salvadoran TV channel), a Salvadoran TV channel

== Canada ==
The following television stations broadcast on digital or analog channel 19 (UHF frequencies covering 500-506 MHz) in Canada:

- CBFT-DT in Montreal, Quebec
- CICA-DT in Toronto, Ontario
- CKRT-DT-6 in Trois-Pistoles, Quebec

The following television stations operate on virtual channel 19 in Canada:

- CICA-DT in Toronto, Ontario

== Mexico ==
The following television stations broadcast on digital channel 19 in Mexico:

- XERV-TDT in Reynosa, Tamaulipas
- XHFAS-TDT in Fronteras, Sonora
- XHIMS-TDT in Ímuris, Sonora
- XHZAT-TDT in Zacatecas, Zacatecas

One station operates on virtual channel 19 in Mexico:

- XHUAA-TDT in Tijuana, Baja California

== See also ==
- Chanel No. 19, a perfume
- Channel 19 branded TV stations in the United States
- Channel 19 digital TV stations in the United States
- Channel 19 low-power TV stations in the United States
- Channel 19 virtual TV stations in the United States
