= Robin Reid =

Robin Reid may refer to:

- Robin Reid (boxer)
- Robin Reid (cyclist)
- Robin Reid (criminal)
- Robin Reid (environmental scientist)
- Robin Anne Reid, scholar of literature

== See also ==
- Robin Reed (disambiguation)
