= KVII-TV =

Television station in Amarillo, Texas

KVII-TV and KVIH-TV

KVII-TV: Amarillo, Texas; KVIH-TV: Clovis, New Mexico; United States
- Channels for KVII-TV: Digital: 20 (UHF); Virtual: 7
- Channels for KVIH-TV: Digital: 12 (VHF); Virtual: 12
- Branding: ABC 7; Amarillo CW 11 (7.2/12.2)

Programming
- Affiliations: 7.1/12.1: ABC; 7.2/12.2: CW+; for others, see § Subchannels

Ownership
- Owner: Sinclair Broadcast Group; (KVII Licensee, LLC)

History
- First air date: KVII-TV: December 21, 1957; KVIH-TV: December 2, 1956
- Former call signs: KVII-TV: KVII (1957–1967); KVIH-TV: KICA-TV (1956–1959, 1962–1964); KVER-TV (1959–1962); KFDW-TV (1964–1979); KMCC-TV (1979–1986)
- Former channel number: KVII-TV: Analog: 7 (VHF, 1957–2009); Digital: 23 (UHF, 2000–2009), 7 (VHF, 2009–2022); KVIH-TV: Analog: 12 (VHF, 1956–2009); Digital: 20 (UHF, 2004–2009)
- Former affiliations: KVII-TV: PBS (Sesame Street only, 1970–1988); KVIH-TV: CBS (primary, 1956–1976); ABC (secondary, 1956–1976); CBS (as satellite of KFDA-TV, 1976–1979); ABC (as semi-satellite of KMCC, 1979–1986)
- Call sign meaning: KVII-TV: "VII" is 7 in Roman numerals; KVIH-TV: Variation of KVII with an H

Technical information
- Licensing authority: FCC
- Facility ID: KVII-TV: 40446; KVIH-TV: 40450
- ERP: KVII-TV: 1,000 kW; KVIH-TV: 160 kW (CP)
- HAAT: KVII-TV: 513 m (1,683 ft); KVIH-TV: 204 m (669 ft)
- Transmitter coordinates: KVII-TV: 35°22′30″N 101°52′58″W; KVIH-TV: 34°11′34″N 103°16′46″W

Links
- Public license information: KVII-TV: Public file; LMS; KVIH-TV: Public file; LMS
- Website: abc7amarillo.com

KVII-TV (channel 7) in Amarillo, Texas, and KVIH-TV (channel 12) in Clovis, New Mexico, are television stations affiliated with ABC and The CW Plus. Owned by Sinclair Broadcast Group, the stations maintain studios at One Broadcast Center between South Pierce and South Buchanan streets in downtown Amarillo. KVII-TV's transmitter is located west of US 87/287, in unincorporated Potter County, Texas, while KVIH-TV's tower is sited along State Road 88 east of Portales, New Mexico.

KVIH-TV operates as a full-time satellite of KVII-TV, covering areas of northeastern and east-central New Mexico; its existence is only acknowledged in station identifications. Aside from its transmitter, KVIH-TV does not maintain any physical presence in Clovis.

== History ==
On September 20, 1956, Southwest States Inc.—a consortium managed by George Oliver, Robert Houck, Hoyt Houck, John McCarthy, Sam Fenberg and real estate firm Estate Development, and which owned radio station KAMQ (1010 AM)—filed an application with the Federal Communications Commission (FCC) to obtain a license and construction permit to operate a commercial television station on VHF channel 7 in Amarillo, Texas. On February 5, 1957, Kenyon Brown—owner of local radio station KLYN (940 AM) as well as KWFT in Wichita Falls—filed a separate license application for channel 7. Brown withdrew his application for VHF channel 7 on December 11 of that year, ceding the application to Southwest States under an agreement in which that group would pay Brown $10,000 for out-of-pocket expenses if application was granted by August 7, 1957, or $7,500 if application was granted by September 20. The FCC awarded the license and permit for channel 7 to Southern States on August 1, 1957; the group subsequently requested and received approval to assign KVII-TV (referencing the roman numeral 7) as the television station's call letters.

Channel 7 first signed on the air on December 21, 1957, as the third television station to sign on in the Amarillo market, behind NBC affiliate KGNC-TV (channel 4, now KAMR-TV) and CBS affiliate KFDA-TV (channel 10), both of which signed on over four years earlier. KVII-TV has operated as an ABC affiliate since its debut, having assumed the local programming rights from KFDA-TV, which aired select network shows on a secondary basis since it signed on. The sign-of KVII made Amarillo one of the smallest markets in the U.S. to maintain full service from all three commercial broadcast television networks, although the market had no public television service until Amarillo College signed on KACV-TV (channel 2) in August 1988.

Only six months after it signed on, on June 28, 1958, Southwest States Inc. announced it would sell KVII-TV to Television Properties Inc. (owned by Jack C. Vaughn, Grady H. Vaughn Jr. and Cecil L. Trigg, respectively the co-owners and general manager of existing Television Properties outlet KOSA-TV in Odessa) for around $425,000, including obligations to own 77.7% of the station and an option to buy the remaining 22.5%. The sale received FCC approval almost one month later on July 16. In July 1961, the station relocated its studio facilities into the Walton Building (now the Maxor Building) on South Polk Street and Southwest Fourth Avenue in downtown Amarillo.

On August 1, 1963, Southwest States Inc. announced it would sell KVII to The Walton Group (founded by Kermit-based mineral rights entrepreneur John B. Walton Jr., and which also owned KVKM-AM-TV in Odessa, Texas, and held a minority stake in KFNE-FM in Big Spring) for $1.25 million. The sale received FCC approval nearly 3 1/2 months later on November 12. In October 1967, The Walton Group announced it would sell KVII-TV to Amarillo-based Marsh Media Ltd. (founded by Estelle Marsh, mother of Stanley Marsh 3, Tom F. Marsh, Michael C. Marsh and Estelle Marsh Wattlington, each of whom owned spare 5% interests not held by Estelle and managed local charity organization The Marsh Foundation) for $1.5 million. As part of the sale agreement, John Walton Jr.—who retained ownership of KVII-AM-FM—signed a ten-year non-compete contract to remain with KVII-TV as a station consultant for a salary of $50,000 per year. The sale received FCC approval on January 31, 1968.

Since 1968, when Marsh Media adopted the design shortly after purchasing the station, KVII-TV has used a proprietary version of the Circle 7 logo initially designed by G. Dean Smith for KGO-TV, which later expanded to many ABC-affiliated stations that broadcast on channel 7. It is the longest-continuously used logo among the Amarillo market's television stations (commercial or non-commercial). The station also utilized variants of the "Circle 7" for KVIJ-TV starting in 1979 and for KVIH-TV starting in 1986 for use in required hourly station identifications for KVII and its satellites, with those variants utilizing thin block lettering for those station's respective channel 8 and channel 12 allocations. (The KVIH variant was discontinued in 2001.) The logo is also adorned atop the station's studio facilities at One Broadcast Center, a pyramid-shaped building on Southeast 11th Avenue and South Pierce Street in downtown Amarillo, into which KVII relocated its operations in 1968. The studio building was designed by famous architect Paul Rudolph.

KVII-TV found it difficult to adequately compete against KGNC-TV and KFDA-TV largely because of the difficulties experienced by television stations operating in rugged terrain. The station was all but unviewable in Clovis, Portales and surrounding areas of northeastern New Mexico as well as portions of the far eastern Texas Panhandle. Many viewers in those areas received ABC programming either via KOAT-TV in Albuquerque or KOCO-TV in Oklahoma City. To solve this problem, KVII launched a network of UHF translators to serve areas not covered by its main signal. In October 1975, Marsh Media acquired KFDO-TV (channel 8) in Sayre, Oklahoma, from Bass Broadcasting Co. (then-owner of KFDA-TV) for $300,000; Marsh intended to convert KFDO—which Bass unloaded as part of the divestiture of its broadcast holdings to focus on its oil and gas exploration endeavors, and had been serving as a KFDA satellite since 1966—into a satellite station of KVII to reach viewers in the eastern Texas Panhandle as well as those in west-central Oklahoma who could not adequately receive ABC programming from KOCO. In January 1976, Marsh changed the Sayre station's call letters to KVIJ-TV to match its new parent station. KVII was one of the first commercial stations to air the PBS program Sesame Street. It started in 1970 and continued to air it until KACV signed on.

Following the death of Bill McAlister in October 1985, Marsh acquired a former satellite of KFDA, KMCC (channel 12) in Clovis, New Mexico, from his company, McAlister Television Enterprises Inc., for $1.5 million. KMCC—which had been operating as a satellite of fellow ABC affiliate KAMC-TV in Lubbock since 1979—converted into a KVII satellite in September 1986, under the call letters KVIH-TV, to relay its programming into portions of eastern New Mexico who could not adequately receive ABC programming from KOAT. On December 2, 1992, Marsh Media shut down KVIJ, citing the fact that very few television viewers in its west-central Oklahoma service area actually tuned into KVIJ directly, due to the ability of receiving ABC network programming via cable through either KOCO-TV out of Oklahoma City or KSWO-TV out of the Wichita Falls–Lawton DMAs. (KVIJ's former studio and transmitter site at the intersection of state highways 6 and 152, northwest of Sayre, currently sits vacant.)

On August 26, 2002, Marsh Media announced it would sell KVII-TV and KVIH-TV to Atlanta-based New Vision Group for $16.85 million. On April 7, 2005, New Vision Group announced it would sell KVII/KVIH to Schaumburg, Illinois-based Barrington Broadcasting (owned by New York City-based private equity firm Pilot Group LP and then headed by former National Association of Broadcasters joint board chairman and Benedek Broadcasting CEO Jim Yager) for $22.5 million.

On February 28, 2013, Barrington announced that it would sell KVII-TV, KVIH-TV and the company's sixteen other television stations (six of which were transferred to or remained under the ownership of third-party licensees to address ownership conflicts and had their operations handled by Sinclair through shared services agreements) to the Hunt Valley, Maryland-based Sinclair Broadcast Group for $370 million. The acquisition of the Barrington stations received FCC approval on November 18, 2013, and was formally consummated six days later on November 25. Sinclair transferred ownership of KVII/KVIH and the other former Barrington stations to Chesapeake Television, a subsidiary (which set up its headquarters at Barrington's former Schaumburg offices) focusing on smaller markets that maintain separate management from that which runs Sinclair's large and mid-market outlets. As result of the Barrington purchase, KVII gained new sister stations in nearby markets: Fox affiliate KOKH-TV and CW affiliate KOCB in Oklahoma City, and Fox affiliate KSAS-TV and its MyNetworkTV-affiliated LMA partner KMTW in Wichita.

== Programming ==
KVII-TV currently broadcasts the full ABC network schedule, with the only programming preemptions being the ABC News Brief seen during ABC Daytime programming, and situations in which preemption of the network's daytime and prime time programs is necessary to allow the main channel to provide extended coverage of breaking news or severe weather events (in some instances, these programs may either be rebroadcast on KVII on tape delay in place of the station's regular overnight programming, however, cable and satellite subscribers have the option of watching the affected shows on ABC's desktop and mobile streaming platforms or its cable/satellite video-on-demand service the day after their initial airing). The station carries the network's Sunday morning political/news discussion program This Week live via its Eastern Time Zone feed (at 8 a.m.), due to its broadcast of the Sinclair-produced investigative news program Full Measure and locally based Quail Creek Church's weekly televised services.

Starting with the 2002–03 season and ending in its final season (2010–11), KVII broadcast The Oprah Winfrey Show to viewers in the Texas Panhandle; before that time, NBC affiliate KAMR had aired the show for several years from its 1986–87 start when the station replaced it with The Wayne Brady Show (and later The Ellen DeGeneres Show).

=== News operation ===
As of September 2016, KVII-TV presently broadcasts 25 hours, 5 minutes of locally produced newscasts each week (with 4 hours, 35 minutes on weekdays and 1 hour, 5 minutes each on Saturdays and Sundays). In addition, KVII produces five hours of locally produced newscasts each week for its CW-affiliated subchannel KVII-DT2 (running for a half-hour each on weekdays only). The station may also simulcast long-form severe weather coverage on KVII-DT2 in the event that a tornado warning is issued for any county within the Texas and Oklahoma Panhandles as well as Eastern New Mexico.

The ProNews title had been used at KVII-TV continuously since Marsh Media purchased the station from John Walton in late 1967. For many years, the 10 p.m. edition of ProNews was a 45-minute broadcast, but has been truncated back to 35 minutes in recent years. Also, ProNews 7 broadcast a noon newscast on Sundays during the 1970s and 1980s, along with the noon broadcast Monday through Friday.

On February 6, 2012, KVII began producing a half-hour prime time newscast at 9 p.m. for KVII-DT2, which aired only on Monday through Friday nights, under the title ProNews 7 at 9:00 (now ABC 7 News: The Panhandle's News at 9:00). The KVII-produced program would gain additional prime-time news competitors beginning with the launch of a half-hour prime-time newscast in that timeslot on KCIT (channel 14), a program that NBC-affiliated sister station KAMR-TV began producing for the Fox affiliate in March 2001 after the station brought back a newscast for channel 14 after a 6-year absence.

On April 6, 2015, KVII unveiled a new studio, and discontinued the previous Pro News 7 brand in favor of simply ABC 7 News.

==== Notable former on-air staff ====
- Kathy Vara

== Technical information ==
=== Subchannels ===
The stations' signals are multiplexed:

Subchannels of KVII-TV and KVIH-TV
Channel		Res.	Short name	Programming
KVII-TV	KVIH-TV	Res.	Short name	Programming
7.1	12.1	720p	ABC	ABC
7.2	12.2	720p	CW	The CW Plus
7.3	12.3	480i	Charge!	Charge!
7.4	12.4	480i	ROAR	Roar
7.5	12.5	480i	Comet	Comet
7.6	12.6	480i	TheNest	The Nest

=== Analog-to-digital conversion ===
By mid-October 2006, the digital signal was fully operating, coinciding with the introduction of a viewer-interactive newscast, in which viewers can send e-mails with questions and concerns in regards to the stories and features in the newscasts. KVII-TV shut down its analog signal, over VHF channel 7, on June 12, 2009, the official date on which full-power television stations in the United States transitioned from analog to digital television under federal mandate. The station's digital signal relocated from its pre-transition UHF channel 23 to its pre-transition analog allocation of VHF channel 7.

=== Rebroadcasters ===
To reach viewers throughout the 34 counties comprising the Amarillo television market, KVII-TV extends its over-the-air coverage area through a full-power satellite station and a network of 12 low-power translator stations encompassing much of the Texas and Oklahoma Panhandles, and the northeastern New Mexico that distributes its programming beyond the 70.9-mile-wide (114.1 km) range of its broadcast signal. (All low-power translators transmit on virtual channel 7, including those located adjacent to KVIH-TV's coverage area.) Nielsen Media Research treats KVII and KVIH as one station in local ratings books, using the identifier name "KVII+".

KVII and KVIH serve viewers across a four-state region including the Texas and Oklahoma panhandles, eastern New Mexico and southwestern Kansas. A unique feature of KVII's coverage area is that it covers two time zones—Central and Mountain. This means that viewers in New Mexico watch ABC's prime time schedule from 6 to 9 p.m. (instead of 7 to 10 p.m.), with Jimmy Kimmel Live! airing at 9:35 p.m.

==== Former full-power satellite ====
Station	City of license	Channel	First air date	Last air date	Former affiliations	Transmitter coordinates
KVIJ-TV	Sayre, OK	8	August 7, 1961	December 2, 1992	Independent (1961–1965); CBS (1966–1976)	35°25′23.9″N 99°50′35.2″W

==== Translators ====
- Canadian, TX: K33CQ-D
- Childress, TX: K16LY-D and K23DE-D
- Clarendon, TX: K31OV-D
- Guymon, OK: K26JO-D
- Memphis, TX: K28OF-D
- New Mobeetie, TX: K22NS-D
- Quanah, TX: K20OA-D
- Tucumcari, NM: K21OF-D
- Tulia, TX: K36CC-D
- Turkey, TX: K24IX-D

== See also ==
- Channel 20 digital TV stations in the United States
- Channel 7 virtual TV stations in the United States
