= Channel 7 virtual TV stations in the United States =

The following television stations operate on virtual channel 7 in the United States:

- K04RX-D in Preston, Idaho
- K05CF-D in Weaverville, California
- K05DQ-D in Burney, etc., California
- K05EM-D in Paradise, California
- K05FW-D in Girdwood, Alaska
- K05GL-D in Coolin, Idaho
- K07GQ-D in Cedar City, Utah
- K07JO-D in Chelan Butte, Washington
- K07OL-D in Kipnuk, Alaska
- K07PF-D in Homer, Alaska
- K07PG-D in Seward, Alaska
- K07QD-D in Hooper Bay, Alaska
- K07QX-D in Golovin, Alaska
- K07RB-D in Tanana, Alaska
- K07RD-D in Savoonga, Alaska
- K07RJ-D in Holy Cross, Alaska
- K07RK-D in St. Marys, Alaska
- K07RU-D in Dot Lake, Alaska
- K07RY-D in Chignik, Alaska
- K07SS-D in Angoon, Alaska
- K07ST-D in Women's Bay, Alaska
- K07TH-D in Lime Village, Alaska
- K07TK-D in Marshall, Alaska
- K07UY-D in Cortez, Colorado
- K07ZU-D in Blanding, Monticello, Utah
- K07ZY-D in Beaver, etc., Utah
- K07AAL-D in Orogrande, New Mexico
- K07AAN-D in Santa Maria, California
- K08PQ-D in Big Arm/Elmo, Montana
- K08PR-D in Missoula, Montana
- K08PW-D in Laketown, etc., Utah
- K08QP-D in Silver City, New Mexico
- K09AI-D in Las Vegas, New Mexico
- K09YP-D in Mink Creek, Idaho
- K09ZK-D in Long Valley Junction, Utah
- K09ZV-D in Helper, Utah
- K10CG-D in Aztec, New Mexico
- K10LH-D in West Glacier, etc., Montana
- K10OA-D in Terrace Lakes, Idaho
- K10PW-D in Gallup, New Mexico
- K10RH-D in Salina & Redmond, Utah
- K10RI-D in Marysvale, Utah
- K10RJ-D in Woodland & Kamas, Utah
- K10RL-D in East Price, Utah
- K10RO-D in Roosevelt, etc., Utah
- K11BM-D in Methow, Washington
- K11EV-D in Grants, etc., New Mexico
- K11KE-D in Woods Bay, Montana
- K11VI-D in Elkton, Oregon
- K11XD-D in Rural Juab, etc., Utah
- K12CV-D in Riverside, Washington
- K12JJ-D in Benbow, etc., California
- K12LA-D in Kenai, etc., Alaska
- K12NH-D in Hobbs, New Mexico
- K12OC-D in Red River, New Mexico
- K13BA-D in Winthrop-Twisp, Washington
- K13IY-D in Leavenworth, Washington
- K13OW-D in Baker, Montana
- K13PJ-D in Vallecito, Colorado
- K13RK-D in Roswell, New Mexico
- K13WT-D in Plevna, Montana
- K14QC-D in Mexican Hat, Utah
- K14RJ-D in Mayfield, Utah
- K14RP-D in Leamington, Utah
- K14RU-D in Spring Glen, Utah
- K14SE-D in McDermitt, Nevada
- K15CX-D in Oroville, California
- K15GZ-D in Wendover, Utah
- K15IO-D in McCall & New Meadows, Idaho
- K15KK-D in Mt. Powell, New Mexico
- K15KX-D in Circleville, Utah
- K16CH-D in Raton, New Mexico
- K16HW-D in Evanston, etc., Wyoming
- K16IE-D in Coos Bay, Oregon
- K16II-D in Hilldale, Utah
- K16JE-D in Glenns Ferry, Idaho
- K16LU-D in Caballo, New Mexico
- K16LY-D in Childress, Texas
- K16MB-D in Hatch, Utah
- K17DA-D in Lake Havasu City, Arizona
- K17EV-D in Omak, Washington
- K17JW-D in Romeo, Colorado
- K17KF-D in Cambridge, Idaho
- K17KR-D in Winthrop, Washington
- K17MU-D in Rural Sevier County, Utah
- K17MZ-D in Torrey, Utah
- K17NA-D in Panguitch, Utah
- K17NB-D in Henrieville, Utah
- K17ND-D in Koosharem, Utah
- K17NH-D in Sterling, Colorado
- K17NL-D in Enterprise, Utah
- K17NP-D in Columbia, etc., Utah
- K17NY-D in Fruitland, Utah
- K18FR-D in Newport, Oregon
- K18IT-D in Green River, Utah
- K18KI-D in Baker City, Oregon
- K18MH-D in Rural Garfield, Utah
- K18MO-D in Worthington, Minnesota
- K18MX-D in Orangeville, etc., Utah
- K18NC-D in Malad, Idaho
- K18NH-D in Puyallup, Washington
- K18NI-D in Point Pulley, etc., Washington
- K18NX-D in Carlsbad, New Mexico
- K19CM-D in Farmington, New Mexico
- K19EI-D in Pacific C/Cloverdale, Oregon
- K19EU-D in Winnemucca, Nevada
- K19HA-D in Navajo Mtn. Sch., etc., Utah
- K19HB-D in Oljeto, Utah
- K19IG-D in Mexican Hat, etc., Utah
- K19JJ-D in Vale, Oregon
- K19KE-D in Jolly, Texas
- K19LZ-D in Las Cruces & Organ, New Mexico
- K19ML-D in Wray, Colorado
- K20FS-D in Peetz, Colorado
- K20GH-D in Milford, etc., Utah
- K20GK-D in Pleasant Valley, Colorado
- K20ID-D in Kingman, Arizona
- K20NU-D in Tabiona & Myton, Utah
- K21AM-D in Ninilchick, etc., Alaska
- K21EI-D in Beryl/Modena, etc., Utah
- K21FF-D in Holyoke, Colorado
- K21IL-D in Apple Valley, Utah
- K21IX-D in Montezuma Creek/Aneth, Utah
- K21KA-D in Ferndale, Montana
- K21KC-D in Bluff, etc., Utah
- K21LR-D in Alamogordo, New Mexico
- K21MS-D in La Grande, Oregon
- K21MU-D in Summit County, Utah
- K21OF-D in Tucumcari, New Mexico
- K22FW-D in Mount Pleasant, Utah
- K22IP-D in Virgin, Utah
- K22IX-D in Mayfield, Utah
- K22LW-D in Orderville, Utah
- K22ME-D in Deming, New Mexico
- K23DE-D in Childress, Texas
- K23GR-D in Preston, Idaho
- K23IS-D in Ridgecrest, etc., California
- K23JD-D in Colfax, New Mexico
- K23JY-D in Huntington, Utah
- K23KP-D in Fishlake Resort, Utah
- K23KY-D in Council, Idaho
- K23MU-D in Bridgeport, Washington
- K23NM-D in Sandpoint, Idaho
- K24DK-D in Bullhead City, Arizona
- K24IV-D in Farmington, New Mexico
- K24IX-D in Turkey, Texas
- K24JN-D in Lewiston, Idaho
- K24NH-D in Durango, Colorado
- K25PI-D in Kasilof, Alaska
- K25PT-D in Sargents, Colorado
- K26DE-D in Bozeman, Montana
- K26FP-D in Idalia, Colorado
- K26IC-D in Bremerton, Washington
- K26JO-D in Guymon, Oklahoma
- K26LJ-D in Coeur d'Alene, Idaho
- K26NJ-D in Powers, Oregon
- K26OZ-D in Everett, Washington
- K27JT-D in Fillmore, etc., Utah
- K27NH-D in Morgan, etc., Utah
- K28ER-D in Dulce & Lumberton, New Mexico
- K28JR-D in Wanship, Utah
- K28NX-D in Montoya & Newkirk, New Mexico
- K28OF-D in Memphis, Texas
- K28OT-D in Coalville, Utah
- K28OW-D in Parowan/Enoch, etc., Utah
- K29EG-D in Milton, etc., Oregon
- K29IA-D in Centralia, etc., Washington
- K29IT-D in Gateview, Colorado
- K29MH-D in Kanab, Utah
- K29ML-D in Kanarraville/New Harmony, Utah
- K29NB-D in Cascade, Idaho
- K29NF-D in Anton, Colorado
- K30DT-D in Flagstaff, Arizona
- K30JQ-D in Carbondale, Colorado
- K30KV-D in Crownpoint, New Mexico
- K30MJ-D in Libby, Montana
- K30OF-D in Baker Valley, Oregon
- K30OL-D in Washington, etc., Utah
- K30OX-D in Montpelier, Idaho
- K31DS-D in Coolin, Idaho
- K31EI-D in Cedar Canyon, Utah
- K31HC-D in Quanah, Texas
- K31KB-D in Deming, New Mexico
- K31KJ-D in Big Springs, Texas
- K31LC-D in Nephi, Utah
- K31MK-D in Lawton, Oklahoma
- K31NK-D in Peoa, Oakley, Utah
- K31NU-D in Hanksville, Utah
- K31OB-D in Randolph, Utah
- K31OC-D in Broken Bow, Nebraska
- K31OV-D in Clarendon, Texas
- K31PH-D in Crested Butte, Colorado
- K32HA-D in Bonners Ferry, Idaho
- K32HH-D in Kalispell, Montana
- K32IS-D in Henefer, etc., Utah
- K32MC-D in Baker Flats Area, Washington
- K32MI-D in Delta/Oak City, etc., Utah
- K32MW-D in Logan, Utah
- K32NC-D in Toquerville, Utah
- K32NI-D in Clear Creek, Utah
- K33FT-D in Manti/Ephraim, Utah
- K33FX-D in Heber/Midway, Utah
- K33IY-D in Le Chee, etc., Arizona
- K33JW-D in Rockville/Springdale, Utah
- K33LA-D in Duchesne, Utah
- K33MW-D in Mankato, Minnesota
- K33PN-D in Ferron, Utah
- K33OL-D in Fremont, Utah
- K33OO-D in Antimony, Utah
- K33OQ-D in Escalante, Utah
- K33PJ-D in Emery, Utah
- K33PK-D in Green River, Utah
- K34AI-D in La Pine, Oregon
- K34CR-D in Alamogordo, etc., New Mexico
- K34IY-D in Boulder, Utah
- K34JD-D in Manila, etc., Utah
- K34MG-D in Garden Valley, Idaho
- K34NN-D in Brewster & Pateros, Washington
- K34NW-D in Rural Garfield County, Utah
- K34OF-D in Caineville, Utah
- K34OJ-D in Park City, Utah
- K34ON-D in Samak, Utah
- K35GD-D in Golconda, Nevada
- K35GG-D in Huntsville, etc., Utah
- K35IJ-D in Hanna & TAbiona, Utah
- K35IQ-D in Vernal, etc., Utah
- K35IR-D in Garrison, etc., Utah
- K35JJ-D in Scofield, Utah
- K35JK-D in Fountain Green, Utah
- K35NK-D in Cannonville, Utah
- K36CC-D in Tulia, Texas
- K36DK-D in Joplin, Montana
- K36JX-D in Many Farms, Arizona
- K36KD-D in Tierra Amarilla, New Mexico
- K36LF-D in Taos, New Mexico
- K36NO-D in Alton, etc., Utah
- K36OY-D in Sterling, Colorado
- K36PI-D in Livingston, etc., Montana
- K36PS-D in Julesburg, Colorado
- K36PT-D in Haxtun, Colorado
- K39GH-D in Quanah, Texas
- K46KI-D in Woody Creek, Colorado
- K49IT-D in Hagerman, Idaho
- K49KV-D in Stemilt, etc., Washington
- KABC-TV in Los Angeles, California
- KAII-TV in Wailuku, Hawaii
- KAIL in Fresno, California
- KAKM in Anchorage, Alaska
- KATV in Little Rock, Arkansas
- KAZT-CD in Phoenix, Arizona
- KAZT-TV in Prescott, Arizona
- KBHO-LD in Richmond, Texas
- KBND-LP in Bend, Oregon
- KBNZ-LD in Bend, Oregon
- KBSH-DT in Hays, Kansas
- KBZK in Bozeman, Montana
- KDNU-LD in Las Vegas, Nevada
- KETV in Omaha, Nebraska
- KEVN-LD in Rapid City, South Dakota
- KGO-TV in San Francisco, California
- KHQA-TV in Hannibal, Missouri
- KHXL-LD in Huntsville, Texas
- KIRO-TV in Seattle, Washington
- KJJC-LD in Helena, Montana
- KJRR in Jamestown, North Dakota
- KKTM-LD in Altus, Oklahoma
- KLTV in Tyler, Texas
- KMGH-TV in Denver, Colorado
- KMNE-TV in Bassett, Nebraska
- KMNF-LD in St. James, Minnesota
- KOAC-TV in Corvallis, Oregon
- KOAM-TV in Pittsburg, Kansas
- KOAT-TV in Albuquerque, New Mexico
- KONC in Alexandria, Minnesota
- KOSA-TV in Odessa, Texas
- KOTA-TV in Rapid City, South Dakota
- KOTR-LD in Monterey, California
- KPLC in Lake Charles, Louisiana
- KPTN-LD in St. Louis, Missouri
- KQCD-TV in Dickinson, North Dakota
- KRCR-TV in Redding, California
- KRMF-LD in Reno, Nevada
- KSPS-TV in Spokane, Washington
- KSWO-TV in Lawton, Oklahoma
- KTBC in Austin, Texas
- KTFT-LD in Twin Falls, Idaho
- KTNL-TV in Sitka, Alaska
- KTTM in Huron, South Dakota
- KTTW in Sioux Falls, South Dakota
- KTVB in Boise, Idaho
- KUED in Salt Lake City, Utah
- KVIA-TV in El Paso, Texas
- KVII-TV in Amarillo, Texas
- KVYE in El Centro, California
- KWWL in Waterloo, Iowa
- KZCO-LD in Denver, Colorado
- KZFC-LD in Windsor, Colorado
- KZTC-LD in San Diego, California
- W02AT-D in Burnsville, North Carolina
- W04AG-D in Garden City, etc., Virginia
- W07BP-D in Ocala, Florida
- W07DD-D in Champaign, Illinois
- W08AT-D in Cherokee, North Carolina
- W08BF-D in Spruce Pine, North Carolina
- W09AF-D in Sylva, North Carolina
- W09AG-D in Franklin, North Carolina
- W10AD-D in Montreat, North Carolina
- W10AJ-D in Greenville, South Carolina
- W11AN-D in Bryson City, North Carolina
- W15EL-D in Mars Hill, North Carolina
- W18EP-D in Weaverville, North Carolina
- W21DS-D in Sayner/Vilas County, Wisconsin
- W23ES-D in Marshall, North Carolina
- W23EY-D in Canton, North Carolina
- W25ED-D in Albany, Georgia
- W25FW-D in Columbus, Georgia
- W32FI-D in Brevard, North Carolina
- W35DT-D in Beaver Dam, North Carolina
- WABC-TV in New York, New York
- WBBJ-TV in Jackson, Tennessee
- WCIQ in Mount Cheaha, Alabama
- WDAM-TV in Laurel, Mississippi
- WDBJ in Roanoke, Virginia
- WEFG-LD in Philadelphia, Pennsylvania
- WGBS-LD in Carrollton, Virginia
- WHDH in Boston, Massachusetts
- WHIO-TV in Dayton, Ohio
- WITN-TV in Washington, North Carolina
- WITV in Charleston, South Carolina
- WJCT in Jacksonville, Florida
- WJHG-TV in Panama City, Florida
- WJLA-TV in Washington, D.C.
- WKBW-TV in Buffalo, New York
- WKNX-TV in Knoxville, Tennessee
- WLS-TV in Chicago, Illinois
- WPBN-TV in Traverse City, Michigan
- WSAW-TV in Wausau, Wisconsin
- WSPA-TV in Spartanburg, South Carolina
- WSTE-DT in Ponce, Puerto Rico
- WSVN in Miami, Florida
- WTME-LD in Bruce, Mississippi
- WTNG-CD in Lumberton-Pembroke, North Carolina
- WTRF-TV in Wheeling, West Virginia
- WTVW in Evansville, Indiana
- WVII-TV in Bangor, Maine
- WVUA-CD in Tuscaloosa/Northport, Alabama
- WWNY-TV in Carthage, New York
- WXVO-LD in Pascagoula, Mississippi
- WXYZ-TV in Detroit, Michigan

The following stations, which are no longer licensed, formerly operated on virtual channel 7:

- K07QU-D in Shaktoolik, Alaska
- K07QV-D in Hoonah, Alaska
- K07RC-D in Fort Yukon, Alaska
- K07RZ-D in Crooked Creek, Alaska
- K10BB-D in Ardenvoir, Washington
- K11MU-D in Paradise Valley, Nevada
- K14OL-D in Granite Falls, Minnesota
- K29AA-D in Kalispell/Whitefish, Montana
- K30FL-D in Port Angeles, Washington
- K31BZ-D in Wellington, Texas
- K33CQ-D in Canadian, Texas
- K34OG-D in Little America, etc., Wyoming
- K39AN-D in New Mobeetie, Texas
- K41MX-D in Perryton, Texas
- K42CF-D in Gruver, Texas
- K42CR-D in Tucumcari, New Mexico
- K44CG-D in Capulin, etc., New Mexico
- K45AU-D in Follett, Texas
- K48JH-D in Capulin, etc., New Mexico
- K48MH-D in Roswell, New Mexico
- K50NL-D in Lowry, South Dakota
- KCCO-TV in Alexandria, Minnesota
- KFYF in Fairbanks, Alaska
- KJCW in Sheridan, Wyoming
- KQFW-LD in Dallas, Texas
- KSWX-LD in Duncan, Oklahoma
- W25EM-D in Columbus, Georgia
- WNGA-LD in Salisbury, Maryland
