= Whad'Ya Know? =

US radio program

Whad'Ya Know
- Genre: Quiz/comedy
- Running time: c. 110 min.
- Country of origin: United States
- Language: English
- Home station: Wisconsin Public Radio (1985–2016)
- Syndicates: Public Radio International (1985–2016)
- Hosted by: Michael Feldman
- Announcer: Jim Packard (1985–2012); Sara Nics (2012–2015); Stephanie Lee (2015–2016)
- Recording studio: Monona Terrace; Madison, Wisconsin
- Original release: 1985 – 2025
- Audio format: Stereophonic
- Website: www.whadyaknow.net

Whad'Ya Know? is an American comedy, interview, and quiz radio show. Hosted by Michael Feldman, it was created in 1985. During its radio run, it was produced by Wisconsin Public Radio and distributed through Public Radio International. Feldman was accompanied on-stage by Lyle Anderson, phone-answerer; and the Whad'ya Know Trio with John Thulin on piano, Jeff Hamann on bass, and, on road shows, Clyde Stubblefield on drums. Jeffry Eckels was the original full-time bass player from 1987 to 2003. Feldman was also accompanied by Jim Packard as announcer from the show's beginning until his death following the June 9, 2012, show from New York City. Sara Nics was the show's announcer from October 13, 2012 to March 28, 2015. Stephanie Lee became the show's announcer in August 2015. The show was broadcast live with an audience from Monona Terrace in Madison, Wisconsin. Periodically, the show was taken on the road and broadcast from various other locations across the United States. The show was broadcast weekly, each Saturday at 10:00 AM CT (UTC-6) for two hours, and repeated throughout the week by syndication. Since the beginning of 2009, the entire show has also been available over the Internet as a podcast. The show aired its final WPR/PRI radio broadcast on June 25, 2016, with prior episodes archived on the show's website. Starting in the fall of 2016, Whad'ya Know became available as a podcast. The last episode of the podcast was released on February 2, 2025.

== Game format ==
Just as Feldman's quickness and comedic rhythms are reminiscent of Groucho Marx, the game is reminiscent of Marx's You Bet Your Life quiz show in that it is designed more to give the host a chance to interact with the players than to be a serious test of their knowledge. Feldman often comments that the Whad'Ya Know quiz is not a trivia quiz, but rather one of "general knowledge." When the show is recorded from its home base at Monona Terrace in Madison, Wisconsin, the call-in number used is 1-800-942-5669. With this number, the announcer would also give the telephonic mnemonic 1-800-WHA-KNOW or 1-800-WHAK-NOW. While on the road, phone number changes are handled in the same fashion, often resulting in humorous, nonsensical words or phrases.

Twice during the show, usually towards the end of each hour, the Whad'ya Know quiz is played. The game is played with a two-member team: the first member being selected by Feldman from the audience, and the second from a radio audience caller. The caller must correctly answer a qualifying question before being added to the team.

The two contestants then play the main game. To win, they must answer three questions correctly before getting three wrong. Six categories for questions are presented:

- Current Events
- People
- Places
- Things You Should Have Learned In School (Had You Been Paying Attention)
- Science
- Odds and Ends

The players take turns choosing a category for each question, beginning with the call-in player. Feldman reads the questions (often multiple-choice), and the team collaborates to come up with an answer. If correct, the team earns one point. Teams are kept apprised of their point status by the announcer. When the team earns three points, bells signal that they have won the game. To ensure that the team will win, Feldman frequently offers hints or slyly lets them know when they are on the wrong track. As a result, it is rare for a team to lose.

The winning team is awarded a set of prizes. If a team earns three points without missing a single question, they have the option of going for the "Mother Lode" by answering two more questions correctly without missing one, or else a fictitious penalty is put upon them (usually made up on the spot by the announcer and related to a joke from earlier in the show). If successful (and they almost always are), the contestants win a larger prize package—once called "The Giant Kielbasa", but that term has fallen out of use.

== Segments ==
Along with the Whad'Ya Know Quiz, music from the Whad'Ya Know Trio (often new arrangements or original compositions), and interviews with both celebrities and audience members, other segments have become recurring staples to the show's format.

=== All the News that Isn't ===
The show traditionally opens with a parody reading of "All the News that Isn't," a list of fictional headlines taken from real current events. If the show is on the road, the headlines will typically involve local headlines from the city and state in which the show is being broadcast.

=== Disclaimers ===
Prior to the playing of the first Quiz, an audience member is given a list of the four disclaimers to read, which state who can or cannot play the quiz. The disclaimers, read on the air every week, remain constant, with the exception of disclaimer 2, which is a short joke referencing a current event:

1. "All questions used on Whad'ya Know? have been painstakingly researched, although the answers have not. Ambiguous, misleading, or poorly worded questions are par for the course. Listeners who are sticklers for the truth should get their own shows."
2. Here the audience member reads a short statement making light of a current event. (Sometimes this quip takes the third position rather than the second.)
3. "Persons employed by the International House of Radio or its member stations are lucky to be working at all, let alone tying up the office phones trying to play the quiz. Listeners who have won recently should sit on their hands and let someone else have a chance for a change."
4. "All opinions expressed on Whad'ya Know? are well-reasoned and insightful. Needless to say, they are not those of the International House of Radio, its member stations, or lackeys. Anyone who says otherwise is itching for a fight."

=== Thanks for the memos ===
Usually at the beginning of the show's second hour, Feldman reads some "actual memos sent in to us by actual listeners" that often contain some sort of humorous content or blooper. This section of the show is not limited to memoranda per se, but also includes typos in newspaper headlines and other publications.

=== Town of the week ===
Each week at the end of the show, a town (selected on the prior week's show by an audience member throwing a dart at a rearranged map of the United States) is honored as the Town of the Week. The announcer gives a biographical description of the town, usually including the history of the town, famous landmarks, local sports teams, and other must-see places (with Feldman frequently interjecting comments). Feldman then has a phone conversation with a randomly selected citizen of that town to further discuss what life is like there.

As this is usually the last portion of the show, following the second Quiz session, this part of the show is frequently postponed when time runs out. This has led to many towns waiting for their chance to be honored for many weeks on end.

=== Whad'Ya Idol ===
During March 2007, Whad'Ya Know featured a special program, "Whad'Ya Idol". Contestants sent in short song clips and listeners voted. The winner, Aaron Kaufman, performed his song, "All My Life", live on the show on April 14. The three other finalists were "The Girl with the Cotton Candy Hair" by Oliver Brown, "Drinking Her Pretty" by Pedro Peterson, and "The Faith Within" by J Scott Rakozy.

== Related products ==
Out of the Box Publishing has produced a spin-off party game, Whad'Ya Know, designed by its co-founder, John Kovalic. On former shows, this game has sometimes been added to the prizes awarded to the winners of the quiz.
