= Jim Packard (radio host) =

- Born: L. James Packard; August 15, 1942
- Died: June 18, 2012 (aged 69); New York City
- Occupations: Radio producer and host
- Known for: Announcing on Whad'Ya Know?

L. James Packard (August 15, 1942 – June 18, 2012) was an American radio producer and host, best known for being part of Wisconsin Public Radio. After working in commercial radio for 16 years at radio networks such as WGN, he joined Wisconsin Public Radio, where he was often heard between shows and producing for Conversations with Larry Meiller. Jim worked with Michael Feldman to produce Whad'Ya Know? and was often seen as the brains of the operation. He often wore a baseball cap with attached webcam, known by fans as "Jim Cam." On the show Jim read questions and honked a loud air horn.

In 2010, he retired from full-time work at Wisconsin Public Radio to focus on his cowboy poetry, although he continued as the announcer for Whad'Ya Know until his death. He married his wife in 1981.

He died on June 18, 2012, in New York City, from cardiopulmonary disease. His final performance was on the June 9, 2012, airing of Whad'Ya Know in New York. Packard was succeeded by Sara Nics in the fall of 2012.
