= KVIJ-TV =

Television station in Sayre, Oklahoma (1961–1992)

Former satellite of KVII-TV, Amarillo, Texas
- Sayre, Oklahoma; United States
- Channels: Analog: 8 (VHF)

Programming
- Affiliations: Independent (1961–1965); CBS via KFDA-TV (1966–1976); ABC via KVII-TV (1976–1992)

Ownership
- Owner: Marsh Media, Inc.

History
- First air date: August 7, 1961
- Last air date: December 2, 1992
- Former call signs: KSWB (1961–1965); KFDO-TV (1966–1976)
- Call sign meaning: Disambiguation from parent station KVII-TV

Technical information
- Facility ID: 40451
- ERP: 131.5 kW
- HAAT: 177 m (580 ft)
- Transmitter coordinates: 35°25′25″N 99°50′30″W

KVIJ-TV (channel 8) was a television station licensed to Sayre, Oklahoma, United States. It was owned by Marsh Media and served as a satellite station of its KVII-TV in Amarillo, Texas. The transmitter was located northwest of Sayre at the intersection of State Highway 152 and State Highway 6.

Originally a separate station in Elk City under the KSWB call letters, it was soon acquired and moved to Sayre, where it served in turn as a semi-satellite of two different Amarillo television stations—first KFDA-TV, then KVII-TV. Marsh shut the station down on December 2, 1992, citing the availability of Oklahoma-based ABC affiliates on cable in KVIJ-TV's service area.

== History ==
The station began broadcasting on August 7, 1961, as KSWB-TV, nearly four years after the award of its construction permit on November 20, 1957. It was owned by—and named for—the Southwest Broadcasting Company; its primary investor was Lonnie Preston, who owned radio station KWOE at nearby Clinton and had previously owned Elk City station KASA. KSWB-TV was an independent station, with local program features including a children's hour, women's show, and a 9:00 newscast.

KSWB was not a financially successful venture. In June 1965, Southwest Broadcasting sold channel 8 to the Bass Broadcasting Company, which owned KFDA-TV, the CBS affiliate in Amarillo. While the sale was pending, Bass filed to move the channel 8 license and facility from Elk City to Sayre; meanwhile, the station also suspended operations on August 11, 1965, due to financial difficulties. The call letters were changed to KFDO-TV, and Bass received program test authority from the Federal Communications Commission to begin broadcasting as a satellite from Sayre on May 13, 1966. Under Bass management, KFDA-TV stationed a reporter in the Sayre–Elk City area and also employed four technical personnel at the transmitter.

In 1975, Marsh Media purchased KFDO-TV for $300,000, from Bass—its direct competitor in Amarillo. In time for coverage of the 1976 Winter Olympics on ABC, the sale was closed and KFDO-TV became KVIJ-TV, rebroadcasting KVII-TV, on January 29, 1976.
