= WDBJ =

Television station in Roanoke, Virginia

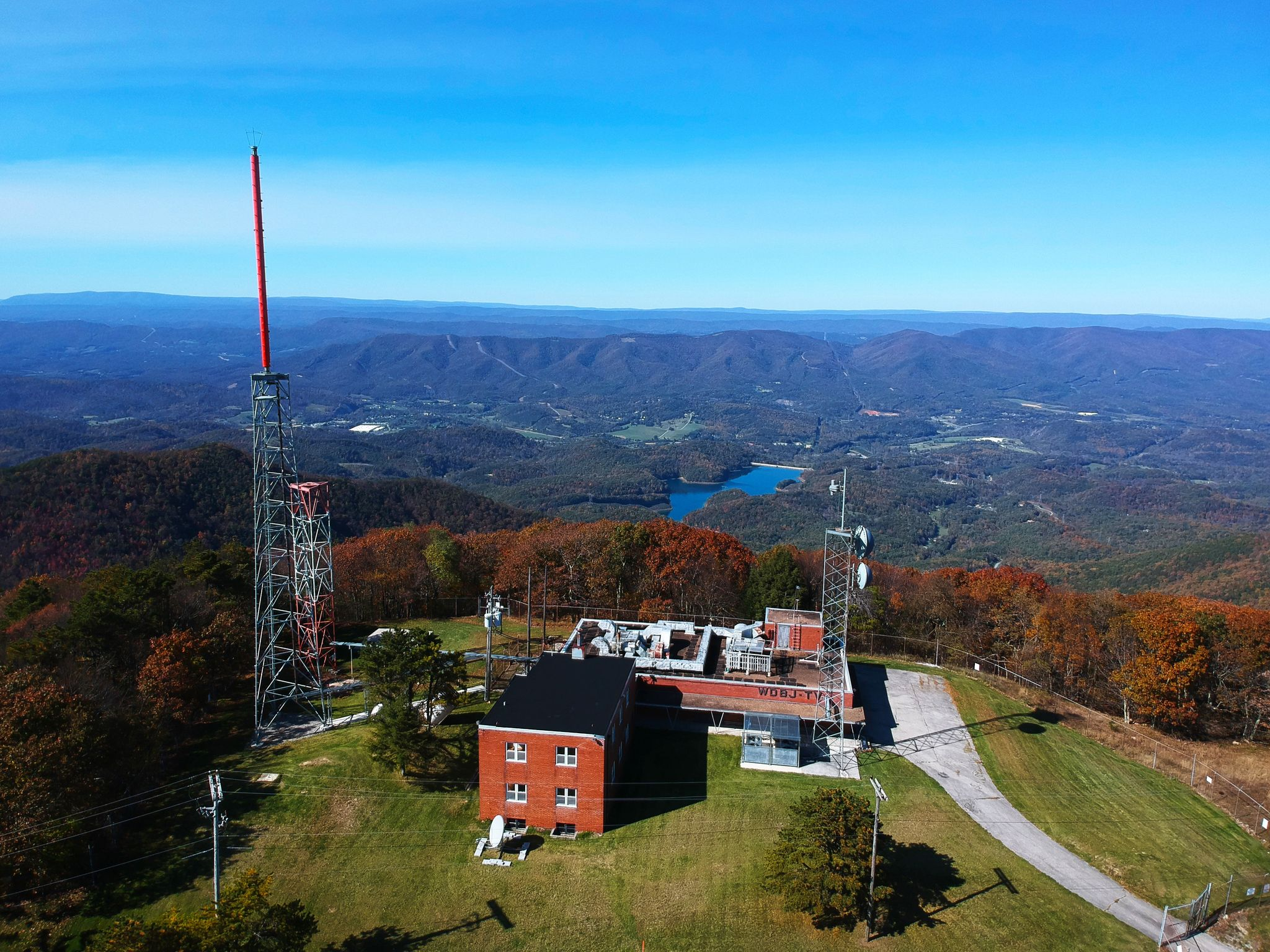
- WDBJ transmitter complex on Poor Mountain in Roanoke County
- Roanoke–Lynchburg, Virginia; United States
- City: Roanoke, Virginia
- Channels: Digital: 30 (UHF), shared with WZBJ; Virtual: 7
- Branding: WDBJ 7

Programming
- Affiliations: 7.1: CBS; for others, see § Subchannels

Ownership
- Owner: Gray Media; (Gray Television Licensee, LLC)
- Sister stations: WZBJ

History
- Founded: March 31, 1955
- First air date: October 3, 1955
- Former call signs: WDBJ-TV (1955–1983)
- Former channel numbers: Analog: 7 (VHF, 1955–2009); Digital: 18 (UHF, 2002–2019)
- Former affiliations: NTA (secondary, 1956–1961); UPN (secondary, 1995-1997)
- Call sign meaning: derived from former sister station WDBJ radio (now WFIR), call letters were randomly assigned by the FCC when it was licensed in 1924

Technical information
- Licensing authority: FCC
- Facility ID: 71329
- ERP: 1,000 kW
- HAAT: 603.6 m (1,980 ft)
- Transmitter coordinates: 37°11′42.7″N 80°9′22.1″W

Links
- Public license information: Public file; LMS
- Website: www.wdbj7.com

WDBJ (channel 7) is a television station licensed to Roanoke, Virginia, United States, serving as the CBS affiliate for the Roanoke–Lynchburg market. It is owned by Gray Media alongside Danville-licensed MyNetworkTV affiliate WZBJ, channel 24 (and its Lynchburg-licensed Class A translator WZBJ-CD, channel 24). WDBJ and WZBJ share studios on Hershberger Road in northwest Roanoke; through a channel sharing agreement, the two stations transmit using WDBJ's spectrum from an antenna on Poor Mountain in Roanoke County.

== History ==
=== Early history ===
WDBJ-TV first signed on the air on October 3, 1955. It was owned by the Times-World Corporation, publishers of the Roanoke Times and Roanoke World-News, alongside WDBJ radio (960 AM, now WFIR; and 94.9 FM, now WSLC-FM). Channel 7 has been a CBS affiliate since its sign-on, owing to WDBJ radio's longtime affiliation with the CBS Radio Network. WDBJ-TV was the third television station to sign-on from Roanoke, after NBC affiliate WSLS-TV (channel 10) and WROV-TV (channel 27, frequency later occupied by WFXR), which operated as an independent station from February to July 1953. Before channel 7 signed on, CBS programming had been carried part-time on Lynchburg-based WLVA-TV (channel 13, now WSET-TV). During the late 1950s, WDBJ was also briefly affiliated with the NTA Film Network.

For close to two years, the station's construction permit was heavily contested between Times-World and the owners of WROV-TV, who relinquished their UHF license (the station went dark in July 1953) in order to battle for channel 7. The two-way contest virtually ended in January 1955, when the WROV group relinquished their application and sold their television assets to WDBJ. The Times-World Corp. would be awarded the channel 7 construction permit two months later.

Channel 7, along with its radio sisters, originally operated from studio facilities located in the Mountain Trust Bank Building in downtown Roanoke. Its transmitter was located temporarily on Mill Mountain; the station originally planned to transmit its signal from Poor Mountain, but was not able to do so due to concerns regarding interference with the signal of WSPA-TV in Spartanburg, South Carolina, whose broadcasting facilities were under construction at the time. In 1956, WDBJ radio and television moved their operations to the Times-World Building; the television station also relocated its transmitter to Poor Mountain.

Due to its affiliation with the Times and Virginia's second-oldest radio station (AM 960 had signed on in 1924), WDBJ-TV overtook WSLS-TV as the area's highest-rated station within three years of its sign-on. It has remained in the lead more or less ever since. As channel 7 grew during the late 1950s, plans were drawn for a new studio at the corner of Brandon and Colonial Avenues in southwest Roanoke. The WDBJ stations moved to the then state-of-the-art building in the summer of 1961.

=== Schurz Communications ownership ===
Longtime WDBJ logo, used from the 1970s until late July 2012. The "7" in the current logo is based on this classic logo, enhanced for HD.

In 1969, Times-World merged with Norfolk-based Landmark Communications. The merger came one year after the Federal Communications Commission (FCC) barred the co-ownership of broadcast outlets and newspapers, while "grandfathering" existing newspaper-broadcasting combinations in several markets. With the Landmark merger, the WDBJ stations lost their grandfathered protection and could not be retained by the merged company. As a result, channel 7 was sold to South Bend, Indiana-based Schurz Communications. It is not likely that the FCC would have allowed Landmark to keep WDBJ-TV in any event due to a significant signal overlap with Landmark-owned WFMY-TV in Greensboro, North Carolina. Channel 7's analog city-grade signal reached Patrick County, which is part of the Triad market. It provided at least grade B coverage as far south as Reidsville, North Carolina. At the time, the FCC normally did not allow common ownership of two television stations with overlapping signals, and would not even consider granting a waiver for a city-grade overlap.

Times-World also sold the WDBJ radio stations to separate owners. Channel 7 retained the WDBJ-TV call sign, though it officially dropped the -TV suffix in November 1983.

In 1979, WDBJ-TV opened a news bureau in Lynchburg, known as the Central Virginia Bureau, which provided reports focusing on the eastern part of the Roanoke–Lynchburg market (from Charlottesville to Danville); weekend anchor Graham Wilson served as the bureau chief. In the 1980s, the station aired a series of promotional programming and station image spots featuring the popular "Ernest P. Worrell" character portrayed by Jim Varney.

In 2000, WDBJ announced plans to construct a new studio facility on the site of the Best Products building in northwest Roanoke—which was demolished that June—which was designed for high definition broadcasting. WDBJ began broadcasting from the new facility on April 20, 2002.

On July 1, 2007, Jeffery A. Marks was named as the station's general manager, succeeding longtime GM Bob Lee (Marks became only the fourth general manager in the station's history). That same year, the station converted its news department to a tapeless operation, switching to a server-based playback system.

In the spring of 2010, Schurz Communications entered into a website management partnership with Tribune Interactive, in which the content management system operator would assume responsibilities for operating the websites of Schurz's media properties (with the exception of NBC affiliate WAGT in Augusta, Georgia, which was operated by Media General through a shared services agreement with ABC affiliate WJBF). Schurz's Kansas television properties (KWCH-DT and KSCW-DT) were the first to launch new Tribune-run sites in late June of that year, with WDBJ following suit in mid-July. This lasted until mid-2013, when Internet Broadcasting began operating the WDBJ website.

Schurz Communications announced on September 14, 2015, that it would exit broadcasting and sell its television and radio stations, including WDBJ, to Gray Television for $442.5 million. This would make WDBJ a sister station to WCAV (which it no longer is) and WHSV-TV in Charlottesville and Harrisonburg, respectively. The FCC approved the sale on February 12, 2016. and the sale was completed on February 16.

== WDBJ-DT2 ==
WDBJ-DT2 is the second digital subchannel of WDBJ, which serves as an affiliate of the Black-oriented multicast network 365BLK. It broadcasts in 16:9 widescreen standard definition on channel 7.2.

=== Background ===
Original logo of WDBJ-DT2 as "7 Too", used from 2004 to 2006.

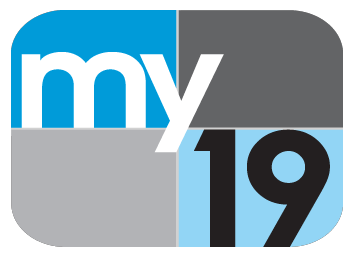
Logo of WDBJ-DT2 used between September 5, 2006, and August 31, 2018, under the "My19" branding.

WDBJ launched its second digital subchannel in 2004 as "7 Too," an independent service which carried rebroadcasts of WDBJ newscasts along with some syndicated programming; the channel also aired special event programming, such as sporting events sourced from Raycom Sports and occasionally by CBS Sports, and the entirety of the 2004 Republican and Democratic conventions.

On February 22, 2006, News Corporation (which would later spin off its American television properties into 21st Century Fox in July 2013) announced the launch of MyNetworkTV, a new network that would be operated by two of its divisions, Fox Television Stations and Twentieth Television. MyNetworkTV was created to compete against another upstart network that would launch at the same time that September, The CW – a network created through a partnership between CBS Corporation and Time Warner, which had announced one month earlier on January 24 that the two companies would respectively shut down UPN and The WB, which originally consisted primarily of the higher-rated programs from its two predecessors; MyNetworkTV was also formed to give UPN- and WB-affiliated stations that were not named as The CW's charter affiliates another option besides converting into independent stations. When the network debuted on September 5, 2006, WDBJ-DT2 became the MyNetworkTV affiliate for the Roanoke-Lynchburg market; WWCW (channel 21) became the market's CW affiliate when that network launched two weeks later on September 18.

Debuting with the subchannel's MyNetworkTV affiliation, WDBJ began producing a half-hour weeknight 10 p.m. newscast on "My19", which maintains an alternative format to the newscasts seen on WDBJ's main channel, providing "anchor movement" to a different set after each commercial break and includes a "Fun Fact" feature during each newscast, which is associated with one of the stories featured on that evening's broadcast. As of 2015, the newscast is currently anchored by Melissa Gaona, meteorologist Robin Reed, and sports director Travis Wells. The program is WDBJ's second attempt at a prime time newscast; the station previously produced a 10 p.m. newscast, titled News 7 Primetime, for religious independent station WEFC (channel 38, now Ion Television owned-and-operated station WPXR-TV) from September 1996 to August 1997; that program was canceled due to low ratings.

In June 2018, the MyNetworkTV affiliation moved to WLHG-CD, which was simulcast in 16:9 widescreen standard definition on WDBJ's third digital subchannel (remapped to virtual channel 43.1) for full-market over-the-air coverage; the 7.2 subchannel then began to carry the Decades network. On September 1, 2018, MyNetworkTV moved to WZBJ (channel 24), which operates on WDBJ's spectrum; a simulcast was retained in Lynchburg on WLHG-CD, which was renamed WZBJ-CD. Concurrently, Decades moved to the third subchannel of WZBJ-CD, and Heroes & Icons moved to WDBJ's 7.2 subchannel.

== Programming ==
Reruns of The Andy Griffith Show were a fixture at 5:30 p.m. on weekdays starting in 1984. The show was something of a local tradition, regularly coming in as the far-and-away ratings winner in the timeslot. Griffith remained at 5:30 p.m. for 35 years; as it continued to win the timeslot against first-run syndicated programming and competing local newscasts even at the end of its run, WDBJ management was hesitant to remove it from their schedule even after it started to drag down the station's own newscast ratings. After the launch of co-owned WZBJ in 2018 provided an option to relocate the show, WDBJ debuted a 5:30 p.m. newscast on April 1, 2019.

=== News operation ===
WDBJ presently broadcasts 34 1/2 hours of locally produced newscasts each week (with 5 1/2 hours each weekday, three hours on Saturdays and four hours on Sundays). Until April 1, 2019, when WDBJ added a half-hour weeknight newscast at 5:30 p.m., it was unlike most CBS-affiliated stations in the Eastern Time Zone when it did not produce a newscast at that timeslot due to the continued carriage of The Andy Griffith Show.

In addition, the station produces the sports program Friday Football Extra (which airs Friday nights following the 11 p.m. newscast during the high school football season) and broadcasts Virginia Tech Sports Today (a university-produced program which airs Sundays during the Virginia Tech Hokies football and basketball seasons). In addition to the newsroom at its main studios in Roanoke, WDBJ also maintains newsrooms in Lynchburg/Bedford, New River Valley, Danville, and Lexington.

For the better part of the last 60 years, WDBJ has led the news ratings in Roanoke, in particular, WDBJ's 6 and 11 p.m. newscasts are viewed by an estimated average of 92,000 households within the market. In recent years, however, WDBJ has been in a spirited three-way battle for first with WSLS and WSET.

In 2006, WDBJ entered into a news content partnership with its former radio sister, WFIR. In August 2006, WDBJ added an outdoor "Weather Deck" outside of the station's studios, providing a controlled new location for weather and news segments conducted outdoors. In addition to the "Weather Deck", the station also has a "Weather Garden" outside its Roanoke studio; WDBJ often presents feature packages about the "Weather Garden" and offers tips, advice and ideas about common gardening from that area.

On August 13, 2007, WDBJ became the only television station in the Roanoke-Lynchburg market to employ four meteorologists as part of its weather staff. WDBJ's weather department also serves as the market's broadcast partner in the WeatherBug real-time automated weather observation network, which offers real-time observation and same-day almanac data from 24 weather stations located around the region within the WDBJ viewing area. On April 22, 2008, WDBJ began broadcasting its local newscasts in high definition; the station also became the first in the Roanoke–Lynchburg market with high-definition weather graphics.

In 2012, WDBJ began to phase out the longstanding News 7 branding for its newscasts, shifting to "Your Hometown News Leader: WDBJ 7"–playing on its longtime slogan, "Your Hometown Station". Newscast titles no longer reference a specific time, except for the morning newscast which is still titled Mornin'. WDBJ's also rebranded its weather department under the "First Alert Weather" brand, replacing the longtime moniker of "Skytracker 7".

==== Notable former on-air staff ====
- Ann Compton – reporter
- Chris Hurst – reporter and partner of Alison Parker
- Alison Parker and Adam Ward – reporters, murdered during a live interview
- Mike Randall – reporter
- Robin Reed (AMS Certified Broadcast Meteorologist Seal of Approval) – Anchor
- Cecily Tynan – reporter and weather anchor

== Controversies ==
=== Political ad refusal ===
In July 2009, WDBJ announced that it would refuse to air a political advertisement from the National Republican Congressional Committee attacking Democratic Representative Tom Perriello's position on climate change, citing "factual inaccuracies".

=== Indecent content fine ===
On March 23, 2015, the FCC issued a $325,000 fine against WDBJ—the largest levied against a television station in the agency's history for a one-time instance of indecent content—for a story aired on the station's 6 p.m. newscast in July 2012 for airing sexually explicit material outside of the designated safe harbor period (between 10 p.m. and 6 a.m.). The report, which centered a former female porn actress who became a volunteer EMT for a Roanoke area rescue squad, featured a brief image from an adult website showing the subject of the report (who was not nude or engaged in a sexual act) that included a video clip of a hand stroking a penis unblurred which appeared within the safe area of the editing suite while the story was being packaged, but was visible on the edge of the screen when it was broadcast. Schurz Communications stated that it would challenge the fine, contending the images were fleeting (lasting only three seconds) and small enough to not be visible for many viewers.

=== 2015 murders of reporting crew ===
On August 26, 2015, WDBJ reporter Alison Parker and photojournalist Adam Ward were fatally shot during a live report on that day's edition of Mornin' at the Bridgewater Plaza in Moneta. Their killer was later identified as Vester Lee Flanagan II, a multimedia journalist who worked under the professional pseudonym "Bryce Williams" and was employed by WDBJ from 2012 to 2013 until he was fired. Flanagan died that afternoon at a hospital from self-inflicted gunshot wounds after he was approached by police on I-66 in Fauquier County. Smith Mountain Lake Regional Chamber of Commerce director Vicki Gardner, who was being interviewed by Parker before the shooting, was the only survivor and was hospitalized with gunshot wounds to the back.

== Technical information ==
=== Subchannels ===
Subchannels of WDBJ and WZBJ
License	Subchannel	Res.	Short name	Programming
WDBJ	7.1	1080i	WDBJ	CBS
WDBJ	7.2	480i	WDBJ365	365BLK
WDBJ	7.3	480i	HEROES	Heroes & Icons
WDBJ	7.4	480i	JUSTICE	True Crime Network
WZBJ	24.1	720p	WZBJ	Independent with MyNetworkTV
WZBJ	24.4	480i	DABL	Dabl

=== Analog-to-digital conversion ===
WDBJ discontinued regular programming on its analog signal, over VHF channel 7, on June 12, 2009, the official date on which full-power television stations in the United States transitioned from analog to digital broadcasts under federal mandate. The station's digital signal remained on its pre-transition UHF channel 18, using virtual channel 7.

== Out-of-market cable and satellite coverage ==
WDBJ is also carried on cable providers on the West Virginia side of the Bluefield–Beckley, West Virginia television market; the station had served as the default CBS affiliate for the West Virginia side of that market until WVSX (now WVNS-TV) became a CBS affiliate in 2001.

WDBJ is also available on cable systems in Pocahontas County, West Virginia (including Snowshoe), and as far east as Clarksville and South Boston, as far west as Glade Spring, Marion, Grundy (on digital cable only), Clintwood and Norton (all five of which are part of the Tri-Cities market), and as far south as Galax and Martinsville in Virginia and Person, Caswell and Rockingham counties in North Carolina. Person County is part of the Raleigh–Durham market, while Caswell and Rockingham are part of the Greensboro–Winston-Salem–High Point market. In Virginia, DirecTV offers WDBJ in several areas in Mecklenburg and Patrick counties located outside of the Roanoke–Lynchburg market. In North Carolina, DirecTV offers WDBJ in Alleghany County, which is part of the Greensboro–Winston-Salem–High Point market.

== See also ==
- Channel 7 virtual TV stations in the United States
- Channel 18 digital TV stations in the United States
- Channel 19 branded TV stations in the United States
