= WZBJ-CD =

Television station in Lynchburg, Virginia

ATSC 3.0 station Translator of WZBJ, Danville, Virginia
- Lynchburg–Roanoke, Virginia; United States
- City: Lynchburg, Virginia
- Channels: Digital: 19 (UHF); Virtual: 24
- Branding: WZBJ 24

Programming
- Affiliations: 24.1: Independent with MyNetworkTV; 24.2: Cozi TV; 24.3: Catchy Comedy

Ownership
- Owner: Gray Media; (Gray Television Licensee, LLC)
- Sister stations: WDBJ, WZBJ

History
- Founded: July 28, 1989
- First air date: January 23, 1991
- Former call signs: W19BC (1991–2000); WTLU-CA (2000–2012); WTLU-LD (2007–2012); WTLU-CD (2012–2015); WLHG-CD (2015–2018)
- Former channel numbers: Analog: 19 (UHF, 1991–2004), 50 (UHF, 2004–2012); Digital: 43 (UHF, 2010–2019)
- Former affiliations: FamilyNet (1991); Religious (1991–2018)
- Call sign meaning: Taken from WDBJ

Technical information
- Licensing authority: FCC
- Facility ID: 168095
- Class: CD
- ERP: 15 kW
- HAAT: 190.4 m (625 ft)
- Transmitter coordinates: 37°21′33.5″N 79°9′32″W

Links
- Public license information: Public file; LMS
- Website: www.wdbj7.com/page/wzbj24/

WZBJ-CD (channel 24) is a low-power, Class A television station licensed to Lynchburg, Virginia, United States. It is a translator of Danville-licensed WZBJ (channel 24), an independent station with MyNetworkTV, which is owned by Gray Media; the WZBJ stations collectively serve as a sister outlet to Roanoke-licensed CBS affiliate WDBJ (channel 7). WZBJ-CD's transmitter is located on Candlers Mountain near the campus of the station's former owner, Liberty University; its parent station shares studios with WDBJ on Hershberger Road in northwest Roanoke.

== History ==
The station first came on the air on January 23, 1991, as W19BC channel 19, a translator station for FamilyNet, a network owned at the time by Liberty University founder Jerry Falwell. On September 1, 1991, W19BC began originating programming and became a 24/7 local LPTV station. In 2000, it changed its callsign to WTLU-CA. The station previously branded itself as HopeNow.tv. The station's digital transmitter, WTLU-LD on channel 43, signed on in 2010; in 2012, the analog WTLU-CA transmitter went dark, and its Class A status was transferred to the digital license as WTLU-CD. The call letters changed to WLHG-CD in 2015.

On April 30, 2018, Gray Television announced it would purchase WLHG-CD from Liberty University for $50,000. Under the terms of the transaction, Gray would hold an option agreement to acquire WFFP-TV, and enter into a shared services agreement (to take effect on June 15), whereby Gray would provide programming for and receive a share of the programming and advertising revenue accrued by WLHG-CD and WFFP, which would in turn become sister stations to Gray's existing property in the Roanoke–Lynchburg market, CBS affiliate WDBJ, a station that shares its physical channel spectrum with WFFP.

Gray took control of WLHG-CD as scheduled on June 15. On the same day, it began simulcasting WDBJ's MyNetworkTV subchannel "My 19" on WLHG-CD. While the station moved to Gray's control, the station's virtual channel system was not in use, rendering WLHG-CD's channels temporarily as 43.3 and 43.4. On September 1, 2018, the call letters were changed to WZBJ-CD, and it began sharing virtual channel 24 with the full-power WZBJ license (which concurrently changed call letters from WFFP-TV).

== Conversion to ATSC 3.0 ==
In September 2022, WZBJ-CD dropped the ATSC 1.0 transmission in favor of ATSC 3.0 (NextGen TV). WZBJ-CD is operating as a 'lighthouse' station and broadcasting the main sub channel feeds of the other Roanoke / Lynchburg stations. Initially, the stations were offered in the same format of 1080i and 720p as broadcast by the ATSC 1.0 stations, but were upgraded to 1080p for CBS, NBC and MyN.

== Subchannels ==
The station's ATSC 1.0 channels are carried on the multiplexed signals of other Lynchburg television stations:

Subchannels provided by WZBJ-CD (ATSC 1.0)
Subchannel	Res.	Short name	Programming	ATSC 1.0 host
24.1	1080i	WZBJ24	Simulcast of WZBJ / MyNetworkTV	WSET-TV
24.2	480i	Cozi	Cozi TV	WWCW
24.3	480i	Decades	Catchy Comedy	WWCW

WZBJ-CD itself broadcasts the principal commercial stations in the market, and itself, in ATSC 3.0 format.

Subchannels of WZBJ-CD (ATSC 3.0)
Subchannel	Res.	Short name	Programming
7.1	1080p	WDBJ	CBS (WDBJ)
10.1	1080p	WSLS-HD	NBC (WSLS-TV)
13.1	720p	WSET HD	ABC (WSET-TV)
13.10	1080p	T2	T2
13.11	1080p	PBTV	Pickleballtv
21.2	720p	WFXR-HD	Fox (WFXR)
24.1	1080p	WZBJ-CD	MyNetworkTV (WZBJ)

Subchannel streamed via the Internet
