= WZBJ =

Television station in Danville, Virginia

- Danville–Roanoke–Lynchburg, Virginia; United States
- City: Danville, Virginia
- Channels: Digital: 30 (UHF), shared with WDBJ; Virtual: 24
- Branding: WZBJ 24

Programming
- Affiliations: 24.1: Independent with MyNetworkTV; CBS (alternate); 24.4: Dabl

Ownership
- Owner: Gray Media; (Gray Television Licensee, LLC)
- Sister stations: WDBJ, WZBJ-CD

History
- Founded: March 3, 1988
- First air date: August 18, 1994
- Former call signs: WDRG (1994–1997); WDRL-TV (1997–2011); WEFC-TV (2011–2014); WTLU (2014–2015); WFFP-TV (2015–2018)
- Former channel numbers: Analog: 24 (UHF, 1994–2008); Digital: 41 (UHF, 2003–2008), 24 (UHF, 2008–2018), 18 (UHF, 2018–2019)
- Former affiliations: Independent (1994–1995, 2006–2013, 2014–2015); The WB (1995–1997); UPN (1997–2006); Dark (2013–2014); Cozi TV (2015–2018)
- Call sign meaning: Disambiguation of WDBJ

Technical information
- Licensing authority: FCC
- Facility ID: 15507
- ERP: 1,000 kW
- HAAT: 603.6 m (1,980 ft)
- Transmitter coordinates: 37°11′42.7″N 80°9′22.1″W
- Translator(s): WZBJ-CD 24 (19 UHF) Lynchburg

Links
- Public license information: Public file; LMS
- Website: www.wdbj7.com/page/wzbj24/

WZBJ (channel 24) is a television station licensed to Danville, Virginia, United States, serving the Roanoke–Lynchburg market. It is programmed primarily as an independent station, but maintains a secondary affiliation with MyNetworkTV. WZBJ is owned by Gray Media alongside CBS affiliate WDBJ (channel 7); the two stations share studios on Hershberger Road in northwest Roanoke and broadcast from an antenna on Poor Mountain in Roanoke County.

WZBJ-CD (channel 24) in Lynchburg operates as a translator of WZBJ.

== History ==
The channel 24 dial position was once occupied by WBTM-TV, which operated from February 21, 1954, to December 31 of the same year. The station only lasted for nearly a full year before attempting to become a hybrid commercial and educational station. This request to the Federal Communications Commission (FCC) was denied, and WBTM-TV went off the air not long after.

Channel 24 returned to the air on August 18, 1994, as independent station WDRG (the calls standing for its broad service area of Danville, Roanoke and Greensboro, North Carolina). It was founded by MNE Broadcasting, a locally based company owned by businessman Melvin N. Eleazer. Three months after its sign-on, in November 1994, MNE Broadcasting reached an agreement with Time Warner to become the WB affiliate for the Roanoke DMA; the station joined The WB upon the network's launch on January 11, 1995. On January 1, 1997 (as the FCC was switching from using Arbitron's ADI to Nielsen's DMA system to determine which counties remained part of the Roanoke–Lynchburg market, then ranked as the 67th largest in the United States), WDRG changed its call letters to WDRL-TV, standing for Danville–Roanoke–Lynchburg. On that date, the station concurrently became the UPN affiliate for southwestern Virginia; the WB affiliation moved to primary Fox affiliate WFXR (channel 27) and Lynchburg-based satellite WJPR (channel 21), which carried the network's programming on a secondary basis in late night. (Cable viewers could still see The WB at its regular time on WGN-TV's former superstation feed, and programming would later move to cable-only "WBVA-TV", a charter affiliate of The WeB [later known as The WB 100+ Station Group], when it launched on Cox Communications' Roanoke system on September 21, 1998.)

Shortly after this change, WDRL signed on a low-power translator in Roanoke, W54BT (channel 54), to relay WDRL's syndicated and UPN programming into Roanoke, Lynchburg, and the New River Valley. On March 31, 2005, the FCC ordered the Roanoke translator to cease operations to make way for repurposing the frequency for cellular phone signal relays. The transmitter would soon return to the air on UHF channel 24, broadcasting at the same effective radiated power, but with a more directional antenna to protect WDRL's primary analog transmitter.

On January 24, 2006, the Warner Bros. Entertainment unit of Time Warner and CBS Corporation announced that the two companies would shut down The WB and UPN and combine the networks' respective programming to create a new "fifth" network called The CW. On March 28, 2006, it was announced that cable-only WB 100+ affiliate "WBVA" (which adopted the fictional call letters "WCW5-TV" more than two months later as a result) would become the Roanoke–Lynchburg market's CW affiliate. On May 1, 2006, it was announced that WDRL would be converted into an independent station as a result of UPN's pending merger with The CW. "WCW5" formally became a CW affiliate when the network launched just over 4½ months later on September 18.

On March 11, 2007, Liberty University (founded by pastor/televangelist Jerry Falwell) agreed to purchase WDRL from Eleazer; the station would initially continue to operate out its current studios with Eleazer serving as general manager, but would eventually move to Lynchburg, where it would be based along with religious independent WTLU-CA (channel 43, now WZBJ-CD). In May 2008, Liberty University and MNE Broadcasting dissolved the agreement, for unknown reasons. On October 30, 2008, Living Faith Television – whose flagship station is WLFG (channel 68) – announced that it would buy WDRL for $5.25 million. On August 7, 2009, Living Faith Television failed to close due to the expiration date of its contract between the parties.

On July 28, 2010, the United States District Court for the Southern District of West Virginia placed the station into the receivership of Charter Communications. Millard S. Younts, representing Charter, shut down the station's over-the-air transmitter on Smith Mountain. The transmitter closedown was in response to a six-year copyright and financial dispute with Charter, which serves portions of the Roanoke–Lynchburg market. The station's owner appealed the decision.

On December 1, 2011, WDRL-TV changed its call letters to WEFC-TV, which had previously been the callsign for the Roanoke-based station on channel 38 (now operating as Ion Television owned-and-operated station WPXR-TV) from 1986 until 1998. In March 2012, the bankruptcy court approved the sale of WEFC to Jones Broadcasting, owner of WAZT-CA (channel 10, now WDCO-CD) in Woodstock and its repeaters. Jones intended to return the station to the air in August 2012; WEFC was to serve as the company's flagship station, as all of its properties were to be operated from facilities at the Crossroads Mall in Roanoke.

Jones had planned to replace the station's low-power transmitter (which is being operated through special temporary authority) with a transmitter acquired from the Maine Public Broadcasting Network; however, its purchase of the station was called off in April 2013, forcing WEFC to again suspend operations. The receiver continued to find a buyer for the station; in June 2013, a deal was reached to sell WEFC to Morning Star Broadcasting, a subsidiary of Liberty University (marking its second attempt to purchase the station). The new owners changed the station's call letters to WTLU on April 11, 2014. The station's call sign was changed to WFFP-TV on March 6, 2015.

On April 30, 2018, Gray Television announced it would purchase WLHG-CD from Liberty University for $50,000. Under the terms of the transaction, Gray would hold an option agreement to acquire WFFP-TV, and enter into a shared services agreement (to take effect on June 15), whereby Gray would provide programming for and receive a share of the programming and advertising revenue accrued by WFFP-TV and WLHG-CD, which would in turn become sister stations to Gray's existing property in the Roanoke–Lynchburg market, CBS affiliate WDBJ-TV (channel 7). On August 13, 2018, Gray announced that it would change WFFP-TV's call letters to WZBJ effective September 1 and become a MyNetworkTV affiliate (the affiliation had previously been held by a digital subchannel of WDBJ, and in the interim had been transferred to WLHG-CD on June 15, 2018); as part of the relaunch, the station will also add an hour-long extension of WDBJ's weekday morning newscast and a half-hour WDBJ-produced weeknight prime time newscast. On August 16, Gray exercised its option to make an outright purchase of WFFP-TV. The sale was completed on October 1.

== Technical information ==
=== Subchannels ===
The station's signal is multiplexed:

Subchannels of WDBJ and WZBJ
License	Subchannel	Res.	Short name	Programming
WDBJ	7.1	1080i	WDBJ	CBS
WDBJ	7.2	480i	WDBJ365	365BLK
WDBJ	7.3	480i	HEROES	Heroes & Icons
WDBJ	7.4	480i	JUSTICE	True Crime Network
WZBJ	24.1	720p	WZBJ	Independent with MyNetworkTV
WZBJ	24.4	480i	DABL	Dabl

From 1994 until 2008, WDRL-TV's analog broadcast was originated from a transmitter near Pelham, North Carolina, within 2 miles (3.2 km) of the border with Virginia. Coverage in Roanoke and Lynchburg was limited due to the tower's location and relatively short height.

WDRL-DT began broadcasting in digital in 2001 at its Pelham site, at low power. In 2004, the station won permission to move the digital transmitter to Smith Mountain northwestern Pittsylvania County. This location was chosen as it is the highest point east of Poor Mountain, where most of Roanoke's other television stations transmit from. WDRL-DT's Smith Mountain transmitter went on the air in May 2006, providing predicted city grade coverage of Lynchburg and Roanoke, the New River Valley and all of the south side of Virginia. Digital coverage was predicted to extend into the north-central North Carolina counties of Caswell, Rockingham, Person, and Stokes. The station moved its digital signal from channel 41 in December 2008.

=== Analog-to-digital conversion ===
WZBJ (as WDRL-TV) discontinued regular programming on its analog signal, over UHF channel 24, in December 2008. The station's digital signal relocated from its pre-transition UHF channel 41 to channel 24.

On August 1, 2017, it was announced that Liberty University had auctioned off its broadcast spectrum for WFFP-TV on channel 24. WFFP-TV can remain on the frequency for six months, and retained the right to continue broadcasting content by partnering with another broadcast station. On November 22, 2017, a channel sharing agreement with Gray Television-owned CBS affiliate (and future sister station) WDBJ was filed with the FCC. With a move to WDBJ's Poor Mountain transmitter, this would enable WFFP-TV to greatly expand its over-the-air coverage area.
