= Channel 19 branded TV stations in the United States =

The following television stations in the United States formerly branded as channel 19 (though neither using virtual channel 19 nor broadcasting on physical RF channel 19):

- WDBJ-DT2 in Roanoke, Virginia
