= Michael Feldman (radio personality) =

American radio personality

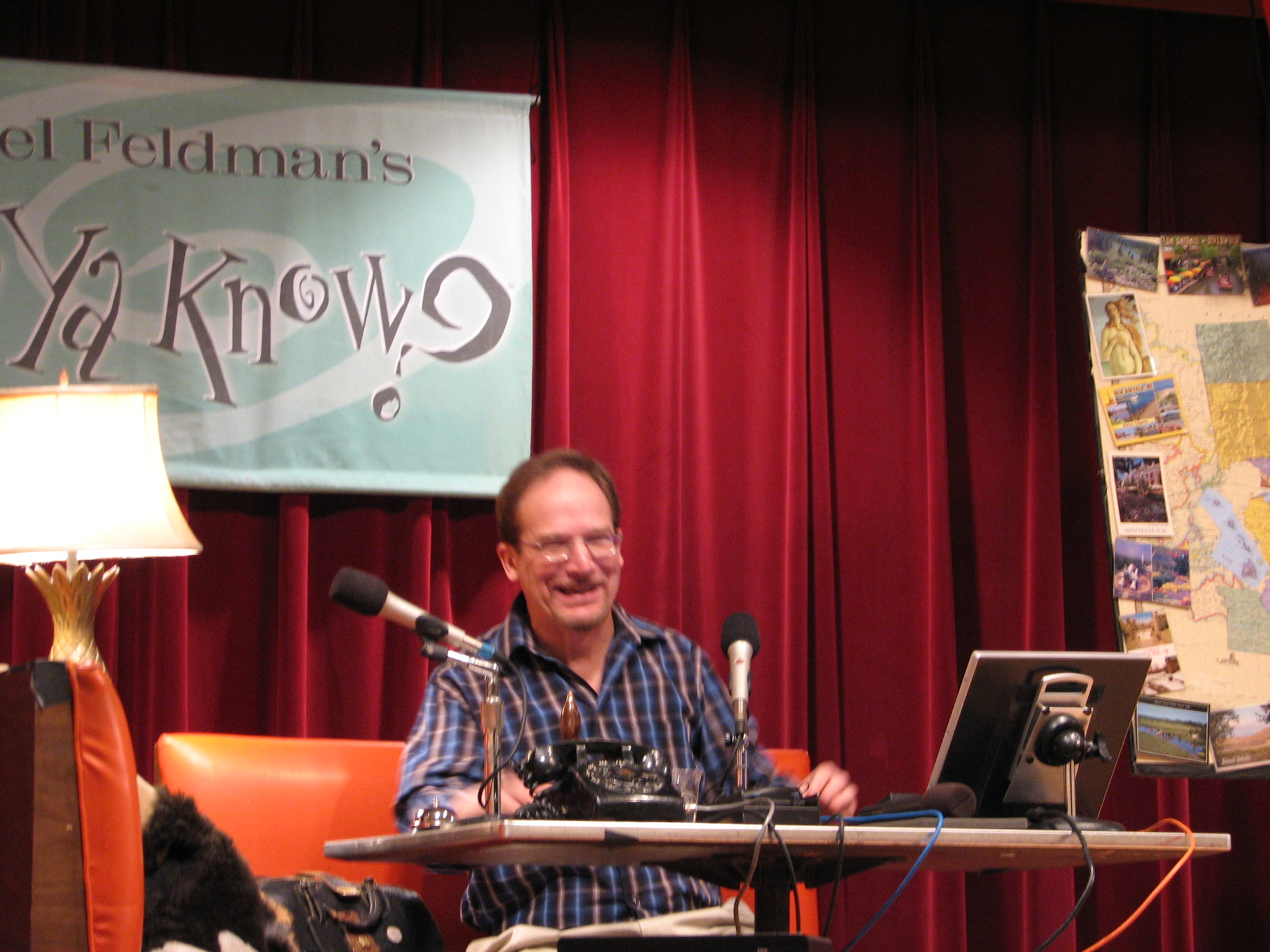
- Feldman in 2009
- Born: March 14, 1949 (age 77); Milwaukee, Wisconsin
- Children: 2
- Presenting career
- Show: Michael Feldman's Whad'Ya Know?
- Network: Public Radio International
- Country: United States
- Website: "Whad'Ya Know?" Program site

Michael Feldman (born March 14, 1949) is an American radio personality. He was the host of Michael Feldman's Whad'Ya Know?, first as a radio show distributed by Public Radio International, and then as a podcast. His former announcer, Jim Packard, referred to him as "The Sage of Wisconsin." He has given himself the title of "Producer Internationale," and often referred to Public Radio International on-air as "The International House of Radio."

Raised in Milwaukee, Wisconsin, Feldman graduated from the University of Wisconsin–Madison with a degree in English in 1970. He worked as a teacher at Malcolm Shabazz City High School in Madison, Wisconsin, before finding work at radio station WORT. Soon after, he worked as a cab driver before coming back to broadcasting, first at Wisconsin Public Radio (WPR) in Madison, then at WGN (AM). His show was canceled by WGN in 1984 and he returned to WPR in 1985 to produce and host Michael Feldman's Whad'Ya Know?, in conjunction with Wisconsin Public Radio for Public Radio International. In 2015 Whad'ya Know? celebrated its 30th anniversary. In 2016, the show was canceled by WPR. Starting in the fall of 2016, Whad'ya Know became available as a podcast. The last episode of the podcast was released on February 2, 2025.

== Books and other media ==
Feldman is the author of several books: Wisconsin Curiosities: Quirky Characters, Roadside Oddities & Other Offbeat Stuff; Something I Said?: Innuendo and Out the Other; Thanks for the Memos; Glad You Asked: Intriguing Names, Facts, and Ideas For the Curious-Minded; Whad'ya Know, Test Your Knowledge; Whad'ya Know?; and Whad'ya Knowledge.

Feldman has produced three CD compilations of his radio show, Roadkill! The Best of Michael Feldman's Whad'ya Know... On the Road and Why Not: Best of Michael Feldman's Whad'ya Know, The First 25 Are the Hardest, a celebration of 25 years of Whad'ya Know, and the music CD Her Country: The Songs of Michael Feldman with John Sieger and the Skeletons.

Feldman also produced a podcast featuring interviews from Whad'ya Know?

== Personal ==
Feldman is married, has two daughters, and lives in the Madison area, where the show was usually staged.
