= WLEE =

WLEE may refer to:

== Current ==
- WLEE (AM), a radio station (1570 AM) licensed to serve Winona, Mississippi, United States
- WLEE-FM, a radio station (95.1 FM) licensed to serve Sherman, Mississippi

== Past ==
- WULT, a radio station (1540 AM) licensed to serve Richmond, Virginia, United States, which held the call sign WLEE in 2016
- WREJ, a radio station (990 AM) licensed to serve Richmond, Virginia, which held the call sign WLEE from 1999 to 2016
- WKLR, a radio station (95.7 FM) licensed to serve Fort Lee, Virginia, which held the call sign WLEE-FM from 1995 to 1997
- WBTL (AM), a radio station (1320 AM) licensed to serve Richmond, Virginia, which held the call sign WLEE from 1989 to 1999
- WLEE (1480 AM), a radio station (1480 AM) licensed to Richmond, Virginia, which broadcast from 1945 to 1988
