= WBTL =

WBTL may refer to:

- WBTL (AM), a radio station (1320 AM) licensed to serve Richmond, Virginia, United States
- WVNZ (AM), a radio station (1450 AM) licensed to serve Highland Springs, Virginia, which held the call sign WBTL from 2018 to 2023
- WULT, a radio station (1540 AM) licensed to serve Sandston, Virginia, which held the call sign WBTL from 2017 to 2018
- WLEE (AM), a radio station (1570 AM) licensed to serve Winona, Mississippi, United States, which held the call sign WBTL from 1958 to 2016
- WBTL-LP, a defunct low-power television station (channel 34) formerly licensed to serve Toledo, Ohio, United States
