= Chimborazo (disambiguation) =

Chimborazo is a volcano in Ecuador.

Chimborazo can also refer to:

- Chimborazo Hospital, American Civil War hospital
- Chimborazo Province, Ecuador
- Battle of Chimborazo, c. 1531, during civil war in Incan Empire
- Chimborazo (Barbados), high point of Saint Joseph, Barbados
- Chimborazo Park, in Richmond, Virginia
- Chimborazo, Virginia
