= Chimborazo Park =

Park and historic land site in Richmond, Virginia, US

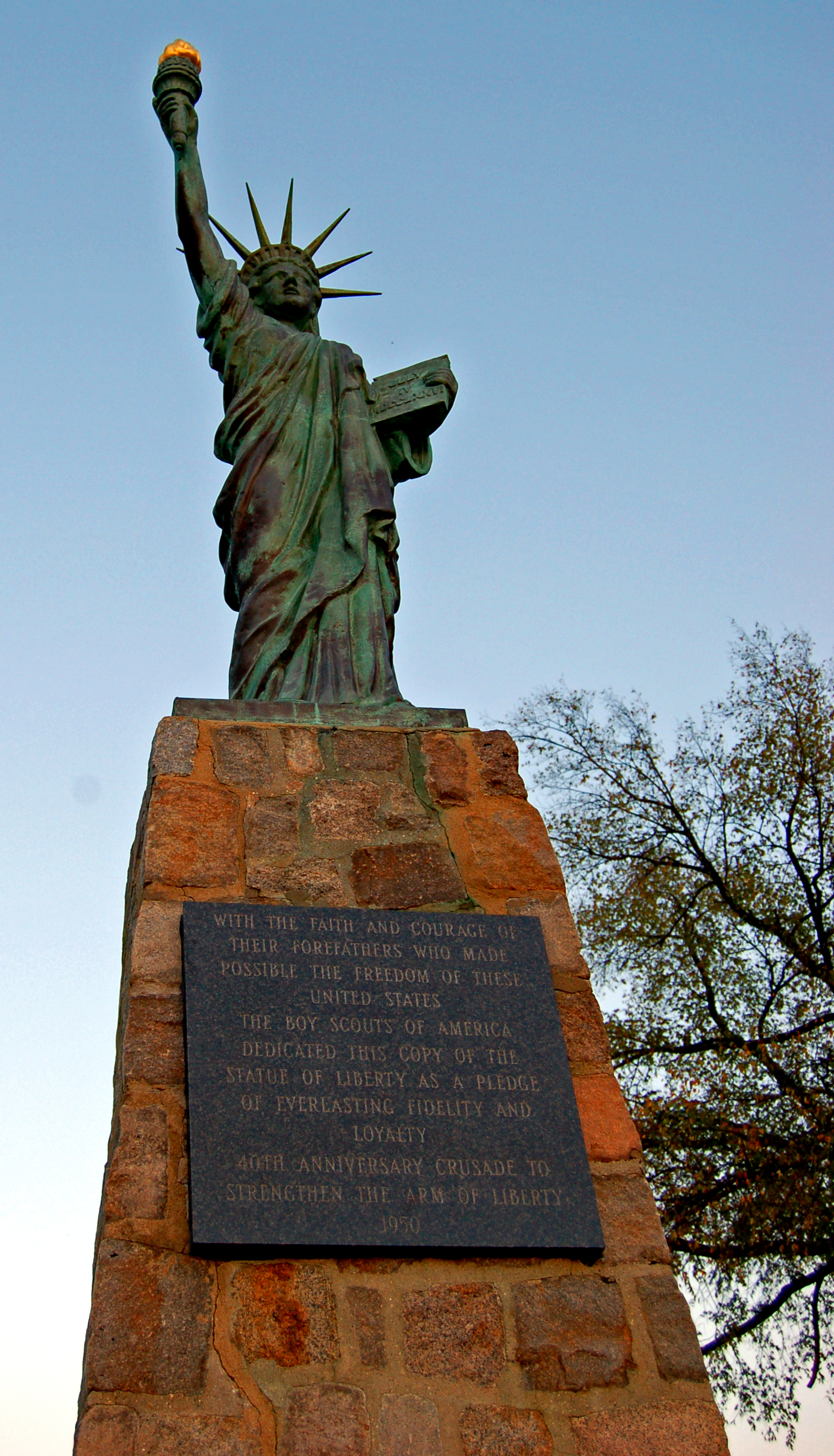
- Strengthen the Arm of Liberty
- Interactive map of Chimborazo Park
- Type: Public Park
- Location: 3201 E. Broad Street; Richmond; Virginia; United States
- Coordinates: 37°31′32″N 77°24′47″W
- Created: 1874
- Oakwood-Chimborazo Historic District
- U.S. National Register of Historic Places
- U.S. Historic district
- Virginia Landmarks Register
- Richmond City Historic District
- Location within Virginia
- Coordinates: 37.4292°N 77.3736°W
- NRHP reference No.: 04001372
- VLR No.: 127-0821

Significant dates
- Added to NRHP: March 18, 2005
- Designated VLR: September 8, 2004

Chimborazo Park is a park and historic land site in Richmond, Virginia, United States. Created in 1874, the park was the site of Chimborazo Hospital, one of the world's largest military hospitals.

== Name ==
The name Chimborazo comes from a volcano in Ecuador. It is believed that the Richmond hill was dubbed Chimborazo around 1802, the year of Alexander von Humboldt’s unsuccessful attempt to scale the mountain in Ecuador. Chimborazo Hill was one of Richmond's "seven hills" and thought to have been so named by a local world-traveler because of its topographical likeness to the Ecuadorian volcano. A brewery had dug cellars in the Richmond hill to store beer. At the top of the cellars was a hole that acted as a chimney. A Richmond newspaper reported that any fire in the cellar would cause "billows of smoke [to come] through making the hill look like a miniature Vesuvius."

Shortly after being suggested as the location for the state Capitol building in 1780, the hill (while unclear as to whether it was yet named Chimborazo) was the assemblage place for a "couple of hundred raw, poorly equipped militia, who were hurriedly corralled and drawn up" to protect Richmond when Benedict Arnold and British troops converged on the city in January, 1781. "When the militia saw what was coming, they decided to a man, to live to fight another day, and skedaddled".

Toward the end of the 18th century and beginning of the 19th century, Chimborazo Heights was said to have been a "favorite dueling ground" and "several lives were thus sacrificed there." Before the war, it was "a common, chiefly occupied by grazing cows and ball-playing, kite-flying boys, and not unfrequently the scene of hard-fought rock-battles between the "Hill boys" and the "Butchertown cats."

Prior to its use as a hospital during the Civil War, the hill had been used to organize the troops coming into Richmond. When the war started, several large regiments camped on and around Chimborazo Hill and built extensive wooden barracks for shelter. As these soldiers went off to the front lines, they left behind as many as 100 nearly-new wooden buildings which were commandeered by Samuel P. Moore, the Surgeon General of the Confederate States of America for the establishment of a hospital. At the time the hospital was established, aside from the barracks constructed by the soldiers, only two buildings were located on the hill: a large house owned by Richard Laughton and a small office building.

On maps pre-dating the Civil War, "Chimborazo Hill" is shown located in Henrico County just to the east of the city line. That portion of Henrico County containing Chimborazo Hill was annexed by Richmond in 1867.

== Chimborazo Hospital ==
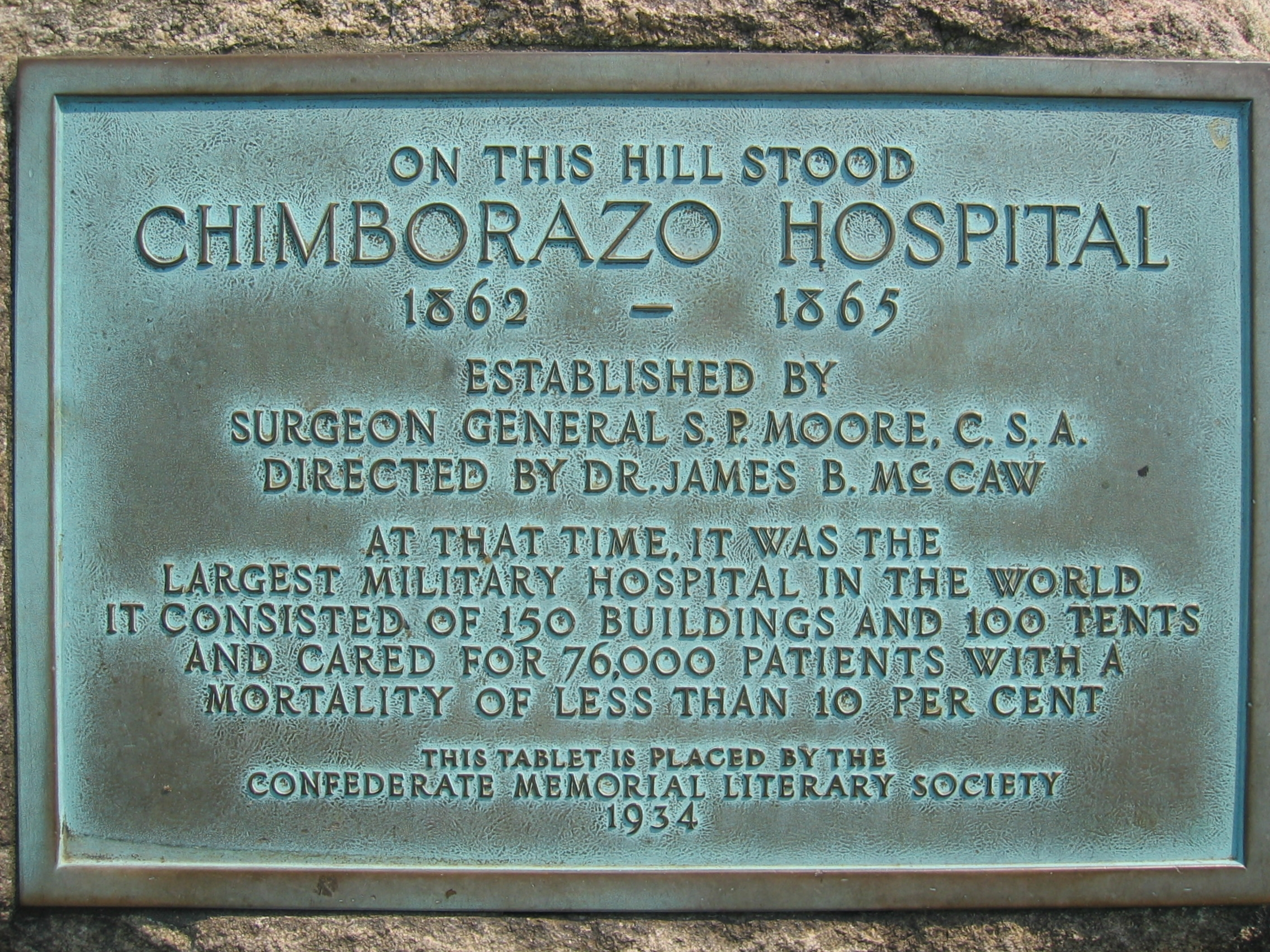
Marker commemorating Chimborazo Hospital

Chimborazo Hospital was a Civil War-era facility built in Richmond, Virginia, to serve the Confederate Army. It functioned between 1862 and 1865, treating over 76,000 wounded Confederate soldiers. It achieved a 9 percent mortality rate. The site is now owned by the National Park Service and is used as a visitor center for Richmond National Battlefield Park.

On the south side of the park, overlooking the James River, is a stone commemorating the hospital; it was placed by the Confederate Memorial Literary Society in 1934. The stone is appropriately sited, overlooking the Confederate Navy Yard on the James River and riverside Rocketts Landing.

A bronze plaque on the stone reads as follows:

On this hill stood
Chimborazo Hospital
1862-1865

Established by Surgeon General S.P. Moore, C.S.A.
Directed by Dr. James B. McCaw.

At that time, it was the largest military hospital in the world. It consisted of 150 buildings and 100 tents and cared for 76,000 patients with a mortality of less than 10 per cent.

This tablet is placed by the
Confederate Memorial Literary Society
1934

== Freedmen's Community (1865-1866) ==
After the end of the Civil War, what was once the largest Confederate hospital in the country became the site of a refuge camp for former slaves, managed by the Freedmen's Bureau. Many of the buildings were used briefly as a day school while other buildings were torn down and the wood used for construction or firewood. The community, however, did not last long as the refuge camp was closed soon after it opened. In March, 1866, the Freedmen's Bureau ordered all able-bodied men to vacate their lodgings in the park by April 1. Over time, the City of Richmond purchased the land piece by piece, in many cases using public condemnation, slowly removing the freedmen's community from Chimborazo Hill. The city council auctioned off the last remaining wooden houses in 1880, removing all traces of the previous community to make way for Chimborazo Park. The last of the structures disappeared around 1900.

== Formation of Chimborazo Park ==
On October 26, 1874, Richmond's Board of Alderman took up a resolution to purchase 35 acres on Richmond's Chimborazo Hill at a cost of $35,000. A report prepared by the Committee on Public Grounds and Buildings noted the importance of public parks:

The opening and improvement of small squares in different parts of the city is not a mere question of ornament and improvement to taxable property, beautifying the city at the same time of increasing its taxable wealth, but is a question of great public benefit – a real health measure, conferring a blessing on the humblest and poorest citizens, while it adds largely to the material prosperity of our whole people. With a densely crowded population, these open spaces will in time prove to be of inestimable value to the city.

A public park is simply an expanded idea of our small squares – "sanitarians" as they are sometimes called. It is the cherished work of every city with any claim to progress and comfort, and is as much the index of material prosperity as it is of the cultivated taste and refinement of an enlightened people.

The report urges an immediate step to secure grounds for a park as an economical measure and investment by the city, as the extensions of our water-works are threatened to be hemmed in with factories and sewers if the city does not secure the ground along our river front with a reasonable distance of the works. The extension of these works must require additional ground, and in providing for a park we can accomplish the two ideas together. This combination of water-works and park grounds is the example of all large cities, and in carrying this out we shall be simply repeating what others have done, with the benefit of all their experiences.

The Committee recommended the issuance of bonds for the purchase of the land and that annual funds be set aside for its upkeep. The resolution was adopted by the Board of Alderman on November 10, 1874.

One of the earliest descriptions of the park was made in The Daily Dispatch, a local Richmond newspaper, covering the maiden round-trip voyage of the steamer The City of Richmond between Richmond and Norfolk on August 27, 1880. The ongoing construction of the park was referenced as “changing it from an eyesore to a thing of beauty – to be a joy forever, in particular for those who approach Richmond by water. From its prominence – towering high above all other hills – it deserves to be handsomely improved. First appearances are everything with the traveler. If he is disgusted with a city upon entering it, afterwards it is difficult to make him see any good in it.” The newspaper proclaimed that once the plans for Chimborazo Park, as well as Libby Hill Park, “are carried out in full, Richmond will present to the stranger who enters her gates by James River a face of unusual charms.”

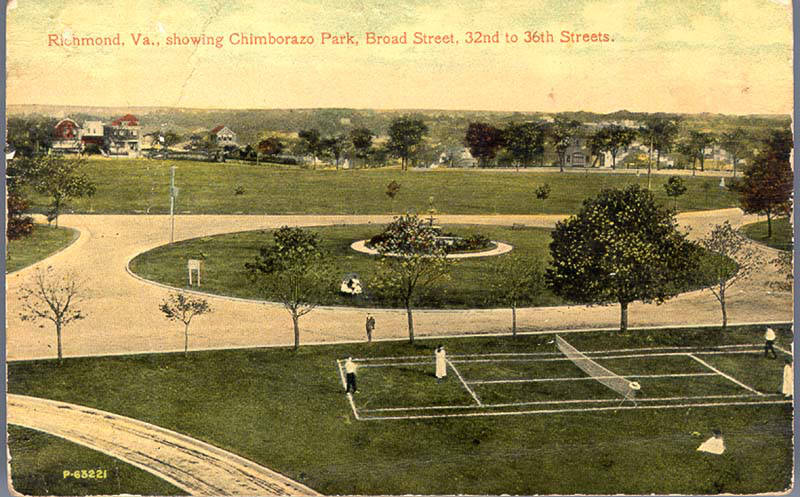
Postcard of Chimborazo Park from the early 20th Century. The card text reads: Chimborazo Park, the joy and pride of the eastern portion of the city, situated on a bluff many feet above James River, from which a beautiful view of the surrounding country may be obtained.

While referred to before its establishment as a park as "naturally picturesque, though at present very unattractive", local newspapers would soon describe the beauty and serenity of the new park. In 1886, it was described as "once occupied by a crowd which made night hideous, is now as lovely a spot as can be found." In later years, it was described as "a park equal in beauty of elevation and perspective to any certainly in this part of the country" (1887), a "place of popular resort" (1897) and "a beautiful and elevated plateau, having a magnificent view of the river for twelve or fourteen miles" (1900). Referring to its height, it was once called "the frowning Gibralter of the range".

During its early phases of development, the neighborhood around Chimborazo Park was advertised as a Suburban Resort, a green landscape offering residents open spaces in which to enjoy fresh air, exercise, participate in various social activities, and admire majestic views of the James River. To draw residents to the park, the city extended a streetcar line to Chimborazo Park in the late 19th century. City officials believed the park would reduce social unrest, increase the physical and mental health of its citizens, provide appropriate spaces for recreation, and provide green buffers between industrialized regions and residential districts.

Over the years, several monuments have been placed in the park to memorialize the city's past. Because of its "conspicuous height" and "commanding position", the park was even suggested as the appropriate location for monuments to Jefferson Davis and Robert E. Lee. as well as a monument to the women of the Confederacy. It was also once suggested as the site for a city trotting park.

Early on, the park was called "progressive" as it was one of the first parks in the city to prohibit walking on the grass, the first to open a municipal playground in the city and the first to screen free movies for the public.

Periodically, calls for changing the name of the park would be made. In 1909, Preston Cocke, a well-known Richmond lawyer, proposed the park be renamed "Maury Park" in honor of Matthew Fontaine Maury, the "Pathfinder of the Seas". In 1910, claiming that "there is no fitness in the name [Chimborazo] applied to anything in Richmond", a call was made to rename the park "Bloody Run Park" in honor of the Battle of Bloody Run which took place nearby in 1656.

Today, the park sits on 27.9 acres owned by the City of Richmond and 5.6 acres owned by the federal government.

The park and parts of the surrounding neighborhood have been designated an historic district by the City and was listed as part of the Oakwood-Chimborazo Historic District on the Virginia Landmarks Register on September 8, 2004 and the National Register of Historic Places on March 18, 2005.

== Chimborazo Medical Museum ==
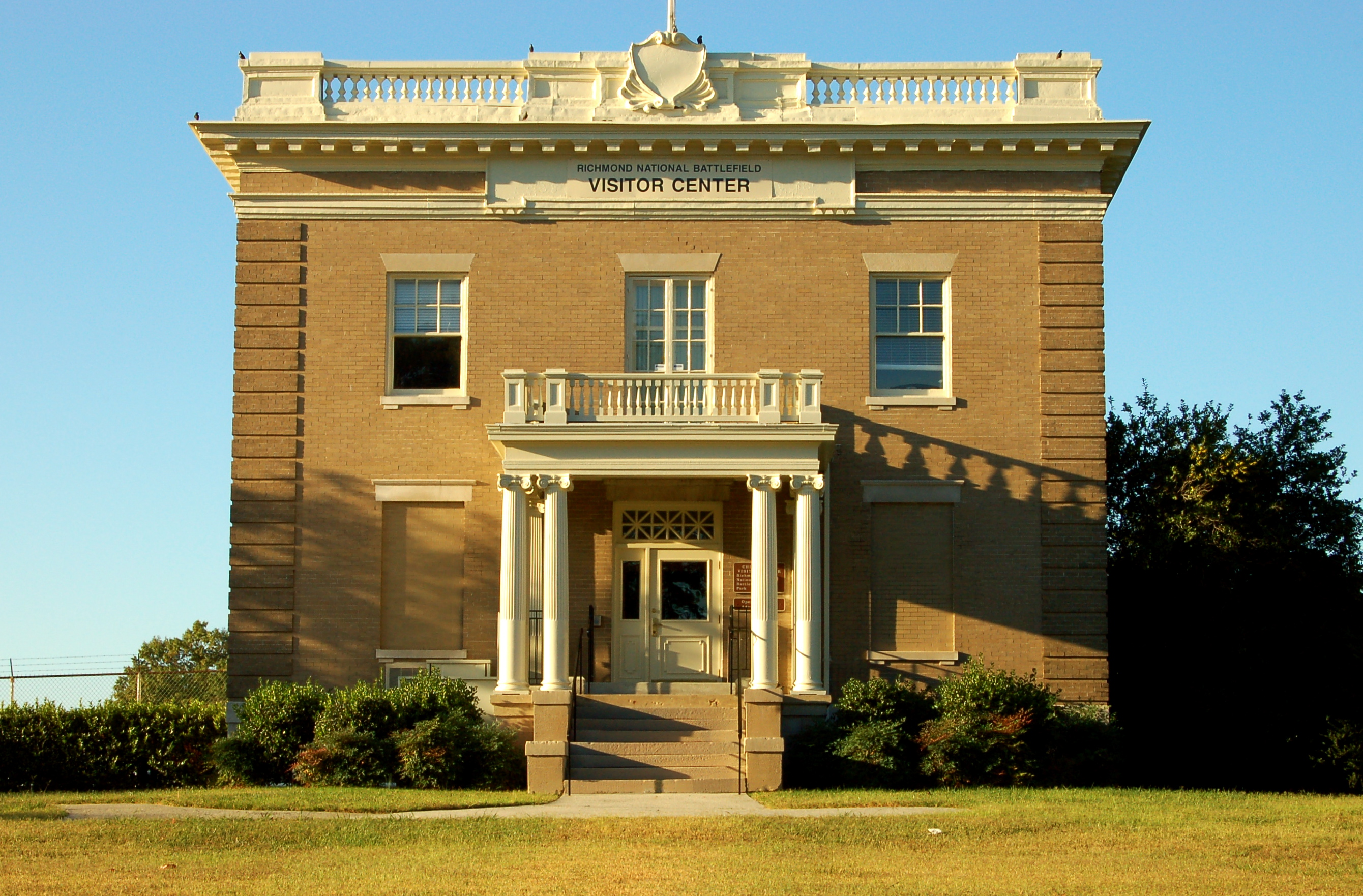
Chimborazo Medical Museum

The Chimborazo Medical Museum is located in the northwest corner of Chimborazo Park (at the corner of East Broad and North 32nd Streets). The museum focuses on the Confederate medical story and contains exhibits on medical equipment and hospital life, including information on the men and women who staffed Chimborazo Hospital. The building is also the headquarters for the Richmond National Battlefield Park and Maggie L. Walker National Historic Site which are located elsewhere in the city.

The building in which the museum is located was originally built as a weather station in 1909 after the federal government bought a 150 square foot plot of land from the city. The U.S. Weather Bureau maintained records of local conditions and tracked extreme weather events at the station from February, 1910 to June, 1953. The highest temperature ever recorded at the station was 107 degrees on August 6, 1918. In 1954, the federal government deeded the building to the City of Richmond.

Richmond explored numerous uses for the building, including a health clinic, a community center, and a shelter for troubled youth, plans which met resistance among neighborhood residents. In 1957, Richmond officials returned the building to the federal government for use as the headquarters for the Richmond National Battlefield Park, administered by the National Park Service.

== Powhatan Stone ==
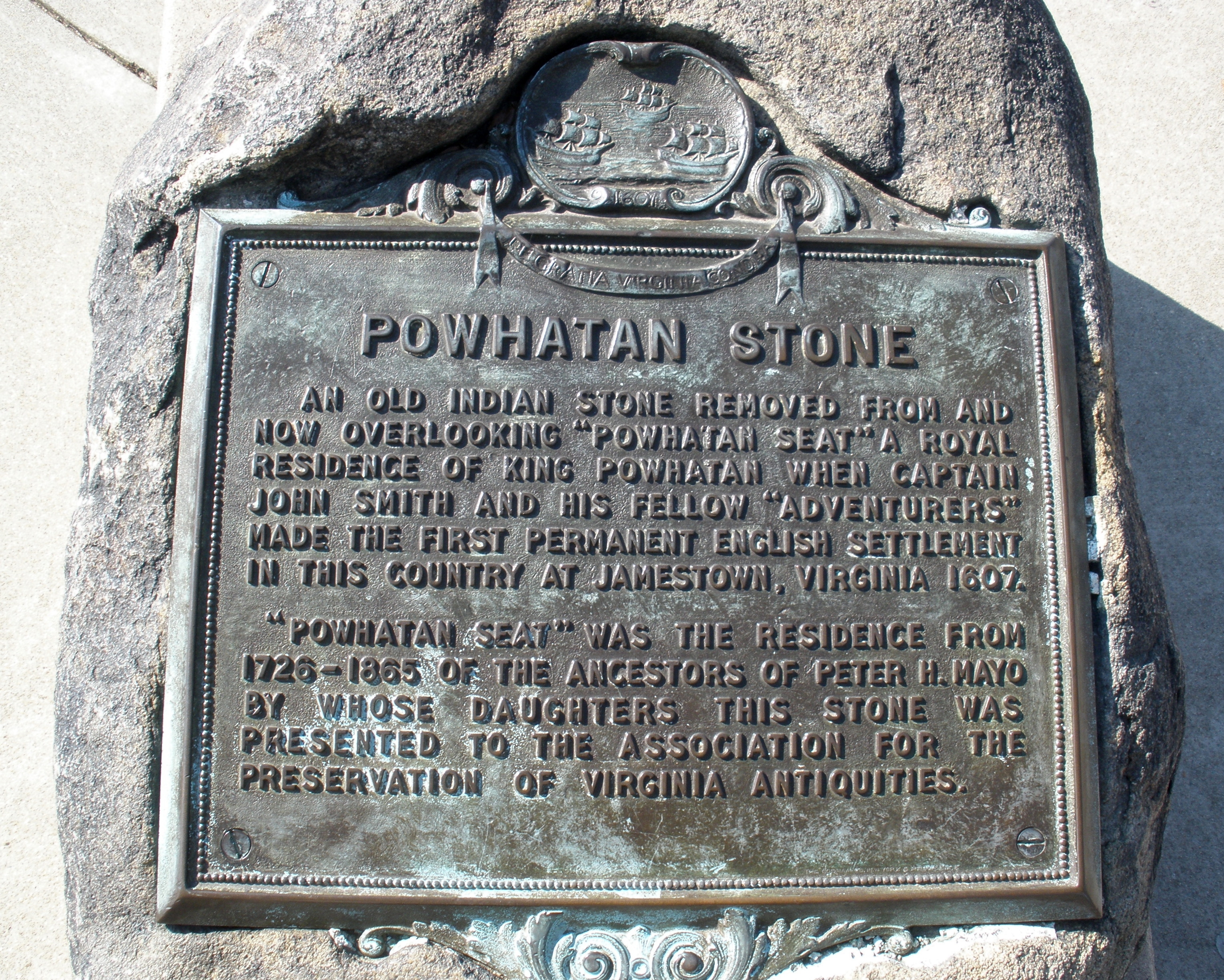
Powhatan Stone

On the south side of the park, overlooking the James River, is a stone commemorating King Powhatan and his relationship with Captain John Smith and the English settlement in Jamestown known as the "Powhatan Stone". The stone was placed in the park in the 1950s by the Association for the Preservation of Virginia Antiquities.

The Mayo family, descendants of the city's original surveyor, William Mayo, had lived for generations at a house on the hill east of Richmond they called "Powhatan’s Seat". The location was likely that of the local village of the Powhatan's own tribe. The family carefully preserved at their house a talisman in the form of a stone said to have formed part of Powhatan's house which was sited in the native village at the falls in Richmond. According to one source, the stone, covered with "Indian designs", also marked the grave of William Mayo. The stone, formerly located along the river, was moved to its present location when it was displaced by the Fulton Gas Works around 1911.

A bronze plaque on the stone reads as follows:

Powhatan Stone

An old Indian Stone removed from and now overlooking "Powhatan Seat" a royal residence of King Powhatan when Captain John Smith and his fellow "adventurers" made the first permanent English settlement in this country at Jamestown, Virginia 1607.

"Powhatan Seat" was the residence from 1726-1865 of the ancestors of Peter H. Mayo by whose daughters this stone was presented to the Association for the Preservation of Virginia Antiquities.;;

== Statue of Liberty ==
A miniature reproduction of the Statue of Liberty was dedicated in Chimborazo Park on February 11, 1951. A gift to the city by the Boy Scouts of Robert E. Lee Council in 1951, it was part of a nationwide campaign to "Strengthen the Arm of Liberty”. A Missourian, Jack P. Whitaker, conceived the idea of copying the original. He had the original made at his own expense and sold copies to Boy Scout councils throughout the country at cost.

More than 100 statues were distributed (Richmond's was No. 136). A local department store furnished the purchase price of $350 to Mr. Whitaker. Every Boy Scout in the council donated 25 cents, their names going on scrolls which were sealed in the statue's base. A contractor and other workers donated their energies, working on the 11-point-star base and walk which would have cost an estimated $4,000.

The dedication ceremony was presided over by Colonel C. W. Woodson, Jr., superintendent of the Virginia State Police, before Richmond's mayor, T. Nelson Parker ((D) 1950-1952), the John Marshall High School Band, a Boy Scout drum and bugle corps and 3,000 people.

A marker on the statue reads as follows:

With the faith and courage of their forefathers who made possible the freedom of these United States the Boy Scouts of America dedicated this copy of the Statue of Liberty as a pledge of everlasting fidelity and loyalty

40th anniversary crusade to Strengthen the Arm of Liberty
1950

== Chimborazo Round House ==
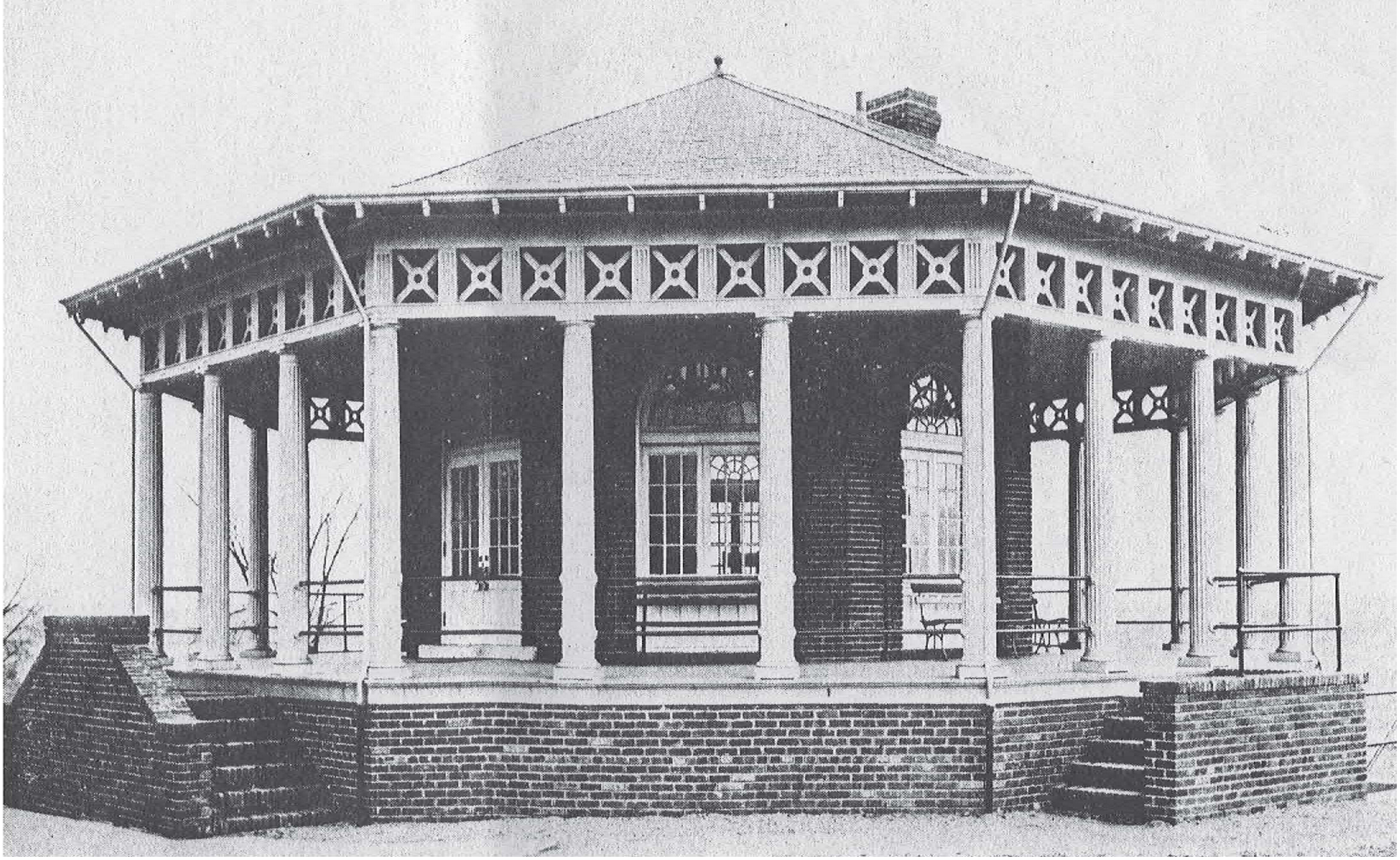
Comfort Station, Chimborazo Park (1915)

On the east side of the park, overlooking Fulton Bottom, sits the Chimborazo Round House built in 1915. Originally built as a comfort station and park house, it replaced two previous buildings on that site.

The original Chimborazo Pavilion was designed by Edgerton S. Rogers and built in 1905. The pavilion boasted a large veranda, which encircled the building, as well as a bandstand. In order to enhance the attractions of the park for the people of Richmond, city officials promoted the pavilion as a site for popular concerts and public events. The expense of providing music and staffing the refreshment stand led the city to convert the nearby concession stand into a park house to store maintenance tools.

Two years later, both the pavilion and the old concession stand were torn down. The materials from the two structures were used to build a combination comfort station and park house on the site of the original pavilion in 1910.

It is probable that the 1910 structure burned down and was replaced by a new octagonal comfort station and park house, the same structure that stands in the park today.

== Chimborazo Fountain ==
In the center of the park sits a vacant circle where an iron fountain once stood. Drawing water from a spring beneath the park, the Chimborazo Fountain was built in the middle of the park's central circle in 1909. The fountain was wired for electric lighting, and at night colored lights shone from underneath the flowing water. This lighting required the City Engineer to install a series of electrical poles running through the center of the park, significantly detracting from the fountain's grandeur.

In 1910, recognizing this severe design flaw, engineers dismantled the fountain and placed the wires underground. The city also added a handsome iron fence and a concrete walkway surrounding the fountain. The colorful lights of the fountain captivated visitors and neighborhood residents through the first half of the twentieth century.

By 1956, however, the fountain was shrouded in a thick coat of rust and its wiring had deteriorated beyond repair. The fountain was finally removed from Chimborazo Park, leaving the park's central circle vacant.

== Map ==
Chimborazo Park A. Chimborazo Medical Museum B. Location of Old Chimborazo Fountain C. Statue of Liberty D. Powhatan Stone E. Marker Commemorating Chimborazo Hospital F. Chimborazo Round House
