= WLEE (1480 AM) =

- Richmond, Virginia; United States
- Frequency: 1480 kHz

Ownership
- Owner: Gilcom Corporation of Virginia

History
- First air date: October 1, 1945
- Last air date: December 31, 1988
- Former frequencies: 1450 kHz (1945–1950)
- Call sign meaning: For Robert E. Lee

Technical information
- Facility ID: 65650
- Power: 5,000 watts (day); 250 watts (night)
- Transmitter coordinates: 37.59720°N 77.51034°W

WLEE (1480 AM) was a radio station in Richmond, Virginia, United States. Last owned by Gilcom Corporation of Virginia, the station broadcast an adult standards format before closing. It broadcast from October 1, 1945, to December 31, 1988. The frequency was shared with WBBL, which primarily served to broadcast the services of Grace Covenant Presbyterian Church; for its entire history, WBBL programs were broadcast on WLEE's transmitter.

Established by Thomas Garland Tinsley, the station emerged as one of Richmond's most popular radio stations and as its leading Top 40 station from the 1960s through the mid-1970s. However, as music listening shifted to the FM band, its audience fell, and by the time it was closed, it had not made money in a decade. Delays in approval for a reconfigured transmitter setup at its site off Broad Street in Richmond caused a potential buyer to walk away and led to the decision to shut it down.

== Early years ==
In June 1944, two complementary applications were filed at the Federal Communications Commission (FCC). One was by Thomas Garland Tinsley, Jr., a Richmond native who had been working for station WITH in Baltimore seeking to build a new radio station at 1240 kHz. The other was by Grace Covenant, owner of WBBL, which sought to reduce its allotted hours to 11 a.m. to 12:15 p.m. and 8 to 9 p.m. on Sundays if the new station license were awarded. Tinsley had arranged a 10-year lease for WBBL's equipment. The applications were granted by the FCC on December 19, 1944, but for 1450 kHz with 250 watts.

While Tinsley had initially been denied permission to erect a 206-foot (63 m) transmission tower on Colorado Avenue, this was later approved. So, too, was a network affiliation; the new WLEE would debut as an affiliate of the Mutual Broadcasting System, replacing WRNL (910 AM) in the network. It also affiliated with the Associated Broadcasting Corporation, a new network that had gone into service in September 1945. (The Associated network became known as the Associated Broadcasting System in December 1945 as a result of an out-of-court settlement with the American Broadcasting Company.) Tinsley selected the call letters to give the station a "Southern sound"; the early studio featured a portrait of Robert E. Lee.

WLEE began broadcasting on October 1, 1945, with a dedication ceremony at the Mosque Auditorium. Studios were in the Broad-Grace Arcade downtown. WBBL also began to radiate from the new transmission facility.

Tinsley also expanded into television in 1955 when he started WXEX-TV in nearby Petersburg. WXEX-TV secured NBC affiliation, and so too did WLEE, bringing its programming back to local radio after it cut ties with WMBG and WTVR in the run-up to the television station's launch. From 1948 to 1957, WLEE also simulcast on the FM band at 102.9 MHz.

== Rock and roll years ==
In 1958, Pat Cohen, the owner of a chain of record stores, suggested to longtime WLEE general manager Harvey Hudson that he start playing rock and roll music due to its popularity. Hudson agreed, and the station and popular personalities soon began a ratings rise. The popular music; personalities such as Hudson and Lud Sterling; a healthy dose of stunts and promotions; a large local news team; and a nighttime rhythm and blues show, Music After Hours, helped fuel the station's rise in the radio ratings to top even longtime juggernaut WRVA. It was the first station in Richmond to play either rhythm and blues or the Beatles. In addition to the station's recognized local personalities, one went on to a career outside of radio broadcasting. Wrestling promoter and announcer Rich Landrum also worked at WLEE, lying about his age to start at the age of 15.

In 1967, Tinsley sold WLEE and WXEX-TV to Nationwide Communications for $7.15 million. Nationwide initially pursued moving WXEX-TV's main studio from Petersburg to the WLEE studio site, but this was met with criticism from civic officials in the Petersburg area and shelved. In 1959, WLEE dropped NBC to return to Mutual.

== Twilight years ==
The rise of FM exacted a toll on what was one of the market's leading stations, one that WLEE general manager Hudson disregarded when a new hit radio station, WRVQ (94.5 FM), launched in 1972. In a profile on radio competition in the weekly Richmond Mercury, he was quoted as saying, "Stereo? What's stereo? Most people don't turn the volume up loud enough to hear the difference between AM and FM stereo." In 1975, the station posted a total market rating of 11.5, far behind WRVA and just edged out by easy listening station WEZS; that figure had slipped to a 4.5 by the end of the decade, while WRVQ rose to second. The station subtly shifted its music mix up in age to an adult contemporary format and began calling itself "Richmond Radio".

At the start of 1982, WLEE converted from a contemporary format to the syndicated Music of Your Life oldies format. In November 1983, the FCC approved the sale of WLEE from Nationwide to the Gilcom Corporation of Virginia for $950,000. The head of Gilcom, Edward T. Giller, owned stations in Pennsylvania and West Virginia. Hudson, who would also serve as a founding owner of TVX Broadcast Group, returned to do a morning show for the standards-formatted station from 1984 to 1987.

== End of operations ==
On December 29, 1988, Gilcom announced it would shut the station down on December 31 of that year and surrender the license to the FCC. While the station had not made money for a decade, the proximate cause was the failure of a plan to improve WLEE's nighttime broadcast facility. In 1984, Gilcom sold half of the transmitter site property to be developed into a new Courtyard by Marriott hotel. The hotel property occupied land on which two of the four towers in the array sat. Studios were moved to a site on Deep Rock Road. In late 1985, Gilcom had filed to build two new towers at 6200 West Broad Street, but it was forced to redo the plan for a three-tower array. The three-tower radiation pattern only covered 70 percent of the area, prompting the commission to withhold approval. The delay in obtaining FCC approval for a construction permit caused a potential buyer to walk away from the station, and even though the permit came in November 1988, it was too late to save the station.

Because WBBL was dependent on WLEE's facilities to broadcast, Grace Covenant found itself in the position of holding a license without a transmission facility. For the first two Sundays of 1989, WBBL turned on WLEE's transmitter two more times to air services; it then began to rent time from WTVR (the former WMBG) and other stations. WBBL never returned to the air and was deleted on March 14, 1994, marking the definitive end of the oldest station in Richmond and the second-oldest in Virginia.

== Reuse of the WLEE call sign in Richmond ==
The WLEE call letters were not gone for long in Richmond. At 1320 kHz, WANI, which had gone off the air earlier in 1988, was resurrected as a "new" WLEE on February 1, 1989, with Gilcom relinquishing the call letters and studio facilities to the new venture while burying the 1480 frequency with the call sign WJRW. The first incarnation of WLEE at 1320 lasted just three months due to financial problems, but after being sold, the call letters and standards format returned in September. From 1995 to 1997, WLEE-FM (now WKLR) operated at 96.5 MHz as part of a local marketing agreement between WLEE and the FM station's owner, airing a 1970s-based classic hits format.

The call letters moved from 1320 (now WBTL) to 990 kHz in 1999 in a swap with WVNZ, previously used on 990. That station became WREJ in 2016 after being sold and changing formats.

The 1480 frequency would be recycled 15 years later for a new station, WTOX.
