= WVNZ =

WVNZ may refer to:

- WVNZ (AM), a radio station (1450 AM) licensed to serve Highland Springs, Virginia, United States
- WBTL (AM), a radio station (1320 AM) licensed to serve Richmond, Virginia, which held the call sign WVNZ from 1999 to 2023
- WJFN-FM, a radio station (100.5 FM) licensed to serve Goochland, Virginia, which held the call sign WVNZ-FM in 2018
