= WULT =

Radio station in Sandston, Virginia

- Sandston, Virginia; United States
- Broadcast area: Metro Richmond
- Frequency: 1540 kHz
- Branding: Ultra Richmond

Programming
- Language: Spanish
- Format: Contemporary hit radio

Ownership
- Owner: Mike Mazursky; (Mobile Radio Partners, Inc.)
- Sister stations: WBTL; WTOX; WVNZ

History
- First air date: 1964 (as WRGM)
- Former call signs: WWWW (1964); WRGM (1964–1977); WKIE (1977–1990); WRBN (1990–1993); WREJ (1993–2016); WLEE (2016); WONA (2016–2017); WBTL (2017–2018); WULT (2018); WBTL (2018–2023)
- Call sign meaning: Ultra

Technical information
- Licensing authority: FCC
- Facility ID: 21434
- Class: D
- Power: 1,000 watts day; 8 watts night
- Transmitter coordinates: 37°32′39.5″N 77°20′45.9″W
- Translator: 94.1 W231DP (Richmond)
- Repeaters: 1320 WBTL (Ashland); 1450 WVNZ (Highland Springs); 1480 WTOX (Bensley)

Links
- Public license information: Public file; LMS
- Website: ultraradiorichmond.com

WULT (1540 AM) is a Spanish CHR formatted broadcast radio station licensed to Sandston, Virginia and serving the Richmond, Virginia area. WULT is owned and operated by Mike Mazursky, through licensee Mobile Radio Partners, Inc.

== History ==
On November 9, 2015, the then-WREJ went silent. Its previous black gospel format moved to sister station WLEE (990 AM), replacing news/talk. On February 4, 2016, WREJ swapped call signs with its sister station, assuming the WLEE call sign. The station changed its call sign to WONA on March 15, 2016. Effective June 28, 2016, Davidson Media Group donated WONA to the Delmarva Educational Association.

On October 31, 2017, Mobile Radio Partners, Inc. finalized the purchase of WONA from Delmarva Educational Association, at a price of $25,000. They changed the station's call sign to WBTL on the same day. On November 6, 2017, WBTL returned to the air with rhythmic oldies, branded as "U Win Radio" and simulcasting with WUWN (1450 AM). On March 14, 2018, WBTL and WUWN changed formats to oldies, branded as "Boomtown Radio".

WBTL changed its call sign to WULT on August 27, 2018. The station also moved its community of license from Richmond to Sandston. WULT switched to Spanish music as Ultra Richmond on the same day, breaking the simulcast with WUWN. WUWN picked up the WBTL call sign and continued to run the hybrid oldies format as Boomtown Richmond.

Former logo
