= Chimborazo Hospital =

American Civil War hospital in Virginia for the Confederate Army

- U.S. Historic district – Contributing property
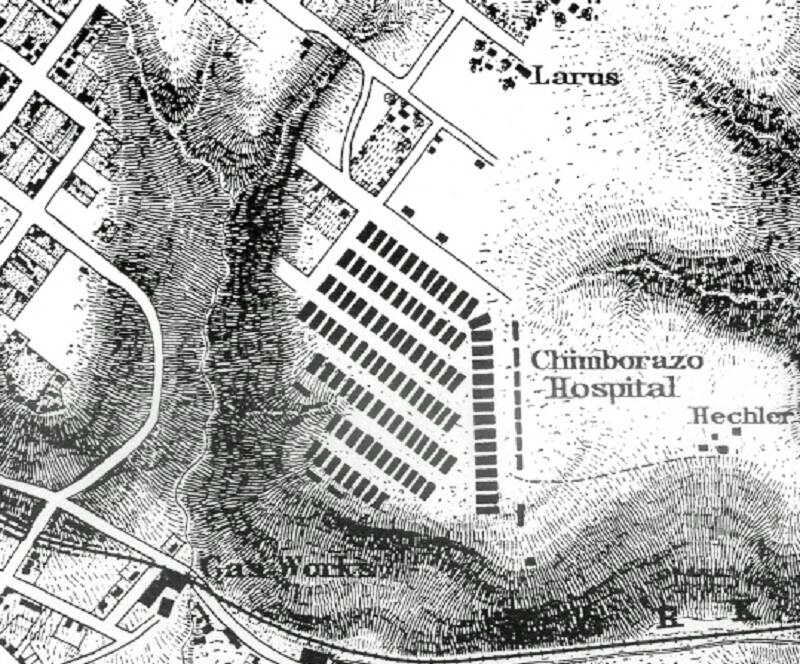
- Inset of an 1865 map showing Chimborazo Hospital. To the south (bottom) are the tracks of the Richmond and York Railroad

- Location within Virginia Location within the United States
- Location: Richmond, Virginia
- Coordinates: 37°25′45″N 77°22′25″W
- Built: 1862
- Part of: Oakwood–Chimborazo Historic District (ID04001372)
- Added to NRHP: March 18, 2005

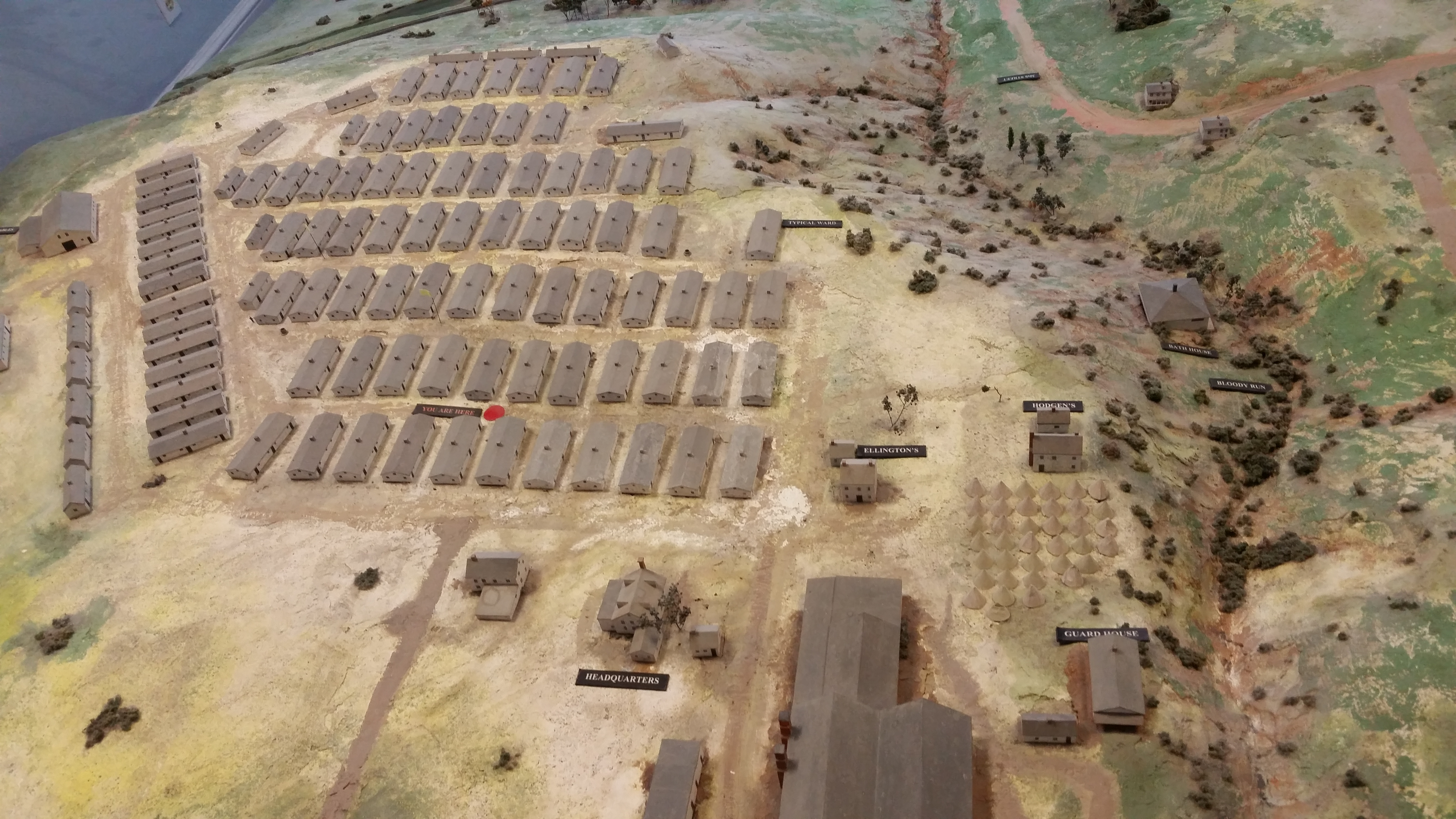
US National Park Service model of the Chimborazo Hospital grounds during the Civil War

Chimborazo Hospital was a Civil War-era facility built in Richmond, Virginia to service the medical needs of the Confederate Army. It functioned between 1862 and 1865 in what is now Chimborazo Park, treating over 76,000 injured Confederate soldiers. During its existence, the hospital admitted nearly 78,000 patients and between 6,500 and 8,000 of these patients died. This mortality rate of between 8.3 and 10.3 percent is among the lowest such rates of period military hospitals.

After the war, the Hospital became a refuge for freed slaves.

== Establishment ==
In the early days of the Civil War, most people did not expect the conflict to last more than a few months, so the Confederate government failed to immediately establish many kinds of necessary military infrastructure, including medical infrastructure. Many soldiers were sent to civilian houses to receive medical care, resulting in both unsatisfactory care and the illness of many caretakers. Most Richmond-area military hospitals were not purpose-built buildings, but rather repurposed existing structures, including warehouses, hotels, homes, and stores. These facilities quickly became overcrowded, and Samuel P. Moore, the new surgeon general of the Confederacy, needed to quickly identify new potential hospital sites.

Simultaneously and coincidentally, on an undeveloped plateau on the east end of Richmond called Chimborazo Hill, slaves began building a permanent winter quarters, including soldiers’ barracks, officers’ quarters, three hospitals, and a bake house. Since most Confederate soldiers would be wintering further north, Moore decided to convert the barracks into a hospital, appointing Dr. James B. McCaw, a professor at the Medical College of Virginia, as surgeon-in-chief.

The name Chimborazo is said to have been inspired by the volcanic mountain Chimborazo, in Ecuador.

== Facilities and operation ==
Record keeping at Chimborazo Hospital was meticulous. There were ninety hospital wards, which all had shingled roofs, wood-plank floors, and whitewashed walls (interior and exterior). Each side of each building had three doors and ten windows; each window had a white curtain. Each ward was warmed by a wood stove and lit at night by a single candle. Each ward measured eighty by twenty feet and contained approximately forty beds. In addition to hospital wards, there were also bake houses, kitchens, ice houses, a soap house, a stable, a guard house, a chapel, a bathhouse, carpenter, blacksmith and apothecary shops, and five dead houses. Each building was surrounded by wide avenues, as McCaw believed fresh air was a medical necessity for recovery.

McCaw established a strict formal organizational structure, including divisional hospitals, surgeons, assistant surgeons, acting assistant surgeons, stewards, ward masters, nurses, druggists, cooks, dentists, and matrons. All surgeons were required to have at least five years of medical experience. Other positions were filled by soldiers, free blacks, slaves, and white women. For most of the war, even when the wounded from the nearby Seven Days Battles required tents to accommodate overflow, food was sufficient and medical care received praise. However, as occurred at all hospitals of the day, available resources were not always sufficient and sometimes organizational structures broke down, leading to insufficient care and an unsanitary environment. Soldiers who died at Chimborazo were buried at Oakwood Cemetery.

== After the war ==
As news arrived of Robert E. Lee's retreat from the Siege of Petersburg on April 2, 1865, patients began to leave voluntarily or be evacuated. McCaw surrendered the hospital the following day. Some Confederate wounded remained as the Union began to bring their own wounded into the hospital; Union and Confederate soldiers resided in separate wards. By early summer, all patients had been removed.

Shortly after the buildings were vacated by the military, freed slaves began to occupy the site. While the 13th Amendment had freed all slaves in the United States, it had not provided work nor land nor housing for them. The Freedmen's Bureau, formally known as the Bureau of Refugees, Freedmen and Abandoned Lands, had been established to provide such necessities to freed slaves, but the bureau was limited in its successes due to insufficient resources, diverse and complex responsibilities, Presidential obstruction of bills to expand the bureau, and Black Codes restricting black movement, labor, and rights. The refugees remained segregated from society.

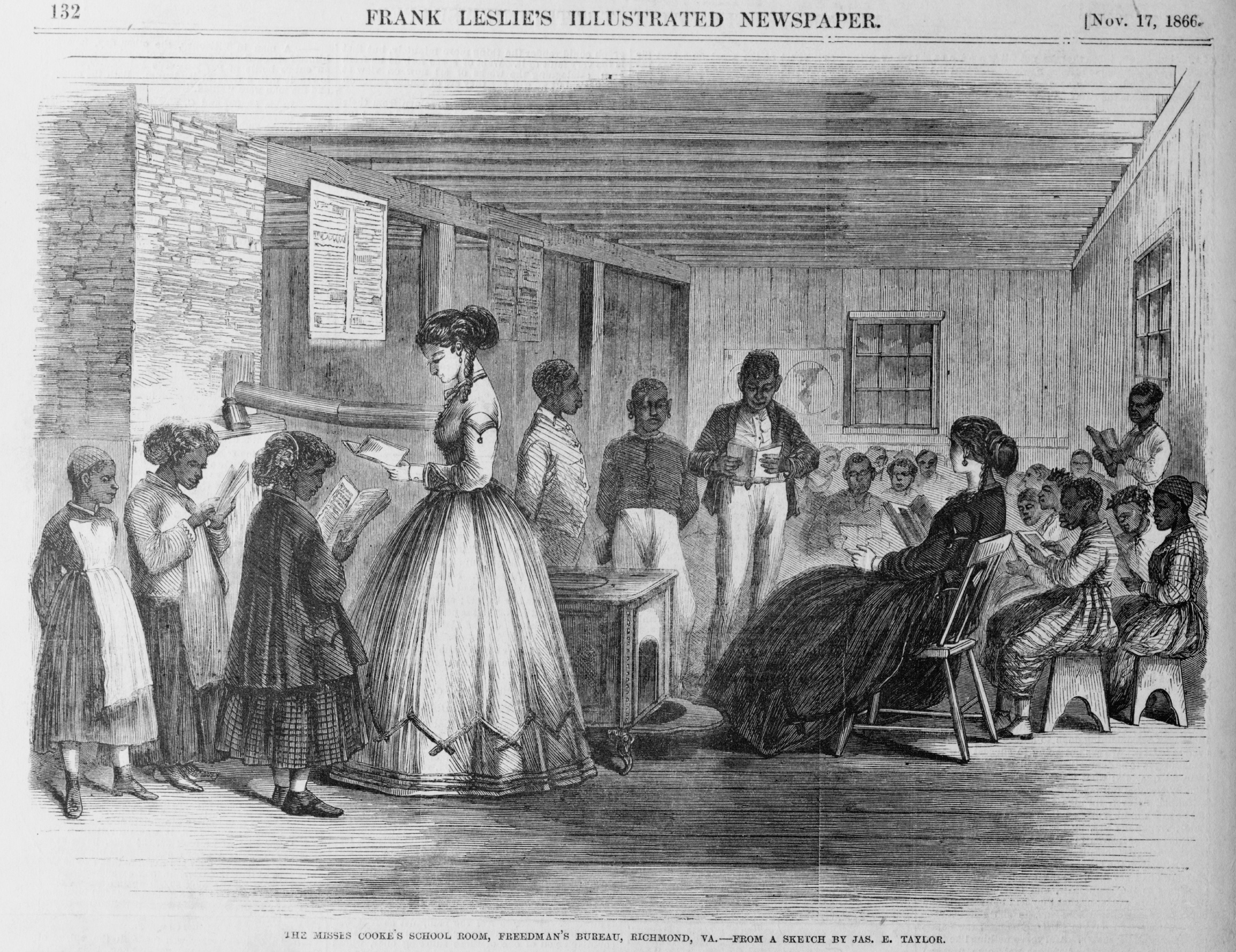
Misses Cooke's school for freedmen, former Chimborazo Hospital

The Chimborazo refugee camp, referred to as the "Nation's poorest of the poor," proved a major logistical challenge for the Richmond city government, particularly because the camp's white neighbors often complained about the camp and sometimes incited riots. Chimborazo was just outside of Richmond city limits and thus offered little protection from their neighbors, leading to the formation of a militia (Richmond soon expanded its city limits to encompass Chimborazo). The major violent incidents came in March 1866, which were initially characterized by local media sources depicting the conflicts as "Negros" terrorizing defenseless white people. However, it was later realized that white men had been harassing and threatening the community, leading to several arrests, though all but one were released.

In response to the riots, the Freedmen's Bureau ordered that all able-bodied men vacate the camp by April 1, 1866. It was expected that roughly 150 individuals would remain of the 1,000 present on the site. However, by 1870, voter registration data shows that 651 black voters were present in the Marshall Ward which includes Chimborazo and Church Hill. Considering women and children would not be counted in this data, the number is likely significantly higher.

The City of Richmond gradually began buying up the land of Chimborazo, gradually removing all of the structures and beginning work on Chimborazo Park.

Today, the land of Chimborazo Park is owned by both the City of Richmond (27.9 acres) and the federal government (5.6 acres).The park contains several monuments, including a smaller version of the Statue of Liberty and one commemorating the relationship of Powhatan and John Smith, and a museum and visitor center, the headquarters of Richmond National Battlefield Park, which is primarily focused on Civil War-era battlefield medicine. The surrounding neighborhood has been nationally designated as Oakwood-Chimborazo Historic District.

== See also ==
- Richmond National Battlefield Park
- Oakwood Cemetery (Richmond, Virginia)

== Bibliography ==
- Brock, R. A., and Alexander G. Lane. Confederate States of America Hospitals Collection. Collection and Papers of R.A. Brock. 1861. Letters and documents pertaining to personnel (letters of recommendation, agreements, returns), and patients (reports and lists, discharge papers, request for physical examinations, medical certificates) of various Confederate hospitals. The bulk of the collection pertains to Winder Hospital, although there are some items relating to Chimborazo Hospital, a hospital for Negroes "engaged on work on Richmond Defense," Refuge Hill Hospital, Robertson Hospital, and Williamsburg Seminary Hospital. Many letters are addressed to Dr. Alexander G. Lane, Surgeon-in-charge of the Winder hospital.
- Curnutt RC. 1975. "Hill of Mercy: Chimborazo Military Hospital, 1861-1865". The Journal of the Oklahoma State Medical Association. 68, no. 4: 113-9.
- Gildersleeve, John R. "History of Chimborazo General Hospital, Richmond, Va. and its medical officers during 1861-1865." Virginia Medical Monthly, vol. 88, no. 10, pages 573-620.
- Green, Carol C., "Chimborazo: The Confederacy's Largest Hospital." University of Tennessee Press, 2004. ISBN 1572333162. The book includes chapters on the organization of the Confederate Medical Dept and Chimborazo Hospital, the Surgeons, the Staff, the Patients, Supplies, Medical Treatment, the Closing, and an Evaluation of the hospital's significance.
- Habersham, S. E. Observations Upon the Statistics of Chimborazo Hospital, with Some Remarks Upon the Treatment of Various Diseases During the Recent Civil War. Nashville, Tenn: University Book and job Office, medical college, 1866.
- Habersham, S. E. Remarks Upon Compound Fractures of the Thigh, from Gun-Shots (Treated at Chimborazo Hospital, Richmond, Va.). Nashville, Tenn: University Medical Press-W.H.F. Ligon, Printer, 1867. "[Reprinted] from the Nashville Journal of Medicine and Surgery."
- Irby, Gloria R. Chimborazo and Lincoln Hospitals. 1967. OCLC Number: 9563956.
- Johns, Frank Stoddard, and Anne Page Johns. "Chimborazo Hospital and J.B. McCaw, Surgeon-in-Chief." 1954. Offprint from: The Virginia Magazine of history and biography, vol. 62, no. 2, April 1954."
- Pember, Phoebe Yates. 1974. A Southern Woman's Story: Life in Confederate Richmond. (editor B.I. Wiley). Mockingbird Books. ISBN 0345238656 - (Mrs. Pember, a chief matron of one of the hospital divisions at Chimborazo, wrote this memoir between 1865 and 1879.)
- Pember, Phoebe Yates. Phoebe Yates Pember Letters. 1861. The collection includes letters to relatives and friends from Pember, including seven letters written while she was a nurse at Chimborazo Hospital, Richmond, Va., 1861-1865; and items of later years, mainly 1895-1900, containing comments on current political events, social and economic conditions, personal finances and living arrangements, her reading, religion, visitors, relatives, and daily life in Mendham, N.J., Savannah, Ga., and elsewhere. Many letters from the period 1895-1899 were written during European travels and describe accommodations, prices, health, acquaintances, and American expatriates in Germany, Italy, and Switzerland. In the Southern Historical Collection, University of North Carolina at Chapel Hill (#2232-z).
- Richmond National Battlefield Park (Va.). Chimborazo. Richmond, Va: [s.n.], 1976.
- Shortt, Katherine Blevins. Chimborazo Hospital: "A House of Charnal Living Sufferers", or Forty Acres of Miraculous Healing. Capstone Seminar Paper—Emory & Henry College, 2006, 2006.
- Smith, S. "Map of Chimborazo General Hospital, C.S.A., as it appeared July 6, 1862." Virginia medical monthly, v. 88, no. 10 (Oct. 1961).
