= Rich Landrum =

American radio and television broadcaster (1946–2023)

Richard Eugene Landrum (March 31, 1946 – August 14, 2023) was an American radio and television broadcaster, who was best known for hosting the syndicated program World Wide Wrestling from late 1978 to early 1982. He started his broadcasting career at the age of 16, while attending Douglas S. Freeman High School in western Henrico County (a Richmond suburb).

== Career ==
=== Broadcasting ===
Landrum started his broadcasting career at the age of 16 while still in high school, working part-time as a news reporter for radio station WLEE in Richmond under the mentorship of its vice-president and general manager Harvey Hudson. At that time WLEE was the #1 Top 40 station in Richmond. Landrum stayed with WLEE for four years and moved to WTVR AM, another Richmond radio station. That lasted about a year and he returned to WLEE. During his time with WLEE, Landrum worked with a number of Richmond broadcasters, including Harvey Hudson, Lud Sterling, Jess Duboy, Jim Granger, George Prescott and Bill Adams (the former producer of the Dick Clark Radio Show).

While assistant manager for a Little League Baseball team with Neil Kuvin, the station manager for co-owned WXEX-TV in Petersburg, Kuvin convinced Landrum to move to WXEX-TV. At first, Landrum was not sure he wanted to move to TV, as he really enjoyed the anonymity of radio. Kuvin finally convinced him and Landrum started his TV career as a field reporter and news photographer. Shortly thereafter, in addition to being a field reporter, he hosted the afternoon version of Dialing for Dollars and filled in as a sports presenter on the 6:00 & 11:00 news, when needed.

=== Professional wrestling ===
During this time, at the behest of one of his friends, he attended a local professional wrestling match at the State Fair Grounds of Virginia at Strawberry Hill (now Richmond International Raceway). Shortly before the matches were to start, Joe Murnick, the local promoter, approached him. Murnick explained that the announcer from WTVR-TV, who usually did the ring announcing had not shown up, and asked if Lundrum would be interested in filling in for a small payment. Landrum agreed, and after the show was over he was hired as their regular weekly ring announcer.

In 1972, Landrum left WXEX-TV, as he was uncertain that he wanted to continue his broadcast career. He entered the automobile business, but still maintained his ties with wrestling as a ring announcer. In 1977, after local wrestling had moved permanently to the Richmond Coliseum, he was approached by George Scott, who was then the booker for Jim Crockett Promotions (JCP) of Charlotte, North Carolina. JCP promoted wrestling throughout the mid-Atlantic states and produced two syndicated professional wrestling TV shows (Mid-Atlantic Championship Wrestling and World Wide Wrestling). Scott said that they wanted Landrum to audition as a promo announcer for their two TV shows and asked him to come to Raleigh, the following week, when they taped the promos and shows at WRAL-TV. Landrum showed up and later said, "It was the longest and hardest afternoon" he had ever had in broadcasting. Nevertheless, he was given the job and his broadcasting career in professional wrestling started in earnest.

In 1978, Landrum took over the commentary for the revamped World Wide Wrestling (formerly Wide World Wrestling). Johnny Weaver, who provided the color commentary, later joined him. Weaver was a well-known wrestler in the JCP stable. Landrum dubbed him “The Dean of Professional Wrestling” on the opening of their show one night, and that nickname stuck for the rest of Weaver’s career. Not to be outdone, Weaver started calling Landrum “The Voice”. It has often been reported that of all the announcer teams of that era, Weaver and Landrum are the most remembered for their smooth approach, their interaction with one another and their respect for their contemporaries.

In 1982, after Crockett moved its TV taping operation to WPCQ in Charlotte, North Carolina, Landrum was let go in a cost-cutting measure. In 1983, he was approached by George Scott, who was then booking for the World Wrestling Federation (WWF). Scott explained that they were looking for a third announcer. Landrum did not take much convincing, and he went to Baltimore, Maryland for an audition. He stayed with the WWF for about a year. After the WWF there was a short spell with the International Championship Wrestling hosting their TV shows from Boston.

=== Legal issues ===
A jury convicted Landrum in June 1987 of (1) making and possessing an unregistered bomb, in violation of 26 U.S.C. §§ 5861(c), (d), (f), 5871, and (2) intercepting and disclosing the contents of wire communications, in violation of 18 U.S.C. § 2511(1)(a), (c). The conduct for which Landrum was convicted occurred during 1985 and 1986. Landrum wiretapped his ex-wife's phone and placed a bomb in the car of a man she was dating. Landrum was sentenced on September 17, 1987, and, as part of his sentence, the district court ordered him to pay restitution to several of his victims, including $1,432 to his ex-wife, Linda Landrum, and $5,483 to her insurer, Blue Cross/Blue Shield of Virginia, for the costs of Ms. Landrum's psychological counseling.

=== Hearth business ===
In 1998, Landrum switched gears entirely and entered the retail hardware business working for a local True Value Hardware in the Tri-Cities area. It was here that he started the hearth business (gas logs, fireplaces, gas log stoves, etc.) for the owner. The owner retired in 2000 and turned the hearth business over to Landrum.

In May 2000, Landrum founded American Hearth and Home and has been the owner ever since. However, he has never lost touch with professional wrestling, as he made personal appearances at wrestling shows and fanfests throughout Virginia and the Carolinas. "I love meeting and seeing the fans. They call me a ‘legend’, but I’m not sure I qualify for that," Landrum said.

== Death ==
Rich Landrum died on August 14, 2023, at the age of 77.

== See also ==
Jim Crockett Promotions
