= WBBL (AM) =

- Richmond, Virginia; United States
- Frequency: 1480 kHz

Programming
- Format: Christian radio

Ownership
- Owner: Grace Covenant Presbyterian Church

History
- First air date: January 27, 1924
- Last air date: January 8, 1989
- Former frequencies: 1060 kHz (1924); 1310 kHz (1924–1927); 1210 kHz (1927); 1280 kHz (1927–1928); 1370 kHz (1928–1930); 1210 kHz (1930–1941); 1240 kHz (1941–1945); 1450 kHz (1945–1950)

Technical information
- Facility ID: 24717
- Power: 5,000 watts (day); 250 watts (night)
- Transmitter coordinates: 37.59720°N 77.51034°W

WBBL was a radio station in Richmond, Virginia, United States, which broadcast from 1924 until 1989, although the silenced station was not formally deleted until 1994. For its entire existence, it was owned by the Grace Covenant Presbyterian Church. WBBL was Richmond's oldest radio station and the second-oldest station in Virginia. The station operated part-time throughout its existence, broadcasting the church's Sunday daytime services plus Sunday night programming.

Beginning in 1945, WBBL shared time with, and used the transmitter of, WLEE, which began operating on 1450 kHz that year and moved to 1480 kHz in 1950. From 1945 to 1989, WBBL's schedule totaled two hours and 15 minutes per week. WLEE was shut down for economic reasons at the end of 1988, taking WBBL off the air with it following two final church service broadcasts made in January 1989. After WBBL's silencing, Grace Covenant arranged to have its services carried by other local stations.

== History ==
=== Establishment ===
In late January 1924, the Reverend R. A. Torrey was slated to speak at Grace Covenant. The church was concerned that demand would surpass the 600-seat capacity of its sanctuary and so conceived of the idea of using the new method of carrying the speech over a radio station to expand the audience. The United States Department of Commerce, headquartered in Washington, D.C., regulated radio at this time. The church was initially authorized to establish WBBL in January 1924, with a power of 10 watts at 1060 kHz. The call sign was randomly assigned from a sequential roster of available call signs, coming between WBBK in Pittsburgh and WBBM in Lincoln, Illinois.

WBBL made its formal debut with Torrey's speech, which contemporary accounts state took place on either January 27 or 30. (Note: Most historical accounts give January 27 as the date, but a February 1, 1924, article in the Richmond Times-Dispatch says WBBL began broadcasting on January 30.) The station was upgraded to 100 watts that September. During its early months of operation, WBBL was Richmond's only radio station, so it also broadcast several non-church programs as well as a weekly Tuesday night program. On multiple occasions, it broadcast election returns in partnership with the Richmond Times-Dispatch. It partnered with Richmond's other major newspaper, the News Leader, to air college football and other sports events. These broadcasts were slowly curtailed after 1925, when WRVA began broadcasting; WBBL sometimes did not broadcast to allow more exposure for WRVA's public service programming. What had once been makeshift studios on the third floor were reconditioned in early 1927.

Following the establishment of the Federal Radio Commission (FRC), stations were initially issued a series of temporary authorizations starting on May 3, 1927. A series of nationwide reorganizations resulted in three frequency changes in two years. WBBL was moved from 1310 kHz to 1210 kHz on June 1, then to 1280 kHz in November 1927.

Stations were informed that if they wanted to continue operating, they needed to file a formal license application by January 15, 1928, as the first step in determining whether they met the new "public interest, convenience, or necessity" standard. On May 25, 1928, the FRC issued General Order 32, which notified 164 stations, including WBBL, that "From an examination of your application for future license it does not find that public interest, convenience, or necessity would be served by granting it." Hearings were held in mid-July, and WBBL survived this review, with chairman Ira E. Robinson stating satisfaction.

After being relicensed, WBBL was moved to 1370 kHz on November 11, 1928, as part of the FRC's major reallocation produced by implementation of its General Order 40. On June 6, 1930, the FRC granted a petition for the other Richmond station that had faced a General Order 32 review, WMBG, to go to unlimited time six days a week by sharing 1210 kHz with WBBL on Sundays. WBBL was given the hours of 10:30 a.m. to 1:30 p.m., 5:30 to 7 p.m., and 7:30 to 9:30 p.m. The time-sharing agreement with WMBG continued until that station was approved to move to 1350 kHz in January 1937. WBBL continued to broadcast on Sundays at 1210, moving to 1240 kHz along with most of the other stations on its frequency with the implementation of the North American Regional Broadcasting Agreement in March 1941.

=== Sharing time with WLEE ===
In June 1944, two complementary applications were filed at the Federal Communications Commission (FCC), which had replaced the FRC a decade earlier. One was by Thomas Garland Tinsley Jr., seeking to build a new radio station at 1240 kHz. The other was by Grace Covenant, which sought to reduce its allotted hours to 11 a.m. to 12:15 p.m. and 8 to 9 p.m. on Sundays if the new station license were awarded. Tinsley had arranged a 10-year lease for WBBL's equipment. The applications were granted by the FCC on December 19, 1944, but for 1450 kHz with 250 watts. WLEE began broadcasting on October 1, 1945, and after more than 20 years, transmission of WBBL shifted from the church on Monument Avenue to the commercial outlet's site on Colorado Avenue.

In 1949, WLEE was approved to change frequencies to 1480 kHz and upgrade to 5,000 watts from a new transmitter site on Broad Street, and the FCC also permitted WBBL to make the change alongside it in August 1950, when both stations made their last frequency change.

With just two hours and 15 minutes of allotted airtime per week, WBBL's schedule consisted of its Sunday 11 a.m. church service plus the Presbyterian Radio Hour, produced at one time by longtime Richmond radio man Alden Aaroe. As WLEE became Richmond's number-one Top 40 station, the church opted to focus its night hour on outreach to WLEE's younger audience. The result was a program called Showcase and later Celebration Rock, hosted by Jeff Kellam and spotlighting Christian rock music. This program ultimately became nationally syndicated. As music audiences shifted to FM and WLEE reoriented toward older listeners, and because Celebration Rock already was being carried on an FM station, it was replaced with an offering known as Flight 1480 and then Alternatives, a magazine program with a call-in format.

=== End of operations ===
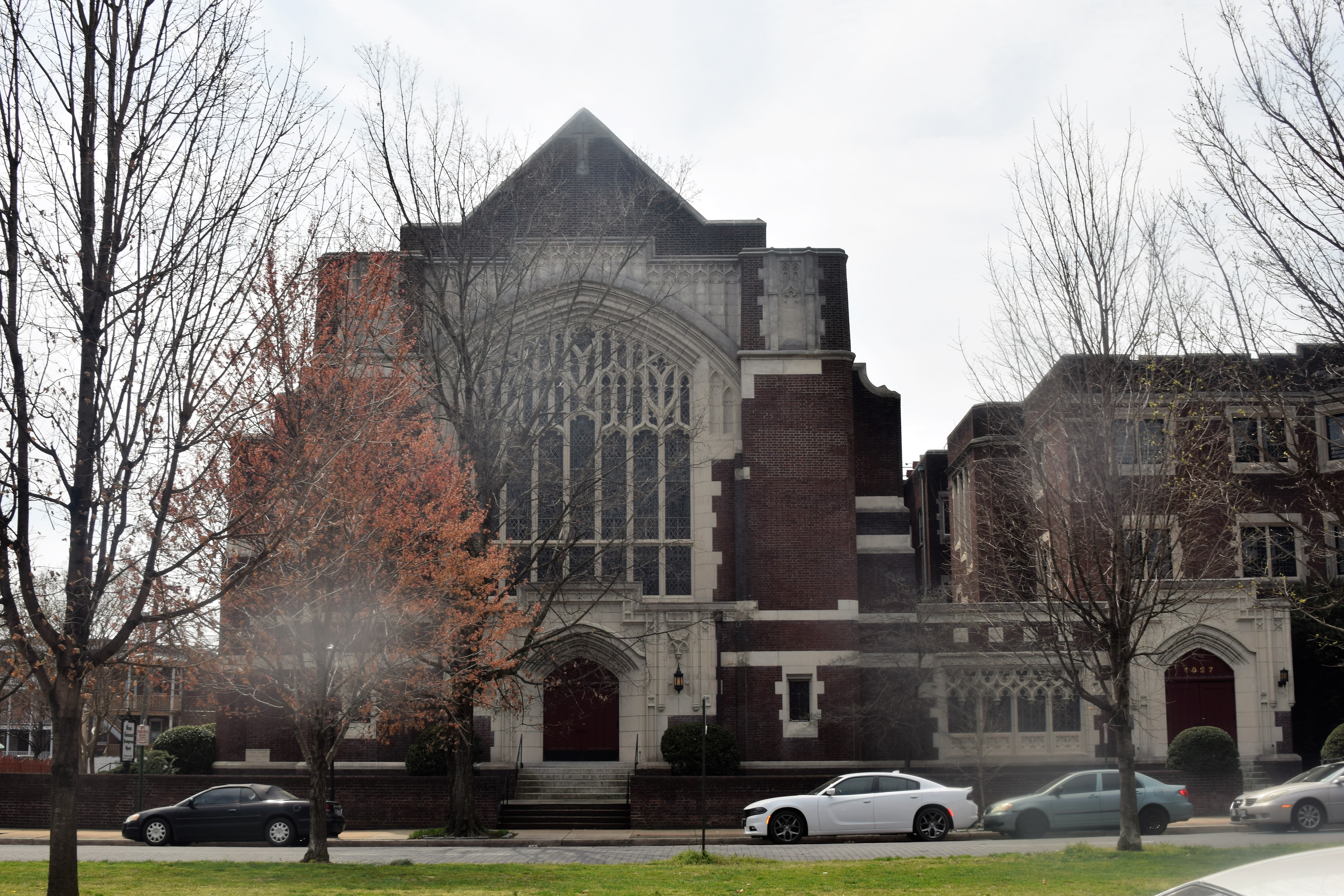
Grace Covenant Presbyterian Church in Richmond

The Gilcom Corporation of Virginia took over ownership of WLEE in October 1984. That year, the new owners sold part of the station's transmitter site to be developed into a new Courtyard by Marriott hotel, with the hotel property occupying land on which two of the four towers in the array sat. In late 1985, Gilcom filed to build two new towers at 6200 West Broad Street, later needing to modify this plan to specify a three-tower array. However, the three-tower proposal only covered 70 percent of the area, prompting the commission to initially withhold approval. The delay in obtaining FCC approval caused a potential station sale to be cancelled, and even though the permit was approved in November 1988, it was too late to save the station. On December 29, 1988, Gilcom announced that due to the failure of the various plans to improve the station's nighttime facility, WLEE—which had not made money for a decade—would be shut down at the end of the year.

Because WBBL needed WLEE's facilities in order to broadcast, the church found itself holding a license without a way to get on the air. For the first two Sundays of 1989, WBBL turned on WLEE's transmitter to air services, after which it switched to renting time from WTVR (1380 AM).

Shortly prior to its deletion, the call sign of the original WLEE was changed to WJRW and the historic WLEE call letters transferred to another local station, 1320 kHz. This new WLEE briefly broadcast from February to the start of May; Grace moved there, but the venture was saddled by financial difficulties and forced off the air.

Grace Covenant did not have a time-sharing agreement with the new WLEE, and its service broadcasts moved to WTVR-FM 98.1. Though plans were investigated for moving WBBL to another frequency or even full-time operation on 1480, no replacement plans were ever realized. The FCC marked WBBL's license as deleted in its system on March 14, 1994, formally ending the oldest station in Richmond and the second-oldest in Virginia.

Since the elimination of WBBL, Grace Covenant has continued to produce its services for air on other stations; in 2000, the church broadcast its 4,000th service. By 2020, services were airing on Christian station WLES (590 AM).
