= WTOX =

Simulcasts WULT, Sandston
- Bensley, Virginia; United States
- Broadcast area: Metro Richmond
- Frequency: 1480 kHz
- Branding: Ultra Richmond

Programming
- Format: Spanish CHR

Ownership
- Owner: Michael Mazursky; (Mobile Radio Partners, Inc.)
- Sister stations: WBTL; WULT; WVNZ

History
- First air date: 2004

Technical information
- Licensing authority: FCC
- Facility ID: 129524
- Class: D
- Power: 1,000 watts day; 10 watts night
- Transmitter coordinates: 37°40′56.5″N 77°33′49″W

Links
- Public license information: Public file; LMS
- Website: ultraradiorichmond.com

WTOX (1480 AM) is a Spanish language contemporary hit radio formatted broadcast radio station licensed to Bensley, Virginia, serving Metro Richmond. WTOX is owned and operated by Michael Mazursky, through licensee Mobile Radio Partners, Inc.

== Frequency history ==
1480 in the Richmond was originally used by WLEE, which had moved there from 1450 kHz in 1950 as part of a power increase. WLEE, which grew to be the main Top 40 radio station in Richmond in the 1960s and early 1970s, shared its time with an even older station, WBBL, which broadcast church services on Sunday. WLEE was shuttered December 31, 1988, for economic reasons, taking WBBL with it.

== Sale ==
On July 14, 2015 Davidson Media Group announced it would be selling WTOX and sister station WVNZ to TBLC Virginia Holdings, LLC. for $400,000. The sale was consummated on November 5, 2015.

In late 2018, Mobile Radio Partners assumed programming control, and put its Ultra Richmond format, already heard on WULT, on WTOX. Effective June 9, 2021, Mobile Radio Partners acquired WTOX, WVNZ, and a translator from TBLC Media for $209,500.

== 1480 The Line ==
On July 24, 2023, WTOX split from its simulcast with WULT and changed its format to sports gambling, branded as "1480 The Line".
