= Davidson Media Group =

The Davidson Media Group (DMG) is a Charlotte-based broadcaster specializing in multi-cultural, community focused formats. The company runs stations in a number of markets in 10 states and also specializes in selling large blocks of time on some of its stations to brokers who broadcast Spanish and/or urban contemporary gospel programs. Despite the minority-focus of DMG's market, the company itself is not minority-owned and is controlled through two private equity groups, CapStreet II LP and Citigroup Venture Capital.

Felix Perez was at one time DMG's president and chief executive officer; by January 2012, Perez had been named as the general manager for Univision Radio.

On February 13, 2009, SS Broadcasting Holdings (SSH) announced that it was purchasing Davidson Media Group for $1,000 cash and assumption of debt. This transaction placed SSH in control of 43 stations previously licensed to DMG.

== Organization ==
The structure of the Group was quite complicated and prone to change as properties are acquired and divested. For instance, an example from 2005 shows that Davidson Media Group has among subsidiaries Davidson Media Holding Corp. and Davidson Media Holding Sub Corp., which together own Davidson Media Carolinas Stations LLC, which in turn owns Davidson Media Station WOLI Licensee LLC, the former license holder of WOLI-FM of Easley, South Carolina.

== Stations ==
As of mid-2007, Davidson Media operated over 40 stations in 17 states.

- WCVG/1320 AM: Covington, Kentucky; acquired July 16, 2006 for $1.9 million and converted to a Spanish language station.

=== Former stations ===
Call sign	Frequency	Band	Broadcasting from	Acquired	Divested	Notes
KAKS	99.5	FM	Fayetteville, Arkansas			Had ownership as of 2009
KLBB	1400	AM	Minneapolis-St. Paul, Minnesota	2005		
KLBP	1470	AM	Brooklyn Park, Minnesota	2005		
WACM	1490	AM	West Springfield, Massachusetts		2015	
WEAC	1500	AM	Gaffney, South Carolina		2008	
WKKB	100.3	FM	Middletown, Rhode Island	2005	2015	
WNVL	1240	AM	Nashville, Tennessee	2006	2012	
WNSG-AM	880	AM	Nashville, Tennessee	2006		
WOLI-FM	103.9	FM	Easley, South Carolina	2005	2015	Changed call sign from "WOLI" to "WOLI-FM" upon acquisition.
WSPR	1270	AM	Springfield, Massachusetts		2015	
WTMP	1150	AM	Tampa, Florida	2011	2014	
WXCT	990	AM	Southington, Connecticut	2004	2015	Acquired for US$1.4 million.

- KCZZ/1480: Mission (Kansas City market) (sold to TBLC Media in 2015)
- KDTD/1340: Kansas City (sold to TBLC Media in 2015)
- WAKX/102.7: Narragansett Pier, Rhode Island (sold to Rhode Island Public Radio in 2007; now WNPE)
- WFMO/860: Fairmont (sold to Truth Broadcasting Corporation in 2015)
- WNTS/1590: Beech Grove (Indianapolis market; sold to Continental Broadcast Group, L.L.C. in 2015)
- WOLT/103.3: Greer, South Carolina (sold to Earth Radio Broadcasting in 2014; now WLTS)
- WSTS/100.9: Fairmont (sold to Truth Broadcasting Corporation in 2015)
- WTOB/1380: Winston-Salem (sold to TLBC Media in 2015)
- WTUV-FM/105.7: Eminence (Louisville market; sold to UB Louisville in 2014; now WHBE-FM)
- WTUV/620: Louisville (sold to W & B Broadcasting Co., Inc. in 2014)
- WWBG/1470: Greensboro (sold to TBLC Media in 2015)
- WSGH/1040: Lewisville (Greensboro market) (sold to TBLC Media in 2015)
- WRJD/1410: Durham (sold to TBLC Media in 2015)
- WTIK/1310: Durham (sold to TBLC Media in 2015)
- WNOW/1030: Mint Hill (Charlotte market) (sold to TBLC Media in 2015)
- WOLI/910: Spartanburg "The Source 105.7FM/910AM" (sold to TBLC Media in 2015)
- WTOX/1480: Glen Allen (sold to TBLC Media in 2015)
- WVNZ/1320: Richmond "Selecta 1320" (sold to TBLC Media in 2015)
- WREJ/990: Richmond "Newstalk 990" (sold to Radio Richmond in 2016)
- WONA/1540: Richmond "Rejoice 1540" (donated to Delmarva Educational Association in 2016)
- WEMG/1310: Camden (Philadelphia market) "Mega 1310" (sold to M.S. Acquisitions & Holdings, LLC in 2016)
