= WVNZ (AM) =

Simulcast of WULT, Sandston
- Highland Springs, Virginia; United States
- Broadcast area: Metro Richmond
- Frequency: 1450 kHz
- Branding: Ultra Richmond

Programming
- Format: Spanish CHR

Ownership
- Owner: Mike Mazursky; (Mobile Radio Partners, Inc.)
- Sister stations: WBTL; WTOX; WULT

History
- First air date: May 18, 1959
- Former call signs: WENZ (1959–1987); WRGF (1987–1988); WCLM (1988–2017); WUWN (2017–2018); WBTL (2018–2023)

Technical information
- Licensing authority: FCC
- Facility ID: 73728
- Class: C
- Power: 960 watts unlimited
- Transmitter coordinates: 37°32′39.5″N 77°20′45.9″W
- Translator: 92.9 W225CU (Highland Springs)

Links
- Public license information: Public file; LMS
- Website: ultraradiorichmond.com

WVNZ (1450 kHz) is a Spanish CHR formatted broadcast radio station licensed to Highland Springs, Virginia, serving Metro Richmond. WVNZ is owned and operated by Mike Mazursky, through licensee Mobile Radio Partners, Inc.

== History ==
The station first signed on the air on May 18, 1959, as WENZ. Originally licensed to Highland Springs, it served the Richmond market with various formats throughout the mid-20th century. In 1987, the call letters were changed to WRGF, but this lasted only a year before the station became WCLM in 1988. Under the WCLM identity, the station was known for its long-running community-oriented programming and diverse brokered formats.

In October 2017, World Media Broadcast Company sold the station to Mobile Radio Partners, Inc. for $75,000. Following the sale, On March 14, 2018, WUWN changed its format to a hybrid of oldies and adult contemporary, branded as "Boomtown Radio". The playlist featured music from the 1960s to the 1990s. The station changed its call sign to WBTL on August 27, 2018.

On June 26, 2023, the call sign was changed to WVNZ. Shortly after, on July 24, 2023, the station dropped its oldies format to begin simulcasting the Spanish CHR programming of sister station WULT (1540 AM), branded as "Ultra Richmond".
