= Highland Springs, Virginia =

- Census-designated place
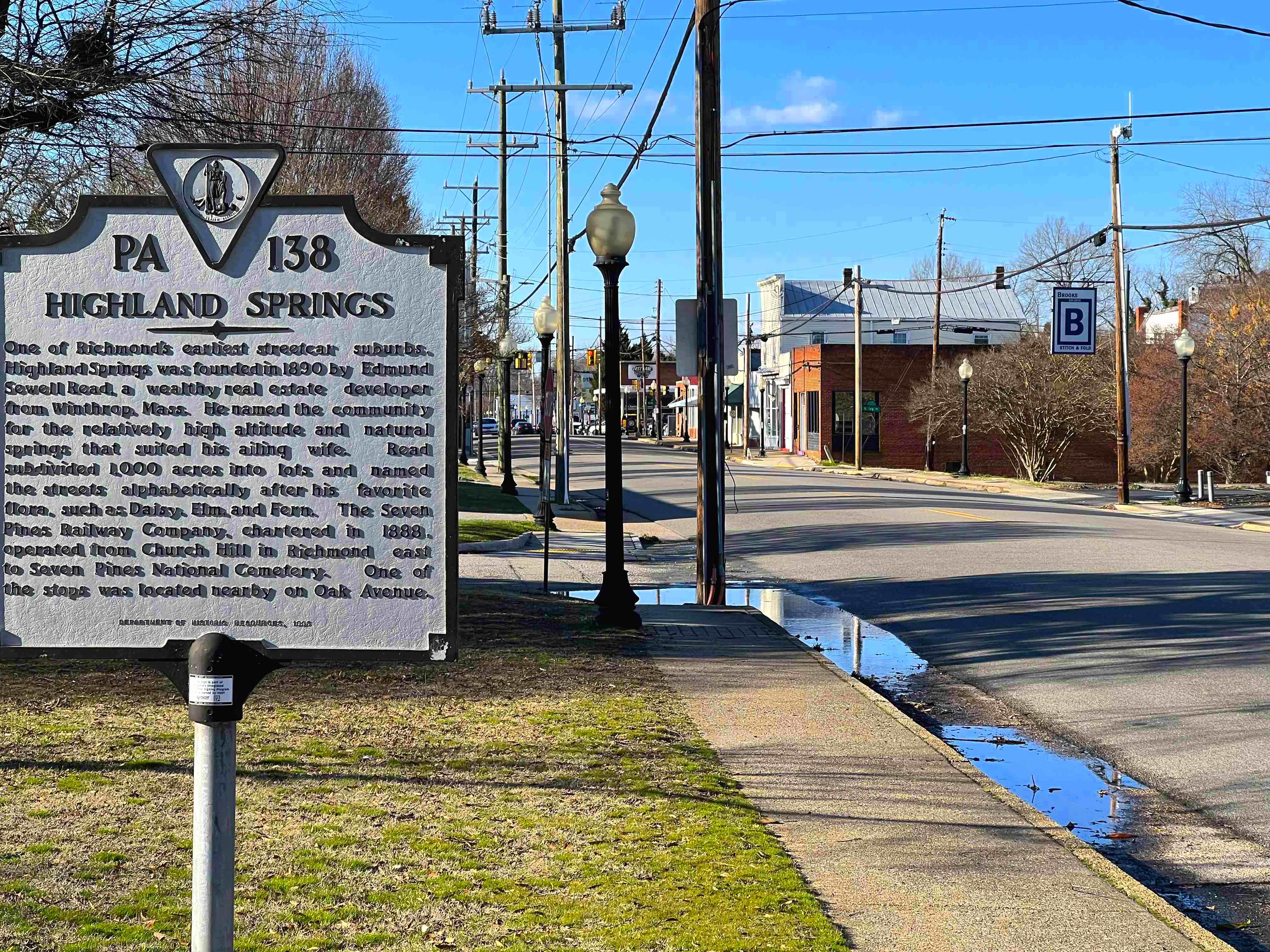
- Highland Springs historical marker, part of the Highland Springs Historic District.

- Location within Virginia Location within the United States
- Coordinates: 37°32′44″N 77°19′43″W
- Country: United States
- State: Virginia
- County: Henrico

Area
  - Total: 8.3 sq mi (21.6 km^{2})
  - Land: 8.0 sq mi (20.7 km^{2})
  - Water: 0.35 sq mi (0.9 km^{2})
- Elevation: 171 ft (52 m)

Population (2020)
  - Total: 16,604
  - Density: 2,080/sq mi (802/km^{2})
- Time zone: UTC−5 (Eastern (EST))
  - Summer (DST): UTC−4 (EDT)
- ZIP code: 23075
- Area code: 804
- FIPS code: 51-37032
- GNIS feature ID: 1499559

Highland Springs is a census-designated place (CDP) located in Henrico County, Virginia, United States, 4.3 miles (7 km) east of Richmond. The population was 16,604 at the 2020 census.

== History ==
Edmund Sewell Read founded the community of Highland Springs in the 1890s as a streetcar suburb of Richmond on the Seven Pines Railway Company's electric street railway line between the city and the Seven Pines National Cemetery. There, many Union dead were interred, primarily as a result of battles nearby during the Civil War (1861–1865), most notably during the Peninsula Campaign of 1862. The potential traffic of visiting families to the Richmond area from out-of-town needing transportation to and from the cemetery was a motivating factor for inception of the new street railway.

Read came to the area from Boston in hopes of finding a suitable climate for his ailing wife. The natural springs in the area made it a suitable choice for the Read family, and apparently an inspiration for the new name.

Approximately mid-way along the new streetcar route from Richmond through eastern Henrico County, Read bought a 1,000-acre (400 ha) tract of land and divided it into lots. He laid out along the main street which was the pre-existing Nine Mile Road, new cross streets named in alphabetical order after plants, beginning from the west: Ash, Beech, Cedar, Daisy, Elm, Fern, Grove, Holly, Ivy, Juniper, Kalmia, Linden, Maple, Oak, Pine, Quince, Rose, and Spruce. One block south of and parallel to the Nine Mile Road, Read Street was named for its founder, Edmund Sewell Read.

The Sewells' large brick home is situated on the south side of Nine Mile Road between Grove and Holly, with Read Street to its rear. Today it serves as a medical office complex.

== Geography ==
According to the United States Census Bureau, the CDP has a total area of 8.3 square miles (21.6 km^{2}), of which 8.0 square miles (20.7 km^{2}) is land and 0.35 square miles (0.9 km^{2}), or 4.09%, is water.

=== Climate ===
The climate in this area is characterized by hot, humid summers and generally mild to cool winters. According to the Köppen Climate Classification system, Highland Springs has a humid subtropical climate, abbreviated "Cfa" on climate maps.

== Demographics ==
Historical population
Census	Pop.	Note	%±
1950	3,171		—
1970	7,345		—
1980	12,146		65.4%
1990	13,823		13.8%
2000	15,137		9.5%
2010	15,711		3.8%
2020	16,604		5.7%
U.S. Decennial Census; 1940 1950 1960 1970; 1980 1990 2000; 2010

Highland Springs was first listed as an unincorprated community in the 1950 U.S. census. The community did not appear in the 1960 U.S. census. It was listed as a census designated place in the 1980 U.S. census.

=== Racial and ethnic composition ===
Highland Springs CDP, Virginia – Racial and ethnic composition Note: the US Census treats Hispanic/Latino as an ethnic category. This table excludes Latinos from the racial categories and assigns them to a separate category. Hispanics/Latinos may be of any race.
Race / Ethnicity (NH = Non-Hispanic)	Pop 1980	Pop 2010	Pop 2020	% 1980	% 2010	% 2020
White alone (NH)	10,027	4,580	3,712	82.55%	29.15%	22.36%
Black or African American alone (NH)	1,938	10,303	11,475	15.96%	65.58%	69.11%
Native American or Alaska Native alone (NH)		66	62		0.42%	0.37%
Asian alone (NH)		76	80		0.48%	0.48%
Native Hawaiian or Pacific Islander alone (NH)		7	9		0.04%	0.05%
Other race alone (NH)		24	92		0.15%	0.55%
Mixed race or Multiracial (NH)		321	560		2.04%	3.37%
Hispanic or Latino (any race)	62	334	614	0.51%	2.13%	3.70%
Total	12,146	15,711	16,604	100.00%	100.00%	100.00%

=== 2020 census ===
As of the 2020 census, Highland Springs had a population of 16,604. The median age was 37.2 years. 24.7% of residents were under the age of 18, and 14.6% were 65 years of age or older. For every 100 females there were 81.1 males, and for every 100 females age 18 and over there were 75.7 males.

99.3% of residents lived in urban areas, while 0.7% lived in rural areas.

There were 6,486 households in Highland Springs, of which 34.7% had children under the age of 18 living in them. Of all households, 29.0% were married-couple households, 17.6% were households with a male householder and no spouse or partner present, and 44.9% were households with a female householder and no spouse or partner present. About 27.4% of all households were made up of individuals, and 9.9% had someone living alone who was 65 years of age or older.

There were 6,806 housing units, of which 4.7% were vacant. The homeowner vacancy rate was 2.0% and the rental vacancy rate was 3.5%.

=== 2000 census ===
As of the census of 2000, there were 15,137 people, 5,788 households, and 4,132 families residing in the CDP. The population density was 1,777.0 people per square mile (686.0/km^{2}). There were 6,040 housing units at an average density of 709.0/sq mi (273.7/km^{2}). The racial makeup of the CDP was 44.48% White, 51.83% African American, 0.62% Native American, 0.64% Asian, 0.01% Pacific Islander, 0.80% from other races, and 1.63% from two or more races. Hispanic or Latino of any race were 1.55% of the population.

There were 5,788 households, out of which 37.9% had children under the age of 18 living with them, 41.2% were married couples living together, 25.5% had a female householder with no husband present, and 28.6% were non-families. 23.4% of all households were made up of individuals, and 7.6% had someone living alone who was 65 years of age or older. The average household size was 2.59 and the average family size was 3.03.

In the CDP, the population was spread out, with 29.1% under the age of 18, 8.5% from 18 to 24, 31.1% from 25 to 44, 21.2% from 45 to 64, and 10.2% who were 65 years of age or older. The median age was 34 years. For every 100 females, there were 84.1 males. For every 100 females age 18 and over, there were 76.8 males.

The median income for a household in the CDP was $39,936, and the median income for a family was $42,887. Males had a median income of $33,117 versus $25,726 for females. The per capita income for the CDP was $17,979. About 8.5% of families and 10.4% of the population were below the poverty line, including 14.4% of those under age 18 and 6.5% of those age 65 or over.

== Other information ==
Although no physical traces of the street railway remain in Highland Springs, old brick streetcar barns are extant both in Richmond, in the Church Hill area, and in Sandston at Seven Pines, where an unusual street configuration is attributed to the turning path of the old trolley cars at today's U.S. Route 60.

The new ABA team the Richmond Elite are based in Highland Springs, their home arena being Highland Springs High School.
