= Seven Pines, Virginia =

Coordinates: 37°31′14″N 77°18′10″W

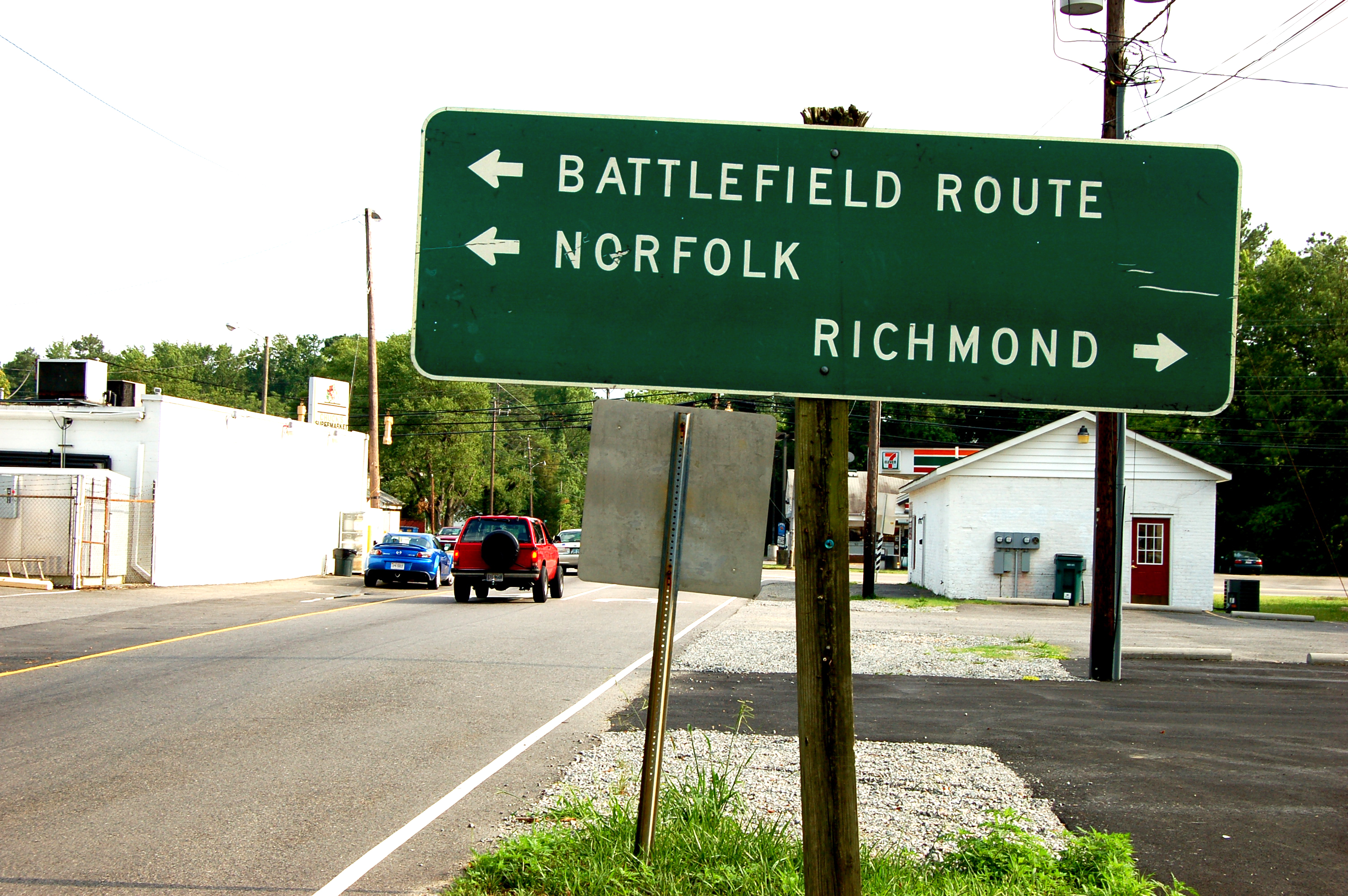
Road near Seven Pines.

Seven Pines is a community located in the unincorporated town of Sandston in Henrico County, Virginia. Cemetery records state the name is derived from for a group of seven pine trees planted within the national cemetery in 1869 near the intersection of the old Williamsburg-Richmond Stage Road and the Nine Mile Road, however, the name Seven Pines pre-dates the establishment of the cemetery. Earlier maps and records, especially those from the American Civil War, commonly refer to the location as Seven Pines. Today, the surrounding area is still referred to as Seven Pines although it lies within the census-designated place of Sandston and uses Sandston postal addresses.

During the Civil War, several major battles of the Peninsula Campaign in 1862 took place nearby, including the Battle of Seven Pines (as named in Confederate records; the name in Federal records was Fair Oaks for the nearby town of that name), and the smaller engagements of Oak Grove, Golding's Farm, Allen's Farm, Savage's Station, and White Oak Swamp.

The local Seven Pines Elementary School takes it name from the town.
