= Richmond National Battlefield Park =

Group of historical battlefields in Virginia, US

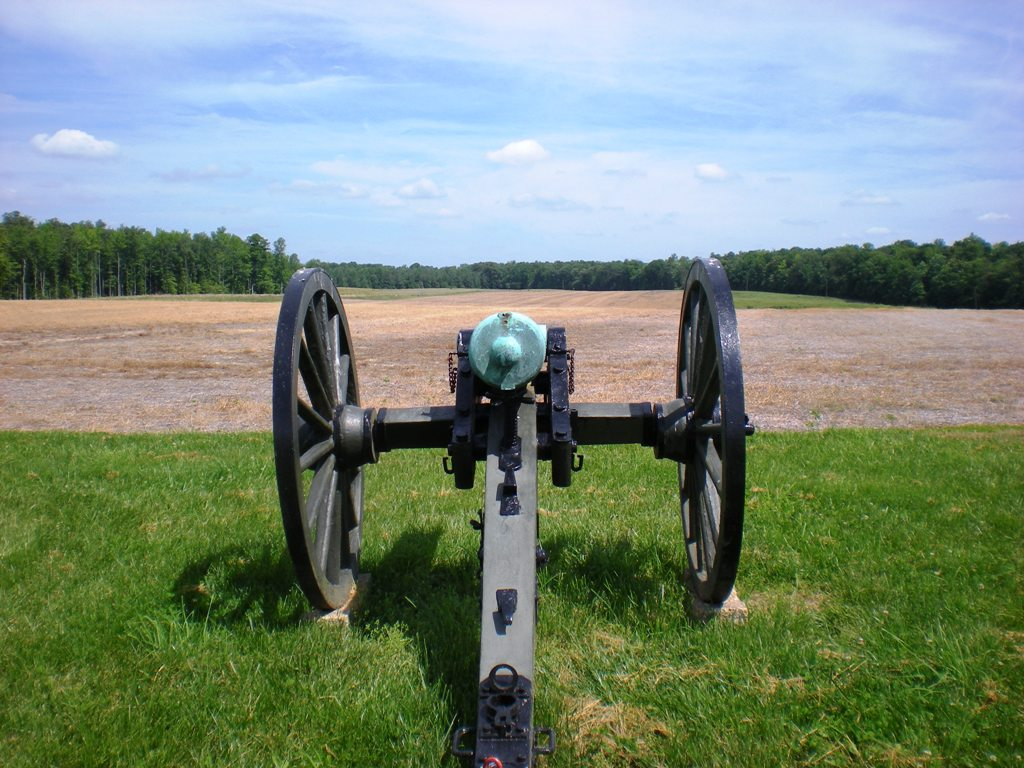
- Union gun position at Malvern Hill

- Location within Virginia Location within the United States
- Location: Richmond, Hanover County, Henrico County, Chesterfield County, Virginia, USA
- Nearest city: Richmond, Virginia
- Coordinates: 37°25′45″N 77°22′25″W
- Area: 8,168.87 acres (33.0582 km^{2})
- Established: March 2, 1936
- Visitors: 149,545 (in 2025)
- Governing body: National Park Service
- Website: Richmond National Battlefield Park
- Richmond National Battlefield Park
- U.S. National Register of Historic Places
- U.S. Historic district
- U.S. National Battlefield Park
- Virginia Landmarks Register
- NRHP reference No.: 66000836
- VLR No.: 043-0033

Significant dates
- Added to NRHP: October 15, 1966
- Designated VLR: January 16, 1973

The Richmond National Battlefield Park commemorates 13 American Civil War sites around Richmond, Virginia, which served as the capital of the Confederate States of America for most of the war. The park connects certain features within the city with defensive fortifications and battle sites around it.

== Richmond in the American Civil War ==
Virginia voted to secede from the United States in May 1861, and became part of the Confederacy. As a major manufacturing centre, Richmond was soon chosen to be the Confederate capital. The environs of the city would witness much combat over the next four years.

Richmond National Battlefield Park occupies almost 3000 acres in the coastal plain of Virginia, bounded by the James and Chickahominy River watersheds, much of it preserved as it would have looked in the Civil War, with scenic meadows and old-growth forest enabling abundant wildlife.

== Richmond National Battlefield Park sites in Richmond ==
=== Tredegar Iron Works ===
The chief ironworks of the Confederacy, and a big factor in the decision to make Richmond its capital. It supplied about half the artillery used by the Confederate States Army. Visitors centre and Civil War museum, National Park Service Rangers, interactive theaters, plasma-screen maps.

=== Chimborazo Hospital ===
The Confederacy's biggest hospital camp, accommodating up to 4000 patients at a time, mainly for convalescence. Museum with surgical and medical displays, filmshow.

== Campaigns affecting Richmond: protected sites ==
=== Peninsula Campaign (March 17 - May 31, 1862) ===
This was McClellan’s attempt to attack Richmond from the east, via the James River. Although obstructed by Confederate artillery, he managed to approach within four miles of the city, but was stopped in a surprise attack by General Joseph E. Johnston.

Chicakhominy Bluffs
Trying to take Richmond, McClellan was halted by this natural defensive barrier with the river at spring flood-level, and parts of his army separated from each other by the mile-wide waterway.

Drewry's Bluff
A sharp bend on the James River, whose defensive battery was too high for the Union Navy’s guns to engage. The fleet had to withdraw, delaying McClellan’s proposed advance on Richmond.

=== The Seven Days Battles (June 25 - July 1, 1862) ===
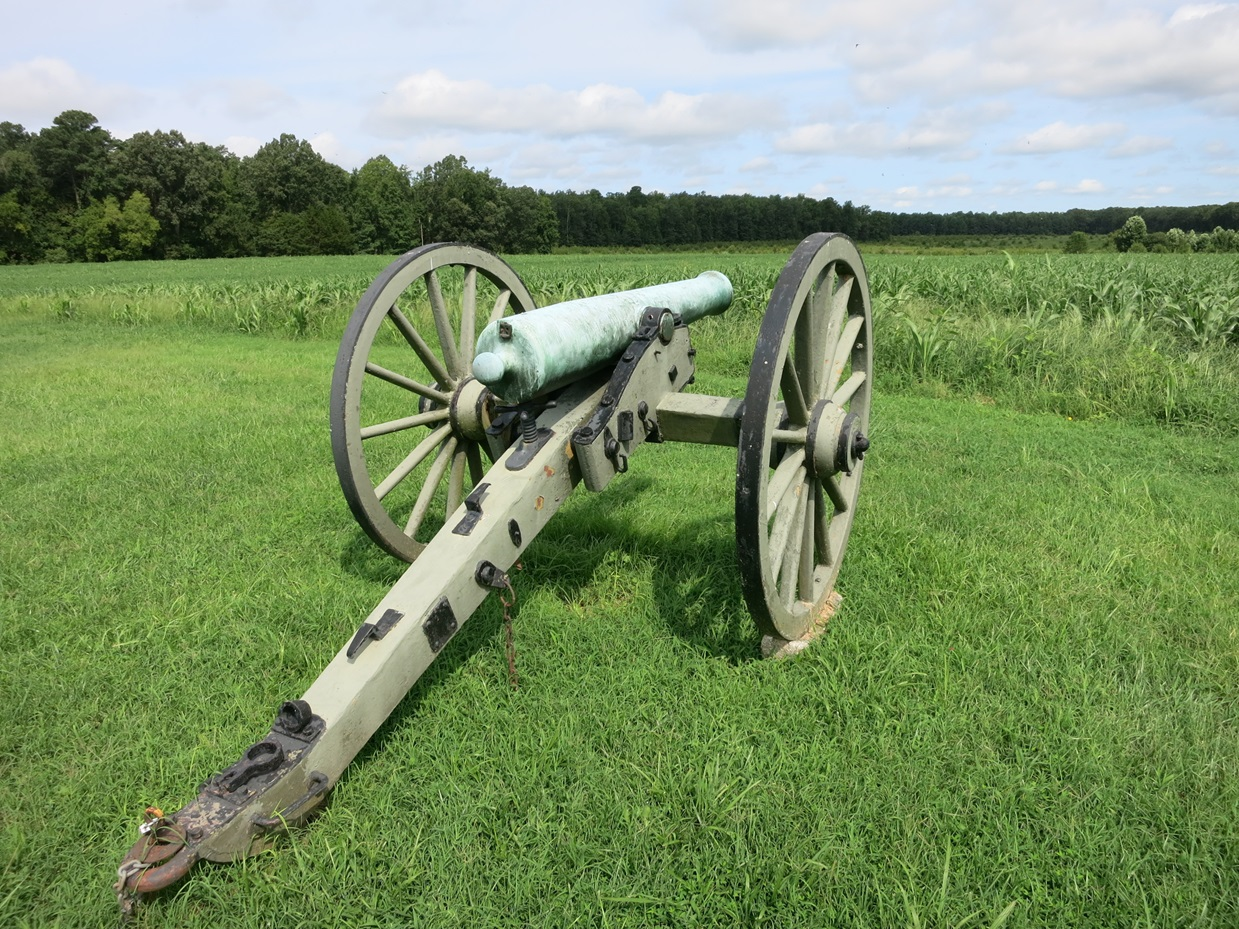
12-pounder Napoleon at Malvern Hill faces north toward the Confederate positions.

A rapid sequence of battles (sometimes reckoned as part of the Peninsula Campaign), initiated by the newly-appointed Confederate commander Robert E. Lee. McClellan soon had to retreat, but Lee failed in his plan to cut-off the Union army.

Beaver Dam Creek
Also called Mechanicsville. Lee’s partner ‘Stonewall’ Jackson arrived (untypically) late, and the Confederates took heavy casualties, though the Union army retreated downstream to a safer position. Walking trail along the lower section of the creek.

Gaines' Mill
McClellan’s defenses seemed impregnable, but Lee mounted his biggest attack of the war with 57,000 men, and McClellan retreated to the James River, abandoning his campaign to take Richmond. Walking trails, interpretive signs.

Glendale
Lee saw an opportunity to cut-off McClellan’s army from the river, but Union counter-attacks saved their line of retreat. Several Union generals were wounded and General George A. McCall was captured. Visitor Centre, seasonal.

Malvern Hill
Last of the Seven Days Battles. A tactical win for the Union, largely due to superior artillery, but their commander McClellan was absent, reconnoitring Harrison’s Landing, to where his army soon retreated. Visitor Centre, walking tour, driving tour.

=== The Overland Campaign (May 4 - June 12, 1864) ===
In U.S. Grant’s first campaign as General-in-Chief, he operated in the field, alongside the army commander George Meade. It started with a standoff at the Battle of the Wilderness, followed by two defeats at Spotsylvania Court House and Cold Harbor.

Totopotomoy Creek
A failed attempt by Grant to lure Lee into open terrain. The Confederates were securely entrenched behind the creek, and resisted all assaults. The splendid mansion of Rural Plains survived much bombardment. Tour of Rural Plains (Shelton House).

Cold Harbor
After some early success, Grant’s massive frontal assault against Lee’s fortified positions was beaten back with huge casualties. Grant said it was his biggest regret. But it would be Lee’s last victory. Visitor centre and forest trail with interpretive displays.

=== Siege of Petersburg (June 14, 1864 - April 2, 1865) ===
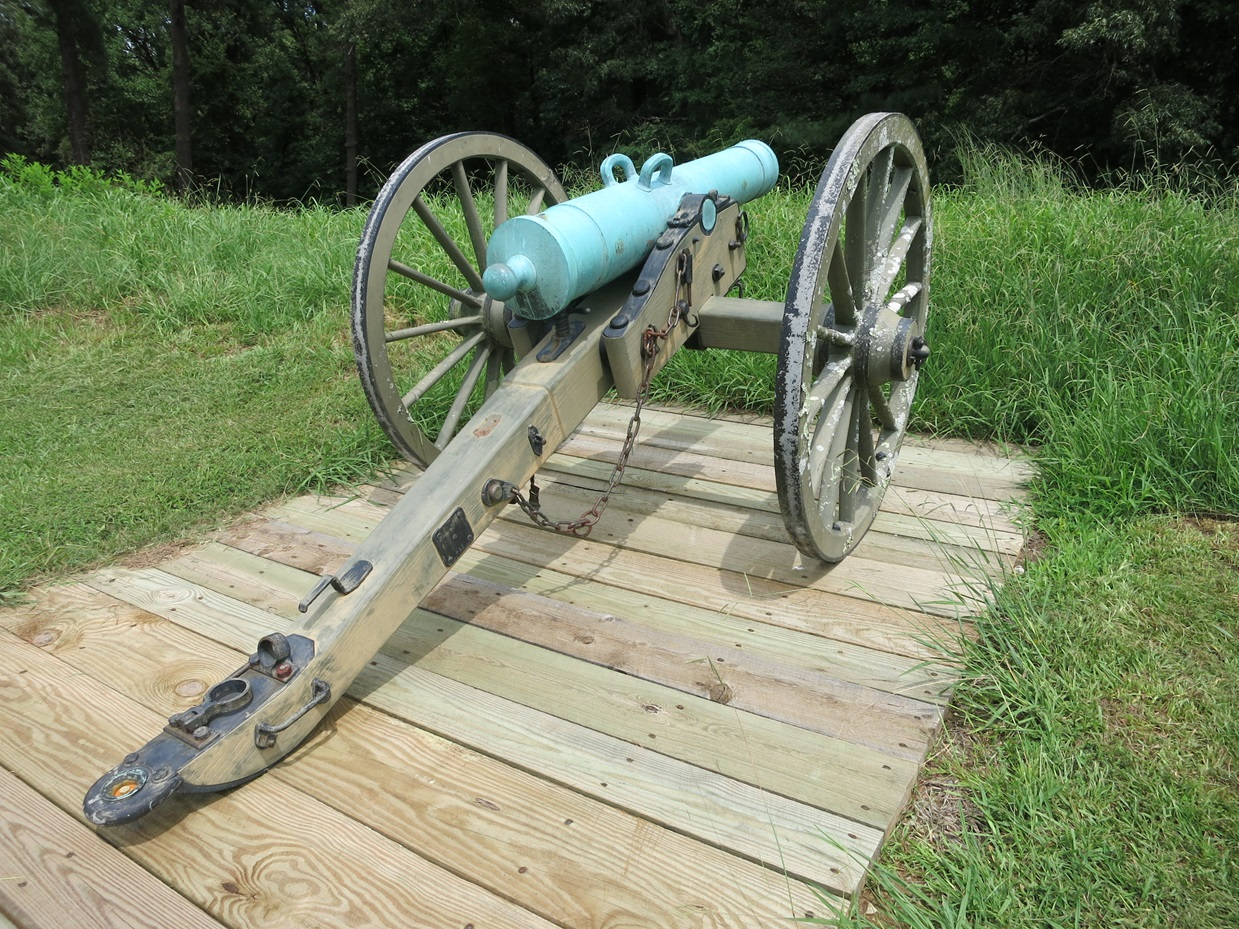
Model 1841 24-pounder howitzer in Battery 5 at Petersburg National Battlefield.

After his reverses in the Overland Campaign, U.S. Grant settled into a siege, where he could bring his superior numbers to bear on Lee's over-stretched and starving Confederates. When Petersburg fell, the early surrender of Richmond was inevitable.

Fort Harrison
A key fortification in the defense of Richmond, it was captured by Benjamin Butler, causing Lee to move his whole line west. It was renamed Fort Burnham for a brigade commander killed in the action. Visitor centre, seasonal.

Howlett Line
This was a defensive earthworks across the Bermuda Hundred peninsula, which enabled a small Confederate force to keep Benjamin Butler’s army at bay ‘like a cork in a bottle’, in U.S. Grant’s phrase.

== See also ==
- Petersburg National Battlefield, covering southern portions of the Richmond-Petersburg Campaign.
- Richmond National Cemetery, located at the site of the Battle of Seven Pines
- Seven Pines National Cemetery, located at the site of the Battle of Seven Pines
- Glendale National Cemetery, located at the site of the Battle of Glendale
- Fort Harrison National Cemetery
