= WLEE-FM =

Radio station in Sherman, Mississippi

- Sherman, Mississippi; United States
- Broadcast area: Tupelo, Mississippi
- Frequency: 95.1 MHz
- Branding: 95.1 The Farm

Programming
- Format: Country
- Affiliations: Compass Media Networks

Ownership
- Owner: Southern Electronics Company
- Sister stations: WLEE (AM)

History
- First air date: January 4, 1976 (as WONA-FM)
- Former call signs: WONA-FM (1976–2018)

Technical information
- Licensing authority: FCC
- Facility ID: 61281
- Class: A
- ERP: 1,450 watts
- HAAT: 91.8 meters (301 ft)
- Transmitter coordinates: 34°19′26.4″N 88°42′43.2″W

Links
- Public license information: Public file; LMS
- Webcast: Listen live
- Website: www.951thefarm.com

WLEE-FM (95.1 MHz) is a radio station broadcasting a country music format, licensed to Sherman, Mississippi, United States. The station, established in 1976 as a sister station to WLEE (1570 AM, former callsign WONA), is currently owned by Southern Electronics Company.

In September 2018, WLEE-FM changed its format from country to sports, branded as "ESPN Mississippi 95.1 The Fan" with programming from ESPN Radio. On March 12, 2019, WLEE-FM changed its format back to country, branded as "95.1 The Farm".
