= WREJ =

Radio station in Richmond, Virginia

- Richmond, Virginia; United States
- Broadcast area: Richmond, Virginia; Petersburg, Virginia
- Frequency: 990 kHz
- Branding: Rejoice 101.3 FM 990 AM

Programming
- Format: Black gospel

Ownership
- Owner: Jim Jacobs; (Radio Richmond LLC)
- Sister stations: WBTL; WTOX

History
- First air date: May 4, 1951
- Former call signs: WANT (1951–1992); WTMZ (1992–1993); WTMM (1993–1999); WVNZ (1999); WLEE (1999–2016)

Technical information
- Licensing authority: FCC
- Facility ID: 50401
- Class: D
- Power: 1,000 watts (day); 13 watts (night)
- Transmitter coordinates: 37°31′40.5″N 77°22′46.9″W

Links
- Public license information: Public file; LMS
- Webcast: Listen live
- Website: rejoicerichmond.com

WREJ is a black gospel formatted broadcast radio station licensed to Richmond, Virginia, serving Richmond and Petersburg in Virginia. WREJ is owned by Jim Jacobs, through licensee Radio Richmond LLC. The transmitter is in Montrose, Virginia.

WREJ also transmits through translator W267CB, a 250-watt transmitter licensed to Richmond.
