= Seven Pines National Cemetery =

Historic veterans cemetery in Henrico County, Virginia

- U.S. National Register of Historic Places
- Virginia Landmarks Register
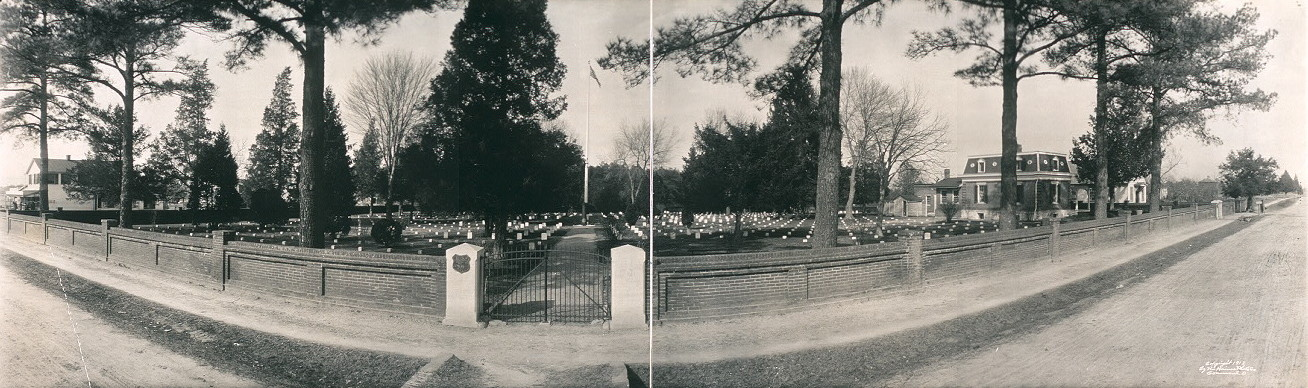
- Panoramic view of Seven Pines Battlefield National Cemetery in 1912 photo from U.S. Library of Congress Collection

- Location within Virginia Location within the United States
- Location: 400 E. Williamsburg Rd., Sandston, Virginia
- Coordinates: 37°31′14″N 77°18′07″W
- Area: 1.9 acres (0.77 ha)
- Built: 1866
- Architect: Meigs, Montgomery C.
- Architectural style: Second Empire
- MPS: Civil War Era National Cemeteries MPS
- NRHP reference No.: 95001182
- VLR No.: 043-0755

Significant dates
- Added to NRHP: October 26, 1995
- Designated VLR: August 28, 1995

Seven Pines National Cemetery is a national cemetery located in the Seven Pines area of the unincorporated town of Sandston in Henrico County, Virginia. Although cemetery records state the name is derived from for a group of seven pine trees planted within the national cemetery in 1869 near the intersection of the old Williamsburg-Richmond Stage Road and the Nine Mile Road, the name Seven Pines pre-dates the establishment of the cemetery.

The National Cemetery was established in 1866. Most of the interments are of Union soldiers that were originally hastily buried on the Seven Pines battlefield in makeshift graves. The cemetery's 1.9 acres (0.77 ha) are located near the center of General George B. McClellan's second and main defense line of the May 31, 1862. To help facilitate visitation, an electric street railway was built to the site by a company formed in 1888. The railway has long since been removed and most visitors now park in the cemetery's driveway next to the caretaker's lodge.

Seven Pines National Cemetery was placed on the National Register of Historic Places in 1995.
