= Samuel P. Moore =

American military physician (1813–1889)

Samuel Preston Moore
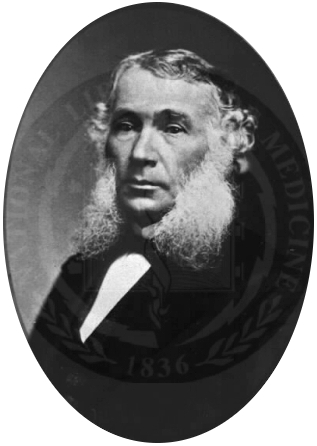
- Samuel Preston Moore
- Born: September 16, 1813; Charleston, South Carolina
- Died: May 31, 1889 (aged 75); Richmond, Virginia
- Burial place: Hollywood Cemetery; Richmond, Virginia
- Military career
- Allegiance: United States of America; Confederate States of America
- Branch: United States Army; Confederate States Army
- Service years: 1835–61 (USA); 1861–65 (CSA)
- Rank: Major (USA); Acting Brigadier General (CSA)
- Commands: Surgeon General of the CSA
- Conflicts: Mexican–American War; American Civil War

Samuel Preston Moore (September 16, 1813 – May 31, 1889) was an American military physician, who served in the medical corps of the United States Army during the Mexican–American War, and later as the Confederate Surgeon General throughout nearly all of the American Civil War.

== Biography ==
=== Early life and career ===
Samuel P. Moore was born in 1813 in Charleston, South Carolina. He was a son of Stephen West Moore, a prominent banker in Charleston (originally from Virginia), and his wife, Eleanore Screvan Gilbert. His brother, Stephen M. Westmore, also served in the Confederacy. Moore was educated in the local public schools of Charleston, and then attended South Carolina Medical College with the intention of becoming a physician. He graduated in 1834 and relocated to Little Rock, Arkansas, to start his medical practice.

On March 14, 1835, Moore entered the U.S. Army and was appointed as an assistant surgeon. In this capacity he serviced in the American frontier, including regions of Missouri, Kansas, Florida, as well as along the Texas border with Mexico. Moore married Mary Augusta Brown in 1845.

Moore also served as a surgeon during the Mexican–American War, which lasted from 1846 to 1848. He befriended Col. Jefferson Davis, the future Confederate President, who was greatly impressed with Moore's abilities. Following the war with Mexico, Moore served in several U.S. Army postings, including a short stint at the United States Military Academy at West Point as a surgeon. On March 30, 1849, he was promoted to the rank of major in the army's Medical Corps.

=== Civil War service ===
When the American Civil War began in 1861, Moore was still a U.S. Army surgeon. He resigned his commission on February 25, and returned to his medical practice in Little Rock, Arkansas. After the state of Arkansas seceded from the Union, Moore was approached by Jefferson Davis to join the Confederate cause, who cited "the army’s unfortunate military situation and the lack of trained medical men..." to persuade him On March 16 Moore was assigned to lead the new Confederate Army Medical Department as surgeon general. He replaced Charles H. Smith, who had been the acting surgeon general. Moore assumed his post on July 30; he would hold this position until the end of the war. By 1863 Moore's headquarters were the Confederate capital of Richmond, Virginia. He also would set up a Reserve Surgical Corps.

Facing shortages in medicines, supplies, and equipment due to the ongoing Union blockade of Southern ports, as well as a shortage of few trained surgeons, Moore's job was difficult. He raised the recruiting standards and gave the most capable surgeons positions of authority. Moore designed the barracks-hospital layout, which is still in use today. This single level pavilion-style hospital was ordered built throughout the South. He improved the field ambulance corps and supplemented the few available medicines with drugs made from the South's indigenous plants, which were produced in laboratories set up by Moore.

To address the quality of surgeons, Moore organized an examination system to identify untrained doctors. If they failed, the doctor would serve as an attendant in a hospital for a time and retake the test. This system allowed semi-trained surgeons to be further educated, and unusable doctors to be dismissed from service. In 1864 Moore established the Confederate States Medical and Surgical Journal, a manual to instruct the surgeons throughout the army; it included both exact descriptions and drawings of operations. During the war Moore also founded the Association of Army and Navy Surgeons of the Confederate States of America. This organization is believed to be the oldest military medical society in the United States. He also added dentists to the hospitals, the first time in American history its soldiers and sailors had access to this service. By the end of the war in 1865, the Medical Department of the Confederacy had about three thousand men under Moore.

=== Postbellum ===
After the war ended in 1865, Moore resumed his life as a civilian doctor. He began a medical practice in Richmond, where he would spend the rest of his life. From 1877 to 1883 Moore also served on the Richmond School Board. He died in Richmond in May 1889 and was buried in the city's Hollywood Cemetery.

== Legacy ==
While Moore's abilities and effectiveness have been disputed, Jefferson Davis approved of his performance. Military historian Bruce Allardice describes his contemporary judgments as positive, citing praises such as "his great work as an organizer, his remarkable executive ability" and his "great brusqueness of manner and his sternness as a disciplinarian." Military historian David J. Eicher disagrees, saying "Surg. Gen. William A. Hammond (U.S.) and Samuel P. Moore (C.S.) were relatively ineffective as administrators..." Another summary also praises Moore's results, stating:

With skill and dedication, Dr. Moore transformed the medical corps into one of the most effective departments of the Confederate military and was responsible for saving thousands of lives on the battlefield.

Moore's rank in the Confederate Army has also been disputed. When the Confederate Army's Medical Department was organized on February 26, 1861, the legislation stated the surgeon general would be a colonel (as was common for the heads of Confederate staff bureaus). However, Military historian Bruce Allardice considers Moore to be a brigadier general, as did Confederate Veteran magazine. The Confederate Congress's Act of February 27, 1861, stipulated that the post would be a staff officer only. Moore is also listed as an "unsubstantiated" brigadier general of the South Carolina militia, appointed in 1865. Subsequent legislation to make the surgeon general a brigadier was proposed but never became law.

== See also ==
- List of American Civil War generals (Acting Confederate)
