= WLEE (AM) =

- Winona, Mississippi; United States
- Frequency: 1570 kHz
- Branding: The Hawg

Programming
- Format: Country
- Affiliations: AP Radio

Ownership
- Owner: Seth Kent; (Back Forty Broadcasting, LLC)
- Sister stations: WLEE-FM

History
- First air date: October 25, 1958
- Former call signs: WONA (1958–2016)

Technical information
- Licensing authority: FCC
- Facility ID: 61280
- Class: D
- Power: 1,000 watts (day); 25 watts (night)
- Transmitter coordinates: 33°27′52.4″N 89°44′11.3″W
- Translator: 98.1 W251CN (Winona)

Links
- Public license information: Public file; LMS

WLEE (1570 AM) is a radio station licensed to serve Winona, Mississippi, United States. The station is owned by Seth Kent, through licensee Back Forty Broadcasting, LLC.

WLEE broadcasts a country music format including select news programming from AP Radio.

The station, established in 1958, was assigned the call sign WONA by the Federal Communications Commission. The station changed its call sign to WLEE on March 15, 2016.
