= Oakwood–Chimborazo Historic District =

Historic district in Virginia, United States

- U.S. National Register of Historic Places
- U.S. Historic district
- Virginia Landmarks Register
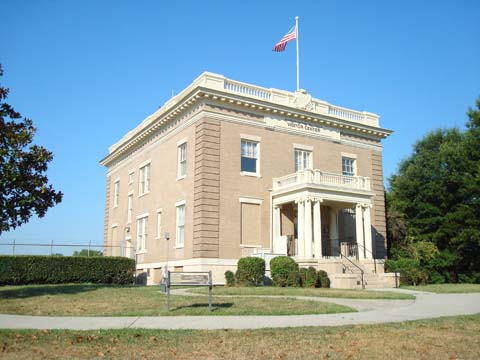
- Chimborazo Museum, August 2008

- Location within Virginia Location within the United States
- Location: Roughly N 30th-N 39th St., Chimborazo, Meldon, Oakwood, E Broad, Briel, E Clay, E Leigh, M, E Marshall, N, O, and P, Richmond, Virginia
- Coordinates: 37°31′53″N 77°24′03″W
- Area: 434 acres (176 ha)
- Built: 1861
- Architect: Anderson, D. Wiley; et al.
- Architectural style: Late 19th and 20th Century Revivals, Late 19th and Early 20th Century American Movements
- NRHP reference No.: 04001372
- VLR No.: 127-0821

Significant dates
- Added to NRHP: March 18, 2005
- Designated VLR: September 8, 2004

The Oakwood–Chimborazo Historic District is a national historic district of 434 acres (176 ha) located in Richmond, Virginia. It includes 1,284 contributing buildings, three contributing structures, five contributing objects and four contributing sites. It includes work by architect D. Wiley Anderson. The predominantly residential area contains a significant collection of late-19th and early-20th century, brick and frame dwellings that display an eclectic mixture of Late Victorian, Queen Anne, and Colonial Revival styles.

It was listed on the Virginia Landmarks Register on September 8, 2004, and the National Register of Historic Places on March 18, 2005.
