= WBTK =

Currently silent
- Richmond, Virginia; United States
- Broadcast area: Metro Richmond
- Frequency: 1380 kHz
- Branding: Poder 1380

Programming
- Language: Spanish
- Format: Religious

Ownership
- Owner: Mount Rich Media, LLC

History
- First air date: January 1927
- Former call signs: WMBG (1927–1966); WTVR (1966–2000); WVBB (2000–2001)

Technical information
- Licensing authority: FCC
- Facility ID: 57831
- Class: B
- Power: 5,000 watts
- Transmitter coordinates: 37°37′16.5″N 77°26′54.9″W

Links
- Public license information: Public file; LMS
- Webcast: Listen live
- Website: www.wbtk.com

WBTK is a Spanish religious formatted broadcast radio station licensed to and serving Richmond, Virginia. WBTK is owned and operated by Mount Rich Media, LLC.

== History ==
The station was first authorized on January 7, 1927, as WMBG, a 10-watt station at around 1360 kHz, to auto parts dealer Wilbur Havens. It was based on the second floor of Havens' shop on West Broad and Laurel streets in downtown Richmond, Virginia. Havens spent $500 to build the station. Although the call letters were randomly assigned from a sequential roster of available call signs, they were also said to stand for "Magnetos, Batteries, and Generators". The station began test transmissions later that month.

Following the establishment of the Federal Radio Commission (FRC), stations were initially issued a series of temporary authorizations starting on May 3, 1927, when WMBG was assigned to 1360 kHz. In addition, stations were informed that if they wanted to continue operating, they needed to file a formal license application by January 15, 1928, as the first step in determining whether they met the new "public interest, convenience, or necessity" standard. On May 25, 1928, the FRC issued General Order 32, which notified 164 stations, including WMBG, that "From an examination of your application for future license it does not find that public interest, convenience, or necessity would be served by granting it." However, the station successfully convinced the commission that it should remain licensed.

On November 11, 1928, the FRC made a major reallocation of station transmitting frequencies, as part of a reorganization resulting from its implementation of General Order 40. WMBG was assigned to 1210 kHz, sharing the frequency with WTAZ.

By 1939, the station had moved to a new studio a few blocks down West Broad. In 1947, Havens added an FM station on 98.1, WCOD, followed a year later by the South's first television station, WTVR-TV (channel 6). Channel 6 is still located on West Broad, years after its former radio sisters moved out.

Havens sold WTVR, WMBG, and WCOD to Roy H. Park Communications in 1966. Park changed the radio stations' call signs to WTVR (AM) and WTVR-FM, respectively. When Park died in 1993, the company's assets were sold to a Lexington, Kentucky group of investors that sold the radio properties separately to various owners, with WTVR-AM-FM going to Clear Channel Communications in 1995. The AM station changed its calls to WVBB in 2000. Clear Channel sold the AM station to Salem Communications in 2001 and changed the format to Christian talk as WBTK. In 2006, the station was sold to Mount Rich Media and changed to Spanish Christian talk.

In October 2026, WBTK's license was surrendered to the Federal Communications Commission (FCC). It was cancelled on October 5, but was reinstated on November 2 per the licensee's request; the station then informed the FCC that it was silent due to financial issues.
