= Sandston, Virginia =

- Census-designated place
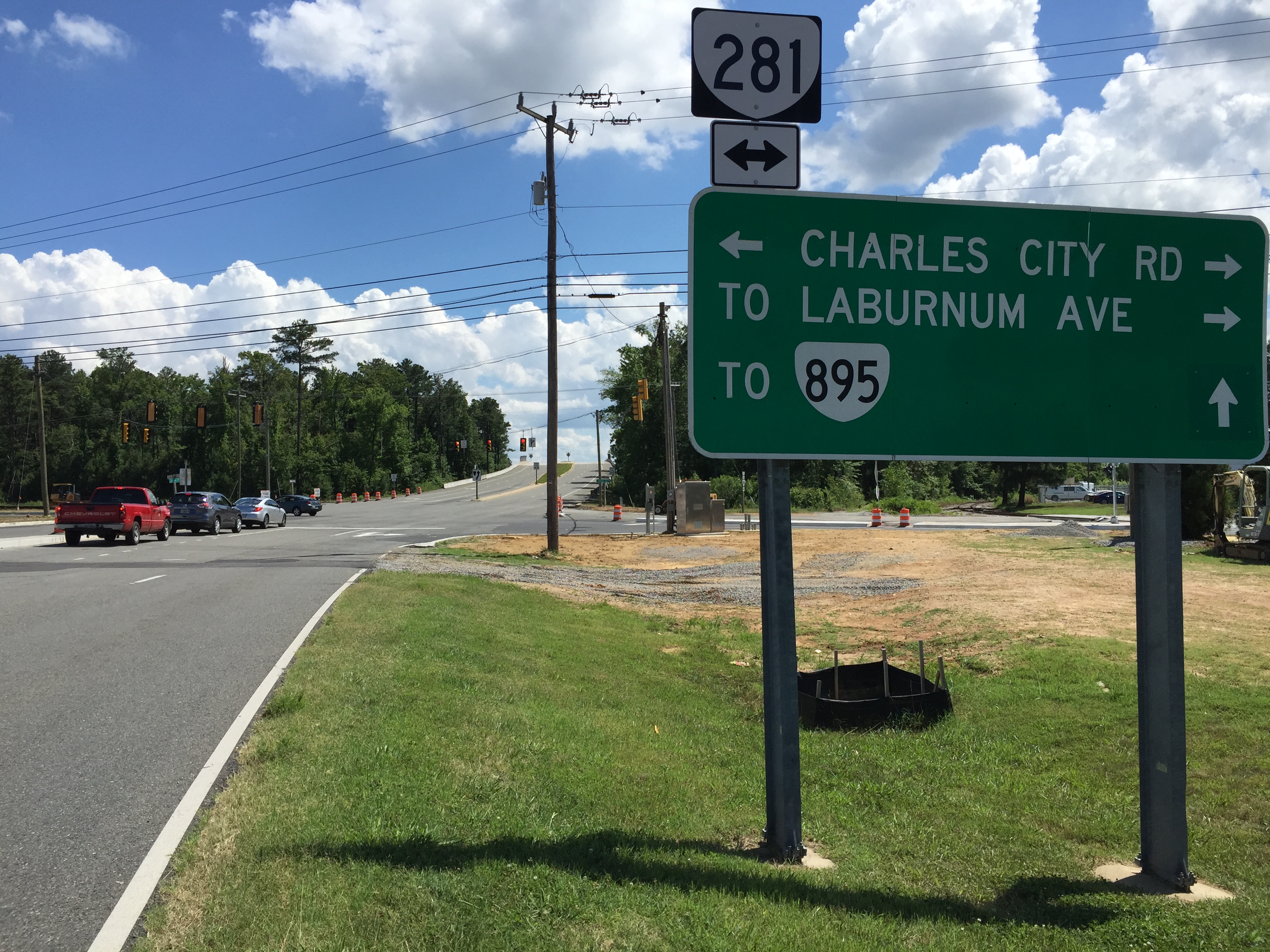
- View south along Virginia State Route 281 (Airport Drive) at Charles City Road in Sandston
- Interactive map of Sandston, Virginia
- Coordinates: 37°31′25″N 77°18′57″W
- Country: United States
- State: Virginia
- County: Henrico

Area
  - Total: 10.0 sq mi (25.8 km^{2})
  - Land: 9.9 sq mi (25.6 km^{2})
  - Water: 0.077 sq mi (0.2 km^{2})

Population (2010)
  - Total: 7,571
  - Density: 766/sq mi (296/km^{2})
- Time zone: UTC−5 (Eastern (EST))
  - Summer (DST): UTC−4 (EDT)
- ZIP code: 23150

Sandston is a census-designated place (CDP) in Henrico County, Virginia, United States, just outside the state capital of Richmond. As of the 2020 census, Sandston had a population of 7,779. It was designated a Historic District by Henrico County in 2021.

== History ==
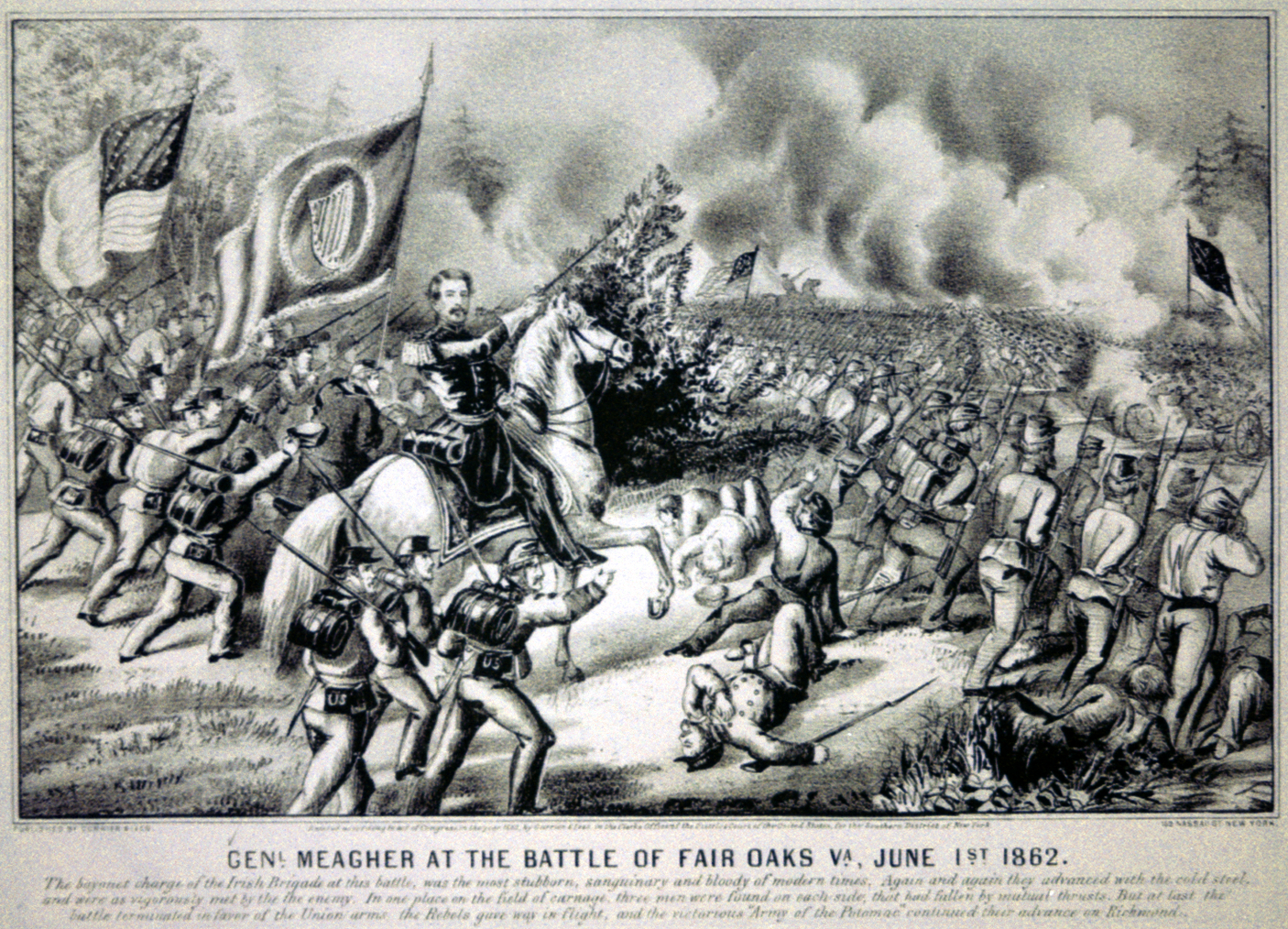
The Battle of Seven Pines

The Battle of Seven Pines took place nearby in 1862. It was second only to the Battle of Shiloh in its number of casualties up to that time. The battle was brutally fought and inconclusive, but had a profound impact on the trajectory of the war. After General Joseph E. Johnston's injury, President Jefferson Davis appointed Robert E. Lee as Commander of the Confederate Armies. Lee then initiated the Seven Days Battles, which drove the Northern forces into a retreat in late June. This was the closest the North had come to Richmond, Virginia in this offensive.

During World War I, a number of homes were built in the area for both non-commissioned officers and enlisted men. After the war, an investment group headed by Oliver J. Sands bought the land and buildings as surplus property. The community was named Sandston after Oliver Sands, the president of the Richmond and Fairfield Railway, the electric street railway line which ran through Highland Springs and Fair Oaks to the National Cemetery at Seven Pines.

The community was later served by the Fairfield Transit Company, which operated a bus barn extant at Seven Pines in 2005 and the earlier trolley car barn in Richmond on North 29th Street. The road from Richmond, through Highland Springs, to Seven Pines was named "Nine Mile Road" because of the distance of the streetcar/trolley line.

Richmond International Airport is located in Sandston.

== Demographics ==
Historical population
Census	Pop.	Note	%±
1950	3,902		—
2010	7,571		—
2020	7,779		2.7%
U.S. Decennial Census; 1940 1950 1960 1970; 1980 1990 2000 2010; As Sandston-Seven Pines in the 1950 census

Sandston was attached to the community of Seven Pines for the 1950 U.S. census (pop 3,902). It not appear in subsequent censuses until it was listed as a census designated place in the 2010 U.S. census.

=== Racial and ethnic composition ===
Sandston CDP, Virginia – Racial and ethnic composition Note: the US Census treats Hispanic/Latino as an ethnic category. This table excludes Latinos from the racial categories and assigns them to a separate category. Hispanics/Latinos may be of any race.
Race / Ethnicity (NH = Non-Hispanic)	Pop 2010	Pop 2020	% 2010	% 2020
White alone (NH)	4,459	3,680	58.90%	47.31%
Black or African American alone (NH)	2,456	3,110	32.44%	39.98%
Native American or Alaska Native alone (NH)	57	45	0.75%	0.58%
Asian alone (NH)	95	126	1.25%	1.62%
Native Hawaiian or Pacific Islander alone (NH)	2	1	0.03%	0.01%
Other race alone (NH)	6	37	0.08%	0.48%
Mixed race or Multiracial (NH)	137	305	1.81%	3.92%
Hispanic or Latino (any race)	359	475	4.74%	6.11%
Total	7,571	7,779	100.00%	100.00%
