= WBTL (AM) =

Simulcasts WULT Sandston
- Ashland, Virginia; United States
- Broadcast area: Metro Richmond
- Frequency: 1320 kHz
- Branding: Ultra Richmond

Programming
- Format: Spanish CHR

Ownership
- Owner: Michael Mazursky; (Mobile Radio Partners, Inc.)
- Sister stations: WTOX; WULT; WVNZ

History
- First air date: 1955
- Former call signs: WLLY (1955–1959); WEET (1959–1984); WRJY (1984–1986); WANI (1986–1989); WLEE (1989–1999); WVNZ (1999–2023)
- Call sign meaning: "Boomtown" (previous format)

Technical information
- Licensing authority: FCC
- Facility ID: 52050
- Class: D
- Power: 1,000 watts day; 8 watts night
- Transmitter coordinates: 37°44′47.5″N 77°29′42.9″W
- Translator: 101.7 W269DC (Richmond)

Links
- Public license information: Public file; LMS
- Website: ultraradiorichmond.com

WBTL (1320 kHz) is a Spanish language contemporary hit radio formatted broadcast radio station licensed to Ashland, Virginia, serving Metro Richmond. WBTL is owned and operated by Michael Mazursky, through licensee Mobile Radio Partners, Inc.

== Sale ==
On July 14, 2015, Davidson Media Group announced it would be selling WTOX and sister station then-WVNZ to TBLC Virginia Holdings, LLC. for $400,000. The sale was consummated on November 5, 2015.

In late 2018, Mobile Radio Partners took over programming control, and put its Boomtown Richmond format, already heard on WBTL, on WVNZ. Effective June 9, 2021, Mobile Radio Partners acquired WVNZ, WTOX, and a translator from TBLC Media for $209,500.

On June 26, 2023, WVNZ changed its call sign to WBTL.
