= Mass media in Richmond, Virginia =

Like most American cities, Richmond, Virginia is served by a variety of mass media, including television, print and radio. As of 2026, the Richmond-Petersburg market, which contains the two cities and thirty-four counties, is the 56th largest Designated Market Area in the United States, with 625,380 recorded television households.

== Print media ==
=== Daily ===
The local daily newspaper in Richmond is the Richmond Times-Dispatch.

=== Weekly ===
- Style Weekly (alternative weekly)
- Chesterfield Observer

=== Monthly / bi-monthly / quarterly ===
NORTH of the JAMES Magazine (monthly)

- Boomer Magazine (bi-monthly)
- Chesterfield Living, West Ends Best, Hanover Lifestyle (bi-monthly)
- Greater Richmond Grid Magazine (bi-monthly)
- OurHealth Richmond Magazine (bi-monthly)
- Richmond Magazine (monthly)
- RVA Magazine (quarterly)
- Virginia Business (monthly)
- Whurk (monthly)

==== News and newsmagazines ====
The Richmond Free Press and the Richmond Voice are weekly newspapers that cover the news from a predominantly African American perspective. The only Hispanic magazine in the state, La Voz Hispana de Virginia provides significant cultural and news content in both English and Spanish. There are also two major publications from the Jewish community of Richmond, published in English; The Reflector is the semi-weekly newspaper of the Jewish Federation of Richmond and Virginia Jewish Life (formerly Virginia Jewish News) is an independent monthly magazine published by the Chabad community of Richmond, but highlighting stories of general Jewish interest in Virginia. City Edition was a civic-minded newspaper that listed municipal and council related events, issues, and results, which stopped publication in October 2007. . Richmond.com is an online newsmagazine with a wide readership. Other local topical publications include Richmond Parents Magazine and V Magazine for Women. the voice of women in Richmond. Richmond Guide is a quarterly that is targeted toward visitors. The Virginia Defender is a quarterly statewide community newspaper with a press run of 16,000 distributed through nearly 300 distribution sites in Richmond, plus 16 other Virginia cities and five counties.

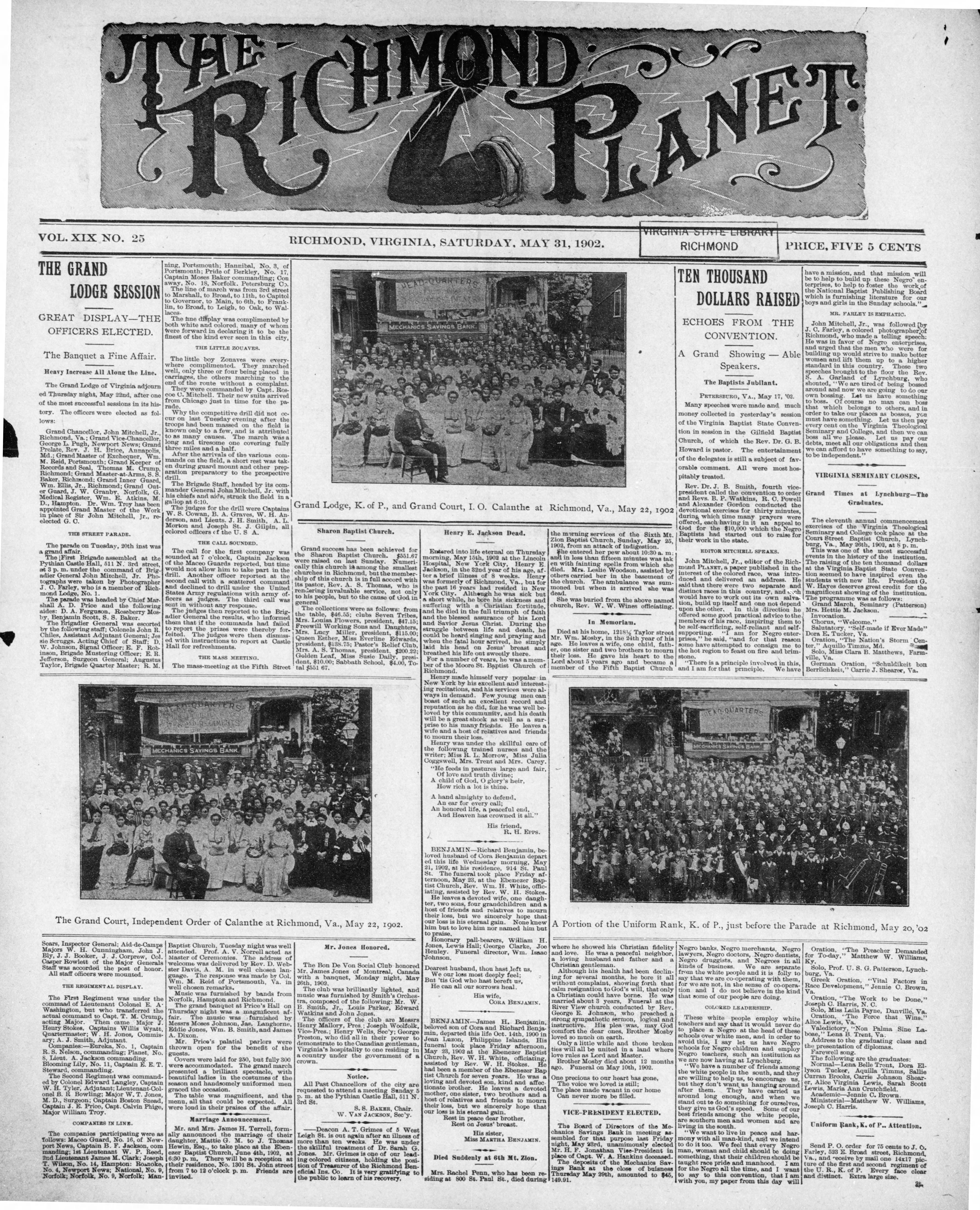
Richmond Planet on Saturday May 31, 1902.

Richmond's leading African American newspaper at the turn of the century was the Richmond Planet which ran from 1883 to 1996 and was edited by John Mitchel, Jr. from 1884 until his death in 1929.

Regional and county newspapers include the following:

- The Amelia Bulletin Monitor for Amelia County, Virginia
- Capital News Service at VCU for regional and national news
- The Chesterfield Observer for Chesterfield County, Virginia
- The Goochland Courier for Goochland County, Virginia
- The Goochland Gazette for Goochland County, Virginia
- The Henrico Citizen for Henrico County, Virginia
- The Hopewell News (defunct) for Hopewell, Virginia
- Petersburg Progress-Index for Petersburg, Virginia
- RVA Magazine
- Virginia Living is a glossy magazine published bi-monthly that covers Virginia events.

=== Student Operated ===
Many colleges and universities in Richmond have student operated new services including The Richard T. Robertson School of Media and Culture at Virginia Commonwealth University, VCU Student Media, VUU, and University of Richmond. Examples of student operated media include VCU's Commonwealth Times, VCU Capital News Service and VCU InSight,Ink, Amendment, Emanata, and Poictesme.

== Television ==
Richmond is served by several television stations.

=== Broadcast ===
Richmond's over-the-air television stations:

Digital	Repack	PSIP	Callsign	Licensed To	Primary Network(s) [on HD1 Channel]	Digital Subchannel(s)	Ownership	Website
25	23	6	WTVR	Richmond	CBS	6.2 - Antenna TV; 6.3 - Xtra News; 6.4 - Court TV; 6.5 - Ion Television; 6.6 - Newsy	E. W. Scripps Company	http://www.wtvr.com
22	28	8	WRIC	Petersburg	ABC	8.2 - Ion Television; 8.3 - GetTV; 8.4 - Laff	Nexstar	http://www.wric.com
12	10	12	WWBT	Richmond	NBC	12.2 - Me-TV; 12.3 - Circle; 12.4 - Court TV Mystery; 12.5 - Justice Network	Gray Television	https://www.nbc12.com
15	15	15	WUDW-LD	Richmond	BUZZR	15.2 - 24/7 infomercials 15.3 - 24/7 infomercials 15.4 - Shop LC; 15.5 - Soul of the South	HC2 Holdings	none
42	22	23	WCVE	Richmond	PBS	23.2 - VPM Create; 23.3 - WNVT MHz Worldview; 23.4 - PBS Kids	Commonwealth Public Broadcasting Corporation	http://www.vpm.org/tv
28	25	28	WWBK-LD	Richmond	3ABN	28.2 - 24/7 infomercials 28.3 - 24/7 infomercials 28.4 - unused	HC2 Holdings	none
30	30	30	WFWG-LD	Richmond	Azteca America	30.2 - Cozi TV; 30.3 - 24/7 infomercials 30.4 - 24/7 infomercials 30.5 - Cheddar	HC2 Holdings	none
26	24	35	WRLH	Richmond	Fox	35.2 - MyNetworkTV/TBD; 35.3 - Comet; 35.4 - Charge! 35.5 - dabl	Sinclair Broadcast Group	https://www.foxrichmond.com https://www.mytvrichmond.com
45	34	45	WZTD-LD	Richmond	Telemundo	45.2 - NBC Lx	NBCUniversal (Telemundo Stations Group)	
48**	36	48	WRID-LD	Richmond	Daystar	n/a	Word of God Fellowship (Daystar)	https://www.daystar.com
44	29	57	WCVW	Richmond	PBS	n/a	Commonwealth Public Broadcasting Corporation	http://www.vpm.org/tv
8	n/a	65	WUPV	Ashland	CW	65.2 - Bounce TV; 65.3 - GritTV; 65.4 - Laff	Gray Television	http://www.cwrichmond.tv

** As of August, 2019, this station is indicated as Silent on the FCC's broadcast database.

Repack refers to the impending reallocation of channel assignments following FCC Auctions 1001/1002, which is designed to sell unused TV spectrum to wireless service operators. Richmond-area stations will begin testing in January 2020, and will have to move to their new channels by March 13, 2020.

Primary station signals air on 2-3 channels per cable system (usually one in standard definition and 1–2 in high definition). Subchannels are cleared on cable systems through contractual agreements, and are generally in standard definition.

=== Cable ===
Comcast is the primary cable television provider for the Richmond area (Richmond city proper, Chesterfield, Henrico County) and the Tri-Cities (area includes Petersburg, Colonial Heights, Hopewell and the counties of Dinwiddie and Prince George). In the city and Henrico County, it is the successor to the franchise originally held by Continental Cablevision, then MediaOne, then AT&T Broadband, before Comcast acquired AT&T Broadband. In Chesterfield, it is the successor to the franchise originally held by Storer Cable. In the nearby Tri-Cities area, it is the successor to the franchise originally held by Sammons Communications, then Marcus Cable, then Tele-Media, then Adelphia, before Comcast acquired Adelphia.

Verizon now offers television through its fiber-optic system, FiOS TV, in Richmond City and Henrico and Chesterfield Counties, and is currently expanding its services farther into the outlying Richmond area.

== Radio ==
The metropolitan area is served by a variety of radio stations, serving a wide variety of musical and other interests.

=== AM ===
Several AM stations serve a variety of music, talk, and sports topics, including the following:

Frequency	Callsign	Licensed To	Nickname	Format	Owner	Web site
590	WLES	Bon Air	The Truth	Religious	Chesapeake-Portsmouth Broadcasting	Truth Richmond website
800	WSVS	Crewe	Virginia's Country Legend	Classic Country	Gee Communications	WSVS website
820	WJFN	Chester	820 The Answer	Conservative Talk	Disruptor Radio LLC	
910	WRNL	Richmond	910 the Fan and 105.1 FM	Sports radio	Audacy, Inc.	WRNL website
950; 1240	WXGI; WTPS	Richmond; Petersburg	ESPN Richmond	ESPN Radio	Urban One	WXGI website
990	WREJ	Richmond	Rejoice Radio	Gospel	Radio Richmond LLC	WREJ website
1140	WRVA	Richmond	Newsradio 1140 WRVA and 96.1 FM	News/Talk (50,000 watts)	Audacy, Inc.	WRVA website
1290	WDZY	Colonial Heights	AM1290 The Word	Religious	Wilkins Radio Network	Wilkins Radio Richmond website
1320; 1450	WBTL; WVNZ	Richmond; Sandston	Boomtown Richmond	Oldies	Mobile Radio Partners	Boomtown Richmond website
1340	WHAP	Hopewell	Fox Sports Radio 1340 and 96.9	Sports/Variety/Talk	Bruce Gee	WHAP website
1380	WBTK	Richmond	Radio Poder	Hispanic Religion	Mt. Rich Media	WBTK website
1430	WHAN	Ashland	The 'Mater	Adult Alternative / Community Radio	Fifth Estate	WHAN website
1480; 1540	WTOX; WULT	Glen Allen; Highland Springs	Ultra Richmond	Spanish music	Mobile Radio Partners	Ultra website
1590	WNRN	Richmond	Modern Rock, No Commercials	Modern Rock	Stu-Comm (Relay of WNRN-FM/Charlottesville)	WNRN-FM website
1620	WPQE514	n/a	Highway Advisory	Road Condition Reports; VDOT may be closing this system in early 2019.	Commonwealth Of Virginia	none

=== FM ===
On the FM dial, popular music stations include the following:

Frequency	Callsign	Licensed To	Nickname	Format	Owner	Web site
88.1	WRIH-FM	Richmond	American Family Radio	Religious	American Family	AFR Network website
88.5	WNRN-FM	Midlothian	Modern Rock, No Commercials	Modern Rock	Stu-Comm (Translator for WFTH-AM/Richmond, relaying WNRN-FM/Charlottesville)	WNRN-FM website
88.9	WCVE-FM	Richmond	VPM News & Talk	Public Radio	Commonwealth Public Broadcasting Corporation	Virginia Public Media website
89.7	WRIQ	Charles City	Radio IQ	Public Radio	Virginia Tech Foundation, Inc.	Radio IQ website
90.1	WARV-FM	Colonial Heights	Air1	Contemporary Christian	Educational Media Foundation	Air1 website
90.1	WDCE-FM	Richmond	90.1 FM	Student-run Alternative Music	University Of Richmond	WDCE-FM website
90.5; 102.5	WPER	Fredericksburg; Richmond	Virginia's Positive Hits	Christian and gospel	Positive Alternative Radio	PAR Network website
91.1	WHCE-FM	Highland Springs	Mix 91	Henrico County; Student-run Contemporary Music	County Of Henrico	n/a
91.3	WVST-FM	Petersburg	The Source	R&B/Urban/Jazz/Public affairs/Sports	Virginia State University	WVST-FM website
91.7	KAWZ	Lakeside	CSN International	Christian	Calvary Chapel of Twin Falls (Translator for KAWZ-FM/Twin Falls, ID)	CSN Network website
92.1; 104.1	WCDX-FM	Mechanicsville; Petersburg	iPower 92-1 and 104-1	Mainstream Urban	Urban One	WCDX-FM website
92.5	WVTF	Richmond	Radio IQ	NPR/BBC Talk	Virginia Tech Foundation (Translator for WVTF/Roanoke)	Radio IQ website
92.9; 101.7	WVNZ; WBTL	Highland Springs; Richmond	Boomtown Richmond	Oldies	Mobile Radio Partners (Translators for WVNZ/Highland Springs and WBTL/Richmond)	Boomtown Richmond website
93.1; 107.3	WWLB; WBBT-FM	Ettrick; Powhatan	VPM Music	Public Radio	Commonwealth Public Broadcasting Corporation	Virginia Public Media website
93.5	WBBC-FM	Blackstone	Bobcat Country	Country / Sports	Denbar Communications	WBBC-FM website
93.7	WCFC-LP	Richmond		Christian	Crusade for Christ Temple Church of God in Christ	CFC Network website
93.9	WKLV	Blackstone	Oldies 93.9	Oldies	Denbar Communications (Simulcast of WKLV-AM/Blackstone)	WKLV website
93.9	WRWK-LP	Midlothian	The Work FM	Community-Interest	Synergy Project, Inc	The Work FM website
94.1	WULT	Highland Springs	Ultra Richmond 94.1 FM/1540 AM	Spanish music	Mobile Radio Partners (Translator for WULT/Highland Springs)	Ultra website
94.5	WRVQ-FM	Richmond	Q94	Top 40/CHR	Audacy, Inc.	WRVQ-FM Website
94.9	WRVL	Richmond	The Journey	Christian	Liberty University (Translator for WRVL-FM/Lynchburg)	WRVL-FM website
95.3	WKHK-FM	Colonial Heights	K95	Country music	SummitMedia LLC	WKHK-FM website
96.1	WRVA	Richmond	Newsradio 1140 WRVA and 96.1 FM	News/Talk	Audacy, Inc.	WRVA website
96.5	WKLR-FM	Fort Lee	Classic Rock 96.5	Rock	SummitMedia LLC	WKLR-FM website
96.9	WWUZ-FM	Bowling Green	96-9 The Rock	Classic rock	Alpha Media	WWUZ-FM website
96.9	WHAP	Hopewell	Fox Sports Radio 1340 and 96.9	Sports/Variety/Talk	Bruce Gee (Translator for WHAP/Hopewell)	WHAP website
97.1	WSVS	Crewe	Virginia's Country Legend	Christian	Gee Communications (Translator for WSVS-AM/Crewe)	WSVS website
97.3	WRIR-LP	Richmond	Richmond Indie Radio	Specialty Music Programs; Community focused programming	Virginia Center For The Public Press	WRIR-LP website
98.1	WTVR-FM	Richmond	Mix 98.1	Adult Contemporary	Audacy, Inc.	WTVR-FM website
98.5	W253BI	Richmond	Big 98.5	Country	Audacy, Inc.	W253BI website
98.9; 100.3	WLFV; WKYV	Midlothian; Petersburg	K-LOVE	Contemporary Christian	Educational Media Foundation	K-LOVE Network website
99.3; 105.7	WKJM-FM; WKJS-FM	Petersburg; Richmond	105.7 & 99.3 Kiss FM	Urban Adult Contemporary	Urban One	Kiss FM website
99.5; 102.7	WXGI	Richmond; Petersburg	ESPN Richmond	ESPN Radio	Urban One; Translator for WXGI/Richmond	WXGI website
99.9	WYFJ-FM	Ashland	FM 100	Christian and gospel	BBN	BBN Network website
100.5	WJFN-FM	Goochland	Newstalk WJFN	Conservative Talk	MAGA Radio Network	WJFN website
100.9	WJSR	Lakeside	100.9 Jack FM	Adult Hits	SummitMedia LLC	WJSR-FM website
101.3	WREJ	Richmond	Rejoice Radio	Gospel	Radio Richmond LLC (Translator for WREJ/Richmond)	WREJ website
102.1	WRXL-FM	Richmond	XL102	Modern Rock	Audacy, Inc.	WRXL-FM website
102.9	WHAN	Ashland	The 'Mater	Adult Alternative / Community Radio	Fifth Estate (Translator for WHAN-AM/Ashland)	WHAN website
103.3	WDZY	Colonial Heights	AM1290 The Word	Religious	Wilkins Radio Network (Translator for WDZY/Colonial Heights)	Wilkins Radio Richmond website
103.7	WURV-FM	Richmond	103.7 PLAY	Hot Adult Contemporary	SummitMedia LLC	WURV-FM website
104.3	W282CA	Richmond	G104.3	Classic Hip-Hop	SummitMedia LLC	W282CA website
104.7	WPZZ-FM	Crewe	Praise 104.7	Urban Gospel	Urban One	WPZZ-FM website
105.1	WRNL	Richmond	910 the Fan and 105.1 FM	Sports radio	Audacy, Inc. (Translator for WRNL-AM/Richmond)	WRNL website
105.3	WQCN-LP	Richmond	The Choice	Gospel	Faith & Love Fellowship Church	WQCN-LP Facebook
106.1	W291CL	Richmond	Sports 106.1	CBS Sports Radio	SummitMedia LLC	W291CL website
106.5	WBTJ-FM	Richmond	106.5 The Beat	Mainstream Urban	Audacy, Inc.	WBTJ-FM website
106.9	WAFX-FM	Suffolk	106.9 The Fox	Classic Rock	Saga	WAFX-FM website
107.9	WLES	Richmond	The Truth	Religious	Delmarva Educational Association (Translator for WLES/Bon Air)	WLES website

=== HD Radio ===
Frequency	Callsign	HD1	HD2	HD3
88.9	WCVE-FM	WCVE News & Talk (WCVE-FM)	WCVE Music (WWLB/WBBT-FM)	not used
92.1	WCDX-FM	iPower 92-1 and 104-1 (WCDX-FM)	ESPN Richmond (WXGI)	not used
94.5	WRVQ-FM	Q94 (WRVQ-FM)	910 the Fan (WRNL)	not used
95.3	WKHK-FM	K95 (WKHK-FM)	G104.3 (W282CA)	not used
96.5	WKLR-FM	Classic Rock 96.5 (WKLR-FM)	not used	not used
98.1	WTVR-FM	Mix 98.1 (WTVR-FM)	Newsradio 1140 WRVA and 96.1 FM (WRVA)	not used
100.9	WJSR	100.9 Jack FM (WJSR)	not used	not used
102.1	WRXL-FM	XL102 (WRXL-FM)	Big 98.5 (W253BI)	The Journey (relay of WRVL/Lynchburg)
103.7	WURV-FM	103.7 Play (WURV-FM)	Sports 106.5 (W291CL)	Radio IQ (W233AZ)
106.5	WBTJ-FM	106.5 the Beat (WBTJ-FM)	Smooth Jazz 24/7	Positive Hits Radio (WPIR)

== Media corporations ==
Commercial radio ownership in Richmond is dominated by three companies:

- Entercom (WRVA-AM, WRVQ, WTVR-FM, WBTJ, WRXL, WRNL-AM)
- SummitMedia LLC (WKLR, WMXB, WJSR, WKHK)
- Urban One (WCDX, WKJS, WKJX, WPZZ, WTPS-AM)

Commonwealth Public Broadcasting Corporation is the owner of several stations in Richmond (WCVE-TV, WCVE-FM, WWLB-FM, WBBT-FM, WCVW-TV), along with translators in Charlottesville, and another station in Northern Virginia, and is headquartered in Richmond.

== Communication schools ==
Richmond is home to the VCU School of Mass Communications, which was founded in 1978 and offers bachelor's and master's degrees in journalism, advertising and public relations. It is accredited by the Accrediting Council on Education in Journalism and Mass Communication (AEJMC). The school houses Capital News Service, VCU InSight, and the VCU Create-A-thon.

== See also ==
- Virginia media
  - List of newspapers in Virginia
  - List of radio stations in Virginia
  - List of television stations in Virginia
  - Media of cities in Virginia: Chesapeake, Hampton, Newport News, Norfolk, Roanoke, Virginia Beach
