= WRIQ =

Radio station in Charles City, Virginia

- Charles City, Virginia; United States
- Broadcast area: Richmond; Petersburg
- Frequency: 89.7 MHz

Programming
- Format: news/talk
- Network: Radio IQ
- Affiliations: BBC World Service; National Public Radio; Public Radio Exchange

Ownership
- Owner: Virginia Polytechnic Institute and State University; (Virginia Tech Foundation)
- Sister stations: WISE-FM; WVTF; WWVT-FM

History
- First air date: 2000
- Former call signs: WAUQ (1997–2015); WLRJ (2015–2017); WNVU (2017–2020)
- Call sign meaning: Richmond IQ

Technical information
- Licensing authority: FCC
- Facility ID: 82970
- Class: B
- ERP: 27,000 Watts
- HAAT: 69.6 meters (228 ft)
- Transmitter coordinates: 37°31′40.50″N 77°22′46.90″W

Links
- Public license information: Public file; LMS
- Website: www.wvtf.org

WRIQ (89.7 MHz), is an NPR member radio station licensed to Charles City, Virginia, and serving the Richmond–Petersburg area. WRIQ is part of the Radio IQ network, simulcasting the NPR news and talk programming of flagship WVTF. WRIQ is owned by Virginia Polytechnic Institute and State University (Virginia Tech) through its fundraising arm, the Virginia Tech Foundation.

== History ==
American Family Association launched the station as WAUQ in 2000, relaying its American Family Radio network which featured a mix of Christian teaching and Contemporary Christian music.

On August 18, 2015, Educational Media Foundation purchased the station from the American Family Association for $1.25 million. EMF began relaying its K-Love network on the station, and changed the station's call letters to WLRJ.

On April 17, 2017, WLRJ began stunting with a continuously repeating informational loop informing listeners that K-Love in Richmond had moved, and directing listeners to EMF's recently acquired stations on 98.9 FM (WLFV) and 100.3 FM (WKYV).

On April 26, 2017, WLRJ began relaying EMF's Radio Nueva Vida network. The station changed its call sign to WNVU on December 22, 2017.

On October 10, 2019, EMF reached a deal to sell WNVU to the Virginia Tech Foundation for $2.15 million. EMF had floated Virginia Tech intended to make WNVU part of its main NPR news and talk service, Radio IQ, as part of its effort to expand its reach outside its base in southwestern Virginia. The sale closed on December 27, 2019, and the station began simulcasting Radio IQ programming on January 15, 2020. That same day, the call sign WRIQ was moved from a co-owned Radio IQ station in Lexington, Virginia, which became WIQR.

Since 2009, WVTF had aired its programming on a low-powered translator at 92.5 FM, which is fed by the third HD Radio subchannel of commercial radio station WURV. The purchase of WRIQ gave WVTF a full-powered signal in the Richmond area for the first time, giving much of the area an alternative source for NPR programming alongside Richmond's established NPR member, WCVE-FM. WRIQ operates at only 27,000 watts from a short (by modern broadcasting standards) 228-foot tower east of Richmond, resulting in Petersburg and other close-in suburbs only getting a Grade B signal. Nonetheless, with the addition of WRIQ, the Radio IQ network now provided at least secondary coverage from Wise in the southwestern corner of the Commonwealth to the fringes of Hampton Roads.

== See also ==
- WVTF — Radio IQ flagship
