= VPM =

VPM may refer to:

- Varying Permeability Model
- Vel Phillips Memorial High School, a public high school in Madison, Wisconsin
- Ventral posteromedial nucleus, a nucleus of the thalamus; part of the brain.
- Virginia Payload Module, a weapon system planned for Block 5 of the US Navy's Virginia-class submarine
- Volcanic passive margin
- VPM Media Corporation
- VPM SnC, an Italian autogyro company, renamed Magni Gyro in 1996
- Vranken Pommery Monopole

== Radio stations ==
- VPM-FM, a radio station in Belize
- Three related public radio stations in Virginia
  - WBBT-FM, branded as VPM Music
  - WWLB, branded as VPM Music
  - WCVE-FM, branded as VPM News
