= WDYL =

WDYL may refer to:

- WDYL (search engine), a search engine from Google
- WDYL-LD, a low-power television station (channel 15, virtual 28) licensed to serve Louisville, Kentucky, United States
- WDYL, former name of the American radio station WJSR
