= WPIR =

WPIR may refer to:

- WPIR (FM), a radio station (89.9 FM) licensed to serve Culpeper, Virginia, United States
- WPER (FM), a radio station (90.5 FM) licensed to serve Fredericksburg, Virginia, which held the call sign WPIR in 2018
- WJYJ, a radio station (88.1 FM) licensed to serve Hickory, North Carolina, United States, which held the call sign WPIR from 1997 to 2018
