= WPER =

WPER may refer to:

- WPER (FM), a radio station (90.5 FM) licensed to serve Fredericksburg, Virginia, United States
- WPIR (FM), a radio station (89.9 FM) licensed to serve Culpeper, Virginia, which held the call sign WPER from 1996 to 2018
