= WSKO =

WSKO may refer to:

- WSKO (AM), "The Score", a sports radio station (1260 AM) licensed to Syracuse, New York, United States

Other radio stations that previously used the same call letters include:

- WEAN-FM, a radio station (99.7 FM) licensed to Wakefield-Peacedale, Rhode Island, United States, which used the call sign WSKO-FM from 2002 until 2008
- WPRV, a radio station (790 AM) licensed to Providence, Rhode Island, United States, which used the call sign WSKO from 1997 until 2008
- WBOP, a radio station (95.5 FM) licensed to Buffalo Gap, Virginia, United States, which used the call sign WSKO from 1989 until 1995

WSKO may also refer to:

- World Shorinji Kempo Organization, the international governing body of the martial art Shorinji Kempo.
