= WEHC =

Public radio station in Emory, Virginia

- Emory, Virginia; United States
- Broadcast area: Abingdon, Virginia; Marion, Virginia
- Frequency: 90.7 MHz
- Branding: 90.7 WEHC

Programming
- Format: Public radio
- Affiliations: BBC World Service; National Public Radio; Radio IQ

Ownership
- Owner: Emory and Henry University

History
- First air date: November 15, 1994
- Call sign meaning: Emory and Henry College

Technical information
- Licensing authority: FCC
- Facility ID: 19527
- Class: C3
- ERP: 8,700 watts
- HAAT: 114 meters (374 ft)
- Transmitter coordinates: 36°46′1.0″N 81°50′18.0″W

Links
- Public license information: Public file; LMS
- Webcast: Listen live
- Website: ehc.edu/wehc

WEHC is a Public Radio-formatted broadcast radio station licensed to Emory, Virginia, serving the Abingdon/Marion area. WEHC is owned and operated by Emory and Henry University.

== History ==
The original incarnation of WEHC was a 100-watt AM station, which signed on October 24, 1929 on 1370 kHz. The station was programmed mostly by students and represented to the Federal Radio Commission by faculty member W. Byron Brown. After three years of operation, the Great Depression prompted the college to sell to Brown for $5,000 (equivalent to $117,988 in 2025) in the fall of 1932. The station went off the air that December as Brown moved the physical facilities to Charlottesville, Virginia, where it is still in operation as WCHV.

The current WEHC, which is legally unrelated to the original station, was founded in 1992. The original station kept the WEHC callsign until 1935, but it was never reused and remained available for the new station.

=== New transmitter and tower ===
WEHC worked with US Representative Rick Boucher (D-VA) to raise the $187,932 needed to build a brand new 199 foot tower and increase the station's power from 500 watts to nearly 10,000. On October 27, 2009, WEHC turned on their new transmitter, dramatically increasing their power from 500 to 8,700 watts.

== Programming ==
WEHC is a mix of national, international, and local programming. During the afternoon and evening hours, WEHC airs locally produced music and public affairs programs. Through an arrangement with Roanoke station WVTF, WEHC simulcasts Radio IQ programs, including BBC World Service news, Morning Edition, All Things Considered, and 1A. As of November 12, 2022, WEHC also airs its entire line of local programs on Wise, Virginia station WISE-FM, which is owned by WVTF's parent company the Virginia Tech Foundation.

== Network stations ==
WEHC's programming is simulcast on the full power WISE-FM and four low-power translator stations to widen its broadcast area. All stations are owned by the Virginia Tech Foundation.

| Call sign | Frequency | City of license | ERP W | Class | FCC info |
|---|---|---|---|---|---|
| WISE-FM | 90.5 FM | Wise, Virginia | 220 | A | FCC (WISE-FM) |
| W211BF | 90.1 FM | Big Stone Gap, Virginia | 8 | D | FCC (W211BF) |
| W212BP | 90.3 FM | Clintwood, Virginia | 1 | D | FCC (W212BP) |
| W217BF | 91.3 FM | Pound, Virginia | 1 | D | FCC (W217BF) |
| W219CJ | 91.7 FM | Norton, Virginia | 50 | D | FCC (W219CJ) |
