= The Richmonder =

Richmond, Virginia online local news

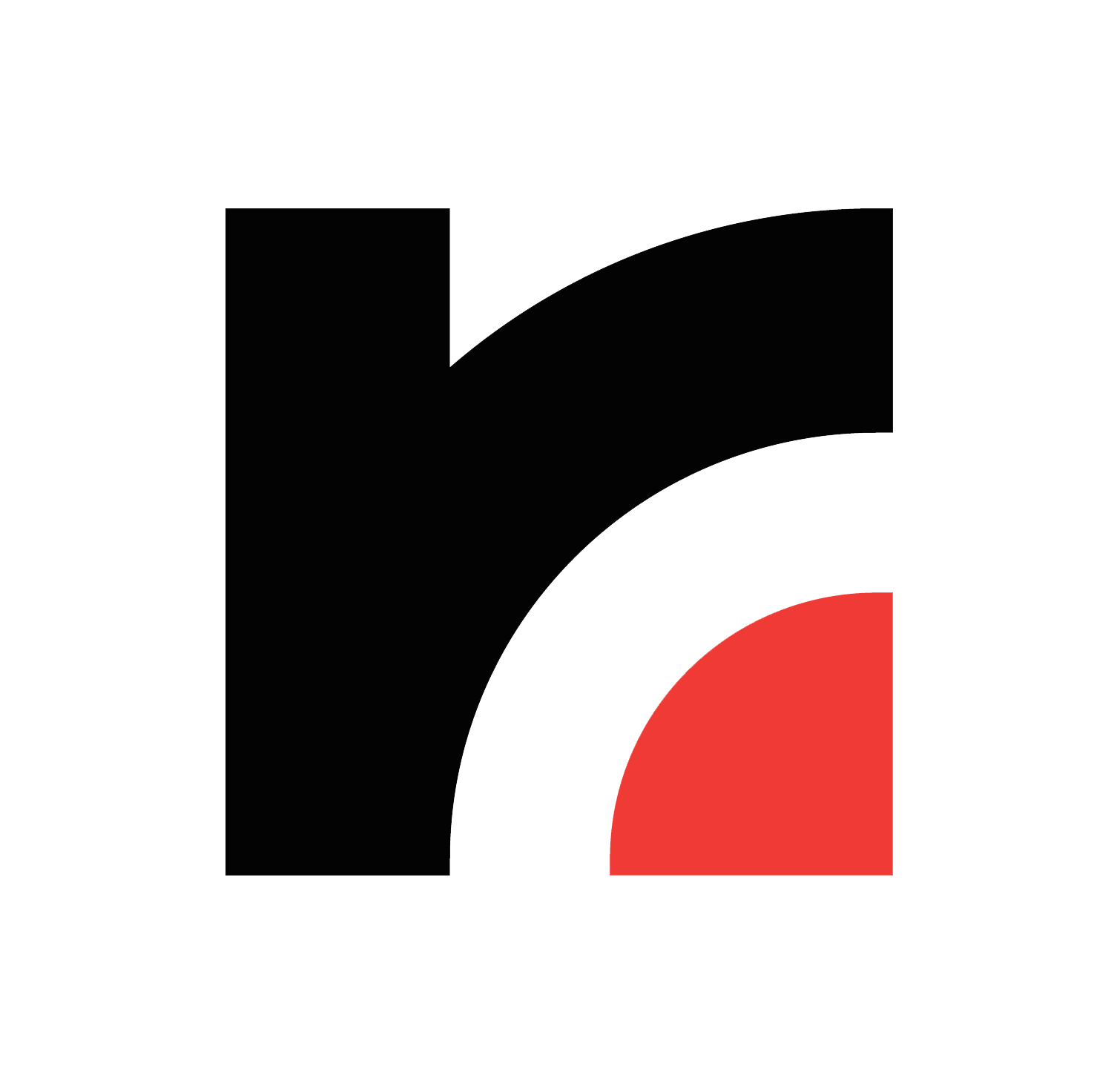
- Format: Online
- Founder: Michael Phillips
- Editor: Michael Phillips
- Staff writers: Victoria A. Ifatusin, Sarah Vogelsong, Graham Moomaw
- Founded: 2024
- City: Richmond, Virginia
- Website: https://www.richmonder.org

The Richmonder is a local online-only, payment-free, subscription-supported news organization in Richmond, Virginia.

== History ==
The site was created by founding editor Michael Philips after he was cut from his job at the Richmond Times-Dispatch in July 2023. His initial role there was the coverage of sports, but grew to involve leadership of teams covering other subjects as well; he worked his way up to senior editor before being laid off.

When he was laid off, he found that no one was regularly sending reporters to local government meetings—the Times-Dispatch had stopped doing so—and decided to create an organization that would do that itself. Philips was inspired by Cardinal News, which was founded in response to similar cuts at The Roanoke Times; he said that they provided a lot of guidance as he was starting up. However, Phillips stated that getting reporters Graham Moomaw and Sarah Vogelsong on the team were the most important factors to the site's success. Other laid-off reporters and editors at traditional newspapers had also gone on to new roles, including working as reporters at the Virginia Mercury and VPM; and founded sites of their own, such as Axios Richmond and a digital weather consulting firm launched by Sean Sublette. Sublette planned to contribute to The Richmonder's weather coverage.

As with Cardinal News, the organization is a nonprofit that does not paywall its reporting.

The site was launched on September 9, 2024. Their initial goal was to focus on City Council and School Board meetings; they said that it was important to cover those matters, but that there was a lack of existing coverage. However, a reporter for the RIchmond Times-Dispatch took issue with this assertion, posting on X that the paper did indeed send reporters to public meetings and citing content that had been produced from those meetings.

At the time of the site's launch, the Richmond mayoral, City Council, and school board elections were getting into full swing.

To help the organization get started, David Poole, founder of the Virginia Public Access Project, came on as business manager.

The goal for the site is to eventually cover the surrounding counties with the same watchdog-style journalism as they do the central city.
