= WFFC =

WFFC may refer to:

- WFFC-LD, a low-power television station (channel 17) licensed to serve Midland, Michigan, United States
- WWVT-FM, a radio station (89.9 FM) licensed to serve Ferrum, Virginia, United States, which held the call sign WFFC from 1987 to 2017
- World Fly Fishing Championships
- West Finland Film Commission
