= WNVU =

WNVU may refer to:

- WNVU (FM), a radio station (93.5 FM) licensed to serve New Rochelle, New York, United States
- WRIQ, a radio station (89.7 FM) licensed to serve Charles City, Virginia, United States, which held the call sign WNVU from 2017 to 2020
- WPGR (AM), a radio station (1510 AM) licensed to serve Monroeville, Pennsylvania, United States, which held the call sign WNVU from 1986 to 1988
