= WCVE =

WCVE may refer to:

- WCVE-FM, a radio station (88.9 FM) licensed to serve Richmond, Virginia, United States
- WCVE-TV, a television station (channel 22, virtual 23) licensed to serve Richmond, Virginia
