= WISE-FM =

- Wise, Virginia; United States
- Broadcast area: Norton, Virginia; Coeburn, Virginia; Clintwood, Virginia
- Frequency: 90.5 MHz (HD Radio)
- Branding: Radio IQ

Programming
- Format: Public radio
- Subchannels: HD2: WVTF Music (classical music)
- Affiliations: American Public Media; National Public Radio

Ownership
- Owner: Virginia Polytechnic Institute and State University; (Virginia Tech Foundation, Inc.)

History
- First air date: August 1, 1999
- Former call signs: WCVC-FM (1997–1999)
- Call sign meaning: Wise, Virginia

Technical information
- Licensing authority: FCC
- Facility ID: 85287
- Class: A
- ERP: 220 watts
- HAAT: 204 meters (669 ft)
- Transmitter coordinates: 36°57′39.4″N 82°30′54.6″W
- Translator: § Translators

Links
- Public license information: Public file; LMS
- Webcast: Listen live
- Website: www.wvtf.org

WISE-FM is a public radio station licensed to Wise, Virginia, serving Norton, Coeburn and Clintwood in Virginia. WISE-FM is owned and operated by Virginia Polytechnic Institute and State University. The station rebroadcasts the public radio programming of Emory and Henry College radio station WEHC full-time. It also broadcasts in HD Radio; HD1 rebroadcasts the analog signal while HD2 is a feed of WVTF Music.

WISE-FM is one of three stations whose call signs spell out their city of license; the others are WACO-FM and WARE.

== Programming ==
WISE-FM and its translators were previously full-time repeaters of Virginia Tech's Radio IQ news and public affairs network, based at WVTF in Roanoke. Effective November 12, 2022, the Virginia Tech Foundation and Emory and Henry College entered into a deal whereby WISE-FM became a repeater of the college's WEHC, based in Emory. WEHC also carries Radio IQ for part of the day, but breaks from the network in afternoons and evenings (1–4 p.m. and 6 p.m. to midnight) to air its own locally-focused talk, music, and sports programming.

== Translators ==
In addition to the main station, WISE-FM is relayed by FM translators to widen its broadcast area.

Call sign	Frequency	City of license	FID	ERP (W)	HAAT	Class	FCC info
W211BF	90.1 FM	Big Stone Gap, Virginia	92702	8	341.3 m (1,120 ft)	D	LMS
W212BP	90.3 FM	Clintwood, Virginia	121853	1	128.4 m (421 ft)	D	LMS
W217BF	91.3 FM	Pound, Virginia	121793	1	332.9 m (1,092 ft)	D	LMS
W219CJ	91.7 FM	Norton, Virginia	92894	50	53 m (174 ft)	D	LMS

== See also ==
- WVTF — Radio IQ flagship
- WWVT-FM — WVTF Music flagship
