= WRAA =

- Luray, Virginia; United States
- Broadcast area: Luray, Virginia; Page County, Virginia
- Frequency: 1330 kHz
- Branding: Rascal 1330

Programming
- Format: Classic country

Ownership
- Owner: Baker Family Stations; (Positive Alternative Radio, Inc.)
- Sister stations: WMXH-FM

History
- First air date: 1962
- Call sign meaning: Luray

Technical information
- Licensing authority: FCC
- Facility ID: 12572
- Class: D
- Power: 1,100 watts (day); 26 watts (night)
- Transmitter coordinates: 38°39′34.0″N 78°29′28.0″W

Links
- Public license information: Public file; LMS

WRAA is a Classic Country formatted broadcast radio station licensed to Luray, Virginia, serving Luray and Page County, Virginia. WRAA is owned and operated by Baker Family Stations, through licensee Positive Alternative Radio, Inc.

== Sold ==
WRAA and sister station WMXH-FM were sold to Hayden Hamilton Media Strategies for $325,000 on June 4, 2014. The sale was closed on October 1, 2014. The two stations were sold again effective December 19, 2019, this time to Baker Family Stations for $165,000.
