= WVRI =

- Clifton Forge, Virginia; United States
- Broadcast area: Alleghany County, Virginia
- Frequency: 90.9 MHz
- Branding: The Journey

Programming
- Format: Contemporary Christian

Ownership
- Owner: Liberty University

History
- First air date: 2011
- Former call signs: KCFF (2009–2009)

Technical information
- Licensing authority: FCC
- Facility ID: 177072
- Class: B1
- Power: 1,000 watts
- HAAT: 561 meters (1,841 ft)
- Transmitter coordinates: 37°46′59.0″N 80°0′0.0″W

Links
- Public license information: Public file; LMS
- Webcast: Listen live
- Website: www.liberty.edu/thejourney

WVRI (90.9 FM) is a non-commercial radio station licensed to Clifton Forge, Virginia, United States, and serving Alleghany County, Virginia. It is owned by Liberty University and it simulcasts a Christian Contemporary format, known as "The Journey," from parent station WRVL in Lynchburg. WVRI's transmitter is sited off Airport Road in Hot Springs.

== History ==
This station received its original construction permit from the Federal Communications Commission on May 23, 2008. Before it went on the air, it was given the call sign KCFF by the FCC on February 6, 2009. This assignment, likely by accident, made KCFF the only call sign beginning with a "K" in the Commonwealth of Virginia and one of only a handful east of the Mississippi River. On October 15, 2009, KCFF became WVRI, under new ownership.

The station's construction permit was originally owned by Ron Elmore Ministries, Inc., but never made it to the airwaves. The construction permit and station license were sold to Liberty University in October 2009. It became a satellite broadcasting outlet for flagship station WRVL, when it signed on the air in 2011.
