= WVTF =

Public radio station in Roanoke, Virginia

- Roanoke, Virginia; United States
- Broadcast area: Southwest Virginia and Central Virginia
- Frequency: 89.1 MHz (HD Radio)
- Branding: Radio IQ

Programming
- Format: Public radio/talk
- Subchannels: HD2: Classical/jazz (WWVT-FM); HD3: CCM (WRVL)
- Affiliations: APM; BBC World Service; NPR; PRX

Ownership
- Owner: Virginia Polytechnic Institute and State University; (Virginia Tech Foundation)
- Sister stations: WVTF Music

History
- First air date: August 1, 1973
- Former call signs: WVWR-FM (1973–1982)
- Former frequencies: 90.1 MHz (1973–1975)
- Call sign meaning: Virginia Tech Foundation

Technical information
- Licensing authority: FCC
- Facility ID: 70338
- Class: C
- ERP: 100,000 watts
- HAAT: 600 meters (2,000 ft)
- Transmitter coordinates: 37°11′56.0″N 80°09′2.0″W
- Translator: See § Low power translators

Links
- Public license information: Public file; LMS
- Webcast: Listen live
- Website: wvtf.org

WVTF (89.1 FM) is a non-commercial educational radio station licensed to serve Roanoke, Virginia, featuring a public radio format branded "Radio IQ". Owned by Virginia Polytechnic Institute and State University (Virginia Tech) through its fundraising arm, the Virginia Tech Foundation, the station carries programming from NPR, the Public Radio Exchange, American Public Media and the BBC World Service. WVTF is a listener-supported station, holding periodic fundraisers on the air. The studios and offices are inside the WVTF Public Radio Broadcast Center on Kingsbury Lane in Roanoke, with satellite studios inside Suite C102 on West Water Street in Charlottesville.

WVTF has an effective radiated power (ERP) of 100,000 watts, the maximum for most FM radio stations in the U.S. The transmitter is on Poor Mountain, off Media Way in Bent Mountain, Virginia. WVTF broadcasts using HD Radio technology. The station's HD-2 digital subchannel simulcasts the "WVTF Music" format from co-owned 89.9 WWVT-FM in Ferrum, Virginia, playing classical music and jazz. The HD-3 subchannel carries Christian Contemporary music from WRVL Lynchburg, Virginia. In addition to WVTF, Radio IQ is heard on 16 rebroadcasters and FM translators around Virginia. The combined footprint of the full-power stations reaches from Southwest Virginia to the fringes of Hampton Roads.

== History ==
=== WVWR-FM ===
The station signed on the air on August 1, 1973, as WVWR-FM (Virginia Western Radio) licensed to Virginia Western Community College in Roanoke. It was used primarily to air college telecourses and give broadcasting students a chance to hone their skills.

In 1975, WVWR-FM's transmitter was moved from Fishburn Hall on the VWCC campus to Poor Mountain, where most of Roanoke's major radio and television stations have their transmitters. The power also was increased from 4,100 watts to 100,000 watts. The power boost tripled its coverage area, giving it at least secondary coverage in much of central and southwest Virginia, southern West Virginia and northern North Carolina. In 1979, WVWR-FM began the Radio Reading Service on its subcarrier frequency.

=== Virginia Tech Foundation ===
In 1981, state officials decided that no state agency should directly own a radio station, and Virginia Western was forced to sell. The Virginia Tech Foundation, financially independent of Virginia Tech but controlled by school leadership, expressed interest in buying the station. It not only wanted to preserve public radio in the region, but saw WVWR as a way to increase Virginia Tech's ties to Roanoke. The foundation formally took control in 1982 and initially applied for the call sign WRVT before settling on WVTF. Over the next decade, WVTF built translator after translator to better serve its mostly mountainous coverage area.

From 1980 to 2017, WVTF and its repeaters maintained a schedule typical of full-service public radio stations, with NPR news in drive times, classical music during the day and overnight, and various special music and talk programming on nights and weekends.

=== Rebranding as Radio IQ ===
In 2003, WVTF launched Radio IQ in order to provide a secondary schedule consisting only of news/talk programming, including retransmission of the BBC World Service overnight. Radio IQ broadcast over its own network of stations, consisting of extra signals that were overlapped by WVTF's network, as well as those in areas such as Richmond which receive a music and news schedule from another NPR member station. Radio IQ began with WWVT (1260 AM, Christiansburg). The service quickly expanded to WFFC (89.9 FM, Ferrum), the former Ferrum College student radio station, and WVTW (88.5 FM), an extra station in Charlottesville. Radio IQ signed on WRIQ in Lexington in 2011 and purchased WQIQ near Fredericksburg in 2013.

On July 10, 2017, Radio IQ became WVTF's main service, and the station itself rebranded from "WVTF Public Radio" to "Radio IQ". Three of the five existing Radio IQ stations (WVTW, WQIQ, and WRIQ) merged with WVTF and its network (WVTR, WVTU, and WISE-FM) to place the news and talk schedule on as many full-powered signals as possible. A new companion service, WVTF Music, launched on the remaining stations (WWVT and WFFC, later renamed WWVT-FM) and HD2 subchannels of the new combined Radio IQ network. Low-powered translators of the previous WVTF and Radio IQ networks were divided between the two services. WVTF Music took over all music programming, including daily blocks of classical music, specialty local programs, and Live From Here.

=== WRIQ Richmond ===
Radio IQ's programming had been heard in portions of the Greater Richmond Region on low-powered translator W223AZ (92.5 FM) since 2009. In October 2019, WVTF purchased WNVU (89.7 FM) in nearby Charles City, Virginia. That station began simulcasting Radio IQ programming in January 2020 under the new call letters WRIQ.

WRIQ brings a full-powered Radio IQ signal to Richmond for the first time. That puts it in direct competition with Richmond-based NPR member WCVE-FM. WCVE has its own network of rebroadcasters known as the VPM News Service.

== Stations ==
=== Full power stations ===
All stations broadcast using HD Radio technology, with "WVTF Music" on its HD2 subchannel.

Call sign	Frequency	City of license	ERP (W)	Class	FCC info
WIQR	88.7 FM	Lexington, Virginia	3,900	A	FCC (WIQR)
WRIQ	89.7 FM	Charles City, Virginia	27,000	B1	FCC (WRIQ)
WQIQ	88.3 FM	Spotsylvania, Virginia	3,500	A	FCC (WQIQ)
WVTF (Note: Radio IQ flagship station)	89.1 FM	Roanoke, Virginia	100,000	C	FCC (WVTF)
WVTR	91.9 FM	Marion, Virginia	4,500	C2	FCC (WVTR)
WVTU	89.3 FM	Charlottesville, Virginia (west)	195	B1	FCC (WVTU)
WVTW	88.5 FM	Charlottesville, Virginia (city)	1,000	B1	FCC (WVTW)

Notes:

The following stations broadcast Radio IQ on a part-time basis:

Call sign	Frequency	City of license	ERP (W)	Class	FCC info	Broadcast times
WEHC	90.7 FM	Emory, Virginia	8,700	C3	FCC (WEHC)	12 a.m. to 1 p.m. daily; 4 p.m. to 6 p.m. weekdays
WISE-FM	90.5 FM	Wise, Virginia	220	A	FCC (WISE-FM)	12 a.m. to 1 p.m. daily; 4 p.m. to 6 p.m. weekdays
WLUR	91.5 FM	Lexington, Virginia	175	A	FCC (WLUR)	12 a.m. to 1 p.m. daily; various additional timeslots

=== Translators ===
In addition to the main stations, Radio IQ is relayed by an additional 6 translators to widen its broadcast area. It can also be heard on WURV-HD3 in Richmond (which also feeds translator W223AZ).

Call sign	Frequency	City of license	FID	ERP (W)	Class	FCC info	Notes
W212BP	90.3 FM	Clintwood, Virginia	121853	1	D	LMS	Relays WISE-FM
W217BF	91.3 FM	Pound, Virginia	121793	1	D	LMS	Relays WISE-FM
W219CJ	91.7 FM	Norton, Virginia	92894	50	D	LMS	Relays WISE-FM
W223AZ	92.5 FM	Richmond, Virginia	157136	220	D	LMS	Relays WURV-HD3
W230BD	93.9 FM	Lovingston, Virginia	157729	10	D	LMS	Relays WVTF
W235BT	94.9 FM	Fredericksburg, Virginia	153337	80	D	LMS	Relays WQIQ
