= WWVT-FM =

Public radio station in Ferrum, Virginia

WWVT-FM and WWVT

WWVT-FM: Ferrum, Virginia; WWVT: Christiansburg, Virginia; United States
- Broadcast area: WWVT-FM: Southside Virginia; WWVT: Blacksburg-Christiansburg-Radford, Virginia
- Frequencies: WWVT-FM: 89.9 MHz; WWVT: 1260 kHz
- Branding: WVTF Music

Programming
- Format: Classical music
- Affiliations: NPR

Ownership
- Owner: Virginia Polytechnic Institute and State University; (Virginia Tech Foundation, Inc.)
- Sister stations: WVTF, WISE-FM

History
- First air date: WWVT-FM: January 1989; WWVT: November 21, 1954
- Former call signs: WWVT-FM: WFFC (1987–2017); WWVT: WBCR (1954–1966); WJJJ (1966–1995); WNNI (1995–1998)

Technical information
- Licensing authority: FCC
- Facility ID: WWVT-FM: 21417; WWVT: 48622
- Class: WWVT-FM: A; WWVT: D
- Power: WWVT: 5,000 watts (day); 25 watts (night)
- ERP: WWVT-FM: 1,100 watts
- HAAT: WWVT-FM: 207 meters (679 ft)
- Transmitter coordinates: WWVT-FM: 36°54′50.0″N 79°57′7.0″W; WWVT: 37°9′14.4″N 80°30′25.2″W
- Translator(s): See § Low-powered translators

Links
- Public license information: WWVT-FM: Public file; LMS; WWVT: Public file; LMS
- Webcast: Listen live
- Website: www.wvtf.org

WWVT (1260 AM) and WWVT-FM (89.9 FM) are a pair of non-commercial radio stations serving Southside Virginia: WWVT is licensed to Christiansburg, Virginia, United States, and WWVT-FM is licensed to Ferrum, Virginia, United States. They broadcast a classical music format and are owned and operated by Virginia Polytechnic Institute and State University. WWVT-FM is the flagship of WVTF Music, a companion service to WVTF, Southwestern Virginia's NPR member news and information station. WWVT-AM-FM have their studios at WVTF's facility inside the WVTF Public Radio Broadcast Center on Kingsbury Lane in Roanoke.

WWVT-FM's transmitter is sited on Waidsboro Road in Ferrum, while WWVT's transmitter is sited on Walton Road at Caboose Road in Radford. Programming is also heard on a series of rebroadcasters and FM translators around Southwest Virginia.

== History ==
=== WWVT-FM 89.9 ===
The station signed on the air in January 1989. The original call sign was WFFC, the student station of Ferrum College. Its power at the time was only 100 watts.

In 2003, the Virginia Tech Foundation launched a secondary all-news and talk service, Radio IQ, on WWVT (1260 AM in Christiansburg). This schedule contrasted with WVTF's full-service schedule of music and news. As WWVT was only licensed to broadcast during the day at the time, WFFC joined Radio IQ in order to give it a 24-hour signal. The Virginia Tech Foundation also intended to have WFFC feed Radio IQ to extra FM translators that it owned. Since FCC rules prevent a station from feeding translators via microwave that are not co-owned, Ferrum sold WFFC to the foundation in November of that year.

This arrangement lasted until July 10, 2017, when Radio IQ became the Virginia Tech Foundation's primary service and moved to WVTF's more powerful signal and repeater network. As WVTF covers WFFC's entire broadcast area, it dropped Radio IQ to become the flagship of WVTF Music. The station changed its call sign to the current WWVT-FM in the same month. Due to the relatively modest coverage areas of the WWVT stations and their translators, WVTF Music is simulcast on the second HD Radio channels of all full-power Radio IQ stations except WRIQ in Richmond.

=== WWVT 1260 AM ===
AM 1260 signed on in October 1954. Its original call sign was WBCR and it was a daytimer, required to leave the air at night. It was later known as "Triple J" WJJJ. It competed in the 1960s and 1970s with Virginia Tech's student radio station, WUVT, for the local Top 40 market.

The station became WNNI in 1995. Bocephus Broadcasting purchased eight stations in the Blacksburg-Christiansburg market in 1997, after which it donated WNNI to the Virginia Tech Foundation.

In 2003, Virginia Tech launched the original incarnation of Radio IQ on the rechristened WWVT. WWVT was originally a daytimer that was required to go off the air at sunset to prevent interference to WCHV and WKXR on the same channel. After more than 50 years of daytime-only operation, WWVT added 25 watts of night power in 2005.

WWVT left Radio IQ and joined the WVTF Music network in 2017, in order to take advantage of its Blacksburg-based FM translator W238BN (95.5 FM).

== Programming ==
Much of the network's weekday programming is classical music, from midnight to early evenings. Weeknights are devoted to jazz music. Weekends include blocks of album adult alternative (AAA), bluegrass, Americana and opera. National and regional shows include Metropolitan Opera radio broadcasts, Sunday Baroque, Mountain Stage, The Thistle and Shamrock, All Songs Considered, Pipedreams and American Routes.

== Low-powered translators ==
Call sign	Frequency	City of license	FID	ERP (W)	Class	FCC info	Notes
W201CN	88.1 FM	Afton, Virginia	93681	10	D	LMS	Relays WVTU-HD2
W208AP	89.5 FM	Lynchburg, Virginia	84544	10	D	LMS	Relays WWVT-FM
W208BX	89.5 FM	Roanoke, Virginia	70342	250	D	LMS	Relays WVTF-HD2
W209AA	89.7 FM	Charlottesville, Virginia	70343	250	D	LMS	Relays WVTW-HD2
W211BE	90.1 FM	Lebanon, Virginia	92700	8.5	D	LMS	Relays WWVT-FM
W211BF	90.1 FM	Big Stone Gap, Virginia	92702	8	D	LMS	Relays WISE-FM-HD2
W215BJ	90.9 FM	Saint Paul, Virginia	122133	1	D	LMS	Relays WWVT-FM
W238BN	95.5 FM	Blacksburg, Virginia	156071	250	D	LMS	Relays WWVT
W270BJ	101.9 FM	Lexington, Virginia	145668	25	D	LMS	Relays WIQR-HD2
