= Art Whino =

Art gallery in Oxon Hill, Maryland, US

Coordinates: 38°52′50″N 77°0′43″W

Art Whino Gallery
- Established: 2007
- Location: American Way, National Harbor, Maryland
- Founder: Shane Pomajambo
- Genre: Lowbrow, Newbrow, pop surrealism
- Other galleries: Blind Whino
- Location: Delaware Avenue SW, Washington, D.C., U.S.
- Website: www.artwhino.com
- www.blindwhino.org

Art Whino is an art gallery at the National Harbor in Oxon Hill, Maryland. Its primary objective has been to provide exposure to artists of the Lowbrow art movement, also sometimes referred to as Pop Surrealism and Newbrow, since its inception in 2007. The gallery space has exhibitions featuring talent from across the U.S. and abroad, as well as publications and specialty toy merchandise pertinent to Newbrow culture and related underground art movements. Art Whino avidly participates in the Washington, D.C. art scene, and other national art events such as Art Basel in Miami and New York Comic Con.

== History ==
The Art Whino Gallery was founded by Shane Pomajambo in 2007. Originally located in Old Town Alexandria, Virginia, it was later relocated six months later to its current location in Maryland. On Friday, October 19, 2007, Art Whino held its first opening reception for artist Derrick Wolbaum's solo show. On its Lowbrow genre, "According to Art Whino owner Shane Pomajambo, the unusual moniker is a nod to his own addiction to the graffiti-inspired, pop surrealist and 'lowbrow' art he specializes in." Since its inception, Art Whino's presence has rapidly increased to including over 1200 artists in its arsenal.

== Exhibitions ==
Art Whino holds exhibitions in its gallery space 8-10 times a year. Past featured artists have included Blaine Fontana, Aaron Jasinski, Brendan Tierney and many more. In efforts of bringing Newbrow art to surrounding communities, Art Whino has participated in many events around the city including Art in a Box, a juried exhibition hosted at the Half Street Fairgrounds, Marcātus, a creative art market, the annual D.C. (e)merge Art Fair, Miami Art Basel in 2009, and New York Comic Con in 2012. In 2012, Art Whino began a new collaborative event called Art without Borders as an international initiative to raise awareness and funds for international organizations providing humanitarian aid across the globe.

=== G40 art summit ===
In March 2010, the inaugural Art Whino month-long G40 summit was held in Crystal City, Virginia in Arlington County, Virginia. Part of the summit mission was to bring leaders of the Newbrow genre together to explore, discuss and grow the movement and serve as a full cross examination of this genre. the Summit featured curated works from around the world that also included music and visual performances, lectures and live painting. Held in an empty office building in Crystal City, Va., the 75,000 sq. ft. exhibition took up the four floors and lobby by some 2,000 artworks by over 500 artists. Art Whino returned mid-May the following year for the second edition of the G40 summit. The month-long event was held at a 25,000 sqft building near the U Street Corridor section of Washington, D.C. Unlike the first summit that mainly explored Newbrow art within a cultural and regional context, the 2011 edition extended its scope to other genres on the forefront of creative transitions and growing in large scale. Some of the genres included were customized collectibles, skateboard art, stencil, wheat paste and 3D installation art. This exhibition also featured 20 artists showcasing 16 foot murals.

May 2012 marked Art Whino's third G40 installation focusing on the "Art of the Mural.” That year, the G40 summit travelled to Richmond, Virginia as the inaugural opening event of the city's official art district. Art Whino invited 12 of the top mural artists from around the globe to unleash their creativity to 20 large-scale walls throughout Richmond. Additionally, exhibitions were held in pop up galleries along the main street of the district as well as a group exhibition for 500+ artists.

=== Richmond Mural Project ===
Launched in 2012 with the help of R. Anthony Harris of RVA Magazine, Venture Richmond and the City of Richmond, the Richmond Mural Project is a yearly project bringing together mural artists from all over the globe in an attempt to establish Richmond, Virginia, as a landmark destination for internationally recognized murals and create exposure for the city. Many of the walls targeted are in disrepair and the Project aims to also be a positive catalyst for change in rebuilding the city as a whole. The Richmond Mural Project hopes to have 100 murals completed in five years within the city. The artists that participated in the first Richmond Mural project are 2501 from Italy, Angry Woebots from California, Aryz from Spain, Gaia from New York, Jaz from Argentina, La Pandilla from Puerto Rico, Lelo from Brazil, Pixel Pancho from Italy, Roa from Belgium, and Scribe from Kansas.

With varying themes and locations throughout Richmond, the Project has aimed to help create an identity. On the selection, "Pomajambo said that if building owners agree to a mural, he asks them about the building and its history, as well as how they feel about their community. Then he tries to match artists who could best describe those feelings with paint." Since its inception, the event has grown in popularity and has given rise to other arts-related events in the city. One mural, created by mural artist Etam Cru, "Moonshine", was ranked No. 3 in global publication Buzzfeed's "Best Street Art in the World of 2013" list.

== Blind Whino ==
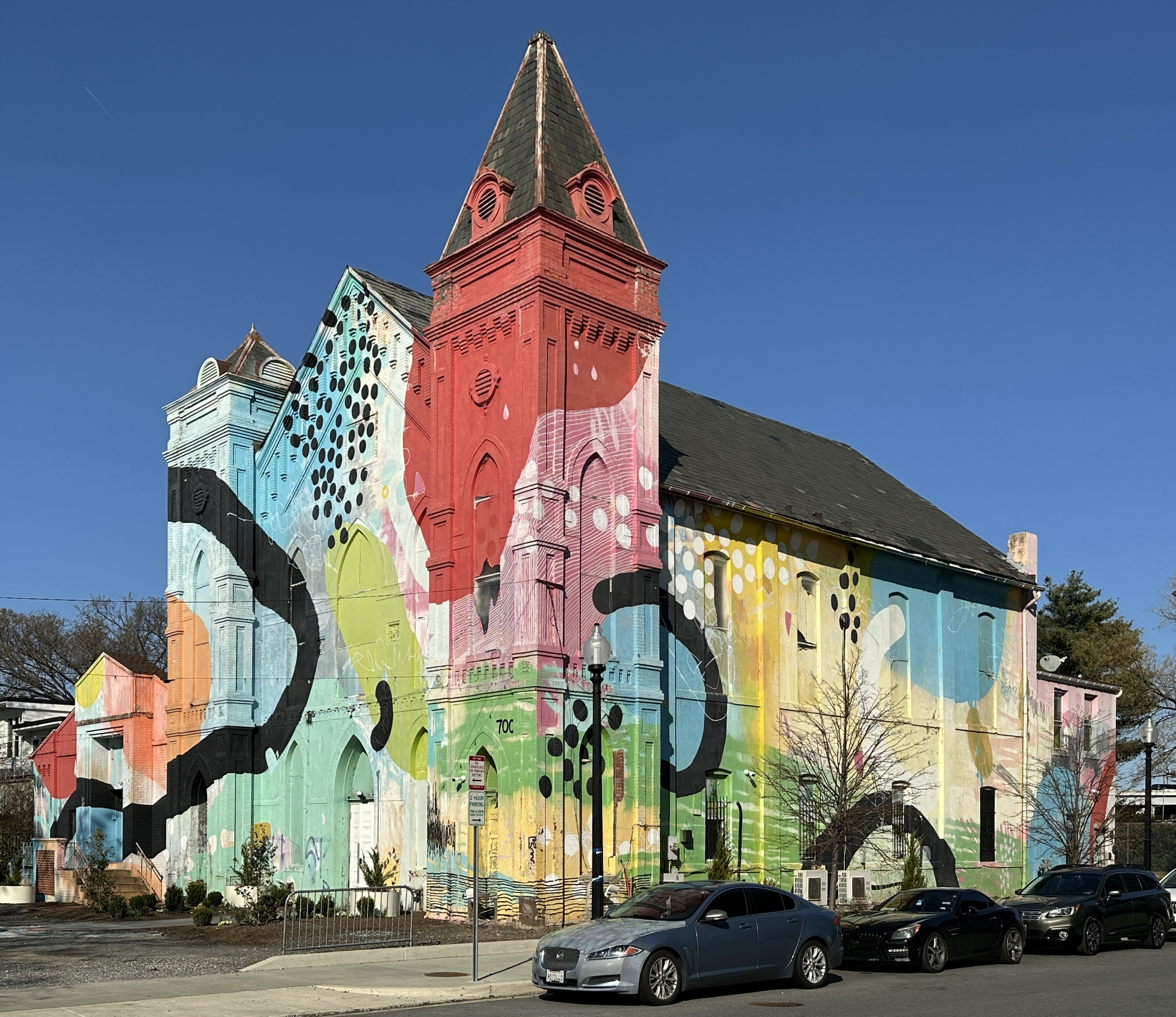
The Blind Whino church fully renovated

Blind Whino is a non-profit organization located in a once defunct and abandoned building, Friendship Baptist Church, nestled in the heart of southwest Washington D.C. Purchased in October 2012 as a branch of the Art Whino Gallery, Blind Whino is a 15,000 sq. ft. property renovated with the intention to provide the community with an art inspired environment for both learning and creating within the arts culture. The exterior and interior of the now completed space was designed by renowned artist HENSE from Atlanta, Georgia and MEGGS from Australia. For over two decades, the former Friendship Baptist church had been vacant. The transformation process began in the fall of 2012 restoring the church from its previously peeling white paint to a brightly multi-colored building. Designed to host a variety of events, Ian Callendar, co-founder of the Blind Whino along with Shane Pomajambo stated, "Here’s a space where anything can happen — theater, music, supper club, jazz, anything that you can imagine." Working on the land outside of the Blind Whino is non-profit organization, Dreaming Out Loud, helping restore it for community utilization.

== Associated publications ==
- Newbrow: 50 Contemporary Artists, August 2012
- Whino Magazine, a quarterly publication devoted to all aspects concerning Lowbrow/ Newbrow culture worldwide.
