= WPZR =

- Emporia, Virginia; United States
- Broadcast area: Emporia, Virginia; Lawrenceville, Virginia; South Hill, Virginia; Roanoke Rapids, North Carolina
- Frequency: 89.3 MHz
- Branding: WPER

Programming
- Format: Christian Hot Adult Contemporary

Ownership
- Owner: Baker Family Stations; (Positive Alternative Radio, Inc.)
- Sister stations: WPER, WPIR, WMXH-FM

History
- First air date: January 1989
- Former call signs: WSVP (1998); WJYA (1998–2019)

Technical information
- Licensing authority: FCC
- Facility ID: 88666
- Class: A
- ERP: 2,000 watts
- HAAT: 135 meters (443 ft)
- Transmitter coordinates: 36°46′4.0″N 77°43′39.0″W

Links
- Public license information: Public file; LMS
- Webcast: Listen live
- Website: wper.org

WPZR is a Christian Hot Adult Contemporary formatted broadcast radio station licensed to Emporia, Virginia, serving Emporia, Lawrenceville, and South Hill in Virginia and Roanoke Rapids in North Carolina. WPZR simulcasts its sister station WPER, Fredericksburg, VA. WPZR is owned and operated by Baker Family Stations.
