= WJSR =

Radio station in Lakeside, Virginia

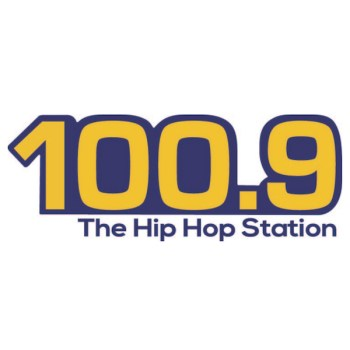
- Lakeside, Virginia; United States
- Broadcast area: Richmond–Petersburg
- Frequency: 100.9 MHz
- Branding: 100.9 The Hip Hop Station

Programming
- Format: Urban contemporary
- Affiliations: Compass Media Networks

Ownership
- Owner: SummitMedia; (SM-WHTI, LLC)
- Sister stations: W291CL; WKHK; WKLR; WURV; W282CA

History
- First air date: December 1988
- Former call signs: WDYL (1968–2010); WHTI (2010–2016)
- Former frequencies: 92.1 MHz (1968–1995); 105.7 MHz (1995–1998); 101.1 MHz (1998–2009)
- Call sign meaning: Former Star branding

Technical information
- Licensing authority: FCC
- Facility ID: 27439
- Class: B1
- ERP: 15,000 watts
- HAAT: 130 meters (430 ft)
- Transmitter coordinates: 37°37′17.5″N 77°22′12.9″W

Links
- Public license information: Public file; LMS
- Website: www.1009hiphop.com

WJSR (100.9 FM) is a commercial radio station licensed to Lakeside, Virginia, United States, serving Richmond and Petersburg in Virginia. WJSR is owned and operated by SummitMedia, and broadcasts an urban contemporary radio format. The station's studios are located west of Richmond proper in unincorporated Chesterfield County, and its transmitter is located in Mechanicsville, Virginia.

WJSR is licensed by the FCC to broadcast in the HD Radio (hybrid) format.

== Programming and corporate history ==
=== 101.1 FM ===
When WRFK-FM 106.5 was planning to sign off as an NPR station in March 1988, it was clear that a new NPR station had to be found. Commonwealth Public Broadcasting Corporation, owners of WCVE-TV and WCVW-TV, applied for and received, a license to temporarily broadcast at 101.1 until a suitable permanent frequency could be found. From March 1988 to October 1989, 101.1 was the home of WCVE-FM and NPR. After WCVE-FM moved to a permanent home at 88.9, the 101.1 frequency went dark.

=== WDYL ===
In December 1968, WDYL signed on first as a country station, then later as a religious station, where it operated on 92.1 FM until 1995. Throughout its first stage of operation, WDYL-FM was a Christian music and ministry station, focusing on contemporary Christian music. WDYL also was home to several sports teams, such as VCU basketball, VMI football, Virginia Tech football and basketball, and the Richmond Renegades pro hockey team.

In a complicated series of events, on November 8, 1995, WDYL moved to 105.7 to allow WCDX (which was on 92.7 FM at the time) to move closer to the city with more power on 92.1. The 101.1 frequency was allotted to Chester (the former city of license of 92.1).

In September 1998, Sinclair Telecable sold the 101.1 frequency to Hoffman, who moved the WDYL call sign and format to 101.1 and traded the 105.7 frequency to Sinclair. Sinclair then signed off WSMJ, which had been on 101.1 and airing a smooth jazz format, and debuted the country-formatted WJRV on their newly purchased 105.7 frequency.

WDYL then continued on 101.1 with Christian music. On July 16, 1999, Hoffman signed off the original Christian station, and sold the dark 101.1 frequency to Radio One, who brought it back as modern rock-formatted "Y101" on October 13, 1999, to fill the void after WBZU flipped to oldies. In 2001, Radio One sold WDYL to Cox Radio.

On September 1, 2009, WDYL moved to 100.9 FM, and kept the "Y101" moniker.

On April 23, 2010, WDYL began redirecting listeners to WMXB, which flipped to adult album alternative "103.7 The River" the previous day. This led to rumors of a possible format change. Six days later on April 29, WDYL flipped to rhythmic contemporary Hot 100.9, with new call letters WHTI. On January 6, 2012, WHTI relaunched the Hot branding and segued to contemporary hit radio, with a launch campaign attacking its competitor WRVQ.

On July 20, 2012, Cox Radio announced the sale of WHTI and 22 other stations to SummitMedia for $66.25 million. The sale was consummated on May 3, 2013.

On May 7, 2014, WHTI began redirecting listeners to new translator W291CL, which began simulcasting WHTI via WURV-HD2. After a 15-day simulcasting period, "Hot" officially moved to W291CL on May 22, and 100.9 FM began stunting with nature sounds. On May 23, 2014, WHTI flipped to soft adult contemporary as "Easy 100.9". On January 27, 2016, WHTI flipped to classic hits as Star 100.9. Bill Bevins and Shelly Perkins continued to host the morning show. The station's call letters changed to WJSR on February 9, 2016.

On October 24, 2018, WJSR flipped to adult hits using the Jack FM branding.

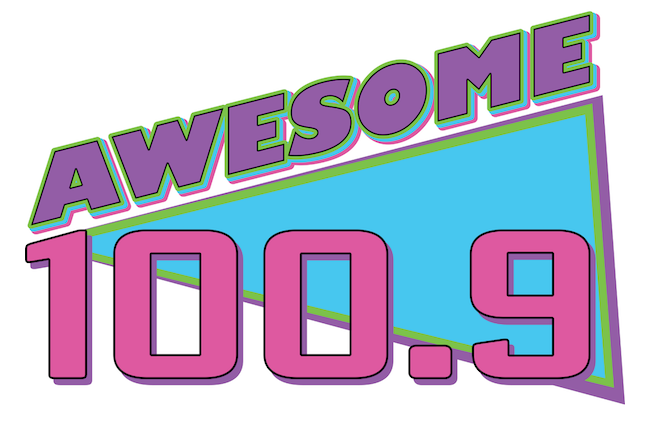
Previous logo

On October 1, 2020, WJSR dropped the adult hits format and began stunting with snippets of songs as "Short Attention Span Radio". On October 13, WJSR shifted their stunting to Christmas music as Santa 100.9. The stunt continued well beyond the holiday season, until March 4, 2021 as WJSR returned to classic hits as Awesome 100.9.

On January 6, 2025, WJSR flipped to urban contemporary as 100.9 The Hip Hop Station.
