= WKYV =

- Petersburg, Virginia; United States
- Broadcast area: Petersburg, Virginia; Richmond, Virginia
- Frequency: 100.3 MHz

Programming
- Format: Contemporary Christian
- Network: K-Love

Ownership
- Owner: Educational Media Foundation
- Sister stations: WLFV; WARV-FM

History
- First air date: November 27, 1992
- Former call signs: WSVV (1991–1994); WSOJ (1994–1999); WARV-FM (1999–2017)
- Call sign meaning: K-Love Virginia

Technical information
- Licensing authority: FCC
- Facility ID: 21826
- Class: A
- ERP: 4,500 watts
- HAAT: 116 meters (381 ft)
- Transmitter coordinates: 37°10′55.5″N 77°23′59.9″W

Links
- Public license information: Public file; LMS
- Webcast: Listen live
- Website: www.klove.com

WKYV (100.3 MHz) is a commercial FM radio station, licensed to Petersburg, Virginia and serving the Greater Richmond Region in Virginia. The station is branded as "K-Love" and features a Contemporary Christian format. The station is owned by Educational Media Foundation. WKYV's transmitter is located off Johnson Road in Petersburg.

== History ==
WKYV signed on November 27, 1992, as WSVV, and carried an urban AC format that was targeted towards its city of license, Petersburg. In August 1994, it would change call letters to WSOJ, but continued with the urban AC format.

On February 10, 1998, WSOJ began simulcasting on newly acquired sister WVGO, which dropped its oldies format. Radio One would buy the station in March 1999. In October 1999, the WVGO/WSOJ simulcast ended, and Radio One began simulcasting their then-country station, WJRV ("105.7 The River") on WSOJ with new calls WARV-FM. In March 2001, Radio One sold the station to Honolulu Broadcasting, who would then lease it to Cox Radio via a local marketing agreement, and would split the simulcast by flipping WARV to a current-heavy country format as "Cat Country" to complement long-time powerhouse WKHK.

In December 2002, Honolulu would terminate the LMA with Cox and sell the station to MainQuad Broadcasting, owners of WBBT-FM, and flipped it to ESPN Radio on April 1, 2003, after months of stunting. On January 21, 2004, WARV dropped ESPN programming and flipped to a simulcast of WBBT, which would also adopt an oldies format on the same date.

In December 2005, WBBT and WARV, along with sister stations WWLB and WLFV, were purchased by Philadelphia-based Main Line Broadcasting.

On July 1, 2014, Main Line Broadcasting sold its Richmond stations to L&L Broadcasting, with the combined entity taking the name Alpha Media.

On October 20, 2014, WARV switched from simulcasting WBBT to sister WWLB, which aired a country format as "The Wolf".

On December 5, 2016, Educational Media Foundation (EMF) filed an application with the FCC to purchase both WARV-FM and WLFV for $2 million.

On March 22, 2017, following the consummation of EMF's purchase, the station began stunting, directing listeners to sister station WWLB (the classic country-formatted "Hank FM"). On March 23, 2017, EMF re-launched the station as "K-Love".

On April 24, 2017, WARV-FM became WKYV as part of a call letter exchange with its sister station on 90.1 FM in Colonial Heights (the WARV-FM calls were a better match for that station's new identity as part of EMF's Air1 network).
