= WBOP =

Radio station in Buffalo Gap, Virginia

Simulcast of WRVL, Lynchburg, VA
- Buffalo Gap, Virginia; United States
- Broadcast area: Staunton, Virginia; Augusta County, Virginia
- Frequency: 95.5 MHz
- Branding: The Journey

Programming
- Format: Contemporary Christian

Ownership
- Owner: Liberty University; (Liberty University, Inc.)

History
- First air date: 1988
- Former call signs: WSPV (1986–1989); WSKO (1989–1995); WSXI (1995–1995); WZXI (1995–2006)

Technical information
- Licensing authority: FCC
- Facility ID: 68304
- Class: A
- ERP: 6,000 watts
- HAAT: 94 meters (308 ft)
- Transmitter coordinates: 38°10′55.0″N 79°13′34.0″W

Links
- Public license information: Public file; LMS
- Webcast: Listen live
- Website: myjourneyfm.com

WBOP (95.5 FM) is a Contemporary Christian-formatted broadcast radio station licensed to Buffalo Gap, Virginia, US serving Staunton, Virginia and Augusta County, Virginia. WBOP is owned and operated by Liberty University.

== History ==
The station first took the callsign WSPV on September 25, 1986 and was officially launched in 1988.

=== WSKO ===
Easy Radio Inc. bought the station and on March 24, 1989, the callsign was changed to WSKO and carried a country format, branded as "Super Country". In 1992, the format was changed to Hot Adult Contemporary.

=== WSXI/WZXI ===
On March 10, 1995, the callsign was changed from WSKO to WSXI, then to WZXI. In October 1997, WZXI dropped the Hot Adult Contemporary format for News/Talk. In September 2005 the News/Talk format was dropped and the station was completely silent for about a month. Vox Communications bought the station, and on October 7, 2005, WZXI became an Adult Hits format, branded as "Sam 95.5; Simply about music".

On August 16, 2006, the Adult/Variety Hits format on 95.5 FM was dropped when WBOP moved its format and callsign from 106.3 FM to 95.5 FM, and resumed its Oldies format as "Magic 95.5; Classic Top 40", while the 106.3 FM frequency went silent. 95.5 FM continued to keep the WZXI callsign until two weeks later on September 1, when the WBOP callsign officially moved from 106.3 FM to 95.5 FM. The 106.3 facility was moved to Charlottesville and became WCNR.

==== Format flip - 2008 ====
At 9:00 A.M. on March 30, 2008, WBOP swapped its Oldies format for Rockin' Country, branded as "Rebel 95.5; A New Kind of Country".

==== Format flip - 2010 ====
In February 2010, WBOP began stunting by playing a mix of country and Hot Adult Contemporary, with a new Hot Adult Contemporary format to follow. The station continued to use the branding "Rebel 95.5". At midnight on February 26, 2010, WBOP officially dropped "Rockin'" Country for Hot Adult Contemporary and began using the branding "My 95.5; New music all day" and then changed the slogan to "The Valley's Alternative" in late 2011.

==== Format flips - 2012 ====
Logo used from March 1 to November 26, 2012.

At midnight, on March 1, 2012, WBOP switched from a Hot Adult Contemporary format to sports as "95-5 The Zone".

At midnight, on November 27, 2012, WBOP changed the format again from Sports to Adult Contemporary under the branding "95-5 WBOP; Today's Hits and Yesterday's Favorites". WBOP picked up programming from the Hits & Favorites network from Cumulus Media Networks.

On December 31, 2012, WBOP and seven other properties were sold by Vox Radio to Gamma Broadcasting, LLC for US$4,403,500.

==== Format flip - 2015 ====
From August 31, 2015, Gamma consummated their donation of WBOP to Liberty University and started simulcasting WRVL's Contemporary Christian format in Lynchburg, Virginia on September 1 as "The Journey".
