= WMXH-FM =

Radio station in Luray, Virginia

- Luray, Virginia; United States
- Broadcast area: Page County, Virginia; Southern Shenandoah County, Virginia; Northern Rockingham County, Virginia
- Frequency: 105.7 MHz
- Branding: WPER

Programming
- Format: Christian hot adult contemporary

Ownership
- Owner: Baker Family Stations; (Positive Alternative Radio, Inc.)
- Sister stations: WPER, WPIR, WPZR

History
- First air date: October 16, 1979
- Former call signs: WLCC (1979–1998)
- Call sign meaning: Mix Harrisonburg (former brand)

Technical information
- Licensing authority: FCC
- Facility ID: 12625
- Class: A
- ERP: 150 watts
- HAAT: 601 meters (1,972 ft)
- Transmitter coordinates: 38°35′59.0″N 78°38′1.0″W

Links
- Public license information: Public file; LMS
- Webcast: Listen live
- Website: wper.org

WMXH-FM (105.7 FM) is a Christian Hot Adult Contemporary formatted broadcast radio station licensed to Luray, Virginia, serving Page County, Southern Shenandoah County and Northern Rockingham County, all in Virginia. WMXH-FM is owned and operated by Baker Family Stations, through licensee Positive Alternative Radio, Inc.

== History ==
The station first launched on October 16, 1979 with the callsign WLCC as an Adult Contemporary format, branded as "106.3 WLCC" and was owned by the Luray Caverns Corporation.

In 1989 the FCC required WLCC to change the frequency to 105.7, to allow a new station to be built at Churchville, Virginia on 106.3 (this station is now WCNR); WLCC also filed to increase power as a result.

On May 8, 1998, the station's format was segued to Hot Adult Contemporary. On the same date, the station's callsign was changed to WMXH-FM, as well as its branding, to "Mix 105.7". In mid-2002, WMXH-FM switched to an Adult Standards format, branded as "Stardust 105.7; The Music of Your Life". The station played hits from the 1940s through the 1960s. On June 4, 2014, WMXH-FM and sister station WRAA were sold to Hayden Hamilton Media Strategies for $325,000. The sale was closed on October 1, 2014. On the night of October 24, 2014, WMXH-FM dropped its Adult Standards format and went silent until approximately 10:00 A.M. on December 18, 2014, when it returned on the air with a Classic Hits format branded as "Bright Radio 105-7; Sassy Soul; Fun Time Rock & Roll", playing hits from the 1960s through the 1990s.

On April 17, 2019, WMXH-FM began simulcasting WPER, Fredericksburg, VA. Hayden Hamilton Media Strategies sold WMXH-FM and WRAA to WPER owner Baker Family Stations effective December 19, 2019, for $165,000.
