= WKHK =

- Colonial Heights, Virginia; United States
- Broadcast area: Richmond–Petersburg
- Frequency: 95.3 MHz (HD Radio)
- Branding: K95.3

Programming
- Format: Country music
- Subchannels: HD2: Classic country; HD3: Christian contemporary (WRVL)
- Affiliations: Premiere Networks

Ownership
- Owner: SummitMedia; (SM-WKHK, LLC)
- Sister stations: W282CA, W291CL, WJSR, WKLR, WURV

History
- First air date: November 17, 1972; 53 years ago
- Former call signs: WPVA-FM (1972–1984)
- Call sign meaning: Kick (previous branding)

Technical information
- Licensing authority: FCC
- Facility ID: 319
- Class: B
- ERP: 47,000 watts
- HAAT: 156 meters (512 ft)
- Transmitter coordinates: 37°26′22.0″N 77°26′1.0″W
- Translators: HD2: 104.3 W282CA (Richmond); HD3: 94.9 W235AI (Richmond)

Links
- Public license information: Public file; LMS
- Webcast: FM/HD1 Listen live Listen live (via iHeartRadio) (HD2)
- Website: k95country.com

WKHK (95.3 FM "K95.3") is a commercial radio station licensed to Colonial Heights, Virginia, United States, serving Richmond and Petersburg. It broadcasts a country format and is owned by SummitMedia. The studios are in Richmond on Moorefield Park Drive near Midlothian Turnpike (U.S. Route 60).

The transmitter is in Bensley, Virginia. WKHK broadcasts in HD Radio; WKHK's subchannels play classic country and Christian contemporary formats.

== History ==
The station signed on the air on November 17, 1972. Its original call sign was WPVA-FM, the sister station to WPVA 1290 AM (now WDZY). Both stations were owned by Sterling Broadcasting, simulcasting a full service country music format. Because the AM station was a daytimer, required to go off the air at night, WPVA-FM was able to continue broadcasting its country music into the evening.

WPVA-AM-FM were originally licensed to Petersburg but later changed their city of license to the suburb of Colonial Heights. At the time, WPVA-FM was only powered at 3,000 watts, a fraction of its current output. That limited its signal to Petersburg and adjacent communities but not the larger Richmond radio market. In 1984, WPVA-FM separated its programming from the AM station, going with a more music country sound, with fewer interruptions and DJ chatter. It changed its call letters to WKHK, to represent the word "kick" (The WKHK call sign had been used for a New York City country station on 106.7 FM between 1980 and 1984. That station is now adult contemporary WLTW Lite-FM).

In 1988, WKHK was acquired by ABS Richmond Partners. It was given permission by the Federal Communications Commission (FCC) to increase its power. That allowed it to cover the larger, more lucrative Richmond metropolitan area.

Cox Media bought WKHK in 2000. The Atlanta-based company has newspaper, cable and broadcasting properties around the U.S. In February 2013, Cox sold its radio properties in Richmond, including WKHK, and several other markets to SummitMedia, based in Birmingham, Alabama.

== Subchannels ==
=== WKHK-HD2 and W282CA ===
On August 7, 2016, WKHK-HD2 and FM translator W282CA signed on for the first time. The new stations began stunting with Nuthin' but a 'G' Thang, by Dr. Dre and Snoop Dogg, on a loop. The stunt ended just after Noon, on August 9, and the Classic Hip Hop format began. Using Westwood One's Classic Hip Hop network, the first song heard on the station, after the stunting, was Rock It by Master P.

On May 7, 2021, WKHK-HD2/W282CA dropped the classic hip hop format and began simulcasting WKHK's main signal.

On January 11, 2022, WKHK-HD2/W282CA ended the WKHK simulcast and changed its format to classic country as "Classic Country 104.3".

On April 22, 2026, WKHK-HD2/W282CA rebranded as "Neon Country 104.3".

=== WKHK-HD3 and W235AI ===
WKHK-HD3 carries a non-commercial Contemporary Christian music format branded as "The Journey" based at 88.3 WRVL in Lynchburg. That programming feeds translator W235AI at 94.9 FM. WRVL is owned by Liberty University, which was founded by televangelist Jerry Falwell.

Broadcast translator for WKHK
Call sign	Frequency	City of license	FID	ERP (W)	HAAT	Class	FCC info	Notes
W282CA	104.3 FM	Richmond, Virginia	154008	250	180 m (591 ft)	D	LMS	translator for HD2 subchannel
