= W291CL =

Translator for WURV-HD2 Richmond
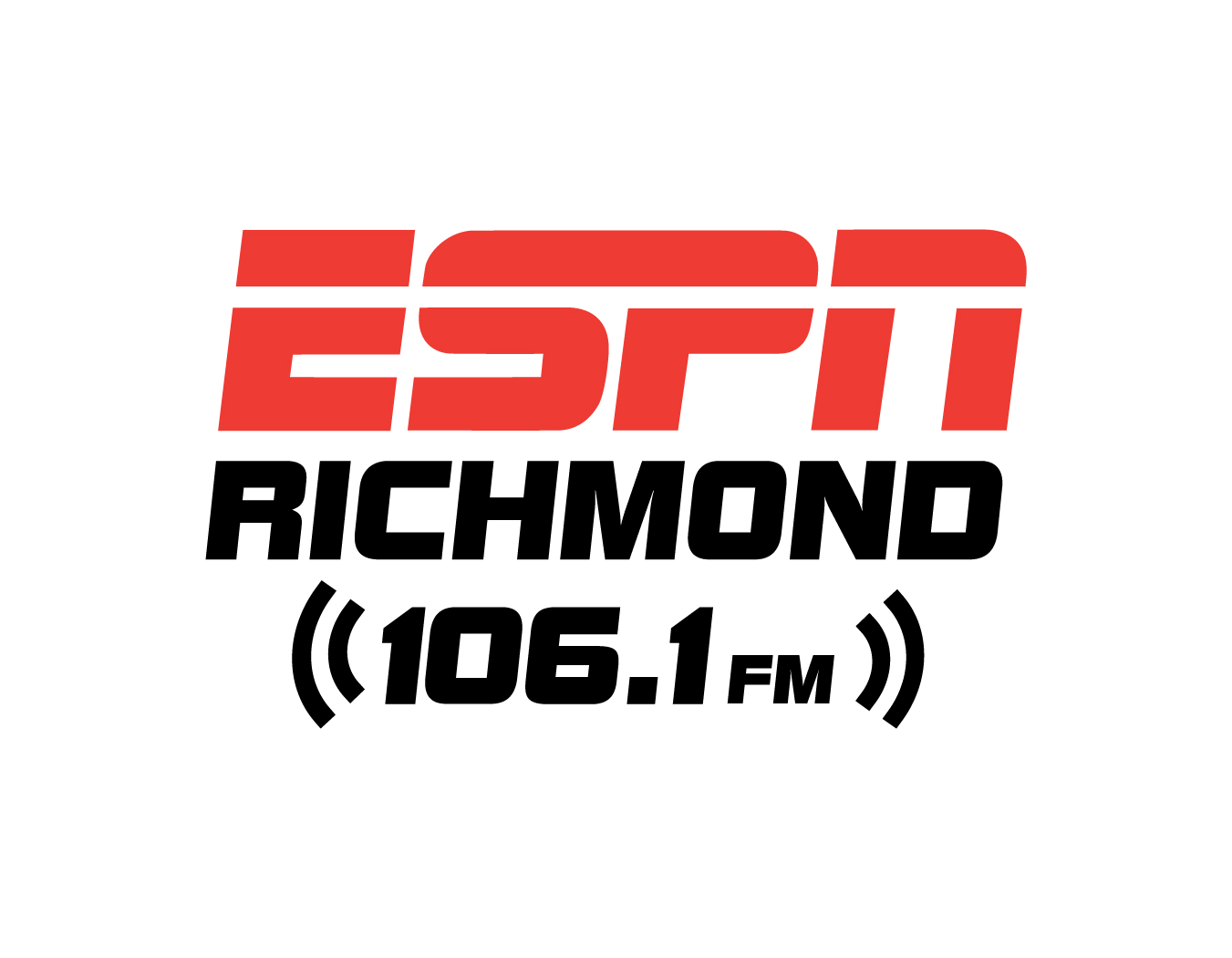

Richmond, Virginia; United States
- Broadcast area: Metro Richmond
- Frequency: 106.1 MHz
- Branding: 106.1 ESPN

Programming
- Format: Sports radio
- Affiliations: ESPN Radio

Ownership
- Owner: Radio by Grace, Inc.
- Operator: SummitMedia
- Sister stations: WKHK, WKLR, WJSR, WURV. W282CA

History
- First air date: 2013; 13 years ago
- Call sign meaning: Translator allocation on FCC channel 291.

Technical information
- Licensing authority: FCC
- Facility ID: 155800
- Class: D
- Power: 250 watts
- HAAT: 188 meters (617 ft)
- Transmitter coordinates: 37°36′52.0″N 77°30′56.0″W

Links
- Public license information: Public file; LMS
- Webcast: Listen Live
- Website: espnrichmond.com

W291CL is a broadcast translator radio station licensed to Richmond, Virginia, serving Metro Richmond. W291CL is owned by Radio by Grace, Inc. and operated by SummitMedia under an LMA.

== History ==
The FCC authorized W291CL in April 2013. The station signed on in May 2014 relaying WHTI's "Hot 100.9" programming for several days, before the slogan changed to reflect the new dial position at 106.1 MHz as "Hot 106.1".

The license was transferred by owner Clark Parrish from his Radio Assist Ministry holding company to his Edgewater Broadcasting holding company on January 2, 2015, as part of a 69-station transfer.

As a translator is not permitted to originate its own programming, by Federal Communications Commission (FCC) regulation, W291CL is relaying the HD2 subchannel of WURV 103.7 FM.

On June 26, 2017, W291CL/WURV-HD2 dropped its contemporary hits format and began stunting with songs with "Move" in the title, while redirecting listeners to sister WURV. At Noon the following day, W291CL/WURV-HD2 flipped to sports radio as "Sports 106.1", and began carrying CBS Sports Radio around the clock.

In September 2018, after his non-compete with Urban One's WXGI expired, long-time local morning host "Big Al" Coleman's SportsPhone began airing weekdays from 7-9 am.

Effective February 2, 2021, W291CL's license was assigned by Edgewater Broadcasting to Radio by Grace, Inc.

On April 1, 2021, W291CL/WURV-HD2 dropped the CBS Sports Radio affiliation and picked up the ESPN Radio affiliation from WXGI 950 AM Richmond and rebranded as "106.1 ESPN".
