= WKLR =

Radio station in Fort Gregg-Adams–Richmond, Virginia

- Fort Gregg-Adams, Virginia; United States
- Broadcast area: Richmond, Virginia; Petersburg, Virginia
- Frequency: 96.5 MHz (HD Radio)
- Branding: Classic Rock 96.5

Programming
- Format: Classic rock
- Subchannels: HD3: Simulcast of WPER

Ownership
- Owner: SummitMedia; (SM-WKLR, LLC)
- Sister stations: W291CL; WJSR; WKHK; WURV; W282CA

History
- First air date: July 29, 1963 (as WBCI-FM)
- Former call signs: WBCI-FM (1963–1974); WBCI (1974–1980); WBCI-FM (1980–1982); WQKS (1982–1985); WQSF-FM (1985–1989); WQSF (1989–1990); WDCK (1990–1995); WLEE-FM (1995–1997)
- Call sign meaning: (K) "Classic Rock"

Technical information
- Licensing authority: FCC
- Facility ID: 71330
- Class: B
- ERP: 50,000 watts
- HAAT: 138 meters (453 ft)
- Transmitter coordinates: 37°20′21.5″N 77°24′32.5″W
- Translator: HD3: 102.5 W273BB (Richmond)

Links
- Public license information: Public file; LMS
- Webcast: Listen live
- Website: www.classicrock965.fm

WKLR (96.5 FM) is a classic rock formatted broadcast radio station licensed to Fort Gregg-Adams, Virginia, serving Richmond and Petersburg in Virginia. WKLR is owned and operated by SummitMedia. The station's studios and offices are located west of Richmond proper in unincorporated Chesterfield County, and its transmitter is located in Chester, Virginia.

Previous logo

== HD Radio ==
WKLR is licensed by the FCC to broadcast in the HD Radio format, and broadcasts one HD subchannel:

- WKLR-HD3 retransmits WPER from Fredericksburg, Virginia, which features contemporary Christian music and feeds translator W273BB at 102.5 in Richmond.
