= WRVL =

Radio station at Liberty University in Lynchburg, Virginia

- Lynchburg, Virginia; United States
- Broadcast area: New River Valley
- Frequency: 88.3 MHz
- Branding: The Journey

Programming
- Format: Contemporary Christian music

Ownership
- Owner: Liberty University

History
- First air date: July 1981
- Call sign meaning: Radio Victory Liberty (former branding)

Technical information
- Licensing authority: FCC
- Facility ID: 37249
- Class: C1
- Power: 28,000 watts
- HAAT: 346 meters (1,135 ft)
- Transmitter coordinates: 37°11′50.0″N 79°21′7.0″W

Links
- Public license information: Public file; LMS
- Webcast: Listen live
- Website: myjourneyfm.com

WRVL (88.3 FM) is a non-commercial radio station licensed to Lynchburg, Virginia, United States, and serving the New River Valley. Owned by Liberty University, it broadcasts a Christian Contemporary format known as "The Journey." The studios and offices are on Candlers Mountain Road in Lynchburg. WRVL's transmitter is sited on Uphill Trail in Altavista. Programming is also simulcast on 19 rebroadcasters and FM translators in Virginia and North Carolina.

== History ==
=== Early years ===
WRVL signed on the air in July 1981. It had been powered at 100,000 watts, the maximum for most FM stations in the U.S. but on a shorter tower than it uses today. It originally broadcast Christian talk and teaching programs, including those of founder and televangelist Jerry Falwell, who started Liberty University. WRVL faced a series of technical problems in its early years revolving around interference to television reception near the station site.

In December 1981, the Federal Communications Commission ordered the station to greatly reduce its effective radiated power (ERP) from 100,000 to 5,000 watts. In 1982, its tower was brought down by vandals. While the station was off the air, viewers reported better reception of WDBJ Channel 7, the CBS network affiliate for Roanoke-Lynchburg. WRVL later moved to a new tower in Altavista, reducing interference with Channel 7.

=== WVTW subchannel ===
In 2009, WRVL broke ground by forming a partnership with NPR broadcaster 89.1 WVTW, owned by Virginia Tech. This allowed WRVL to repeat Victory FM programming on WVTW's HD-3 digital subchannel in Charlottesville, Virginia. This is noteworthy because it makes WVTW perhaps one of few HD radio stations in the nation funded by the federal Public Telecommunications Facilities Program (PTFP).

On December 26, 2014, WRVL dropped nearly all its Christian talk and teaching programs, switching to a Contemporary Christian music format. The station's moniker also changed from "Victory Radio Network" to "The Journey". It uses the slogan "Life, Hope, Music."

== Simulcasts ==
"The Journey" is carried on several stations and HD Radio digital subchannels in Virginia and North Carolina.

Call sign	Frequency	City of license	State	Facility ID	Class	ERP (W)
WVRL	88.3 FM	Elizabeth City	North Carolina	86560	C2	50,000
WVRA	107.3 FM	Enfield	North Carolina	164202	A	4,100
WVRH	94.3 FM	Norlina	North Carolina	1208	A	6,000
WVRP	91.1 FM	Roanoke Rapids	North Carolina	85603	A	2,000
WVRD	90.5 FM	Zebulon	North Carolina	41094	A	1,200
WBOP	95.5 FM	Buffalo Gap	Virginia	68304	A	6,000
WVTW-HD3	88.5-3 FM (Note: HD Radio subchannel)	Charlottesville	Virginia	63547	B1	1,000
WVRI	90.9 FM	Clifton Forge	Virginia	177072	B	1,000
WVTR-HD3	91.9-3 FM	Marion	Virginia	70340	C2	4,500
WHRO-HD3	90.3-3 FM	Norfolk	Virginia	25940	B	8,800
WRXL-HD3 (Note: Added September 2015)	102.1-3 FM	Richmond	Virginia	11961	B	20,000
WVTF-HD3	89.1-3 FM	Roanoke	Virginia	70338	C	100,000

=== Translators ===
"The Journey" is relayed by additional translators to widen its broadcast area. W236BO at 95.1 served Burlington, North Carolina prior to 2013, until WPCM took it over.

Call sign	Frequency (MHz)	City of license	State	Facility ID	Class	ERP (W)	Rebroadcasts
W246DD	97.1	Charlottesville	Virginia	142781	D	99	WVTW-HD3
W234CT	94.7	Marion	Virginia	142574	D	99	WVTR-HD3
W293AS	106.5	Pulaski	Virginia	139561	D	10	WVTF-HD3
W235AI	94.9	Richmond	Virginia	150414	D	16	WKHK-HD3
W293AX	106.5	Roanoke	Virginia	150414	D	10	WVTF-HD3
W297BH	107.3	Suffolk	Virginia	155036	D	25	WHRO-HD3
W270BO	101.9	Wytheville	Virginia	139560	D	10	WVTR-HD3
