= WDYL (search engine) =

Search engine from Google

What Do You Love
- Google WDYL home page
- Website type: Search engine
- Available in: Multilingual (124)
- Owner: Google
- Creators: Sergey Brin and Larry Page
- Revenue: From AdWords
- Website: list of domain names http://www.wdyl.com/
- IPv6 support: Yes, by arrangement ipv6.wdyl.com
- Commercial: Yes
- Registration: Optional
- Launched: June 27, 2011
- Current status: Inactive (404'd as of July-2018)

What Do You Love (WDYL) was a metasearch engine from Google. The main purpose of WDYL is to get more of what you love by searching across numerous Google products with one click. The search is censored with search words deemed inappropriate by Google, resulting in the user being redirected to the WDYL page for kittens with an image of a rainbow in the background. The service is now inactive, with the URL resulting in a 404 response. This discontinuation reflects the dynamic nature of Google's service offerings, where they frequently test, iterate, and sometimes retire various projects based on user engagement and strategic focus.
