= RVA Magazine =

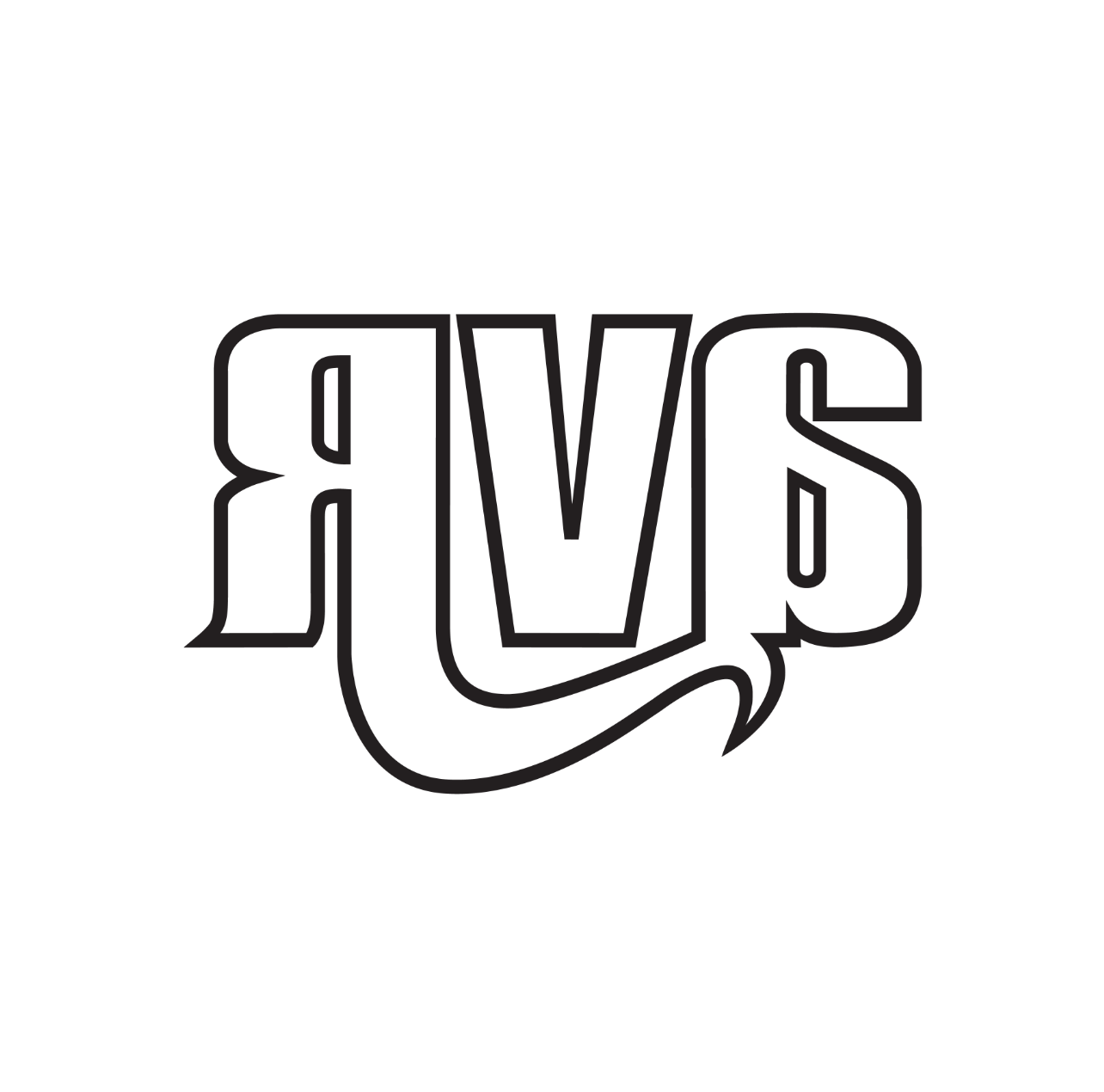
RVA Magazine logo 2015

RVA Magazine is a magazine, launched in April 2005 as a full color publication with a focus on street art, trendsetting local music and counter culture ideas coming from the Richmond, Virginia area. It was founded by R. Anthony Harris and Jeremy Parker. The mission of RVA Magazine is to cross-pollinate cultures and encourage the spread of new ideas in Richmond, VA. The magazine was the first to use and has been credited with popularizing the term "RVA", which became the city's official moniker around 2012, and stands for a progressive, diverse and creative city. In 2017 it began to take on a more political bent.

In addition, R. Anthony Harris and RVA Magazine has also been involved in creating and marketing culturally relevant events like the annual week long Halloween idea - Halloweek started in 2006, launched the first citywide New Year's Eve celebration Carytown New Year's Eve in 2006-2007 that drew over 22,000+ attendees and regional recognition, RVA NYE in 2015 on Brown's Island attended by over 14,000 people+, and was instrumental in the launch and support of The Richmond Mural Project by Art Whino in 2012 that brought international attention to the city's growing street art scene. The magazine was the first city publication to support the then fledgling but culturally important First Friday Arts Walk initiative back in 2006.

RVA is distributed free to the public in print form and in digital formats through their webpage RVAmag.com. RVA Magazine's parent company Inkwell Ventures also owns and operates Virginia's only LGBT news source, GayRVA.com.
