= W282CA =

Translator for WKHK-HD2 Colonial Heights
- Richmond, Virginia; United States
- Broadcast area: Metro Richmond
- Frequency: 104.3 MHz
- Branding: Neon Country 104.3

Programming
- Format: Classic country

Ownership
- Owner: Radio by Grace, Inc.
- Operator: SummitMedia
- Sister stations: W291CL, WJSR, WKHK, WKLR, WURV

History
- First air date: August 7, 2016; 9 years ago
- Former call signs: W281BF (2013–2014)
- Former frequencies: 104.1 MHz (2013–2014)
- Call sign meaning: (serially assigned)

Technical information
- Licensing authority: FCC
- Facility ID: 154008
- Class: D
- ERP: 250 watts
- HAAT: 180 meters (590 ft)
- Transmitter coordinates: 37°36′52.0″N 77°30′56.0″W

Links
- Public license information: Public file; LMS
- Webcast: Listen Live
- Website: neoncountry1043.com

W282CA is a classic country formatted broadcast radio station licensed to and serving Richmond, Virginia. W282CA is owned by Radio by Grace, Inc., and operated by SummitMedia.

== History ==
On August 7, 2016, W282CA signed on for the first time and began stunting with "Nuthin' but a 'G' Thang", by Dr. Dre featuring Snoop Doggy Dogg, on a loop. The stunt ended just after Noon, on August 9, and the Classic Hip Hop format began. Using Westwood One's Classic Hip Hop network, the first song heard on the station was "Rock It" by Master P featuring Weebie and Krazy.

On May 7, 2021, W282CA dropped the classic hip hop format and began simulcasting parent station WKHK's country format.

On January 11, 2022, W282CA changed its format to classic country as "Classic Country 104.3". On April 22, 2026, the station rebranded as "Neon Country 104.3", with no change in format.
