= WPIR (FM) =

Christian hot adult contemporary radio station in Culpeper, Virginia, United States

- Culpeper, Virginia; United States
- Broadcast area: Northern Virginia
- Frequency: 89.9 MHz
- Branding: WPER

Programming
- Format: Christian hot adult contemporary

Ownership
- Owner: Baker Family Stations; (Positive Alternative Radio, Inc.)
- Sister stations: WPER, WPZR, WMXH-FM

History
- First air date: 1999
- Former call signs: WCFL (1987–1990); WPAV (1990); WPVB (1990–1996); WPER (1996–2018)

Technical information
- Licensing authority: FCC
- Facility ID: 18852
- Class: B
- Power: 41,000 watts
- HAAT: 127.4 meters (418 ft)
- Transmitter coordinates: 38°40′42.0″N 77°47′18.0″W
- Translator: See § Translators

Links
- Public license information: Public file; LMS
- Webcast: Listen live
- Website: wper.org

WPIR (89.9 FM) is a Christian hot adult contemporary–formatted broadcast radio station licensed to Culpeper, Virginia. It serves the Northern Virginia area from a transmitter near Warrenton, Virginia, and simulcasts its sister station WPER. The station is owned and operated by Baker Family Stations.

== Combined 89.5/90.5 history ==
Old WPER Logo used from 1999 to 2006

In January 2006, Positive Alternative Radio bought the old CSN-Virginia, a network of four full-power stations and almost two dozen translators that formerly broadcast programming from local Calvary Chapel churches alongside KAWZ's Calvary Satellite Network. In the buyout, these stations were split between the then-WPER and WRXT in Lynchburg. WPER obtained WJYJ, based out of Fredericksburg, and seven of the translators, increasing its range of its new network all the way down to Richmond, Williamsburg, and even Buckingham County. Accordingly, WPER changed all promotional materials from "Positive Hits 89.9 WPER" to "Positive Hits 89.9 and the NEW 90.5".

WPIR swapped call signs with sister station WPER on February 20, 2018.

== Translators ==
WPIR is relayed by three translators to widen its broadcast area. Co-owned WPER relays the same programming on additional translators.

Call sign	Frequency	City of license	FID	ERP (W)	HAAT	Class	FCC info
W228BA	93.5 FM	Leesburg, Virginia	18877	10	359 m (1,178 ft)	D	LMS
W243AF	96.5 FM	Flint Hill, Virginia	18881	10	318 m (1,043 ft)	D	LMS
W269DH	101.7 FM	Leesburg, Virginia	141387	13	118 m (387 ft)	D	LMS
W279CV	103.7 FM	Winchester, Virginia	142768	10	175 m (574 ft)	D	LMS
