= Buffalo Gap, Virginia =

Unincorporated community in Virginia, United States

- Unincorporated community
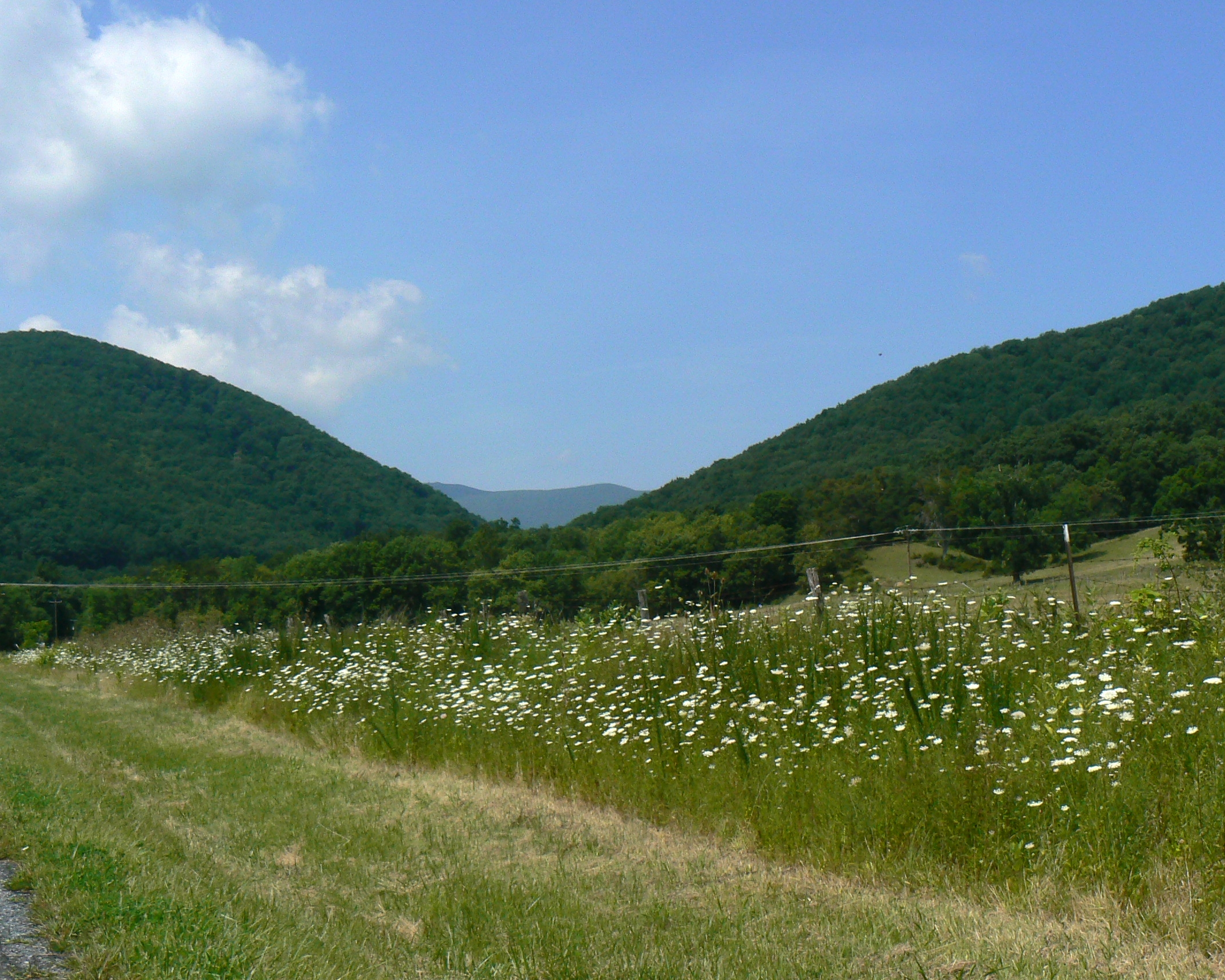
- Buffalo Gap is a mountain pass through Little North Mountain

- Location within Virginia Location within the United States
- Coordinates: 38°11′13″N 79°14′22″W
- Country: United States
- State: Virginia
- County: Augusta
- Elevation: 1,781 ft (543 m)
- Time zone: UTC-5 (Eastern (EST))
  - Summer (DST): UTC-4 (EDT)
- GNIS feature ID: 1492667

Buffalo Gap is an unincorporated community in Augusta County, Virginia, United States. Buffalo Gap is located approximately 9.5 miles (15.3 km) northwest of Staunton.

== History ==
Buffalo Gap experienced a boom when an iron furnace was built there by the Buffalo Gap Furnace Company. A town of about 70 houses, a railroad station, a post office, and several schools were built around the furnace in the coming years. In 1850, the Buffalo Gap Presbyterian Church was founded about a mile west of the church's current location.

The furnace was unsuccessful, leaving Buffalo Gap a ghost town. The town was taken over by the Buffalo Gap Development company, which aspired to make Buffalo Gap a thriving town again.

In 2004, the community was described as a "bedroom community" for nearby Staunton, where people could enjoy country life, but not have to travel far to get to a city.

As of 2004, the community had a population of "about 200 people".
