= WBBT-FM =

Radio station in Powhatan–Richmond, Virginia

- Powhatan, Virginia; United States
- Broadcast area: Greater Richmond Region
- Frequency: 107.3 MHz
- Branding: VPM Music

Programming
- Format: Public radio; classical music; jazz
- Affiliations: NPR; Classical 24 Network; WFMT Jazz Network

Ownership
- Owner: VPM Media Corporation
- Sister stations: WWLB; WCVE-FM; WCVE-TV

History
- First air date: June 21, 1999
- Former call signs: WXNC (1999)
- Call sign meaning: "Beat" (former branding)

Technical information
- Facility ID: 31859
- Class: A
- ERP: 1,400 watts
- HAAT: 207 meters (679 ft)
- Transmitter coordinates: 37°30′16.5″N 77°42′13″W

Links
- Webcast: Listen live
- Website: vpm.org

WBBT-FM (107.3 FM) is a non-commercial radio station licensed to Powhatan, Virginia, and serving the Greater Richmond Region. WBBT-FM is owned and operated by VPM Media Corporation. It airs an eclectic music format, focusing on classical music on weekdays, jazz in the evening and diverse musical genres on weekends, including world music, opera and blues. It carries programming from NPR, Classical 24 and the WFMT Jazz Network.

Along with simulcast partner WWLB in Ettrick, Virginia, WBBT is branded as VPM Music, and is a sister station to the area's NPR news and information affiliate, WCVE-FM. WBBT serves the northern part of the Richmond radio market, while WWLB serves the southern portion.

WBBT-FM studios and offices are on Sesame Street in Richmond. The transmitter is off Dry Bridge Road in Midlothian, Virginia.

== History ==
WBBT-FM signed on June 21, 1999, as WXNC, and airing a rhythmic oldies format as "107.3 The Beat, Richmond's Dancin' Oldies". The station adopted the current WBBT-FM calls on August 6. However, by November 2000, the station shifted to a dance-leaning rhythmic AC as "Dance Hits 107.3".

In June 2001, WBBT flipped to all-1980s hits as "Star 107.3" (which would evolve to an 1980s/1990s hybrid as "Star 107").

On January 21, 2004, at 7:07 a.m., after a day of stunting as "Elvis 107", the station flipped to 1960s/1970s oldies as "Oldies 107.3". At the same time, recently purchased sister station WARV-FM 100.3, whose tower is in Petersburg, flipped from "ESPN Richmond" to a simulcast of WBBT, giving the new oldies format some new coverage in Southside Virginia where 107.3's signal is weak.

In December 2005, WBBT and WARV, along with sister stations WWLB and WLFV, were purchased by Philadelphia-based Main Line Broadcasting.

On September 27, 2007, the station rebranded as "107.3 BBT". The playlist was widened at the time slightly to include a few early 1980s rock hits, but the station continued to focus on 1964 to 1979. The positioner changed again on December 4, 2009, to "Big Oldies 107.3".

On July 1, 2014, Main Line Broadcasting sold its Richmond stations to L&L Broadcasting, with the combined entity taking the name Alpha Media.

On March 22, 2017, WBBT shifted its format from classic hits to 1980s hits. Starting with the 2016-17 season, WBBT also carried the University of Richmond Spiders football and men's basketball games.

On December 20, 2017, Commonwealth Public Broadcasting Corporation announced that they would acquire WBBT and sister station, WWLB, with the intention of moving WCVE-FM's music programming to the stations.

The switch took place on February 15, 2018, at 1:00 p.m. Eastern. The last song of the classic hits format was Europe's The Final Countdown.

On June 1, 2018, WBBT-FM and WWLB broke off the simulcast of WCVE-FM to air a new format, "WCVE Music", which took over and augmented WCVE-FM's music programming. On August 5, 2019, WBBT-FM and WWLB were both rebranded as "VPM Music".
