= WLFV =

K-Love radio station in Midlothian–Richmond, Virginia

- Midlothian, Virginia; United States
- Broadcast area: Richmond, Virginia
- Frequency: 98.9 MHz
- Branding: K-Love

Programming
- Format: Contemporary Christian
- Network: K-Love

Ownership
- Owner: Educational Media Foundation
- Sister stations: WARV-FM; WKYV

History
- First air date: November 22, 1971 (as WJMA-FM)
- Former call signs: WJMA-FM (1971–1984); WVJZ (1984–1990); WJMA-FM (1990–2004); WCUL (2004–2005); WWLB (2005–2014)
- Former frequencies: 96.7 MHz (1971–2001)
- Call sign meaning: "Wolf Virginia" (previous format)

Technical information
- Facility ID: 54872
- Class: B1
- ERP: 4,800 watts
- HAAT: 227.4 meters (746 ft)
- Transmitter coordinates: 37°36′52.5″N 77°30′55″W

Links
- Webcast: Listen live
- Website: www.klove.com

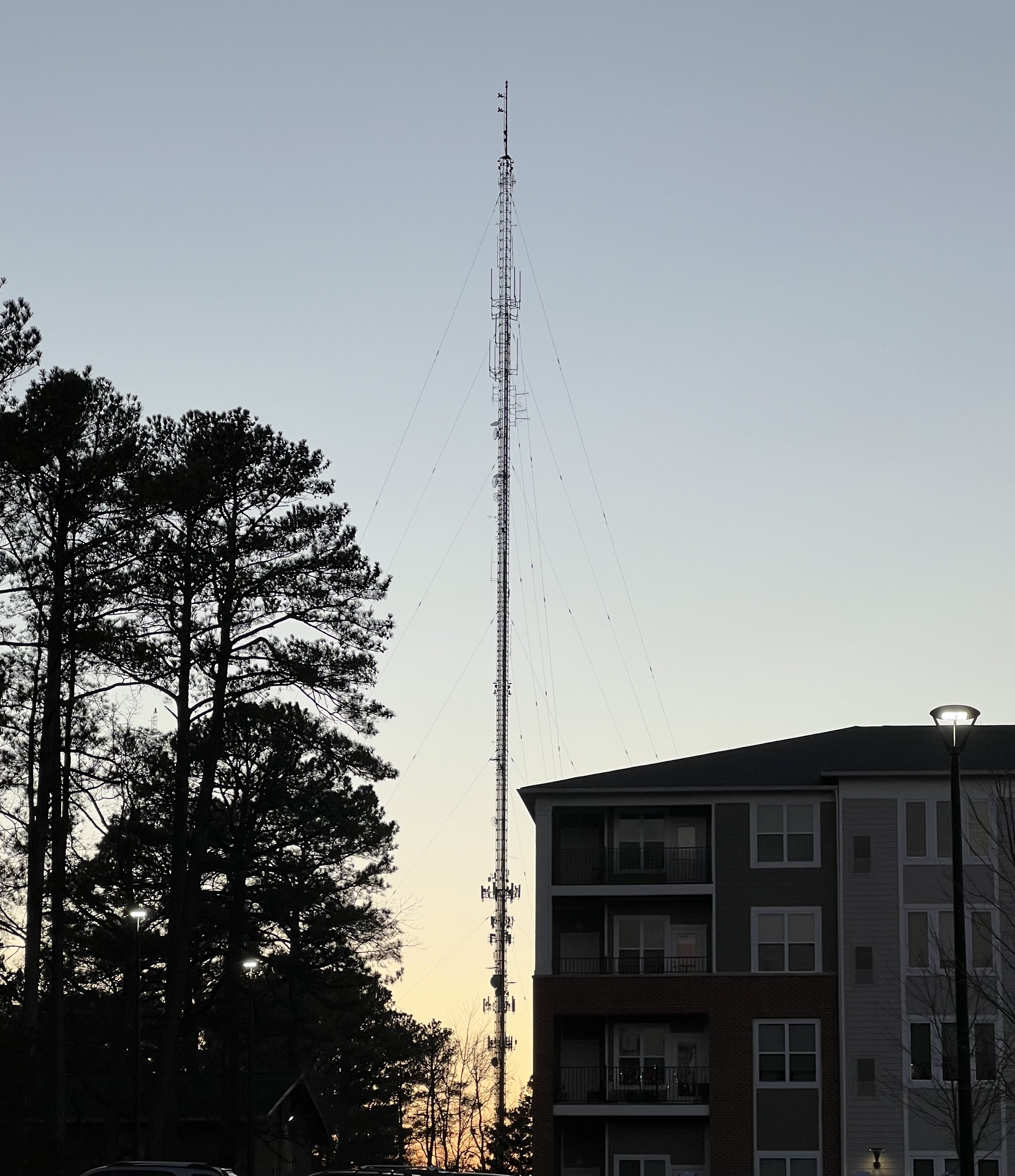
A radio tower in Dumbarton, Virginia. It is used to transmit W291CL, WLFV, WRNL, and WXRL.

WLFV (98.9 MHz) is a commercial FM radio station, licensed to Midlothian, Virginia, and serving the Greater Richmond Region. The station is branded as "K-Love" and features a contemporary Christian format. The station is owned by Educational Media Foundation. WLFV's transmitter is off Basie Road in Henrico, Virginia.

== History ==
WJMA-FM signed on November 22, 1971, on 96.7 MHz from Orange, Virginia. It was co-owned with WJMA (1340 AM, now WVCV). In 2003, the station ended up in the hands of Maniquad Communications, which at the time was the owner of rimshots WBBT-FM in Powhatan and WARV-FM in Petersburg. Maniquad filed to move WJMA-FM to 98.9 FM in Richmond proper, and the station began broadcasting from its new facilities in March 2005.

Prior to becoming K-Love in 2017, WLFV was owned by Alpha Media. The station featured a country music format branded as "The Wolf," and was simulcast on co-owned WARV-FM. On December 5, 2016, Educational Media Foundation (EMF) filed an application with the FCC to purchase both WLFV and WARV-FM for $2 million.

On March 22, 2017, following the consummation of EMF's purchase, WLFV began stunting, directing listeners to sister station WWLB (the classic country-formatted "Hank FM"). On March 23, 2017, WLFV went silent in advance of its impending flip to K-Love.

WLFV remained off the air for three weeks while EMF repaired a failed satellite dish mount. Finally, on April 14, 2017, WLFV returned to the airwaves as K-Love. Despite the change in ownership and format, the station retained its WLFV call letters.
