= WDZY =

- Colonial Heights, Virginia; United States
- Broadcast area: Central Virginia; Northern Virginia
- Frequency: 1290 kHz

Programming
- Format: Conservative Religious

Ownership
- Owner: Wilkins Radio Network, Inc.; (Richmond Christian Radio Corporation)

History
- First air date: 1955
- Former call signs: WHAE (1954, CP); WCLA (1954–1957); WPVA (1957–1986); WHUM (1986–1987); WPVA (1987–1989); WSTK (1989–1997); WZOD (1997–1998)
- Call sign meaning: "Disney" former owner

Technical information
- Licensing authority: FCC
- Facility ID: 21723
- Class: D
- Power: 25,000 watts (day); 41 watts (night)
- Transmitter coordinates: 37°15′30.0″N 77°23′40.0″W

Links
- Public license information: Public file; LMS
- Webcast: WDZY 1290 Listen live; WDZY 103.3 Listen live
- Website: WDZY 1290 Online; WDZY 103.3 Online

WDZY (1290 kHz) is a conservative Religious formatted broadcast AM radio station licensed to Colonial Heights, Virginia, serving the Petersburg/Richmond area. WDZY is owned and operated by Wilkins Radio Network, Inc.

== History ==
The station went on the air as WCLA in 1955, later to become WPVA. On November 13, 1989, the station changed its call sign to WSTK. On March 19, 1997, it changed to WZOD. On February 19, 1998, it changed to the current WDZY. On the same day, WDZY became an affiliate of Radio Disney.

== Sale and falling silent ==
In June 2013, The Walt Disney Company put WDZY and six other Radio Disney stations in medium markets up for sale, to refocus the network's broadcast distribution on top-25 markets.

On September 29, 2013, WDZY dropped the Radio Disney affiliation and went silent. In November, Disney filed to sell WDZY to the Richmond Christian Radio Corporation, a subsidiary of Wilkins Radio Network, Inc.

The sale was "consummated" on December 31, 2013 and "accepted" by the FCC on January 10, 2014. WDZY resumed operations on January 17, 2014.

== Translator ==
In addition to the main station, WDZY is relayed by an FM translator to widen its broadcast area.

Call sign	Frequency	City of license	FID	ERP (W)	HAAT	Class	FCC info
W277CT	103.3 FM	Petersburg, Virginia	18868	250 watts	96 m (315 ft)	D	LMS
