= WURV =

Radio station in Richmond, Virginia

- Richmond, Virginia; United States
- Broadcast area: Richmond–Petersburg–Central Virginia
- Frequency: 103.7 MHz (HD Radio)
- Branding: Hot 103.7

Programming
- Format: Top 40 (CHR)
- Subchannels: HD2: ESPN 106.1 (Sports); HD3: RadioIQ (NPR, BBC)
- Affiliations: Premiere Networks

Ownership
- Owner: SummitMedia; (HD3 and W223AZ leased to Virginia Tech); (SM-WURV, LLC)
- Sister stations: W291CL, WKHK, WKLR, WJSR, W282CA

History
- First air date: December 23, 1961; 64 years ago
- Former call signs: WFMV (1961–1969); WEZS (1969–1988); WMXB (1988–2010)
- Call sign meaning: "River" (former branding)

Technical information
- Licensing authority: FCC
- Facility ID: 37230
- Class: B
- ERP: 20,000 watts
- HAAT: 256 meters (840 ft)
- Transmitter coordinates: 37°30′31.5″N 77°34′35.9″W
- Translators: HD2: 106.1 W291CL (Richmond); HD3: 92.5 W223AZ (Richmond)

Links
- Public license information: Public file; LMS
- Webcast: Listen live
- Website: www.hot1037.com

WURV (103.7 FM "Hot 103.7") is a commercial radio station licensed to Richmond, Virginia. The station is owned by SummitMedia, through licensee SM-WURV, LLC. WURV broadcasts a Top 40 (CHR) music format to the Richmond/Petersburg/Central Virginia radio market.

WURV's studios and offices are on Moorefield Park Drive in Richmond. The transmitter is off Old Bon Air Road, also in Richmond. WURV broadcasts in the HD Radio (hybrid) format. Its HD2 subchannel runs an all sports format, which is simulcast on translator station 106.1 W291CL as "Sports 106.1". WURV's HD3 subchannel simulcasts Virginia Tech's public radio station 89.1 WVTF from Roanoke, Virginia. It feeds translator station 92.5 W223AZ, which is owned by Virginia Tech.

== History ==
=== WFMV ===
On December 23, 1961, the station first signed on the air as WFMV. It was owned by Professional Broadcasting, Inc. and aired a classical music format, operating as the first stereo radio station in Richmond.

WFMV was one of several Richmond FM stations receiving permission from the Federal Communications Commission for unusually high power. Today, Richmond is in Zone 1, limited to a maximum of 50,000 watts effective radiated power (ERP). Before current class power limits were drafted in 1964, however, WFMV was permitted to operate at 73,800 watts, WRNL-FM (now WRXL) broadcast at 120,000 watts, and, to this day, 94.5 WRVQ (then WRVA-FM) is grandfathered at 200,000 watts.

In 1964, WFMV was sold to the Fidelity Bankers Life Insurance Company. Fidelity moved WFMV's studios to its suburban headquarters at Willow Lawn in Henrico County. For a time, it was co-managed with WGOE, a 1,000-watt AM daytime station owned by brothers Major and J. Sargeant Reynolds.

Benjamin F. Thomas acquired WFMV in 1967 for $60,000; Thomas owned part of WKSL, an FM station in Greencastle, Pennsylvania. Thomas relocated the WFMV studios into two used office trailers at the rural transmitter site. The remote location was on a dirt road through the woods; during rain and snow, it was often accessible only by foot.

Thomas had financial problems, and employees, mostly college students, were bolstered by loyal listeners and continued to man the station even when payrolls were late and inclement weather blocked access to the site. Engineering staff from nearby stations, notably the well-funded WRVA ("The 50,000-watt Voice of Virginia"), loaned parts and repair talent to help maintain the aging transmitting equipment. Although privately owned, WFMV had become something of a community effort.

=== Beautiful music WEZS ===
While WFMV had a loyal following as a classical music outlet, it was not a high-profit venture. In 1969, EZ Communications bought WFMV. As the name implies, the new owners specialized in FM stations airing an easy listening format. That triggered protests from listeners, fearing WFMV's fine arts programming would disappear. A group was formed calling themselves "Save Fine Music", which opposed the station's sale. WFMV made arrangements with a non-commercial Richmond station, 106.5 WRFK, to take over its classical music library and expand the hours it played classical works, while 103.7's sale was approved and the station became beautiful music as WEZS.

The easy format was popular through the 1970s, but by 1980, beautiful music had become less appealing to youthful and middle-aged listeners which advertisers usually seek. WEZS responded by adding more vocals to its largely instrumental playlist. Around 1983, the station made the complete transition to soft adult contemporary music, eliminating nearly all instrumental titles, and rebranded as "EZ104".

=== Adult contemporary WMXB ===
In an effort to shake its "easy" image, in July 1988, the station switched its call sign and branding to WMXB, "B-103". In August 1989, EZ sold the station to Ragan Henry Broadcasting of Philadelphia. In February 1990, the station was sold to Radio Ventures which moved WMXB into a more up-tempo mainstream adult contemporary format, dropping softer acts like The Carpenters and Barry Manilow for more up-tempo artists like Gloria Estefan, Ace of Base, and Bruce Springsteen. Liberty Broadcasting (in which entertainer Merv Griffin was an investor) took over the station in 1993, and the format became hot adult contemporary under veteran programmer Steve Davis, adding more contemporary titles as well as vintage Top 40 hits from the 1980s.

In the 1990s, WMXB's transmitter was relocated to a new tower, more than doubling its height above average terrain (HAAT) to 750 feet. That was coupled with a decrease in effective radiated power to 18,500 watts. Despite the lower wattage, the taller tower gave WMXB a similar coverage area.

In 1996, the station was sold to SFX Broadcasting, and the station shifted to a more modern AC format that included such artists as No Doubt, Collective Soul and Alanis Morissette, which was starting to take off in popularity around that time. The station ownership went thru several corporate mergers, from SFX, to Capstar, and finally AMFM. When AMFM merged with Clear Channel in 2000, WMXB, along with several other stations owned by both AMFM and Clear Channel, was spun off to Cox Radio, who adjusted the station back to a mainstream Hot AC format.

On March 22, 2004, the station dumped the hot AC format and "B-103" moniker for a soft AC format that leaned toward 1980s, 1990s, and current titles, and rebranded as "Mix 103.7".

On April 16, 2007, WMXB relaunched as a hot AC station with a more current and upbeat focus, while retaining the "Mix" branding.

=== The River ===
On April 22, 2010, at 3 pm, WMXB flipped to adult album alternative, branded as "103.7 The River". Along with the flip, the station adopted the new call sign WURV, with "RV" standing for "River", an allusion to the James River that flows through Richmond. The first song on "The River" was "Learn to Fly" by the Foo Fighters. At the same time, sister station WDYL (now WJSR) began redirecting listeners to WURV in preparation of a format flip to Rhythmic Top 40 a week after WURV's debut.

On July 20, 2012, Cox Radio announced the sale of WURV and 22 other stations to Summit Media LLC for $66.25 million. The sale was consummated on May 3, 2013.

=== Play and Your Variety ===
On September 24, 2013, WURV returned to hot AC, branded as "103.7 Play". On March 4, 2021, WURV rebranded as "103.7 Your Variety", with no change in format.

=== Hot 103.7 ===
On March 4, 2026, WURY changed their format from hot adult contemporary to Top 40/CHR, branded as "Hot 103.7".

== Sources ==
- Fisher, Mark D. (2005). "A Brief History of WFMV: Virginia's first stereophonic good music station". Richmond, VA: Richmond Radio Group.
- White, Thomas H. "Washington, D.C. AM Station History".
