= WPER (FM) =

- Fredericksburg, Virginia; United States
- Broadcast area: Central Virginia; Fredericksburg, Virginia; Richmond, Virginia
- Frequency: 90.5 MHz

Programming
- Format: Christian hot adult contemporary

Ownership
- Owner: Baker Family Stations; (Positive Alternative Radio, Inc.)
- Sister stations: WPIR, WPZR, WMXH-FM

History
- First air date: May 6, 1983
- Former call signs: WJYJ (1982–2018); WPIR (2018)

Technical information
- Licensing authority: FCC
- Facility ID: 18852
- Class: B
- ERP: 47,000 watts
- HAAT: 127.4 meters (418 ft)
- Transmitter coordinates: 37°57′56.0″N 77°22′19.0″W
- Translator: See § Translators

Links
- Public license information: Public file; LMS
- Webcast: WPER Webstream
- Website: WPER Online

WPER is a Christian hot adult contemporary–formatted broadcast radio station licensed to Fredericksburg, Virginia, United States, serving Fredericksburg and Richmond. WPER is simulcast over a network of stations and translators across Virginia. WPER is owned and operated by Baker Family Stations.

== Call sign ==
On February 13, 2018, Baker Family Stations swapped the long-time call sign for their Fredericksburg station, WJYJ, with the call sign for their Hickory, NC station, WPIR. A week later, Baker again swapped the now-WPIR's call sign with that of sister station WPER.

== Translators ==
In addition to its primary signal, WPER is relayed by six FM translators to widen its broadcast area across Virginia.

Broadcast translators for WPER
| Call sign | Frequency | City of license | FID | ERP (W) | HAAT | Class | FCC info |
|---|---|---|---|---|---|---|---|
| W292EF | 106.3 FM | Fredericksburg, Virginia | 142780 | 75 | 100 m (328 ft) | D | LMS |
| W298BR | 107.5 FM | Harrisonburg, Virginia | 141360 | 10 | 127 m (417 ft) | D | LMS |
| W261CN | 100.1 FM | Williamsburg, Virginia | 18874 | 19 | 99.3 m (326 ft) | D | LMS |
| W292CI | 106.3 FM | Winchester, Virginia | 18870 | 10 | 432 m (1,417 ft) | D | LMS |
| W209BY | 89.7 FM | Woodbridge, Virginia | 155019 | 8 | 113 m (371 ft) | D | LMS |

Broadcast translator for WKLR-HD3
| Call sign | Frequency | City of license | FID | ERP (W) | HAAT | Class | FCC info |
|---|---|---|---|---|---|---|---|
| W273BB | 102.5 FM | Richmond, Virginia | 139558 | 99 | 117 m (384 ft) | D | LMS |
