= WWLB =

- Ettrick, Virginia; United States
- Broadcast area: Petersburg, Virginia; Richmond, Virginia
- Frequency: 93.1 MHz
- Branding: VPM Music

Programming
- Format: Public radio

Ownership
- Owner: VPM Media Corporation
- Sister stations: WBBT-FM; WCVE-FM; WCVE-TV

History
- First air date: 2001 (as WJZV)
- Former call signs: WJZV (2000–2006); WLFV (2006–2014)
- Call sign meaning: "Liberty" (former branding of 98.9 FM)

Technical information
- Licensing authority: FCC
- Facility ID: 76313
- Class: A
- ERP: 5,200 watts
- HAAT: 106 meters (348 ft)
- Transmitter coordinates: 37°16′21.5″N 77°33′58″W

Links
- Public license information: Public file; LMS
- Webcast: Listen live
- Website: vpm.org

WWLB (93.1 FM) is a non-commercial broadcast radio station licensed to Ettrick, Virginia, serving the Petersburg–Richmond area. WWLB is owned and operated by VPM Media Corporation. Along with sister station WBBT-FM in Powhatan, the station is branded as VPM Music, and is a companion service of the area's flagship NPR station, WCVE-FM. WWLB serves the southern portion of the Richmond market, while WBBT serves the northern portion.

== History ==
On October 20, 2014, WLFV changed their format from country (as "The Wolf"), which moved to sister station WWLB (98.9 FM), to classic country, branded as "93.1 Hank FM". The following day, the FCC authorized a swap of callsigns between the stations at 93.1 FM (now WWLB) and 98.9 FM (now WLFV).

On December 20, 2017, Commonwealth Public Broadcasting Corporation announced that they would acquire WWLB and WBBT-FM from Alpha Media, with the intention of moving WCVE-FM's music programming to the stations. The purchase closed on February 15, 2018. On June 1, 2018, WWLB and WBBT-FM switched to a new format, "WCVE Music", which assumes and augments the prior music programming of WCVE-FM. On August 5, 2019, WWLB and WBBT-FM were both rebranded as "VPM Music".
