= VPM Media Corporation =

Public broadcasting organization in Virginia, United States

- Formation: 1961; 65 years ago
- Headquarters: Richmond, Virginia
- Fields: Public broadcasting
- Official language: English
- Website: www.vpm.org

The VPM Media Corporation, formerly known as the Commonwealth Public Broadcasting Corporation and Central Virginia Educational Television Corporation, is a 501(c)(3) non-profit organization that is the group owner of Public Broadcasting Service (PBS) member public television stations and National Public Radio (NPR) member stations in central and western Virginia. The organization is based in Richmond, Virginia. VPM Media is owned by the Virginia Foundation for Public Media.

The stations were originally branded under the blanket name Community Idea Stations. As of May 2018, organizational funding was primarily private with only 9% from The Corporation for Public Broadcasting with the private split evenly between individuals and corporations and no state funding.

== History ==
Central Virginia Educational Television Corp. was founded in 1961. The corporation was first led by Bill Spiller, who was general manager of WCVE-TV in 1964.

The broadcaster gained two stations in Northern Virginia in the 1970s, WNVT and WNVC, which were programmed with PBS and K-12 educational programming. In the mid-1990s, the programming was switched to international programming (eventually programmed by a third party) due to PBS duplication and federal funding reductions.

Central Virginia Educational TV in 1988 received from Union Theological Seminary its WRFK radio station, which was given new call sign, WCVE-FM. No longer just in TV, the nonprofit renamed itself to the Central Virginia Educational Telecommunications Corp. In 1991, Charles Sydnor replaced Spiller as president.

In 2006, A. Curtis Monk became president and chief executive officer replacing Syndor. Central Virginia built in 2007 two radio stations in outlying areas, the Northern Neck (WCNV) and Chase City (WMVE). Virginia State stopped sending funding to the nonprofit.

The corporation sold some of its Northern Virginia broadcast spectrum in 2017 for $181.9 million. Plans for the additional money, including sale of the two stations property, were to form a foundation to assist with programing and community mission. By August 2018, Commonwealth used the bulk of the proceeds to form the Virginia Foundation for Public Media. In August, a reorganization took place making the foundation the parent company of Commonwealth Public Broadcasting. Since the station managers would report to the foundation's CEO, the Commonwealth's CEO position was eliminated.

Alpha Media sold the nonprofit on February 15, 2018, WBBT-FM (1980s hits) and WWLB (classic country) radio stations in the Richmond market. In May 2019, WCVE-FM programming was split with WCVE retaining news and music migrating to the two new stations under the WCVE Music branding.

In July 2019, it was announced that all of the broadcaster's stations would adopt the new name VPM (Virginia Public Media) on August 5, 2019.

On February 24, 2022, VPM launched its first news program: VPM News Focal Point. In January 2023 a weekly collaboration between VPM News and Richmond BizSense, BizSense Beat, that airs during NPR's Morning Edition each Friday.

== TV ==
=== PBS ===
- WCVE-TV channel 23 and WCVW channel 57, Richmond
- WHTJ channel 41, Charlottesville (satellite of WCVE-TV)
- WVPT channel 51, Staunton–Harrisonburg (satellite of WCVE-TV) and WVPY channel 51.2, New Market–Harrisonburg (satellite of WCVW)

=== World Channel ===
- WNVT channel 23.3, Spotsylvania Courthouse–Richmond
- WNVC channel 41.3, Culpeper–Charlottesville (satellite of WNVT)

== Radio ==
- WCVE-FM 88.9, Richmond, Virginia
  - WCNV 89.1, Heathsville, Virginia
  - WMVE 90.1, Chase City, Virginia
- WBBT-FM 107.3, Powhatan, Virginia
- WWLB 93.1, Ettrick, Virginia

== See also ==
- MHz Networks (former multicultural subsidiary of Commonwealth Public Broadcasting Corporation)
