= Virginia Tech Foundation =

American nonprofit nonstock corporation (1948–

- Abbreviation: VTF
- Established: 1948
- Type: 501(c)(3) nonprofit, nonstock corporation
- Tax ID no.: 54-0721690
- Registration no.: 00573329
- Headquarters: Blacksburg, Virginia, U.S.
- CEO: Elizabeth A. McClanahan
- Affiliations: Virginia Tech
- Website: vtf.org

The Virginia Tech Foundation (VTF) is a 501(c)(3) nonprofit nonstock corporation established in 1948 to receive, manage, and disburse private gifts in support of Virginia Polytechnic Institute and State University programs. The purpose of the foundation is to manage private funds given for the support of the university, and to foster and promote the growth, progress and general welfare of the university. The Virginia Tech Foundation is governed by a 35-member Board of Directors and 4 ex-officio positions: the President of Virginia Tech, the Rector of the Board of Visitors, the President of the VT Alumni Association, and the President of the Virginia Tech Athletic Fund.

== Mission ==
The Virginia Tech Foundation, Inc. was established in 1948 to receive, manage, and disburse private gifts in support of Virginia Tech's programs. The purpose of the foundation is to manage private funds given for the support of the Virginia Tech, and to foster and promote the growth, progress and general welfare of the university.

== Subsidiaries ==
- Virginia Tech Corporate Research Center The (CRC) is adjacent to Virginia Tech's campus and is home to more than 160+ research and development businesses and research centers and employs is more than 2,700 people. In 2010, the CRC was named Outstanding Research/Science Park Award given by the Association of University Research Parks.
- Hotel Roanoke A member of the Historic Hotels of America program administered by the National Trust for Historic Preservation. Hotel Roanoke was first opened in 1882, and was donated to the foundation in 1989 by the Norfolk Southern Corporation. Today it serves as the area's premier hotel and conference center. The Hotel is operated under contract by Doubletree Hotels.
- WVTF A National Public Radio affiliate, WVTF broadcasts to nearly 1.4 million people throughout much of Virginia and portions of North Carolina, Tennessee, and West Virginia. WVTF also operates the Radio IQ public radio service in the New River Valley.
- The Steger Center for International Scholarship Located in Riva San Vitale, Switzerland The Steger Center offers semester-long and summer study abroad programs for undergraduate and graduate students.
- Pete Dye River Course A golf course designed by Pete Dye along the New River. The course also serves as a turf care center and teaching/training center for the Virginia Tech Golf Team.

== See also ==
- Virginia Tech
- Hotel Roanoke
- Virginia Tech Corporate Research Center
- Virginia Tech National Capital Region
- WVTF
- Radio IQ
