= WCVE-FM =

- Richmond, Virginia; United States
- Broadcast area: Greater Richmond Region
- Frequency: 88.9 MHz (HD Radio)
- Branding: VPM News

Programming
- Format: Public news/talk
- Affiliations: National Public Radio; American Public Media

Ownership
- Owner: VPM Media Corporation
- Sister stations: WCVE-TV; WCVW-TV; WWLB; WBBT-FM

History
- First air date: May 8, 1988
- Former frequencies: 101.1 FM (1988–1990)
- Call sign meaning: "Central Virginia Educational"

Technical information
- Licensing authority: FCC
- Facility ID: 10016
- Class: B
- ERP: 10,000 watts
- HAAT: 302 meters (991 ft)
- Transmitter coordinates: 37°34′45.5″N 77°36′5″W

Links
- Public license information: Public file; LMS
- Webcast: Listen live
- Website: vpm.org/news

WCVE-FM ("VPM News", 88.9 MHz) is a public radio station licensed to Richmond, Virginia, serving the Greater Richmond Region. WCVE-FM is owned and operated by Commonwealth Public Broadcasting Corporation. CPBC also owns Channel 23 WCVE-TV, the PBS member station in Richmond, as well as other TV and FM stations in Virginia.

WCVE-FM broadcasts two channels in the HD Radio format.

Two additional stations, WWLB (93.1 FM) and WBBT-FM 107.3, broadcast classical and specialty music programming to Richmond under the brand "VPM Music". WWLB serves the southern portion of the market, while WBBT serves the northern portion. Two stations in outlying areas originally built as repeaters of WCVE-FM, WCNV (89.1 FM) in Heathsville and WMVE (90.1 FM) in Chase City, now air programming from both networks.

== History ==
=== WRFK ===
In May 1957, the Union Theological Seminary of Richmond (now known as the Union Presbyterian Seminary) signed on an FM radio station at 90.1, WRFK. Its non-commercial schedule of classical music, religion and talk programs proved to be popular. The station relocated to 106.5 in the 1960s and boosted its power, first to 16,000 watts, and later 50,000 watts, covering all of Richmond and its suburbs. When National Public Radio debuted in the 1970s, WRFK became the organization's member for Richmond, airing programs such as All Things Considered. It operated as a noncommercial broadcaster despite being on a commercial frequency.

In the late 1980s, the seminary discovered that its charter did not allow it to operate a radio station and put WRFK on the market. It initially reached a deal to sell the station to the Federated Arts Council. However, it opted to take a larger offer from a commercial broadcaster. Meanwhile, Richmond's PBS member, WCVE-TV, which signed on in 1964, expressed an interest in operating a public radio station as a companion to Channel 23. With the help of interested businessmen and lawmakers who wanted to see the NPR/fine arts format preserved in Richmond, Commonwealth Public Broadcasting won a radio license.

=== WCVE-FM ===
In 1988, WRFK was sold to The Daytona Group of Virginia, Inc. The station switched to a commercial adult contemporary format as WVMX (now urban contemporary station WBTJ). WRFK signed off for the last time on May 6, 1988. Soon afterward, WCVE-FM signed on from 101.1 FM as Richmond's new NPR member station. Most of WRFK's staff transferred to WCVE-FM, along with nearly all of WRFK's programming and music library.

In the summer of 1989, a new commercial allocation was granted at 101.1. By the following year, WCVE-FM had moved to its current home at 88.9 FM. Its effective radiated power was 8,300 watts, with its transmitter at the WCVE-TV tower, at 840 feet in height above average terrain. It originally aired classical music much of the day, with some NPR programs, jazz and local news. With the expansion of NPR's schedule in the 1990s, more NPR shows were added, to the point where the station became all news and information on weekdays, with music heard at night and on weekends.

In the early 2000s, WCVE-FM nearly doubled its power, to 17,500 watts, from the same 840-foot tower. In the 2010s, the station reduced its power to 10,000 watts, coupled with an increase in antenna height, now at 990 feet (300 meters). That gives WCVE-FM the same coverage but at less power due to the use of a taller tower.

=== News and music split ===
On December 20, 2017, Commonwealth Public Broadcasting Corporation announced that they would acquire stations WBBT-FM 107.3 and WWLB (93.1 FM) from Alpha Media. As part of the purchase, the station would move its music programming to the new acquisitions. WCVE-FM began simulcasting on the two new stations on February 15, 2018; on June 1, 2018, WCVE-FM rebranded as "WCVE News", while the two new stations became "WCVE Music". WCNV and WMVE, WCVE-FM's existing repeaters, began airing programs from both services. On August 5, 2019, WCVE-FM was rebranded as "VPM News" while both WBBT-FM and WWLB were rebranded as "VPM Music".

== Network ==
WCVE-FM built two full-powered repeaters in 2007 to serve outlying parts of its coverage area. As they are the only public radio stations in their broadcast areas, these stations are split between the VPM News and VPM Music networks; news airs in morning and evening drive times on weekdays, while music takes the rest of the day and weekends.

| Call sign | Frequency (MHz) | City of license | Facility ID | Class | ERP (W) | Height (m (ft)) | Transmitter coordinates |
|---|---|---|---|---|---|---|---|
| WCNV | 89.1 | Heathsville, Virginia | 90292 | A | 3,800 | 97 m (318 ft) | 37°54′22.5″N 76°29′7.8″W |
| WMVE | 90.1 | Chase City, Virginia | 90273 | C3 | 8,000 | 113 m (371 ft) | 36°46′29.5″N 78°20′40.0″W |
