= Washington Nationals Radio Network =

Radio network broadcasting Washington Nationals baseball games

The Washington Nationals radio network is a United States radio network airing Washington Nationals baseball games in the mid-Atlantic region of the United States. The Washington Nationals Radio Network consists of 13 full-powered stations (12 AM, 1 FM) supplemented by 11 analog AM-to-FM translators and 5 digital HD subchannels. The flagship is WJFK-FM, while Spanish-language broadcasts are heard on WFAX and its translators.

The Nationals' broadcast team consists of play-by-play announcer Charlie Slowes and color announcer Dave Jageler. Additionally, Byron Kerr hosts "Nats Insider", and Phil Wood hosts "Nats Talk Live".

== Network stations ==
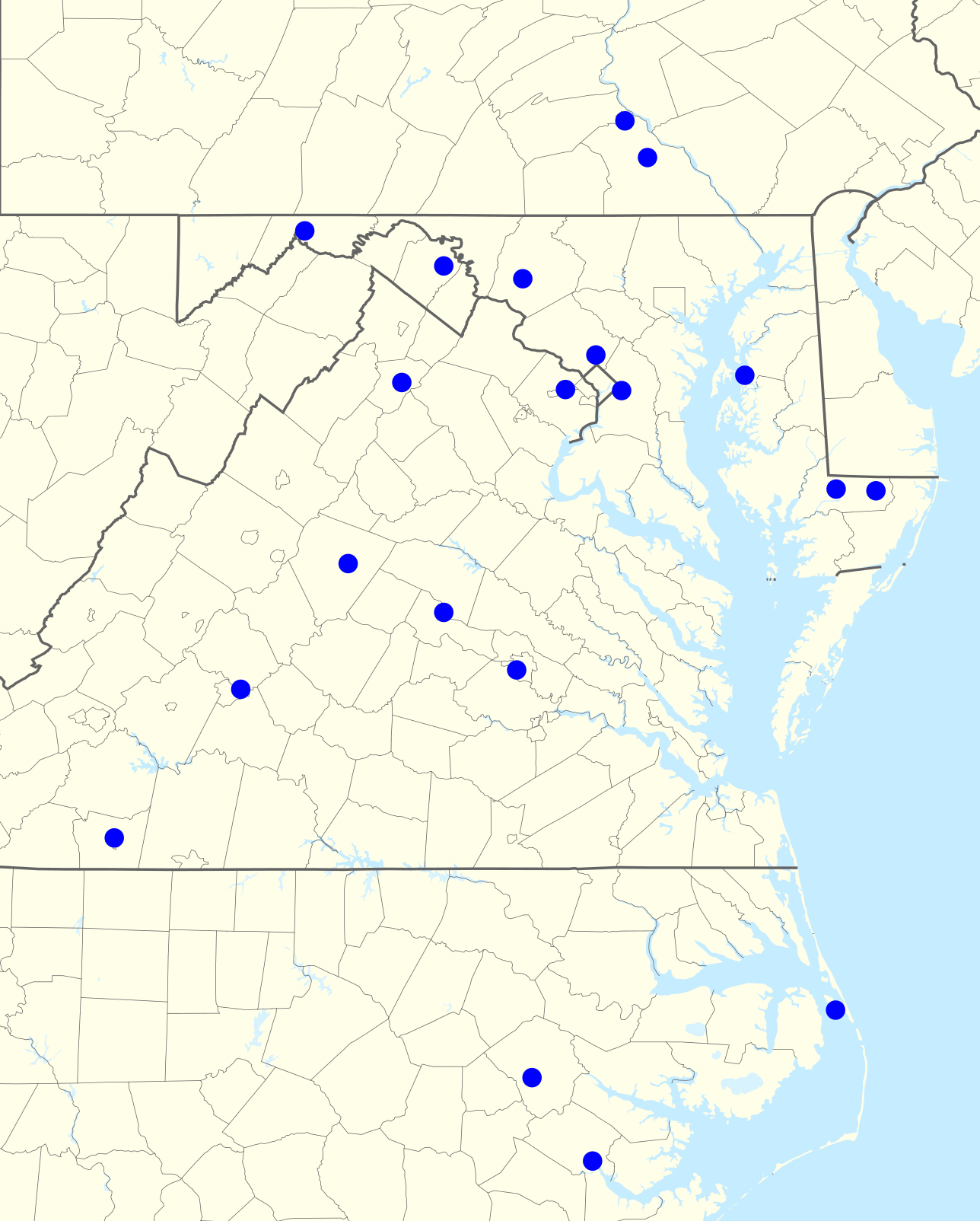
Map of radio affiliates in 2015

=== Maryland (3 stations + 2 HD subchannels + 2 translators) ===
- Bethesda (Washington, D.C. market): WIAD-HD3 94.7-3 (relay of WJFK-FM)
- Cumberland: WCMD 1230
  - Cumberland: W271AT 102.1
- Frederick: WSHE 820
  - Frederick: W232DG 94.3
- Frederick: WTLP-HD2 103.9-2 (relay of WFED)
- Thurmont: WTHU 1450

=== North Carolina (1 station + 1 translator) ===
- New Bern: WWNB 1490
  - New Bern: W280ED 103.9

=== Virginia (7 stations + 2 HD subchannels + 7 translators) ===
- Falls Church: WFAX 1220 (Spanish flagship)
  - Falls Church: W284DB 100.7
  - Reston: W288BS 105.5
- Front Royal: WFTR 1450
- Lynchburg: WBRG 1050
  - Lynchburg: W286CX 105.1
- Manassas (Washington, D.C. market): WJFK-FM 106.7 (flagship)
- Richmond: WRVA 1140
  - Richmond: WTVR-FM-HD2 98.1-2
  - Richmond: W241AP 96.1
- Richmond: WRNL 910 (backup)
  - Richmond: WRVQ-HD2 94.5-2
  - Richmond: W286DJ 105.1
- Staunton: WTON 1240
  - Crozet (Charlottesville market): W266BQ 101.1
  - Harrisonburg: W255DS 98.9

=== Washington, D.C. (1 station + 1 HD subchannel) ===
- WFED 1500
  - WTOP-FM-HD2 103.5-2

=== West Virginia (1 station + 1 translator) ===
- Martinsburg: WRNR 740
  - Martinsburg: W293AM 106.5

== See also ==
- List of XM Satellite Radio channels
- List of Sirius Satellite Radio stations
- List of Washington Nationals broadcasters
