= List of colleges and universities in the Greater Richmond Region =

The Greater Richmond Region is a region and metropolitan area in the U.S. state of Virginia, centered on Richmond, the state capital. The U.S. Office of Management and Budget (OMB) defines the area as the Richmond, VA Metropolitan Statistical Area, a Metropolitan Statistical Area (MSA) used by the U.S. Census Bureau and other entities. The OMB defines the area as comprising 17 county-level jurisdictions, including the independent cities of Richmond, Petersburg, Hopewell, and Colonial Heights. As of 2016, it had a population of 1,263,617, making it the 45th largest MSA in the country.

The Greater Richmond Region is home to several major universities throughout the Commonwealth of Virginia. This is a list of colleges and universities in the city of Richmond and Greater Richmond Region.

== Public universities ==
Name	Location	Enrollment	Founded	Athletic affiliation (conference)
Virginia Commonwealth University	Richmond	28,919	1838	NCAA Division I (Atlantic 10 Conference)
Virginia State University	Ettrick	4,713	1882	NCAA Division II (CIAA)

== Private universities ==
Name	Location	Enrollment	Founded	Athletic affiliation (conference)
Bon Secours Memorial College of Nursing	Richmond	500	1961	—
Randolph–Macon College	Ashland	1,543	1830	NCAA Division III (Old Dominion Athletic Conference)
Union Presbyterian Seminary	Richmond	180	1812	—
University of Richmond	Richmond	3,914	1840	NCAA Division I (Atlantic 10 Conference)
Virginia Union University	Richmond	1,700	1865	NCAA Division II (CIAA)

== Two-year institutions ==
Name	Satellite campus	Founded	Enrollment
Brightpoint Community College	Chester	1967	13,890
J. Sargeant Reynolds Community College	Glen Allen	1972	17,604
Richard Bland College	Prince George, Virginia	1960	1,386

== Universities with satellite campuses ==
Several in-state universities have satellite campuses or offices in the Greater Richmond Region given the Commonwealth's status as the capital.

University	Main location	Satellite campus location	Affiliated program	Ref.
Bluefield University	Bluefield, Virginia	Dumbarton	Bluefield University Richmond Office	
Bryant & Stratton College	Buffalo, New York	Manchester	Richmond campus	
Centura College	Virginia Beach, Virginia	Bon Air	Richmond campus	
George Mason University	Fairfax, Virginia	Richmond	Office of State Government Relations	
Mary Baldwin University	Staunton, Virginia	Laurel	Richmond campus	
Old Dominion University	Norfolk, Virginia	Glen Allen	Idea Fusion	
South University	Savannah, Georgia	Short Pump	Richmond campus	
University of Virginia	Charlottesville, Virginia	Henrico	School of Continuing and Professional Studies	
Virginia Tech	Blacksburg, Virginia	Henrico	Virginia Tech Richmond Center	

== See also ==
- List of colleges and universities in Virginia
