= WRXL-HD2 =

Digital subchannel of Richmond radio station WRXL (102.1 FM)

Digital subchannel of WRXL, Richmond

Richmond, Virginia; United States
- Broadcast area: Central Virginia
- Frequency: 102.1 MHz · HD2 (HD Radio)
- Branding: Big 98.5

Programming
- Language: English
- Format: Country music

Ownership
- Owner: Audacy, Inc.; (Audacy License, LLC)
- Sister stations: WBTJ; WRNL; WRVA; WRVQ; WRXL; WTVR-FM (HD2)

History
- First air date: c. 2013; 12 years ago

Technical information
- Licensing authority: FCC
- Facility ID: 11961
- Class: B
- ERP: 20,000 watts
- HAAT: 241 meters (791 ft)
- Transmitter coordinates: 37°36′52.0″N 77°30′56.0″W
- Translator(s): 98.5 W253BI (Glen Allen)

Links
- Public license information: Public file; LMS
- Webcast: Listen live (via Audacy)
- Website: www.audacy.com/big985country

WRXL-HD2 (102.1-2 FM) – branded Big 98.5 – is a digital subchannel of Richmond, Virginia radio station WRXL (102.1 FM). Owned by Audacy, Inc., WRXL-HD2 functions as a commercial country music radio station, serving Greater Richmond and much of surrounding Central Virginia. Using the proprietary technology HD Radio for its main digital transmission, WRXL-HD2 also rebroadcasts over low-power analog Glen Allen translator W253BI (98.5 FM), and streams online via Audacy. The WRXL-HD2 studios, and transmitters for both WRXL-HD2 and W253BI, are located in the Richmond suburb of Dumbarton.

== History ==
In April 2013, Clear Channel Communications (now iHeartMedia) completed construction of the 98.5 FM translator in Glen Allen, Virginia. It was originally listed as a translator for WRVQ, which was later modified to use WTVR-FM.

Previous logo

On May 5, 2014, the station signed on as a simulcast of iHeartRadio's WRVA, using the branding "NewsRadio 1140 & 98.5 FM", and technically relaying WTVR-HD2. The simulcast ended on July 23, 2015, at 3 pm, after the end of that day's Rush Limbaugh show. The station then began stunting with construction noises, with liners telling WRVA listeners to move to 1140 AM, and to listen the following Monday, the 27th, at 9 am for something new on 98.5. At that time, 98.5 flipped to country as "Big 98.5", launching with 10,000 songs in a row. The first song on Big was "Kick the Dust Up" by Luke Bryan. As a translator is not legally permitted to originate its own programming, by U.S. Federal Communications Commission regulation, W253BI is relaying WRXL-HD2.

On November 1, 2017, iHeartMedia announced that WRXL-HD2/W253BI, along with all of their sister stations in Richmond and Chattanooga, will be sold to Entercom due to that company's merger with CBS Radio. The sale was completed on December 19, 2017.

=== FM Translator ===
Broadcast translator for WRXL-HD2
| Call sign | Frequency | City of license | FID | ERP (W) | HAAT | Class | Transmitter coordinates | FCC info |
|---|---|---|---|---|---|---|---|---|
| W253BI | 98.5 FM | Glen Allen, Virginia | 148159 | 250 | 220 m (722 ft) | D | 37°35′52.5″N 77°30′56.1″W | LMS |
