= WRVA =

WRVA may refer to:

- One of several broadcast stations in Richmond, Virginia:
  - WRVA (AM), a radio station (1140 AM)
  - WWBT, a television station (channel 12) which used the callsign WRVA-TV from 1956 through 1968
  - WRVQ, a radio station (94.5 FM) which used the callsign WRVA-FM from 1956 through 1972
- WRDU, a radio station (100.7 FM) licensed to Wake Forest, North Carolina, which used the callsign WRVA-FM from 2004 through 2013
- West Russian Volunteer Army, a Pro-German White Russian army that fought in the Russian Civil War.
