= WTVR =

WTVR may refer to:

- WTVR-TV, a television station (channel 23, virtual 6) licensed to Richmond, Virginia, United States
- WTVR-FM, a radio station (98.1 FM) licensed to Richmond, Virginia, United States
