= Elliot Segal =

American radio host (born 1969)

- Born: February 17, 1969 (age 57); Montreal, Quebec, Canada
- Presenting career
- Show: Elliot in the Morning
- Stations: WWDC, WRXL, WBWZ
- Time slot: 5:48–10:15AM (Monday–Friday)
- Style: Talk, comedy, shock jock
- Country: United States

Elliot Segal (born February 17, 1969) is an American talk radio host. His Elliot in the Morning show is broadcast on WWDC (FM) in Washington, D.C. and WRXL in Richmond, Virginia.

== Early life and education ==
Segal was born in Canada, and grew up in Houston, Texas. He is married and has two sons. He attended Houston Baptist University for a trimester, where he was a member of Alpha Tau Omega fraternity.

== Career ==
Segal is a radio morning DJ, well known for his unapologetic opinions and crude humor while discussing current events, entertainment, politics, sports, and crime stories. His trademark is a loud, maniacal laugh. He frequently uses catchphrases, each with its own colorful origins.

Segal is also involved with many local charities including Olie & Elliot's Great Saves with former Washington Capitals goalie, Olaf Kölzig, and the National Center for Missing and Exploited Children. He has, in the past, featured weekly interviews with America's Most Wanted producer, Donna Brant, to highlight specific cases from around the country, and has three captures attributed to these segments (through October 2007). He has also talked semi-regularly with John Walsh and has even appeared in a re-enactment on the show. In addition to these things, once upon finding out that the video game unit had been stolen by a parent from the children's ward of the hospital he was in with his son in 2006, Segal arranged for several new & used video game systems to be donated to the hospital via local merchants and listeners of his radio show.

Segal made a brief cameo in Nickelback's music video for the song Rockstar. He appears at 01:36 where he's put in a headlock by MMA fighter Chuck Liddell, and then again at 02:15 where he's mouthing the words to the song's chorus while alone on a bench.

WOR (AM) canceled Segal's show on February 18, 2014, after just one month on the air.

Segal was inducted into the Radio Hall of Fame on October 28, 2021. Fellow inductees include Dan Patrick and Kim Komando.

== Controversy ==
=== FCC fine for Bishop O'Connell High School incident ===
During the May 7, 2002 Elliot in the Morning show, two sixteen-year-old female students at Bishop O'Connell High School called the show to be considered in a contest whose winners were to be cage dancers at an upcoming Kid Rock concert at George Mason University's Patriot Center. Goaded by Segal, they discussed alleged sexual activity at school. The students, who claimed to be eighteen, discussed giving oral sex to lines of boys in the hallway and having intercourse in stairwells and closets. They implied these acts occurred during a typical school day. The students, who had used false names on air, were suspended the same day for their comments.

The principal addressed the student body on the PA system and discussed the immorality of Segal's radio show. Angered by the students' suspension, Segal personally insulted the principal on air the following day, making lewd remarks about his family and his sexual activity. He also mocked the school's mission statement, specifically what he considered to be a hypocritical statement that their educational environment is "rooted in the life of Christ."

The two days of broadcasting were ruled indecent by the Federal Communications Commission (FCC). In October 2003, DC101's parent company Clear Channel Communications was fined $55,000 as a result.
