= WAVQ =

WAVQ may refer to:

- WAVQ (AM), a radio station (1400 AM) licensed to serve Jacksonville, North Carolina, United States, which has held call sign WAVQ since February 2009
- WSTK, a radio station (104.5 FM) licensed to serve Aurora, North Carolina, United States, which held call sign WAVQ from November 2008 to February 2009
- WYBX, a radio station (89.3 FM) licensed to serve Key West, Florida, United States, which held call sign WAVQ from September 2002 to January 2006
- WPJC, a radio station (88.3 FM) licensed to serve Pontiac, Illinois, United States, which held call sign WAVQ from August 2000 to September 2002
- WXZC, a radio station (104.3 FM) licensed to serve Inglis, Florida, United States, which held call sign WAVQ from June 1993 to May 1998
