= WBTJ =

Urban radio station in Richmond, Virginia

- Richmond, Virginia; United States
- Broadcast area: Richmond, Virginia; Petersburg, Virginia
- Frequency: 106.5 MHz (HD Radio)
- Branding: 106.5 The Beat

Programming
- Language: English
- Format: Urban contemporary
- Affiliations: Premiere Networks

Ownership
- Owner: Audacy, Inc.; (Audacy License, LLC)
- Sister stations: WRNL; WRVA; WRVQ; WRXL (HD2); WTVR-FM (HD2)

History
- First air date: May 1957
- Former call signs: WRFK (1957–1961); WRFK-FM (1961–1988); WVMX (1988–1989); WVGO (1989–1996); WBZU (1996–1998); WRCL (1998–2001)
- Call sign meaning: "Beat Jamz"

Technical information
- Licensing authority: FCC
- Facility ID: 74168
- Class: B
- ERP: 14,500 watts
- HAAT: 280 meters (920 ft)
- Transmitter coordinates: 37°30′45″N 77°36′5.7″W

Links
- Public license information: Public file; LMS
- Webcast: Listen live (via Audacy)
- Website: www.audacy.com/1065thebeat

WBTJ (106.5 FM, "106.5 The Beat") is a commercial radio station licensed to Richmond, Virginia, United States. Owned by Audacy, Inc., the station serves the Greater Richmond Region and the Petersburg area with an urban contemporary format. WBTJ's studios are located just north of Richmond proper in unincorporated Henrico County, and the transmitter is sited in the Richmond suburb of Bon Air. Besides a standard analog transmission, WBTJ broadcasts using HD Radio technology, and is available online via Audacy.

== History ==
=== WRFK-FM ===
In December 1956, the Union Theological Seminary in Virginia (UTS) applied for a new noncommercial station; five months later, WRFK-FM 91.1 signed on, presenting classical music programming as well as religious and educational programs during its four-hour broadcast day. The call letters were the initials of the force behind the seminary's efforts to start a radio station, Robert Fitzgerald Kirkpatrick. He ran the UTS audiovisual center, operating a tape duplication service and sending tapes recorded at the seminary all over the country.

Two years later, WRNL donated a tower to the station, and the seminary applied and was approved to carry out a move of WRFK-FM to 102.9 MHz at a much higher effective radiated power of 16,000 watts, and to convert the station from a noncommercial to a commercial license. The 102.9 frequency had first been used in Richmond by WLEE-FM, a simulcast of WLEE (1480 AM), which operated from 1948 to 1957. In 1962, the station relocated to 106.5 MHz.

In 1969, EZ Communications, the new owners of WFMV, Richmond's commercial classical music station, decided to switch to a more profitable format. Amid protests from WFMV's listener base, EZ Communications ultimately agreed to donate WFMV's library to WRFK. This enabled WRFK to significantly increase its operating hours and upgrade its schedule. Later in 1971, WRFK became Richmond's NPR member station.

The seminary discovered in the mid-1980s that their charter did not allow them to operate a radio station and decided to sell it. A deal was made with the local Federated Arts Council to buy the station and preserve the format, but a larger offer for the increasingly valuable commercial frequency came from a commercial radio operator shortly thereafter and the seminary decided to go with the larger offer. This caused controversy which resulted in several stories appearing in the local papers about the possible loss of the fine arts/NPR format. Though the efforts of the public support groups and some interested businessmen and congressmen who wanted the format preserved, Commonwealth Public Broadcasting Corporation, owners of local public TV stations WCVE-TV and WCVW, won a noncommercial license, WCVE-FM, originally at 101.1.

On May 6, 1988, WRFK signed off and WCVE-FM temporarily signed on at 101.1, bringing most of the old WRFK staff, music library and most of their programming to the station.

=== WVMX ===
The protracted sale, delayed by protests, led to a second buyer: in the final deal, Pegasus Broadcasting bought WRFK-FM from the seminary and immediately flipped it to Daytona Group, which paid $6.5 million. Daytona moved the station's transmitter from a 300-foot (91 m) tower to a much taller 1,200-foot (370 m) tower near Powhatan County that had once been used by defunct TV station WVRN-TV. On July 28, 1988, 106.5 signed back on as a standard commercial station under the call letters WVMX, "Mix 106.5", with a Rock 40 format. By 1989, seeing competition from WRVQ, WMXB, and WRXL the station flipped formats to heavy metal and became "MX106.5". This lasted a month, and on July 19, the station flipped to oldies as WVGO.

=== WVGO ===
In 1991, Daytona sold the station to Benchmark Communications, with local partners John Crowley and Guy Spiller. On August 1, WVGO flipped to an adult album alternative format, staffed mostly by former employees of crosstown heritage rocker WRXL, which was looked upon by the former staffers as too commercial and restrictive. During its short life, the WVGO staff included Nick Perry, Jim Hatcher, Tara Hunter, Dal Hunter, Steve Forrest, Paul Shugrue, Dave Weaver, Mike Hsu, Meg Brulatour, Blake Smith, Kevin Matthews, Mad Dog and others. At first, the format was a freeform-type format more akin to a college station with jocks being allowed freedom on the air and to bring in their own records, and aired many specialty programs.

In August 1995, a new competitor arrived when WBZU (104.7 FM; also known as "The Buzz") signed on. In response, Benchmark brought in a new Program Director who dumped all specialty programming, and the format unofficially evolved into a more alternative format.

=== Howard Stern ===
Another move was to bring in the syndicated Howard Stern morning show in October 1995. The Stern show did not garner the expected high ratings, only reaching 10th place overall. The Stern show also generated local controversy (primarily from local grocer Ukrop's), causing WVGO to lose advertising. A complaint to the FCC about a Stern bit eventually brought Benchmark an FCC fine. In the spring of 1996, Benchmark sold WVGO and sister classic rock WLEE-FM to the owners of WBZU. ABS Communications, owned by local music and radio entrepreneur Kenny Brown, dropped Stern due to poor ratings, and on July 24, 1996, shut down WVGO and moved WBZU to 106.5 (and moved the WVGO calls to the now vacated 104.7 frequency and flipped it to oldies).

=== WRCL ===
In 1998, ABS was merged with SFX Broadcasting. On September 2, 1998, new management decided to dump the alternative format, citing low revenues. They stunted with 24 hours of construction sound effects and later stunted with soft rock music and TV theme songs. Two days later, they switched to oldies as Cool 106.5, and changed its call letters to WRCL the following month. WRCL's owners SFX went through a series of mergers, first as Capstar, then AMFM. In the fall of 2000, AMFM merged with Clear Channel, which would be renamed iHeartMedia in 2014.

=== WBTJ ===
On June 11, 2001, at 5 p.m., the station flipped to urban as "106.5 the Beat" and changed call letters to WBTJ. (This was the second time that the "Beat" moniker had been used in the market, the first being WBBT-FM from 1999 to 2000.)

On November 1, 2017, iHeartMedia announced that WBTJ, along with all of their sister stations in Richmond and Chattanooga, would be sold to Entercom due to that company's merger with CBS Radio. The sale was completed on December 19, 2017.

== HD Radio ==
WBTJ use to broadcast one HD subchannel:

- WBTJ-HD2 broadcast continuous smooth jazz music, with no commercials or DJs.

== Translator ==
WBTJ-HD2 was relayed by an FM translator, W241AP, to widen its broadcast area. The translator was repurposed as a relay of WRVQ-FM/HD2 as "96.1 the Planet" in 2013.
