= WECU =

- Winterville, North Carolina; United States
- Broadcast area: Greenville-Winterville
- Frequency: 1570 kHz
- Branding: ESPN 1570 Greenville

Programming
- Format: Sports
- Affiliations: ESPN Radio; Carolina Hurricanes; Charlotte Hornets; Washington Nationals Radio Network; Motor Racing Network; Performance Racing Network

Ownership
- Owner: CTC Media Group
- Sister stations: WWNB

History
- First air date: 2006

Technical information
- Licensing authority: FCC
- Facility ID: 135909
- Class: B
- Power: 8,000 watts day 200 watts night
- Transmitter coordinates: 35°32′15″N 77°25′06″W
- Translator: 107.5 W298BX (Winterville)

Links
- Public license information: Public file; LMS
- Webcast: Listen Live
- Website: ESPN Radio Greenville website

WECU (1570 AM) is a radio station broadcasting a sports format. Licensed to Winterville, North Carolina, United States, it serves the Greenville area. The station is currently owned by CTC Media Group and operated by New Lite Media.

== History ==
WECU shortly went off the air in November 2012. Later in same month, a new gospel station "The Promise" 1570 and 97.9 FM was heard over the air. On February 4, 2013 the Yolanda Adams morning was launched on the station airing weekdays from 6 am until 10 am. The station is being managed by Bronson Williams, the creator of Promise 107.3 which aired on WBOB-FM (now WVRA) from July 2007 until January 2012. On October 1, 2014 WECU changed their format to sports, with programming from ESPN Radio.

Logo before translator sign on
