= Millard the Mallard =

Fictional character

Millard The Mallard

Millard the Mallard was a fictional mallard duck who was used as a character and mascot of WRVA radio in Richmond, Virginia. It was featured on Alden Aaroe's morning show for 30 years.

== History ==
Millard the Mallard first appeared in September 1972 as a joke when John Harding, of the WRVA news staff, started making a Donald Duck-type voice during Alden Aaroe's morning show. Millard remained a daily feature for the next 28 years. In 2000, in an effort to re-invent WRVA as a serious straight news talk station, then-Program Director Randall Bloomquist had the "Millard The Mallard" features eliminated from the Morning Show, hosted by Tim Timberlake at the time. The elimination of Millard caused some disappointment among fans of the "old" WRVA.

John Harding reports that "Right now, Millard is soaking in retirement in a swamp here on our farm ... swizzles cold deliciouses and listens to deep tracks on old Miles Davis Albums. Oh yeah, and by the way, He's still upset that he got passed over for the AFLAC duck bits. Its tough being green."
