= WRXL =

- Richmond, Virginia; United States
- Broadcast area: Central Virginia
- Frequency: 102.1 MHz (HD Radio)
- Branding: Alt 102-1

Programming
- Language: English
- Format: Alternative rock
- Subchannels: HD2: Big 98.5 (country music)
- Affiliations: Elliot in the Morning; Premiere Networks

Ownership
- Owner: Audacy, Inc.; (Audacy License, LLC)
- Sister stations: WBTJ; WRNL; WRVA; WRVQ; WTVR-FM (HD2)

History
- First air date: March 4, 1949
- Former call signs: WRNL-FM (1949–73)
- Call sign meaning: "Richmond's Radio Excellence"

Technical information
- Licensing authority: FCC
- Facility ID: 11961
- Class: B
- ERP: 20,000 watts
- HAAT: 241 meters (791 ft)
- Transmitter coordinates: 37°36′52.5″N 77°30′54.9″W
- Translator: HD2: 98.5 W253BI (Richmond)

Links
- Public license information: Public file; LMS
- Webcast: Listen live (via Audacy)
- Website: www.audacy.com/alt1021rva

WRXL (102.1 FM "Alt 102-1") is a commercial radio station licensed to Richmond, Virginia, and serving Central Virginia. WRXL is owned and operated by Audacy, Inc. WRXL airs an alternative rock radio format.

Studios, offices and the transmitter tower are on Basie Road in Richmond. The station carries the syndicated Elliot in the Morning show, produced by Premiere Networks and originating at former sister station WWDC-FM in Washington, D.C.

== History ==
=== Early years as WRNL-FM ===
On March 4, 1949, the station signed on the air as WRNL-FM. It was the FM sister station to WRNL, owned by the Richmond Radio Corporation, a subsidiary of The Richmond News Leader newspaper (hence the WRNL-FM call sign). At first, WRNL-FM simulcast its AM counterpart, carrying the ABC Radio schedule of dramas, comedies, sports and news. In the late 1950s, WRNL-AM-FM moved to a full service format of middle of the road music, news, sports and talk.

In the 1960s, several Richmond FM stations received permission from the Federal Communications Commission for unusually high power. Today, Richmond is in Zone 1, limited to a maximum of 50,000 watts effective radiated power (ERP). Before these rules were put into place, WRNL-FM was permitted to go to 120,000 watts, WFMV (now WURV) went to 74,000 watts and, to this day, WRVQ (then WRVA-FM) runs at 200,000 watts.

=== Switch to rock as WRXL ===
In 1971, WRNL-AM-FM were bought by Rust Communications, which owned a number of radio stations around the country. Rust decided to give WRNL-FM its own format. It hired a staff of young DJs, stopped simulcasting the AM station and switched to progressive rock. To give the station a fresh identity, in 1973, the call sign was changed to WRXL. By 1980, the station's music had moved to an album-oriented rock and classic rock direction, based on playing the biggest selling rock artists. In 1993, WRVH (the new name of WRNL) and WRXL were sold to Clear Channel Communications, a forerunner of iHeartMedia, Inc., for $9.75 million. During the entire 1990's, WRXL evolved into a full-blown Mainstream rock station all the way through until 2002 when the station decided to transition into active rock to compete against, Cox Media's then-alternative rock station, Y-101. Their music program adjustment was successfully changed to an alternative metal lean around the mid- 2000's making it very similar to Y-101 without overlapping both station's format adjustment.

=== From Active Rock to Alternative Rock ===
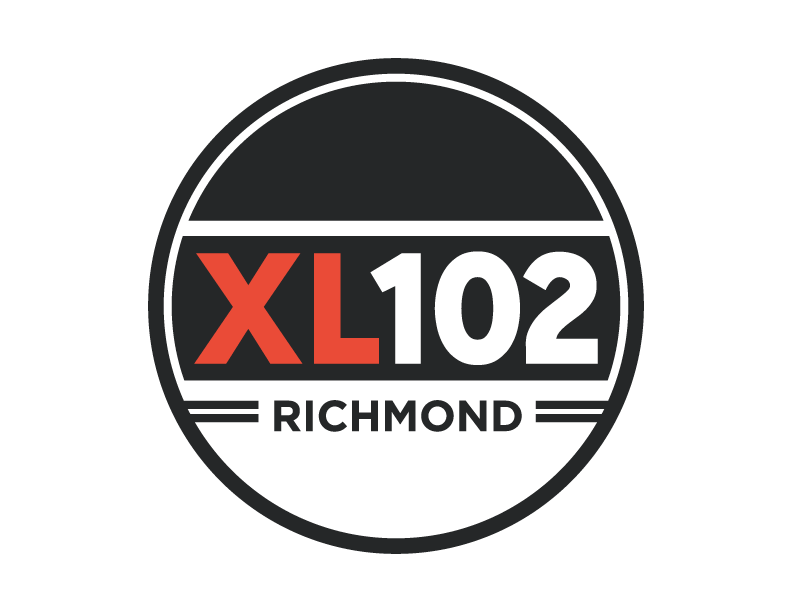
Former logo as "XL102"

In 2002, the station slowly started to move their format from being an album rock-leaning mainstream rock station to effectively begin an experimental approach to alternative metal to their format as Active Rock, the station rebranded as "102-1 The X" alongside the new name, the station updated their music programing intentionally to compete against Cox Media's Alternative rock rival, WDYL, well known as "Y-101". During that time, their format transition was proven to be a surprisingly successful and competitive approach during the mid and late 2000's, WRXL became a popular active rock station during that time and era until 2012 when the format started to decline in popularity. The transition to alternative rock overthrown their active rock sound completely during 2013, the station began to slowly phase out the active rock playlist format all the way through to fill the void of where WDYL, known as Y-101 once was three years after the station underwent their official change in their format to being Top 40/CHR as WHTI-FM introduced as "HOT 100.9" on April 29, 2010. The switch was similar to how WXMM, locally known as "100.5 MAX-FM" did. They changed their format and introduced the station as WVHT "HOT 100.5" in Hampton Roads during the spring of 2009. They changed their format from being Mainstream Rock to Top 40/CHR. HOT 100.9's music format was in direct competition against WRVQ Known as Q94. On October 1, 2012, WRXL rebranded from "102-1 The X" back to "XL 102", WRXL's branding from 1976 to 2002. In 2006 the station changed to a new broadcast tower at 791 feet (241 meters) in height above average terrain, while also dropping to 20,000 watts from its previous 120,000 watts. WRXL would still have a larger coverage area than conventional Class B FM stations, but with lower power due to the increased antenna height.

On November 1, 2017, iHeartMedia announced that WRXL, along with all of its co-owned stations in Richmond and Chattanooga, would be swapped to Entercom, coupled with that company's merger with CBS Radio. The sale was completed on December 19, 2017. The deal had iHeartMedia taking over several former CBS and Entercom stations in Boston and Seattle in exchange for the Richmond and Chattanooga stations.

On September 13, 2020, WRXL quietly re-branded as "Alt 102-1" as part of a systemic "revamping" of Entercom's alternative rock stations. At this time, most of the local DJs and programming staff were laid off and replaced with out-of-market hosts.

== HD Radio ==
WRXL also broadcasts an HD subchannel:

- WRXL-HD2 carries a country music format branded as "Big 98.5", which feeds the co-owned translator station W253BI at 98.5 FM. The station premiered July 27, 2015.
