= W241AP =

Translator of WTVR-FM HD2
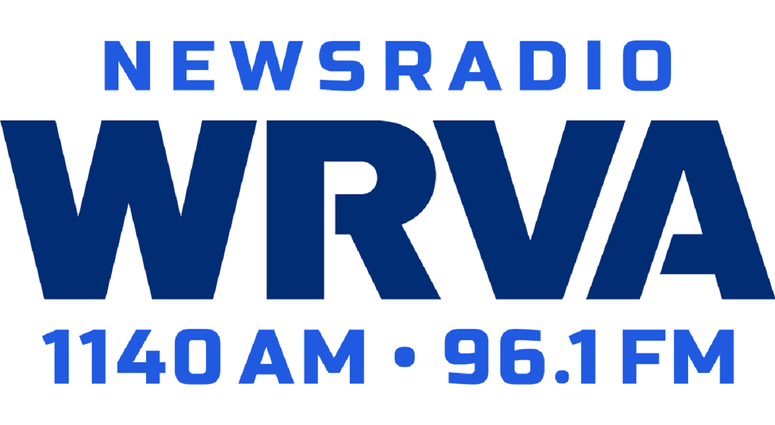

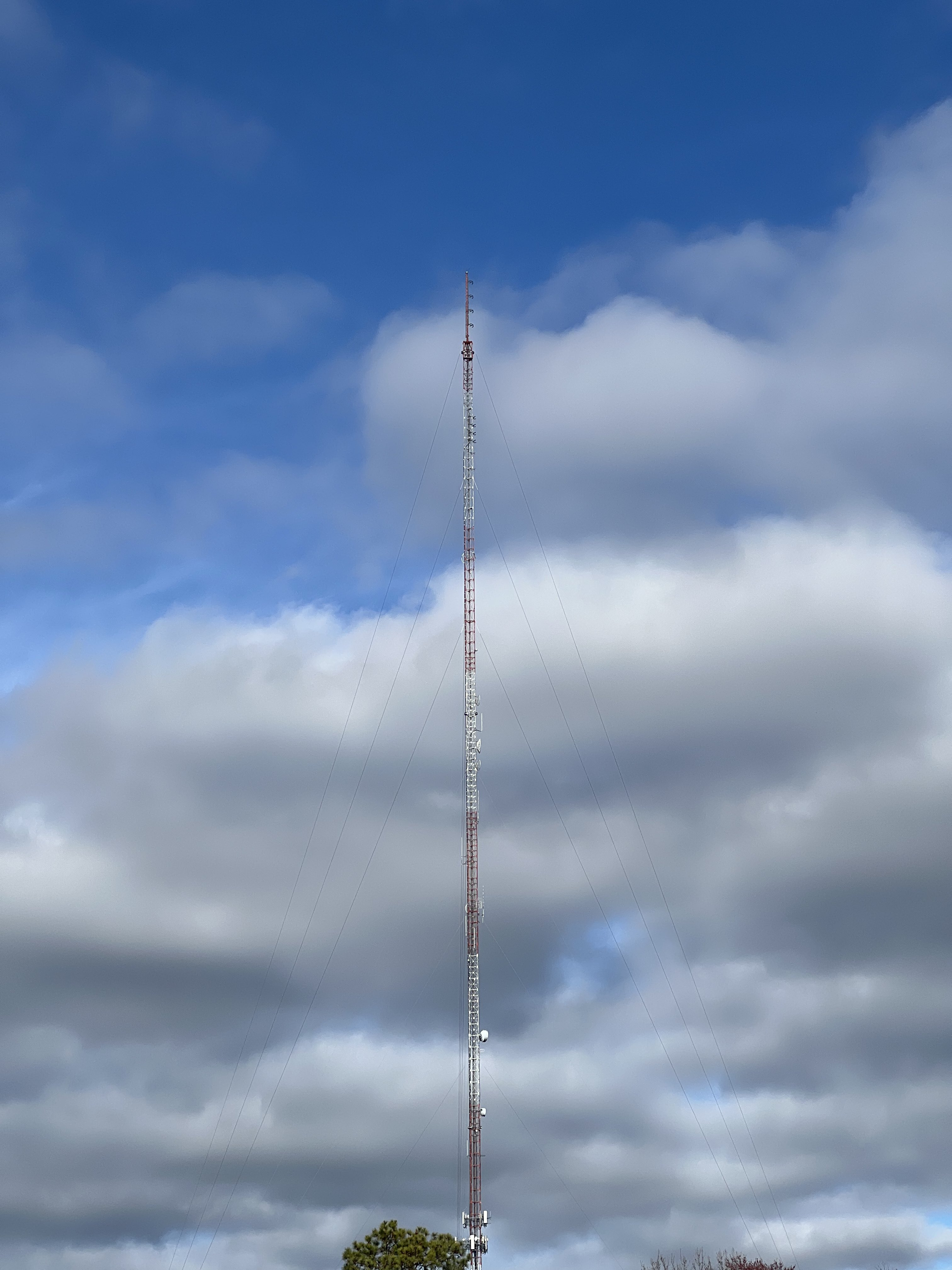
- W241AP tower in Chesterfield County, Virginia.

Midlothian, Virginia; United States
- Broadcast area: Central Virginia
- Frequency: 96.1 MHz
- Branding: News Radio 1140 and 96.1 WRVA

Programming
- Format: News/talk
- Affiliations: ABC News Radio; Fox News Radio; Premiere Networks; Radio America; Westwood One; Virginia Cavaliers

Ownership
- Owner: Audacy, Inc.; (Audacy License, LLC)
- Sister stations: WBTJ; WRNL; WRVA; WRVQ; WRXL (HD2); WTVR-FM

History
- First air date: 2004
- Former call signs: W295BF
- Call sign meaning: Translator allocation on FCC channel 241.

Technical information
- Licensing authority: FCC
- Facility ID: 139538
- Class: D
- Power: 145 watts
- HAAT: 255.2 meters (837 ft)
- Transmitter coordinates: 37°30′31.5″N 77°34′37.0″W

Links
- Public license information: Public file; LMS
- Webcast: Listen live (via Audacy)
- Website: www.audacy.com/newsradiowrva

W241AP is a news/talk formatted broadcast translator licensed to Midlothian, Virginia, serving Central Virginia. W241AP is owned and operated by Audacy, Inc.

== History ==
The station signed on as a translator for Liberty University's WRVL in 2004, on 96.1 MHz, using the callsign W241AP. In 2007, the station moved to Richmond and was reallocated to 106.1 MHz with 10 watts power, taking the callsign W295BF.

In April 2013, Liberty sold the station to Clear Channel Communications, which relocated the station to Midlothian and moved it back to 96.1 MHz with 145 watts power.

On April 15, 2013, Clear Channel debuted a satellite-fed classic rock format on the station. The branding, 96.1 The Planet, was designed to echo Cox Radio's long-time classic rock station, WKLR, which broadcasts a full-power signal at 96.5 MHz. WKLR had moved to a more current rock format as Rock 96.5 by the time Clear Channel brought 96.1 The Planet online.

As a translator is not legally permitted to originate its own programming, by U.S. Federal Communications Commission regulation, W241AP relays WRVQ-HD2.

The station resumed its original W241AP callsign on April 26, 2013.

On November 1, 2017, iHeartMedia announced that W241AP, along with all of their sister stations in Richmond and Chattanooga, would be sold to Entercom due to that company's merger with CBS Radio. The sale was completed on December 19, 2017.

On January 1, 2018, W241AP changed their format from classic rock to a simulcast of news/talk-formatted WRVA (1140 AM).
