= WFAX =

Regional Mexican/Spanish rhythmic radio station in Falls Church, Virginia

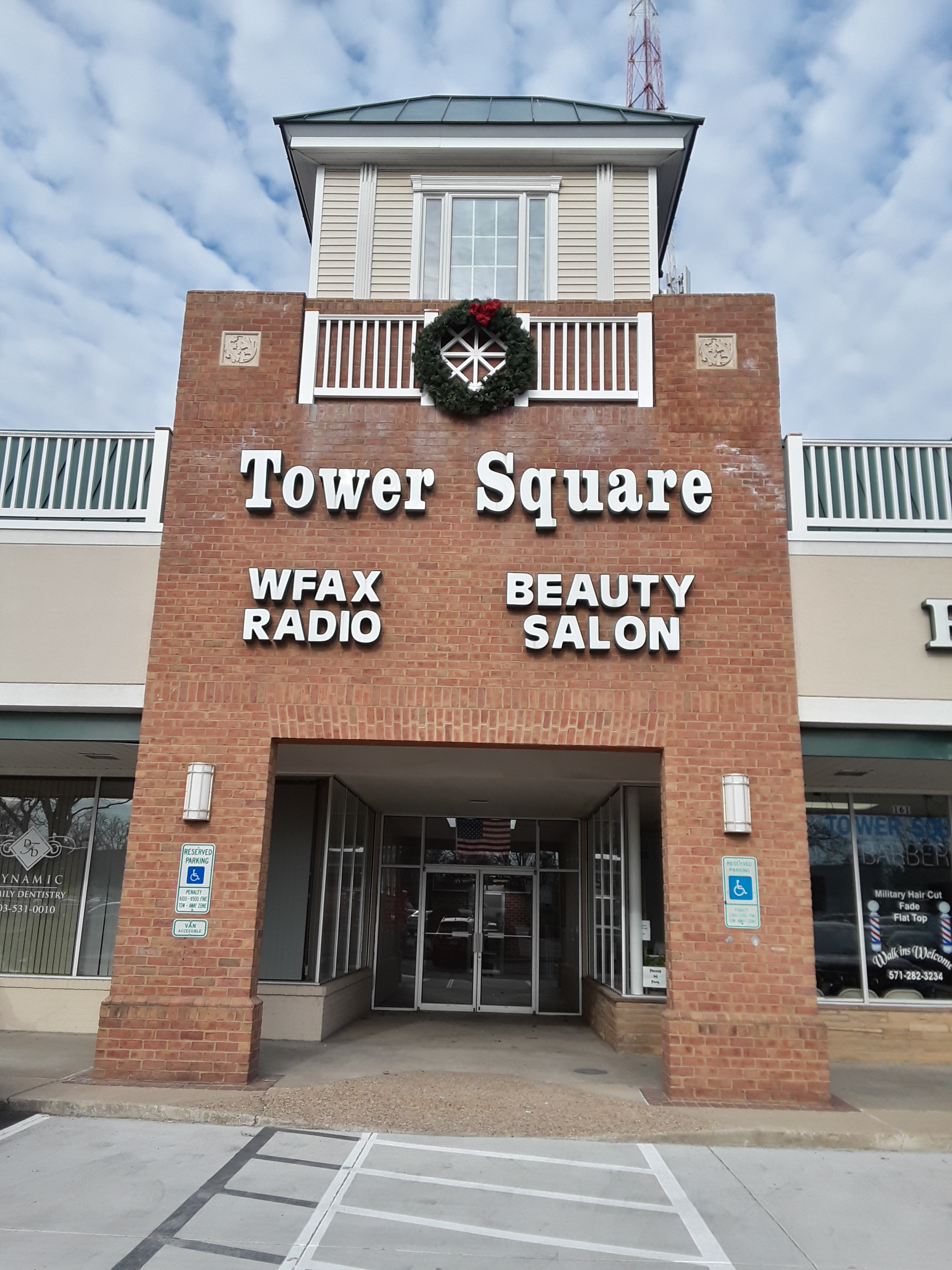
- Entrance to Tower Square, home of the offices of WFAX.
- Falls Church, Virginia; United States
- Broadcast area: Metro Washington, D.C.
- Frequency: 1220 kHz
- Branding: La Pantera 105.5, 100.7 Y 1220 AM

Programming
- Language: Spanish
- Format: Regional Mexican; reggaeton
- Affiliations: Washington Nationals Spanish Radio Network

Ownership
- Owner: Costa Media; (Costa Media Boston LLC)

History
- First air date: September 15, 1948

Technical information
- Licensing authority: FCC
- Facility ID: 48732
- Class: D
- Power: 5,000 watts (day); 48 watts (night)
- Transmitter coordinates: 38°52′47″N 77°10′18″W
- Translators: 100.7 W264DB (Falls Church); 105.5 W288BS (Reston)
- Repeater: 107.7 WWWT-HD5 (Manassas)

Links
- Public license information: Public file; LMS
- Webcast: Listen live
- Website: www.lapanteradc.com

WFAX (1220 kHz, "La Pantera 105.5, 100.7 Y 1220 AM") is an regional Mexican and reggaeton formatted broadcast American AM radio station licensed to Falls Church, Virginia, serving Metro Washington, D.C. WFAX is owned and operated by Jose Villafañe's Costa Media, through licensee Costa Media Boston LLC.

On June 8, 2022, following its purchase from Newcomb Broadcasting Corporation, WFAX had announced that it would change its format from Christian talk and teaching to regional Mexican/Hispanic rhythmic branded as "La Pantera" on July 1.

WFAX and co-owned WDCN-LD (87.7 FM) broadcast all Washington Nationals games in Spanish for the 2024 season. Prior to the 2025 season, the agreement was extended for an additional three years.

== Translator ==
WFAX has two FM translators; W264DB is co-located with WFAX and its signal is almost entirely directed to the southwest to protect WLVX on the same frequency. W288BS transmits from WTTG's tower in Bethesda, Maryland, to cover Washington proper.

Call sign	Frequency	City of license	FID	ERP (W)	Class	FCC info
W264DB	100.7 FM	Falls Church, Virginia	158365	100	D	LMS
W288BS	105.5 FM	Reston, Virginia	140589	99	D	LMS
