= WWNB =

- New Bern, North Carolina; United States
- Frequency: 1490 kHz
- Branding: ESPN New Bern

Programming
- Format: Sports
- Affiliations: ESPN Radio; Carolina Hurricanes; Charlotte Hornets; Washington Nationals Radio Network; Motor Racing Network; Performance Racing Network

Ownership
- Owner: CTC Media Group
- Sister stations: WAVQ, WNOS, WECU

History
- First air date: February 1954
- Former call signs: WOOW (1952–1957); WRNB (1957–1986); WLOJ (1986–1998)
- Call sign meaning: New Bern

Technical information
- Licensing authority: FCC
- Facility ID: 14672
- Class: C
- Power: 1,000 watts unlimited
- Transmitter coordinates: 35°7′59″N 77°3′56″W
- Translator: 107.5 W298DG (Bridgeton)

Links
- Public license information: Public file; LMS
- Webcast: Listen Live
- Website: 252espn.com

WWNB (1490 AM) is a radio station broadcasting a sports format and affiliated to ESPN Radio. Licensed to New Bern, North Carolina, United States. The station is currently owned by CTC Media Group. WWNB used to simulcast on WAVQ/1400 in Jacksonville, North Carolina. That simulcast ended in December 2012 after WAVQ was sold.

WWNB is the southernmost affiliate of the Washington Nationals Radio Network.
