= Elliot in the Morning =

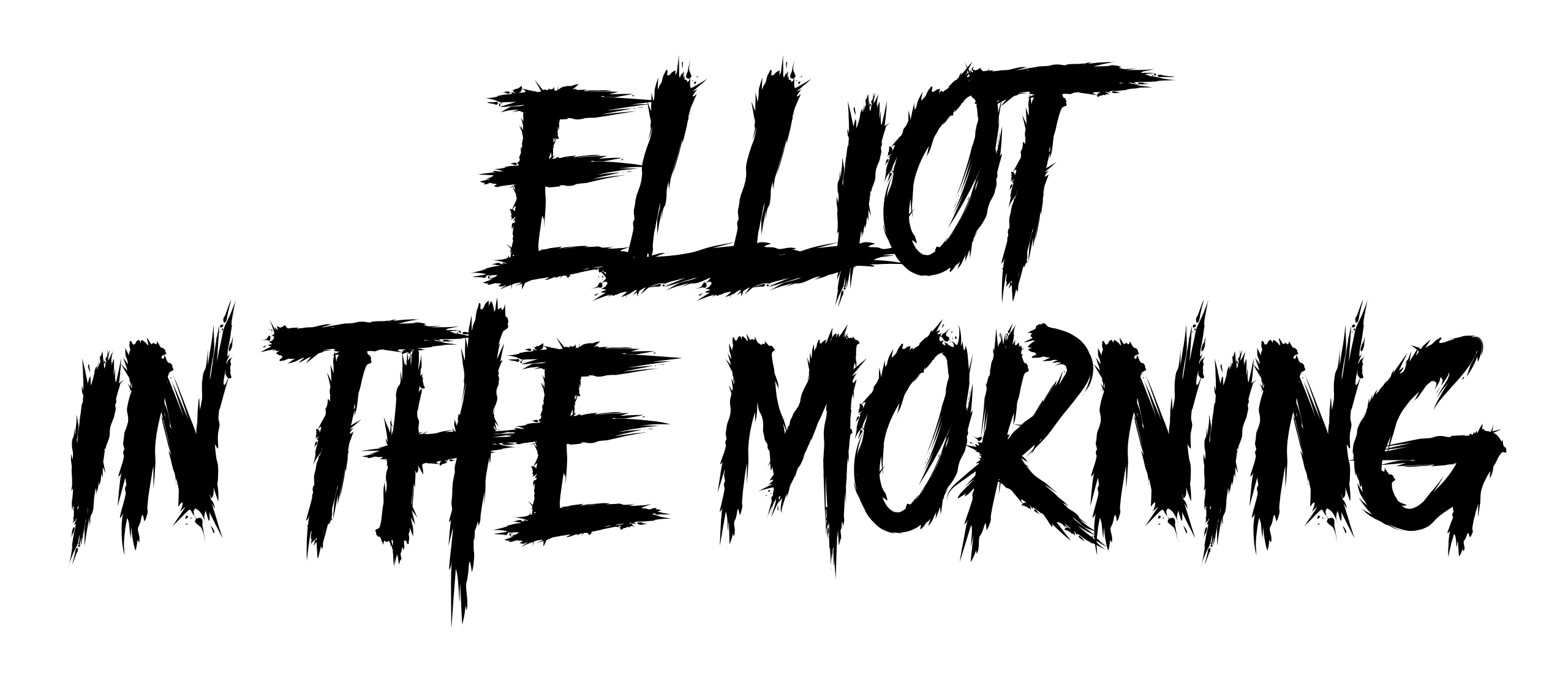
- Running time: 4 hours, 32 minutes
- Country of origin: United States
- Home station: WWDC (Washington, D.C.)
- Syndicates: WRXL (Richmond)
- Hosted by: Elliot Segal; Diane Stupar-Hughes; Tyler Molnar; Krysten Warnes
- Produced by: Tyler Molnar
- Original release: 1999
- Opening theme: "One Mint Julep" by Ray Charles
- Ending theme: "So Long, Farewell" by The Vandals
- Website: https://dc101.iheart.com/featured/elliot-in-the-morning/

Elliot in the Morning is a syndicated morning radio talk show hosted by DJ Elliot Segal and airing weekdays from "5:48 until 10 something." It is based at WWDC-FM Washington, D.C., and is heard on affiliate WRXL in Richmond. The format covers a broad spectrum of topics, ranging from in-person or telephone interviews with well-known celebrities, to gross-out stunts involving much of the show's supporting cast. The show has regular telephone interviews with Patricia Murphy (from The Daily Beast), Mark Steines (formerly from Entertainment Tonight) during sweeps and Brandon Noble (former NFL player) during football season.

As of 2005, Elliot in the Morning had been the cause of the fifth largest amount of Federal Communications Commission (FCC) fines since 1970, with $302,500 worth of fines leveled at the show. As a result, while the show still frequently involves euphemistic mentions of sexual topics, it is broadcast with a short tape delay, and is occasionally "dumped" to canned music for profanity.

The program was carried on WOSC in Ocean City, Maryland, from 2003 to 2004; on WCHH in Baltimore, Maryland, from May 2008 to November 2009; and on WBWZ in the Hudson Valley of New York until 2017. Beginning in January 2014, the show was briefly heard on AM talk radio station WOR in New York after that station's purchase by iHeartMedia, along with the DC and Richmond FM stations. The show made plans to leave the DC101 studios and relocate to New York. However, after citing that "significant changes" would be needed for the show to succeed in NYC, it was announced that the show would no longer be carried on WOR; in reality, the show and its audience flow proved to be an ill fit for the older-skewing AM station.

On December 22, 2021, it was announced that the show would be carried by KRBZ in Kansas City. On April 6, 2022, it was announced that the show would once again be heard in New York City, this time on alternative rock station WNYL 92.3 FM. While the originating station, DC101, is owned by iHeartMedia, the New York, Kansas City and Richmond affiliates are owned by Audacy, Inc. The Atlanta affiliate is owned by Cumulus Media. On October 27, 2022, WNYL started simulcasting all-news 1010 WINS and stopped carrying the show. On December 1, WNNX in Atlanta dropped the show after eight months. In January 2023, KRBZ dropped the show after one year.

== Controversies ==
=== White House stunt ===
On the morning of February 8, 2001, Elliot Segal sent Bryan "Flounder" Schlossberg to the south fence of the White House, where a gunman had been shot and arrested the previous day, offering passersby to a "free shot of bush." The "bush" in question was an anatomical reference in connection to a spread of porn magazines that were on display. Flounder was connected to the airwaves via cell phone when the Secret Service surrounded him and demanded that he hang up the phone. In the end, Flounder avoided being taken into custody, but was however banned from the grounds of the White House indefinitely.

=== Bishop O'Connell High School ===
The morning of May 7, 2002, two sixteen-year-old O'Connell students called the show to be considered in a contest whose winners were to be cage dancers at an upcoming Kid Rock concert at George Mason University's Patriot Center. Instead, goaded by Elliot, they discussed alleged sexual activity at O'Connell. The students claimed to be eighteen. The two discussed giving oral sex to lines of boys in the hallway and having intercourse in stairwells and closets. They implied these acts occurred during a typical school day. The students, who had used false names on air, were suspended the same day for their comments. The principal addressed the student body on the PA system and discussed the immorality of Mr. Segal's radio show. The following day (May 8), Mr. Segal, angered by the students' suspension, personally insulted the principal on air, making lewd remarks about his family and his sexual activity. He also mocked the school's mission statement, specifically what he considered to be a hypocritical statement that their educational environment is "rooted in the life of Christ." The two days of broadcasting were ruled indecent by the Federal Communications Commission (FCC). As a result, in October 2003, sixteen months after the incident, DC101's parent company Clear Channel Communications was fined $55,000.
