= WTVR-FM =

- Richmond, Virginia; United States
- Broadcast area: Central Virginia
- Frequency: 98.1 MHz (HD Radio)
- Branding: Mix 98.1

Programming
- Language: English
- Format: Adult contemporary
- Subchannels: HD2: Talk radio (WRVA)
- Affiliations: Premiere Networks; WTVR-TV

Ownership
- Owner: Audacy, Inc.; (Audacy License, LLC)
- Sister stations: W241AP; WBTJ; WRNL; WRVA; WRVQ; WRXL (HD2)

History
- First air date: February 17, 1947
- Former call signs: WCOD (1947–1966)
- Former frequencies: 96.3 MHz (1947–1948)
- Call sign meaning: "Television Richmond" (previous co-ownership with WTVR-TV)

Technical information
- Licensing authority: FCC
- Facility ID: 54387
- Class: B
- Power: 50,000 watts
- HAAT: 256 meters (840 ft)
- Transmitter coordinates: 37°34′0.5″N 77°28′34.9″W
- Translator: HD2: 96.1 W241AP (Midlothian)

Links
- Public license information: Public file; LMS
- Webcast: Listen live (via Audacy)
- Website: audacy.com/mix981richmond

WTVR-FM (98.1 FM, "Mix 98.1") is a radio station licensed to Richmond, Virginia, United States. WTVR-FM serves Central Virginia with an adult contemporary music format. The station is owned and operated by Audacy, Inc. with studios and offices located north of Richmond's city limits on Basie Road in Dumbarton. It formerly shared a nearby broadcasting tower with its former TV sister station, WTVR-TV. (WTVR-TV no longer broadcasts from this tower.) Currently, it shares a tower with PBS member stations WCVE-TV and WCVW.

WTVR-FM is a grandfathered "superpower station". The station has an effective radiated power of 50,000 watts at 256 meters. This exceeds the maximum allowable ERP for the station's antenna height above average terrain according to current FCC rules, which is 17,500 watts at 256 meters.

== History ==
WTVR-FM began broadcasting in February 1947 as WCOD (standing for "Capital Old Dominion") and was owned by the Richmond Broadcasting Company. It was the sister station of WMBG (1380 AM). For many years, it was also co-owned with WTVR-TV. In 1966, the radio stations began sharing the television station's WTVR call sign, signifying "Television Richmond". WTVR-FM operates at 50,000 watts, standard for most FM stations in the Richmond market. However, at 256 meters (840 ft), its tower is taller than the FM Class B limit of 150 meters (490 ft).

For much of its early history, WTVR-FM aired beautiful music, although by the 1980s, that mostly instrumental format was falling out of favor with younger listeners.

At its original site with WTVR-TV Main Street studios at 3314 Cutshaw Avenue in downtown Richmond, Virginia, one could see its free standing broadcast tower for miles around. The television andradio stations shared a parking lot at that time with the radio studios across the parking lot, in the house on Cutshaw Avenue, situated behind the TV station.

During the Stereo Country FM98 era in the mid-1980s, WTVR-FM had a live personality line up, and simulcast the country music format with WTVR (1380 AM). In the mid-1980s it competed with small 3,000 watt class A facility WKHK nearby but they were always second banana to WTVR-FM having a 50,000 watt class B signal, and better personalities. At the helm was program director Mike Allen who did weekday morning drive, followed by Hillary Kane on middays, Dave Shannon in afternoon drive, and automated programming with recorded carted weather overnight. The facility was owned by Roy H. Park in this era. Eventually the station moved away from the country format, and transitioned to an adult contemporary format.

On November 13, 2015, WTVR-FM switched to Christmas music, and began calling itself "The All-New Christmas 98.1". In recent years, along with many other adult contemporary radio stations, WTVR-FM switches to all holiday music from mid-November to Christmas Day. As the holidays ended, iHeartMedia rebranded the station as "Mix 98.1" on December 28. Despite the new branding, the format remains adult contemporary, although more uptempo.

On November 1, 2017, iHeartMedia announced that WTVR-FM, along with all of their sister stations in Richmond and Chattanooga, would be sold to Entercom (now Audacy, Inc.) as part of that company's merger with CBS Radio. The sale was completed on December 19, 2017.

== WTVR-HD2 ==
WTVR-FM broadcasts a simulcast of news/talk-formatted WRVA on its HD2 sub channel. On May 5, 2014, translator W253BI (98.5 FM) began simulcasting WRVA via WTVR-HD2. The simulcast on W253BI ended on July 23, 2015; WRVA's signal is still relayed via WTVR-HD2.

Broadcast translator for WTVR-HD2
| Call sign | Frequency | City of license | FID | ERP (W) | HAAT | Class | Transmitter coordinates | FCC info |
|---|---|---|---|---|---|---|---|---|
| W241AP | 96.1 FM | Midlothian, Virginia | 139538 | 145 | 255.2 m (837 ft) | D | 37°30′31.5″N 77°34′37.0″W | LMS |
