= WAVQ (AM) =

- Jacksonville, North Carolina; United States
- Broadcast area: Jacksonville, North Carolina; Camp Lejeune, North Carolina
- Frequency: 1400 kHz
- Branding: Beach Boogie, and Blues

Programming
- Format: Beach music
- Affiliations: ABC News, Accuweather, Dial Global, The John Tesh Show

Ownership
- Owner: Donald W. Curtis; (Eastern Airwaves, LLC)
- Sister stations: WNCT

History
- First air date: 2008
- Former call signs: WJQQ (September–November 2008); WSTK (November 2008-February 6, 2009)

Technical information
- Licensing authority: FCC
- Facility ID: 161860
- Class: C
- Power: 1,000 watts (unlimited)
- Transmitter coordinates: 34°44′56.0″N 77°24′51.0″W
- Translator: 106.1 W291DO (Jacksonville)

Links
- Public license information: Public file; LMS

WAVQ (1400 AM) is a radio station licensed to serve Jacksonville, North Carolina, United States. The station is owned by and operated by Donald Curtis' Eastern Airwaves, LLC. WAVQ broadcasts a beach music format simulcasting WNCT (1070 AM) serving Jacksonville and Onslow County, North Carolina.

The station was assigned the WAVQ call sign by the Federal Communications Commission on February 6, 2009.

== History ==
WAVQ signed on in late 2008, under the callsign WSTK, offering an oldies format as “1400 The Wave”. The station was originally owned by Conner Media Corporation.

The callsign WAVQ was assigned on February 6, 2009.

On August 9, 2009 the format was changed to Sports-Talk as ESPN Radio 1400. Later, in July 2011, becoming a simulcast of ESPN affiliate WWNB 1490 AM in New Bern, North Carolina.

In November 2012, WAVQ was sold to CDV Broadcasting, LLC and the format was changed to classic hits as “1400 The Q”. In January 2013, an FM translator was added on 95.5 FM.

Effective October 30, 2020, CDV Broadcasting sold WAVQ and two translators to Donald Curtis' Eastern Airwaves, LLC for $270,000.
