= WRVQ =

Contemporary hit radio station in Richmond, Virginia

- Richmond, Virginia; United States
- Broadcast area: Greater Richmond Region
- Frequency: 94.5 MHz (HD Radio)
- Branding: Q94

Programming
- Language: English
- Format: Contemporary hit radio
- Subchannels: HD2: Sports radio (WRNL)
- Affiliations: Premiere Networks

Ownership
- Owner: Audacy, Inc.; (Audacy License, LLC)
- Sister stations: WBTJ; WRNL; WRVA; WRXL (HD2); WTVR-FM (HD2)

History
- First air date: August 10, 1948
- Former call signs: WRVB (1948–1956); WRVA-FM (1956–1972)
- Call sign meaning: Richmond, Virginia Q

Technical information
- Licensing authority: FCC
- Facility ID: 11963
- Class: B
- ERP: 200,000 watts
- HAAT: 107 meters (351 ft)
- Transmitter coordinates: 37°24′13.0″N 77°18′59.0″W

Links
- Public license information: Public file; LMS
- Webcast: Listen live (via Audacy); Listen live (via iHeartRadio)
- Website: www.audacy.com/q94

WRVQ (94.5 FM, "Q94") is a commercial radio station licensed to Richmond, Virginia, and serving Greater Richmond Region. Owned by Audacy, Inc., it airs a contemporary hit radio format, with studios and offices are located just north of Richmond city limits on Basie Road in unincorporated Henrico County, Virginia. WRVQ's transmitter is on WRVA Road in Henrico, co-located with the towers for WRVA.

WRVQ broadcasts in HD Radio; the HD2 digital subchannel carries the sports radio programming of WRNL.

== History ==
=== Early years as WRVB, WRVA-FM ===
On August 10, 1948, the station signed on as WRVB. It was the FM counterpart to WRVA. WRVA and WRVB were owned by a tobacco company, Larus & Brother, with studios in the Hotel Richmond. WRVB had an effective radiated power of 25,000 watts, mostly simulcasting WRVA, including the line-up of CBS Radio Network dramas, comedies, sports and news, during the "Golden Age of Radio".

In 1956, Larus & Brother signed on WRVA-TV (now WWBT). At the same time, the FM call sign was switched to WRVA-FM. When the TV station became an NBC network affiliate, WRVA-AM-FM switched to the NBC Radio Network as well.

=== Superpower authorization ===
In the 1960s, WRVA-FM was one of several Richmond FM stations receiving permission from the Federal Communications Commission for unusually high power. Today, Richmond is in Zone 1, limited to a maximum of 50,000 watts effective radiated power (ERP). Before these rules were strictly enforced, WFMV (now WURV) was permitted to operate at 74,000 watts, WRNL-FM (now WRXL) broadcast at 120,000 watts, and, to this day, 94.5 is grandfathered at 200,000 watts. Over time, those stations reduced their power but kept their coverage area by locating on taller towers. WRVQ has remained at 200,000 watts, but uses a relatively short tower of 107 meters (351 ft) in height above average terrain (HAAT).

In the 1960s, WRVA-FM began to broadcast its own programming, mostly easy listening music, with the AM station's news and other shows simulcast during some hours.

=== Top 40 WRVQ ===
In 1969, WRVA-AM-FM were sold to Southern Broadcasters. On June 30, 1972, Southern Broadcasters switched WRVA-FM to a new contemporary hit radio format as WRVQ. Until the 1970s, Top 40 stations were mostly on the AM band. In Richmond, the big contemporary stations were WTVR (now WBTK) and WLEE (now WTOX). Most home and car radios could only receive AM broadcasts at this time.

At midnight on June 30, 1972, the operations manager, Bill Garcia, was the first voice and the first song play was Celebrate by Rare Earth. WRVQ known as Super Q had Live DJ's from the start. In 1978, Southern Broadcasters became Harte-Hanks Radio. In 1984, WRVA and WRVQ were sold to Edens Broadcasting, and were in turn sold to Clear Channel Communications (now iHeartMedia) in 1992. Through all the sales, WRVQ has stayed in the same format, as the leading Top 40 station in the Richmond radio market.

=== Entercom ownership ===
On November 1, 2017, iHeartMedia announced that it would swap its stations in Richmond and Chattanooga to Entercom, in exchange for stations in Boston and Seattle being divested by Entercom to comply with FCC ownership caps during its merger with CBS Radio. In March 2021, Entercom changed its name to Audacy, Inc.

=== WRVQ HD-2 ===
WRVQ broadcasts in the HD Radio format. WRVQ-HD2 formerly carried "The Planet", an automated classic rock format. On January 1, 2018, WRVQ-HD2 and FM translator W241AP 96.1 MHz, were converted to an FM simulcast of WRVA, returning the station to the same programming as its original AM sister station for the first time in decades.

The HD2 subchannel later changed to a simulcast of co-owned sports radio station WRNL 910 AM. WRVA is now heard on the HD2 subchannel of co-owned 98.1 WTVR-FM, which in turn feeds the W241AP translator.
