= Bon Secours Memorial College of Nursing =

Private college in Richmond, Virginia, US

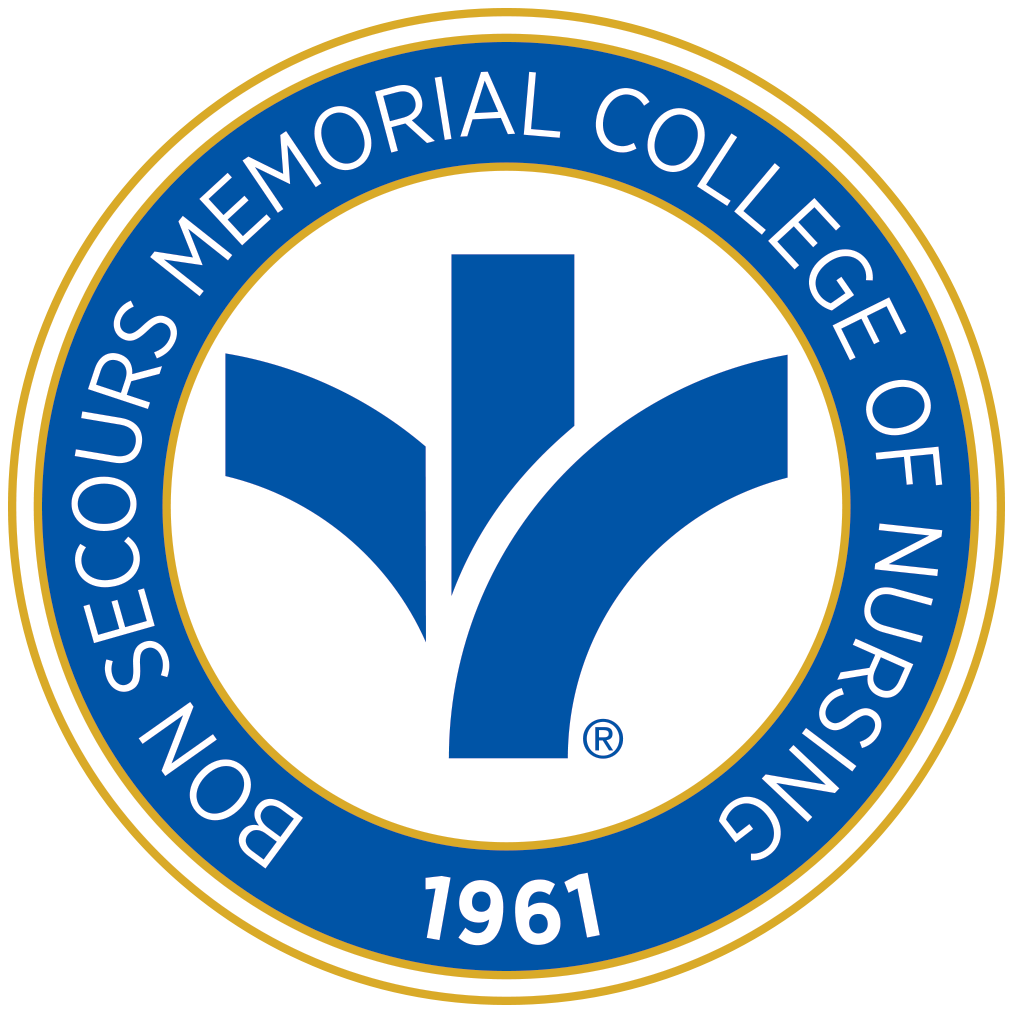
- Former names: Richmond Memorial School of Nursing (1961–1998); Bon Secours Memorial School of Nursing (1998–2010)
- Motto: Good Help to Those in Need
- Type: Private nursing school
- Established: 1961
- Academic affiliations: Bon Secours Mercy Health
- President: Donald John Emery
- Dean: Chris-Tenna Perkins
- Students: 500
- Location: Richmond, Virginia, U.S. 37°38′48″N 77°25′59″W
- Campus: Suburban
- Colors: Blue and white
- Website: www.bsmcon.edu
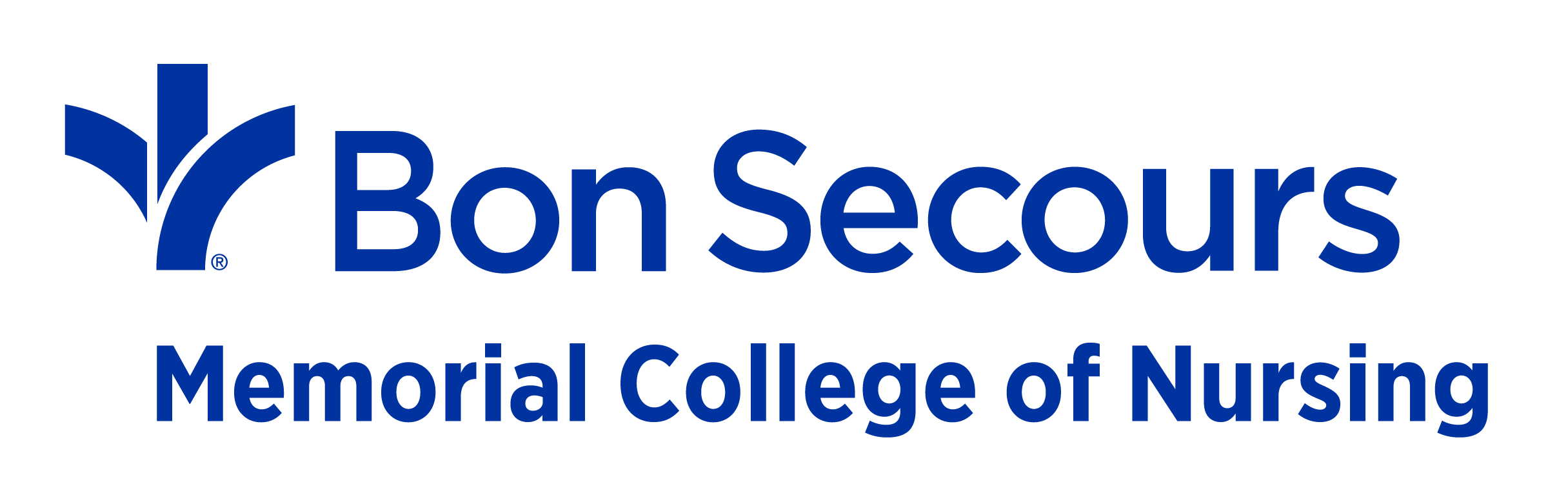

The Bon Secours Memorial College of Nursing (BSMCON) is a private nursing school in Richmond, Virginia. BSMCON is a department owned, operated, and controlled by Bon Secours Memorial Regional Medical Center, LLC. It is affiliated with the Catholic-based, nonprofit Bon Secours Mercy Health.

== History ==
BSMCON's history dates back to the formation of Richmond Memorial Hospital in 1957. Richmond Memorial Hospital School of Nursing opened in 1961 to serve as a source of nurses for the hospital. In 1993, a replacement hospital for Richmond Memorial was planned in collaboration with Bon Secours. The new hospital, Bon Secours Memorial Regional Medical Center, opened in 1998 and the school was renamed the Bon Secours Memorial School of Nursing.

In 2010, the school launched a four-year Bachelor of Science in nursing degree and became the Bon Secours Memorial College of Nursing.

== Academics and accreditation ==
BSMCON offers a pre-licensure Bachelor of Science in nursing program, a post-licensure online RN to BSN program, and a Direct Entry Master of Science in nursing (DE-MSN) program for college graduates or career professionals with a non-nursing bachelor's degree to fast-track their path to become a master's prepared registered nurse. Bon Secours Memorial College of Nursing is accredited by the Commission on Collegiate Nursing Education and holds institutional accreditation with the Accrediting Bureau of Health Education Schools. The college is approved to operate by the State Council of Higher Education in Virginia and the Virginia Board of Nursing. The BSN program includes the essential content recommended by the American Association of Colleges of Nursing.
