= WRVA (AM) =

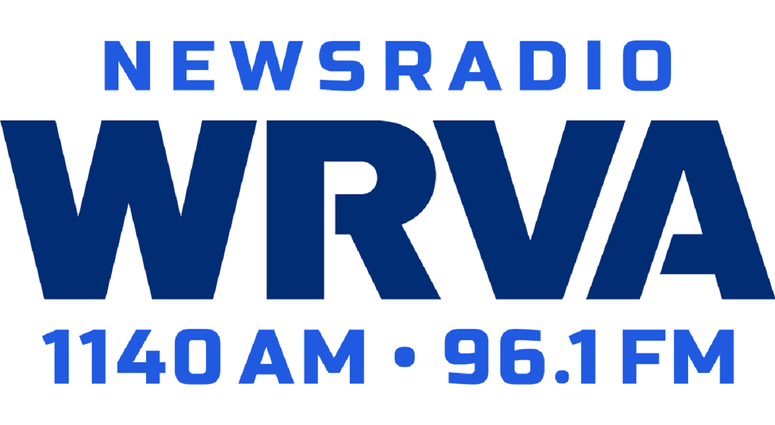
- Richmond, Virginia; United States
- Broadcast area: Greater Richmond Region
- Frequency: 1140 kHz
- Branding: NewsRadio 1140 WRVA and 96.1 FM

Programming
- Format: News/Talk
- Affiliations: ABC News Radio; Fox News Talk; Premiere Networks; Radio America; WestStar TalkRadio Network; Westwood One; WTVR-TV; Motor Racing Network; Performance Racing Network; Virginia Cavaliers; Washington Nationals

Ownership
- Owner: Audacy, Inc.; (Audacy License, LLC)
- Sister stations: WBTJ; WRNL; WRVQ; WRXL; WTVR-FM

History
- First air date: November 2, 1925
- Call sign meaning: Richmond, Virginia

Technical information
- Licensing authority: FCC
- Facility ID: 11914
- Class: A
- Power: 50,000 watts unlimited
- Transmitter coordinates: 37°24′16.3″N 77°18′53.2″W
- Translator: 96.1 W241AP (Midlothian relays WTVR-FM HD2)
- Repeater: 98.1 WTVR-FM HD2 (Richmond)

Links
- Public license information: Public file; LMS
- Webcast: Listen live (via Audacy)
- Website: www.audacy.com/newsradiowrva

WRVA (1140 kHz) is a commercial AM radio station licensed to Richmond, Virginia and serving Greater Richmond Region. WRVA airs a news/talk radio format and is owned by Audacy, Inc. Established in 1925, WRVA is one of Virginia's oldest radio stations, and the most powerful AM station in the Commonwealth. For much of its history, WRVA billed itself as the "Voice of Virginia."

WRVA is a Class A, clear channel station, transmitting with 50,000 watts, the maximum for commercial AM stations in the U.S. It uses a directional antenna with a two-tower array to protect the other Class A station on 1140 AM, XEMR in Monterrey, Mexico. Its transmitter is on WRVA Road near the James River in Henrico, Virginia. WRVA is also heard on 145 watt FM translator W241AP at 96.1 MHz in Midlothian, Virginia.

Weekdays begin with "Richmond's Morning News with Rich Herrera." Afternoon drive time is hosted by Jeff Katz. The rest of the weekday schedule comes from nationally syndicated shows including Brian Kilmeade, Dana Loesch, Sean Hannity, Jimmy Failla and Coast to Coast AM with George Noory. Weekends feature programs on health, money, home repair, gardening, law and technology. Syndicated weekend hosts include Kim Komando, Glenn Beck, Todd Starnes, Our American Stories with Lee Habeeb, Bill Handel on the Law, Rich DeMuro on Tech, Sunday Nights with Bill Cunningham and Somewhere in Time with Art Bell. Some weekend hours are paid brokered programming. Most hours begin with an update from ABC News Radio. WRVA is the Richmond-area home for University of Virginia Cavaliers football and men's basketball.

== History ==
=== Early years ===
Although three-letter call signs were still available when the station was started, "WRVA" was chosen since it stands for Richmond, Virginia. WRVA first signed on at 9 p.m. on November 2, 1925. Known initially as "Edgeworth Radio", it was owned by Larus and Brother Company, a tobacco company operating as the "House of Edgeworth." The radio station was originally put on the air as a public service two nights per week.

The early WRVA facilities were a small studio in a corner of a warehouse on Richmond's Tobacco Row using a tower mounted on the roof of the building. It soon became a vital and profitable business enterprise. By 1930, WRVA was on the air seven days a week, 24 hours daily, with its power increased to 50,000 watts in 1939. Initially it was an NBC Red Network affiliate, carrying its dramas, comedies, news, sports, soap operas, game shows and big band broadcasts during the "Golden Age of Radio." It later switched affiliation to CBS.

=== New facilities ===
In 1935, WRVA built a new transmitter in Mechanicsville, a small community located northeast of Richmond. The new tower for the antenna at this location was the first all-wood self-supporting radio tower in North America. Field tests conducted later indicated that the new tower produced "a 400% increase in dependable night-time service area and a three-fold increase in the daytime area."

However, it was only a short time before a much larger facility was to be placed on-line. WRVA's 1939-era transmitter building in Varina, east of Richmond, is listed as a National Historic Site. It is a two-story colonial style brick building which was a kit-building. It originally contained a 1929 Western Electric transmitter, which was a "walk-through" model. The broadcast signal was transmitted from two large steel twin towers.

In the late 1940s, WRVA's facilities extended beyond Richmond. An ad in a 1947 issue of the trade magazine "Broadcasting" proclaimed "Studios in Richmond and Norfolk, Virginia." (Richmond and Norfolk are nearly 100 miles apart.) The same ad noted that WRVA was "Virginia's only 50,000 watt radio station."

=== FM station ===
An FM outlet was established in Norfolk, on June 6, 1948, when WRVC began broadcasting on 102.5 MHz, "airing shows of CBS, duplicating parts of the WRVA schedule and originating some of its own programs." Because few people owned FM receivers in that era, the experiment was short-lived.

WRVA began an FM operation in Richmond in 1948. On August 12, WRVB (now WRVQ) began broadcasting on 94.5 MHz. WRVB simulcasted the AM station's programming "with a few exceptions."

In 1961, the "Western" transmitter, as it came to be known by the WRVA staff, was replaced with an RCA BTA-50H Ampliphase after serving for more than 30 years but was kept as a back-up transmitter. It was powered-up and used at least once a week to keep it in operational condition for another 20 years.

In the early 1980s, the Western Electric transmitter was removed and replaced with a 50,000 watt Continental. The Ampliphase was then made the back-up. In the 1990s, the Ampliphase was then replaced by a newer Harris transmitter and the Continental was made as the back-up. During the 1970s, WRVQ installed its transmitters in the building.

=== The Voice of Virginia: a "clear channel" station ===
By 1930, WRVA was broadcasting 24 hours a day. It boosted its power to 50,000 watts in 1939 to better reach rural areas. Its daytime signal provides at least secondary coverage to most of the eastern portion of Virginia, from Hampton Roads to Fredericksburg. Under the right conditions, it reaches as far west as the fringes of the Shenandoah Valley and as far south as northeastern North Carolina.

At night (when the AM signals travel farther), WRVA can be heard across most of the eastern half of North America with a good radio. This includes most of the United States east of the Mississippi River, as well as part of Canada.

=== Past personalities ===
From 1946 to 1957, the station carried The Old Dominion Barn Dance, a popular live country music program.

Two of WRVA's more popular personalities were fictional characters. In the 1950s and 1960s, when the studio was located across Capitol Square from the Virginia State Capitol in the Hotel Richmond, WRVA's Capitol Squirrel imparted wisdom and tossed an occasional snowball at lawmakers and local government using a voice created by speeding up the recording in manner later made famous by David Seville and his "Alvin and the Chipmunks" characters. In the 1970s, the Millard the Mallard character carried on dialogue with announcers during the morning rush hour traffic reports.

One of WRVA's better known real-life personalities was long-time host Alden Aaroe. His Christmas "WRVA Salvation Army Shoe Fund" provided thousands of shoes annually for needy children. Although Aaroe died in 1993, the program he headed has continued, having raised over $5.6 million in its history. Virginia Commonwealth University and Aaroe's family honor the memory of Alden Aaroe with a scholarship in his name for broadcast journalism students.

Because of AM radio signal reach, nighttime hosts enjoyed a listenership at considerable distances such as the former head of the Virginia Chapter of the NAACP, host Jack Gravely, whose evening show was heard hundreds of miles away well into neighboring states overnight. An overnight country music program headed by "Big John" Trimble targeted truckers in the 1970s, again taking advantage of the large nighttime coverage area of the clear channel station. Broadcasting from a remote studio located at Jarrell's Truck Stop in Doswell, Virginia, the show ran for eighteen years. It made Big John into a national radio personality.

=== Helicopter crash ===
In 1974, the WRVA traffic helicopter lost a tail rotor at a low altitude and crashed into a house on West 31st Street in South Richmond, killing WRVA reporter Howard Bloom, the pilot, and a small child eating dinner with his family.

=== Virginia News Network, Metro Traffic ===
The Virginia News Network (VNN) was founded in 1977 when Charlottesville Broadcasting Corporation began distributing newscasts to a handful of affiliates via telephone line from its flagship station, WINA in Charlottesville. VNN headquarters were relocated to WRVA's signature headquarters building in Richmond about 6 years later.

In the early 1990s, WRVA turned over its traffic reporting functions to Metro Traffic but in 2002 began doing its own reports again when the Clear Channel Richmond stations formed a "Total Traffic" division with local personality Scott Stevens in charge. Total Traffic did reports for WRVA, as well as other stations in the Clear Channel Communications Richmond Group.

=== Television ===
WRVA and WRVB acquired a television sister station in 1956, when WRVA-TV began broadcasting on channel 12. WRVA's parent company, Larus and Brother, sought a TV station after two other TV outlets had signed on the air in Richmond. It competed with a newspaper publishing company. Because the FCC was trying to avoid TV-newspaper cross ownership in the 50s, Larus and Brother were awarded the license. WRVA-TV (now WWBT) signed on the air on April 29.

After simulcasting with WRVA during its first two decades, management decided to give WRVA-FM its own programming. The call sign switched to WRVQ, becoming one of Richmond's first FM stations to switch to a Top 40 hit music format.

=== Ownership changes ===
In 1966, the death of Larus and Brother's longtime president, William Reed, prompted his heirs to break up Larus and Brother's various interests. However, they were very selective about potential buyers, and were only willing to enter talks with established broadcasters with a legacy of community service. In 1968, WRVA-TV was sold to Jefferson Standard Broadcasting (later Jefferson-Pilot), owner of WBT, WBT-FM, and WBTV in Charlotte, North Carolina. Reflecting the connection to WBT, WRVA-TV's call sign was changed to WWBT. Raycom Media later purchased the television station. Jefferson Standard would have been interested in buying the radio stations as well. However, WBT, like WRVA, was a 50,000-watt "flamethrower"; the two stations' nighttime signals would have blanketed most of the eastern half of the continent between them. At the time, the FCC normally did not allow common ownership of clear-channel stations with overlapping nighttime signals. When it became clear that the FCC and Justice Department would not even consider a waiver that would have given one company control of two of the South's most powerful AM stations, Jefferson Standard decided against buying the AM station.

The radio stations went through several owners after Larus and Brother, including Southern Broadcasting, Harte-Hanks, Edens Broadcasting and Force II Communications, LP, before they were purchased in 1992 by Clear Channel Communications, the forerunner to today's iHeartMedia.

In November 2004, a station using the call sign WRVA-FM began serving the Raleigh-Durham market of North Carolina at 100.7 MHz. It was able to have those call letters because it was also owned by Clear Channel. This station became WRDU in 2013.

On November 1, 2017, iHeartMedia announced that WRVA, along with its sister stations in Richmond and Chattanooga, would be sold to Entercom after that company's merger with CBS Radio. The sale was completed on December 19, 2017. Entercom changed its name to Audacy in 2021.

=== WRVA at Library of Virginia ===
WRVA is the subject of a major exhibit at the Library of Virginia in Richmond. Featured are historical documents, sound files, print artifacts, and such local interest items as the shoes of the late announcer Alden Aaroe, who founded an annual program that has raised over $5.6 million to provide shoes for needy children over a 36-year period.

== FM translator ==
On May 5, 2014, WRVA began simulcasting on FM translator 98.5 W253BI (licensed to Glen Allen, Virginia) via WTVR-FM's HD2 subchannel. The simulcast ended on July 23, 2015, to make way for an HD-fed country station, branded as "Big 98.5."

On January 1, 2018, after Entercom acquired the station, WRVA began simulcasting on FM translator W241AP (96.1 MHz) in Midlothian, again using WTVR-FM's HD2 subchannel. The translator had previously rebroadcast Liberty University's WRVL and a classic rock format.

Broadcast translator for WTVR-HD2
Call sign	Frequency	City of license	FID	ERP (W)	HAAT	Class	Transmitter coordinates	FCC info
W241AP	96.1 FM	Midlothian, Virginia	139538	145	255.2 m (837 ft)	D	37°30′31.5″N 77°34′37.0″W	LMS

== See also ==
- Alden Aaroe
- John Harding
- Millard the Mallard
- Library of Virginia online exhibit "WRVA - The Voice of Virginia"
