= WRNL =

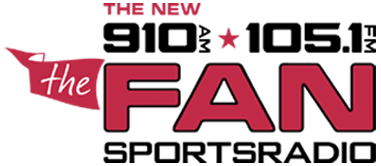
- Richmond, Virginia; United States
- Broadcast area: Metro Richmond
- Frequency: 910 kHz
- Branding: 910 AM 105.1 FM The Fan

Programming
- Language: English
- Format: Sports radio
- Affiliations: BetMGM Network; Westwood One Sports; Motor Racing Network; Richmond Flying Squirrels; VCU Rams; Virginia Tech Hokies; Washington Capitals; Washington Commanders; Washington Nationals; Washington Wizards

Ownership
- Owner: Audacy, Inc.; (Audacy License, LLC)
- Sister stations: WBTJ; WRVA; WRVQ; WRXL; WTVR-FM (HD2)

History
- First air date: December 13, 1926
- Former call signs: WLBG (1926–32); WPHR (1932–37); WRNL (1937–93); WRVH (1993–96)
- Former frequencies: 332.5 meters (1926–27); 1360 kHz (1927); 1400 kHz (1927–28); 1200 kHz (1928–35); 880 kHz (1935–41)
- Call sign meaning: Richmond News Leader (former owner)

Technical information
- Licensing authority: FCC
- Facility ID: 11960
- Class: B
- Power: 5,000 watts day; 1,500 watts night
- Transmitter coordinates: 37°36′50.5″N 77°30′51.9″W
- Translator: 105.1 W286DJ (Richmond)
- Repeater: 94.5 WRVQ-HD2 (Richmond)

Links
- Public license information: Public file; LMS
- Webcast: Listen live (via Audacy)
- Website: www.audacy.com/thefanrichmond

WRNL (910 AM, "910 AM 105.1 FM The Fan") is a commercial radio station licensed to Richmond, Virginia. WRNL features a sports radio format and is owned and operated by Audacy, Inc. The studios, offices and transmitter are all co-located just north of the Richmond city line on Basie Road in Dumbarton, Virginia.

By day, WRNL has a power of 5,000 watts non-directional. To avoid interfering with other stations on 910 AM, at night it reduces power to 1,000 watts and uses a directional antenna. WRNL is licensed by the FCC to broadcast in the HD Radio (hybrid) format. The station also broadcasts on 250 watt FM translator W286DJ at 105.1 MHz. It is also heard on the HD2 signal of sister station 94.5 WRVQ.

== Programming ==
Weekday mornings begin with "The Sports Junkies", syndicated from co-owned WJFK-FM in Washington, D.C. Adam Epstein does a local midday show, WJFK's "Grant and Danny" air in afternoon drive, and the BetMGM Network and Infinity Sports Network is heard during the rest of the schedule. WRNL is the flagship station for Virginia Commonwealth University Rams men's basketball, Virginia Tech Hokies football and men's basketball, and Richmond Flying Squirrels minor league baseball. WRNL is an affiliate for the Washington Commanders Radio Network, although conflicts often shift Commanders games to sister stations WRVA or WRXL.

== History ==
=== WLBG and WPHR ===
WRNL is among the oldest stations in Richmond. Station WLBG, broadcasting on 332.5 meters (902 kHz) with 100 watts from Petersburg, was granted a license on December 13, 1926. The owner was Robert Allen Gamble. In 1931, WLBG, Inc. was created to hold the license, and Gamble sold it to local tobacco businessmen the following year.

On August 27, 1935, WLBG, Inc. was sold to a group of three – Richmond News Leader publisher John Stewart Bryan, his son D. Tennant Bryan, and the paper's editor Douglas Southall Freeman.

As WPHR, a daytimer required to sign off at sunset, the station joined the Virginia Broadcasting Network, a five-station group headed by WCHV Charlottesville, on February 1, 1936. Although a planned 16-hour day of common programming failed in three months due to high costs, the network remained to carry Virginia Cavaliers football. The station's FCC record contains several dozen special authorizations to operate after sunset for football games.

=== WRNL ===
On November 14, 1937, the station began broadcasting from Richmond as WRNL, with the call sign referring to The Richmond News Leader. It broadcast on a frequency of 880 kHz at 500 watts, still daytime-only.

WRNL was granted round-the-clock operation in September 1940. Its studios were at 323 East Grace Street in Richmond, and the transmitter was in Henrico County, Virginia.

=== Newspaper ownership merger ===
On September 1, 1940, The Richmond News Leader merged with The Richmond Times-Dispatch, owner of station WRTD, a 100-watt station on 1500 kHz in Richmond. (The newspapers remained separate entities, but they were owned by the same company, Richmond Newspapers, Incorporated.) As part of the merger, WRTD voluntarily surrendered its license to the Federal Communications Commission effective midnight August 31, 1940. At the same time, WRNL became the NBC Blue Network affiliate in Richmond. WRNL simultaneously went to 100 watts of power (full-time).

With the North American Regional Broadcasting Agreement (NARBA) enacted in 1941, WRNL moved to AM 910, broadcasting at 5,000 watts. In addition to the Blue Network, WRNL was a secondary affiliate for the Mutual Broadcasting System.

In the late 1940s, the 111 Building (at 111 North Fourth Street) was built for WRNL. In 1949, it added an FM station, WRNL-FM at 102.1 MHz. For the first couple of decades, WRNL-FM simulcast its AM counterpart. By 1970, it had switched to a progressive rock format, later changing its call letters to WRXL.

=== MOR, oldies, sports ===
As network programming moved from radio to television around 1960, WRNL became a full service middle of the road station, featuring pop music, news, talk and sports. It switched to CBS Radio News as its network news service. In the 1980s, it shifted to oldies music.

In 1993, WRNL and WRXL were bought by Clear Channel Communications (now known as iHeartMedia as of 2014) for $9.75 million.

On November 1, 2017, iHeartMedia announced that WRNL, along with its sister stations in Richmond and Chattanooga, would be swapped to Entercom in exchange for selected stations in Boston and Seattle, as part of that company's merger with CBS Radio. The sale was completed on December 19, 2017. In March 2021, Entercom changed its name to Audacy, Inc.

On February 4, 2019, WRNL rebranded as "910 The Fan", matching the branding and logo as co-owned WJFK-FM 106.7 The Fan in Washington, D.C. In May 2019, the station added FM translator W286DJ and is branded as "Sportsradio 910 the Fan and now on 105.1 FM".

== Notable personalities ==
=== Carter sisters ===
WRNL provided one of the first broadcasting opportunities on a U.S. radio station for the country/folk group The Carter Family. Beginning June 1, 1943, Maybelle Carter and her daughters Helen, June and Anita using the name "The Carter Sisters and Mother Maybelle", had a program on WRNL that was sponsored by Nolde Brothers Bakery. June Carter of the daughters would later marry country singer Johnny Cash and become June Carter Cash. The Carter Sisters and Mother Maybelle would move on to WRVA radio in Richmond when WRNL moved their studios from the old World News Leader newspaper (WRNL) building to a new studio they built in Richmond and the star on the WRVA's Old Dominion Barn Dance until June 1948

=== Douglas Southall Freeman ===
In addition to being a journalist and historian, Douglas Southall Freeman was part-owner of WRNL. The editor of The Richmond News Leader, he extended his journalistic activities to broadcasting with twice-daily newscasts at 8 a.m. and noon. Among those interviewed by Freeman was poet Robert Frost, in what Frost said was his first time to knowingly appear on radio. Biographer Charles Johnson wrote about Freeman's first broadcast of each day: "He steps up to the microphone at 8:00, and thousands of Virginians mark the beginning of their day. ... They might just be beginning their day, but he has been observing the world for more than five hours and will tell them what they need to know."

=== Harmonizing Four ===
A Gospel quartet that began when its members were students at an elementary school in Richmond, the Harmonizing Four began singing on WRNL in 1943, soon after recording eight songs for Decca in New York City. Described as "the area's top quartet", the group "would have Sunday breakfast with Richmond for nearly two decades, sponsored by People's Furniture".

=== Roger Mudd ===
Mudd joined the staff of the News-Leader in 1953, then shifted to broadcast journalism with WRNL, where he became news director. That led to a career in network news with CBS and, later, NBC.

=== Ray Schreiner ===
Schreiner came to WRNL in 1950. Among other duties, he had a program, "The Mailbag". Schreiner also served as program director and covered farm news, winning a Virginia Associated Press Broadcasters' award for his work in 1959.

=== Frank Soden ===
"A large portion of Richmond’s baby-boom generation grew up with Mr. Soden’s distinctive descriptions of baseball, basketball and football games percolating in the background on radio station WRNL." Soden was general manager and executive vice president at WRNL, but he was best known for bringing sports events into the homes of people in central Virginia. He did play-by-play for the Richmond Braves and Richmond Virginians minor league baseball teams for three decades and broadcast University of Richmond basketball (24 years) and football (11 years) and Virginia Tech football (12 years). Soden's accolades included a Lifetime Achievement Award from the Richmond Broadcasting Hall of Fame, two awards as Virginia's Sportscaster of the Year from the National Sportscasters and Sportswriters Association and induction into six halls of fame.

=== Eddie Weaver ===
Organist Eddie Weaver, who played at the famous Byrd Theater in Richmond, was also heard in many homes via WRNL. His weekday morning program, "Eddie Weaver's Open House", featured music and chatter. The program began in September 1949 and was still going strong a decade later.

== Honors ==
Year	Recipient	Award	Organization
1951	Dr. Douglas Southall Freeman	Best news commentary over larger radio stations	Virginia Associated Press Broadcasters
1951	Howard Hamrick	Best comprehensive news broadcast over Class 1 stations	Virginia Associated Press Broadcasters
1955	WRNL	Douglas Southall Freeman Award for public service in radio journalism	Virginia Associated Press Broadcasters
1966	WRNL	Douglas Southall Freeman Award for public service in radio journalism	Virginia Associated Press Broadcasters
1966	Ken Collins	Metropolitan radio interview	Virginia Associated Press Broadcasters
1969	WRNL	Best documentary—metropolitan radio	Virginia Associated Press Broadcasters
1970	WRNL	Douglas Southall Freeman Award	Virginia Associated Press Broadcasters
