= Alden Aaroe =

American journalist

Alden Peterson Aaroe (May 5, 1918 – July 7, 1993) was a broadcast journalist and announcer for WRVA, a radio station in Richmond, Virginia.

== Career ==
Before coming to WRVA, Aaroe was a newscaster at WCHV in Charlottesville, Virginia, 1939–1941.

Aaroe worked for more than 40 years at WRVA, an AM radio station known as the "50,000 watt Voice of Virginia". As a radio personality, Aaroe is remembered for his news reporting and his bantering with a fictional duck called "Millard the Mallard" during morning rush hour in Richmond during the 1970s. In 1991, Aaroe hosted a regular segment aimed at senior citizens called "For 55 Plus" on Sunday newscasts for WRIC-TV, which broadcasts on Channel 8 in Richmond.

Aaroe also founded the WRVA-Salvation Army Shoe Fund, which provides shoes for needy children and has raised $5.6 million in its 36-year history. In 1986, Virginia Governor Gerald Baliles proclaimed Alden Aaroe Day in honor of his public service.

In 1993, Alden Aaroe died of cancer after a long illness. His funeral was held at St. Paul's Episcopal Church, located across the street from the site of the former WRVA studio where Aaroe first served. He was buried in Richmond's Hollywood Cemetery. The Shoe Fund, now called the WRVA/Salvation Army Alden Aaroe Shoe Fund, still provides approximately 2,500 children with new shoes each year.

== Honors ==
- In 1989 Aaroe was inducted into the Virginia Communications Hall of Fame.
- In 1994, the Senate and House of Delegates of the Virginia General Assembly passed a joint resolution honoring the late Aaroe for "his contributions to the field of broadcasting and his lifetime service to the people of the Commonwealth."
- In 1994, the book Alden Aaroe: Voice of the Morning (ISBN 0-87517-072-2) was written and published by Richmond-Times-Dispatch feature columnist Steve Clark.
- A street in the Church Hill section of Richmond, Alden Aaroe Way, was named for Aaroe. It is a cul-de-sac with a small park adjacent to the former WRVA studios and it overlooks Shockoe Bottom and the Virginia State Capitol on Capitol Hill.
- In 1994, the Alden Aaroe Scholarship for journalism students at Virginia Commonwealth University in Richmond was established in Aaroe's honor by his widow Frances Aaroe.
- At the Library of Virginia in Richmond, WRVA sound recordings and other artifacts were the subject of a major online exhibit. Included in this exhibit was a pair of Aaroe's shoes.
