= Dumbarton, Virginia =

- Census-designated place
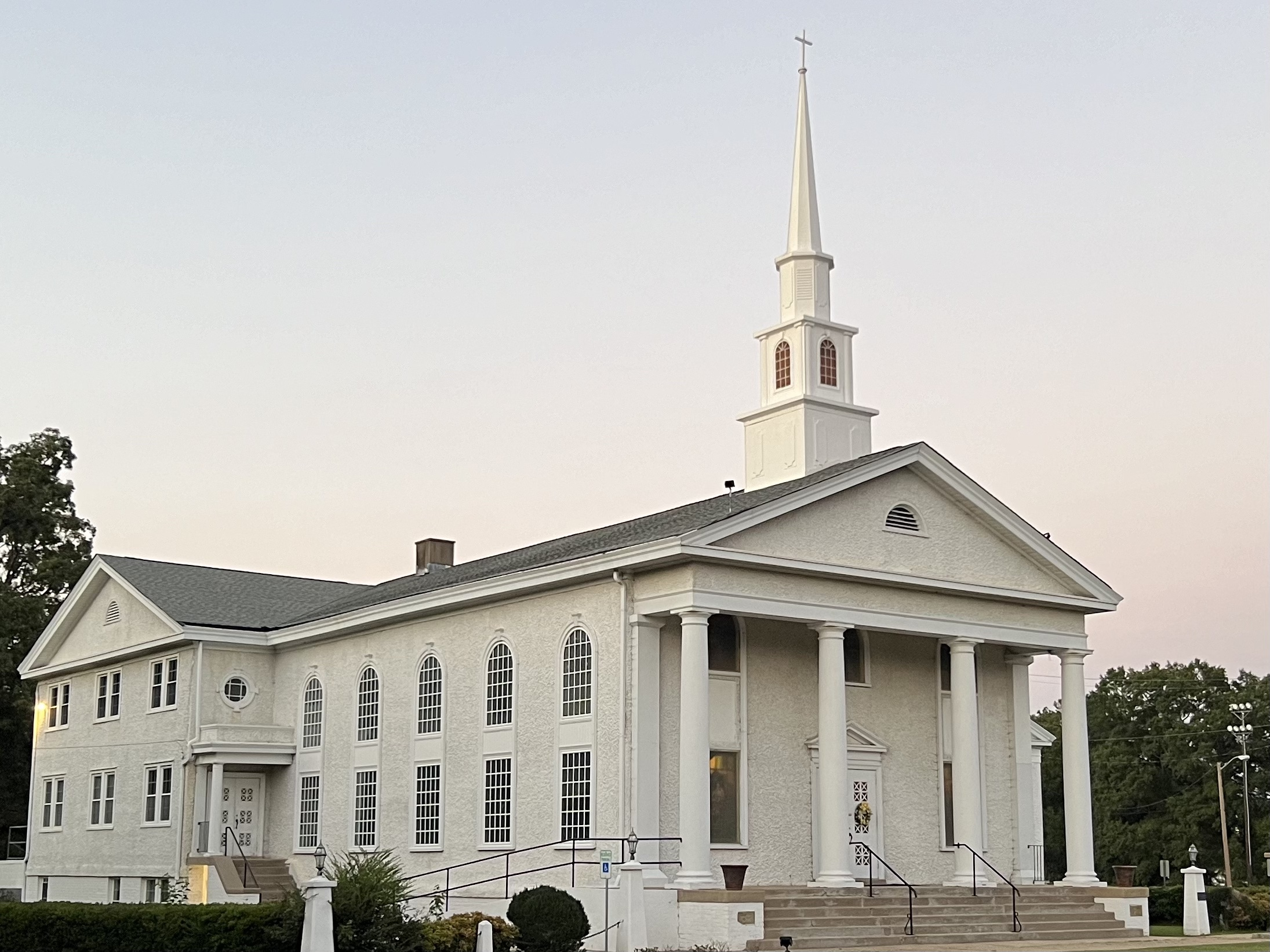
- Bethlehem Baptist Church in Dumbarton.

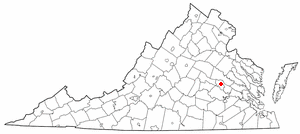
- Location of Dumbarton, Virginia
- Coordinates: 37°36′33″N 77°30′22″W
- Country: United States
- State: Virginia
- County: Henrico

Area
  - Total: 1.9 sq mi (4.9 km^{2})
  - Land: 1.9 sq mi (4.9 km^{2})
  - Water: 0 sq mi (0.0 km^{2})
- Elevation: 200 ft (61 m)

Population (2010)
  - Total: 7,879
  - Density: 4,200/sq mi (1,600/km^{2})
- Time zone: UTC−5 (Eastern (EST))
  - Summer (DST): UTC−4 (EDT)
- FIPS code: 51-23744
- GNIS feature ID: 1499361

Dumbarton is a census-designated place (CDP) in Henrico County, Virginia, United States. As of the 2020 census, Dumbarton had a population of 8,506.

== Geography ==
Dumbarton is located at 37°36′33″N 77°30′22″W (37.609295, −77.506031).

According to the United States Census Bureau, the CDP has a total area of 1.9 square miles (4.9 km^{2}), of which 1.9 square miles (4.9 km^{2}) is land and 0.019 square miles (0.049 km^{2}), or 0.99%, is water.

== Demographics ==
Historical population
Census	Pop.	Note	%±
1980	8,149		—
1990	8,526		4.6%
2000	6,674		−21.7%
2010	7,879		18.1%
2020	8,506		8.0%
U.S. Decennial Census; 1950 1960 1970; 1980 1990 2000; 2010

Dumbarton was first listed as a census designated place in the 1980 U.S. census.

=== Racial and ethnic composition ===
Dumbarton CDP, Virginia – Racial and ethnic composition Note: the US Census treats Hispanic/Latino as an ethnic category. This table excludes Latinos from the racial categories and assigns them to a separate category. Hispanics/Latinos may be of any race.
Race / Ethnicity (NH = Non-Hispanic)	Pop 2000	Pop 2010	Pop 2020	% 2000	% 2010	% 2020
White alone (NH)	3,937	3,202	2,992	58.99%	40.64%	35.18%
Black or African American alone (NH)	1,912	2,485	2,572	28.65%	31.54%	30.24%
Native American or Alaska Native alone (NH)	17	22	22	0.25%	0.28%	0.26%
Asian alone (NH)	374	472	690	5.60%	5.99%	8.11%
Native Hawaiian or Pacific Islander alone (NH)	0	7	4	0.00%	0.09%	0.05%
Other race alone (NH)	19	36	63	0.28%	0.46%	0.74%
Mixed race or Multiracial (NH)	142	187	349	2.13%	2.37%	4.10%
Hispanic or Latino (any race)	273	1,468	1,814	4.09%	18.63%	21.33%
Total	6,674	7,879	8,506	100.00%	100.00%	100.00%

=== 2000 census ===
As of the census of 2000, there were 6,674 people, 3,515 households, and 1,507 families residing in the CDP. The population density was 3,191.8 people per square mile (1,232.9/km^{2}). There were 3,782 housing units at an average density of 1,808.7/sq mi (698.7/km^{2}). The racial makeup of the CDP was 60.41% White, 28.93% African American, 0.27% Native American, 11.2% Asian, 0.01% Pacific Islander, 2.20% from other races, and 2.53% from two or more races. Hispanic or Latino of any race were 4.09% of the population.

There were 3,515 households, out of which 19.9% had children under the age of 18 living with them, 25.7% were married couples living together, 13.8% had a female householder with no husband present, and 57.1% were non-families. 47.6% of all households were made up of individuals, and 20.3% had someone living alone who was 65 years of age or older. The average household size was 1.89 and the average family size was 2.72.

In the CDP, the population was spread out, with 18.4% under the age of 18, 11.9% from 18 to 24, 33.4% from 25 to 44, 16.1% from 45 to 64, and 20.3% who were 65 years of age or older. The median age was 35 years. For every 100 females, there were 78.6 males. For every 100 females age 18 and over, there were 74.2 males.

The median income for a household in the CDP was $33,300, and the median income for a family was $39,583. Males had a median income of $29,682 versus $23,549 for females. The per capita income for the CDP was $21,446. About 5.7% of families and 8.3% of the population were below the poverty line, including 10.2% of those under age 18 and 3.0% of those age 65 or over.
