= Greater Richmond Region =

Richmond-Petersburg
- Metropolitan Statistical Area
- Richmond, VA Metropolitan Statistical Area
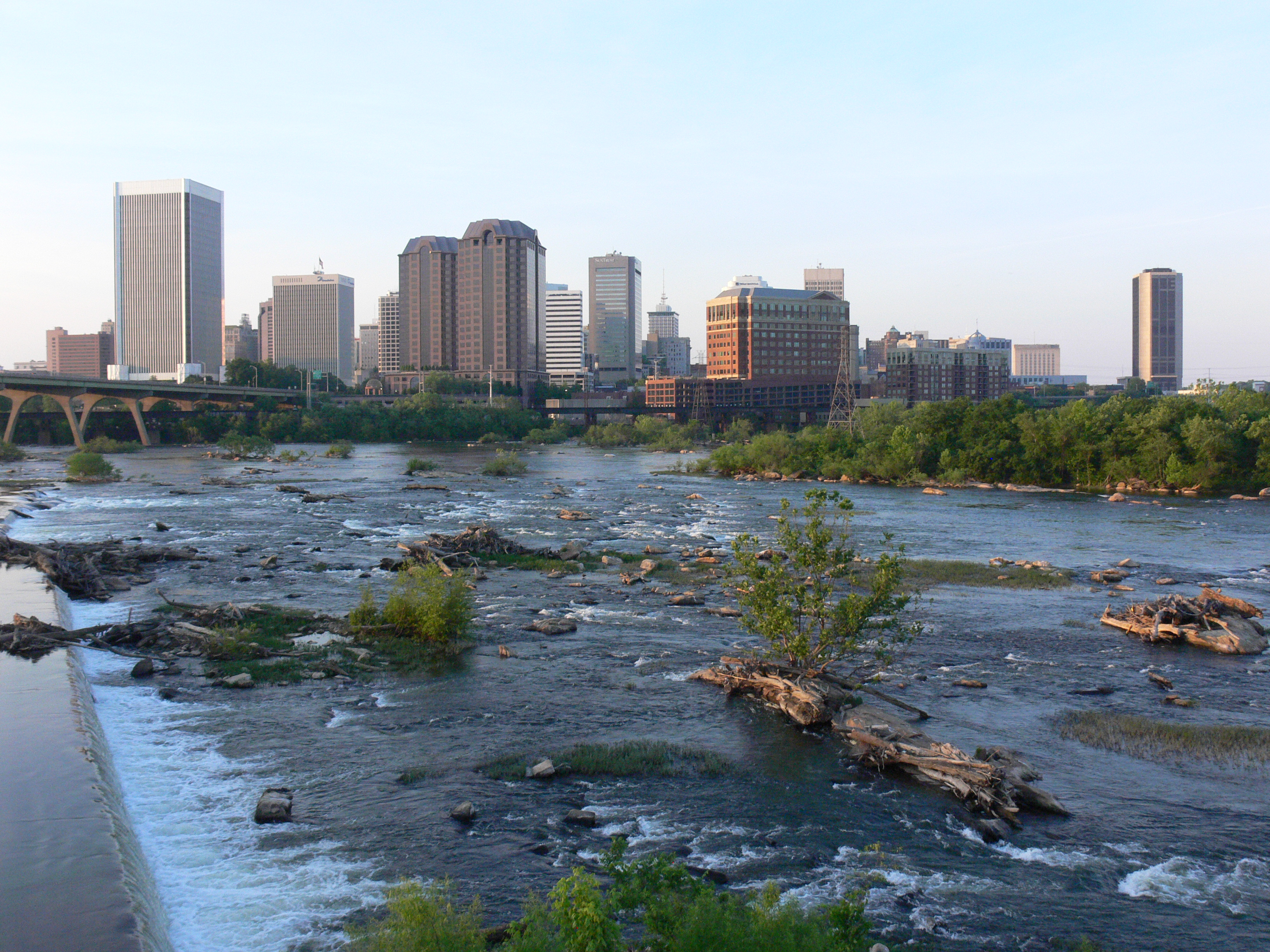
- Richmond from Falls of the James
Map of Richmond, VA MSA
City of Richmond
Greater Richmond
Tri-Cities Area
- Country: United States
- Largest city: Richmond
- Other cities: Petersburg; Hopewell; Colonial Heights

Area
  - Total: 4,367 sq mi (11,310 km^{2})

Population
  - Total: 1,314,434
  - Rank: 44th-largest in the U.S.

GDP
  - Total: $116.960 billion (2023)

The Greater Richmond Region, also known as the Richmond metropolitan area or Central Virginia (Note: Other regions in Virginia west of the Richmond region, like the areas surrounding Charlottesville and Lynchburg, can be and also have been described as Central Virginia; sometimes central Virginia is defined as all of these regions, whereas sometimes "central Virginia" means only one, including cases where it is used to describe areas that are not part of the Richmond region.), is a region and metropolitan area in the U.S. state of Virginia, centered on Richmond. The U.S. Office of Management and Budget (OMB) defines the area as the Richmond, VA Metropolitan Statistical Area, a metropolitan statistical area (MSA) used by the U.S. Census Bureau and other entities. The OMB defines the area as comprising 17 county-level jurisdictions, including the independent cities of Richmond, Petersburg, Hopewell, and Colonial Heights. As of 2020, it had a population of 1,314,434, making it the 44th largest MSA in the country.

The Greater Richmond Region is located in the central part of Virginia. It straddles the Fall Line, where the coastal plain and the Piedmont come together on the James River at Richmond and the Appomattox River at Petersburg. The English established each as a colonial port in the 17th century. The Greater Richmond Metro region is considered to be the southern extension of the Northeast megalopolis.

== Political subdivisions and communities ==
=== Independent cities ===
Since a state constitutional change in 1871, all incorporated cities in Virginia have been independent cities and are not legally located in any county. The OMB considers these independent cities to be county-equivalents to define MSAs in Virginia. Each MSA is listed by its counties, then cities, each in alphabetical order and not by size.

The area includes four independent cities (listed in order of population):

- Richmond
- Petersburg
- Hopewell
- Colonial Heights

The three smaller cities (Petersburg, Hopewell, and Colonial Heights) are located near each other in an area south of Richmond and are known collectively as the "Tri-Cities".

=== Counties ===
The following counties are included in the Richmond MSA:

- Amelia County
- Charles City County
- Chesterfield County
- Dinwiddie County
- Goochland County
- Hanover County
- Henrico County
- King and Queen County
- King William County
- New Kent County
- Powhatan County
- Prince George County
- Sussex County

=== Incorporated towns ===
- Town of Ashland (located in Hanover County)
- Town of West Point (located in King William County)
- Town of McKenney (located in Dinwiddie County)
- Town of Wakefield (located in Sussex County)
- Town of Waverly (located in Sussex County)
- Town of Stony Creek (located in Sussex County)

=== Selected unincorporated towns and communities ===
The Richmond-Petersburg metropolitan area includes many unincorporated towns and communities.

Note: This is only a partial listing.

- Amelia Court House
- Atlee
- Bon Air
- Centralia
- Chester
- Chesterfield
- Disputanta
- Enon
- Ettrick
- Fair Oaks
- Fort Gregg-Adams
- Glen Allen
- Highland Springs
- Lakeside
- Laurel
- Matoaca
- Mechanicsville
- Midlothian
- Montrose
- Moseley
- New Bohemia
- Prince George
- Sandston
- Short Pump
- Solomons Store
- Tuckahoe
- Varina
- Winterpock

== Population ==
Historical population
Census	Pop.	Note	%±
1900	143,651		—
1910	172,364		20.0%
1920	211,135		22.5%
1930	236,957		12.2%
1940	262,991		11.0%
1950	350,035		33.1%
1960	436,044		24.6%
1970	518,319		18.9%
1980	761,311		46.9%
1990	865,640		13.7%
2000	1,100,121		27.1%
2010	1,188,246		8.0%
2020	1,314,434		10.6%

The Richmond Metropolitan Statistical Area (MSA), which includes three other cities (Petersburg, Hopewell, and Colonial Heights) and adjacent counties, is home to approximately 1.3 million Virginians or 15.1% of Virginia's population. The Richmond region is growing steadily, adding nearly 400,000 residents in the past two decades. This has resulted in major suburban sprawl, particularly in Henrico and Chesterfield Counties, which have populations over 300,000. This also resulted in boosts in its economy, the building of malls, more national attention, and major sporting events and concerts coming to Richmond. Its arts and culture scene has also seen a major gain, with the building or renovations of many new arenas, including the Landmark Theater, Carpenter Center, CenterStage, and the creation of an art walk, the First Fridays Art Walk, occurring on the first Friday of every month on Broad Street in Downtown Richmond, drawing crowds of over 20,000 people. The population has seen its ups and downs, with the city of Richmond itself dropping down to 197,790 as of the 2000 census but rising back to 233,665 by the 2024 estimate.

The region is located approximately equidistant from Northern Virginia, Hampton Roads, and Charlottesville. The area is home to the state's center of gravity of population—which, in 1980, was located thirty miles west of Richmond near the Powhatan-Goochland County border.

The median age for the MSA was 36.7 years. For people reporting one race alone, 66 percent were White; 30 percent were Black or African American; less than 0.5 percent were American Indian and Alaskan Native; 2.75 percent were Asian; less than 0.5 percent were Native Hawaiian and Other Pacific Islander, and 1 percent were some other race. One percent reported two or more races. Three percent of the people in the Richmond/Petersburg MSA were Hispanic. Sixty-three percent of the people in the Richmond/Petersburg MSA were White non-Hispanic. People of Hispanic origin may be of any race. The median house income for the MSA was $59,468. The median family income was $65,289. The Per Capita income was $27,887. In 2004, seven percent of people were in poverty. Poverty status is determined by the U.S. Census Bureau and is based on family composition, size, and income level. In the Richmond/Petersburg MSA, nine percent of children under age 18 were below the poverty line, and eight percent of people 65 years old and over were below the poverty line. Five percent of all families, and 15 percent of families with a female householder and no husband present had incomes below the poverty level. The unemployment rate was 4.6%.

In 2004, there were 397,000 households in the Richmond/Petersburg MSA. The average household size was 2.6 people.

In 2004, 85 percent of people 25 years and over had at least graduated from high school, and 33 percent had a bachelor's degree or higher. Among people 16 to 19 years old, nine percent were not in school; they were not enrolled and had not graduated from high school.

County	2025 Estimate	2020 Census	Change	Area	Density
Chesterfield County	397,148	364,548	+8.94%	423 sq mi (1,100 km^{2})	939/sq mi (363/km^{2})
Henrico County	342,775	334,389	+2.51%	237.65 sq mi (615.5 km^{2})	1,442/sq mi (557/km^{2})
Richmond City	237,257	226,610	+4.70%	59.92 sq mi (155.2 km^{2})	3,960/sq mi (1,529/km^{2})
Hanover County	116,423	109,979	+5.86%	469 sq mi (1,210 km^{2})	248/sq mi (96/km^{2})
Prince George County	43,936	43,010	+2.15%	265 sq mi (690 km^{2})	166/sq mi (64/km^{2})
Petersburg City	33,734	33,458	+0.82%	22.72 sq mi (58.8 km^{2})	1,485/sq mi (573/km^{2})
Powhatan County	32,591	30,033	+8.52%	260 sq mi (670 km^{2})	125/sq mi (48/km^{2})
Goochland County	29,187	24,727	+18.04%	281 sq mi (730 km^{2})	104/sq mi (40/km^{2})
Dinwiddie County	28,896	27,947	+3.40%	504 sq mi (1,310 km^{2})	57/sq mi (22/km^{2})
New Kent County	28,022	22,945	+22.13%	210 sq mi (540 km^{2})	133/sq mi (52/km^{2})
Hopewell City	23,261	23,033	+0.99%	10.35 sq mi (26.8 km^{2})	2,247/sq mi (868/km^{2})
King William County	19,617	17,810	+10.15%	274 sq mi (710 km^{2})	72/sq mi (28/km^{2})
Colonial Heights City	18,738	18,170	+3.13%	7.52 sq mi (19.5 km^{2})	2,492/sq mi (962/km^{2})
Amelia County	13,632	13,265	+2.77%	355 sq mi (920 km^{2})	38/sq mi (15/km^{2})
Sussex County	10,755	10,829	−0.68%	490 sq mi (1,300 km^{2})	22/sq mi (8/km^{2})
King and Queen County	6,743	6,608	+2.04%	315 sq mi (820 km^{2})	21/sq mi (8/km^{2})
Charles City County	6,623	6,773	−2.21%	183 sq mi (470 km^{2})	36/sq mi (14/km^{2})
Total	1,389,338	1,314,134	+5.72%	4,367.16 sq mi (11,310.9 km^{2})	318/sq mi (123/km^{2})

== Travel and tourism ==
=== Expressways and Interstate highways ===
Several of the most heavily traveled highways in the state transverse the area, which includes the junctions of Interstate 64 (I-64; which runs east-west), and Interstate Highways 85 and 95 (which run north-south). A comprehensive network of Interstate bypasses and spurs and several non-interstate expressways also serve the area. Tolls fund several of these local roads, although tolls have long been removed from the area's first limited access highway, the Richmond-Petersburg Turnpike, which opened in 1958 and now forms a portion of I-95 and I-85. I-295 opened in 1992. It was the last segment of Virginia's interstate system, forming an eastern bypass of Richmond and Petersburg.

=== Railway network ===
The Richmond-Petersburg region is also located along several major rail lines operated by CSX Transportation, Norfolk Southern Railway, and the Buckingham Branch Railroad.

The area has four passenger stations served by Amtrak:

- Main Street Station (station code RVM), located in downtown Richmond
- Staples Mill Road Station (station code RVR), located in Henrico County
- Petersburg Station (station code PTB), located in Ettrick
- Ashland Station (station code ASD), located in downtown Ashland, VA

The Department of Rail and Public Transportation of the State of Virginia has studies underway for extending high-speed passenger rail service to the Virginia Peninsula and South Hampton Roads areas with a rail connection at Richmond to service along both the Northeast Corridor and the Southeast High Speed Rail Corridor.

Another project, known as Transdominion Express, would extend from Richmond west to Lynchburg and from Washington, DC (Alexandria) south via an existing Virginia Railway Express route to Manassas, extending on south to Charlottesville, Lynchburg, Roanoke and Bristol on the Tennessee border.

=== Sea and airport facilities ===
An international deepwater terminal is located at the Port of Richmond on the James River which is navigable for shipping to Hampton Roads, the Chesapeake Bay, and the Atlantic Ocean.

Richmond International Airport is located in Henrico County, five miles east of the city center. The airport serves domestic destinations, primarily in the Midwest, South, and Northeast, and as recently as the 2010s, it served international destinations, including Canada, Mexico, and the Bahamas.

In recent years, it has seen remarkable growth in demand, adding non-stop routes such as San Francisco, Las Vegas, Los Angeles, New Orleans, and Phoenix–Sky Harbor, with seasonal routes to Providence and Minneapolis/St. Paul, among other destinations.

== Politics ==
The Virginia State Capitol is in the historic Capitol Square. Also, the new U.S. Courthouse was opened in 2010, and the United States Court of Appeals for the Fourth Circuit is located in Richmond, as well, along with the Federal Reserve Bank of Richmond.

Richmond itself and Petersburg are strongly Democratic. The suburbs began trending Republican nationally as early as the 1950s; Henrico County, for instance, went Republican in every election from 1952 to 2004. However, conservative Byrd Democrats continued to hold most suburban local offices and state legislative seats well into the 1980s.

The region switched, mirroring an affluent suburban trend across the country, from majority Republican back to majority Democratic in voting patterns between the 2004 re-election of George W. Bush and the 2008 election of Barack Obama—the first Democrat to carry the metropolitan area in many decades. Since then, it has remained solidly Democratic at the presidential level and, along with Northern Virginia, has kept the state of Virginia in the Democratic column. Donald Trump received a lower percentage of the regional vote in each of three elections (2016, 2020, 2024) than any Republican presidential candidate since Thomas Dewey in the 1940s.

Presidential election results
Year	GOP	DEM	Others
2024	42.4% 309,200	55.8% 406,726	1.8% 13,215
2020	41.9% 300,888	56.3% 404,445	1.8% 12,641
2016	42.3% 271,507	52.0% 333,376	5.7% 36,712
2012	46.4% 289,127	52.2% 325,265	1.4% 8,694
2008	46.5% 291,304	52.8% 330,528	0.7% 4,369
2004	55.0% 287,810	44.4% 232,240	0.6% 3,239
2000	54.4% 239,734	43.1% 189,867	2.6% 11,269
1996	50.6% 200,687	42.4% 168,190	6.9% 27,387
1992	44.9% 184,241	40.0% 164,116	15.0% 61,538
1988	62.4% 224,861	36.7% 132,277	0.9% 3,406
1984	64.1% 231,956	35.4% 128,044	0.5% 1,792
1980	55.9% 178,936	39.5% 126,245	4.6% 14,797
1976	53.8% 155,979	44.1% 127,693	2.1% 6,044
1972	70.5% 176,154	27.8% 69,598	1.7% 4,185
1968	46.5% 109,988	30.8% 72,876	22.7% 53,648
1964	55.1% 103,295	44.9% 84,184	0.1% 144
1960	58.4% 75,523	40.9% 52,945	0.7% 905

== Economy ==
The applicable Metropolitan Statistical Area for the Richmond-Petersburg region is the Richmond, VA MSA. The Richmond MSA has a regional workforce population of over 677,000 people, drawn from across the metro area and beyond due to its central location, major employers, and higher education institutions.

As of 2024, the Richmond metropolitan area supports approximately 741,000 jobs (nonfarm). The region has a highly diversified labor market, with the largest employment sectors being trade, transportation, and utilities (~138,000 jobs); professional and business services (~121,000); government (~120,000); education and health services (~117,000); and leisure and hospitality (~69,000).

Important manufacturing categories in the region include tobacco, chemicals, printing and publishing, paper, and wood products.

This economic diversity, typical of the entire Richmond-Petersburg region, helps insulate it from hardship due to economic fluctuation in particular sectors of the economy. The region's central location also allows it to benefit from growth in other regions of Virginia and the state as a whole.

=== Economic and community development ===
Several economic and community development entities, both public and private, serve the Greater Richmond area. Government-linked entities such as the Greater Richmond Partnership bring together elected leadership of local government with leaders from business and industry to coordinate initiatives to foster economic prosperity. In the non-profit sector, The Community Foundation for a greater Richmond, one of the largest Community Foundations in the country, supports a wide range of projects with both competitive results-based grants and donor-directed philanthropy as well as more than 60 academic scholarship programs.

Commonwealth Fusion Systems has announced plans to build the world's first grid-scale commercial nuclear fusion power plant at the James River Industrial Center in Chesterfield County; the plant is intended to produce about 400 MW of power.

== Culture ==
=== Arts ===
A community-based organization, James River Writers, serves the Greater Richmond Region. It sponsors many writer programs for all career stages, and an annual writers' conference that draws attendees from near and far.

The region is famous for its Christmastime "tacky lights." Former Richmond mayor Dwight C. Jones called the city the tacky light capital of the world. Bus "tacky light tours" are offered.

=== Media ===
The Richmond metro area is served by many local television and radio stations. As of 2010, the Richmond-Petersburg designated market area (DMA) is the 58th largest in the U.S. with 553,950 homes according to Nielsen Market Research. The major network television affiliates are WTVR-TV 6 (CBS), WRIC-TV 8 (ABC), WWBT 12 (NBC), WRLH-TV 35 (Fox), and WUPV 65 (CW). PBS stations include WCVE-TV 23 and WCVW 57. Richmond enjoys a low power FM Station, WRIR, which features all-volunteer community supported radio at all hours.

=== Religion ===
Some 6,000 Indian families resided in the Richmond region as of 2011. Hinduism is actively practiced at several temples and cultural centers. The two best known are the Cultural Center of India (CCI), off Iron Bridge Road in Chesterfield County, and the Hindu Center of Virginia, in Henrico County, which won national acclaim as Virginia's first LEED certified religious facility.

=== Sports ===
Auto racing is also popular in the area. The Richmond Raceway (RR) has hosted NASCAR Cup Series races since 1953, and the Capital City 400 from 1962 to 1980. RR also hosted IndyCar's SunTrust Indy Challenge from 2001 to 2009. Another track, Southside Speedway, has operated from 1959 until 2020 and sat just southwest of Richmond in Chesterfield County. This .333 mi (0.536 km) oval short-track was known as the "Toughest Track in the South" and "The Action Track", featuring weekly stock car racing Friday nights. Southside Speedway saw many NASCAR champions, including Richard Petty, Bobby Allison, and Darrell Waltrip. It was the home track of Denny Hamlin.

Richmond City is home to a Minor League Baseball team, the Richmond Flying Squirrels, Double-A Affiliate of the San Francisco Giants. The Flying Squirrels play at The Diamond and are due to move into the upcoming CarMax Park for the 2026 season. Richmond plays host to two lower division soccer clubs as well, the Richmond Kickers of USL League One and Richmond Ivy of USL W League - both plying their trade at City Stadium.

=== Theme parks ===
Kings Dominion, a theme park, is located in Doswell.

== See also ==
- List of U.S. Metropolitan Statistical Areas (MSA) in Virginia
