= Robert Llewellyn (photographer) =

American photographer (born 1945)

Robert B. Llewellyn
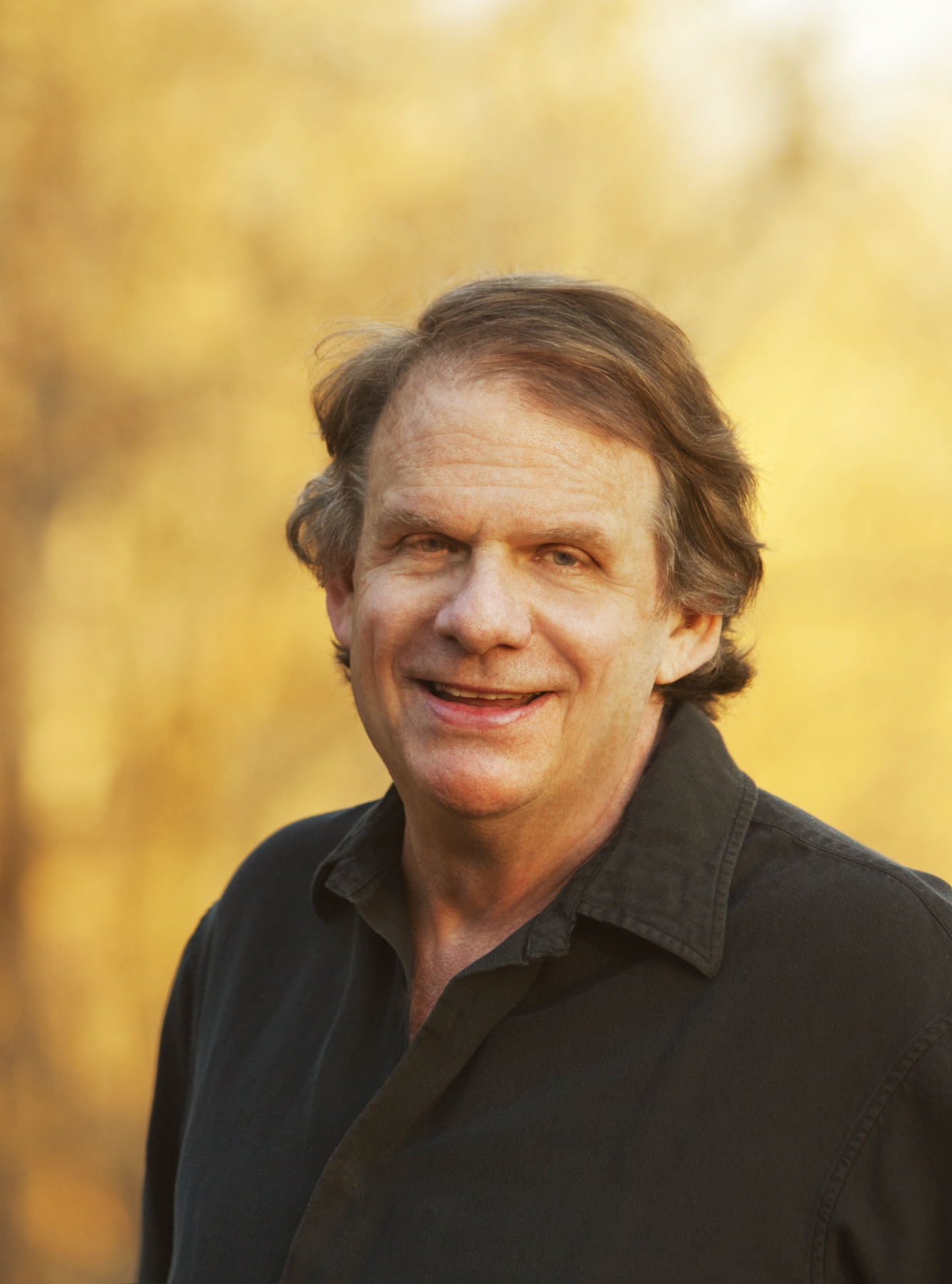
- Born: Robert Boxley Llewellyn III; December 29, 1945 (age 80); Roanoke, Virginia, U.S.
- Other name: Bob
- Occupation: photographer
- Years active: 1968–present
- Known for: 35 books of his photography over 40 years
- Notable work: Washington, The Capital (1981); Remarkable Trees of Virginia (2008); Seeing Trees: Discover the Extraordinary Secrets of Everyday Trees (2011); The Living Forest: A Visual Journey Into the Heart of the Woods (2017)

Robert Llewellyn (born December 29, 1945) is an American photographer whose images have served as the basis for numerous books and exhibits. He studied engineering science at the University of Virginia, and photography with Imogen Cunningham in the 1960s. He married Barbara Reading Grant in 1981 and they live together in Earlysville, Virginia.

Thirty five books have been based on Llewellyn's photographs, which have also been featured in numerous art exhibits. His Washington, The Capital (1981) was an official diplomatic gift of the White House and U.S. State Department. With Remarkable Trees of Virginia (2008), the capstone of a statewide effort to document Virginia's most remarkable trees, Llewellyn developed a special focus on photography of landscapes and trees. Seeing Trees: Discover the Extraordinary Secrets of Everyday Trees was published in 2011 through Timber Press with 180 of his photographs, Seeing Flowers (2013) included 181 Llewellyn photographs, and Seeing Seeds (2015) presented over 200.

The Living Forest: A Visual Journey Into the Heart of the Woods, considered a "spectacular journey deep into the heart of the forest," includes 305 of Llewellyn's photographs displayed with the writing of Joan Maloof. It was published through Timber Press in 2017.

== Biography ==
=== Early ===
Robert Boxley Llewellyn, III was born on December 29, 1945, in Roanoke, Virginia to Mary Alice (née Kent) and Robert Boxley Llewellyn, Jr., a regional manager for an investor service. Llewellyn grew up in nearby South Boston, Virginia. His older sister Mary Barbara Llewellyn was born November 10, 1942, in Newport News, Virginia.

Robert Boxley Llewellyn, Sr. was manager of the family harness shop in South Boston, while Llewellyn's maternal grandfather, Walter Glass Kent, served as station manager for the Norfolk and Western Railroad in Vinton, Virginia (a town bordering Roanoke). Llewellyn's father, Robert Boxley Llewellyn, Jr., born in 1918 in Prince Edward County, Virginia, was working as a surveyor's assistant when he joined the Army in 1944. He served in the 8th Army Infantry during the Asiatic-Pacific Campaign as First lieutenant through 1946. He died in 1957 in Winston-Salem, North Carolina where he worked at the time.

Llewellyn's mother, born August 2, 1918, in Halifax, Virginia, married his father on June 28, 1941, in Vinton. She was graduated from Jefferson High School in Roanoke in 1936, where she was considered "(a)n artistic and ambitious Vintonian". She attended the State Normal School for Women at Harrisonburg — which later became James Madison University — graduating in 1940 with a focus in studio arts. She died October 23, 1947.

=== Education ===
Llewellyn first worked with a camera in high school. He became editor of the yearbook his senior year, "tasked with documenting student life." He walked around campus with a Nikon camera around his neck the entire year. He recalls:

I was amazed at how the camera changes you. I was sort of invisible before, and then suddenly with a camera, it's a whole different interaction. The wonderful thing about photography is that everything shows up as new. You see things that make you say, 'Wow.'

In 1963, Llewellyn was among 20 Virginia high school students selected to participate in "one-of-a-kind electronics program" coordinated by the Roanoke school system with the University of Virginia. He attended the University of Virginia in Charlottesville between 1964 and 1968, studying Engineering Science. He studied photography under noted photographer Imogen Cunningham in Eureka, California in 1968.

== Washington, The Capital (1981) ==
Washington, The Capital — published with 89 photographs by Llewellyn through Thomasson-Grant, Inc. in 1981 – became, leatherbound with a gold-leaf presidential seal, the White House gift to visiting dignitaries. In this celebrated work Llewellyn concentrates on "the city as monuments, on what an explorer of some future time might find in a deserted Washington." He captures the mist rising up from the Potomac River, the sun coming up on the Jefferson Memorial, and neighborhoods like Georgetown.

Three thousand copies of the book were also accepted on behalf of the U.S. State Department to be used as an official gift to foreign dignitaries. Five major corporations, including Anheuser-Busch and Martin Marietta, used the book as a gift to visitors to the capital city. As stated on the cover: "These photographs of the capital of the New World show not only the Washington of today, but the essential Washington that may remain throughout the eternal tomorrows."

As I was making these photographs of Washington, I began to see how much the center of the city was a concentration of temples — temples dedicated to government, to power and culture, to wise men and national leaders, to the dead.

— Robert Llewellyn

The beauty of the natural setting, the city's sensuous qualities of sculpture and architecture and its unabashed grandeur are all here in fresh and surprising images.

— American Photography, May 1982

It is a collection of exquisite, formal color photographs of various landmarks and scenes showing the city as a paradise on the Potomac, devoid of people, plane crashes or urban problems.

— San Francisco Examiner

== Remarkable Trees of Virginia (2008) ==
In 2004, Llewellyn met the garden columnist of the Richmond Times-Dispatch, Nancy Ross Hugo, who was considering creating a book about Virginia trees. Their collaboration would result in three publications, the "inaugural project" being a four-year effort to document one hundred of Virginia's "largest, oldest, most historic, beautiful and beloved trees." This resulted in the 2008 publication of the "keepsake book" Remarkable Trees of Virginia with 176 of Llewellyn's photographs. The project website, as described by The Crozet Gazette, "received over a thousand nominations from across the Commonwealth" of remarkable trees. This wealth of recommendations required project co-coordinator Dr. Jeffrey Kirwan, a Virginia Tech Emeritus Professor and Extension Specialist, to log 20,000 miles traveling to visit each tree to whittle down the nominees to the one hundred included in the book.

We asked citizens to search their communities and natural areas for trees that are remarkable because of age, size, beauty, uniqueness, connection to the community, or historical and cultural significance. We were searching for trees that have unusual forms or interesting stories associated with them.

— Dr. Jeffrey Kirwan

The project proved a turning point for Llewellyn in "how he viewed forest ecosystems." As he explains:

I had always thought trees were an element of the landscape, a shape, a color. Nancy began to explain each aspect of the trees to me and a light bulb went off. They're alive. They're born and they die and it's all very well planned.

Llewellyn and Hugo followed up Remarkable Trees of Virginia, which is in its fourth printing, with Trees Up Close and Seeing Trees (2011). Several trees documented by this effort have died since publication of Remarkable Trees of Virginia, including: the 200-year-old Tulip Poplar at Monticello and the Bald cypress at Cypress Bridge. The latter, nicknamed "Big Mama" — at 123 feet tall the largest tree in Virginia – was over a thousand years old, surviving until 2008 in a swamp 80 miles southeast of Richmond. A famous "old willow oak", called the "tricycle tree" after the two young brothers who fastened a tricycle in the limbs to hoist treasures up to their tree house 1908, also passed away in Ashland.

Dr. Kirwan and Hugo had worked together previously on Virginia's Big Tree Program, which similarly encouraged the nomination of remarkable trees from communities. The Remarkable Trees database now also includes trees of Washington, D.C.

== Seeing Trees (2011) ==
Working again with Nancy Ross Hugo as writer, Llewellyn published Seeing Trees: Discover the Extraordinary Secrets of Everyday Trees with 180 of his photographs through Timber Press in 2011. In this book, Llewellyn reveals "an unexpected and alien beauty" that can be discovered in the minute detail of trees. The Virginia pine tree "sports baby, adolescent and mature cones all on the same branch." Acorns of the sawtooth oak are wrapped in tufts like sea anemones. The pink flower of the redbud looks like a hummingbird. The Washington Post said, "The authors have brought the level of observation to new heights, presenting the daintiest parts of trees — buds, flower parts and seeds in various stages of ripening — in a way that hasn't been seen, generally."

To capture such images, Llewellyn relies on "innovative digital camera technology." He mounts small sections of live samples below a vertically mounted, motorized camera. In traveling just an eighth of an inch the camera captures two dozen frames, which the computer then assembles into a composite picture of "the sharpest areas of each image".

Between [Nancy Ross Hugo]’s expansive and attentive reflections and Llewellyn's astonishing photos, [Seeing Trees and Trees Up Close] will reveal how you’ve failed to notice everything. But they also prove that it is never too late to stand still, lean in, and see.

— Richard Powers, author The Overstory (winner 2019 Pulitzer Prize for Fiction)

== The Living Forest (2017) ==
The Living Forest: A Visual Journey Into the Heart of the Woods, created with Llewellyn's images and words by Joan Maloof, a biology and environmental studies professor at Salisbury University and founder and director of the Old-Growth Forest Network, was published through Timber Press in 2017. The photographic work considers the forest as "a complex, interconnected ecosystem filled with plants, birds, mammals, insects, and fungi," making for a visual journey that immerses the reader "deep into the woods." Llewellyn's "wide-ranging photography" highlights "the small and the large, the living and the dead, and the seen and the unseen."

Llewellyn recalls how Maloof made the process more engaging:

We'd go out into the forest and she would say to me, 'Turn over that log. What do you see?' I would say, 'What will I see?' She would never tell me. It was all about discovery.

Llewellyn's 300+ "awe-inspiring photographs" accompany "lyrical essays from Joan Maloof detailing the science behind the wonder." His close-up images capture owls and hawks; his aerial photographs show herons in flight. Time-lapse photography reveals the slow changing of leaves.

Arresting photographs combine with musings about the web of life in deciduous forests in this coffee-table book.

— Publishers Weekly

In years past, Robert Llewellyn has blown our minds with the indelibly detailed photographs in "Seeing Trees," "Seeing Flowers" and "Seeing Seeds." [Here] he has teamed up with Joan Maloof, the founder and director of the Old-Growth Forest Network, to peer into the mystery and magic of our woodlands.

— Dominique Browning, The New York Times

This celebration of forests' many layers of beauty is a gift for the senses, intellect, and emotions.

— David George Haskill, The Songs of Trees

Llewellyn's research and photography of trees has led him to conclude that "We're only here to visit the trees." He adds, "They were here way before humans; they're hosting us."

== Style and technique ==
I want to know, and have always wanted to know, how everything works. Even the ubiquitous objects directly in front of me, which often go unnoticed. This urge compels me to make intimate images of my immediate landscape. Fragments of my familiar world, which are not quite new to me, but can be shockingly unique when scrutinized. These entities — which we have named trees, flowers, seeds, the forest — when deeply contemplated can open up new worlds.

— Robert Boxley Llewellyn

Llewellyn combines his knowledge of engineering and contemporary technology to create images in full focus with an alternative method he developed that provides for an unlimited depth of field. Every bud, flower, and leaf is photographed up to 50 times at various distances. The final work is a composite of the sharpest areas of each picture, resolved by software and computer. As he explains:

To make the image sharp from top to bottom, I used a technique called "focus stacking". I would put the seeds on a glowing light table and do a series of photographs at different focus points from top to bottom, overlapping the sharp parts. I then loaded the images into stacking software, which rendered one image that was perfectly sharp.

The resulting photographs have a "hyper-real clarity" which circumvents the limitations of the magnifying camera lens. The final prints are sometimes enlarged up to eight feet for closer inspection.

Llewellyn uses a Canon 5DS R for most of his photography, and a Canon 5D Mark IV high-speed camera for photographing wildlife. He deploys over a dozen different lenses, from a 2,000mm to a 10x microscopic lens. To capture wide landscapes, he takes multiple panoramic images with a 14mm lens, then "stitches" the shots together into a single panorama. One such shoot resulted in "a four-page spread featuring American beech trees."

Llewellyn's operated as a professional photographer for most of four decades out of his "house-cum-studio" overlooking the Rivanna River in Earlysville, Virginia just outside Charlottesville.

Robert Llewellyn has a photographic talent of a very high order.

— Reid Beddow, The Washington Post

== Honors, awards, and distinctions ==
- Introduced guests to the world of micro-photography at The Garden Club of Virginia's Symposium 2022, Grow Your Knowledge, September 20–21, 2022 at the Science Museum of Virginia in Richmond.
- Llewellyn was featured in the first episode of the 2019–2020 Charlottesville Inside-Out (CVIO) series with Terri Allard January 10, 2019, on WHTJ/WCVE/WVPT PBS.
- His Washington, The Capital (1981) was an official diplomatic gift of the White House and U.S. State Department.

== Exhibits ==
Robert Llewellyn's photographs have been featured in a number of exhibits, including:

- 2008 – "Remarkable Trees of Virginia" at the Norfolk Botanical Gardens in Norfolk, Virginia.
- 2008 – "Remarkable Trees of Virginia" at the Lewis Ginter Botanical Gardens in Richmond, Virginia.
- 2008 – "Remarkable Trees of Virginia" at the Edith J. Carrier Arboretum in Harrisonburg, Virginia.
- 2009 – "Remarkable Trees of Virginia" at the George Washington Birthplace National Monument in Colonial Beach, Virginia.
- 2009 – "Seeing Trees" at the Darrin-McHone Gallery in Harrisonburg, Virginia.
- 2010 – "Trees" in the Silo Installation at Firnew Gallery in Hood, Virginia.
- 2011 – "Seeing Trees" in the Speak! Gallery in Charlottesville, Virginia.
- 2011 – "Flora Photographica" at the United States Botanic Garden in Washington, DC.
- 2012 – "Natural Wonders" in the Page Bond Gallery in Richmond, Virginia.
- 2012 – "Seeing Trees" at the Lewis Ginter Botanical Gardens in Richmond, Virginia.
- 2013 – "Flower" in the Page Bond Gallery in Richmond, Virginia.
- 2013 – "Nature's Design, the Botanical Photographs of Robert Llewellyn" Greenville Museum of Art in Greenville, North Carolina.

== Bibliography ==
Robert Llewellyn's photographs have been exhibited in a number of published volumes, including:

- 1979 – Silver Wings with 44 photographs, through Casadega Group.
- 1979 - Upland Virginia with 54 photographs, through Upland Publishing.
- 1981 – Washington, The Capital with 89 photographs, through Thomasson-Grant.
- 1983 – Thomas Jefferson's Monticello with 81 photographs, through Thomasson-Grant.
- 1984 – Boston with 105 photographs, through Foremost Publishers.
- 1985 – Penn with 110 photographs, through Fort Church Publishers.
- 1985 – Virginia with 99 photographs, through Thomasson and Howell.
- 1986 – Philadelphia with 103 photographs, through Foremost Publishers.
- 1986 – MIT with 110 photographs, through Fort Church Publishers.
- 1987 – Pennsylvania with 107 photographs, through Foremost Publishers.
- 1988 – Chicago with 109 photographs, through Howell Press.
- 1988 – The Cathedral of St. Peter and St. Paul with 85 photographs, introduction by John Chancellor; through Howell Press.
- 1989 - Washington with 103 photographs, through Howell Press.
- 1989 - Georgetown: Meditation on a Bicentennial with 50 photographs, through Georgetown University Press.
- 1990 - The American University with 87 photographs, through Fort Church Publishers.
- 1991 – Reflections of Washington, DC with 216 photographs, through Gallery Books.
- 1991 – Ithaca College: A Centennial Portrait by Robert Hill with James J. Whalen; illustrated with 59 photographs, through Ithaca College.
- 1991 - Hollins: Celebrating 150 Years of Achievement, Tradition and Vision with Annie Dillard; includes 61 photographs, through Hollins College (Dai Nippon Printing Company).
- 1991 – Williamsburg/Jamestown/Yorktown with 117 photographs, through Rizzoli International.
- 1996 – The Academical Village with 56 photographs, through Thomasson, Grant & Lickle.
- 2001 – Spirits in Stone with 144 photographs, through Clarkson N. Potter Publishers.
- 2003 – Albemarle with 103 photographs, through Albemarle Books.
- 2006 – Empires in the Forest: Jamestown and the Beginning of America with Avery Chenoweth, includes 115 photographs; published through Rivanna Foundation.
- 2008 – Remarkable Trees of Virginia with 176 photographs through Albemarle Books.
- 2011 – Seeing Trees: Discover the Extraordinary Secrets of Everyday Trees with 180 photographs, through Timber Press.
- 2013 – Seeing Flowers with 181 photographs, through Timber Press.
- 2015 – Seeing Seeds with 212 photographs, through Timber Press.
- 2017 – The Living Forest: A Visual Journey Into the Heart of the Woods with Joan Maloof; including 305 photographs, through Timber Press.

== Personal ==
Robert Llewellyn married Barbara ("Bobbi") Reading Grant – a registered nurse, Licensed Clinical Social Worker, and psychotherapist — on May 23, 1981, in Albemarle County, Virginia in a Buddhist ceremony. It was his wife's second marriage, having been widowed in 1976 from her first husband. The Llewellyns have two daughters, Cara and Jenna, who live in New York City. His sister Mary Barbara, an architect in Berkeley, California, married Gerald Lee Reddan, a letterpress printer, in Eureka, California in 1974.

Llewellyn's half brother Boxley Chandler Llewellyn, a Vice President of Banking Analytics Solutions with IBM in Charlotte, North Carolina, was born February 12, 1955, in Halifax to his father's second wife Ruth Chandler Llewellyn (1922–2011). She was a public school teacher for 24 years, the last 14 of which were in Halifax County. As an active member of First Baptist Church in South Boston, she served as a deacon and taught Sunday school for many years. Boxley married Jane Stuart Brown, a sports events coordinator, in 1975.

== See also ==
- Llewellyn family name
