= Jakey Hollow Natural Area =

Natural area in Pennsylvania

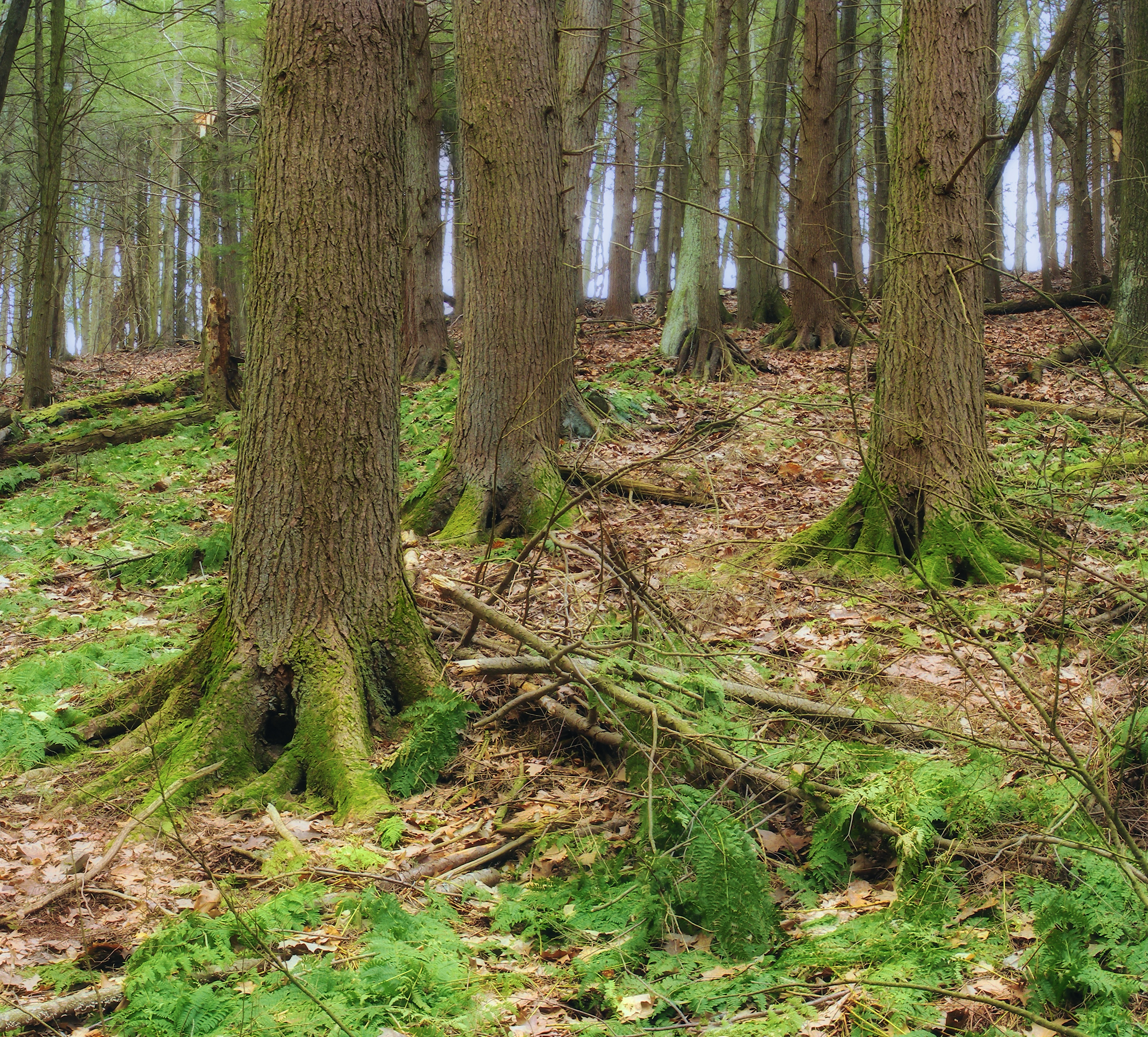
- Trees in Jakey Hollow Natural Area

- Location within Pennsylvania
- Location: Columbia County, Pennsylvania
- Nearest city: Bloomsburg
- Coordinates: 41°03′53″N 76°29′21″W
- Area: 59 acres (24 ha)
- Established: 1990

Jakey Hollow Natural Area is a protected area in Jakey Hollow in Columbia County, Pennsylvania, in the United States. The natural area has an area of 59 acres. A hiking trail known as the Ward Crawford Trail is in the area and hunting is also permitted there. Part of the natural area is old-growth forest and recognized by the Old-Growth Forest Network. Some logging was historically done in portions of Jakey Hollow. The area was purchased by Ward Crawford and his brother in the 1950s. They sold it to the Pennsylvania Department of Conservation and Natural Resources in 1990.

== Location and description ==
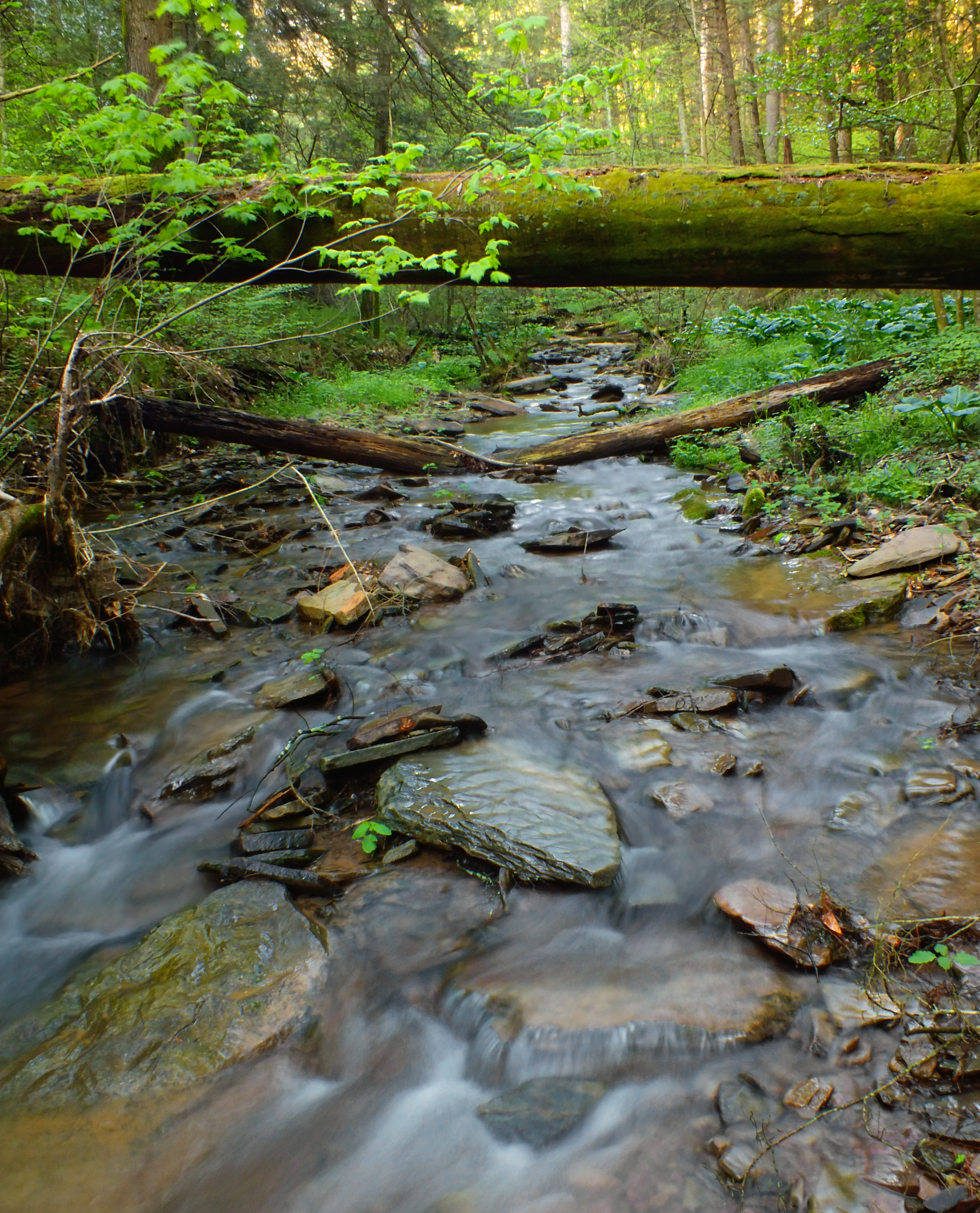
A stream in Jakey Hollow Natural Area

Jakey Hollow Natural Area is located in Hemlock Township, Madison Township, and Mount Pleasant Township, in Columbia County, Pennsylvania. A small portion of Jakey Hollow is in the northeastern corner of Hemlock Township and the southeastern corner of Madison Township. The vast majority of the hollow is in Mount Pleasant Township, which is also where the entirety of the natural area is located. With an area of 59 acres (24 ha), the natural area is one of the smallest natural areas in Pennsylvania.

Jakey Hollow Natural Area is located on a small tributary of Little Fishing Creek. It is near the community of Mordansville and 5 miles (8.0 km) north of Bloomsburg. A glen is also located in the natural area. The area is accessed via Crawford Road.

Two cornfields lie next to Jakey Hollow Natural Area and the area in the vicinity of it is being developed. Some of the woods surrounding the natural area is privately owned. Some timber is cut in these woods, but no logging has been done in the upper half of Jakey Hollow. Additionally, a stone quarry is found near the natural area. It is possible that in the future, it could become fully surrounded by developed land, specifically housing developments. Runoff from nearby agricultural lands is also found in the natural area.

== Biology ==
Jakey Hollow Natural Area is considered to be a Northern Conifer Forest Natural Community. Approximately half of the natural area is old-growth forest. The main tree species in the natural area are second-growth eastern hemlock, a small amount of virgin hemlock, and hardwood trees. Additionally, numerous other tree species inhabit the area. There are three oak species: chestnut oak, red oak, and white oak. Other tree species include American beech, black birch, black cherry, white pine, and white ash. The white pine population in the natural area consists of dozens of individuals, some of which more than 100 feet (30 m) high.

There is also a layer of herbs and shrubs in Jakey Hollow Natural Area. Three species of ferns inhabit the area, as do plants such as Virginia creeper, goldenrod, Indian cucumber, foamflower, skunk cabbage, and others. Clubmosses also inhabit the area in the summer. A number of bird species inhabit Jakey Hollow Natural Area. These include the cedar waxwing, the ovenbird, the barred owl, several species of thrushes and warblers, and others. A large population of bluejays also lives in Jakey Hollow. A number of invasive species inhabit Jakey Hollow Natural Area, including garlic mustard. Large populations of deer also over-browse in the area. A pest known as the hemlock wooly adelgid is found there as well.

== History ==
Jakey Hollow Natural Area was originally part of a larger forest that covered the region. The hardwood trees in the natural area are 200 years old. Historically, timbering was done in the hollow and former logging grades are still present.

In the 1950s, Ward Crawford and his brother purchased the land that Jakey Hollow Natural Area is on and protected it. The Pennsylvania Department of Conservation and Natural Resources purchased the land from Ward Crawford in 1990. It remains a protected area. In the 1990s, the natural area was part of the Wyoming State Forest.

== Recreation ==
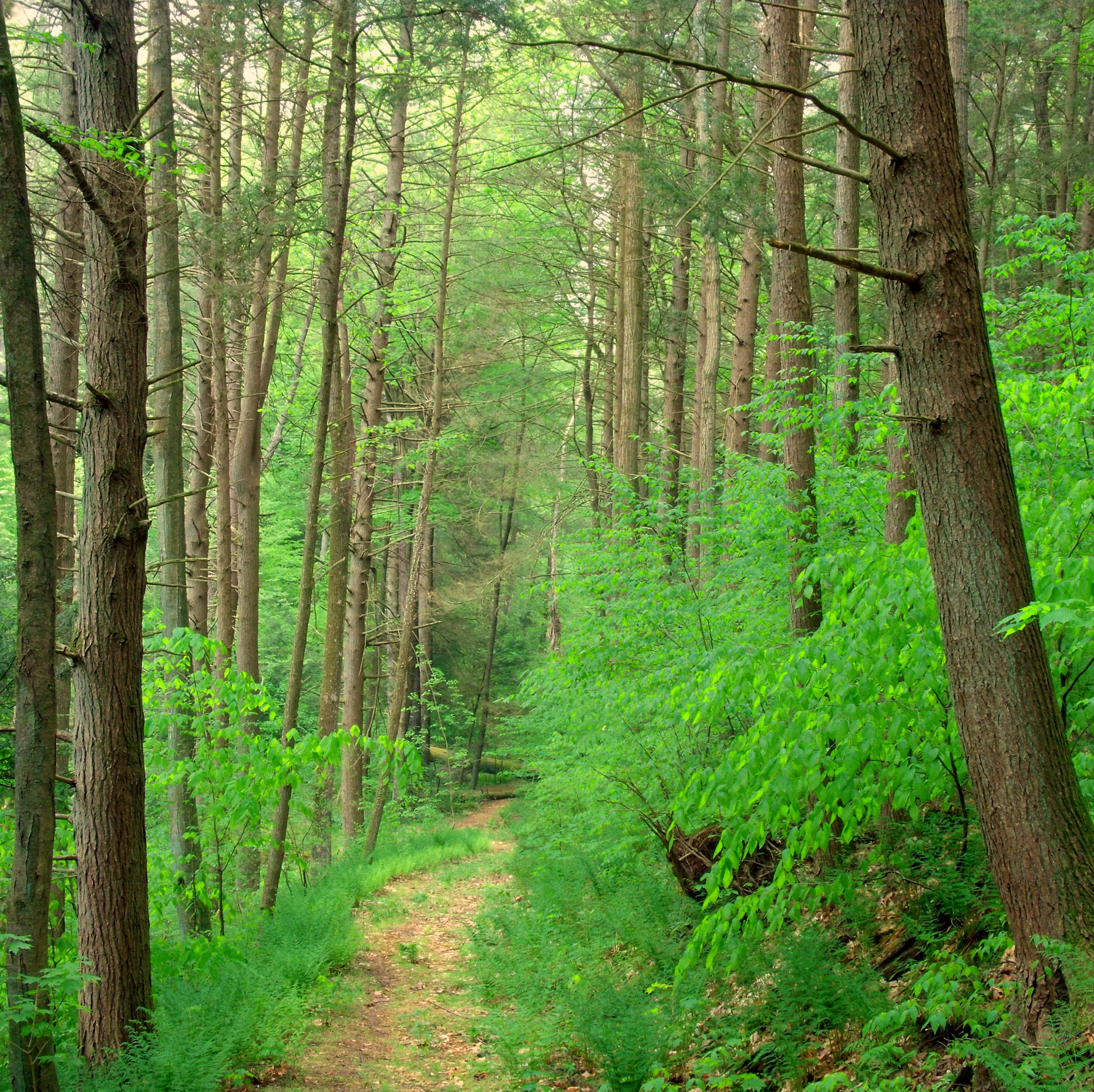
A walking trail in Jakey Hollow Natural Area

Hunting is permitted in Jakey Hollow Natural Area. The trail system of the natural area is not formal or well-established. However, there is an unblazed trail known as the Ward Crawford Trail. This trail starts at the parking lot for the natural area and climbs down into Jakey Hollow, where it crosses the stream at the bottom of the hollow and climbs up the other side, reaching a field. There are also footpaths that run parallel to the stream. The paths in the natural area were created by previous visitors.

The Ward Crawford Trail is 1 mile (1.6 km) long and takes one hour to complete. The elevation change is 100 feet (30 m). Jeff Mitchell describes the trail as easy in his book Hiking the Endless Mountains: Exploring the Wilderness of Northeastern Pennsylvania.

== See also ==
- Weiser State Forest
