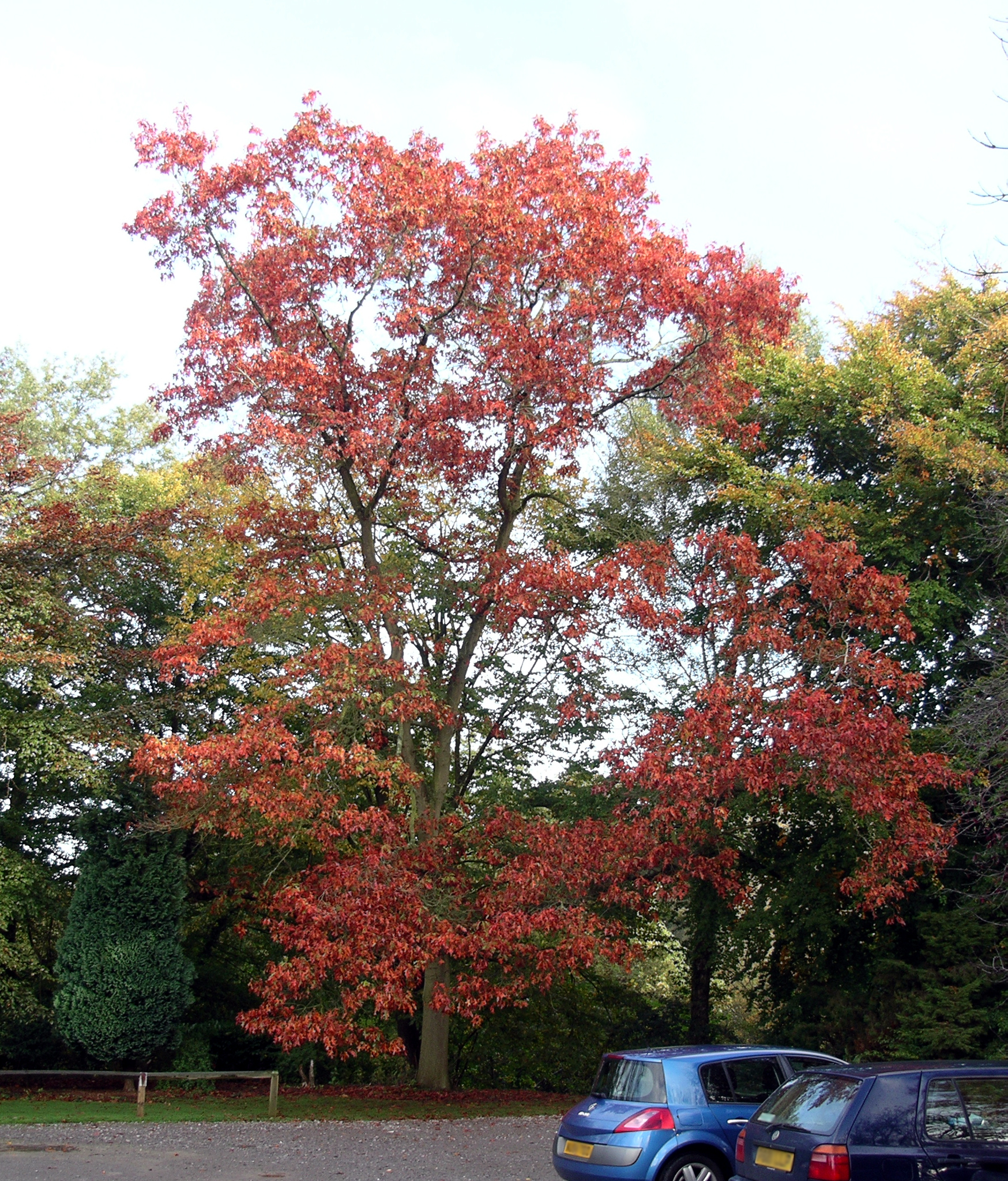
- Northern red oak in autumn

Conservation status
- Least Concern (IUCN 3.1)

- Secure (NatureServe)

Scientific classification
- Kingdom: Plantae
- Clade: Tracheophytes
- Clade: Angiosperms
- Clade: Eudicots
- Clade: Rosids
- Order: Fagales
- Family: Fagaceae
- Genus: Quercus
- Subgenus: Quercus subg. Quercus
- Section: Quercus sect. Lobatae
- Species: Q. rubra

Binomial name
- Quercus rubra L.
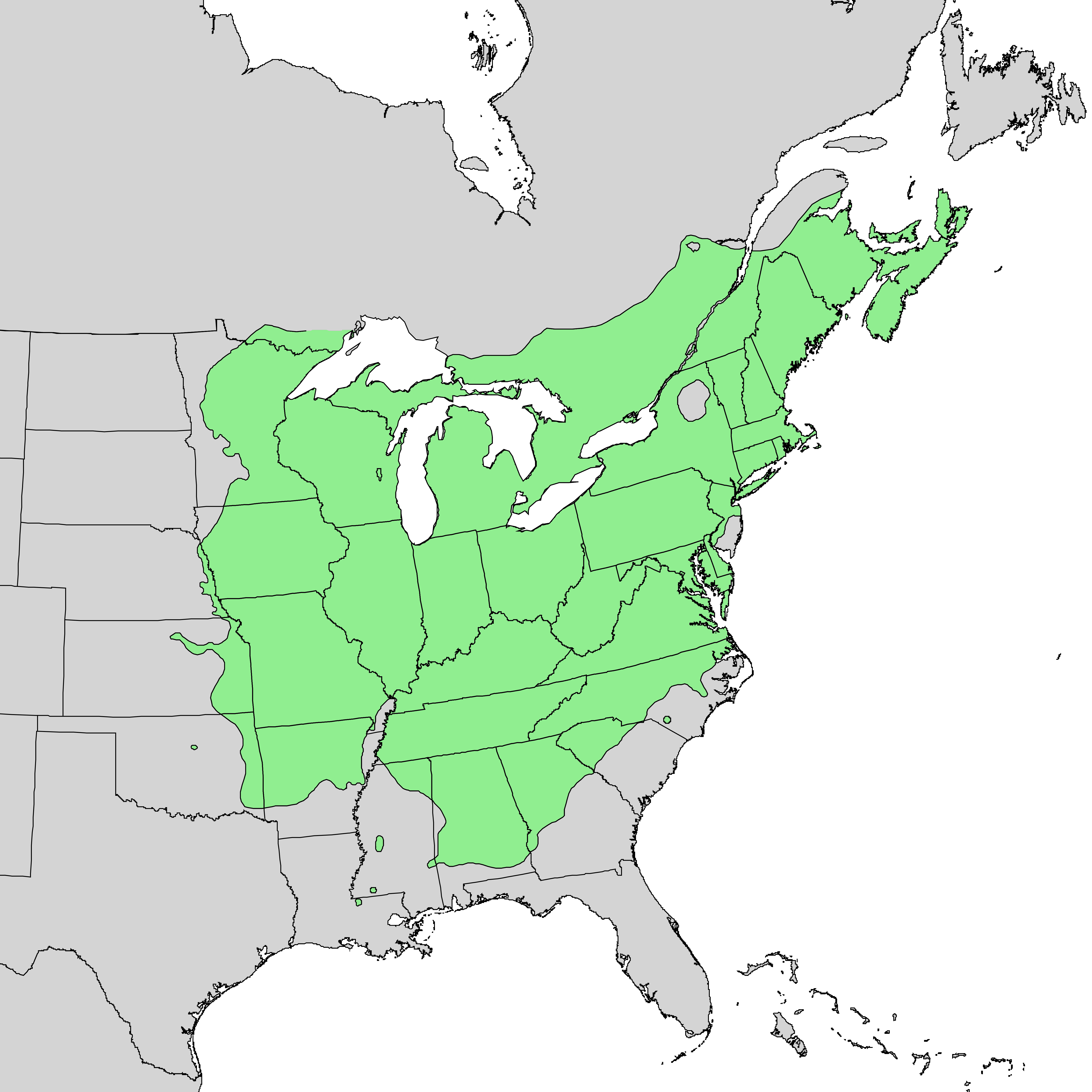

Synonyms
- Erythrobalanus rubra (L.) O.Schwarz; Quercus ambigua F.Michx.; Quercus angulizana Raf.; Quercus borealis F.Michx.; Quercus cuneata Dippel; Quercus maxima (Marshall) Ashe; Quercus sada Mast.

= Quercus rubra =

Species of flowering plant in the beech and oak family

Quercus rubra, the northern red oak or common red oak, is an oak tree in the red oak group (Quercus section Lobatae). It is a native of North America, in the eastern and central United States and southeast and south-central Canada. It has been introduced to small areas in Western Europe, where it can frequently be seen cultivated in gardens and parks. It prefers good soil that is slightly acidic. Often simply called red oak, northern red oak is so named to distinguish it from southern red oak (Q. falcata), also known as the Spanish oak.

== Description ==
In many forests, Quercus rubra grows straight and tall, to 28 metres (92 feet), exceptionally to 43 m (141 ft) tall, with a trunk of up to 50–100 centimetres (20–39 inches) in diameter. Open-grown trees do not get as tall, but can develop a stouter trunk, up to 2 m (6 1/2 ft) in diameter. It has stout branches growing at right angles to the stem, forming a narrow round-topped head.

Under optimal conditions and full sun, northern red oak is fast growing and a 10-year-old tree can be 5–6 m (16–20 ft) tall. Trees may live up to 400 years; a living example of 326 years was noted in 2001.

Northern red oak is easy to recognize by its bark, which features ridges that appear to have shiny stripes down the center. A few other oaks have bark with this kind of appearance in the upper tree, but the northern red oak is the only tree with the striping all the way down the trunk.

As with most other deciduous oaks, leafout takes place in spring when day length has reached 13 hours, tied entirely to the photoperiod regardless of air temperature. As a consequence (see below), in cooler regions, northern red oaks often lose their flowers to late spring frosts, resulting in no seed crop for the year. The catkins and leaves emerge at the same time. The acorns develop on the tree for two growing seasons and are released from the tree in early October, and leaf drop begins when day length falls under 11 hours. The timing of leafout and leaf drop can vary by as much as three weeks in the northern and southern US. Seedlings emerge in spring when soil temperatures reach 21 °C (70 °F).

- Bark: Dark reddish gray brown, with broad, thin, rounded ridges, scaly. On young trees and large stems, smooth and light gray. Rich in tannin. Branchlets slender, at first bright green, shining, then dark red, finally dark brown. Bark is brownish gray, becoming dark brown on old trees.
- Wood: Pale reddish brown, sapwood darker, heavy, hard, strong, coarse-grained. Cracks in drying, but when carefully treated could be successfully used for furniture. Also used in construction and for interior finish of houses. Sp. gr., 0.6621; weight of cu. ft., 41.25 lbs.
- Winter buds: Dark chestnut brown (reddish brown), ovate, acute, generally 6 mm (1/4 in) long
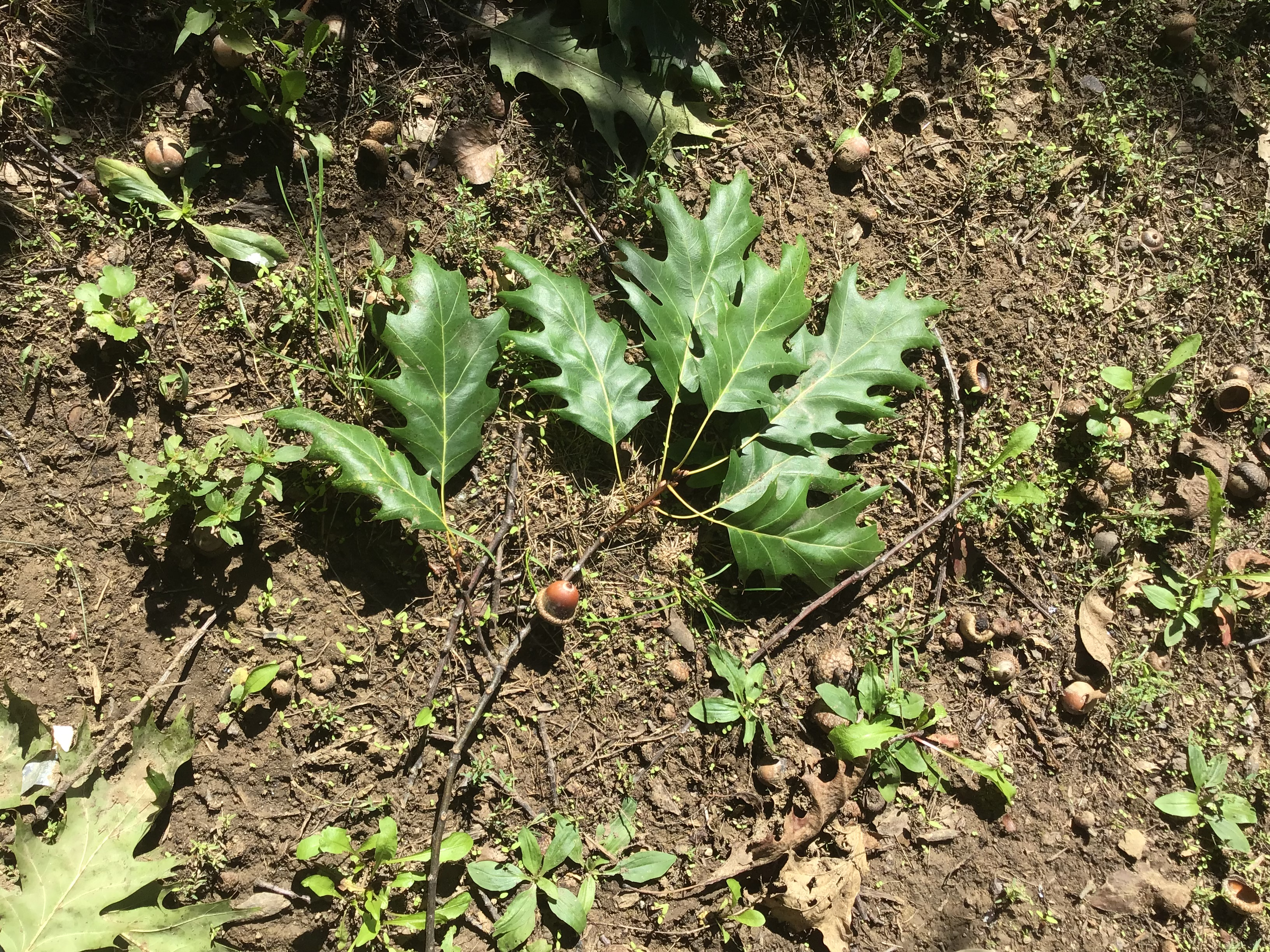
- Leaves and acorns
  Leaves and acorns: Alternate, oblong-ovate to oblong, five to ten inches long, four to six inches broad; seven to eleven lobes tapering gradually from broad bases, acute, and usually repandly dentate and terminating with long bristle-pointed teeth; the second pair of lobes from apex are largest; midrib and primary veins conspicuous. Lobes are often less deeply cut than most other oaks of the red oak group. Leaves emerge from the bud convolute, pink, covered with soft silky down above, coated with thick white tomentum below. When full grown are dark green and smooth, sometimes shining above, yellow green, smooth or hairy on the axils of the veins below. In autumn they turn a rich red, sometimes brown. Often the petiole and midvein are a rich red color in midsummer and early autumn, though this is not true of all red oaks. The acorns mature in about 18 months after pollination; solitary or in pairs, sessile or stalked; nut oblong-ovoid with broad flat base, full, with acute apex, one half to one and one-fourth of an inch long, first green, maturing nut-brown; cup, saucer-shaped and shallow, 2 cm (3/4 in) wide, usually covering only the base, sometimes one-fourth of the nut, thick, shallow, reddish brown, somewhat downy within, covered with thin imbricated reddish brown scales. Its kernel is white and very bitter.

Red oak acorns, unlike the white oak group, display epigeal dormancy and will not germinate without a minimum of three months' exposure to temperatures below 4 °C (40 °F). They also take two years of growing on the tree before development is completed.

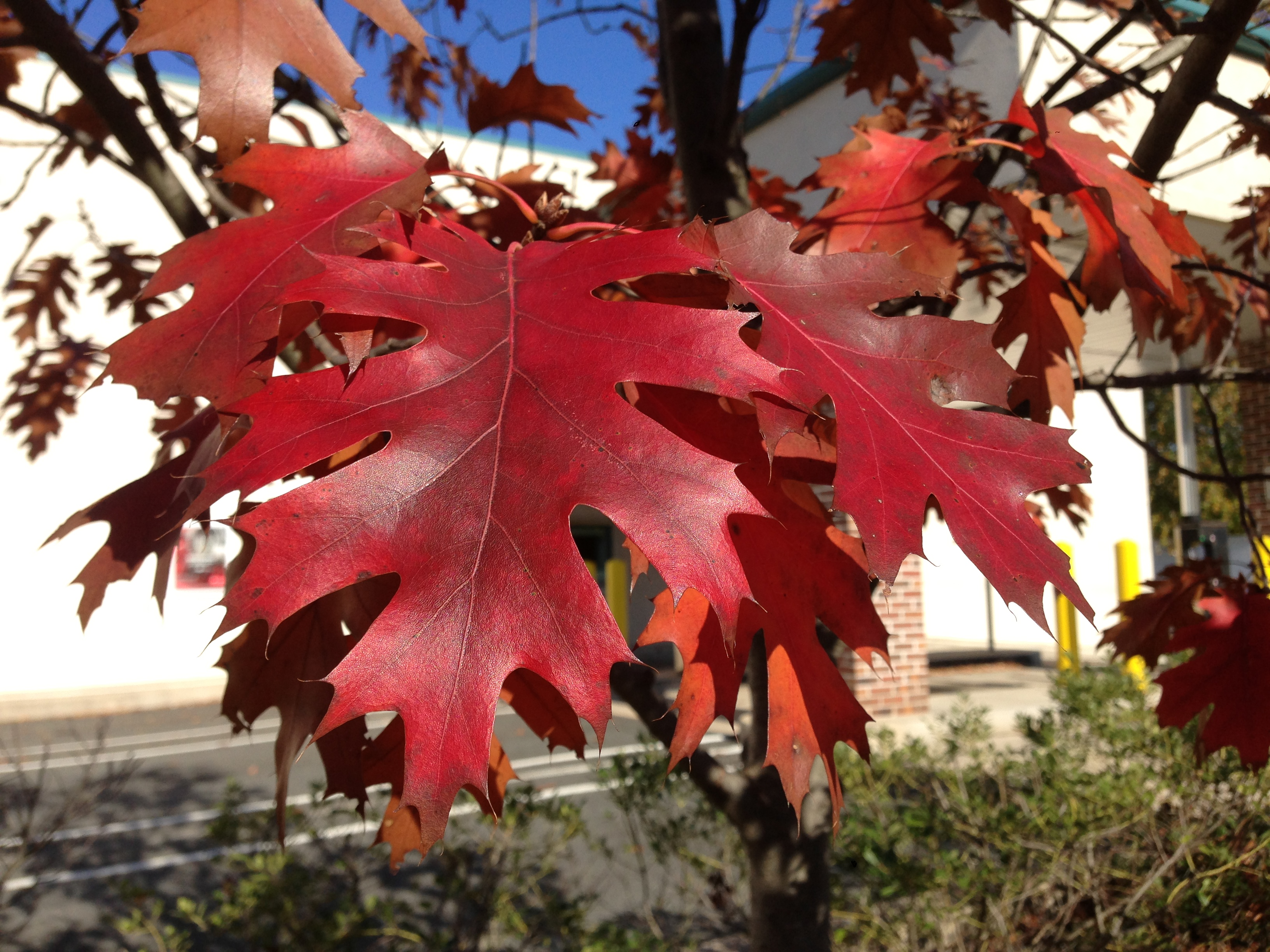
Autumn foliage

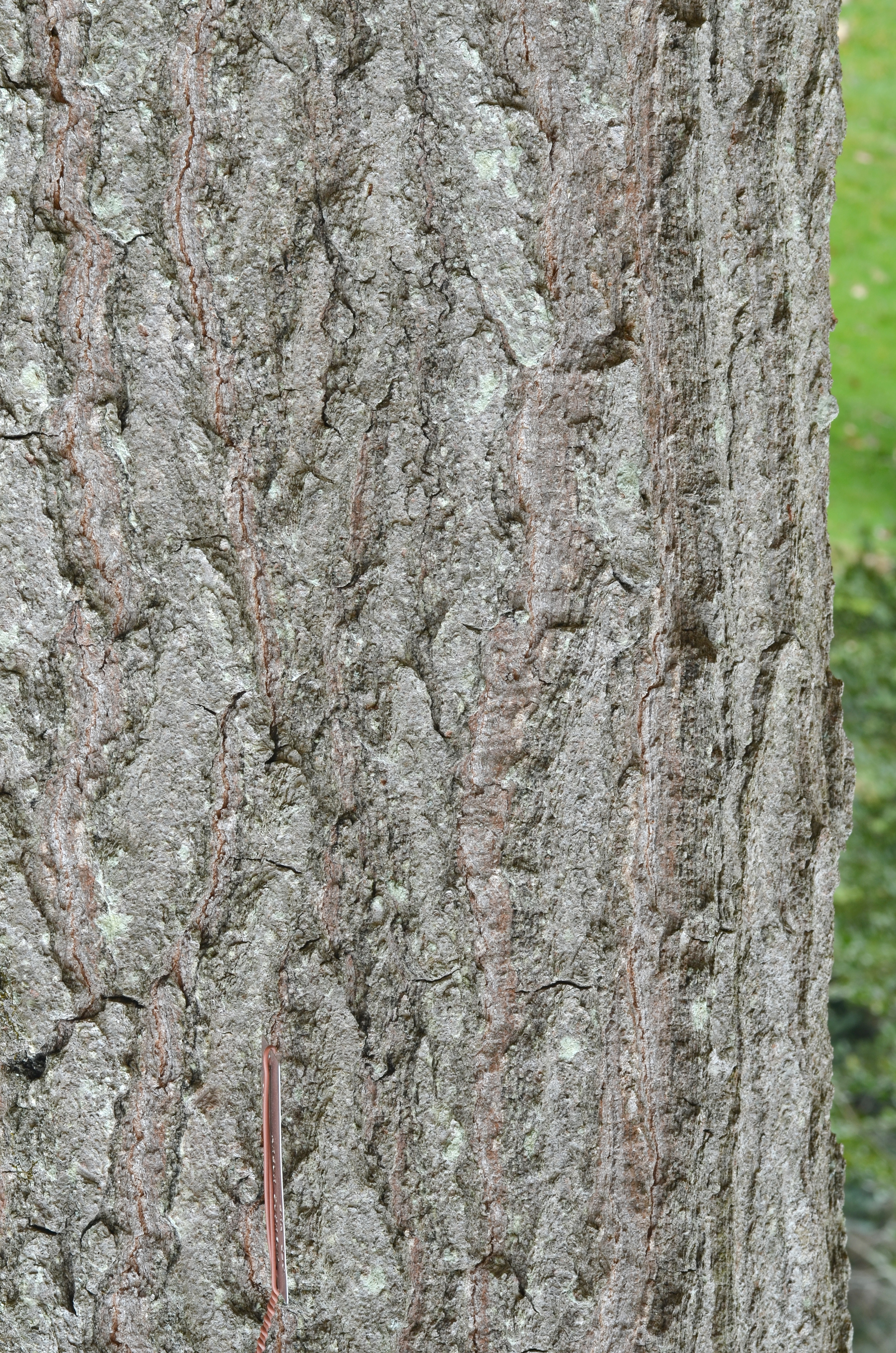
Detail of mature bark

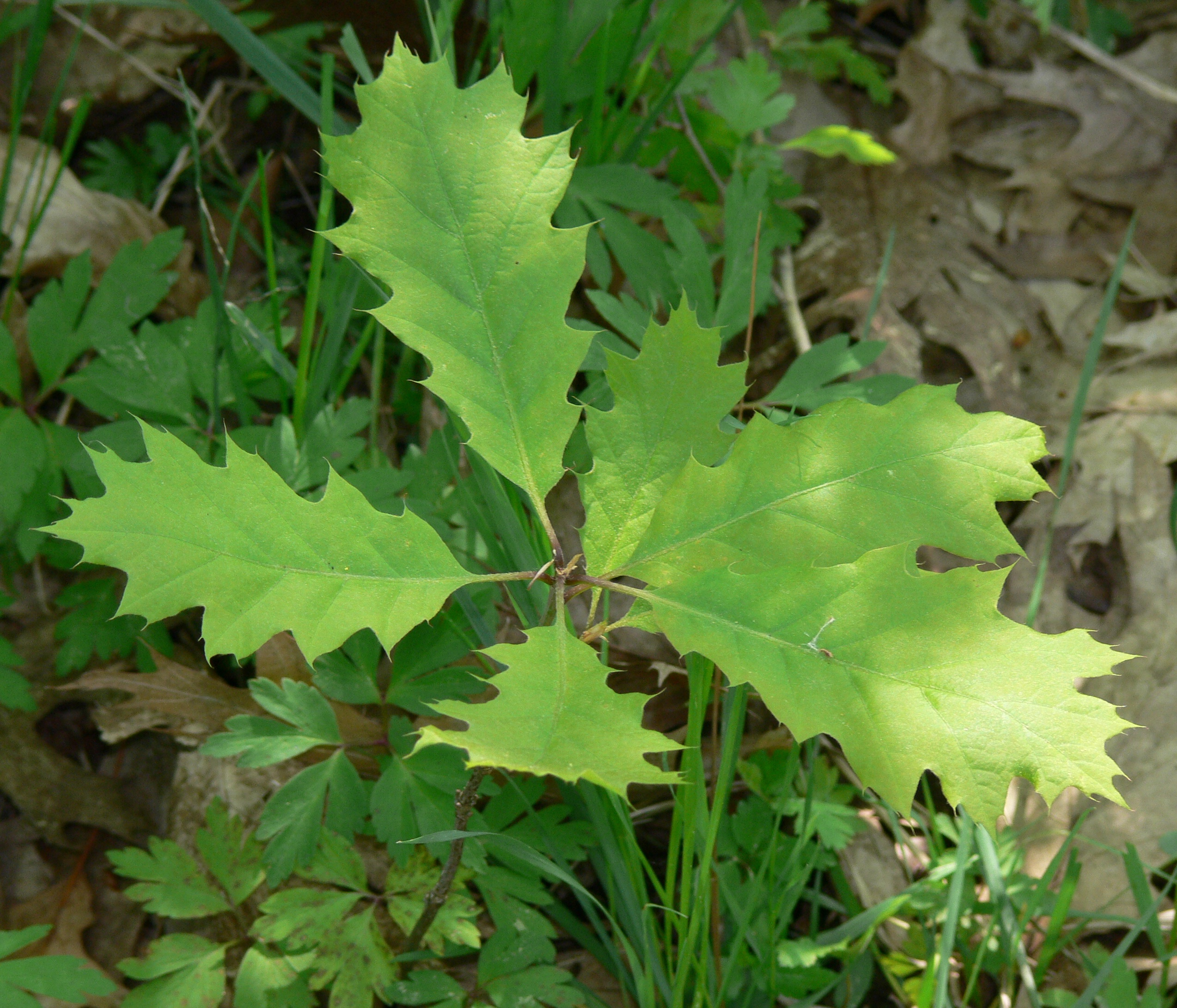
Sapling in Hohenlohe, Germany

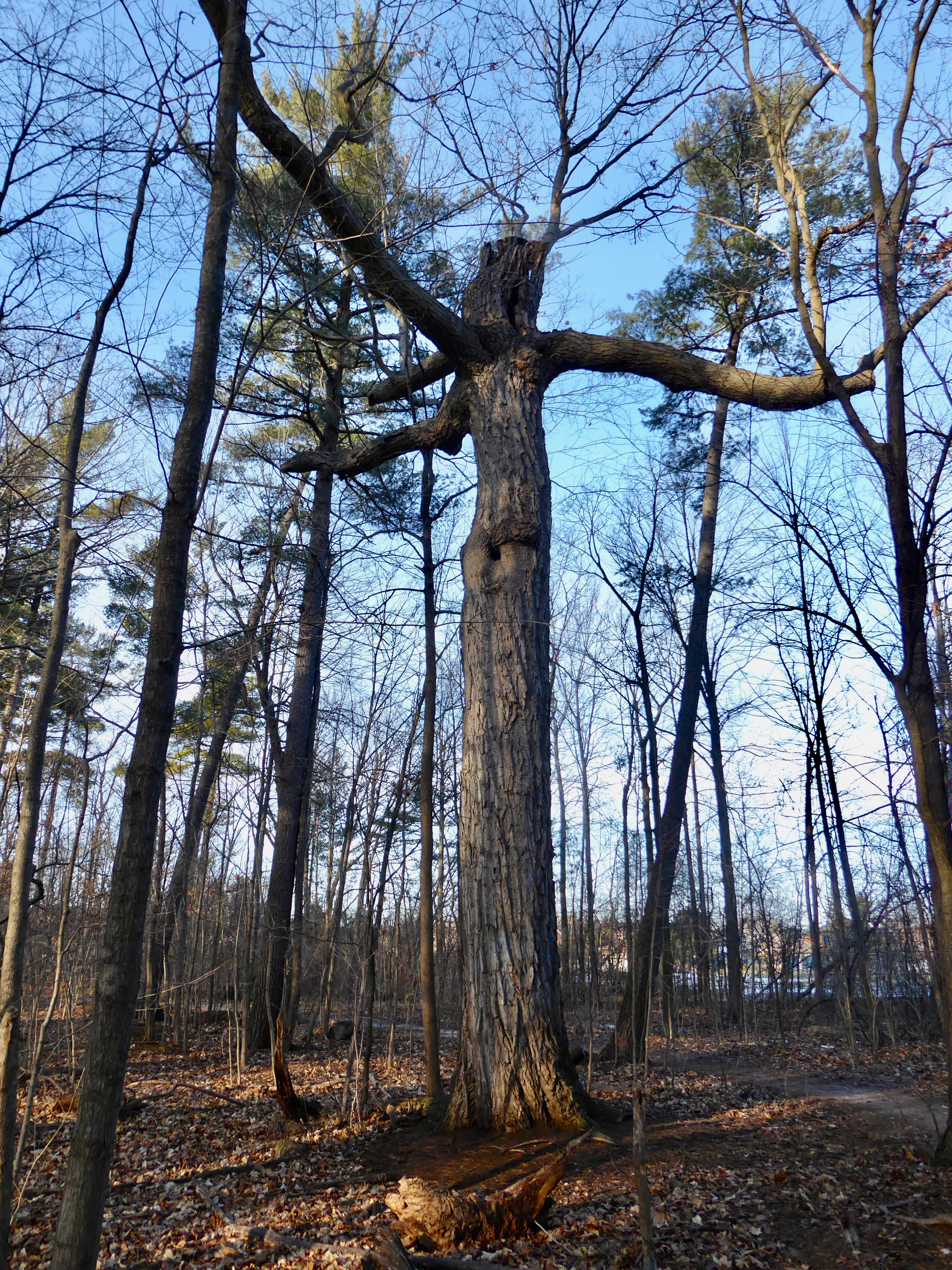
An old-growth northern red oak during winter in Glen Abbey, Oakville, Ontario

== Distribution and habitat ==
The species grows from the north end of the Great Lakes, east to Nova Scotia, south as far as Georgia, Mississippi, Alabama, and Louisiana, and west to Oklahoma, Kansas, Nebraska, and Minnesota.

It grows rapidly and is tolerant of many soils and varied situations, although it prefers the glacial drift and well-drained borders of streams. In the southeastern United States, it is frequently a part of the canopy in an oak-heath forest, but generally not as important as some other oaks.

Northern red oak is the most common species of oak in the northeastern US after the closely related pin oak (Q. palustris). The red oak group as a whole are more abundant today than they were when European settlement of North America began as forest clearing and exploitation for lumber much reduced the population of the formerly dominant white oaks.

== Reproduction ==
"Northern red oak (Quercus rubra L.) is monoecious, dichogamous, wind-pollinated, and self-incompatible". Pollination occurs in the first growing season, but fertilization and acorn maturation occur during the second growing season.

== Ecology ==
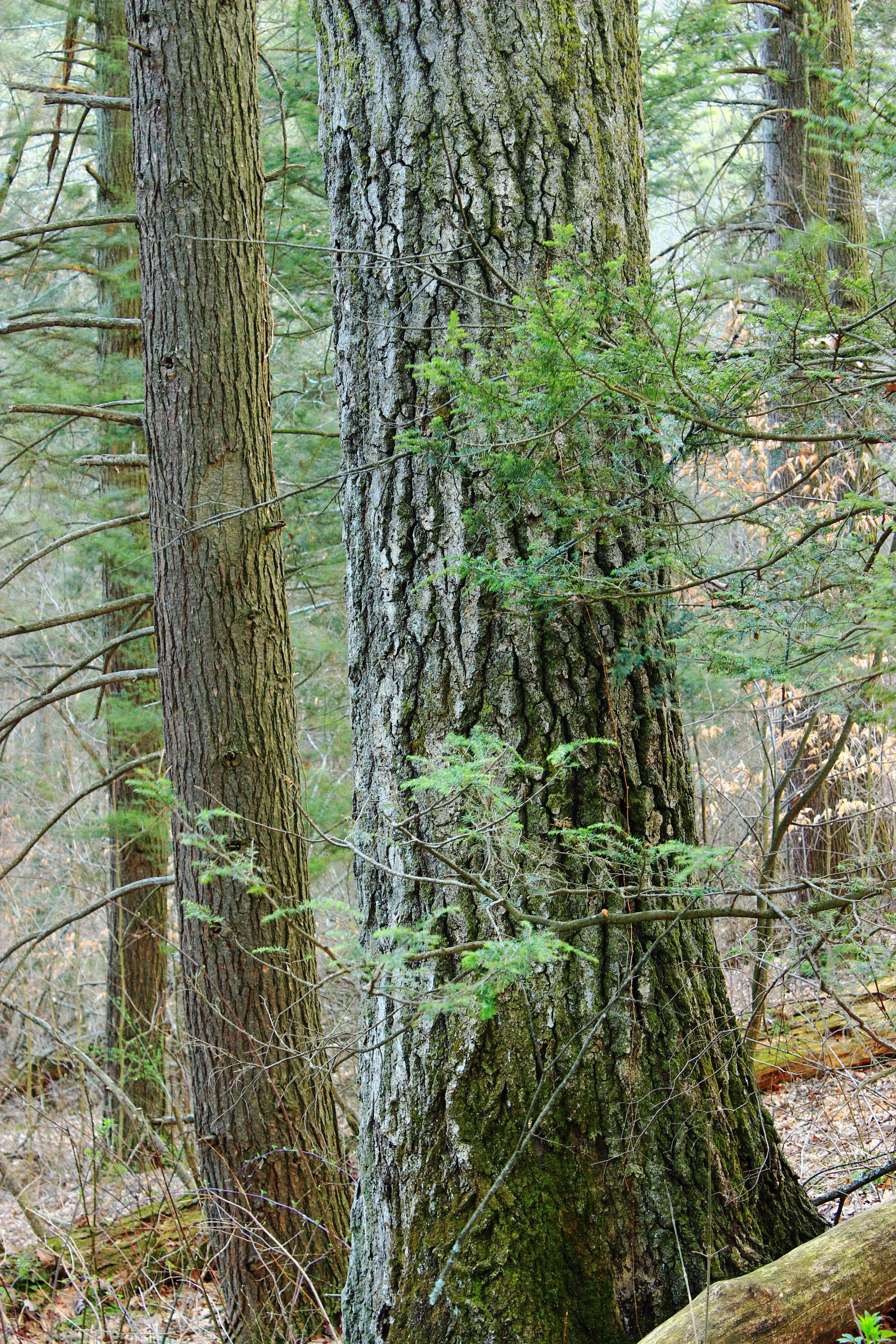
Mossy trunk of a large, old-growth individual surrounded by hemlocks within the Jakey Hollow Natural Area of Weiser State Forest in Columbia County, Pennsylvania

Over the last few decades, the northern red oak has dealt with several environmental factors, mainly disease, predation by insects, and limited opportunities for dispersal. These stresses have impacted the species' ability to proliferate in both the Northeast and Europe. The various environmental responses observed in Quercus rubra across several temperate environmental conditions have allowed for it to serve as a model organism for studying symbiotic relationships, dispersal, and habituation between tree species.

=== Pests and diseases ===
Canker pathogen, Diplodia corticola, has become a major pathogen to the species over the last decade, causing leaf browning, bark cracking and bleeding, and high rates of tree mortality across the northeastern United States. The northern red oak is also characterized as one of the most susceptible species to plant fungi Phytophthora cinnamomi and Phytophthora ramorum, which have caused severe, red-black cankers in the trunk region of the species. Both P. cinnamomi and P. ramorum grow under warmer temperature conditions; as a result, northern red oak trees found in California, France, and northern Spain all have a higher incidence of fungal infection. Oak Wilt caused by the fungus Bretziella fagacearum is a major pathogen found in eastern North America that can kill trees quickly.

There has been a recent northern red oak decline in Arkansas which is "unique in that it is associated with increases in red oak borer" (Enaphalodes rufulus) which "is native to the eastern United States and usually occurs in mixed oak forests". "It damages the phloem, sapwood, and heartwood which means the ability for growth and repair is attacked as well as the stability of the tree". Spongy moths (Lymantria dispar) have been noted to preferentially target northern red oak

=== Abiotic stresses ===
Northern red oak seedlings have been known to have a high mortality rate in northeast regions prone to spring freeze, particularly in Massachusetts. Acorns produced by oaks in this region are typically smaller in size as an adaptation to frost produced in high latitudes; however, the resulting smaller seedlings have produced limited opportunities for animal consumption and dispersal. Flooding along the continental United States has been shown to be a major issue for the northern red oak, in which decreased phloem transport and photosynthetic activity has been observed, but only after multiple days of flooding, indicating that the northern red oak has adapted moderate resistance to excess water exposure. The northern red oak has also developed tolerance mechanisms for heat stress, particularly observed in deciduous forests in the Southeastern United States, where, during summer heat waves, temperatures can exceed 40 °C (104 °F). The leaves of the northern red oak have been observed to have an acclimation to Rubisco activase activity that is directly correlated to acclimations with repeated exposure to heat waves. Consistent photosynthetic activity in the red oak has also been observed in the presence of high carbon dioxide levels that often occur as a result of elevated temperatures.

=== Animals ===
Northern red oak kernels have highly concentrated amounts of bitter-tasting tannin, a biochemical classified as a predator deterrent, which has limited appeal for consumption among animals. Despite this, the acorns are eaten by deer, squirrels and birds. In Europe, the acorns are consumed by several moth species, particularly Cydia fagiglandana and Cydia splendana, which increases their niche breadths and reduces their competition with Curculio weevils. Due to this, germination rates among the northern red oak acorns have decreased significantly and resulted in less seed dispersal by animals within Poland. In addition, limited opportunities for dispersal have become costly for the northern red oak in Europe. European animals known for dispersing tendencies, such as the European jay and wood mouse, have been found to be more attracted to local oak species.

=== Fungi ===
Quercus rubra has effective ectomycorrhizal relationships that have been correlated with increased growth rates. Northern red oak trees have been shown to increase growth in the presence of various ascomycetes that coil at the base of the oak trunk. The fungi, which eventually proliferate at the stumps of deciduous trees, have been found to be host-specific to both Quercus rubra and Quercus montana and primarily promote growth upon infection.

=== Invasiveness in Europe ===
It was introduced to Europe in the 1700s and has naturalized throughout most of western and central Europe. Across western and central Europe, the northern red oak has become the fourth-most significant invasive species, colonizing several regions across Belgium, Germany, Northern Italy, Lithuania, Poland, Ukraine, European Russia, the Urals and Western Siberia. The northern red oak is primarily found on the edges of woodland reserves in Europe, where light availability, tannin concentration, and animal dispersal are the most necessary component for the species' longevity and survival. The high influx of the species in Europe is primarily based on its economic productivity as a fast-growing source of timber; however, it has been linked to lower percentages of trace elements and minerals found in the surrounding soil and reduced richness among native oak species such as Quercus robur.

== Cultivation and uses ==
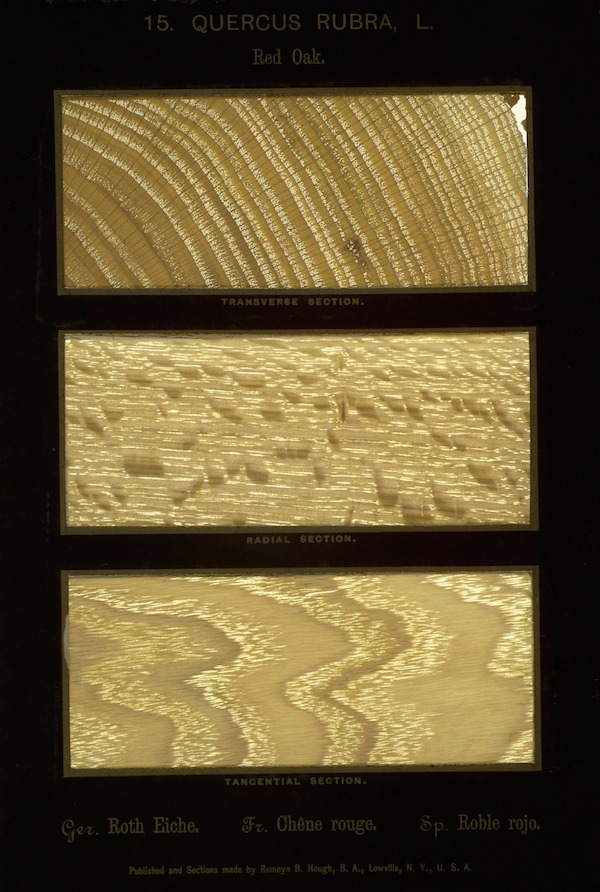
Wood, from Romeyn Beck Hough's fourteen-volume work The American Woods

The northern red oak is one of the most important oaks for timber production in North America. Quality red oak is of high value as lumber and veneer, while defective logs are used as firewood. Other related oaks are also cut and marketed as red oak, although their wood is not always of as high a quality. These include eastern black oak, scarlet oak, pin oak, Shumard oak, southern red oak and other species in the red oak group. Construction uses include flooring, veneer, interior trim, and furniture. It is also used for lumber, railroad ties, and fence posts.

Red oak wood grain is so open that smoke can be blown through it from end-grain to end-grain on a flat-sawn board. For this reason, it is subject to moisture infiltration and is unsuitable for outdoor uses such as boatbuilding or exterior trim.

The acorns can be collected in autumn, shelled, tied up in a cloth, and leached to remove bitterness. They can then be eaten whole or ground into meal.

=== Ornamental use ===
Quercus rubra is grown in parks and large gardens as a specimen tree. It is not planted as often as the closely related pin oak as it develops a taproot and quickly becomes difficult to transplant, however modern growing pots have made starting seedlings with taproots easier than in the past.

== Culture ==
It is the state tree of New Jersey and the provincial tree of Prince Edward Island.

=== Famous specimens ===
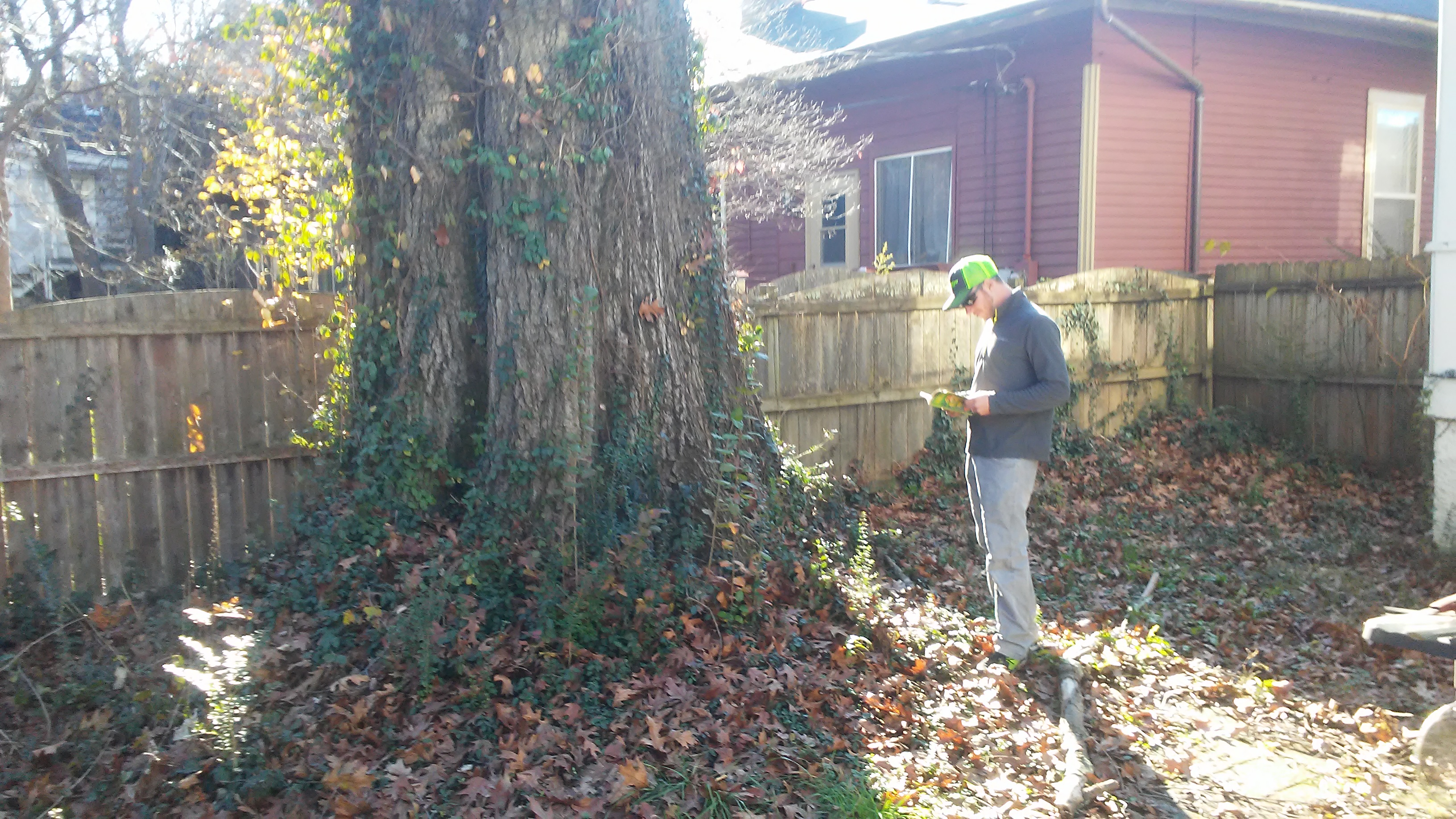
The Shera-Blair red oak

- Ashford Oak – A very large Northern Red Oak in Ashford, Connecticut. The tree has suffered falling limbs because of its great age. However, this tree is still a sight to behold; the trunk is 8 m (26 ft) in circumference and the root-knees are also particularly impressive. The oak is located on Giant Oak Lane off U.S. Highway 44. There are several other large oaks in the area.
- Chase Creek Red Oak – This forest tree is located on a very rich steep slope in Anne Arundel County, Maryland. It is a high-stump coppice with three leads. It was the state champion oak in Maryland in 2002. The circumference at breast height is 6.7 m (22 ft 0 in), the height 41.5 m (136 ft 2 in) and the spread 29.9 m (98 ft 1 in)
- Shera-Blair Red Oak – This majestic red oak tree is located on Shelby Street in the South Frankfort neighborhood in Franklin County, Kentucky, and is the largest red oak tree in the oldest neighborhood in Frankfort, Kentucky. It is in the backyard of a house built in 1914 by architect Arthur Raymond Smith, who at one time worked for D.X. Murphy & Bros., famed architects that designed the twin spires at Churchill Downs. The circumference at breast height is 6.4 m (21 ft 0 in), with the trunk reaching higher than 12 m (40 ft) before the branches begin and an estimated height of 40 m (130 ft).
- Zhelevo – At over 250 years old, this tree is among the oldest in Toronto. The trunk has a circumference of 4.95 m (16 ft 3 in) and the canopy is over 24 m (79 ft) tall. The lot where the tree stands has been purchased by the City of Toronto to be turned into a public park.
- International Tree of Peace – On 21 June 2019 an International Tree of Peace was planted on the north lawn of the National WWI Museum and Memorial in Kansas City, Missouri. It was planted in the honor and memory of those who fought and died in World War I.
