= Joan Maloof =

Founder of the Old-Growth Forest Network

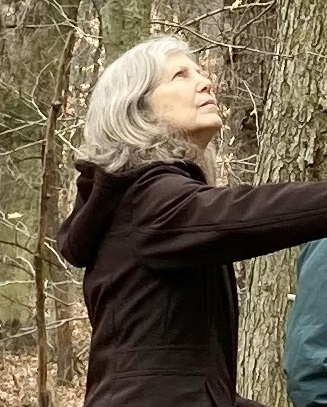
Joan Maloof in 2022

Joan Maloof (born 1956 or 1957) is an American environmental activist and author. She founded the Old-Growth Forest Network in 2012.

Maloof was raised in Delaware. Her father was a chemical engineer. She is the author of five books. Her first, Teaching the Trees, was published in 2005, and her second, Among the Ancients, in 2011. Nature's Temples followed in 2016, with a revised edition released in 2023. In 2017, Maloof published The Living Forest with photographer Robert Llewellyn. Her latest book, Treepedia, was published by Princeton University Press in 2021.

She is a professor emerita at Salisbury University.

== Books ==
- Treepedia: A Brief Compendium of Arboreal Lore.
- Nature's Temples: A Natural History of Old-Growth Forests Revised and Expanded.
- The Living Forest: A Visual Journey Into the Heart of the Woods.
- Nature's Temples: The Complex World of Old-Growth Forests.
- Teaching the Trees: Lessons from the Forest.
