= Old-Growth Forest Network =

American non-profit organization

The Old-Growth Forest Network is an American 501(c)(3) non-profit organization whose mission is to protect old-growth forests from logging by identifying them throughout the United States.

== Purpose ==
The Old-Growth Forest Network's vision is a national network of forests where people are able to experience the beauty and integrity of nature. To achieve its vision, the organization strives to create a network of forests across the U.S.—with one in each county—that are not logged and are open to visitors. In the Eastern United States, more than 99 percent of old-growth forests have been cleared for agricultural or developmental purposes, or have been replaced by second-growth forests. The organization's goal is to ensure that some forests are set aside and protected, allowing them to recover their old-growth characteristics. These "future old-growth forests" will provide opportunities for future generations across the country to experience native forests in their mature diversity and complexity.

== History ==
The Old-Growth Forest Network was founded by Joan Maloof, Salisbury University, Maryland, now Executive Director of the organization. She spends her time lecturing, writing, visiting forests, assisting private landowners, and supporting local groups trying to protect community forests from development. The work of the Old-Growth Forest Network is also supported by staff and volunteers, including County Coordinators who act as liaisons to the managers of the dedicated forests in the network.

Maloof began as a scientist studying the natural workings of the planet—the systems that enable the trees and flowers and animals to subsist on their own with no help from humans. When she looked for natural places to study, she found that almost everything had been affected by humans. She also became aware that the oldest forests—some of the most natural and biologically diverse places on earth—were being logged and converted into managed forests—monoculture tree farms. Maloof was not opposed to harvesting trees for board and fiber, but as an ecologist, she knew that sacrificing biodiversity came hand in hand with not only sacrificing beauty but also toppling the network that keeps the balance of the planet.

Maloof realized that as a scientist she could do little to ensure that at least some of the forests would be left alone, but that as a writer she could share what other scientists had learned about the importance of ancient forests. She wrote Teaching the Trees: Lessons from the Forest. The first chapter describes a visit to an eastern old-growth forest, a forest that had never been logged. Her readers, few of whom had ever witnessed an old-growth forest, wanted to know how they could visit one. There were a few left, but very little information existed about how to find them. That led to a second book: Among the Ancients: Adventures in the Eastern Old-Growth Forests, reflections on one old forest in each of the twenty-six Eastern states—with directions. Maloof went on to author two more books: Nature's Temples: The Complex World of Old-Growth Forests, and The Living Forest: A Visual Journey Into the Heart of the Woods, a coffee-table book featuring the photography of Robert Llewellyn.

In her journeys to these forests, and through the forestry literature, Maloof learned that very few original forests have not been logged or otherwise disturbed—less than 1% remains in the East, and 5% in the West. Thus began Maloof's transition from writer to founder of an organization that would identify and help protect one forest in each county of the US where forests could grow and let people know where they were located. Her plan was to help stop the destruction of what old-growth remained, help some forests recover, and enable more Americans to experience an old forest.

In 2011 she left her university position and started working full-time to establish the Old-Growth Forest Network. With the help of her board, Maloof started building the network and educating others about it. In that first year, twenty forests were formally added to the Network and 600 supporters signed up. Maloof gave twenty-three lectures—including talks at Longwood Gardens, the US Botanical Garden, Cornell University and Penn State University.

As of July 15, 2021, the Network had 138 inductees in 25 states, toward the goal of having at least one forest in every county in the United States that can sustain a forest—estimated to be 2,370 counties. As of March, 2025 the Network had 276 inductee forests in 39 states.

== Organizational strategy ==
For the network to be within reach of all Americans, the organization intends to identify one forest that will be left forever wild within each county where forests naturally grow. Of the 3,140 counties in the US, it is estimated that about 75%, or 2,370 will support forests. Many of these counties already contain public forests so only a single one would need to be chosen and officially recognized as part of the network. In many counties it will be already protected Federal land which becomes recognized in the network, such as a National Forest or Fish and Wildlife land. In other places, it may be a State Forest that is recognized. In some counties that have no State or Federal lands, the county or city itself may have some property that could become part of the network. The next level of landowners to be considered for voluntarily joining the network are likely to be nonprofit organizations such as land trusts or The Nature Conservancy. In the less common situations where there are no public lands and no nonprofit organization lands which can be included in the network, a county may appeal to a private donor or apply for federal grant funds, perhaps with the assistance of an organization such as The Conservation Fund.

The Old-Growth Forest Network's strategy is to identify candidate forests, ensure that they are publicly accessible and protected forever from logging, and recognize them as part of the network. Once dedicated, the forests are listed and publicized on the network's website. The organization believes that building the Network in this way will take very little financial investment, and that the preservation of over two thousand undisturbed, accessible forests will have a positive effect on both the humans and the wildlife in the U.S.

== Community forests and private landowners ==
Local activists contact the Old-Growth Forest Network to help protect community forests threatened with development. The organization advocates for forest preservation and assists local protection efforts where possible. Community forests that may not be as large, ecologically diverse, or as stringently protected can be inducted into the Old-Growth Forest Network's Community Forest program.

Many of the oldest forests in the United States are privately owned. The organization advises private landowners about their forests and helps them realize their preservation goals. Private forest owners who commit to protecting their land in perpetuity through mechanisms such as a "Forever Wild" conservation easement (meaning it will never be logged) may also receive recognition by the Old-Growth Forest Network's Private Forest designation.
