= Bill W. Spiller =

American broadcasting pioneer

Billy Wade "Bill" Spiller (4 June 1926 – 23 September 2004) was a public broadcasting pioneer in Virginia, United States.

== Biography ==
A native of Tulia, Texas, Spiller was working as an engineer for KATC-TV, the ABC station in Lafayette, Louisiana, when in 1963, he was recruited to become the first general manager of WCVE-TV (Channel 23) and Central Virginia Educational Telecommunications Corporation in Richmond, Virginia. The company became Commonwealth Public Broadcasting Company.

Beginning in January 1964, he worked to construct and establish the new public television station. WCVE-TV first went on the air September 14, 1964, and in the 27 years that followed, Spiller spearheaded the establishment of three additional public television stations in central and Northern Virginia, saved a financially troubled station, and stepped in to prevent public radio from disappearing from Richmond.

The community-owned public broadcasting company was established in 1961 by Thomas Boushall and a group of concerned citizens to employ television for educational purposes. The patron saints of public broadcasting in central Virginia were Spiller, Boushall, E. Claiborne Robins Sr. and Mary Ann Franklin. Mrs. Franklin first approached Boushall and Henry I. Willett, then Superintendent of Richmond City Schools, with the idea of establishing an educational television station. Boushall and Franklin then recruited Spiller, who was hired in December 1963 and began working for them in January 1964, three years before the establishment of the Public Broadcasting Service (PBS), of which WCVE-TV became a charter member.

WCVE's sister station, WCVW (channel 57) signed on in 1967 after Spiller successfully petitioned the FCC to grant a license for a second public television station. Richmond became the first community in Virginia to have dual public television stations, and only the eighth in the nation to do so.

In 1974, Commonwealth Public Broadcasting took over WNVT, a Fairfax public TV station on the verge of financial insolvency, to support the continuation of Northern Virginia-based educational programming. In 1981, Spiller oversaw the establishment of a second Northern Virginia station, WNVC, primarily serving the international community in the Washington area by rebroadcasting non-English language news and public interest programming. Those stations continue to operate today as MHz Networks, and are still owned by CPB.

When Union Theological Seminary announced its plans to give up its public radio license for WRFK, Spiller ensured that public radio would remain alive and well in Richmond and in 1988, WCVE-FM radio went on the air. The following year, under Spiller's leadership, the company established a Charlottesville public television station under call sign WHTJ; that station became a translator for WCVE.

Spiller's final contribution to the growth and development of public broadcasting in central Virginia occurred just before his retirement, with the addition of a 25,000 square feet (2,300 m^{2}) TV and radio studio-office complex at 23 Sesame Street in Bon Air in 1991.

He died on 23 September 2004.
