= Terri Allard =

American singer (born 1962)

- Born: Theresa Ann Allard; August 31, 1962 (age 63)
- Origin: Barboursville, Virginia
- Genres: folk, country
- Occupation(s): singer-songwriter, musician
- Instrument: guitar
- Website: terriallard.com (defunct)

Theresa Ann "Terri" Allard is an American country and folk singer-songwriter from Barboursville, Virginia. She was born on August 31, 1962. Her album, Makes No Sense, features a song she wrote with Mary Chapin Carpenter.

Allard was the host of Charlottesville Inside-Out, a television talk show on PBS station WHTJ. In 2017, she celebrated a decade with the show. The show concluded in 2020 after 13 seasons.

== Early life and education ==
Allard attended Orange County High School in Orange, Virginia. While there, she was a long distance runner and set record times in the one-mile and two-mile distances in 1980.

Phil Audibert, a local author and musician, gave Allard her first guitar lesson. As a fourth-grader, she sang "Leaving on a Jet Plane" at a 4-H talent contest, accompanied on the guitar by Extension agent, Ted Carroll.

Her early contest recognition led to the Lion's Club Bland Music Contest and then folk concerts at the Four County Players theater in Barboursville. She and Mark Brookman, a Gordonsville, Virginia, native, began playing as a musical duo.

After finishing college, Allard pursued her music. For a few years, she performed weekly at Random Row, a bar in Charlottesville. During this time, she built a repertoire of original material and developed a fan base.

Billy Marshall Brockman, a fellow Orange County native, gave Allard the push she needed to launch her music career properly.

== Career ==
While playing at a club in Harrisonburg, Virginia, Allard and Brockman discussed music with a bartender named Dwayne. Allard and Dwayne were married soon after.

Her new husband had a degree in marketing, and they produced her first CD in 1994, with four more to follow — "all of them released under the independent label she and Dwayne started."

Allard and her husband invested their money in travel, press packets, and marketing. As she recalls:

You drive to Nashville, you drive eight hours, nine hours to play three songs at the Bluebird, and no one's paying you anything. You do that sort of thing a lot.

Allard formed the Terri Allard Jazz Quartet with some area musicians, including drummer Robert Jospé, pianist Bob Hallahan, and bassists Pete Spaar. The group performs popular jazz standards with favorites including those by Ella Fitzgerald, Sarah Vaughan, and Etta James.

== Reception and awards ==
No losers here. Allard's mastered the art of the Americana ballad...she wraps up her emotions in truly attractive acoustic melodies. Allard's most potent weapon is her voice, a sultry combination of sweetness and grit.

— Bill Craig, Richmond Times-Dispatch

- "Best of CVille" songwriter winner
- WAMMIE (Washington Area Music Award) for Best Female Country Vocalist

== Discography ==
- Terri Allard (1994)
- Rough Lines (1996)
- Loose Change and Spare Parts (1999)
- Makes No Sense (2002)
- Live From Charlottesville (2006)

== Personal ==
Allard's father, Bill, is also a musician. Her brother, Scott A. Allard, was a professional actor. He died in 2005, of melanoma. Her son, Will, has performed with her band from a very young age.
