= WCVE-TV =

Television station in Richmond, Virginia

WCVE-TV and WHTJ

WCVE-TV: Richmond, Virginia; WHTJ: Charlottesville, Virginia; United States
- Channels for WCVE-TV: Digital: 22 (UHF), shared with WNVT; Virtual: 23
- Channels for WHTJ: Digital: 26 (UHF), shared with WNVC; Virtual: 41
- Branding: VPM PBS

Programming
- Affiliations: 23.1/41.1: PBS; for others, see § Subchannels

Ownership
- Owner: VPM Media Corporation
- Sister stations: WCVW; WNVT; WNVC; WVPT; WVPY; WCVE-FM; WWLB; WBBT-FM

History
- First air date: WCVE-TV: September 10, 1964; WHTJ: May 19, 1989
- Former channel number: WCVE-TV: Analog: 23 (UHF, 1964–2009); Digital: 42 (UHF, until 2020); WHTJ: Analog: 41 (UHF, 1989–2009); Digital: 46 (UHF, until 2020)
- Former affiliations: WCVE-TV: NET (1964–1970)
- Call sign meaning: WCVE-TV: Central Virginia Educational; WHTJ: Home of Thomas Jefferson

Technical information
- Licensing authority: FCC
- Facility ID: WCVE-TV: 9987; WHTJ: 9990
- ERP: WCVE-TV: 310 kW; WHTJ: 300 kW
- HAAT: WCVE-TV: 327.3 m (1,074 ft); WHTJ: 335 m (1,099 ft)
- Transmitter coordinates: WCVE-TV: 37°30′45.6″N 77°36′4.8″W; WHTJ: 37°59′0″N 78°29′1″W

Links
- Public license information: WCVE-TV: Public file; LMS; WHTJ: Public file; LMS
- Website: www.vpm.org

WCVW
ATSC 3.0 station
- Richmond, Virginia
- Channels: Digital: 29 (UHF); Virtual: 57
- Branding: VPM Plus

Programming
- Affiliations: 57.1: PBS

History
- First air date: December 24, 1966
- Former channel numbers: Analog: 57 (UHF, 1966–2009); Digital: 44 (UHF, until 2020)
- Former affiliations: NET (1966–1970)
- Call sign meaning: Disambiguation of WCVE

Technical information
- Licensing authority: FCC
- Facility ID: 9989
- ERP: 112 kW
- HAAT: 327.3 m (1,074 ft)
- Transmitter coordinates: 37°30′45.6″N 77°36′4.8″W

Links
- Public license information: Public file; LMS

WCVE-TV (channel 23) is a PBS member television station in Richmond, Virginia, United States. Owned by the VPM Media Corporation (formerly known as the Commonwealth Public Broadcasting Corporation), the station maintains studios on East Broad Street in downtown Richmond and a transmitter at 23 Sesame Street in suburban Bon Air, adjacent to its former studios.

WHTJ (channel 41) in Charlottesville operates as a full-time satellite of WCVE-TV; this station's transmitter is located atop Carters Mountain. WCVE-TV also operates an ATSC 3.0 sister station in Richmond, WCVW (channel 57), whose transmitter is co-located with WCVE-TV.

The three stations were collectively branded as the Community Idea Stations from 2001 until 2019, when Commonwealth Public Broadcasting rebranded its stations as VPM (short for Virginia Public Media), with WCVE-TV and WHTJ becoming VPM PBS and WCVW becoming VPM Plus.

== History ==
The community-owned public broadcasting company was established in 1961 by Thomas Boushall (Chairman of the Richmond School Board and an officer of the Bank of Virginia) and a group of concerned citizens to employ television for educational purposes. The patron saints of public broadcasting in central Virginia were Boushall, E. Claiborne Robins Sr., Mary Ann Franklin, and Bill W. Spiller. Mrs. Franklin first approached Boushall and Henry I. Willett, then Superintendent of Richmond City Schools, with the idea of establishing an educational television station. Boushall and Franklin then recruited Spiller, who was hired in December 1963 and began working for them in January 1964.

WCVE-TV's sister station, WCVW-TV (channel 57) signed on in 1967. Richmond became the first community in Virginia to have dual stations, and only the eighth in the nation to do so, doubling the amount of instructional programming provided to schools in central Virginia. Over 40 years later, both WCVE-TV and WCVW are still in operation.

In 1974, Commonwealth Public Broadcasting took over WNVT, a Fairfax public TV station on the verge of financial insolvency, in order to protect instructional television and educational services for schools in Northern Virginia. In 1981, a second Northern Virginia station, WNVC, was established. These two stations provided international programming in English and several other languages tailored to the needs of the Washington, D.C., area's culturally diverse population.

In 1988, Union Theological Seminary & Presbyterian School of Christian Education announced plans to give up its public radio license for WRFK, which had assumed a fine music format from WFMV. To ensure public radio would remain in Richmond, WCVE-FM radio went on the air as a National Public Radio (NPR) member station. The following year, the company established WHTJ in Charlottesville. Before WHTJ's sign-on, Charlottesville had no full-power PBS station; only a repeater of Harrisonburg's WVPT served the area.

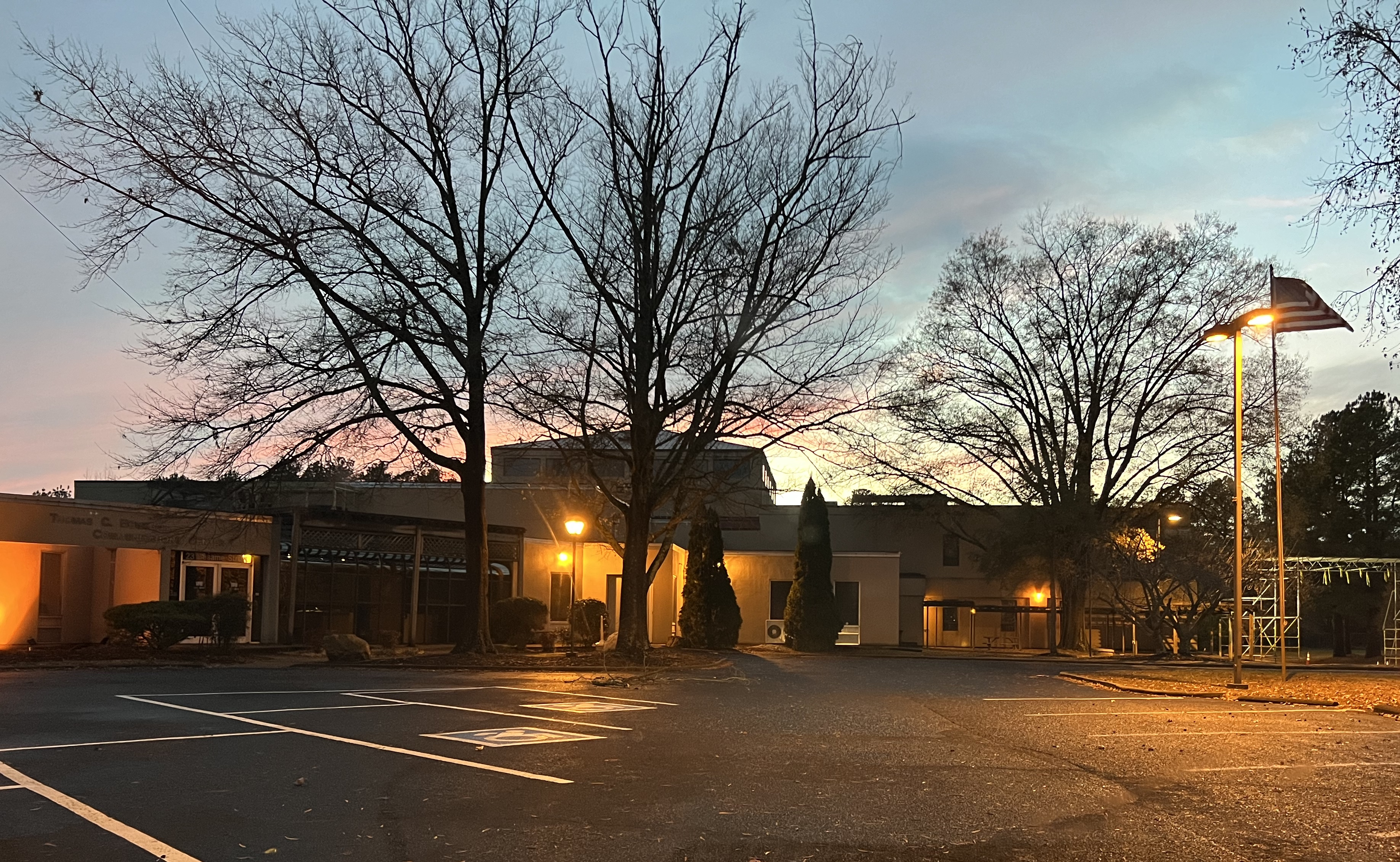
Former VPM studio complex in Bon Air.

A 25,000-square-foot (2,323 m^{2}) TV and radio studio-office complex was added in 1991.

After signing off at midnight almost daily for over 40 years, WCVE-TV and WCVW became 24-hour stations most days of the week in the fall of 2006. Starting in early 2008, the stylized "i" logo became the station's secondary logo, and the stations adopted a family of similar primary logos displaying their call letters.

The VPM stations moved into a new five-story facility on East Broad Street in downtown Richmond on August 6, 2026.

== Programming ==
Like most public television stations, this trio broadcasts shows distributed by PBS and American Public Television, but they also create a range of local programs. WCVE-TV produces Virginia Currents, a program profiling residents of the state, both typical and notable, which is aired by other PBS stations in Virginia such as Blue Ridge PBS and WVPT. WHTJ offers Charlottesville Inside-Out, hosted by musician Terri Allard. All of the programs are produced at WCVE-TV's studios in Richmond.

National shows presented by WCVE-TV include Legacy List with Matt Paxton.

== Technical information ==
=== Subchannels ===
Subchannels of WCVE-TV and WNVT
License	Subchannel	Res.	Short name	Programming
WCVE-TV	23.1	1080i	VPM	PBS
WCVE-TV	23.2	480i	Create	Create
WCVE-TV	23.4	480i	Kids	PBS Kids
WCVE-TV	23.5	720p	VPMPlus	PBS (WCVW)
WNVT	23.3	480i	World	World Channel

Broadcast on behalf of another station

Subchannel of WCVW-TV (ATSC 3.0)
Subchannel	Res.	Short name	Programming
57.1	1080p	WCVW-HD	PBS/VPM+
57.2	1080p	VPM	PBS
57.3	1080p	KIDS	PBS Kids
57.4	1080p	CREATE	Create
57.5	1080p	World	World Channel

Subchannels of WHTJ and WNVC
License	Subchannel	Res.	Short name	Programming
WHTJ	41.1	1080i	VPM	PBS
WHTJ	41.2	720p	VPMplus	Simulcast of WCVW
WHTJ	41.4	480i	Kids	PBS Kids
WHTJ	41.5	480i	Create	Create
WNVC	41.3	480i	World	World Channel

=== Analog-to-digital conversion ===
WCVE-TV, WCVW and WHTJ shut down their analog signals on March 30, 2009:

- WCVE-TV shut down its analog signal, over UHF channel 23; the station's digital signal remained on its pre-transition UHF channel 42, using virtual channel 23.
- WCVW shut down its analog signal, over UHF channel 57; the station's digital signal remained on its pre-transition UHF channel 44, using virtual channel 57.
- WHTJ shut down its analog signal, over UHF channel 41; the station's digital signal remained on its pre-transition UHF channel 46, using virtual channel 41.

On April 7, 2022, WCVE-TV began hosting WCVW's 57.1 main channel, as a result of WCVW converting to the ATSC 3.0 broadcast format. WCVE-TV uses its virtual channel number 23 instead of WCVW's virtual channel number 57.

== See also ==
- WCVE-FM

== Sources ==
- Fisher, Mark D. (2005) A Brief History of WFMV: Virginia's first stereophonic good music station, Richmond Radio Group on Yahoo; Richmond, VA
