= WVPT =

Television station in Harrisonburg, Virginia

WVPT and WVPY
Satellite of WCVE-TV and WCVW, Richmond, Virginia

WVPT: Staunton−Harrisonburg, Virginia; WVPY: New Market, Virginia; United States
- Channels for WVPT: Digital: 15 (UHF); Virtual: 51
- Channels for WVPY: Digital: 15.4 (UHF); Virtual: 51.2
- Branding: WVPT: VPM PBS; WVPY: VPM Plus

Programming
- Affiliations: 51.1/51.2: PBS; for others, see § Subchannels

Ownership
- Owner: VPM Media Corporation

History
- First air date: WVPT: September 9, 1968; WVPY: August 22, 1996 (in Front Royal, Virginia; license moved to New Market in 2018)
- Former channel number: WVPT: Analog: 51 (UHF, 1968–2009); Digital: 11 (VHF, 2001–2020), 12 (VHF, 2020–2023); WVPY: Analog: 42 (UHF, 1996–2009); Digital: 21 (UHF, 2002–2018), 11 (VHF, 2018–2020), 12 (VHF, 2020–2023); Virtual: 42 (2002–2018)
- Former affiliations: WVPT: NET (1968–1970)
- Call sign meaning: WVPT: Western Virginia Public Television

Technical information
- Licensing authority: FCC
- Facility ID: WVPT: 60111; WVPY: 66378
- ERP: DTS1: 195 kW; DTS2: 15 kW; DTS3: 0.1 kW
- HAAT: DTS1: 689 m (2,260 ft); DTS2: 333 m (1,093 ft); DTS3: 584 m (1,916 ft)
- Transmitter coordinates: DTS1: 38°9′54.4″N 79°18′50.1″W; DTS2: 37°59′0″N 78°29′1″W; DTS3: 38°36′3.9″N 78°37′56.8″W

Links
- Public license information: WVPT: Public file; LMS; WVPY: Public file; LMS
- Website: vpm.org

WVPT (channel 51) is a PBS member television station in Staunton, Virginia, United States, serving the Shenandoah Valley of Virginia and West Virginia. It is a full-time satellite of Richmond-licensed WCVE-TV (channel 23) which is owned by the VPM Media Corporation. WVPT's offices are located at Lakeview Hall near the campus of James Madison University on Port Republic Road in Harrisonburg, while its transmitters are located atop Elliott Knob west of Staunton, on Carters Mountain south of Charlottesville, and on Massanutten Mountain near New Market. Master control and most internal operations are based at WCVE-TV's studios at 23 Sesame Street in Bon Air, a suburb of Richmond.

WVPT operates a second station, WVPY, licensed to New Market. WVPY was formerly a full-time satellite of WVPT which served Winchester and the upper Shenandoah Valley. Through a channel-sharing agreement, it now broadcasts from WVPT's transmitter as a satellite of Richmond's WCVW, using virtual channel 51.2.

== History ==
WVPT signed on for the first time on September 9, 1968, under the ownership of the Shenandoah Valley Educational Television Corporation. It is the third-oldest educational station in Virginia, behind Hampton Roads' WHRO-TV and Richmond's WCVE-TV. WVPY, originally licensed to Front Royal, Virginia, was added in 1996, replacing low-powered translator W42AC, which had served the area since the 1980s.

WVPT also doubled as the default PBS station for Charlottesville (via translators W50CM in the city and W58DK in Ruckersville) until future sister station WCVE signed on WHTJ as a full-powered satellite in 1989.

On October 1, 2001, WVPT began broadcasting in digital with WVPY following in October 2002, with HD.

In November 2017, Shenandoah Valley Educational Television Corporation agreed to merge with Commonwealth Public Broadcasting Corporation (now VPM Media Corporation), owner of WCVE-TV, WCVW, WHTJ, WNVT, and WNVC. The merger took effect on June 11, 2018. On August 5, 2019, CPBC rebranded all of its stations under the "VPM" banner (for Virginia Public Media), with WVPT becoming "VPM PBS" and WVPY becoming "VPM Plus". Upon the rebranding, WVPT began simulcasting WCVE-TV.

== Technical information ==
=== Subchannels ===
Subchannels of WVPT and WVPY
License	Subchannel	Res.	Short name	Programming
WVPT	51.1	1080i	WVPT-HD	PBS
WVPT	51.3	480i	CREATE	Create
WVPT	51.4	480i	PBSKIDS	PBS Kids
WVPT	51.5	480i	WORLD	World Channel (WNVT)
WVPY	51.2	1080i	WVPY-HD	PBS

== Transmitters ==
During its days as a separately programmed PBS station, WVPT was the smallest PBS station licensed to Virginia. It primarily serves 22 counties and independent cities in Virginia and nine counties in West Virginia, one of the largest coverage areas in the PBS system. Much of this area is very mountainous. Largely because most of its service area is located in the United States National Radio Quiet Zone, its two main transmitters operated at only 525,000 watts and 141,000 watts in analog—in both cases, fairly modest for a full PBS member on the UHF band. Even in digital, they are not nearly strong enough to cover this vast and rugged area. Like all Shenandoah Valley stations, it depends mainly on cable, satellite and streaming for its viewership.

WVPT's distributed transmission system (DTS) allows the Charlottesville and New Market translators to rebroadcast on the same frequencies as the parent station. DTS call signs are based on those of the respective main stations, suffixed with a sequential number. For instance, the transmitter in Charlottesville is seen on UHF channel 15, virtual channel 51.1, and with the callsign WVPT1-DT.

WVPT additionally runs a digital replacement translator which covers Monterey on VHF channel 12. VPM also holds a construction permit to build an ATSC 3.0 station at Elliott Knob, also on VHF channel 12 and licensed to Waynesboro.

WVPY operated translators in Fulks Run, Luray and Ruckersville; these were discontinued when WVPY moved its transmitter to WVPT's tower.

=== Spectrum reallocation ===
As part of the Federal Communications Commission's (FCC) 2016–17 spectrum reallocation auction, WVPY's channel 21 allocations were sold for $19,851,752. The station and its distributed transmitters were to go off the air July 23, 2018, but the main transmitter is allowed to continue over-the-air operations by sharing the channel of another station. WVPY received two three-month extensions of the original January 23 deadline as it had difficulty finding a channel-sharing partner.

WVPY filed a channel-sharing agreement with sister station WVPT on April 11, 2018. WVPY's over-the-air signal moved to WVPT's main transmitter in Harrisonburg and its distributed transmitters, effective June 11. Few in the area actually lost over-the-air PBS service, as the area is also covered by WETA-TV in Washington, D.C., West Virginia Public Broadcasting's W08EE-D in Martinsburg, and Maryland Public Television's WWPB in Hagerstown. After the transfer, WVPY moved its license to New Market, as it would not cover Front Royal at all from WVPT's transmitter site. As it now covers exactly the same areas as WVPT over-the-air, WVPY relays the programming of WCVW on virtual channel 51.2.

== Cable and satellite availability ==
WVPT has long been available on cable in Lynchburg. Additionally, the station is carried on the Harrisonburg DirecTV and Dish Network feed. For decades, it was available on Comcast cable and its predecessors in Charlottesville and central Virginia. However, it was never carried on satellite in Charlottesville, as FCC rules do not allow a station to be uplinked unless it has a full-power transmitter located within the market. With WVPT adopting the same schedule as WCVE/WHTJ, WVPT disappeared from cable systems in Charlottesville in the summer of 2019.

WVPY was previously available over-the-air in large portions of the Virginia and West Virginia portions of the Washington, D.C. metropolitan area; Front Royal and Winchester are part of the Washington market. It was also available on the Washington DirecTV and Dish Network feeds until 2016, when the two satellite providers dropped it, claiming they could no longer receive an off-air signal from WVPY.
